= 2021 Cumbre Vieja volcanic eruption =

Volcanic eruption in the Canary Islands, Spain

2021 Tajogaite eruption
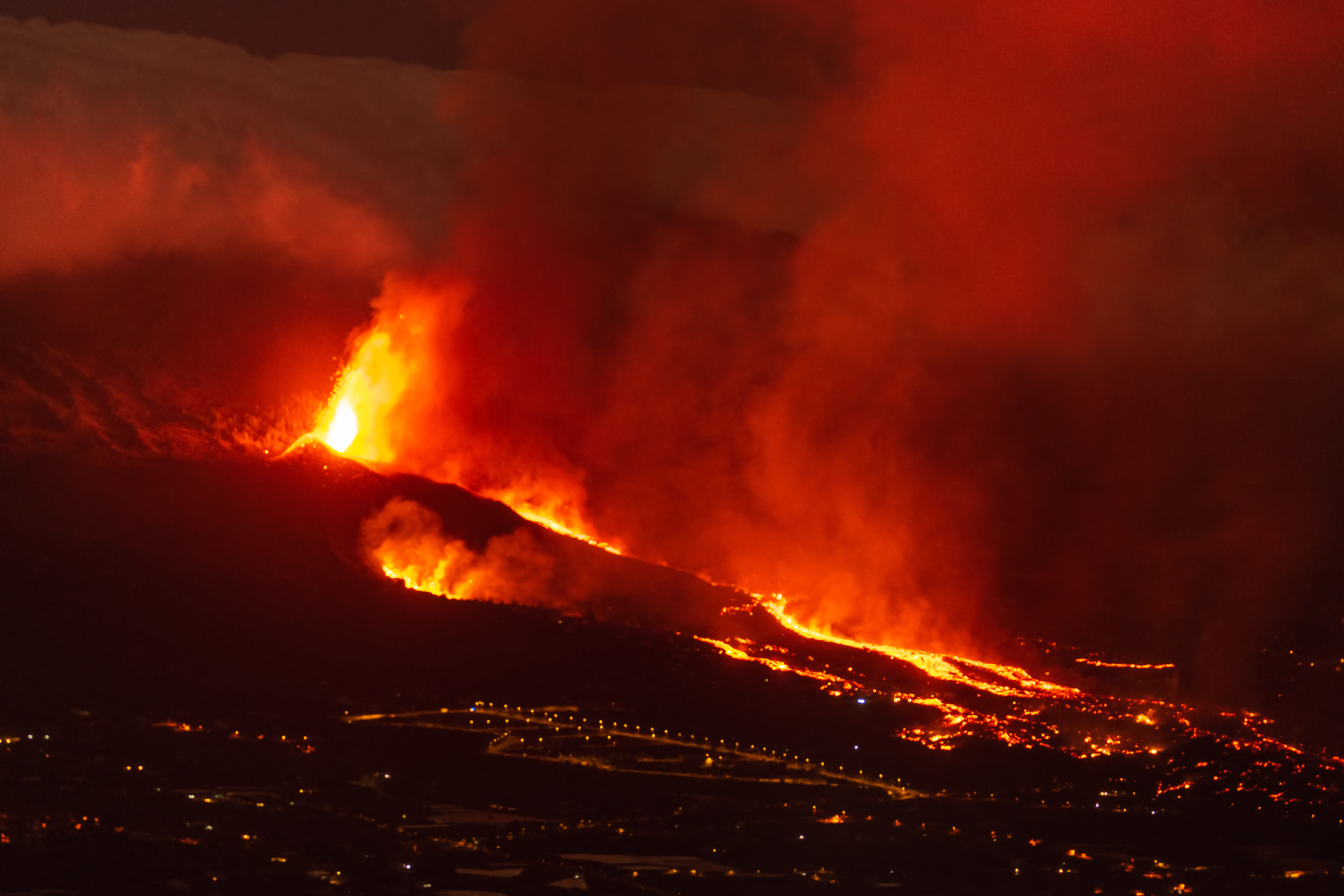
- The eruption seen at night on 20 September 2021
- Volcano: Tajogaite
- Start date: 19 September 2021
- Start time: 15:12 WEST (14:12 UTC)
- End date: 13 December 2021
- Type: Fissure eruption Strombolian eruption
- Location: La Palma, Spain; 28°36′54″N 17°52′07″W
- VEI: 3
- Impact: 843 million euros (total material damage, as of December 2021)
- Deaths: 1

Maps
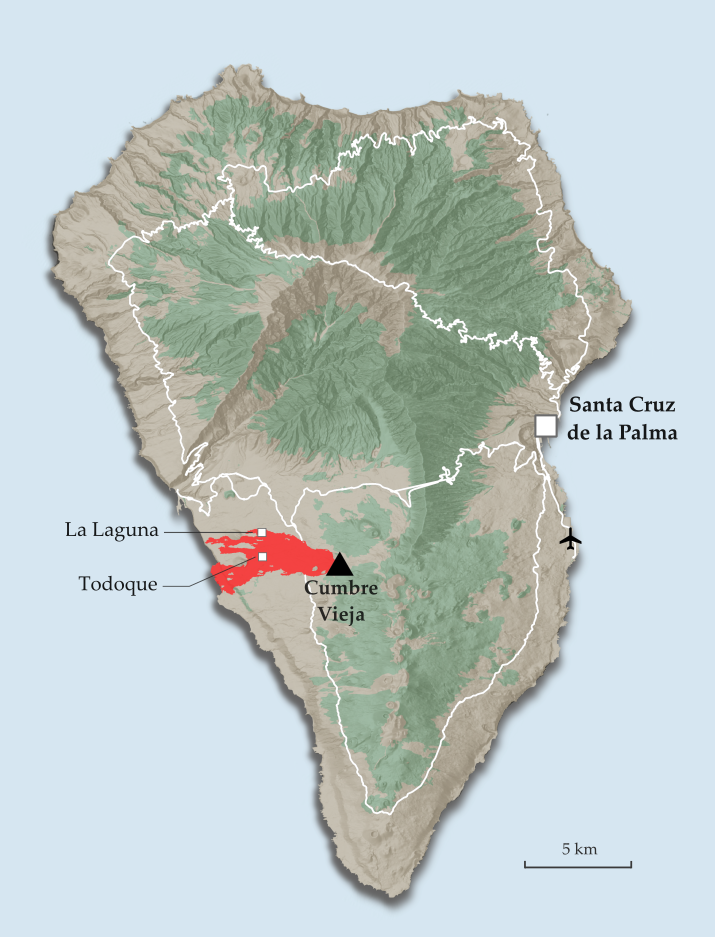
- Lava flows (red) as of 23 November 2021

An eruption at the Cumbre Vieja volcanic ridge, comprising the southern half of the Spanish island of La Palma in the Canary Islands, took place between 19 September and 13 December 2021. It was the first volcanic eruption on the island since the eruption of Teneguía in 1971. At 85 days, it is the longest known and the most damaging volcanic eruption on La Palma since records began. The total damage caused by the volcano amounts up to 843 million euros.

The lava flow covered over 1,000 hectares (2,500 acres), prompting the evacuation of around 7,000 people. The lava flow was about 3.5 kilometres (2.2 miles) wide at its widest point, about 6.2 kilometres (3.9 miles) long and reached the sea, destroying more than 3,000 buildings, cutting the coastal highway and forming a new peninsula, as well as an extensive system of lava tubes. The town of Todoque, including its easternmost neighbourhood Los Campitos, was completely destroyed by lava, which also reached La Laguna (a town within the municipality of Los Llanos de Aridane). One death was caused by inhalation of toxic gases from the volcano.

== Previous eruptions ==
The Cabeza de Vaca area is northwest of the two 1949 eruptive centers, San Juan and Duraznero. During the 1949 eruption, fault displacements also had westward components with movement down the volcano's flanks.

The last subaerial eruption in Spain, also on La Palma, was the 1971 Teneguía eruption, which asphyxiated a nearby photographer with its fumes. The eruption also caused some property damage to roads, crops, and homes. The last eruption of any kind in the Canaries was the 2011–2012 eruption of El Hierro, a submarine volcano.

== Earthquake swarm before eruption ==
An animation of the earthquake swarm from the start until 19 September

An earthquake swarm started under Cumbre Vieja on 11 September 2021. It slowly migrated to the surface, with earthquakes of up to around mb_{Lg} magnitude 3.5, and more than 22,000 earthquakes were recorded in the space of a week. A yellow warning of potential volcanic activity was issued on 13 September, covering 35,000 people in the municipalities of Los Llanos de Aridane, Fuencaliente, El Paso and Villa de Mazo. At least 40 individuals and some livestock on La Palma were evacuated by authorities due to this warning, although no complete evacuation of the vicinity around the volcano had been declared.

== Eruption ==
The eruption began at 14:13 local time (14:13 UTC) on 19 September 2021 in a forested area called "Cabeza de Vaca", of Montaña Rajada, in the Las Manchas section of the municipality of El Paso.

Around 300 people from the local area were evacuated shortly after the eruption, and then a further 700 people (including 500 tourists) were evacuated from the Los Llanos de Aridane coastal region in case the lava flowed to the sea and cut off the main access roads. The total number of evacuees is now estimated to be 5,000 to 10,000. The alert level was raised to its highest level—red—due to the eruption.

The eruption took place from at least five main vents.

On the fourth day, according to the Volcanological Institute of the Canary Islands, the volcano entered a more explosive phase, expelling less volcanic gas.

For its first two months, the eruption was assigned a rating on the Volcanic Explosivity Index (VEI) of VEI 2 (on a scale of 8). On 20 November 2021, the scientific committee of the Canary Islands Volcanic Emergency Plan (Pevolca) raised the rating from VEI 2 to VEI 3. Though in modern eruptions where it can be measured, eruption column height is often seen as a more accurate measure, in this case the change was based on the 10 million cubic metres (350 million cubic feet) of ejected material measure alone. The VEI rating was increased despite no change in the eruptive mechanism or explosiveness.

== Lava flows and earthquakes ==
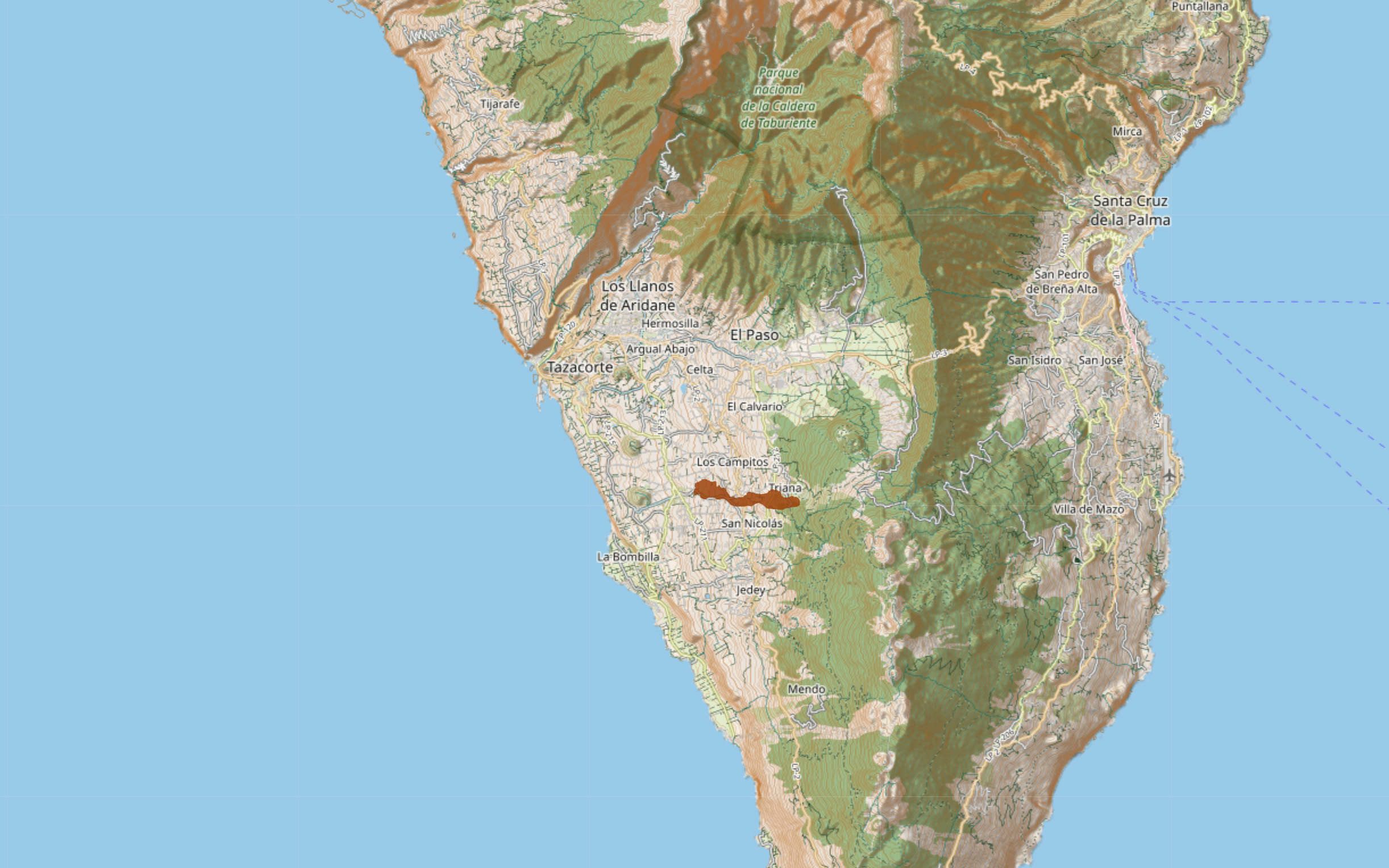
Area covered by the lava flow on Monday afternoon 20 September, by Copernicus EMS — Mapping

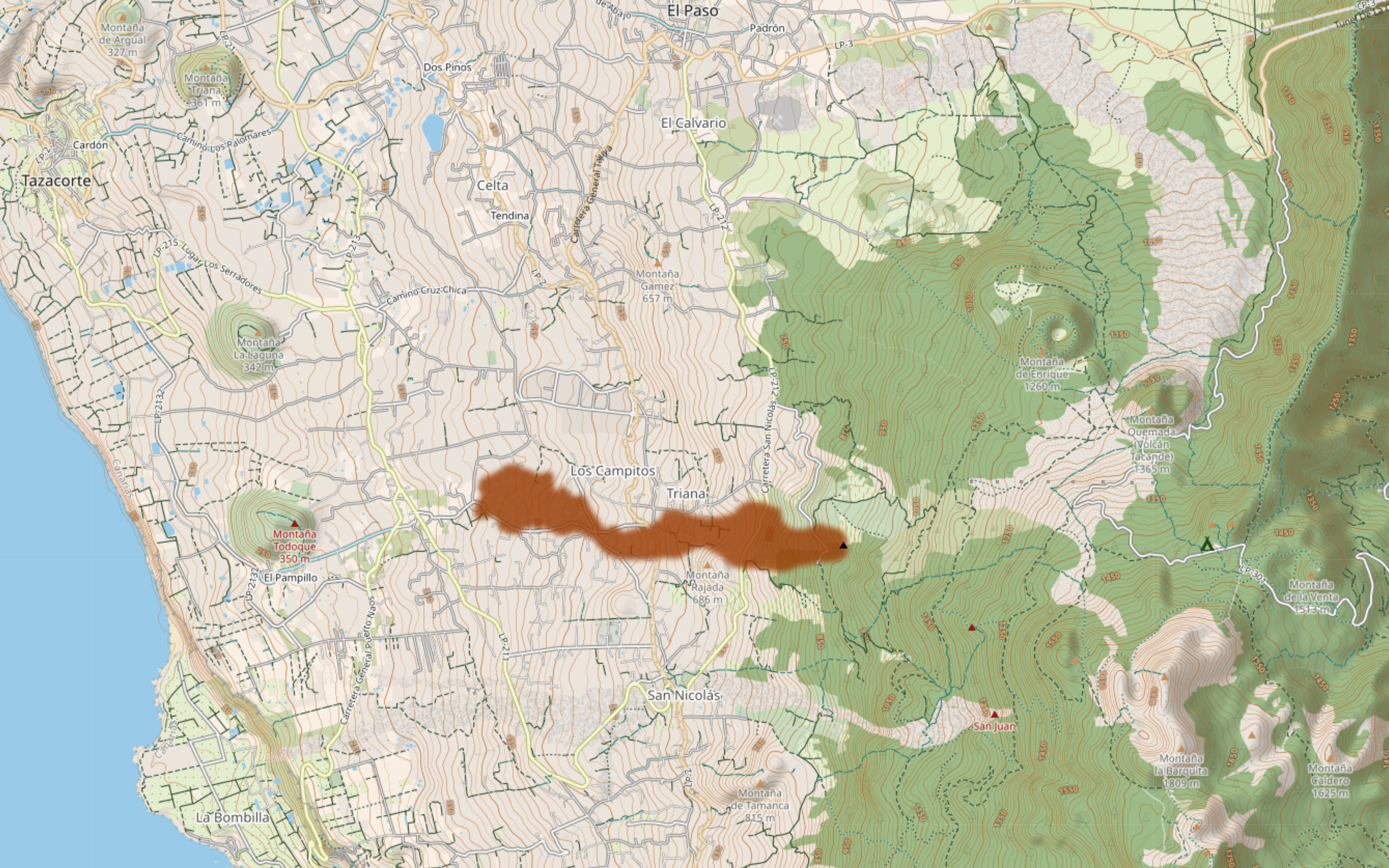
Close-up view of the area covered by the lava flow as of 20 September 2021

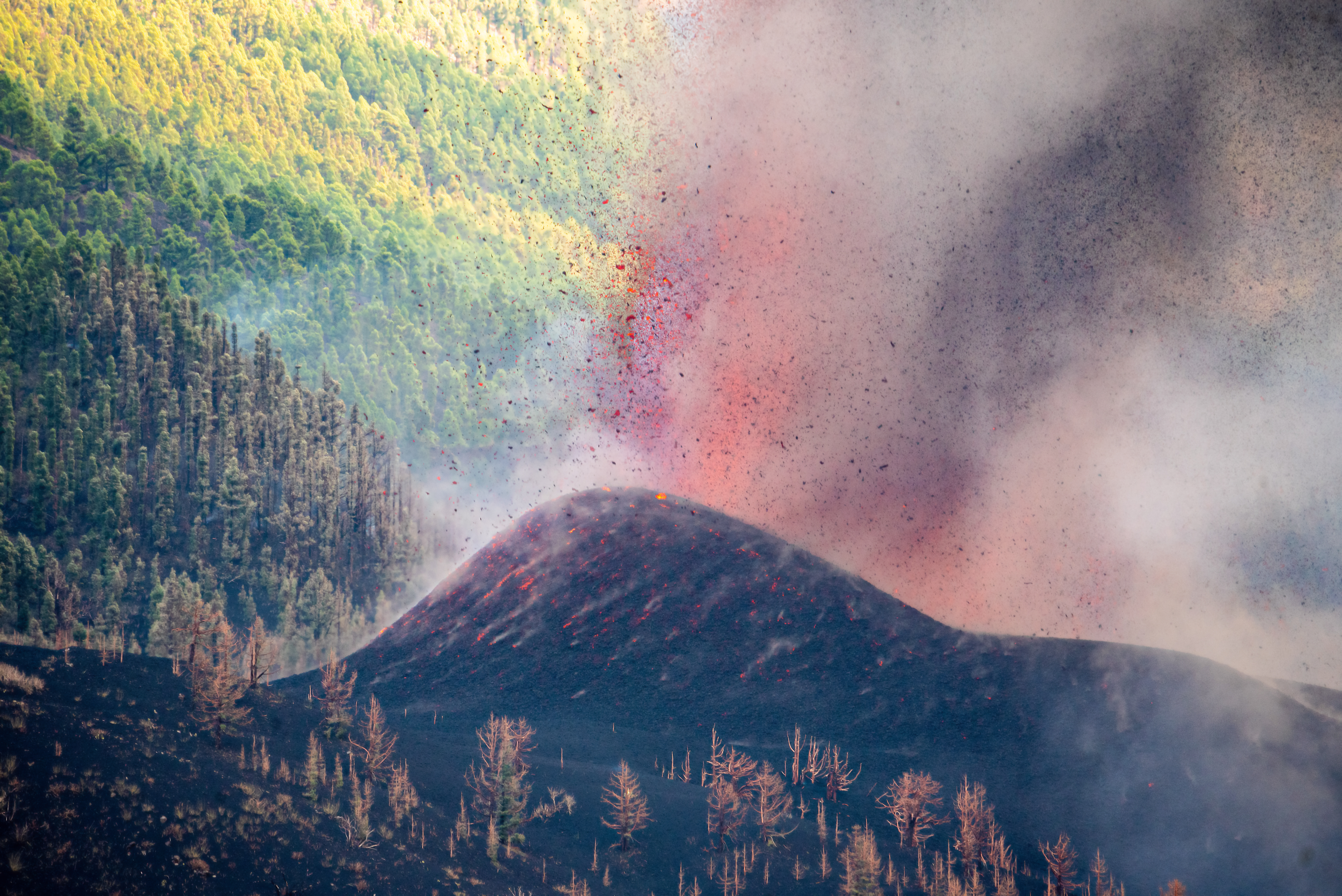
The eruption on 20 September

=== September ===
On the afternoon of 19 September, the Emergency Committee of the General Hospital of La Palma suspended all non-urgent surgeries, outpatient consultations and patient visits, with exceptions in the latter case, as a preventive measure to guarantee the hospital's capacity to attend in the event that it was required due to the eruption. The hospital resumed normal operations the following day.

On the morning of 20 September, the Canarian Ministry of Education ordered the suspension of all classes in the schools of the nearby municipalities of El Paso, Los Llanos de Aridane and Tazacorte. That same morning, direct flights to the island of La Gomera were suspended, but were restored a few hours later. The day before, the public company in charge of civil air navigation and civil airports in Spain, ENAIRE, together with Eurocontrol, activated the action procedure for volcanic ash, but assured the public that air traffic over the Canary Islands was not affected.

On 20 September, around two hundred houses have been destroyed by the flow, according to local authorities. No casualties were reported and flights continued into the islands.

In the early afternoon of 21 September, the lava reached the neighbourhood of Todoque, in the municipality of Los Llanos de Aridane, with 1,200 inhabitants. At the end of that day, 185 buildings were destroyed, 400 hectares (990 acres) of arable land were burnt and 5,500 people were evacuated. Los Campitos public school in Los Llanos de Aridane is among those affected, which was destroyed on Monday 20 September.

On 24 September, the eruptive activity intensified, with further ash and volcanic material falling greater distances, forcing firefighters to withdraw from the neighbourhood of Todoque. Two new vents had opened in the side of the main cone, outpouring lava. Authorities extended the exclusion zone and ordered the evacuation of the neighbourhoods of Tajuya, Tacande de Abajo and Tacande de Arriba in the afternoon. Several civilian airlines suspended flights to the island due to the ash cloud.

On 25 September, Aena, the operator of the La Palma Airport, suspended all flights due to ash accumulation with cleaning tasks underway. On the same day, a part of the volcano's principal cone collapsed and a new emissive vent opened to the west of the principal cone (or possibly a previous one that had reopened). The new lava flow followed the previous path, although slightly widening in area.

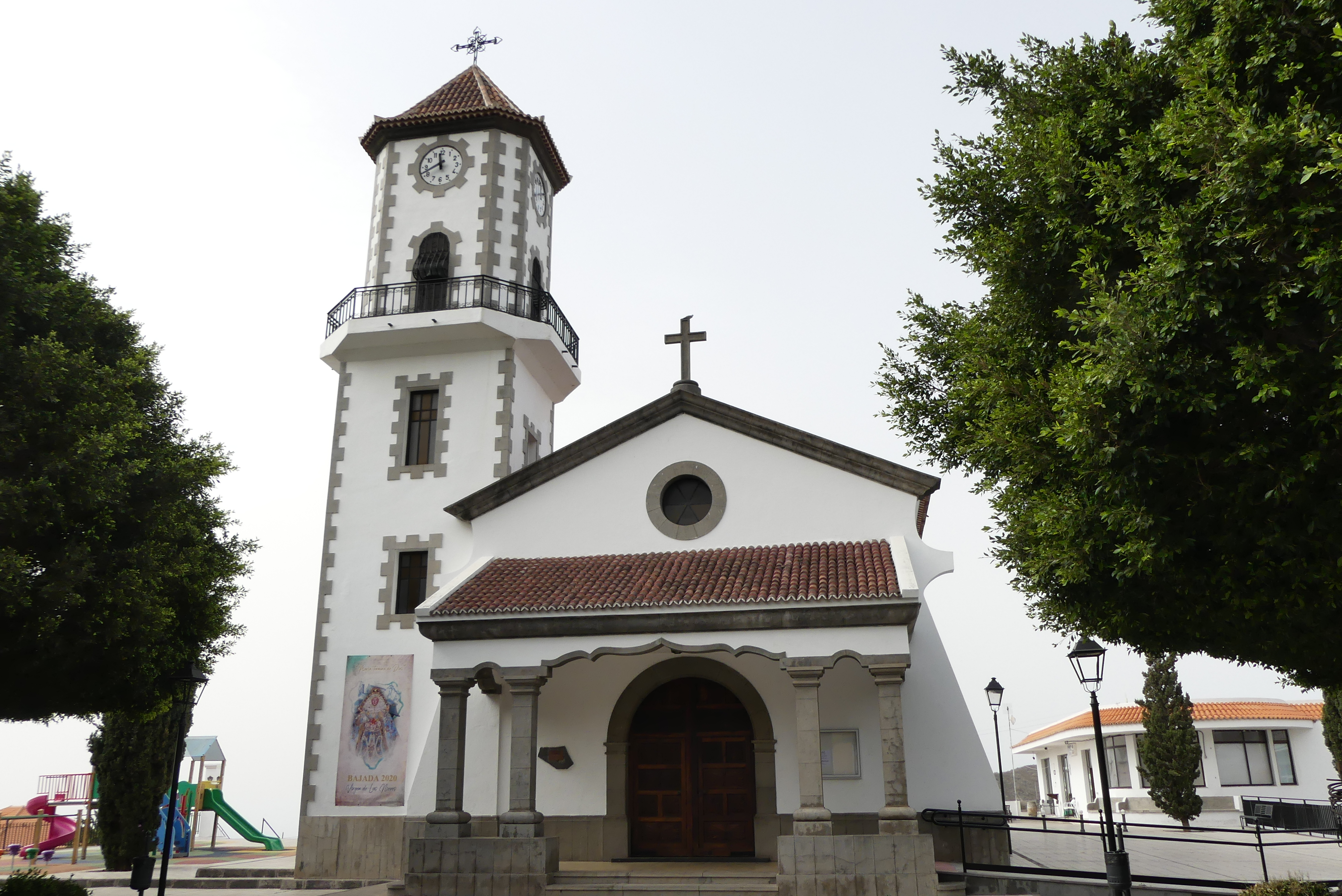
The church of Saint Pius X in Todoque was destroyed by the reinvigorated lava flow on 26 September

On 26 September, the previously stalled lava flows started again to advance towards the coast, destroying the Todoque neighbourhood church of Saint Pius X and advancing to the sea at a speed of 100 to 200 metres (330 to 660 ft) per hour, mostly on top of the older flow. Meanwhile, the volcano seemed to have entered a more stabilised period after the previous days of more explosive eruptions with a slight fall in seismic activity that took place at deeper depths than before, according to IGN.

On 28 September, at around 23:02 local time (22:02 UTC), the lava flow reached the sea at the Beach of Los Guirres, also called New Beach, of the municipality of Tazacorte. The heating of the seawater to a high temperature might produce laze containing emissions of sulfuric, hydrochloric, and hydrofluoric acid into the air. Traces of sulphur dioxide emissions from the volcano had been detected in the upper stratosphere as far north as Scandinavia, but the actual impacts of the SO_{2} emissions on the weather and air quality were said to be globally negligible so far, mostly due to the emitted amounts and their altitude. Earlier on that day, Spain's government classified the island of La Palma as a disaster zone, due to the steadily increasing property and economic damage caused by the eruption, a move that will trigger emergency subsidies and other support measures.

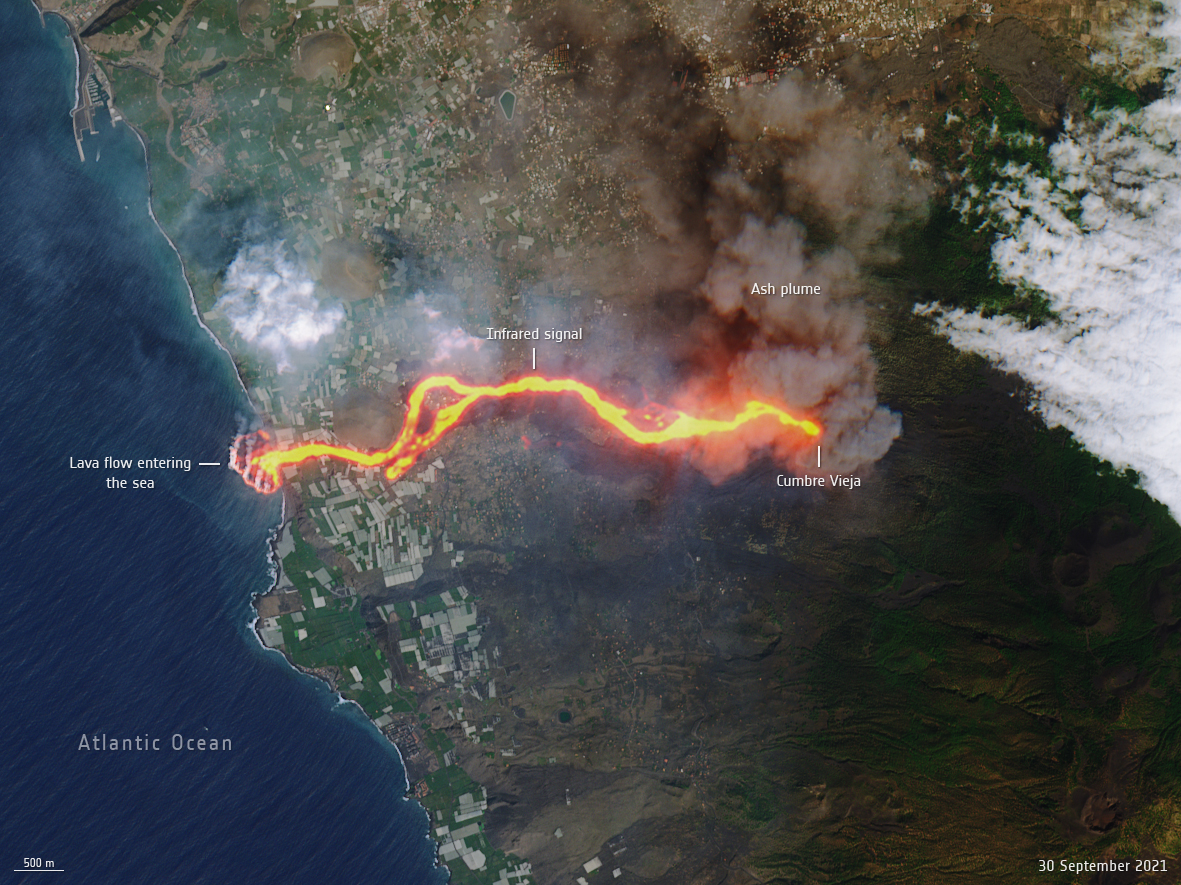
The course of the molten lava flow between its source (right) and the sea (left), seen by Copernicus on 1 October

The lava flow into the sea created a new lava delta, or fajana. As of 30 September 2021, this was 20 hectares (49 acres) in size and continuing to grow. It was 27.7 hectares (68 acres) by 2 October. The new land is claimed by the Spanish Government.

=== October ===
On 1 October, a new vent opened, the third in addition to the main crater. This emitted two streams of lava that cut the important LP2 highway and threatened more of the populated area of Los Llanos de Aridane. The total amount of lava emitted since the eruption began was by now estimated to be at least 80 million cubic metres (2.8 billion cubic feet).

On 4 October, the main cone of the volcano collapsed, increasing the lava flow.

On 7 October, at 12:17 local time, an earthquake of magnitude 4.3 mbLg was detected on the island at a depth of 35 km (22 mi). This was the strongest earthquake since the start of the eruption. By the end of the day, the lava had covered 422 hectares (1,040 acres) of land and the lava delta had grown to cover an area of 38 hectares (94 acres).

By 8 October, according to the Copernicus Emergency Management Service, the lava flow had affected 497 hectares (1,230 acres) of land and more than 1100 buildings had been destroyed.

On 9 October, part of the north face of the volcano collapsed, causing the lava within the crater to spill out. Three new lava streams were formed.

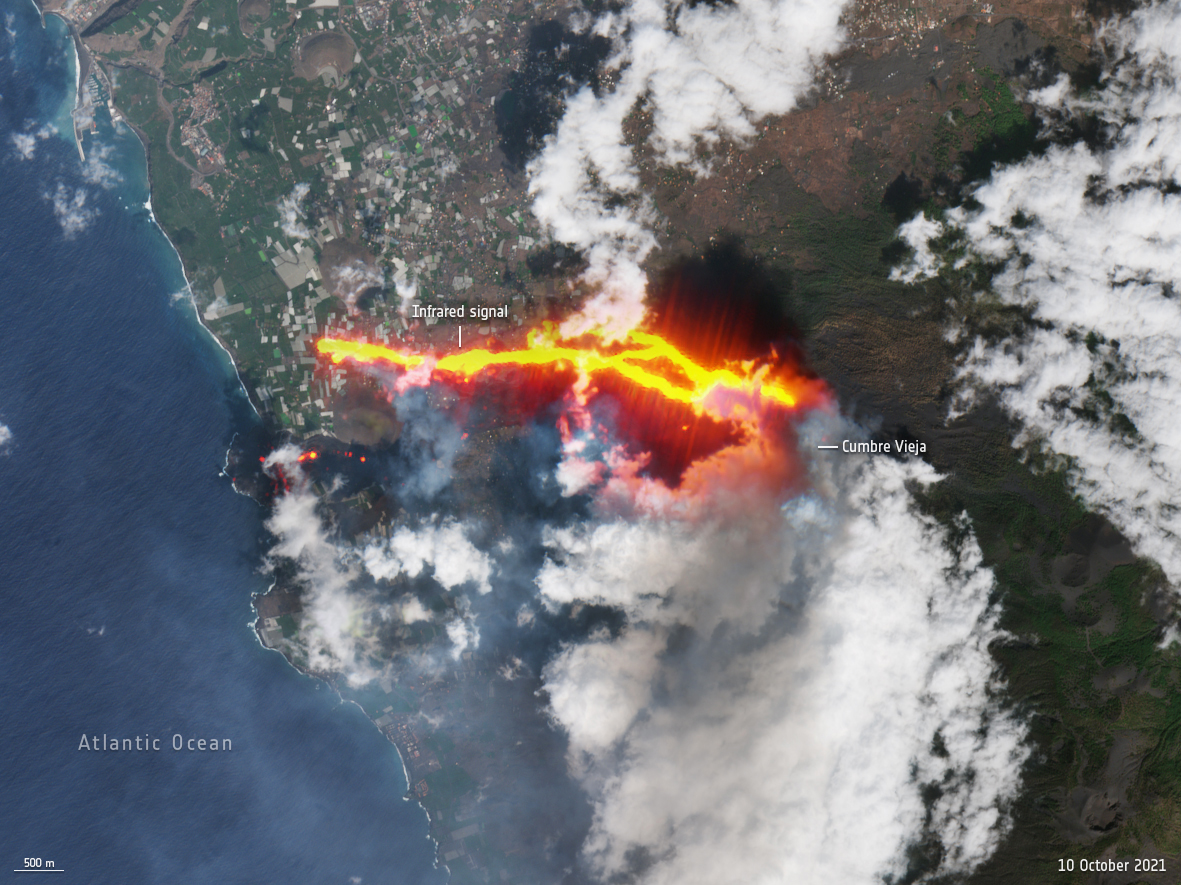
Molten lava flow seen by Copernicus on 10 October

On 10 October, large chunks of red-hot lava the size of three-storey buildings rolled down and one of the new lava streams reached Callejón de la Gata, an industrial area of Los Llanos de Aridane, and destroyed what was left of the town of Todoque.

On 11 October, the northern side of the volcanic crater collapsed creating a new lava flow which threatened another urban district known as La Laguna.

By 12 October, the lava flow had covered over 595 hectares (1,470 acres). A fire at a cement factory and the risk of lava affecting more factories and warehouses in an industrial area led to the confinement of 3,500 people in El Paso and Los Llanos de Aridane, with the northern lava flow around 300 metres (980 ft) from the sea. A magnitude 4.1 earthquake also occurred at a depth of 11 kilometres (6.8 mi).

On 13 October, the strongest earthquake since the start of the earthquake storm was felt across the island, with magnitude 4.4 at a depth of 36 km (22 mi).

The northern lava flow entered La Laguna on 14 October, destroying a football pitch and a supermarket, as well as other buildings. By 15 October, further evacuations of regions that might be affected by the lava flow meant that nearly 7,000 people had been displaced, and the lava flow covered over 670 hectares (1,700 acres).

A magnitude 4.6 earthquake occurred at 4:41am on 16 October, along with a 4.5 earthquake at 6:07am, both at a depth of 37 km (23 mi) below Mazo.

On 17 October, the advance of the lava flows had slowed. There were plans to rescue five dogs who are trapped in a water tank between lava flows, although it was confirmed that one of them had died. The rescue would involve a specialist company, and the use of drones that usually transport cargo to ships in Gibraltar. By the evening, though, the lava flows reactivated, and it was expected that a second one of them will reach the sea shortly. Another earthquake of magnitude 4.6 occurred below Mazo. Meanwhile, 4,500 children went back to school again for the first time in 30 days, despite the volcanic eruption and COVID-19, with students from Los Campitos and Todoque relocated to a building in Los Llanos. The lava flows have also impacted industrial structures such as cement plants, which have also caused gas clouds and explosions, and have affected flights at Tenerife North–Ciudad de La Laguna Airport.

By 19 October, one month after the start of the eruption, the lava had covered 762 hectares (1,880 acres) of land, almost 30% of which were banana plantations, 1086 land plots, 1692 buildings and 56.4 kilometres (35.0 mi) of roads. On 24 October, a magnitude 4.9 earthquake occurred beneath Mazo at 4:34pm. The total extent of the lava flows had by now covered an area of at least seven square kilometres (2.7 sq mi).

On 25 October, the intensity of the earth tremors had increased and the lava flows to date had destroyed over 2,000 buildings.

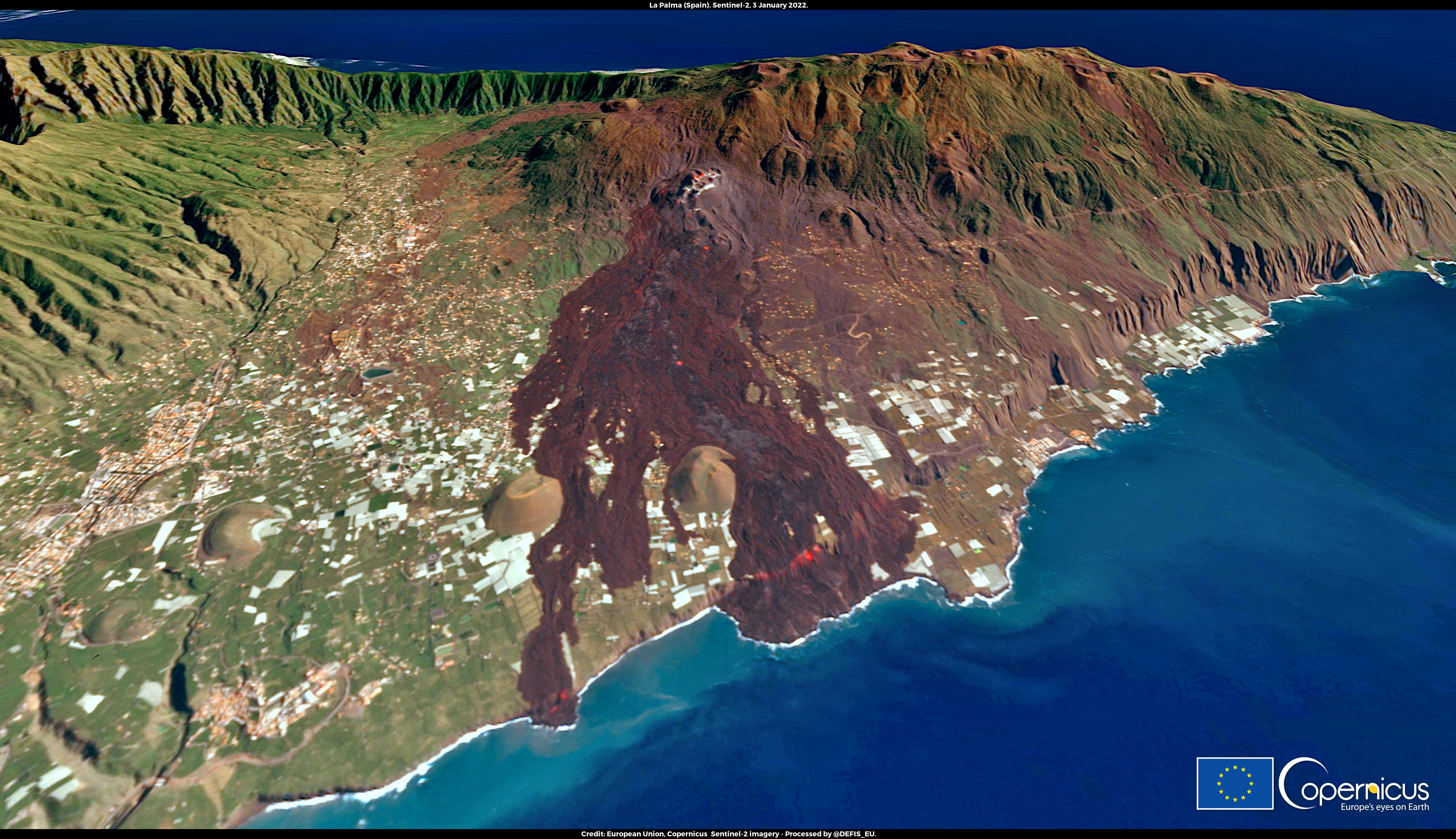
Three-dimensional visualisation (from Copernicus Sentinel-2 satellite imagery) of the Tajogaite vent and its lava flows as of January 2022

On 26 October, a magnitude 4.8 earthquake under Mazo was also felt in Tenerife, La Gomera and El Hierro. The upper main part of the volcano also had a partial collapse, with the resulting lava flow following the previous flows into the sea.

As of 26 October 2021, the lava that has flowed from the volcano (on 26 October estimated to be 215 million cubic metres or 7.6 billion cubic feet) has destroyed or affected over 2,100 buildings, over 66 kilometres (41 mi) of roads and covered an area of over 900 hectares (2,200 acres), with volcanic ash fall covering over 5,500 hectares (14,000 acres) within the limits of the monitored area, according to estimates from visual and radar satellite data by the Copernicus EMS.

On 27 October, the volcano emitted at least 50,000 tonnes (55,000 short tons) of sulphur dioxide gas. This caused the authorities to advise the public to close the windows of their homes and remain indoors.

On 28 October, at least 8 earthquakes over a magnitude 4 were felt in La Palma.

On 29 October, the lava flows had covered a total of around 900 hectares (2,200 acres) and a total number of 7000 people had been evacuated from the surrounding area.

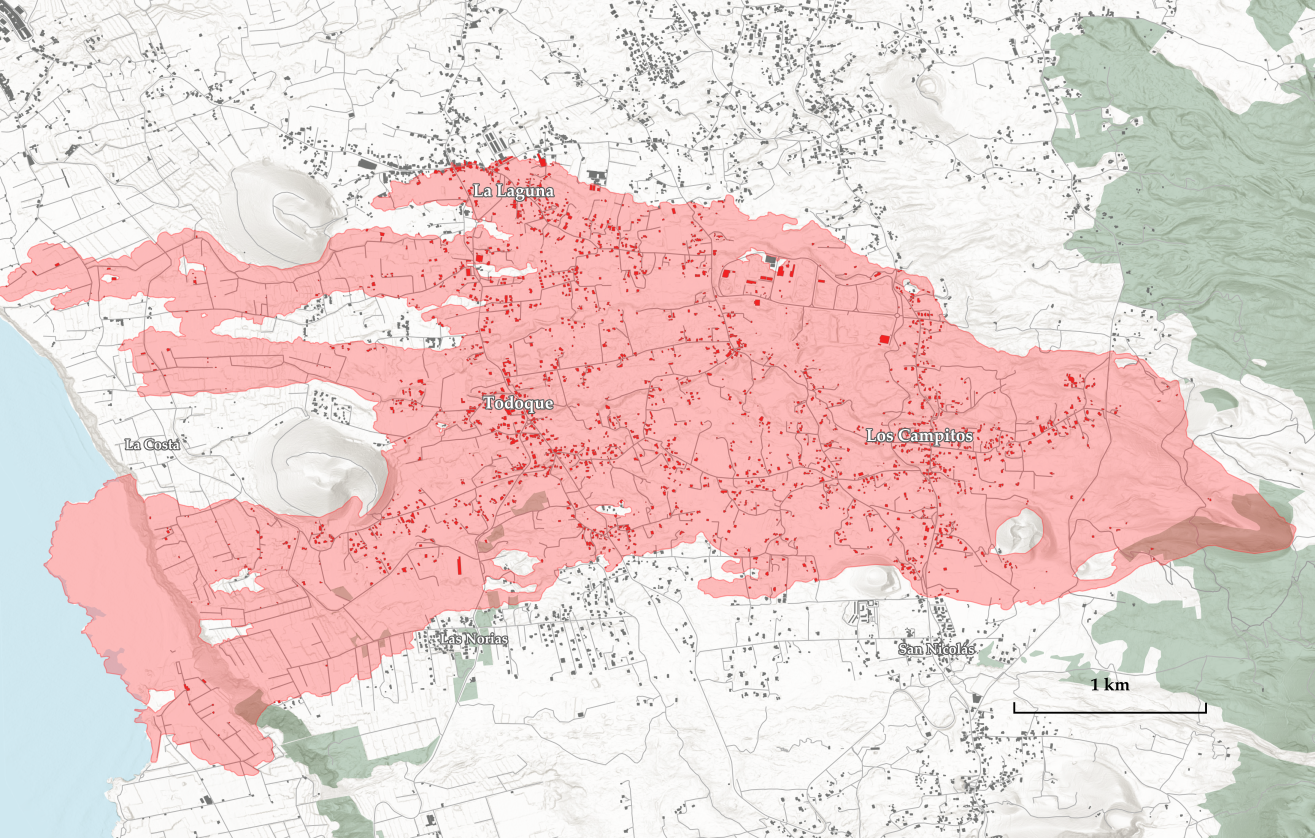
Extent of lava coverage by 23 November (Copernicus EMS), with highlight of destroyed buildings in Todoque, La Laguna and Los Campitos

On 30 October, a magnitude 5 earthquake occurred, again under Mazo. The area covered by lava flows had increased to around 963 hectares.

On 31 October, a second magnitude 5 earthquake occurred and it was reported that more would be expected. The area covered by lava flows had increased to at least 1,000 hectares (2,500 acres). It was also reported that all hotels, hostels, guest-houses, etc. at La Palma were fully booked on account of the large number of tourists travelling there wanting to see the volcano.

=== November ===
On 10 November, a second lava flow reached the sea.

On 14 November, a 72-year-old man died from injuries sustained when the roof of his house collapsed while he was clearing ash off it. His death was the first associated with the eruption.

On 15 November, a third lava flow reached the sea increasing the island area by a further 40 hectares (99 acres). Volcanic activity had lessened although the local air quality was still serious.

On 20 November, the Volcanic Explosivity Index (VEI) was upgraded from VEI 2 to VEI 3, when the ejected pyroclastic material reached 10 million m^{3} (350 million cu ft). It was expressly emphasized that the upgrade does not mean an increased risk, since the activity of the volcanic eruption had not increased.

On 25 November, a new fissure opened to the south of the original cone, spewing lava which was less viscous and flowed faster.

On 28 November, at 03:00 local time (02:00 UTC), a new fissure opened at the foot of the northeastern flank of the main cone, spewing lava and pyroclastic ash.

=== December ===
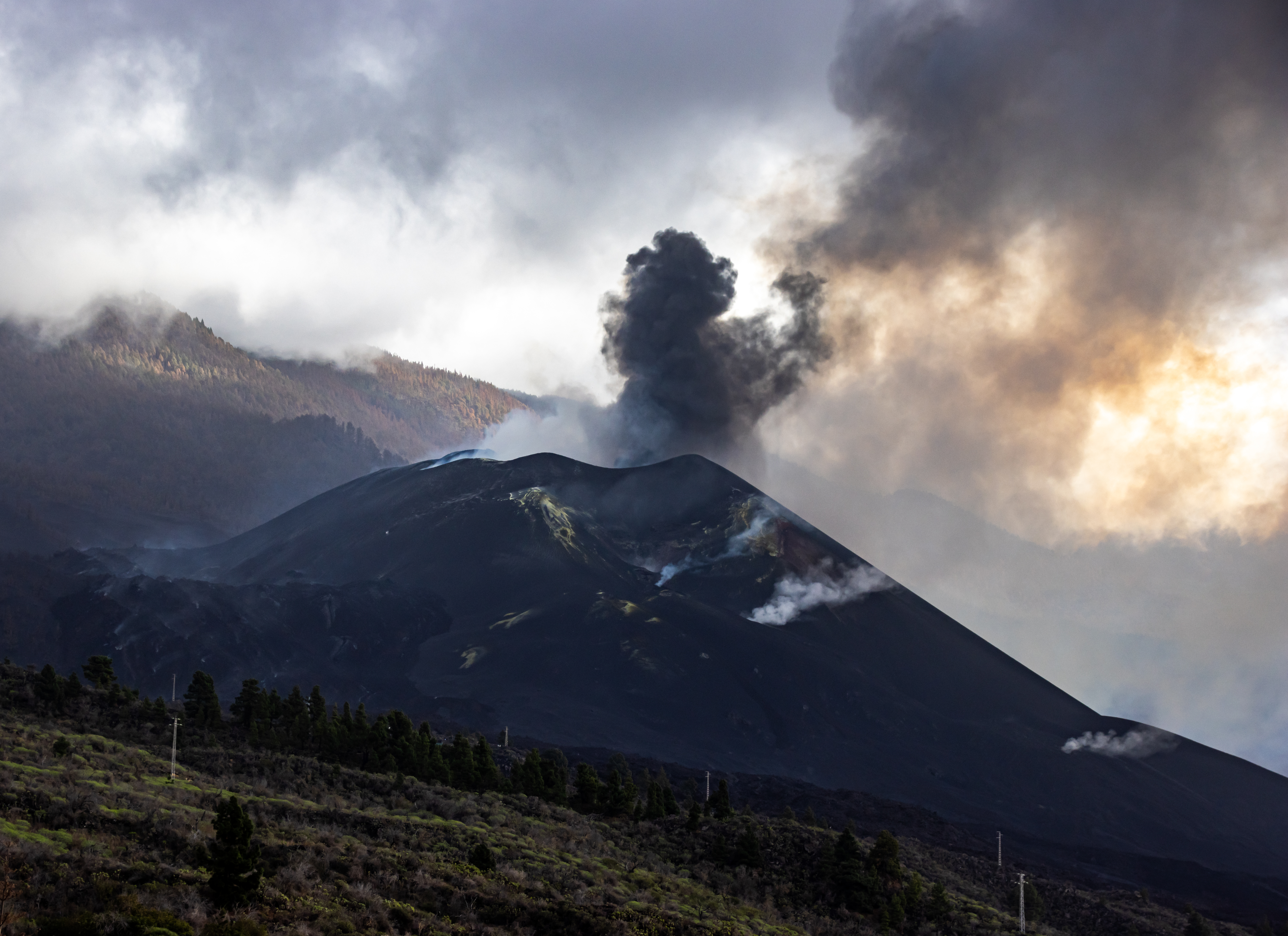
The eruption on 4 December

On 12 December, the volcanic eruption broke the local record, when it reached 85 days of continuous activity. The eruption is considered to be the longest known eruption of a volcano on La Palma. Previously, the eruption of the Tajuya Volcano in 1585 was the longest at 84 days. No reliable data is available about previous volcanic eruptions.

On 13 December, the volcano released large amounts of toxic sulphur dioxide gas. As a result, the authorities ordered 30,000 residents of three municipalities to remain indoors. On the same day, the volcanic eruption ceased.

On 25 December, the eruption was declared to have ended after three months.

The office of Special Commissioner for the Reconstruction of the island of La Palma was created in 2022 to coordinate and promote the actions adopted by the General State Administration to repair the damage caused by volcanic eruptions and for the reconstruction of the island of La Palma. Hector Izquierdo Triana, born in La Palma and secretary of state for finance at that time, was appointed to the office. On 31 July 2024 he was awarded the Grand Cross of the Royal Order of Civil Merit.

== Map of the affected areas ==
Interactive map of the lava extent, mapped and updated by collaborators of OpenStreetMap

== Political reactions ==
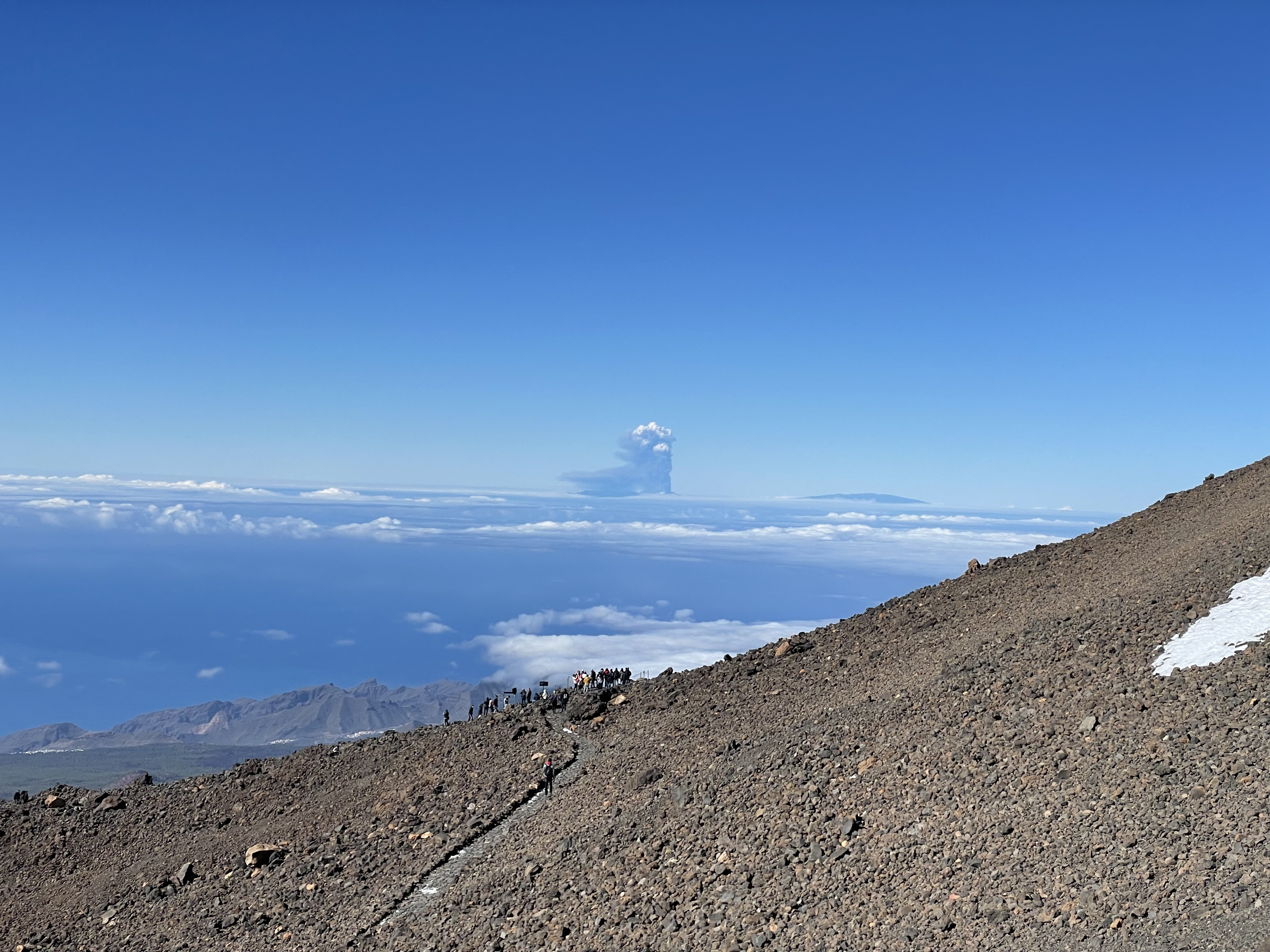
La Palma Eruption Dec. 12 2021 From Monumento Natural del Teide

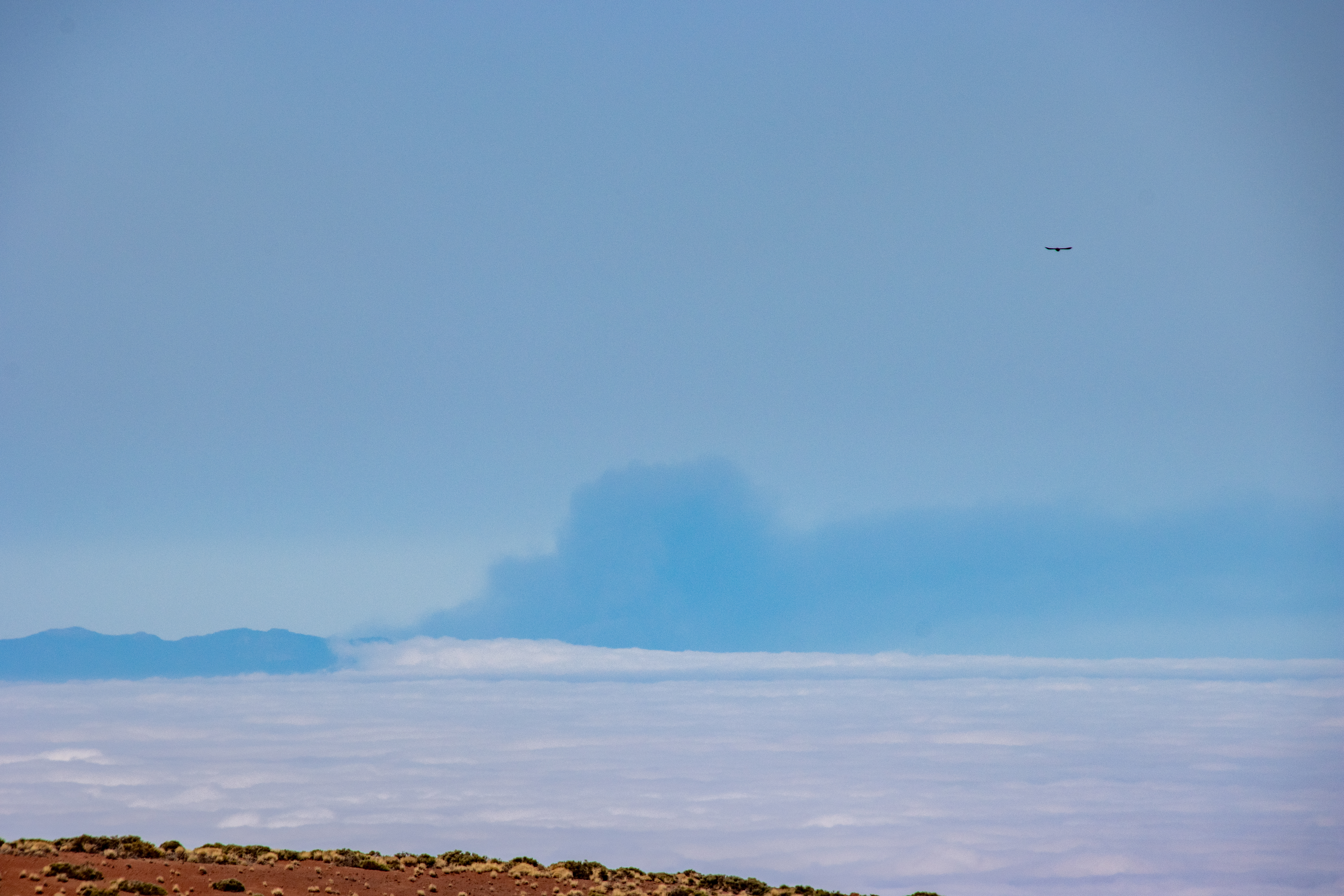
The ash plume seen from Tenerife on 30 September 2021; the Cumbre Vieja ridge can be seen on the left.

Prime Minister of Spain Pedro Sánchez went to the archipelago shortly after the eruption to see the situation on La Palma first-hand, the coordination of the system and the protocols activated, postponing a trip to New York to attend the Seventy-sixth session of the United Nations General Assembly.

King Felipe VI called the President of the Canary Islands, Ángel Víctor Torres, on the afternoon of the eruption to inquire about the situation. The following day during the opening ceremony of the university year in Córdoba, the King sent a message of support to "those who are suffering the evacuation of their homes" and thanked the emergency services for their work. A few days later, he, accompanied by Queen Letizia, travelled to the island.

On 19 September, the European Union, on request of Spanish General Directorate for Civil Protection and Emergencies (CENEM), activated the Copernicus Emergency Management Service – Mapping to monitor the eruption and the President of the European Commission Ursula von der Leyen announced via Twitter that "additional support, if necessary," would be made available to the Spanish government.

On 20 September, the Minister of Industry, Trade and Tourism, Reyes Maroto, declared that the eruption on La Palma could be used as a tourist attraction to lure visitors. Her comments caused widespread criticism, because homes, public buildings and businesses began to be destroyed by the lava flows. Later, due to mounting criticism, including from opposition politicians, Reyes Maroto retracted her words.

The Bishop of Tenerife, Bernardo Álvarez Afonso, offered Mass on 22 September at the Sanctuary of Nuestra Señora de las Nieves in La Palma, together with the priests of the island, to pray for the end of the eruption. At the Angelus on Sunday 26 September, Pope Francis expressed his "closeness and solidarity with those affected by the eruption of the volcano on the island of La Palma, in the Canary Islands". The Todoque Church was subsequently destroyed by the lava flow on 26 September.

On 24 September, Prime Minister, Pedro Sánchez announced that at the next meeting of the council of ministers, on 28 September, the island will be declared a disaster area, that the government is preparing a reconstruction plan and a set of immediate measures to provide housing for those families whose homes have been destroyed.

== Name ==
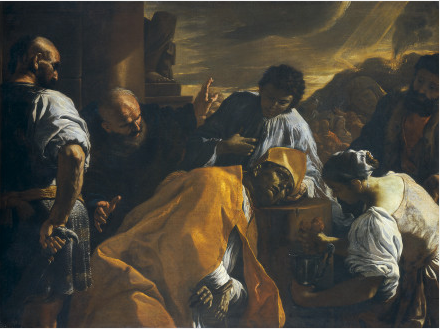
Volcanic vents on La Palma have sometimes been named after the saint of the day they erupted. In this case, the saint would be Saint Januarius (san Genaro). This painting by Mattia Preti depicts his beheading with Vesuvius in eruption as a background.

The eruption source is a new vent of the Cumbre Vieja dorsal. Volcano vents on La Palma have traditionally been given either Guanche names or, more rarely and not in recent times, named after the Saint on whose feast day the eruption began. An early proposal for a Guanche name for the new vent was Jedey, after a nearby village, but this was not received favourably. A newer proposal was Tajogaite, after the Guanche name for Montaña Rajada ("Cracked Mountain"), the area directly downhill from the eruption site. This name gained wider support and was accepted in July of 2022.

== See also ==
- Cumbre Vieja tsunami hazard
- Geology of the Canary Islands
- List of volcanoes in Spain
