= Los Campitos (Los Llanos de Aridane) =

- Neighbourhood
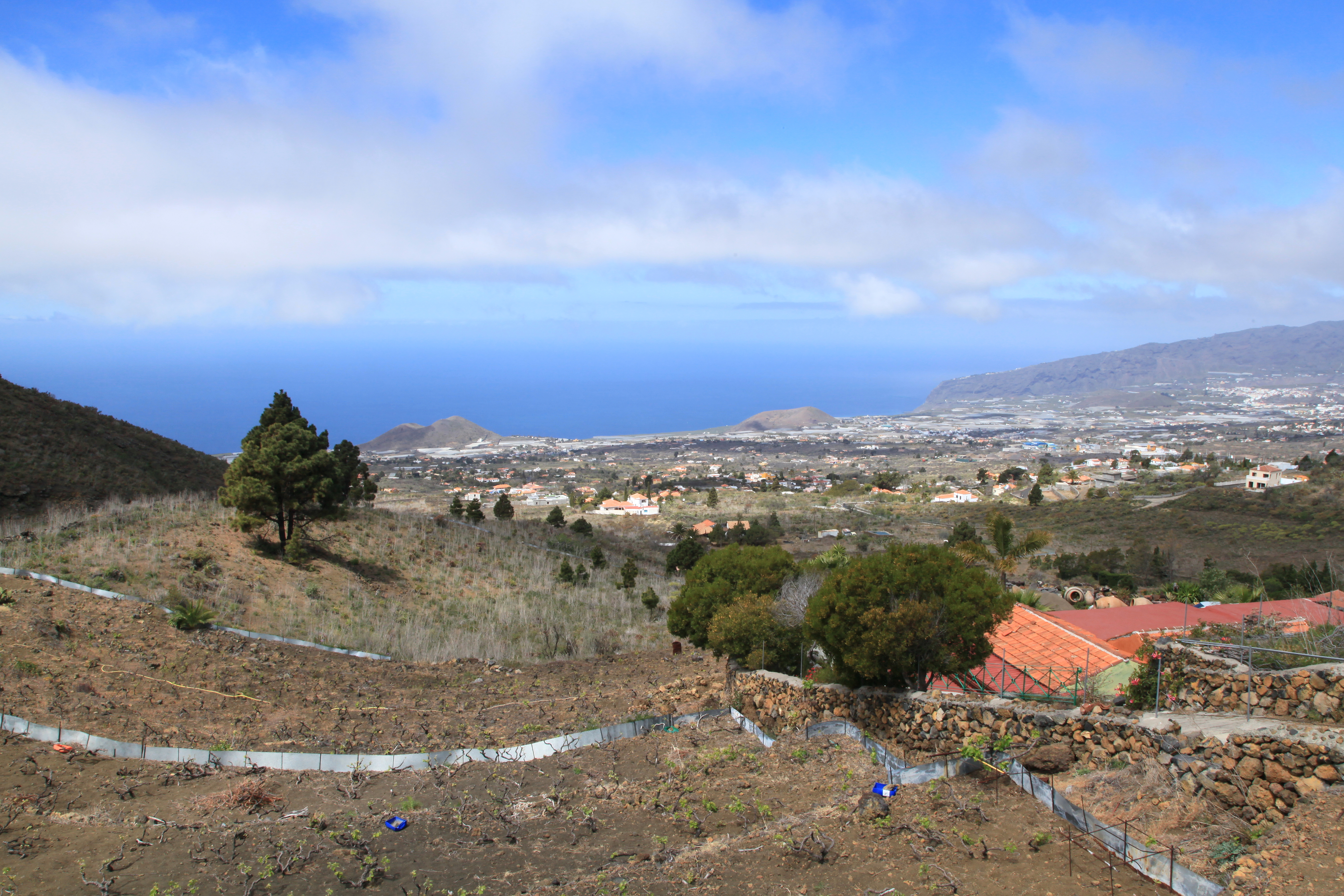
- View of the Aridane Valley from Montaña Rajada in 2015; Los Campitos can be seen in the middle

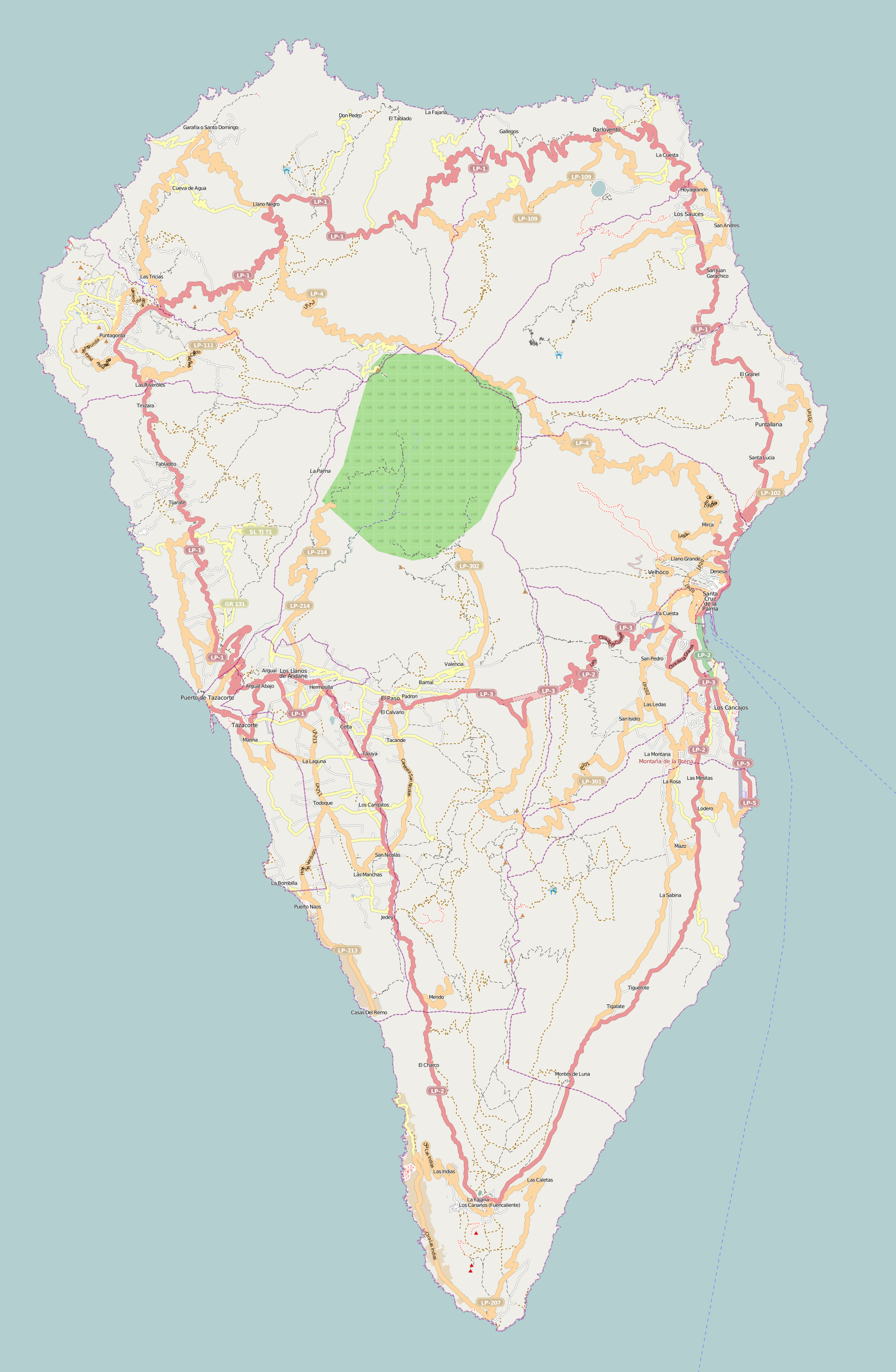
- Location in the Canary Islands Los Campitos (Canary Islands)
- Coordinates: 28°36′58.24″N 17°53′12.48″W
- Country: Spain
- Autonomous Community: Canary Islands
- Province: Santa Cruz de Tenerife
- Island: La Palma
- Municipality: Los Llanos de Aridane
- Time zone: UTC±00:00 (WET)
  - Summer (DST): UTC+01:00 (WEST)
- Postcode: 38769

Los Campitos is a neighborhood of Todoque in La Palma, Canary Islands, Spain. Formerly it was a separate locality, integrated into Todoque in 2000. It was destroyed by a lava flow from the 2021 Cumbre Vieja volcanic eruption, which destroyed hundreds of houses in the neighborhood and ended up engulfing it entirely.

== Description ==
Los Campitos is located at an altitude of 500 metres (1,600 ft) above sea level, 5 kilometres (3 mi) south of the urban area of Los Llanos de Aridane. It comprises the easternmost part of the town of Todoque, bordering Las Manchas on the south.

Agriculture of the area consisted of dryland farming and livestock farming. The settlements are scattered, with most building located next to Camino El Pastelero road, which runs from main part of Todoque in the west to the LP-2 main road (Carretera del Sur de La Palma), and next to the LP-2 road itself.

Los Campitos used to have a local one-room school, which was attended by children of the neighborhood also the neighborhood of El Paraíso in Las Manchas.

== History ==
At the end of the 15th century, the place was part of the aboriginal canton of Tihuya. After the conquest and incorporation of the island to the Crown of Castile, the area came to be considered as communal land. According to Gaspar Frutuoso, the place was mainly dedicated to livestock, and its inhabitants were mainly descendants of the Palmerian aborigines, although there were also settlers of European origin.

In 1847, José María Wangüemert de Alcalá, a contributor to Pascual Madoz's geographic handbook, made a description of the Los Campitos settlement as having 69 houses and 263 inhabitants: 149 males and 114 females. It was also described that water was obtained at that time in Argual and Tazacorte as there were no ponds to collect winter water. The locality had 428 inhabitants in 1950 and 356 inhabitants in 1981.

Territory of the neighbourhood was strongly affected by the 2021 Cumbre Vieja volcanic eruption. The lava flows destroyed a large number of homes and buildings, including the school (Colegio de Educación Infantil y Primaria Los Campitos), practically erasing Los Campitos from the map.

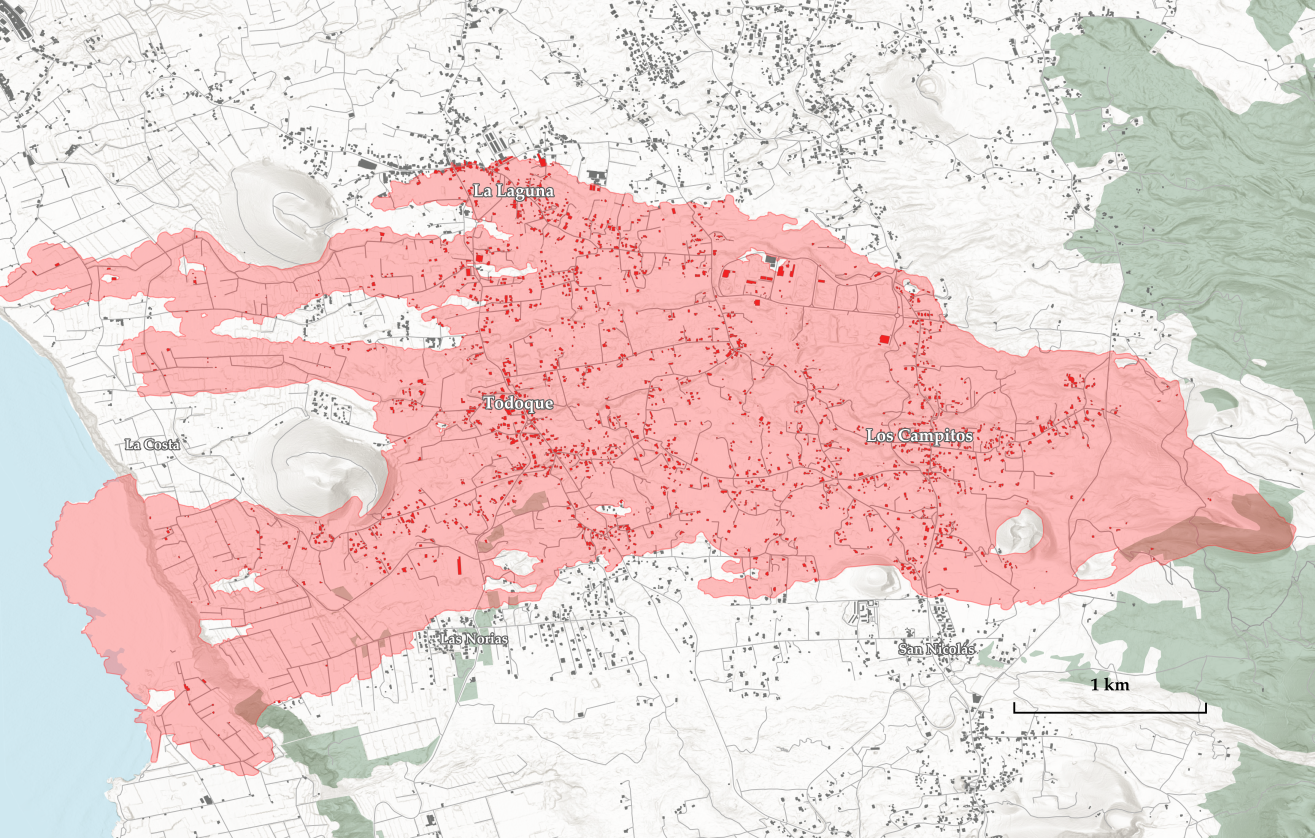
Extent of lava coverage with highlight of destroyed buildings i.a. in Los Campitos as of November 23, 2021

== See also ==
- Todoque
- La Laguna
