= Todoque =

- Ghost town
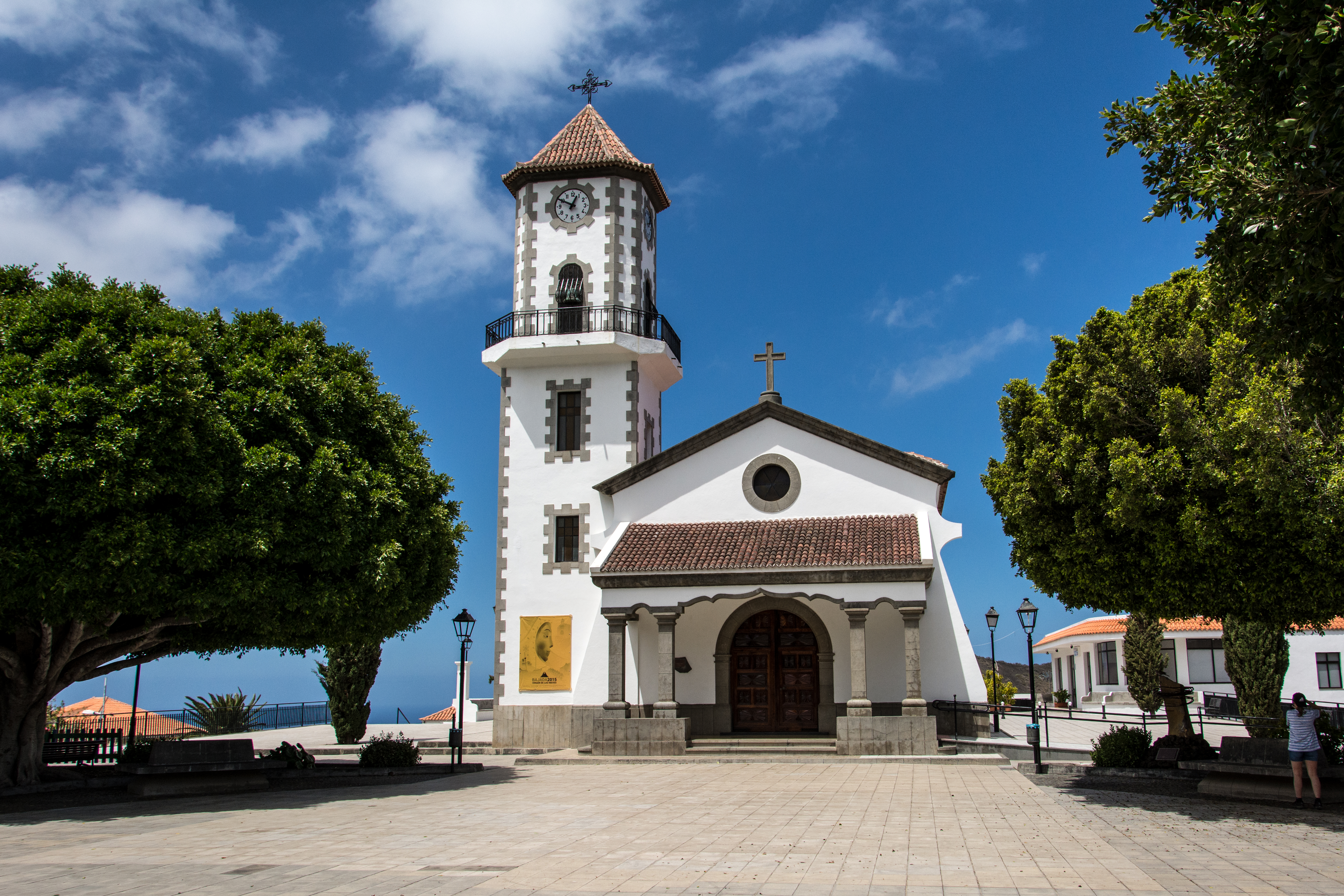
- Iglesia de San Pío X prior to the 2021 Cumbre Vieja volcanic eruption

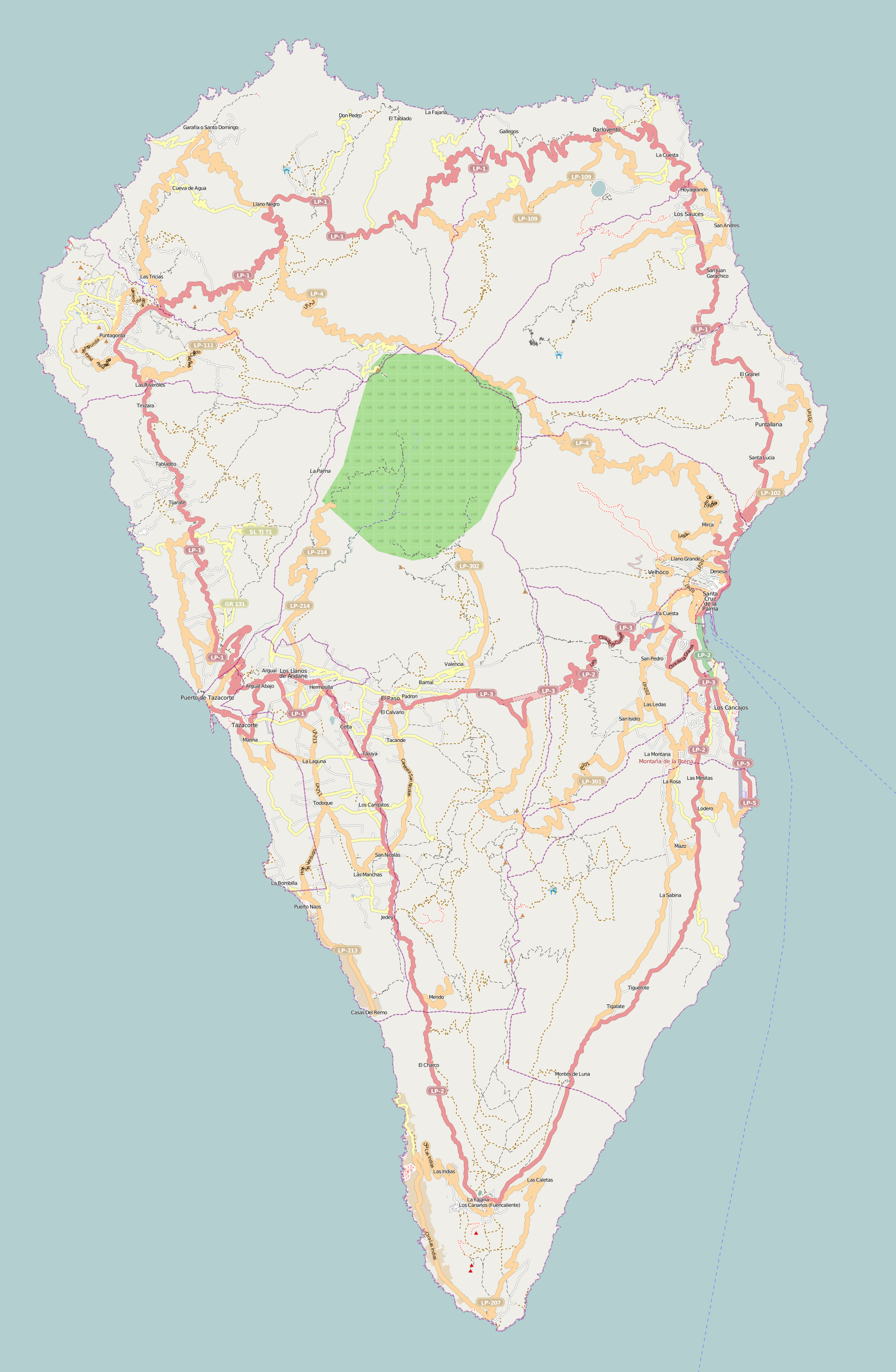
- Location in the Canary Islands Todoque (La Palma) Todoque (Canary Islands)
- Coordinates: 28°37′00″N 17°54′08″W
- Country: Spain
- Autonomous Community: Canary Islands
- Province: Santa Cruz de Tenerife
- Island: La Palma
- Municipality: Los Llanos de Aridane

Population (2020)
  - Total: 1,310
- Current population unknown. (Note: The official population estimates for the Todoque statistical area were in 2019: 1253, 2020: 1310, 2021: 1307, 2022: 1307, 2023: 986 and for the larger Los Llanos de Aridane region in 2019: 20467, 2020: 20760, 2021: 20648, 2022: 20551 and 2023: 20189. It is unclear how promptly the estimated population reflects the processes of surrendering land titles and the new developments outside of the 2021 lava field.)
- Time zone: UTC±00:00 (WET)
  - Summer (DST): UTC+01:00 (WEST)
- Postcode: 38769

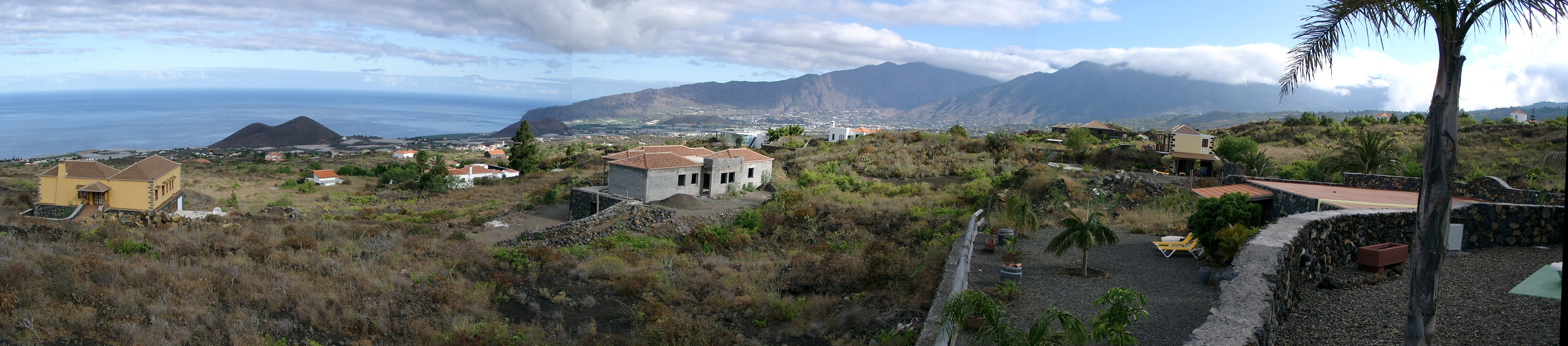
Panorama of Todoque in 2006

Todoque is a ghost town belonging to the municipality of Los Llanos de Aridane, located in the southwest of the island of La Palma, Canary Islands. Its main neighborhoods were Todoque, Los Pasitos and Todoque de Arriba. The town was first badly damaged and many buildings destroyed by the Cumbre Vieja volcano eruption in September 2021, which ended up engulfing it entirely.

== Toponymy ==
Todoque became a district of Los Llanos de Aridane with the name of Tedoque, both popularly and officially until the beginning of the 20th century. Its name comes from the aboriginal language, specifically from the word tedote. Most likely the Auritas distinguished between bare mountain ten/tene(r) and mountain covered with brush, tedote in reference to the volcano covered with scrub or volcanic cone that is located in Todoque. Also with the word ten/tene/tener have there is a rich toponymy that comes from the aboriginal language: Tenibucar, Tenerra, Tinizara (<Tenizara), Tenisca, Teneguía, Tendiña, Tenerife (white mountain). Abreu Galindo says: «The natives of the island of La Palma, gave it this name, Tenerife, made up of two dictions: tener, which means mountain and (sic) ife, which is white».

== History ==
At the end of the 15th century, the area was part of the aboriginal canton of Tihuya, which stretched from the canton of Aridane to the mountain of Tamanca. It would cover the areas known as Tajuya, Todoque, Puerto Naos, La Laguna and part of Las Manchas. In 2020 the population in the statistical area was estimated to be 1310.

=== 2021 Cumbre Vieja volcanic eruption ===
In September and October 2021, its territory was affected by the Cumbre Vieja volcanic eruption. On September 21, the lava flow reached the town and during the following days hundreds of buildings were destroyed, including the church of Saint Pius X, the health center, the headquarters of the neighborhood association, the School of Early Childhood Education, and Los Campitos Elementary School and the Todoque Elementary and the Infant Education School. On October 10, new lava flows destroyed the buildings that were still standing, leaving the town practically erased from the map.

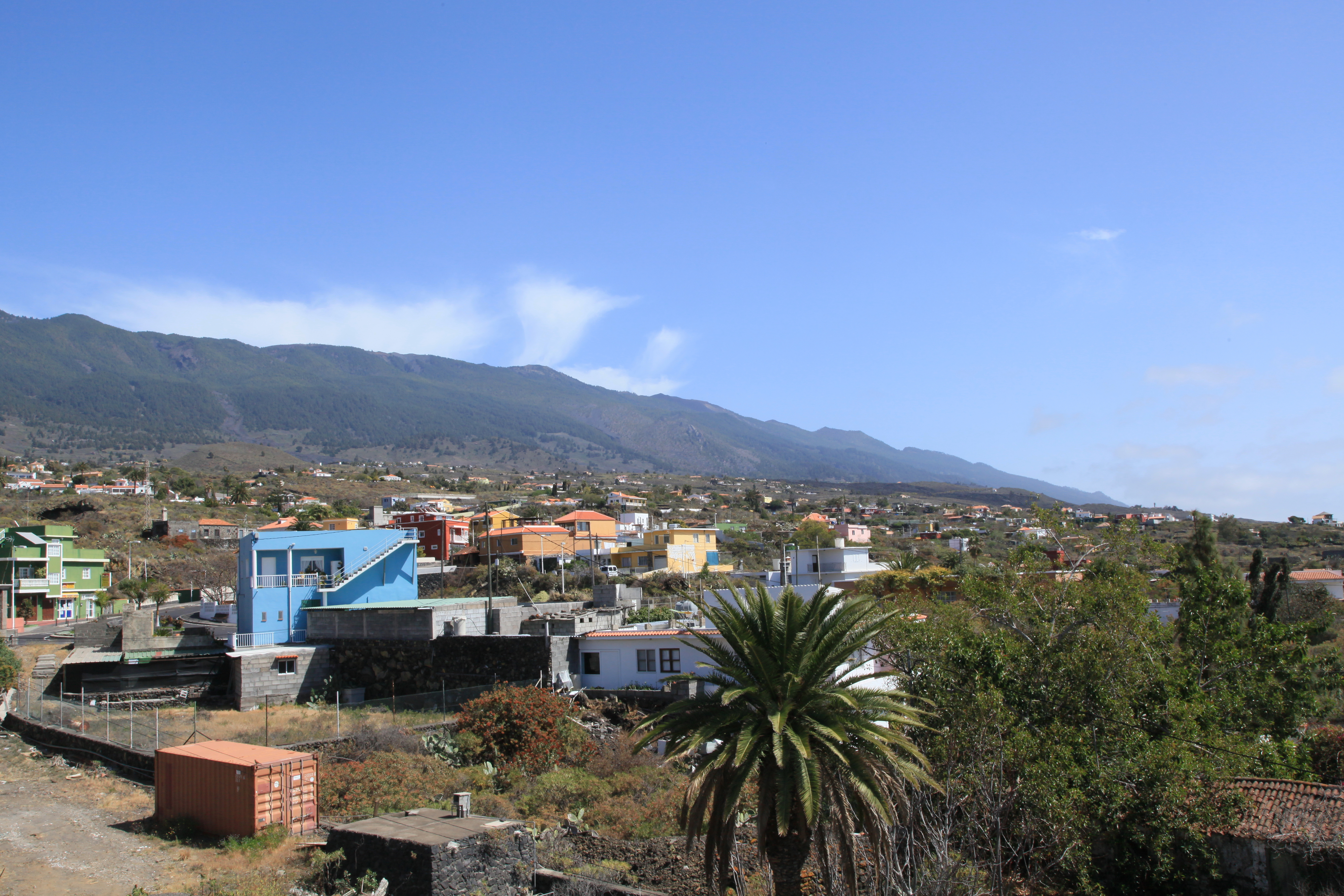
Todoque in 2015

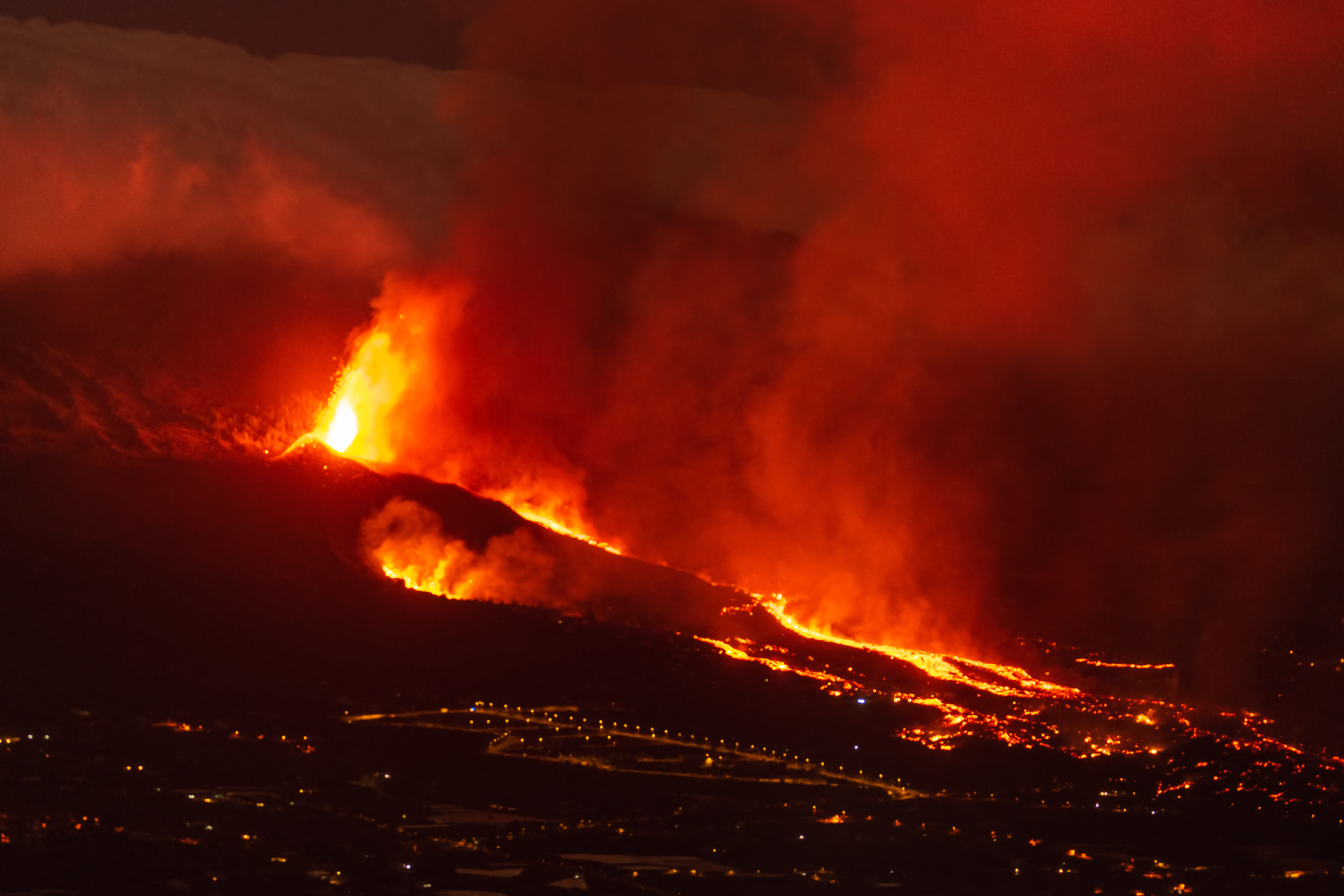
Volcanic eruption on the night of September 20, 2021, with the lava flowing towards Todoque

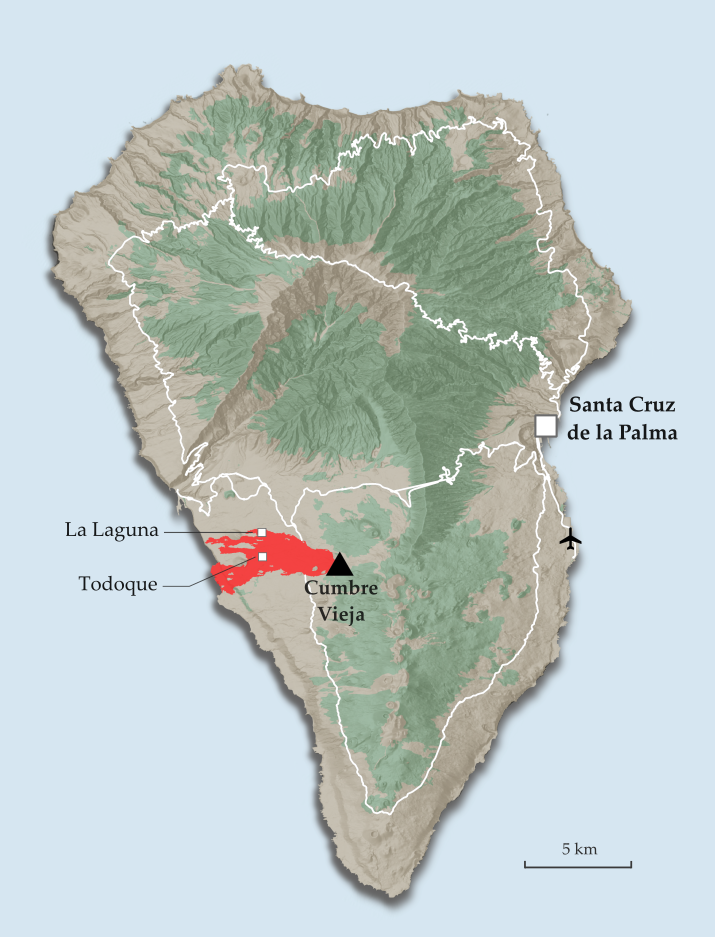
Location of Todoque within the lava flow on November 23, 2021

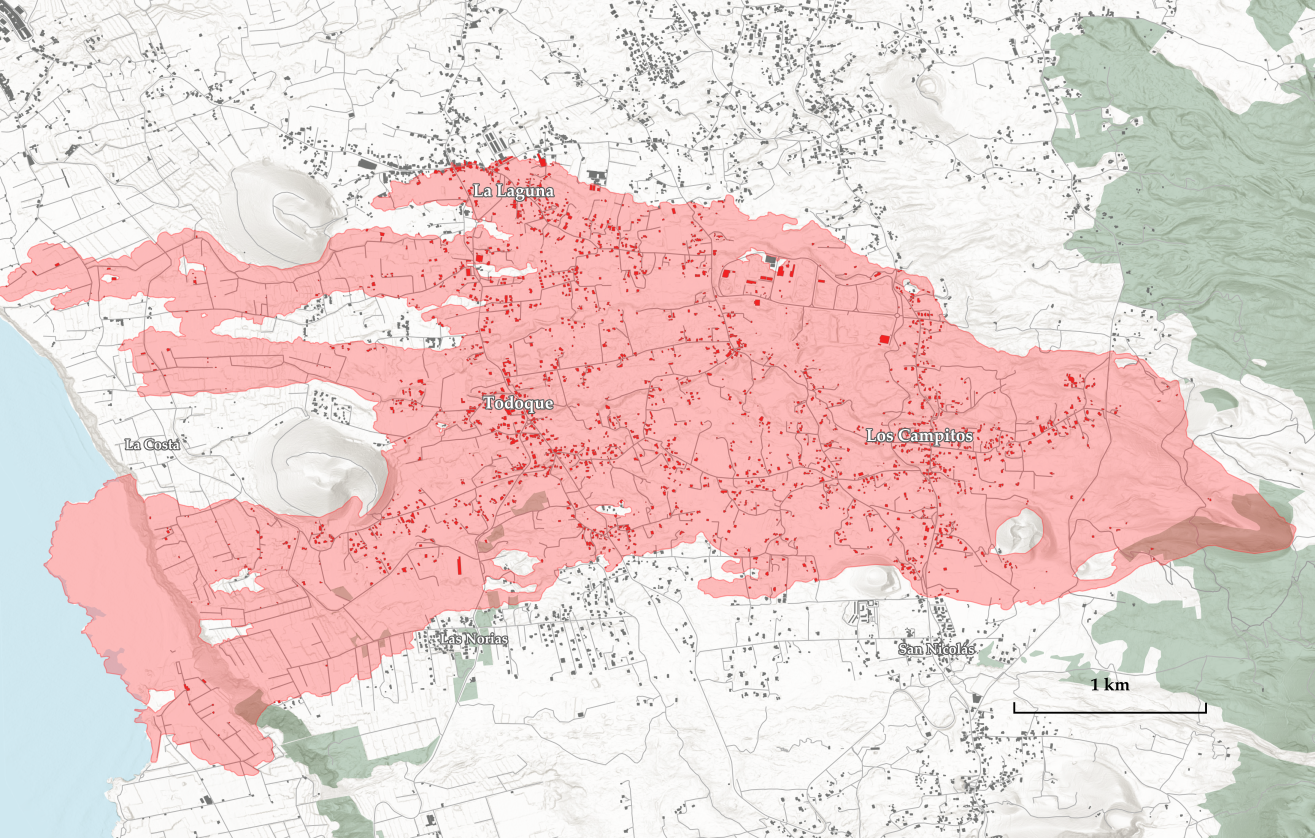
Extent of lava coverage with highlight of destroyed buildings i.a. in Todoque on November 23, 2021

=== Nuevo Todoque ===
In November 2021, while the volcanic eruption was still continuing, a new neighborhood called "Nuevo Todoque" was proposed, to be located south of the destroyed town, on a 400,000-square-metre (4,300,000 sq ft) plot of land with 543 homes, despite the fact that it is located in an area of high volcanic risk. In March 2023, the service organization Rotary International, supported the construction of a school that will replace those in Todoque (Colegio de Educación Infantil y Primaria Todoque) and Los Campitos (Colegio de Educación Infantil y Primaria Los Campitos), destroyed by the volcanic eruption, in Nuevo Todoque, south of the lava fields. The organization will contribute one million euros for the construction of the future school.

In 2023 the estimated population in the Todoque statistical area was 986.

== Culture ==
- Iglesia de San Pío X, burned and collapsed by the lava flow on 26 September 2021.
