= Tajogaite =

Volcano in the Canary Islands

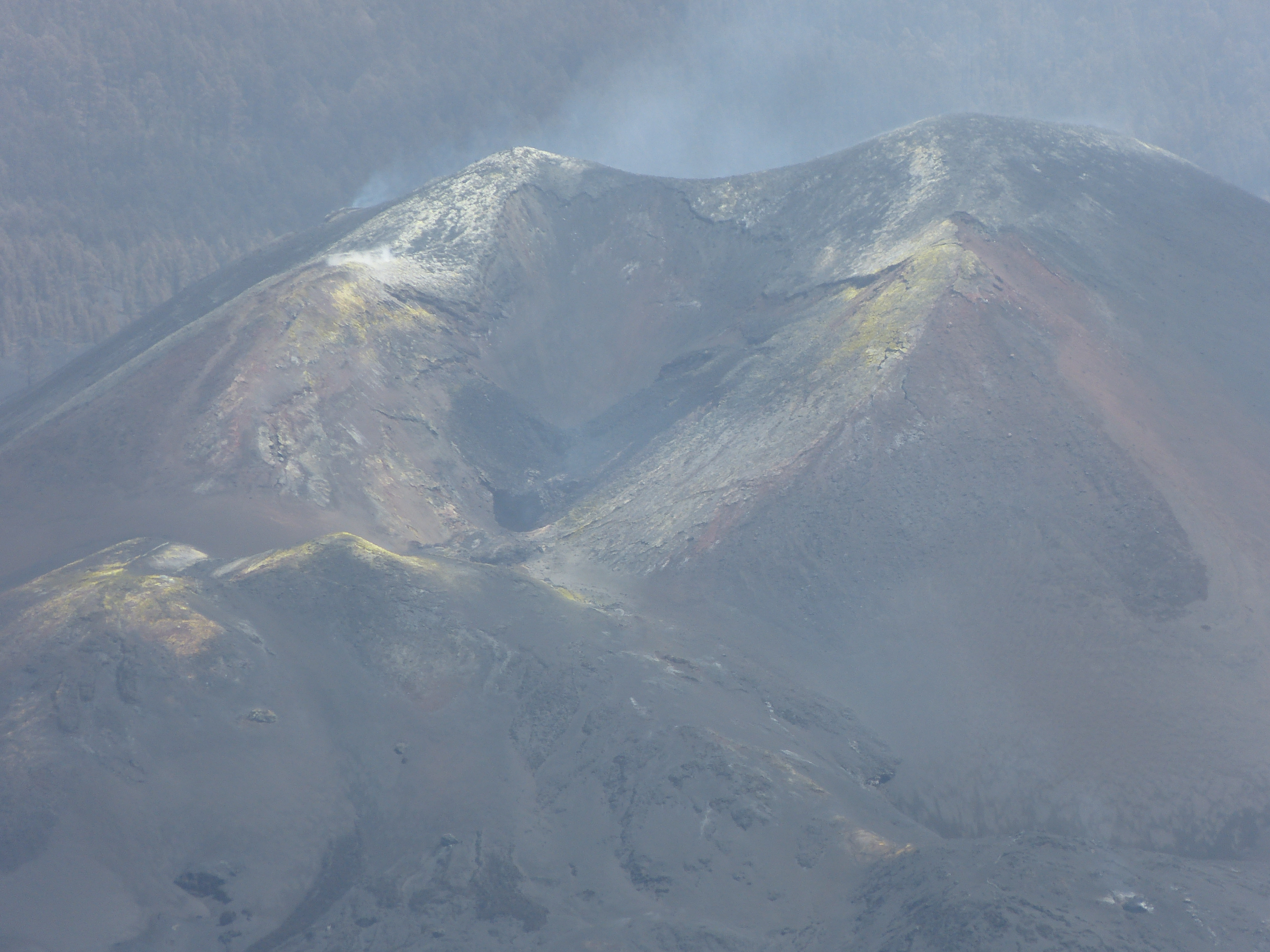
- The monogenetic cone of Tajogaite in 2022.

Highest point
- Elevation: 1,120 m (3,670 ft)
- Coordinates: 28°36′46″N 17°51′58″W

Geography
- Location: La Palma, Canary Islands, Spain

Geology
- Mountain type: Cinder cone
- Last eruption: 19 September to 13 December 2021

Tajogaite or Tajogaite Volcano (Spanish: Volcán de Tajogaite) is a monogenetic cinder cone of Cumbre Vieja located in the municipality of El Paso on the island of La Palma, Canary Islands. It originated in the eruption that began on 19 September 2021, the most recent on the island and in the national terrestrial geography. It stopped on 13 December 2021, after 85 days of activity, being the longest historical eruption recorded on the island and third in the archipelago.

== Name ==
Tajogaite is the name given to an area of the island of La Palma belonging to the municipality of El Paso and located south of Los Romanciaderos, close to Montaña Rajada. The toponym appears frequently from the 18th century on in local records linked to land ownership, however its use dates back to times when the Benahoarites inhabited the island.

== Characteristics ==
The volcano is 1,120 metres (3,670 ft) above sea level, with the cone of the volcano being approximately 200 metres (660 ft) high. The main crater is 172 metres (564 ft) long and 106 metres (348 ft) wide, and is one of seven vents. The Tajogaite eruption was associated with a magma-gas decoupled system, which resulted in 7-16% of the total erupted volume being made up of tephra.

== Lava tubes ==
The eruption of Tajogaite created an extensive system of lava tubes. The tubes, which were spotted in the midst of the 2021 eruption, were first explored in June 2022 after work crews rebuilding roads over the hardened lava. The system, which extends between 20 metres (66 ft) to 60 metres (200 ft) under the hardened lava flow, is made up of three distinct levels and may be the longest in Europe. Despite the tubes reaching temperatures of 60 °C (140 °F), Pseudomonadota and Bacteroidota bacteria have been found colonising the walls of the tubes.

== Reconstruction ==
The Special Commissioner for the Reconstruction of the island of La Palma, created in 2022 to coordinate and promote the actions adopted by the General State Administration to repair the damage caused by volcanic eruptions and for the reconstruction of the island of La Palma. It has the rank of Under Secretary and it depends from the Ministry of the Presidency, although functionally from the Ministry of Development. Hector Izquierdo Triana, born in La Palma and secretary of state for finance at that time, was appointed to this responsibility. On 31 July 2024 he was awarded the Grand Cross of the Royal Order of Civil Merit.
