= Iglesia de San Pío X (Todoque) =

Church of Saint Pius X
- Iglesia de San Pío X
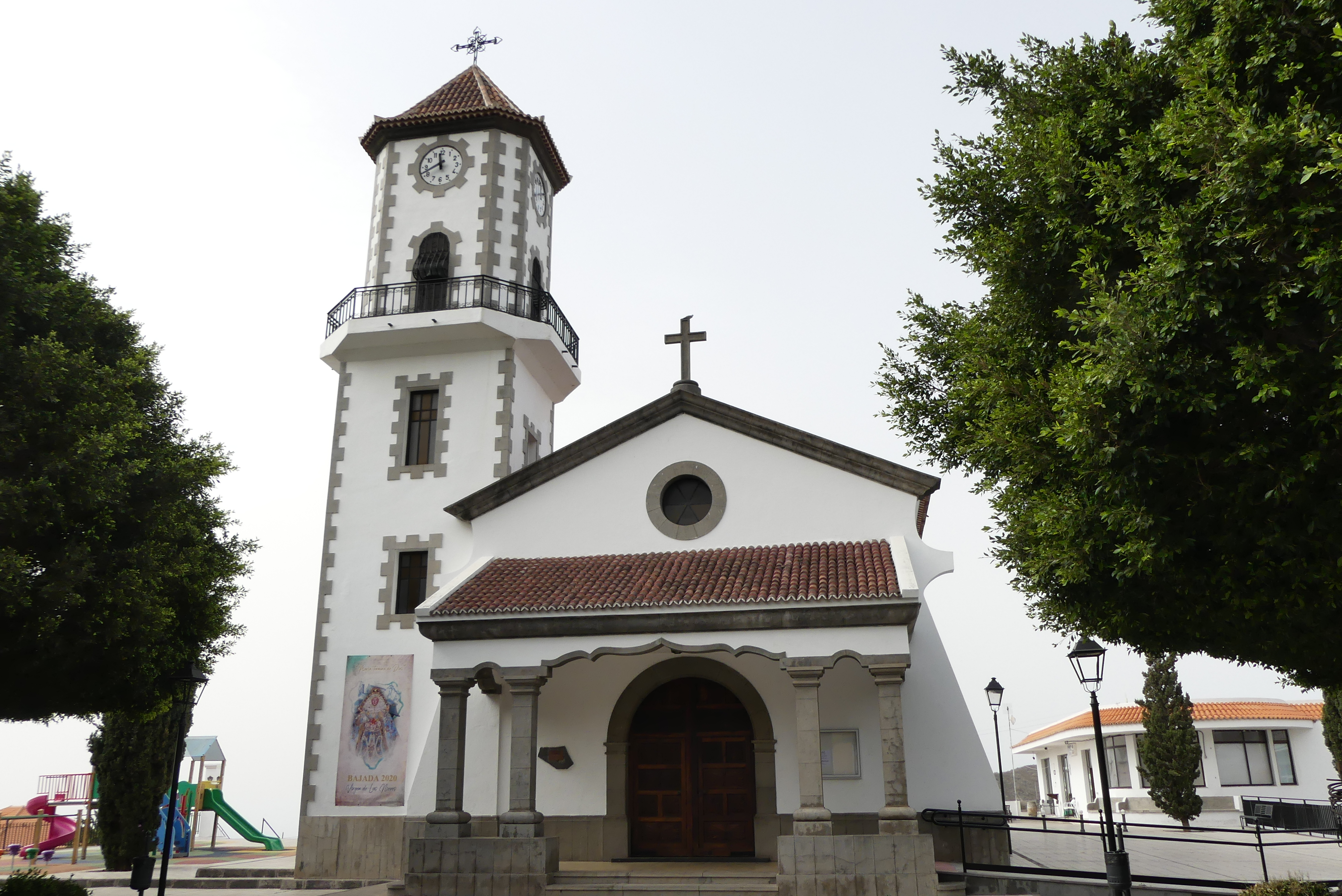
- The church in 2020
- Interactive map of the Church of Saint Pius X area

General information
- Status: Church
- Location: Todoque, Los Llanos de Aridane, Spain
- Coordinates: 28°37′09″N 17°54′18″W
- Inaugurated: 30 May 1954
- Destroyed: 26 September 2021

The Church of Saint Pius X (Spanish: Iglesia de San Pío X) was a Catholic church located in Todoque, Los Llanos de Aridane, La Palma (Canary Islands, Spain). Built in 1954 and destroyed during the 2021 Cumbre Vieja volcanic eruption, it was the world's first church dedicated to Pope Pius X.

== Description ==
=== Exterior ===
The church, erected after the end of the postwar period by the inhabitants of the town themselves and located on land donated by a neighbor of the area, presented a simple facade framed in the popular Canarian architectural style, although with a clear Mudejar influence.

Built of brick the front wall had a small projection with a shape slightly similar to a trapezoid, while the entrance, in a semicircular arch, was located under a simple-made rose window and a porch with a sloping roof and roof made of Arabic tile supported by four columns with a rectangular base supported on pronounced bases and surmounted by capitals of the Tuscan order. With a gabled roof with prominent buttresses and enclosed windows, to the left of the main facade was the bell tower, with a square plan and two sections with a balcony, a clock and a conical dome with an octagonal base surmounted by a cross. To the left of the entrance door there was a small plaque with the following inscription:

PRIMER TEMPLO DEL ORBE CATÓLICO
DEDICADO A LA ADVOCACIÓN DEL
GRAN PONTÍFICE DE LA EUCARISTIA
PIO X
XXX - V - MCMLIV
TODOQUE 19 - 8 - 84

(Translation: First church in the Catholic world dedicated to the advocation of the Great Pontiff of the Eucharist, Pius X. 30 May 1954. Todoque, 19 August 1984)

=== Interior ===
The interior, with a rectangular floor plan and a single nave, had a checkered floor and a wooden ceiling. Of great ornamental simplicity, the main chapel, decorated with an altarpiece, had a rectangular floor plan and was located behind a semicircular arch supported by inlaid columns with a square base. The main altarpiece consisted of a body with three streets, a bench and an attic, all made of polychrome and marbled wood. The central niche, with a segmental arch and framed by pilasters, housed a carving of the crucified Christ of great pathos, while the lateral ones, with a semicircular arch and veined, were half the size of the central niche and showed a carving of the Virgin of Carmel on the left and a larger image of Pope Pius X on the right. Between the lateral niches and the attic, friezes stood out which presented, on the left and right respectively, the shields of the Virgin of Carmel and Pius X framed by pilasters as well as the lateral niches and separated from these by simple cornices. The attic, surrounded by fins and pinnacles and crowned by a triangular pediment, showed the pictorial images of God the Father, Jesus and the Holy Spirit in the form of a dove, forming the iconography of the Holy Trinity.

== Destruction ==
On 19 September 2021, an eruption began in the pine forest called Cabeza de Vaca, in the municipality of El Paso, leaving the church that same day within the security perimeter established by the authorities. Sixteen hours later, three lava flows were produced which reached a height of six metres. By 2:00 p.m. on 21 September, the main lava flow had reached the locality of Todoque at a speed of approximately 120 metres per hour. Various elements of the church's furniture were removed, such as images, paintings, liturgical objects and relics. The altarpiece could not be dismantled, and was destroyed along with the benches. After a period of slowdown (four metres per hour), the lava was reactivated reaching an average speed of around 100 metres per hour, passing the Todoque neighborhood and running about 150 metres to the west of the centre of the population centre. Affected by the lava, at 5:55 p.m. on 26 September, the bell tower of the temple collapsed on itself, an event broadcast live by the BTC Connection program of Radio Televisión Canaria and also recorded by several amateur videographers.
