= Vog =

Air pollution resulting from volcanic gases reacting with the atmosphere

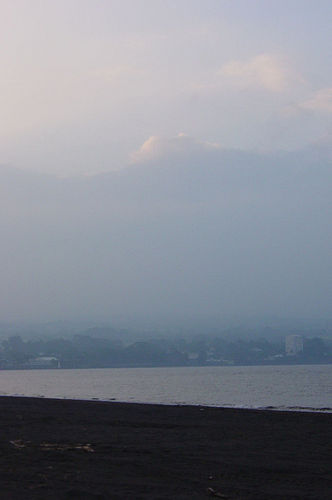
Dense vog as seen from Hilo Bay, Hawaiʻi

Vog is a form of air pollution that results when sulfur dioxide and other gases and particles emitted by an erupting volcano react with oxygen and moisture in the presence of sunlight. The word is a portmanteau of the words volcanic and smog, the latter itself a portmanteau of smoke and fog. The term is in common use in the Hawaiian Islands, where the Kīlauea volcano, on the Island of Hawaiʻi (the "Big Island"), erupted continuously between 1983 and 2018. Based in June 2008 measurements, Kīlauea emits 2,000–4,000 tons of sulfur dioxide (SO_{2}) every day.

== Description ==
Vog is created when volcanic gases (primarily oxides of sulfur) react with sunlight, oxygen and moisture. The result includes sulfuric acid and other sulfates. Vog is made up of a mixture of gases and aerosols which makes it hard to study and potentially more dangerous than either on their own.

Vog, which originates from volcanic vents, differs from laze, created when lava enters the ocean.

The Volcanic winter of 536 has reports of "A dense, dry fog" in the Middle East, China and Europe.

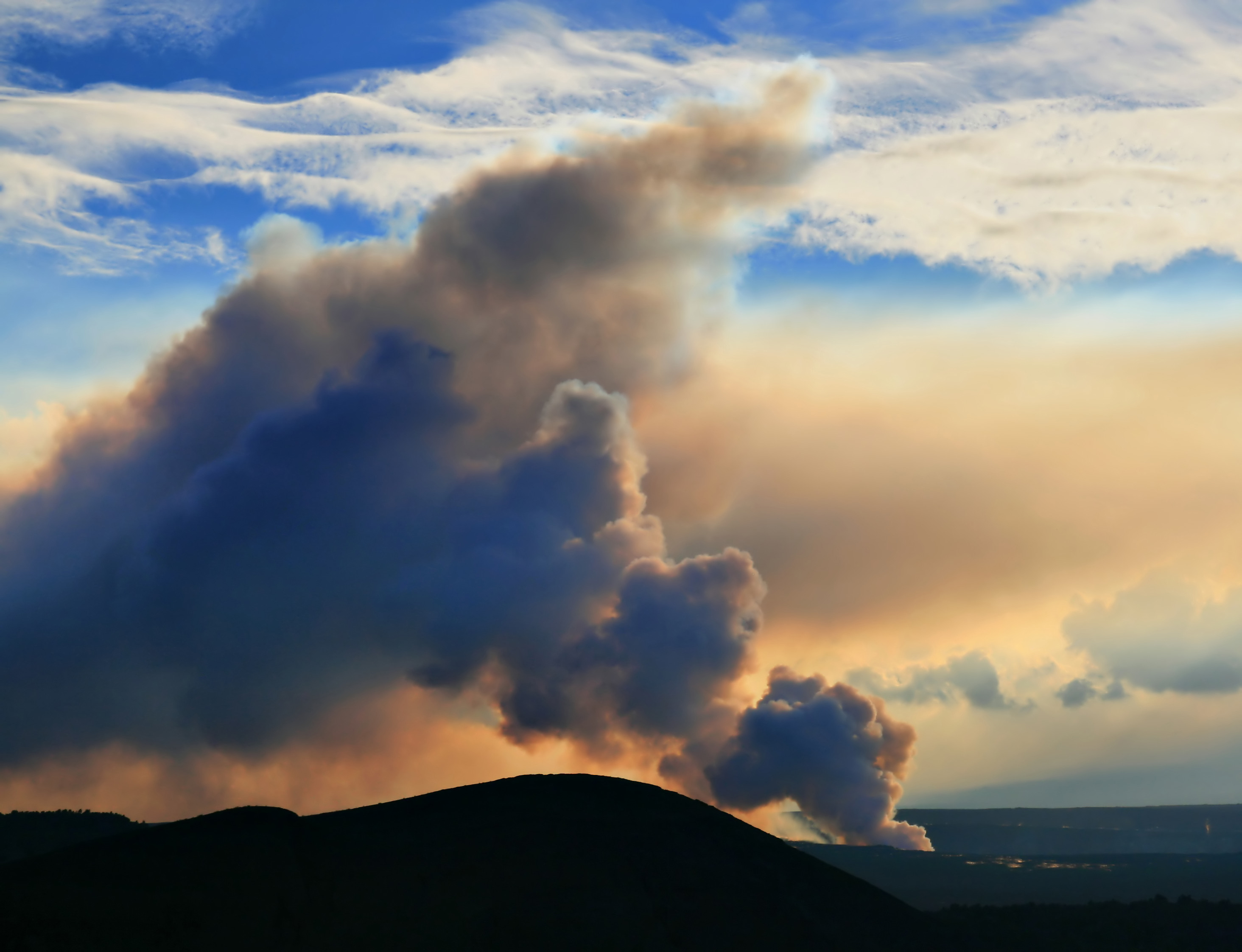
Sulfur dioxide emissions from Halemaʻumaʻu creates vog.

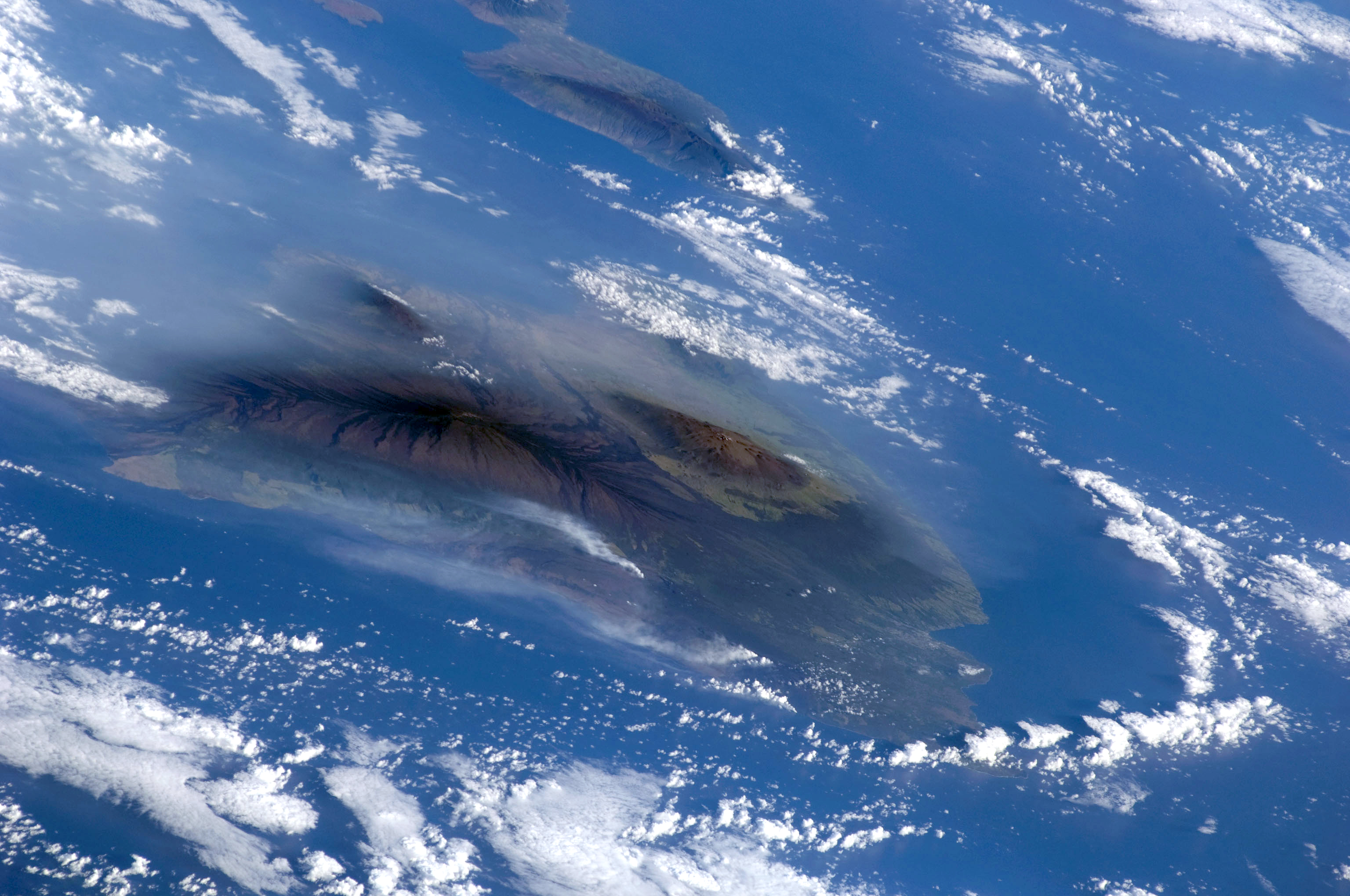
Volcanic plumes as seen from Space Shuttle Atlantis

== Vog in Hawaii ==
In Hawaii, the gas plumes of Kīlauea rise up from three locations: Halemaʻumaʻu, Puʻu ʻŌʻō, and from along the coastline where lava flows from the East Rift zone enter the ocean. The plumes create a blanket of vog that can envelop the island. Vog mostly affects the Kona coast on the west side of the Island of Hawaii, where the prevailing trade winds blow the vog to the southwest and southern winds then blow it north up the Kohala coast.

Prolonged periods of southerly Kona winds, however, can cause vog to affect the eastern side of the Island on rare occasions, and affect islands across the entire state as well. By the time the vog reaches other islands, the sulfur dioxide has largely dissipated, leaving behind ash, smoke, sulfates, and ammonia.

During the 2016 volcanic events at Kīlauea, the Hawaiian Volcano Observatory, in collaboration with other agencies, published a vog dashboard so community members could track the vog.

== Comparing vog and smog ==
Vog and smog are different. Vog is formed when sulfur oxides emitted by a volcano react with moisture to form an aerosol. The aerosol scatters light, thus making the vog visible. Smog is formed largely from the incomplete combustion of fuel, reacting with nitrogen oxides and ozone produced from carbon monoxide by reactions with sunlight. The result is also a visible aerosol.

When smog levels are high, the sky appears yellowish-grey because nitrogen oxides are yellow. In contrast, sulfur oxides are colorless and vog looks grey. Once the vog layer dissipates, grey spots of vog in the sky may, for a time, remain trapped in the inversion layer.

Several chemicals emitted from cars are not emitted from volcanoes. Similarly, some chemicals emitted from volcanoes, such as hydrogen sulfide, hydrogen chloride, and hydrogen fluoride, are not created by exhaust gas. Moreover, smog generated by factories has its own unique mix of contaminants.

== Health hazards ==
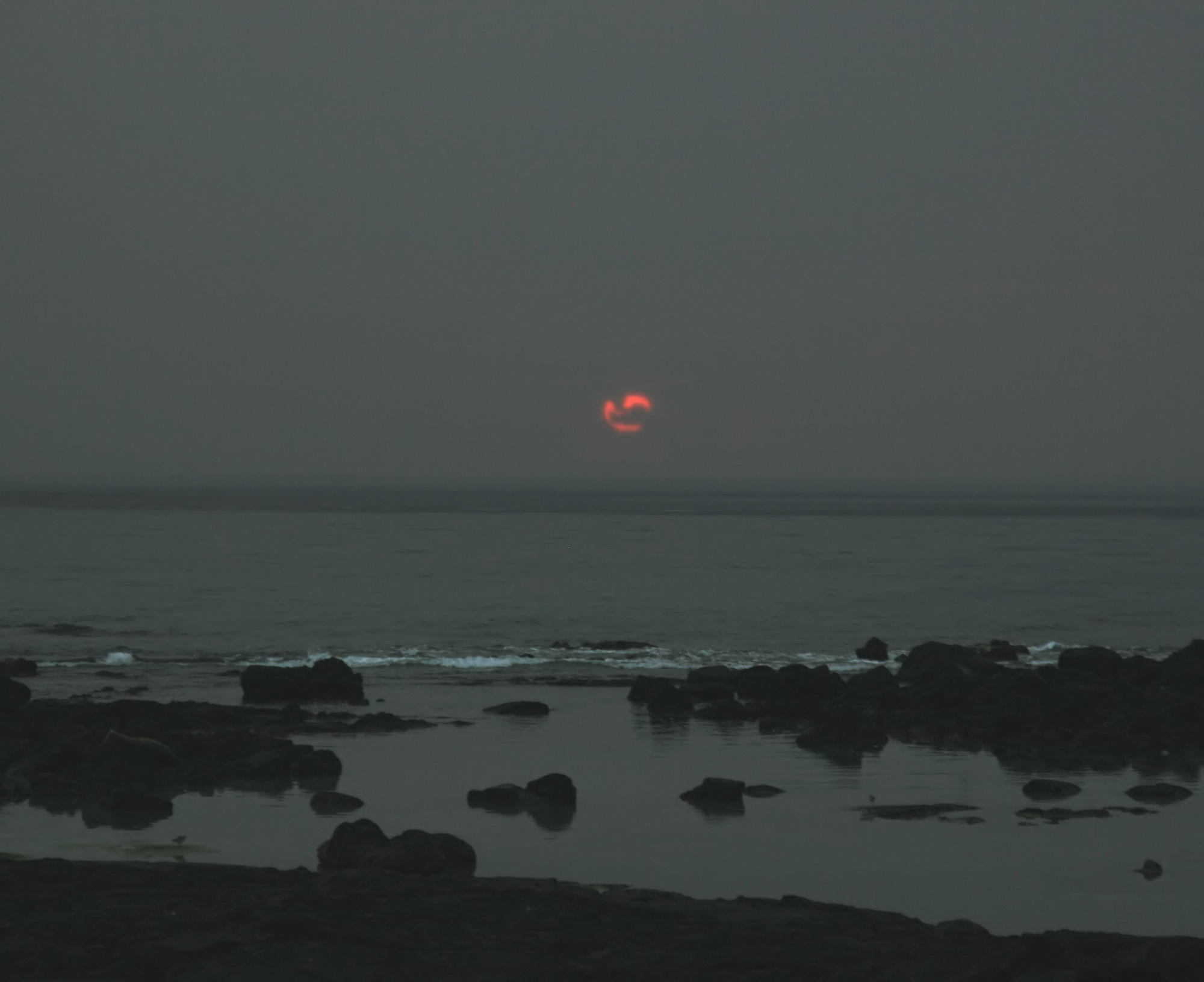
Vog and clouds created a strangely shaped sun in this sunset.

Most studies of vog have been in areas where vog is naturally present and not in controlled conditions. Vog contains chemicals that can damage the environment and the health of plants, humans and other animals. Most of the aerosols are acidic and of a size where they can remain in the lungs to damage the lungs and impair function. Headaches, watery eyes, sore throat, breathing difficulties (including inducing asthma attacks), flu-like symptoms and general lethargy are commonly reported. These effects are especially pronounced in children and in people with respiratory conditions. Vog generally reduces visibility, creating a hazard for road, air and ocean traffic.

The long-term health effects of vog are unknown.

== Recent events ==
Several studies are underway to measure the air quality near volcanoes more carefully. Sulfur dioxide emissions increased on March 12, 2008, when a new vent opened. The increased vog level has caused evacuations and damaged crops. In the summer of 2008 and in 2012, the County of Hawaiʻi received a disaster designation due to the agricultural damage.

A recent multi-year computer-modeling feasibility study, known as VMAP, designed to predict the location and concentrations of vog from Kīlauea was conducted by the University of Hawaii.

== See also ==
- Laze
- Mist Hardships
