= La Laguna (Los Llanos de Aridane) =

- Town
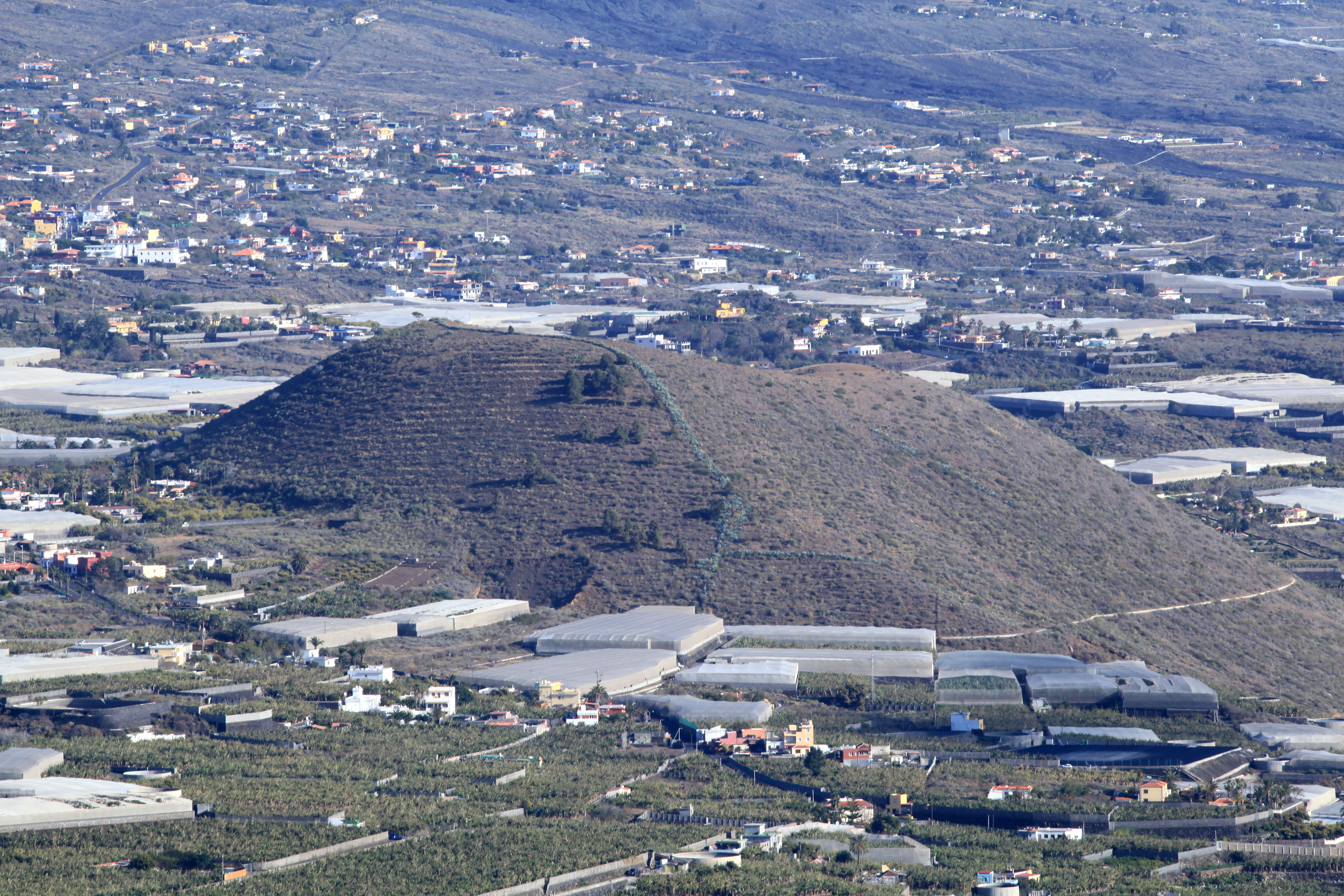
- Montaña de La Laguna

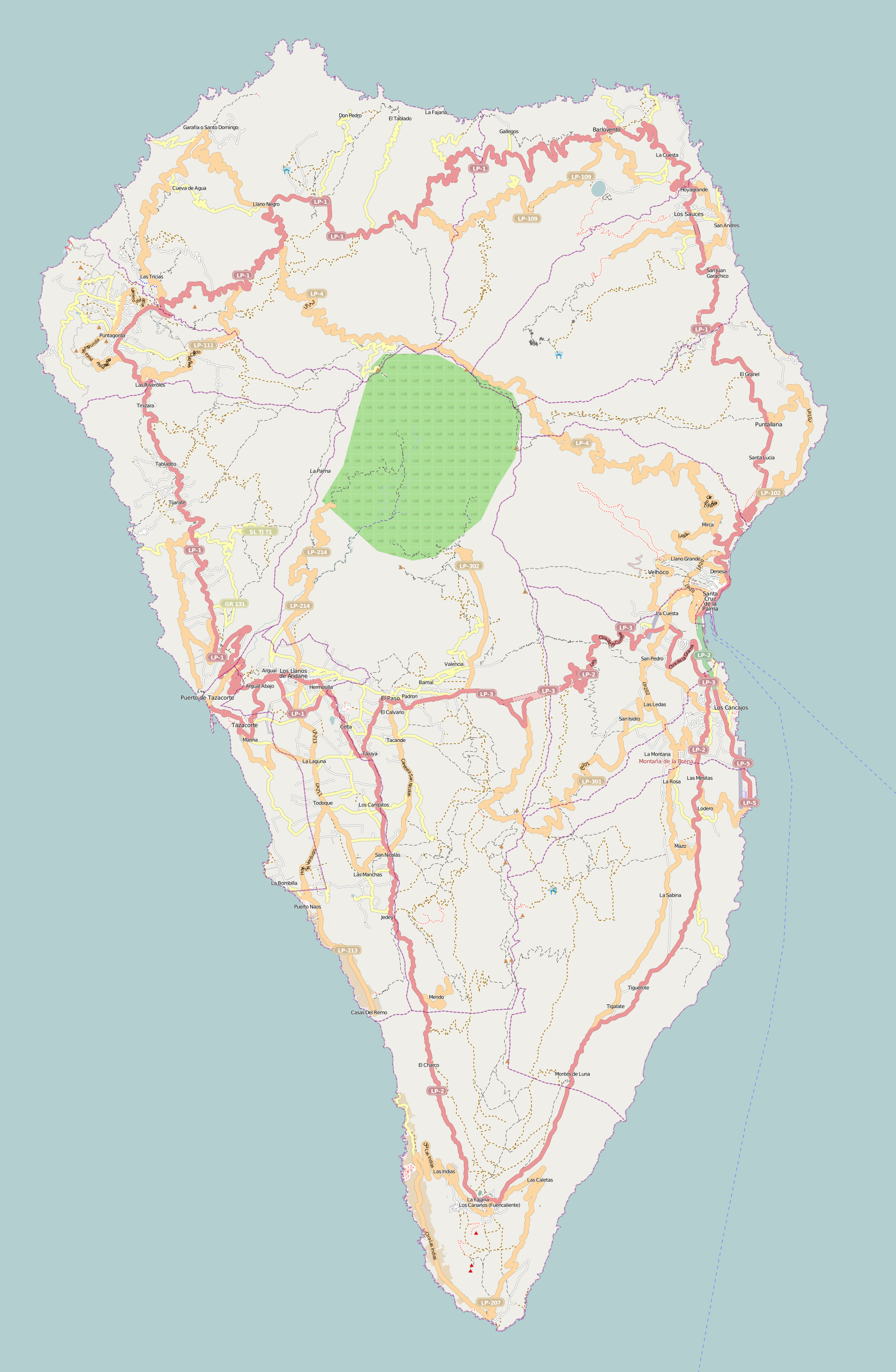
- Location within La Palma Location within Canary Islands
- Coordinates: 28°37′54″N 17°54′30″W
- Country: Spain
- Autonomous community: Canary Islands
- Province: Santa Cruz de Tenerife
- Island: La Palma
- Municipality: Los Llanos de Aridane

Population (2020)
  - Total: 1,645
- Time zone: UTC±00:00 (WET)
  - Summer (DST): UTC+01:00 (WEST)
- Postcode: 38769

La Laguna (also known until recently as Tajuya de abajo or La Laguna de Tajuya) is a town and neighbourhood of Los Llanos de Aridane, in La Palma, Canary Islands, Spain. It was significantly affected by a lava flow from the 2021 Cumbre Vieja volcanic eruption, which destroyed hundreds of houses in the town.

== History ==
The town was also known as "Tajuya de Abajo" or "La Laguna de Tajuya", with historical references dating back to the 17th century.

== Description ==
The town center is marked by the "Venta de Doña Rosario", a canopy named after a pond that would form nearby during the rainfall. The neighbourhood has few historic buildings and is better known more for the local agriculture, which has evolved over the years from sugarcane, to tomato, to banana and avocado, with many small plots owned by locals.

La Laguna has a parish church dedicated to San Isidro, the construction of which started in June 1966, funded by local donations, and significant contributions from local women.

As of 2020, it had 1645 inhabitants.

== Culture ==
It has been described as one of the more traditional Los Llanos neighbourhoods. It holds a festival in May called "La Patrona chica", a prelude to Our Lady of Los Remedios festivities in Los Llanos. It had a school since 1875. It was the location of the founding of the Velia Cultural Society in 1932.

== Volcanic eruption ==
The town was affected by the 2021 Cumbre Vieja volcanic eruption. On 14 October 202, lava consumed the town's football field, a nearby supermarket and other buildings. The town had been partially evacuated a few days earlier, which was followed by a complete evacuation of the town. Shortly afterwards, a filling station, followed by the school, and hundreds of houses in the town were destroyed by the lava flow.

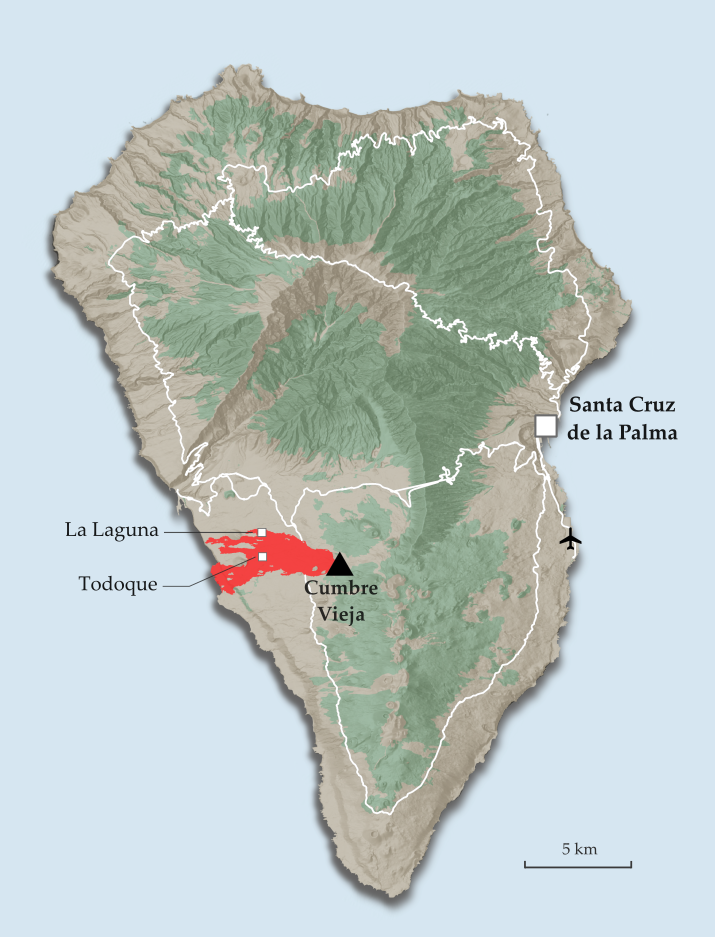
Location of La Laguna within the lava flow on November 23, 2021

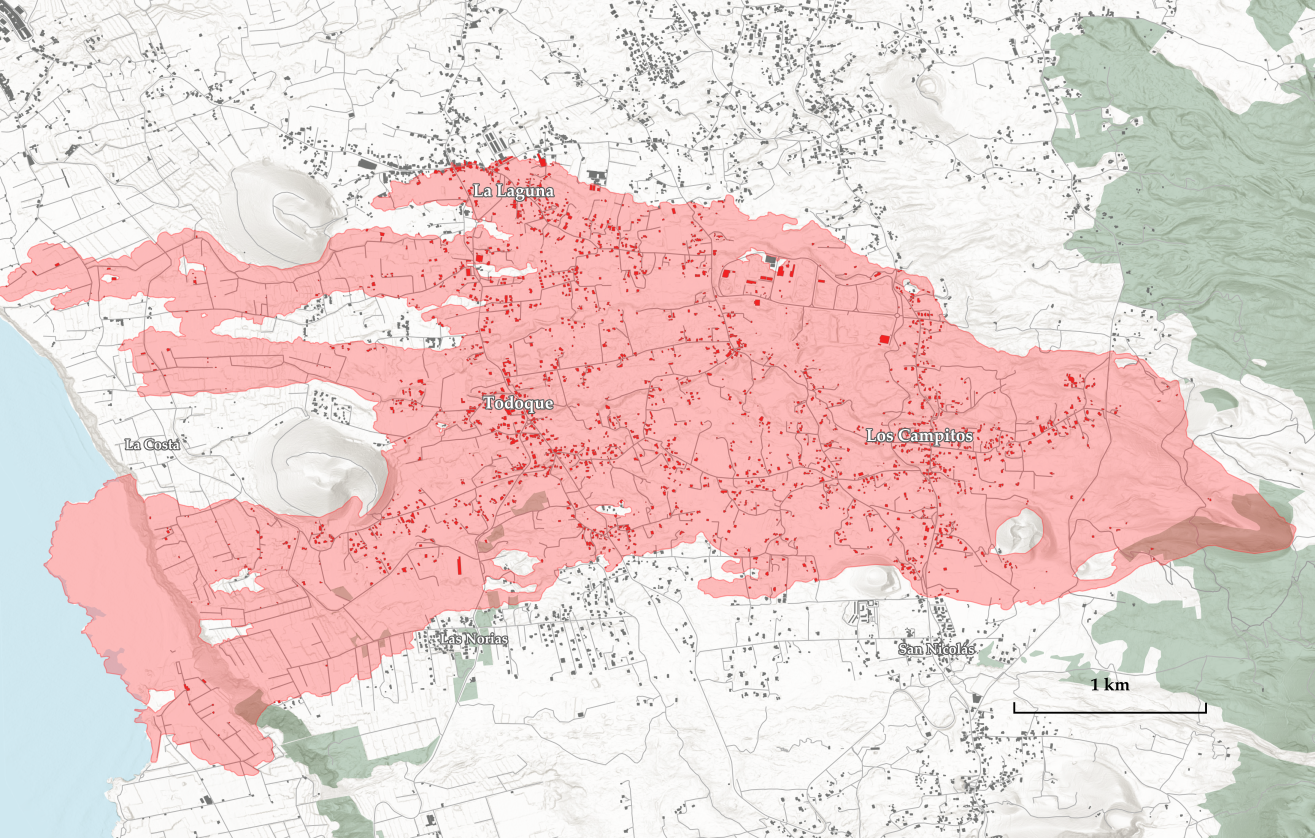
Extent of lava coverage with highlight of destroyed buildings i.a. in La Laguna on November 23, 2021
