= Laze (geology) =

Acid haze formed when molten lava enters the cold ocean

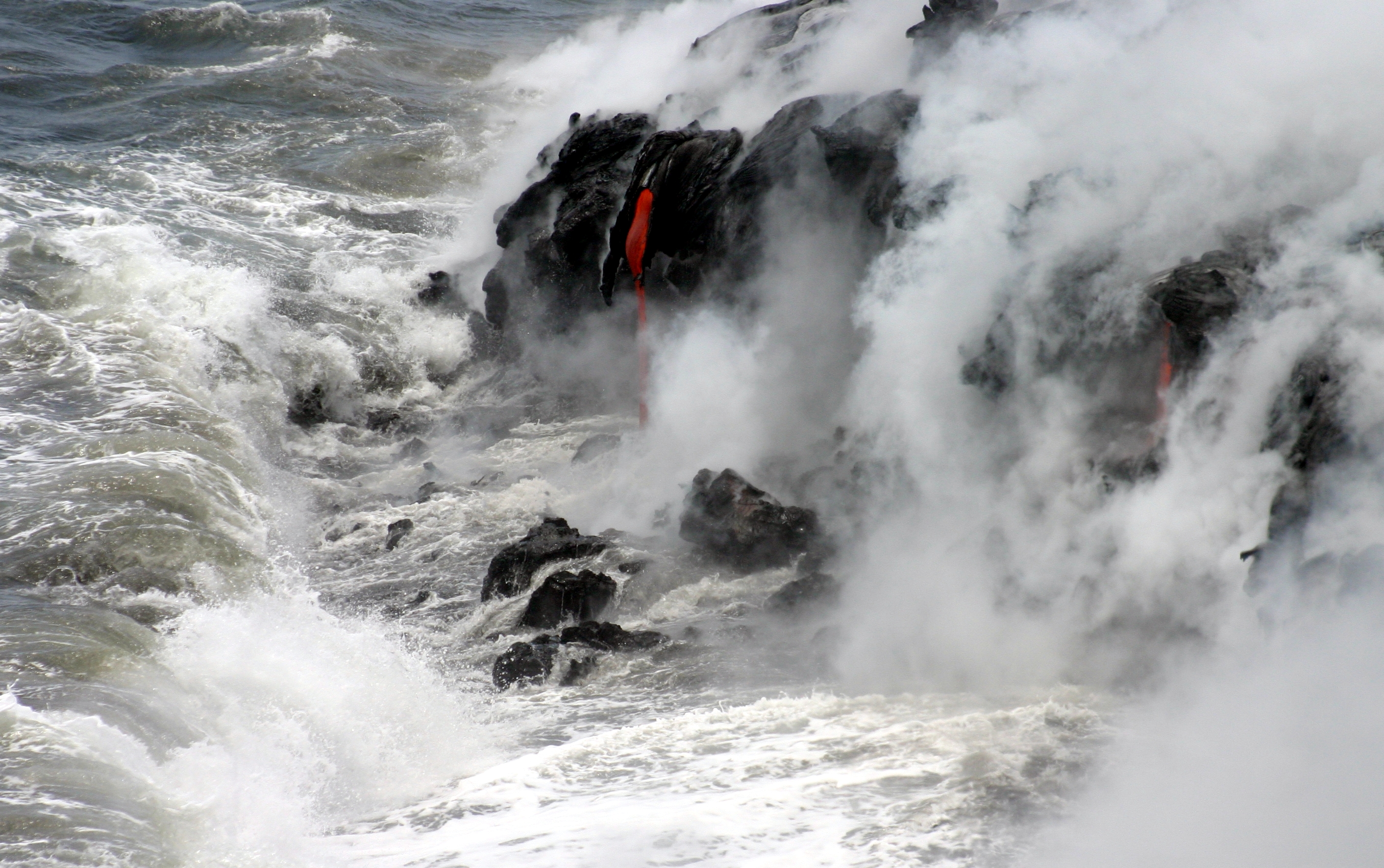
Laze plumes forming from pāhoehoe lava flowing into the Pacific Ocean, Hawaii

Laze is acid rain and air pollution arising from steam explosions and large plume clouds containing extremely acidic condensate (mainly hydrochloric acid), which occur when molten lava flows enter cold oceans. The term laze is a portmanteau of lava and haze.

Laze, created by the interaction of lava and cold seawater, differs from vog, which originates from volcanic vents.

The extremely high temperatures of lava flows 1,200 °C (2,200 °F) causes sea water to decompose into hydrogen and oxygen. The hydrogen combines with chloride ions dissolved in sea water, forming hydrogen chloride gas (hydrochloric acid). The rapidly rising plume of gas also carries with it fine particles of volcanic glass. The hydrochloric acid and other contaminants can precipitate out rapidly and the plume may become relatively safe a few hundred meters away; however, laze plumes have killed people who come in contact with them. The USGS has reported that, in 2000, two people were killed by exposure to laze clouds.
