= Garafía =

- Municipality
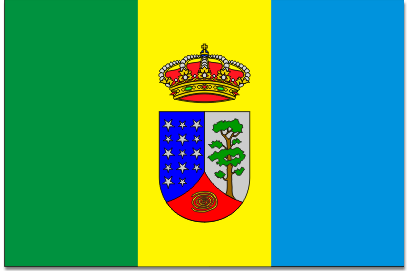
- Flag Coat of arms

- Location in Canary Islands
- Coordinates: 28°49′N 17°55′W
- Country: Spain
- Autonomous community: Canary Islands
- Province: Santa Cruz de Tenerife
- Island: La Palma

Area
  - Total: 103.00 km^{2} (39.77 sq mi)
- Elevation: 400 m (1,300 ft)

Population (2025-01-01)
  - Total: 2,015
  - Density: 19.56/km^{2} (50.67/sq mi)

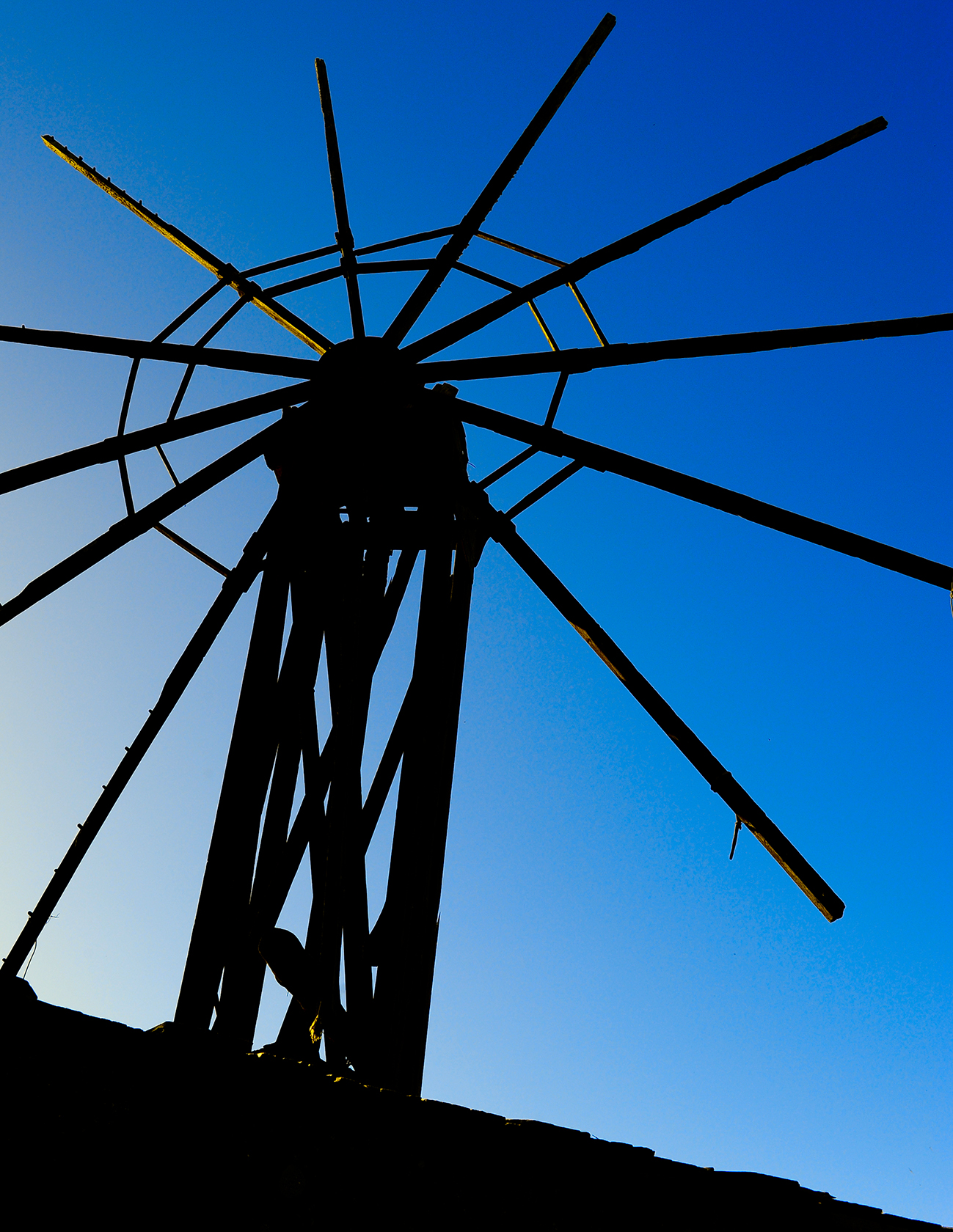
Windmill of Llano Negro (Garafía)

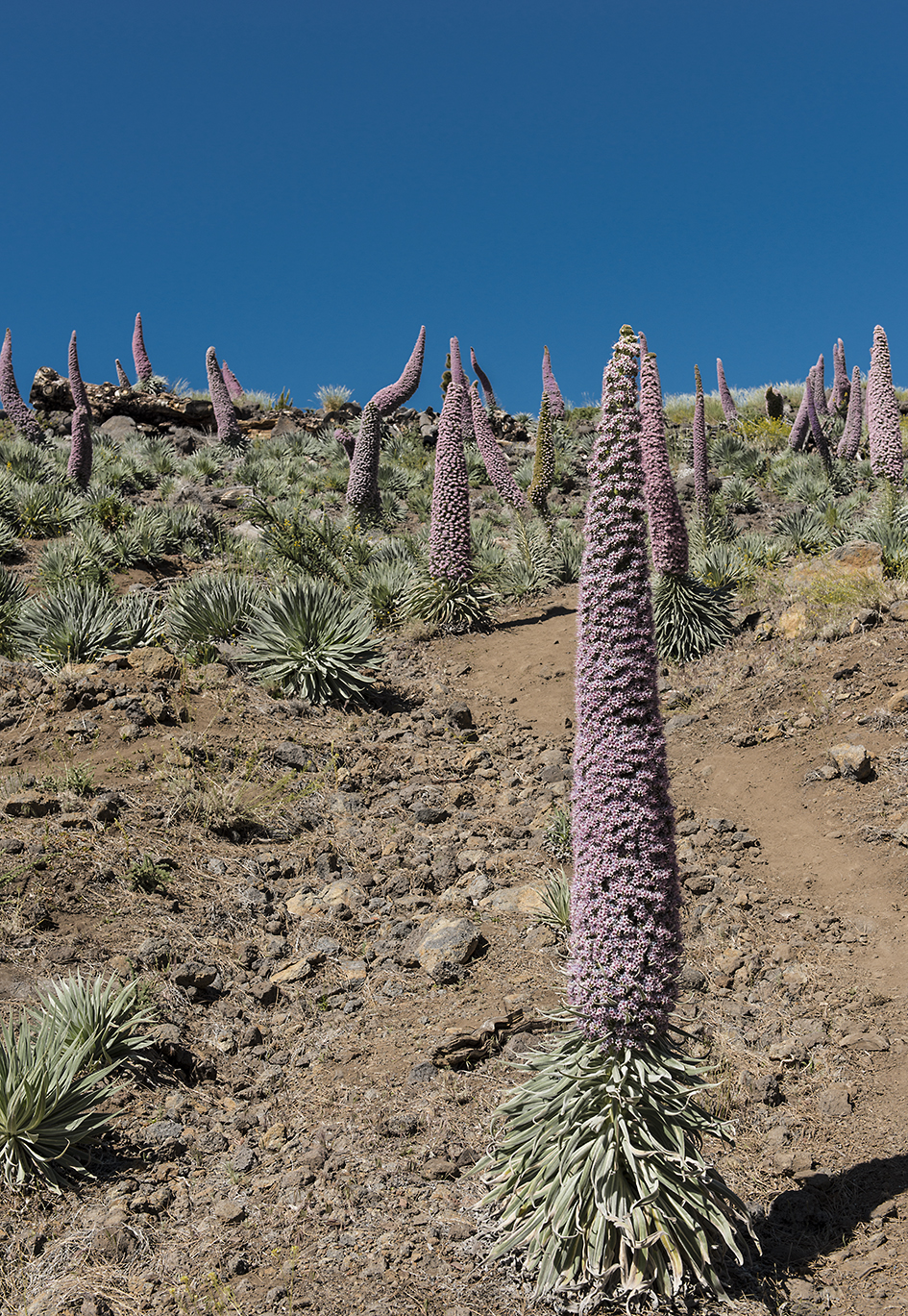
Tajinaste Rosa in bloom, in the way to El Roque de los Muchachos, Garafía, La Palma.

Garafía is a municipality in the island of La Palma, Santa Cruz de Tenerife (Canary Islands). Located in the northwest of the island, in the middle of two whims of nature: the ravines of Franceses (by the North) bordering Barlovento and Izcagua by the South (born at the foot of the Roque de los Muchachos), bordering Punta Gorda. The administrative capital, home to the City Council, is called Santo Domingo; its parish church, Iglesia de Nuestra Señora de La Luz dates back to the 16th century. Garafía has a length of 25.50 km coastline.

It covers an area of 103 square kilometers being the second largest municipality of the island of La Palma with an estimated population of 1,654 inhabitants (National Institute of Statistics, January 2012). Its administrative capital, Santo Domingo, where resides the City, is located at an altitude of 400 meters.

The climate in the coastal zone is smooth, with many windy days motivated by the impact of the trade winds in the area, most of the time being its very choppy sea. In the area of middle altitude called medianías, part of the territory in between 400 and 1200 meters over the sea level, very extensive, the temperature is colder, and is a place where the land is very rich. At this altitude is seen in the cool nights of Roque del Faro, Hoya Grande or Llano Negro, milder climate south on Catela, El Castillo or Las Tricias. This brings, along with the goodness of their land, agriculture rich and varied at this zone, the main crops cereals, fruits and tubers, and there are large areas of fresh and varied pastures that serve as gathering forage for raising animals, mostly his cabin goats, whose milk pemit obtain a tender cheese artisan deserved reputation for the golden color of its bark and its taste, resulting from treatment careful in smoked thereof, carried out by master craftsmen obtained area. At the summit path of Roque de los Muchachos and Los Andenes, in the same edge of the Caldera de Taburiente, with extremely cold climate, where it can snow Acclimatization include violet flower of Garafía at this extreme weather and blue and rose tajinastes blooming in the margins of the road to the top of the mountain.

In its municipal term is the Roque de los Muchachos, the highest point of the island with 2,426 meters over the sea level, where is located the headquarters of the telescopies the Canary Island Astrophysics Institute (IAC) on the island of La Palma, which together with this Institute has facilities in Tenerife (Izaña) make up the network ENO (European Northern Observatory, composed of over sixty scientific organizations in nineteen states), while its administrative base remains in La Laguna, Tenerife. The Roque de los Muchachos, on the edge of La Caldera de Taburiente, given its unique location, bathed by trade winds from the Atlantic, laminar, non-turbulent cold air, make it one of the prime locations in the northern hemisphere for astronomical observation.

This town, which in 1960 had a population of almost 5,000 inhabitants, has strongly suffered the phenomenon of emigration, since in 2012 the population was only 1,700 inhabitants, according to the INE (National Institute of Statistics, January 2012). Located on the steepest part of the island of La Palma, the development of communications came very late, still the road to Las Mimbreras the milestone causing its gradual depopulation and abandonment.

It should be borne in mind that in its 103 km², all three together Natural Monument Coast Hiscaguán, the Special Guelguén Natural Reserve and the Integral Natural reserve of Pinar de Garafía, are in total almost one third of the entire surface of the municipality. This reflects the local communities respect to nature. This includes the 1988 Protection Act Astronomical Observatories Quality Institute of Astrophysics of the Canary Islands.

The municipality consists of the districts of Llano Negro, Cueva de Agua, Don Pedro, Franceses, Santo Domingo, Hoya Grande, Juan Adalid-El Mudo, Catela, El Palmar, Roque del Faro, El Tablado, Las Tricias, El Castillo and La Mata.

== Land cover ==
The higher parts of Garafía are covered in pine trees with just a small treeless area above the tree line. The central areas around the villages are mostly farmland or rough natural landscape including almond trees and vineyards. The coastline is rough with steep cliffs and gorges and can be accessed at several points.

== The villages ==
Traditionally, the villages have been noted for their lack of geographical communication and their isolated remoteness. Until the 1960s the villages were largely isolated from the rest of the island and only accessible by donkey paths. Since then roads have been built and the area is easily accessible on good, but twisty, asphalted roads. As with many rural areas the population is in decline as small-scale agriculture and traditional rural life does not provide the income to encourage young people to stay.

== Population ==
Year	Population
1991	2,013
1996	2,002
2001	1,795
2002	2,002
2003	1,998
2004	1,948
2009	1,804
2013	1,645

== Tourism ==
It is an area recommended for walking and hiking with its paths for walking, and scenery. The steep forested hillside are dissected by barrancos (gorges).

== Gallery ==
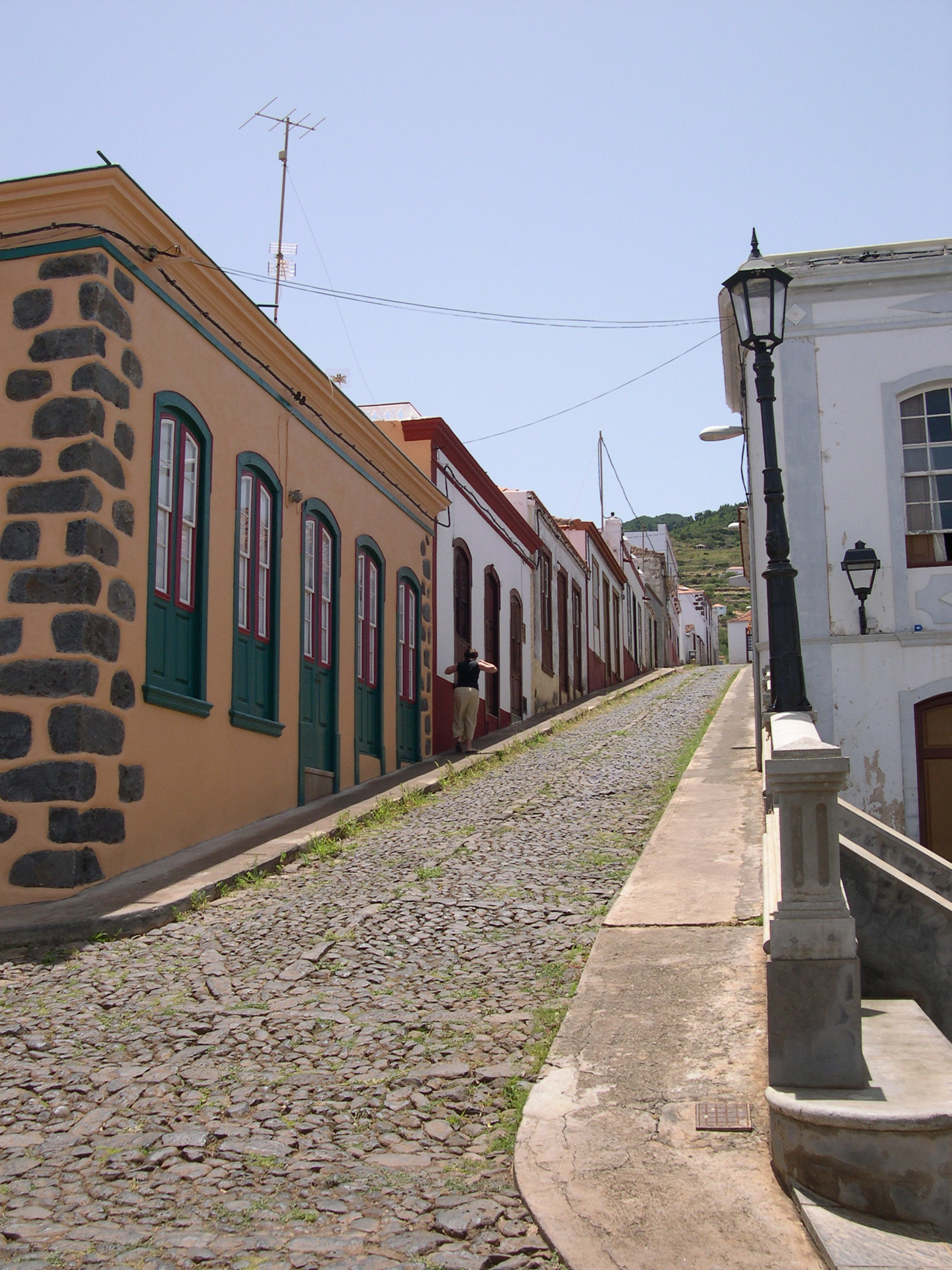
Santo Domingo - seat of Garafía

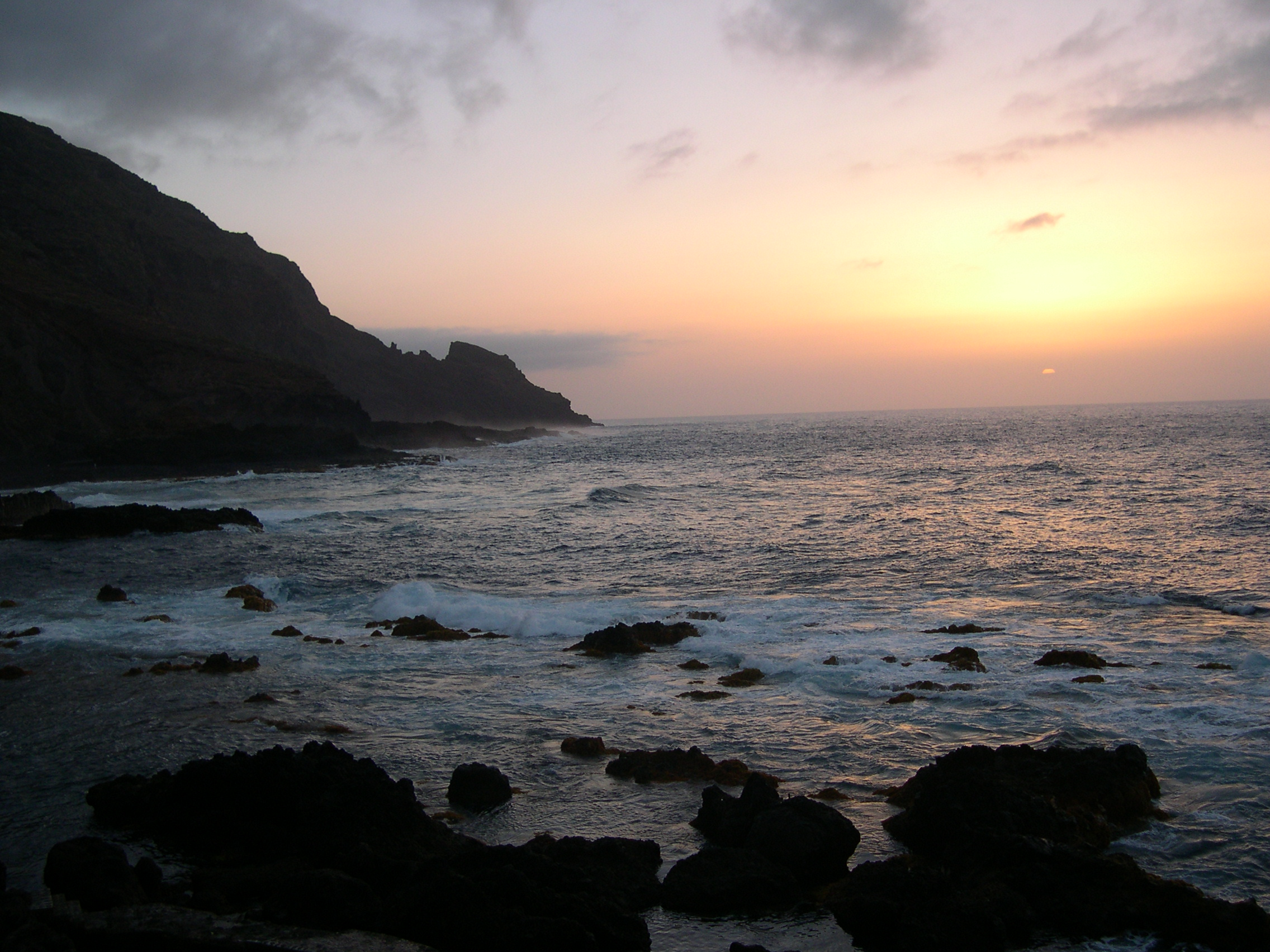
Hiscaguán, the north coast of La Palma

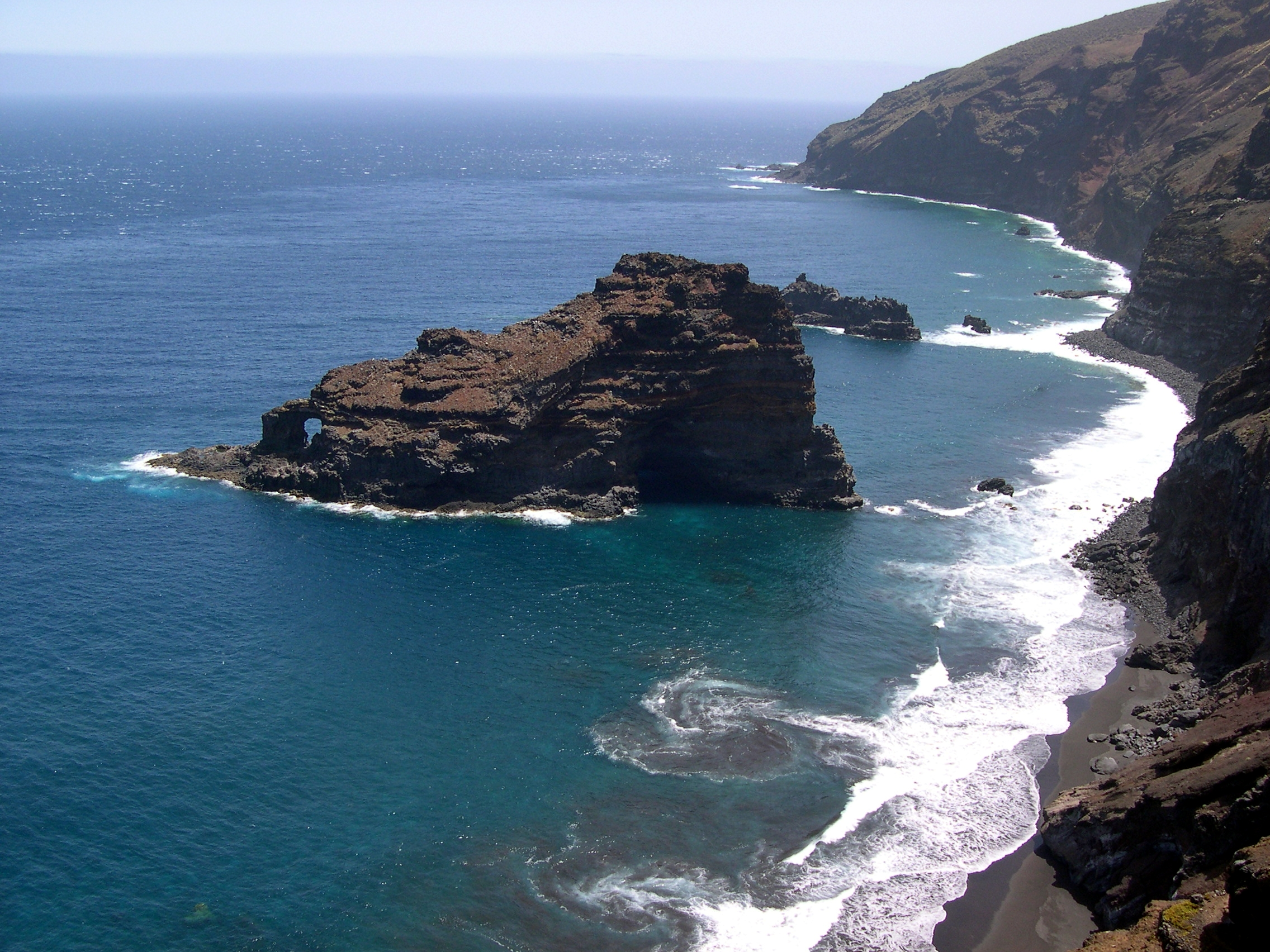
Hiscaguán, the north coast of La Palma. where you can see Bujaren Beach.

== See also ==
- List of municipalities in Santa Cruz de Tenerife
