= Cueva del Agua, Garafia =

Cueva del Agua
- Municipality district
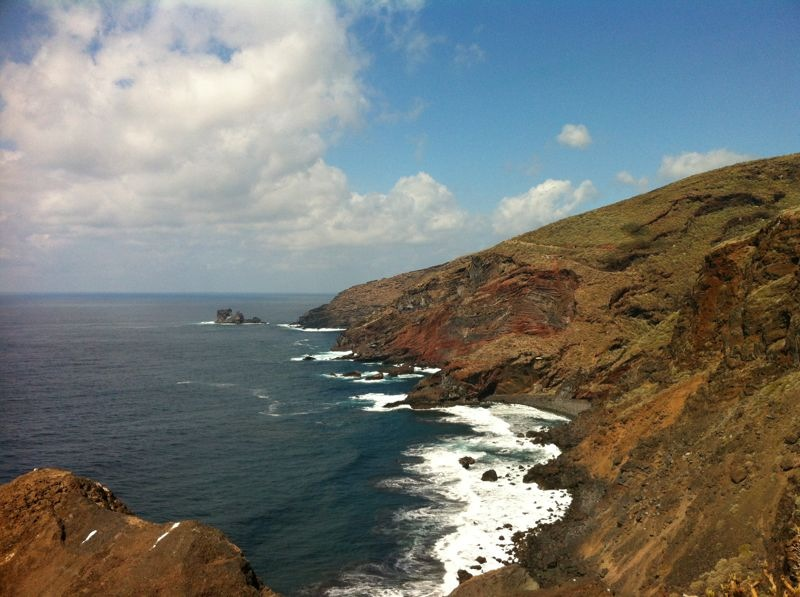
- La Palma, N-W: cliffs of Garafía's municipality and the Callejoncito beach

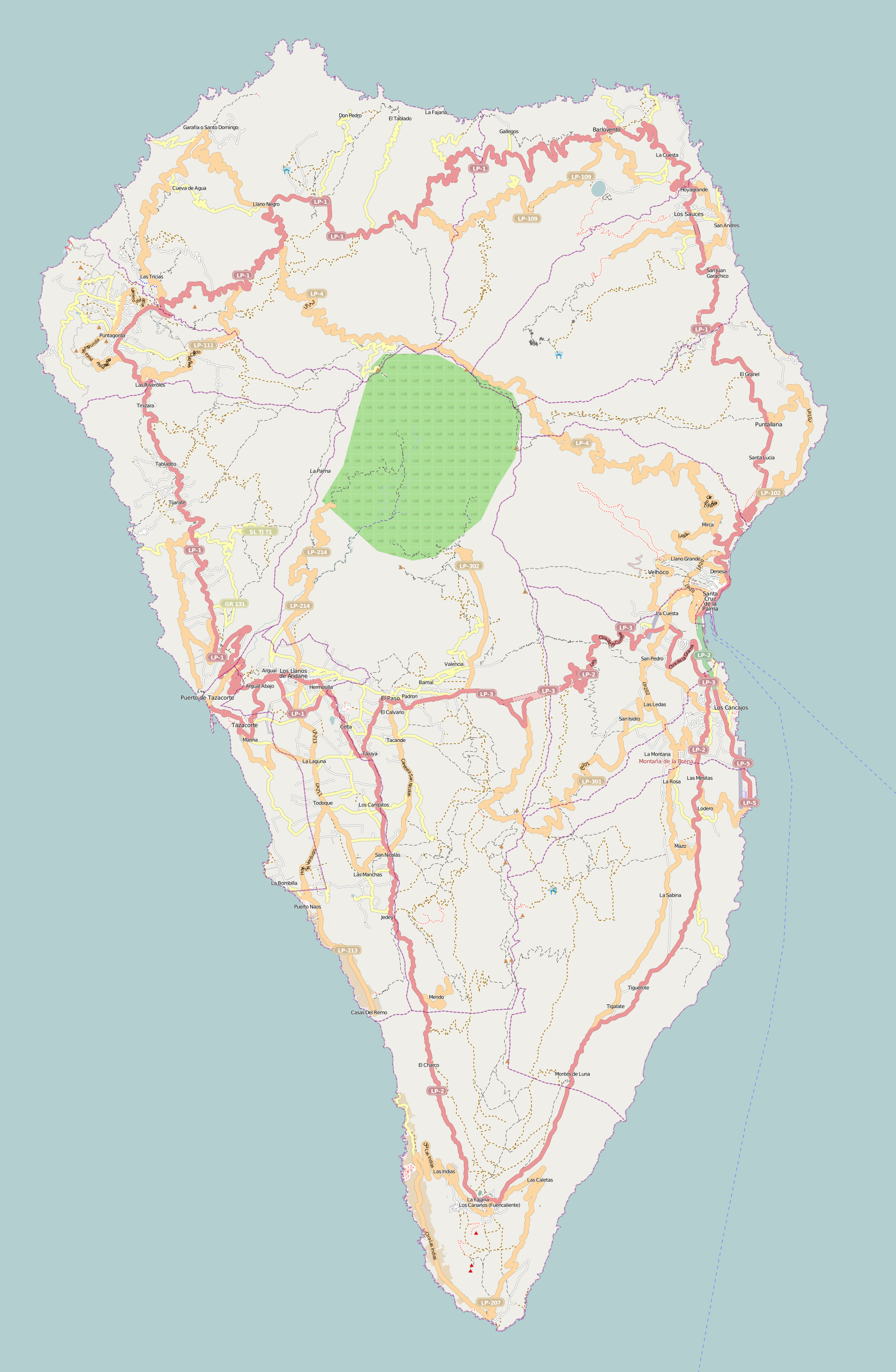
- Location of Cueva del Agua on La Palma island

- Location in Canary Islands
- Coordinates: 28°48′41.04″N 17°57′14.2992″W
- Country: Spain
- Autonomous community: Canary Islands
- Province: Santa Cruz de Tenerife
- Island: La Palma
- Municipality: Garafía

Cueva del Agua is a small village of the Spanish municipality of Garafia in the north-east of the island of La Palma, province of Santa Cruz de Tenerife, in the Canary Islands off the Moroccan coast.

== Location, description ==
On the island of La Palma, Cueva del Agua is a village 1.5 km east of the LP-114 road that links Santo Domingo (3 km north) to Las Tricias (9 km south, near Fagundo and the Pino de la Virgen). It stands between the districts of El Castillo village to the south and the town of Santo Domingo to the north. The north-west coast of the island is 1,600 m away (on a straight line).

The district is of mountainous type: small roads with sharp turns and deep narrow valleys, with the Atajo river and its steep ravine (barranco de Atajo) to the south of the village, and to the north that of the (barranco de Fernando Oporto or barranco Oropesa, also called barranco de los Hombres).

At its heart one finds the Chapel of Our Lady of Sorrows and the old school.

== Name of the district ==
The name of the village (Cueva del Agua or Cueva de Agua, in English "Cave of Water") comes from the existence of a natural cave inside which flows a spring. This cave, called the Spring cave (cueva de la Fuente), is found nearby the GR 130

== Population ==
Its population has fallen considerably since the 1950s and currently counts about 120 inhabitants.

== History and archaeology ==
=== Chapel of Our Lady of Sorrows ===
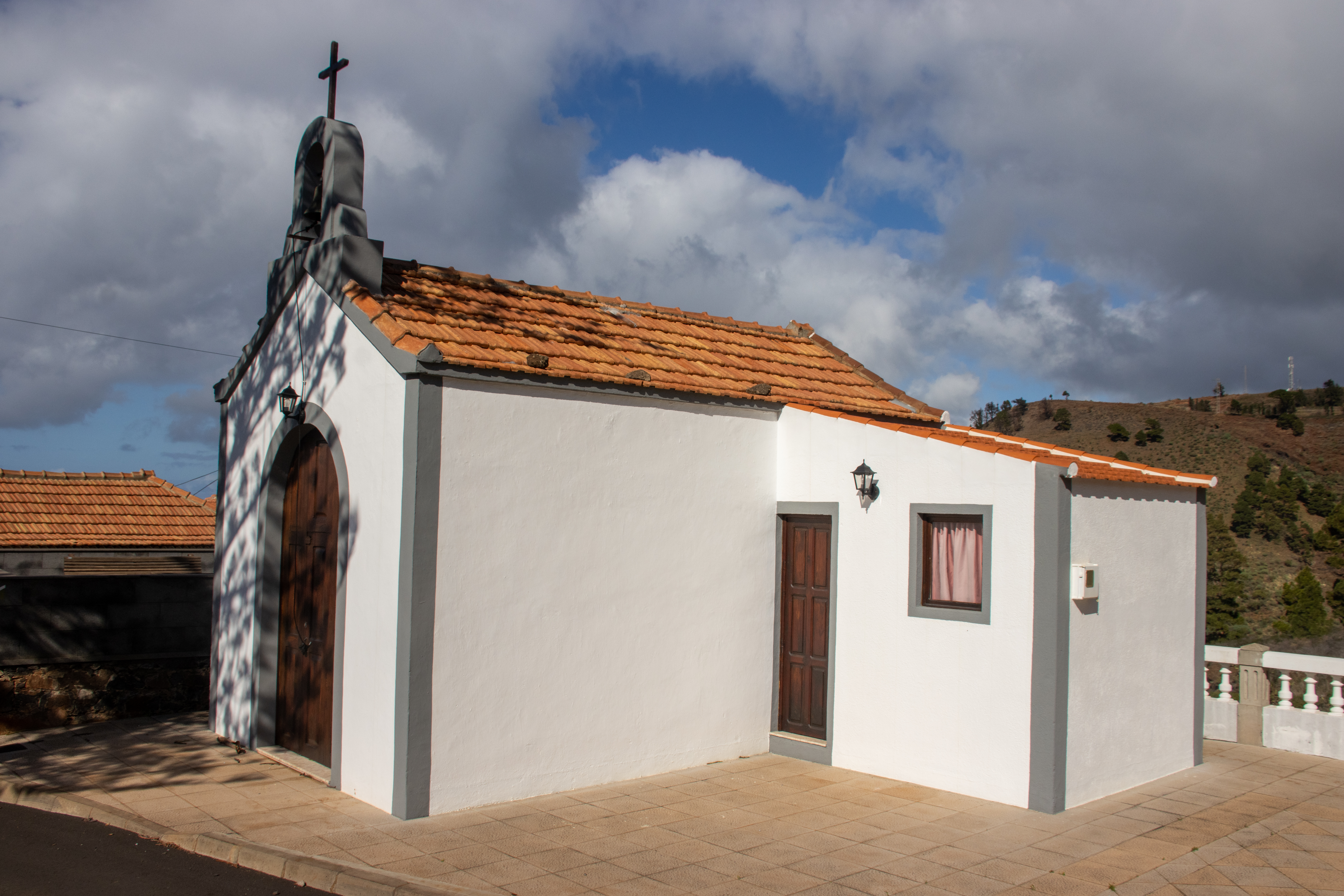
The chapel

It is a small building of only one vessel and a gable roof covered with curved ceramic tiles. The facade includes a triangular pediment, crowned with a bell wall and a cross above it. The access door is made out of Canarian pine wood and its top is arch-shaped.

==== Lady of Sorrows ====
It is a devotional image with eyes made out of crystal. It differs from the usual representations of the Virgin Mary generally encountered in the Canaries. But as everywhere else in the nation, from the 16th century a grandeur was given to the particular type of Lady of the Seven Sorrows, where Mary remains alone after the crucifixion of her Son and handed over to pain.

=== Archaeological remains of El Callejoncito ===
This site of cave engravings is on a rocky outcrop located on the top shore of the right bank of the ravine of the Atajo. Le site includes six panels in their original position. The patterns are geometric and put the accent on spirals, fretwork and meanders. They were made by punching the stone, making marks of variable widths and lengths. Its state of conservation is worsening due to the wear by erosive agents. These were made public in 1970 by Dr. Mauro Hernández Perez in his dissertation. Later they were studied during the Second phase (1988) of the Corpus of Cave Engravings of La Palma.

The site stands nearby an old settlement of prehistoric origin. The troglodyte village occupies the middle area of the right bank of the ravine of Atajo (barranco del Atajo). In general, the caves present good conditions for habitability in regard of their size, brightness, exposure and protection against inclement weather. The caves have been intensely used in the historical epoch and some of them have been pillaged.

Fragments of ceramics were found in this archaeological site, that belonged to jars from phases III and IV. The lithic technology is includes stone chips, dikes, cores, a.s.o., of grey basalt and glassy basalt. Ovine and caprine bony fragments have also been crushed as well as numerous limpet shells.

Petroglyphs are quite common on the territory of Cueva del Agua, and indeed on that of Garafia. Many have disappeared, notably during the construction of the roads, but a number of petroglyphs remain scattered. For example, near Cueva del Agua's windmill, at a place called The Calvary (El Calvario) are 17 engraved panels; their dominant motive is based on circles and spirals. This locally well-known place with easy access is often visited. Another petroglyph was found in 1997 among the stones used to build a wall.

=== El Callejoncito beach ===
At the mouth of the Atajo river is a small beach of black sand framed by tall cliffs, stretching over about 100 m. It is made of black volcanic sand dragged by the tides. A quiet beach in the winter months, it is a zone with great currents and precautions are strongly recommended for bathing.

It is reached from the LP-114 road at km 9 (starting from the south end of the LP-114, where it reaches the LP-1 near Las Tricias and Fagundo). The lane is tarmacked up to the parking place for the vehicles. From that point onward, there is a walk of approximately 1 km up to the beach.

=== Spring Cave ===
This cave, called Cueva de la Fuente in Spanish, is on the north face of the ravine that opens into Callejoncito. Its mouth is under a rocky arch. It is a large cave, used a park for goats - and therefore fenced in. There are some cement- and brickworks in connection with the spring. The cave, of volcanic origin, runs parallel to the coastline - and not perpendicularly to it.

== Feasts ==
The village's feast is celebrated in September, dedicated to the patron saint of Cueva de Agua, Our Lady of Sorrows. A popular street party and various cultural acts are carried out.

== See also ==
=== Bibliography ===
- García, Francisco José Herrera (2005). Grabados en la memoria: catálogo de estaciones rupestres ya desaparecidas en el antiguo bando de Tagalguen (Garafia) ("Engraved in memory: list of rupestrian art already disappeared from the old region of Tagalguen (Garafia)") (PDF). Revista de Estudios Generales de la Isla de La Palma, pp. 255-273. ISSN 1698-014X.

=== External links ===
- Cueva del Agua, some photos on islalapalma.com
- Cueva del Agua on garafia.es, site of the municipality of Garafia
