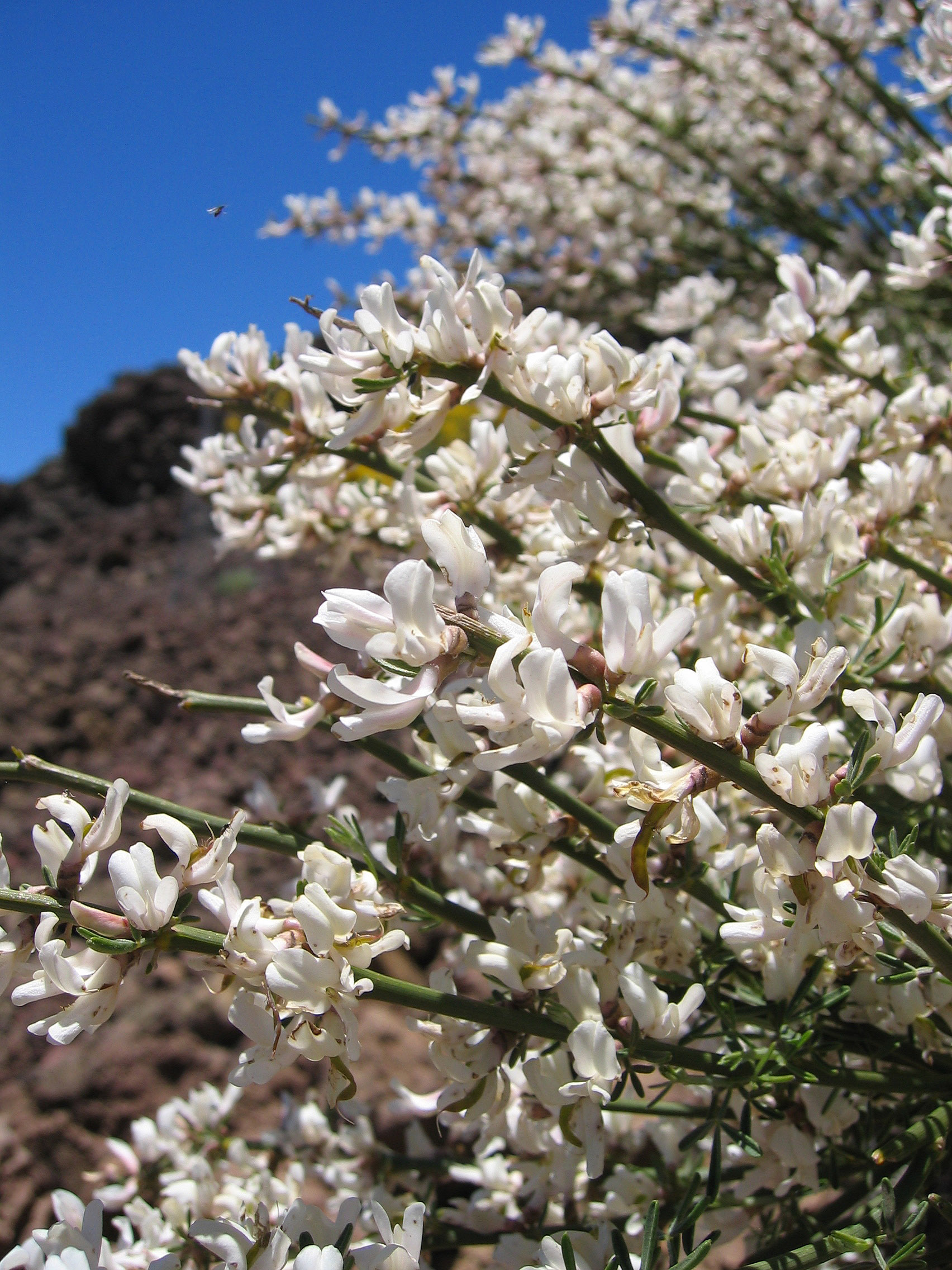
- Cytisus supranubius at Roque de los Muchachos, La Palma, Canary Islands, Spain

Conservation status
- Least Concern (IUCN 3.1)

Scientific classification
- Kingdom: Plantae
- Clade: Tracheophytes
- Clade: Angiosperms
- Clade: Eudicots
- Clade: Rosids
- Order: Fabales
- Family: Fabaceae
- Subfamily: Faboideae
- Genus: Cytisus
- Species: C. supranubius

Binomial name
- Cytisus supranubius (L.f.) Christ ex G. Kunkel

Synonyms
- Spartocytisus supranubius (L.f.) Kuntze; Spartium supranubium (L.f.)

= Cytisus supranubius =

White-flowered broom

Species of flowering plant

Cytisus supranubius (also known as white-flowered broom or retama del Teide) is a species of broom endemic to the Canary Islands. This species is found at about 2000m altitude on Tenerife in Las Cañadas del Teide and on mountain tops on La Palma.

== Etymology ==
The species name "supranubius" comes from the Latin "supra", which means "above" and "nubius", which means "clouds", referring to the fact that this species is found at high altitudes on the islands of Tenerife and La Palma, above the height of the so-called "sea of clouds".
