= Tanausu =

Historical Canary Islands ruler

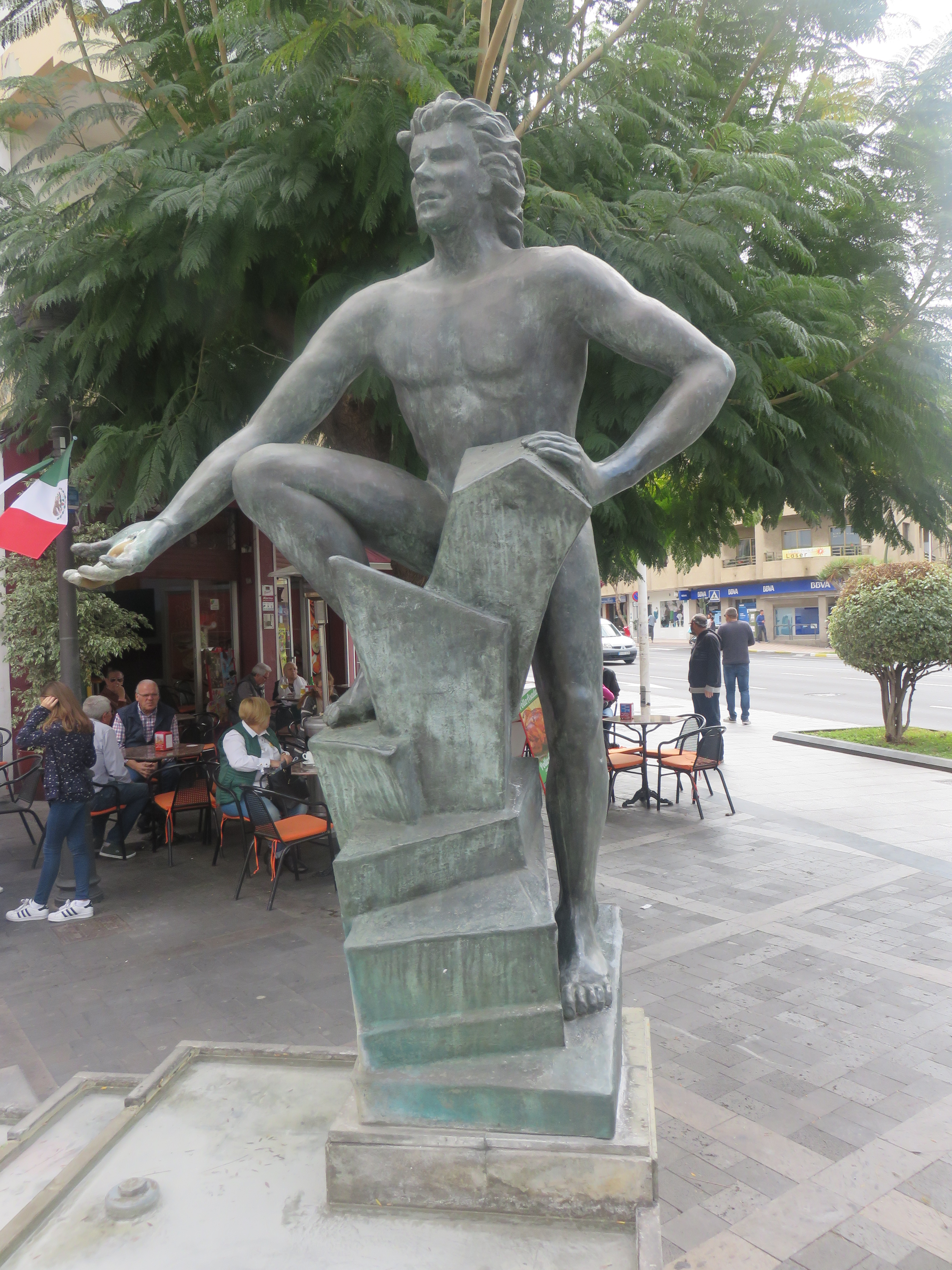
Statue of Tanausú by Manuel Pereda de Castro in Los Llanos de Aridane

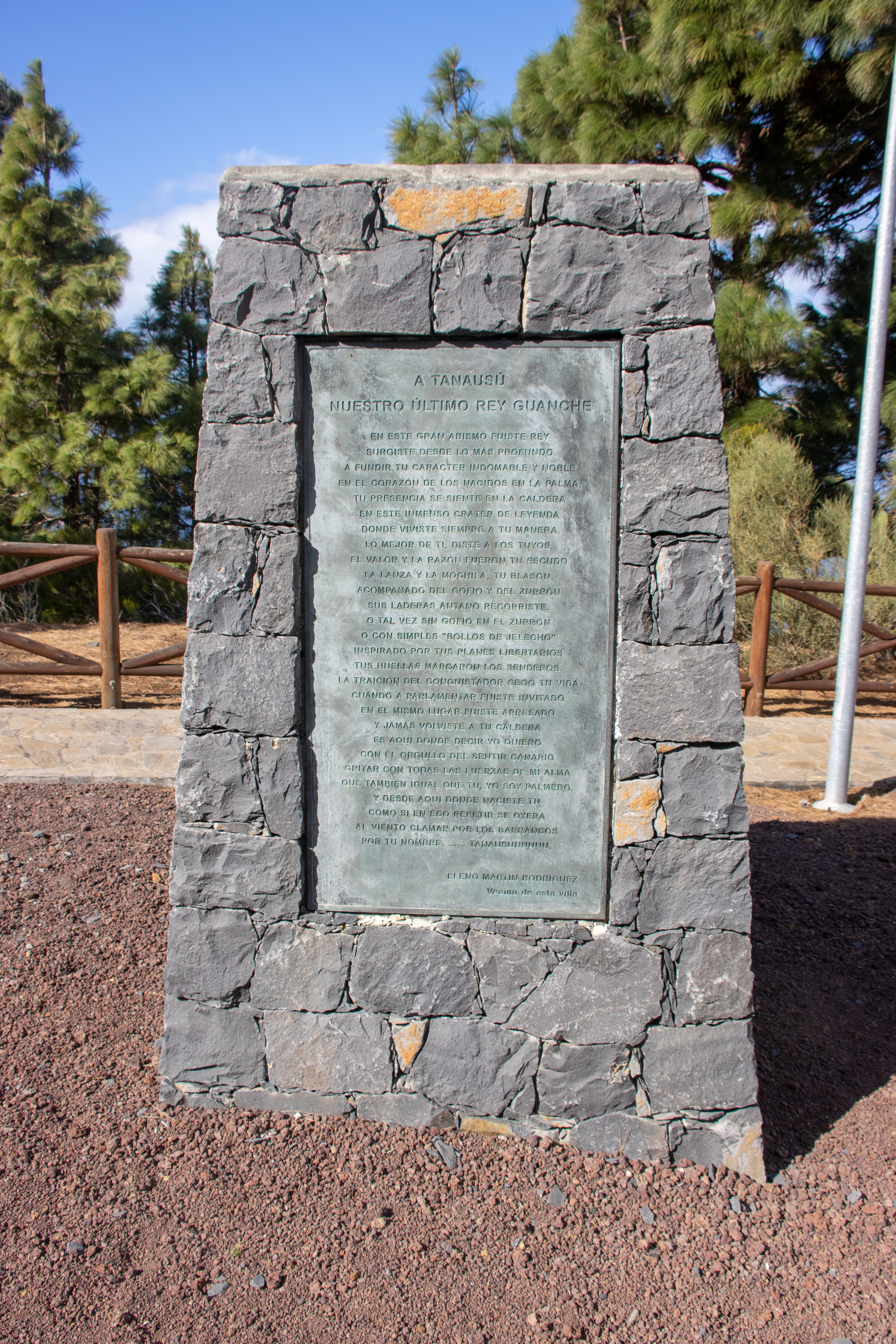
A plaque describing Tanausú at the Tanausú viewpoint in La Palma

Tanausu (also Tanausú and Atanausu) (died 1493) was the Guanche ruler of Aceró, on the island of La Palma (known to the original population as Benahoare), whose defeat by the Castilians marked the final conquest of that island. The island of Tenerife, conquered in 1495, was the last of the Canary Islands to fall under European control. His name has been translated as "The obstinate" or "He who has kidneys."

Aceró, whose name is said to mean "strong place" in Guanche, has been identified with the area now known as La Caldera de Taburiente, which indeed lends itself to a strong defense.

He was the last king of La Palma to submit himself to the Castilian forces led by Alonso Fernández de Lugo. The Castilians had failed twice in their attempts to penetrate the region known as La Caldera. A truce, with a promise of gifts and good treatment, was arranged by Fernández de Lugo through Juan de Palma, a relative of Tanausu who had converted to Christianity. The truce, to which Tanausu had agreed, led to the king's capture in an ambush. He was convinced to come out on the pass known as Adamacansis, and was ambushed on the spot now known as El Riachuelo, near present-day La Cumbrecita.

Tanausu was taken away to be presented to Ferdinand and Isabella. In defiance, Tanausu is said to have refused to eat during the voyage to Spain, and he died without seeing land again.

Harald Braem wrote a book called Tanausu, König der Guanchen ("Tanausu, King of the Guanches", available in German and Spanish, editorial Verena Zech, Tenerife 2005).
