= Benahoare =

Benahoare was the native Guanche name for the Spanish island of La Palma, one of the Canary Islands. Prior to its conquest by the Castilians, completed in 1493, the island had been divided into 12 cantons or lordships. The last Guanche lord to submit to European rule was Tanausu. There are varying opinions on the etymology of Benahoare. Previous interpretations suggested the name meant "my land" or "fatherland" in the native language, however there has been speculation that it is a reference to a tribe's name.

Benahoare today is a subdivision of Santa Cruz de la Palma which is named after the older native name.
