= La Palma =

Canary island

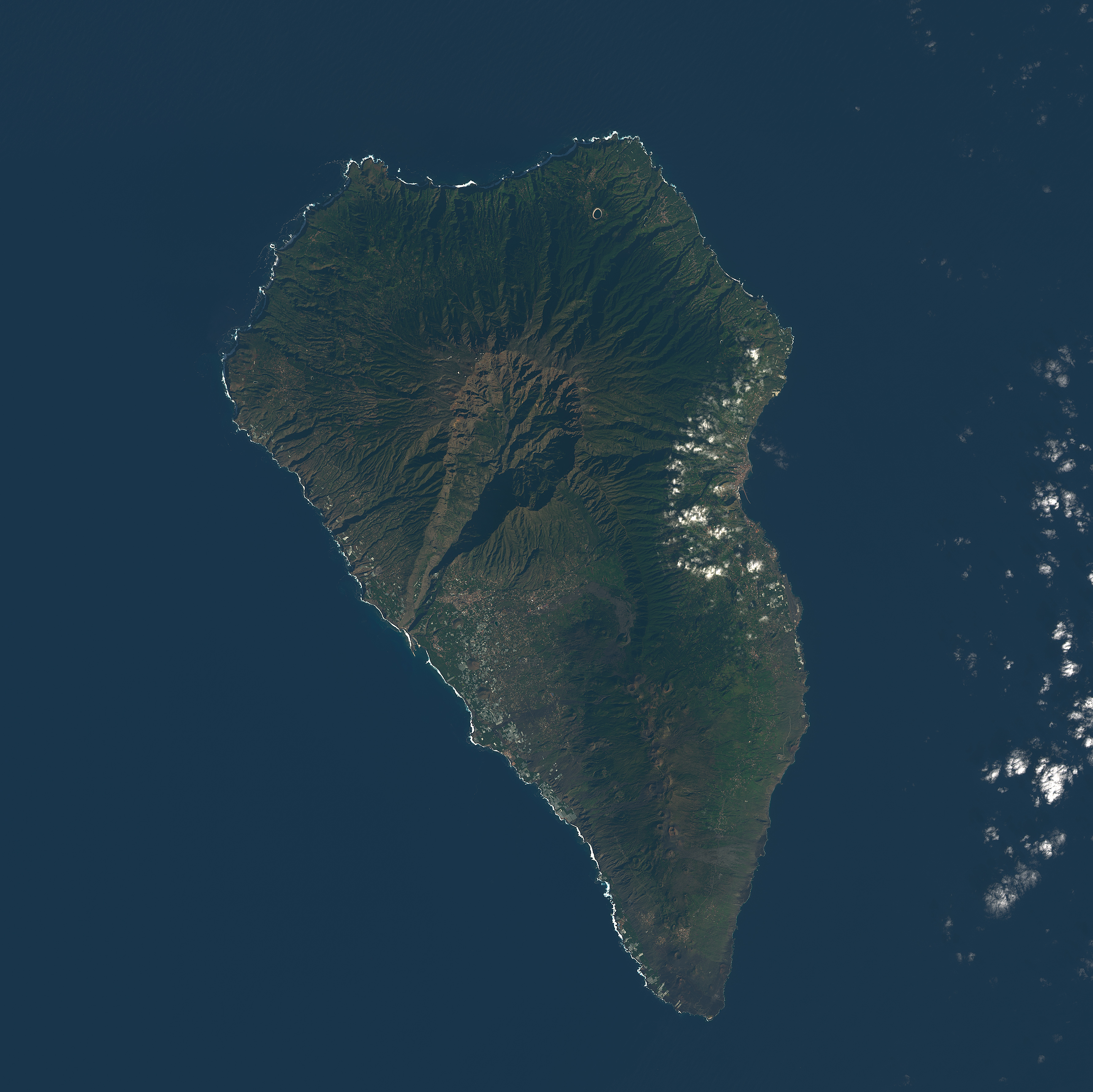
- Satellite view of La Palma

- Location of La Palma within the Canary Islands

- Location of La Palma relative to Africa

Geography
- Location: Atlantic Ocean
- Coordinates: 28.66°N 17.86°W
- Archipelago: Canary Islands
- Area: 708.32 km^{2} (273.48 sq mi)
- Coastline: 166 km (103.1 mi)
- Highest elevation: 2,426 m (7959 ft)
- Highest point: Roque de los Muchachos

Administration
- Spain
- Autonomous Community: Canary Islands
- Province: Santa Cruz de Tenerife
- Capital city: Santa Cruz de La Palma
- Largest settlement: Los Llanos de Aridane (pop. 20,375 (2023))

Demographics
- Demonym: palmero/a
- Population: 84,338 (start of 2023)
- Pop. density: 119.1/km^{2} (308.5/sq mi)
- Languages: Spanish, specifically Canarian Spanish
- Ethnic groups: Spanish, Canary Islanders, other minority groups

Additional information
- Time zone: WET (UTC±00:00)
  - Summer (DST): WEST (UTC+01:00)

La Palma (Spanish pronunciation: [la ˈpalma], locally [lɐ ˈpɑ(l)mɐ]), also known as La isla bonita (pronounced [la ˈisla βoˈnita], English: The Beautiful Island) and historically San Miguel de La Palma, is the most northwesterly island of the Canary Islands, a Spanish autonomous community and archipelago in Macaronesia in the North Atlantic Ocean. La Palma has an area of 708.32 square kilometres (273.48 sq mi) making it the fifth largest of the eight main Canary Islands. The total population at the start of 2023 was 84,338, of whom 15,522 lived in the capital, Santa Cruz de La Palma and 20,375 in Los Llanos de Aridane. Its highest mountain is the Roque de los Muchachos, at 2,426 metres (7,959 ft), being second among the peaks of the Canaries after the Teide massif on Tenerife.

In 1815, the German geologist Leopold von Buch visited the Canary Islands. It was as a result of his visit to Tenerife, where he visited the Las Cañadas caldera, and then later to La Palma, where he visited the Taburiente caldera, that the Spanish word for cauldron or large cooking pot – "caldera" – was introduced into the geological vocabulary. In the center of the island is the Caldera de Taburiente National Park, one of four national parks in the Canary Islands.

== Etymology ==
The full name of the island is "San Miguel de La Palma" ("Saint Michael of La Palma"), usually abbreviated simply to "La Palma". La Palma is nicknamed "La Isla Bonita" ("beautiful island").

== Origins and geology ==
La Palma, like the other islands of the Canary Islands archipelago, is a volcanic ocean island. The volcano rises almost 7 km (4 mi) above the floor of the Atlantic Ocean. There is road access from sea level to the summit at 2,426 m (7,959 ft), which is marked by an outcrop of rocks called Roque de Los Muchachos ("Rock of the Young Men"). This is the site of the Roque de los Muchachos Observatory, one of the world's premier astronomical observatories.

La Palma's geography is a result of the volcanic formation of the island. The highest peaks reach over 2,400 m (7,874 ft) above sea level, and the base of the island is located almost 4,000 m (13,123 ft) below sea level. The northern part of La Palma is dominated by the Caldera de Taburiente, with a width of 9 km (6 mi) and a depth of 1,500 m (4,921 ft). It is surrounded by a ring of mountains ranging from 1,600 m (5,249 ft) to 2,400 m (7,874 ft) in height. On its northern side is the exposed remains of the original seamount. Only the deep Barranco de las Angustias ("Ravine of Anxiety") ravine leads into the inner area of the caldera, which is a national park. It can be reached only by hiking. The outer slopes are cut by numerous gorges which run from 2,000 m (6,562 ft) down to the sea. Today, only a few of these carry water due to the many water tunnels that have been cut into the island's structure.

From the Caldera de Taburiente to the south runs the ridge Cumbre Nueva ('New Ridge', which despite its name is older than the Cumbre Vieja, 'Old Ridge.') The southern part of La Palma consists of the Cumbre Vieja, a volcanic ridge formed by numerous volcanic cones built of lava and scoria. The Cumbre Vieja ridge is active, last erupting in the 2021 La Palma eruption, which destroyed more than 2600 buildings and caused one death. Beyond Punta de Fuencaliente at the southern tip of the island, the Cumbre Vieja continues in a southerly direction as a submarine volcano.

== Volcanism and eruptions ==
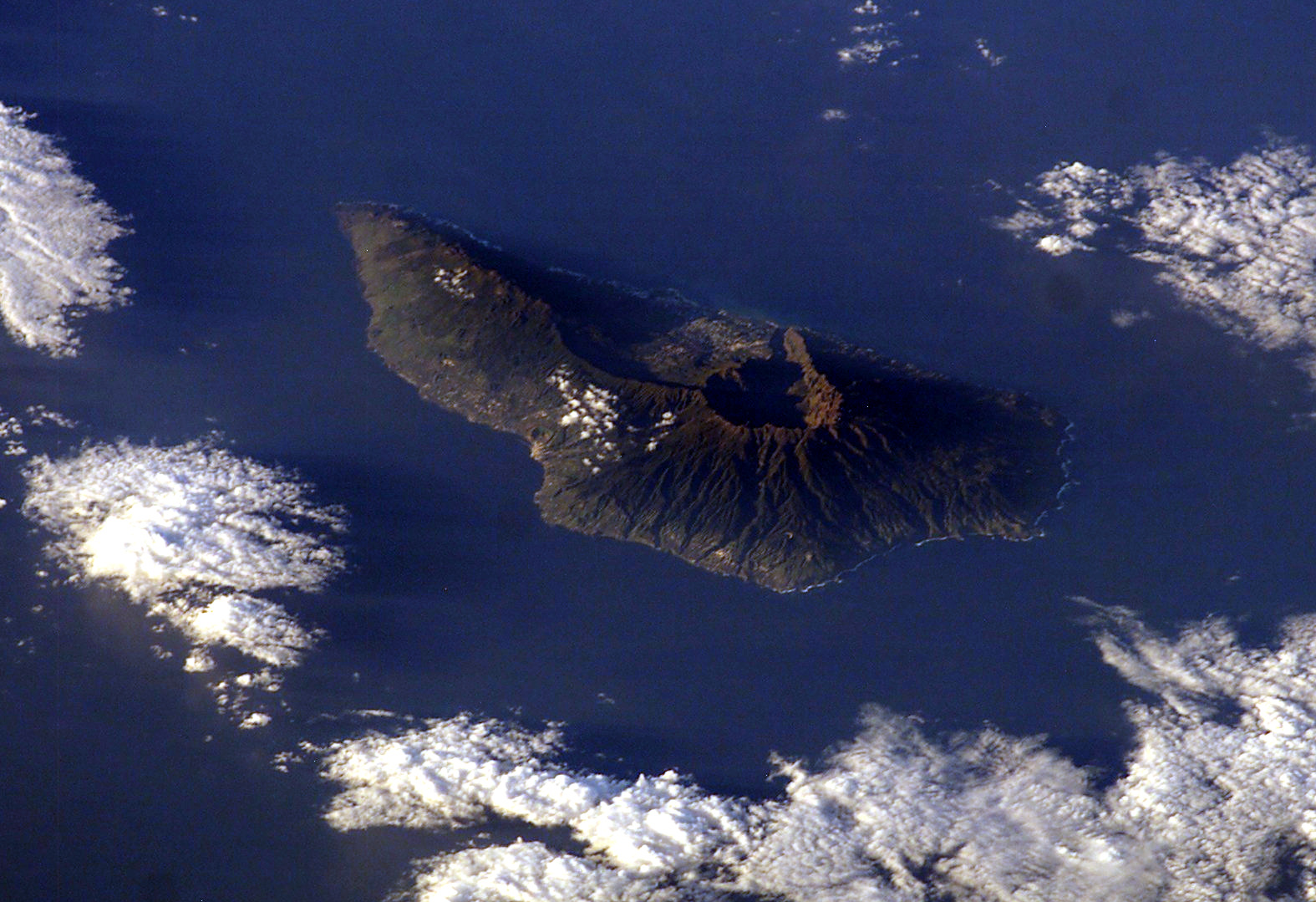
Satellite image of La Palma, with the Caldera de Taburiente visible (north is to the lower right)

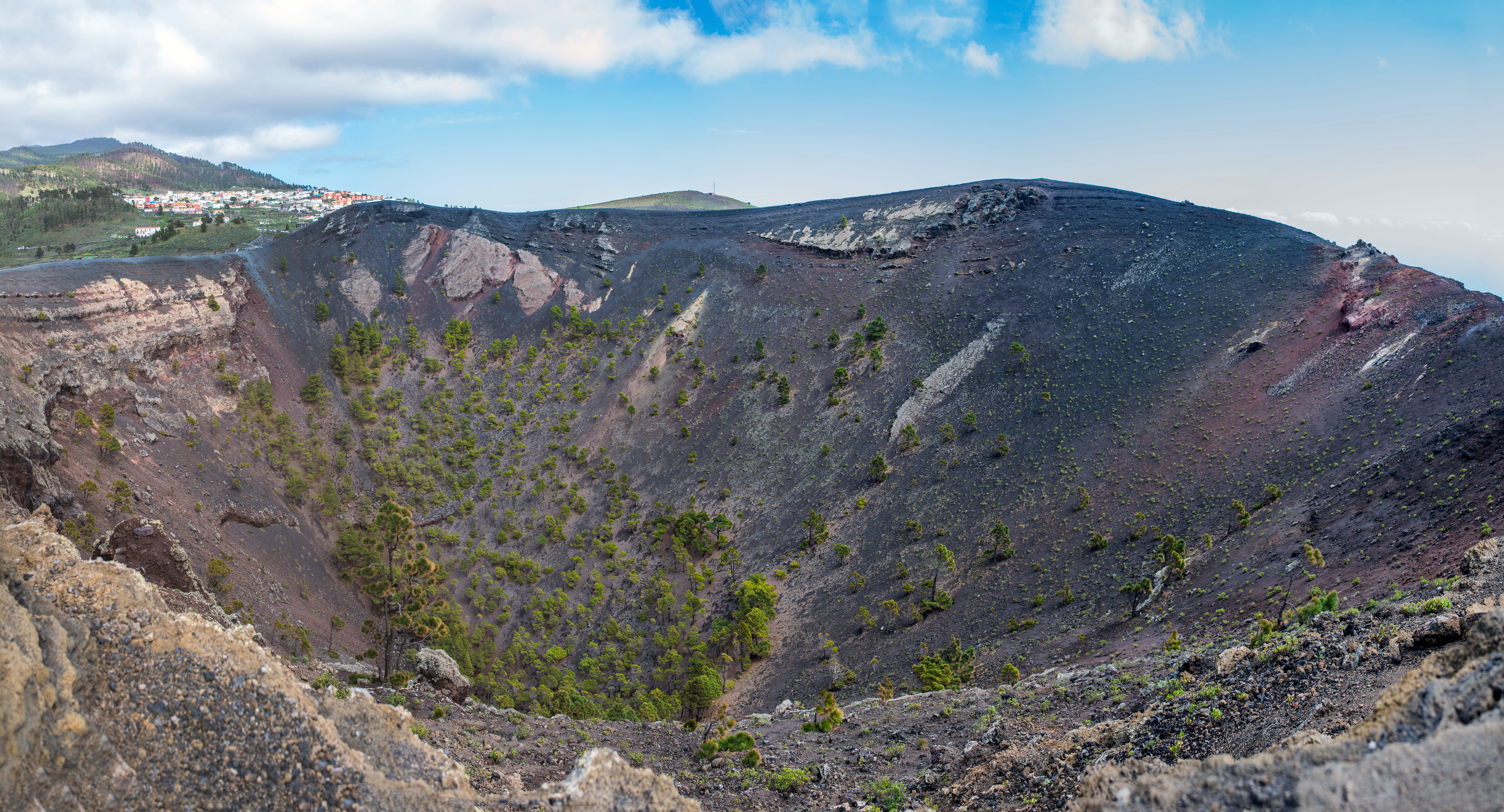
Crater of San Antonio volcano (last erupted 1677)

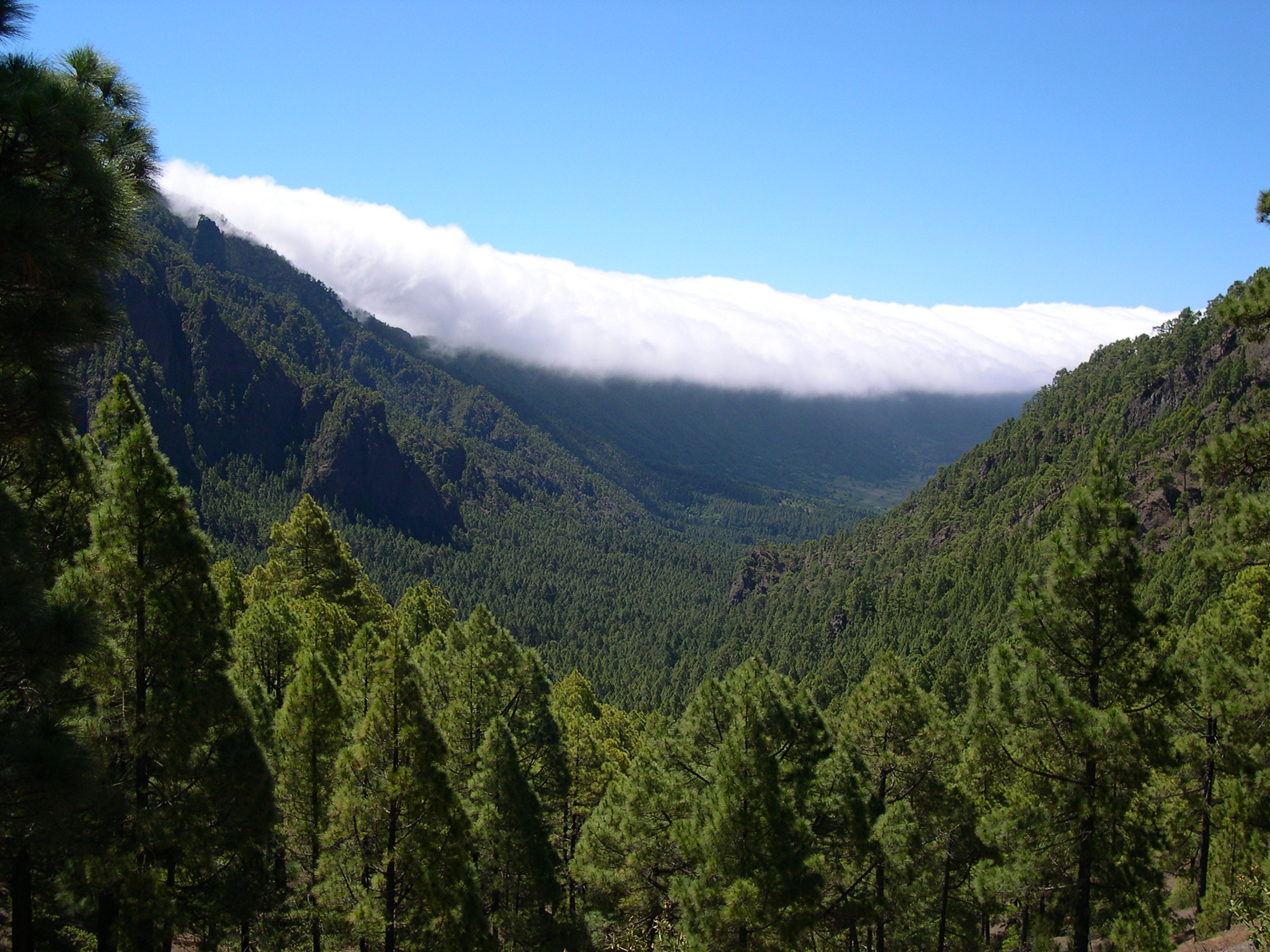
A view of the island looking south

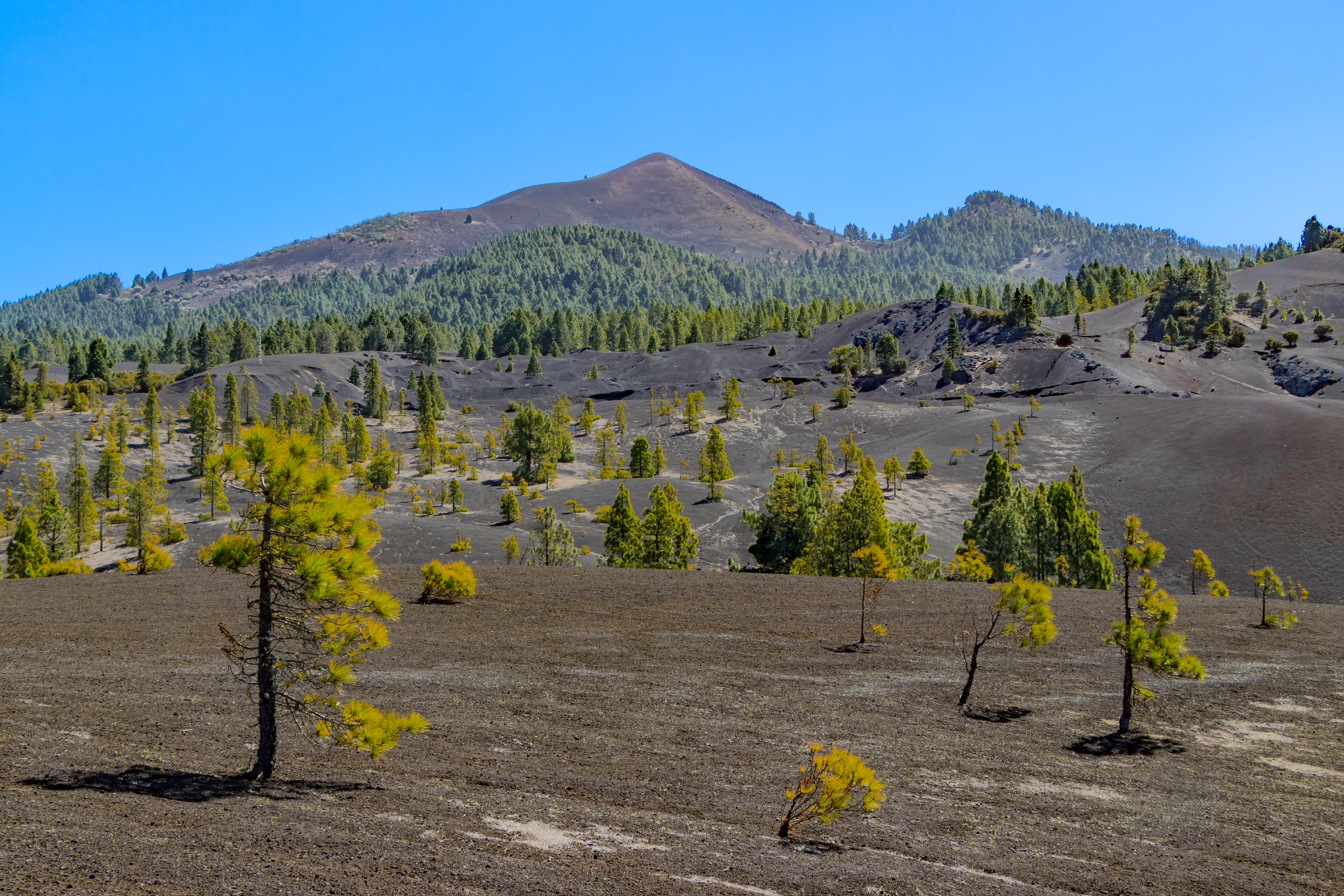
Pico Birigoyo is the northernmost of the high volcanic peaks along the Cumbre Vieja

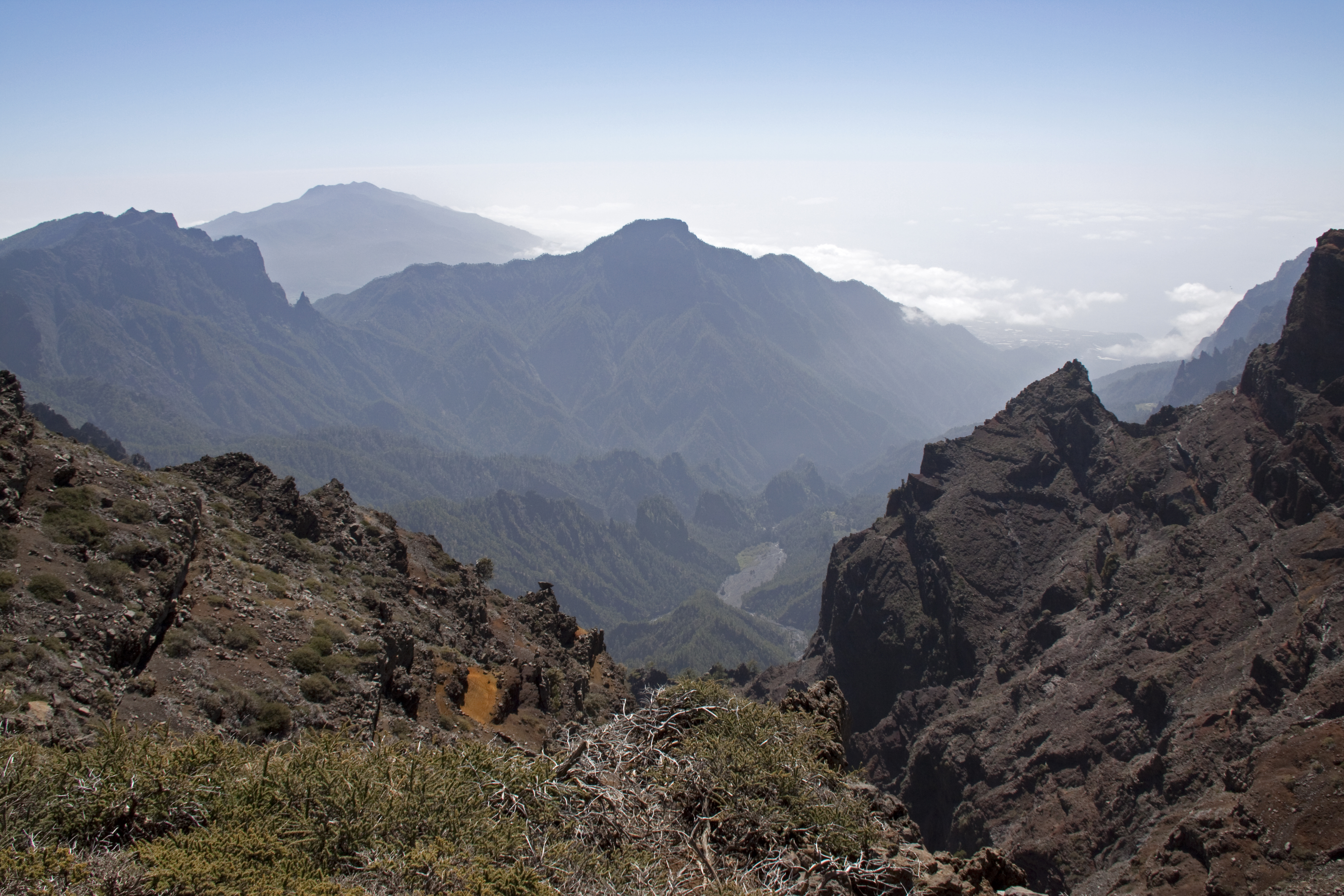
Walls of Caldera de Taburiente

Like all of the Canary Islands, La Palma originally formed as a seamount through submarine volcanic activity. Along with Tenerife, La Palma is the most volcanically active of the Canary Islands. Its base lies almost 4,000 m (13,123 ft) below sea level and reaches a height of 2,426 m (7,959 ft) above sea level. About a half a million years ago, the Taburiente volcano collapsed with a giant landslide, forming the Caldera de Taburiente. Erosion has since exposed part of the old seamount in the northern part of the caldera. Since the Spanish have kept records, there have been eight eruptions – all of which have occurred on the Cumbre Vieja volcanic ridge:

- 1470–1492 Montaña Quemada
- 1585 Tajuya
- 1646 Volcán Martín
- 1677 Volcán San Antonio
- 1712 El Charco
- 1949 Volcán San Juan: Duraznero, Hoyo Negro and Llano del Banco vents
- 1971 Volcán Teneguía
- 2021 Cumbre Vieja volcanic eruption

At Cumbre Vieja ridge a new monogenetic volcano burst on 19 September 2021 after several seismic crises that rocked the island, among other anomalies regarding volcanic surveillance. At 85 days, it is the longest known and the most damaging volcanic eruption on La Palma since records began. The total damage caused by the volcano amounts up to 843 million euros. A Special Commissioner for the Reconstruction of the island of La Palma was created in 2022, tasked with coordinating and promoting the actions adopted by the General State Administration to repair the damage caused by volcanic eruptions and for the reconstruction of the island. Hector Izquierdo Triana, born in La Palma and secretary of state for finance at that time, was appointed to this responsibility.

== Tsunami scenarios ==
In an episode of the BBC Horizon series broadcast on 12 October 2000, two geologists hypothesised that during a future eruption, the western flank of Cumbre Vieja, with a mass of approximately 1.5 × 10^{15} kg, could slide into the ocean. This could then generate a giant wave, known as a "megatsunami" around 650–900 m (2,130–2,950 ft) high. The wave could radiate out across the Atlantic and inundate much of the eastern seaboard of North America, and many of the islands in the Caribbean and northern coasts of South America between six and eight hours later. They estimate that such a tsunami could have waves possibly 50 m (164 ft) or higher causing massive devastation along the coastlines. Modelling suggests that the tsunami could inundate up to 25 km (16 mi) inland. The claim was also explored in a BBC docu-drama called End Day which went through several hypothetical scenarios of disastrous proportions. However, nowhere in their papers do the authors make any claim about the imminent collapse of the flank. Rather, they state that they have modelled the worst-case scenario.

In 2002 the Tsunami Society published a statement stating "... We would like to halt the scaremongering from these unfounded reports..." The major points raised in this report include:

- The claim that half of Cumbre Vieja dropped 4 m (13 ft) during the 1949 eruption is erroneous, and contradicted by physical evidence.
- No evidence was sought or shown that there is a fault line dividing the island of La Palma.
- Physical evidence shows a 4 km (2 mi) long line in the rock, but the models assumed a 25 km (16 mi) line, for which no physical evidence was given. Further, there is no evidence shown that the 4 km (2 mi) long line extends to beneath the surface.
- There has never been a megatsunami in the Atlantic Ocean in recorded history.

A geological survey published in 1999 concluded that the western flank is stable with no evidence of aseismic creep. Other experts agree that the fracture resulting from the 1949 eruption is a shallow and inactive surface expression that should be monitored, but consider the possibility that it is unstable as being almost nonexistent. Also, it is likely that the morphology of the floor of the Atlantic Ocean would hinder the propagation of a transoceanic tsunami. In 2006 Jan Nieuwenhuis of Delft University of Technology simulated several volcanic eruptions and calculated it would take another 10,000 years for the flanks to become sufficiently high and unstable to cause a massive collapse.

A 2008 paper looked into the worst-case scenario of a massive landslide and subsequent megatsunami. The authors concluded that waves could reach heights in the range 10 to 188 meters in the Canary Islands, but that the waves would dissipate as they radiated out into the Atlantic Ocean. They predict 40 meters height for some nearby island systems. For continents, the worst effects would be expected in Northern Brazil (13.6 m), French Guiana (12.7 m), mid-US (9.6 m), Western Sahara (largest prediction at 37 meters) and Mauritania (9.7 m). While still large, this would not qualify as a megatsunami (apart from locally in Macaronesia), with the highest prediction for Western Sahara comparable to the 2011 Japanese tsunami.

== Climate ==
La Palma is characterized by two main climate types: the warm/hot summer Mediterranean climate (Köppen: Csb/Csa), characterized by dry summers and humid winters, is prevalent in the northern coast and in the mid to high altitudes of the island. At lower altitudes, particularly at the south and southwest coasts, the climate becomes semi-arid (Köppen: BSh). Average temperatures at the coast vary from 18 °C (64 °F) in January and February to 24 °C (75 °F) in August and September. For a Canary island, the weather is quite cloudy, as La Palma is far more exposed to marine air systems than easterly islands, caused by the Canary Current. As altitude increases moving inland, the climate becomes cooler and more humid, which provides conditions for laurisilva cloud forests to occur, such as the one in the Natural Park of Bosque de los Tiles.

Climate data for La Palma Airport WMO ID: 60005; Climate ID: C139E; coordinates 28°37′59″N 17°45′18″W; elevation: 33 m (108 ft); 1991–2020 provisional normals, extremes 1970–present
Month	Jan	Feb	Mar	Apr	May	Jun	Jul	Aug	Sep	Oct	Nov	Dec	Year
Record high °C (°F)	27.6 (81.7)	31.0 (87.8)	34.2 (93.6)	36.6 (97.9)	32.4 (90.3)	29.4 (84.9)	38.4 (101.1)	38.0 (100.4)	36.8 (98.2)	34.4 (93.9)	31.6 (88.9)	29.0 (84.2)	38.4 (101.1)
Mean maximum °C (°F)	24.0 (75.2)	24.7 (76.5)	25.7 (78.3)	25.2 (77.4)	25.8 (78.4)	26.5 (79.7)	28.8 (83.8)	29.1 (84.4)	29.0 (84.2)	29.2 (84.6)	27.8 (82.0)	25.5 (77.9)	32.3 (90.1)
Mean daily maximum °C (°F)	20.9 (69.6)	20.9 (69.6)	21.4 (70.5)	21.9 (71.4)	22.9 (73.2)	24.3 (75.7)	25.6 (78.1)	26.6 (79.9)	26.7 (80.1)	25.8 (78.4)	23.7 (74.7)	22.2 (72.0)	23.6 (74.5)
Daily mean °C (°F)	18.3 (64.9)	18.2 (64.8)	18.6 (65.5)	19.2 (66.6)	20.3 (68.5)	21.9 (71.4)	23.2 (73.8)	24.1 (75.4)	24.1 (75.4)	23.1 (73.6)	21.1 (70.0)	19.6 (67.3)	21.0 (69.8)
Mean daily minimum °C (°F)	15.6 (60.1)	15.4 (59.7)	15.8 (60.4)	16.4 (61.5)	17.6 (63.7)	19.3 (66.7)	20.8 (69.4)	21.7 (71.1)	21.5 (70.7)	20.3 (68.5)	18.5 (65.3)	16.9 (62.4)	18.3 (64.9)
Mean minimum °C (°F)	13.2 (55.8)	12.9 (55.2)	13.4 (56.1)	14.2 (57.6)	15.4 (59.7)	17.4 (63.3)	19.1 (66.4)	19.9 (67.8)	19.4 (66.9)	17.9 (64.2)	15.7 (60.3)	14.6 (58.3)	12.3 (54.1)
Record low °C (°F)	9.4 (48.9)	10.9 (51.6)	10.2 (50.4)	10.0 (50.0)	11.0 (51.8)	15.2 (59.4)	14.9 (58.8)	16.7 (62.1)	16.4 (61.5)	15.3 (59.5)	10.0 (50.0)	10.0 (50.0)	9.4 (48.9)
Average precipitation mm (inches)	38.8 (1.53)	51.5 (2.03)	24.6 (0.97)	17.3 (0.68)	4.4 (0.17)	2.4 (0.09)	1.0 (0.04)	1.9 (0.07)	11.9 (0.47)	42.8 (1.69)	56.5 (2.22)	74.9 (2.95)	328.1 (12.92)
Average precipitation days (≥ 0.1 mm)	9.13	8.17	6.87	5.20	3.53	2.17	0.90	1.37	4.24	8.76	10.90	11.40	72.63
Average relative humidity (%)	68.3	68.9	70.0	69.9	69.7	71.6	72.8	73.1	72.8	71.5	69.6	68.7	70.6
Mean monthly sunshine hours	145.3	146.0	183.7	181.1	196.5	203.1	235.8	223.4	185.8	173.2	138.0	139.8	2,151.7
Percentage possible sunshine	44.5	46.3	49.4	47.0	46.6	48.6	55.2	54.7	50.6	48.8	43.1	43.8	48.2
Source 1: State Meteorological Agency/AEMET OpenData
Source 2: NCEI (Sunshine hours)

Climate data for La Palma Airport, 1981-2010 normals
Month	Jan	Feb	Mar	Apr	May	Jun	Jul	Aug	Sep	Oct	Nov	Dec	Year
Mean daily maximum °C (°F)	20.6 (69.1)	20.7 (69.3)	21.2 (70.2)	21.6 (70.9)	22.6 (72.7)	24.1 (75.4)	25.5 (77.9)	26.3 (79.3)	26.6 (79.9)	25.5 (77.9)	23.5 (74.3)	21.8 (71.2)	23.3 (73.9)
Daily mean °C (°F)	18.1 (64.6)	18.0 (64.4)	18.5 (65.3)	18.9 (66.0)	20.0 (68.0)	21.7 (71.1)	23.1 (73.6)	23.9 (75.0)	24.0 (75.2)	22.8 (73.0)	20.9 (69.6)	19.3 (66.7)	20.7 (69.3)
Mean daily minimum °C (°F)	15.5 (59.9)	15.3 (59.5)	15.7 (60.3)	16.2 (61.2)	17.4 (63.3)	19.2 (66.6)	20.7 (69.3)	21.4 (70.5)	21.3 (70.3)	20.2 (68.4)	18.3 (64.9)	16.7 (62.1)	18.1 (64.6)
Average precipitation mm (inches)	49 (1.9)	57 (2.2)	33 (1.3)	18 (0.7)	7 (0.3)	2 (0.1)	1 (0.0)	1 (0.0)	12 (0.5)	41 (1.6)	70 (2.8)	80 (3.1)	369 (14.5)
Average precipitation days (≥ 1.0 mm)	5.3	4.3	3.9	2.7	1.3	0.4	0.3	0.4	1.8	5.2	6.8	7.9	40.3
Average relative humidity (%)	70	71	71	70	70	72	73	73	73	73	71	70	72
Mean monthly sunshine hours	141	146	177	174	192	188	222	209	187	175	140	138	2,106
Source: Agencia Estatal de Meteorología

== Government ==
The island is part of the province of Santa Cruz de Tenerife.

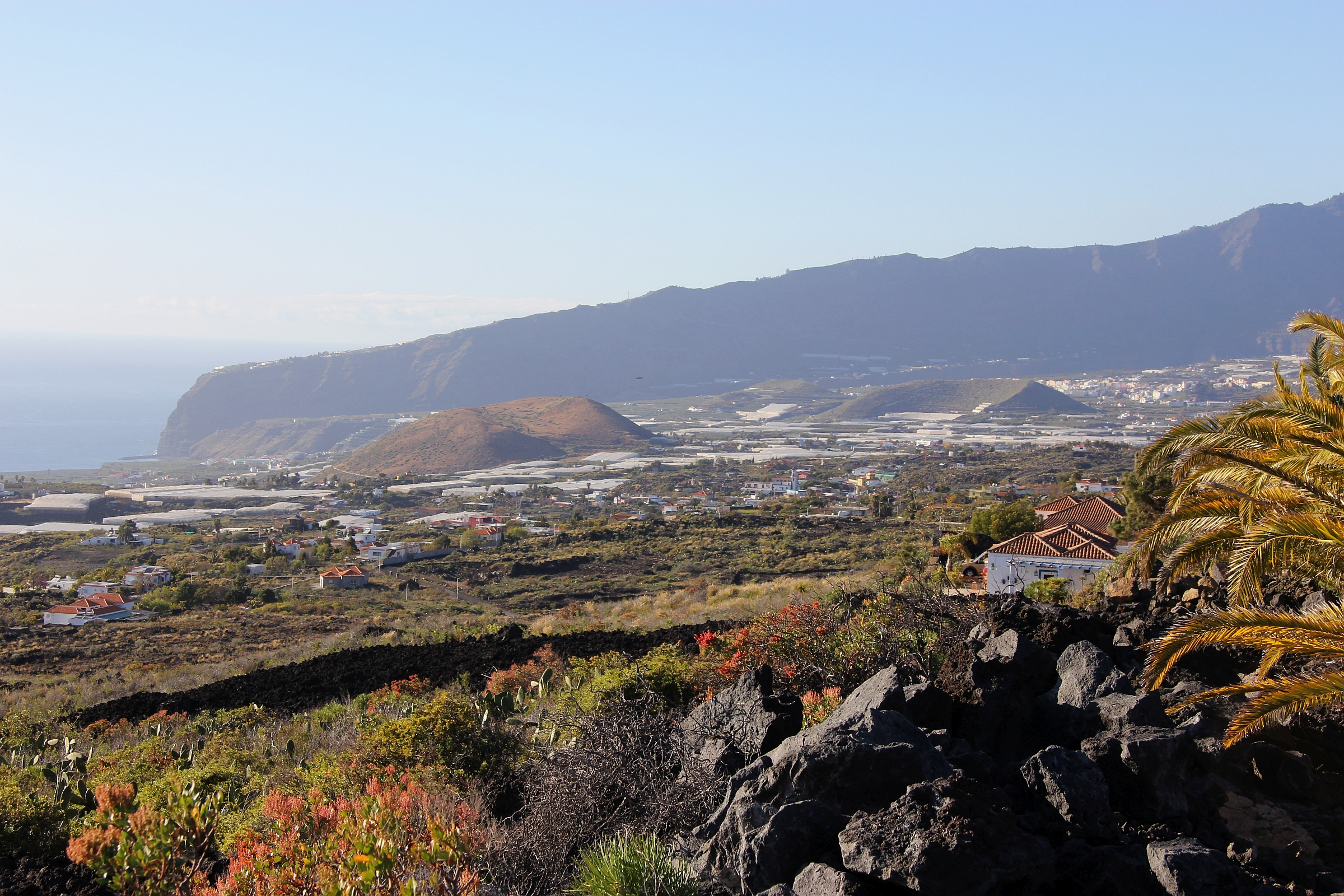
Los Llanos de Aridane

The island is divided into 14 municipalities:

Name	Area (km^{2})	Census Population			Estimated Population (2023)
Name	Area (km^{2})	2001	2011	2021	Estimated Population (2023)
Barlovento	43.55	2,382	2,067	1,966	1,992
Breña Alta	30.82	5,715	7,173	7,223	7,315
Breña Baja	14.20	3,621	5,323	5,871	5,966
Fuencaliente de la Palma	56.42	1,833	1,841	1,747	1,849
Garafía	103.00	1,795	1,566	1,844	1,949
Los Llanos de Aridane	35.79	17,720	20,493	20,773	20,375
El Paso	135.92	6,764	7,665	7,713	7,972
Puntagorda	31.10	1,675	1,730	2,311	2,380
Puntallana	35.12	2,337	2,407	2,552	2,612
San Andrés y Sauces	42.75	5,351	4,578	4,311	4,301
Santa Cruz de la Palma	43.38	17,265	16,568	15,546	15,522
Tazacorte	11.37	5,062	4,777	4,510	4,535
Tijarafe	53.76	2,730	2,675	2,548	2,632
Villa de Mazo	71.17	4,550	4,826	4,897	4,938
Totals	708.36	78,800	83,689	83,812	84,338

La Palma has a "sister city" relationship with El Dorado Hills, California.

== Economy ==
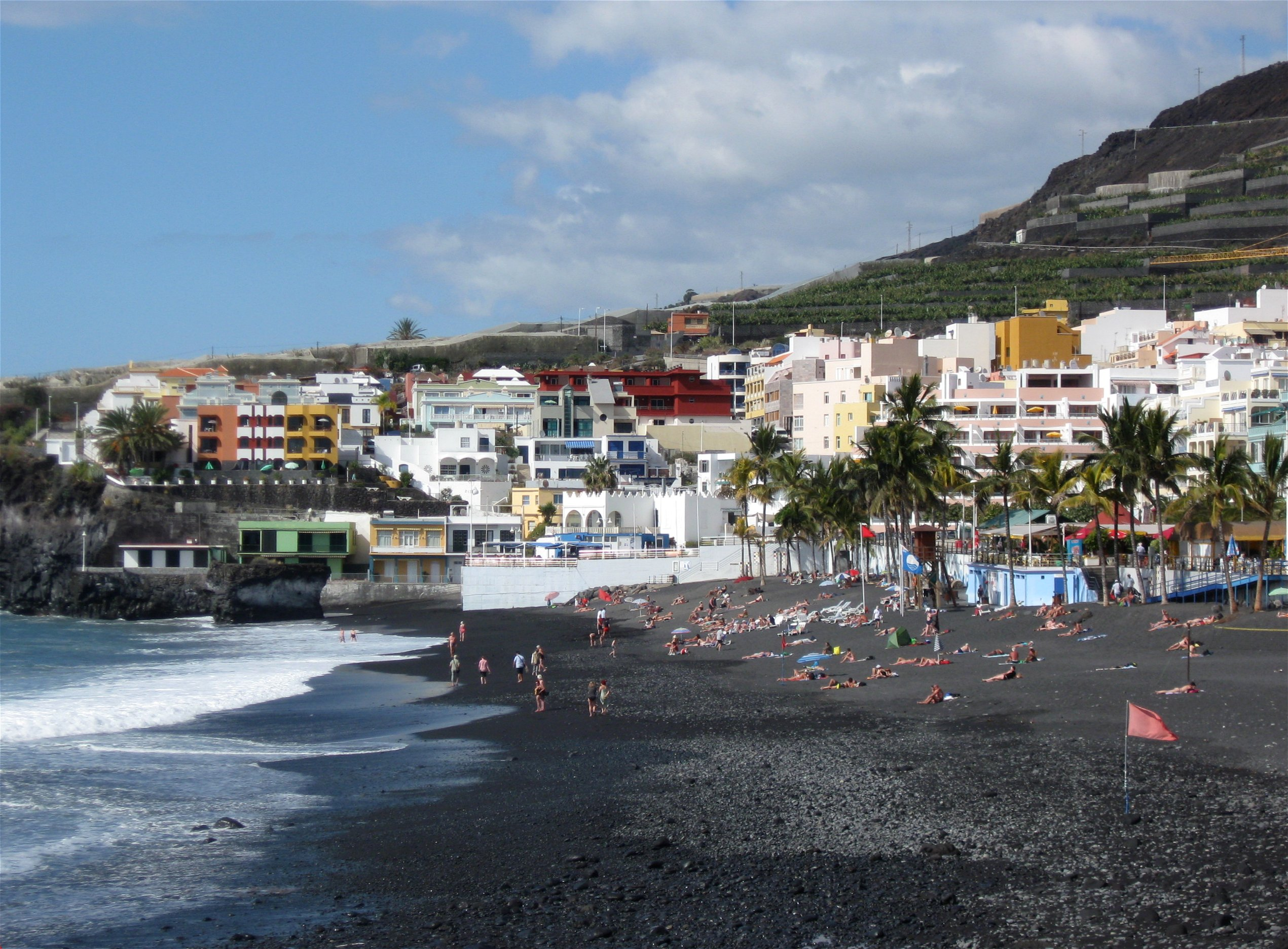
Black sand beach in Puerto Naos

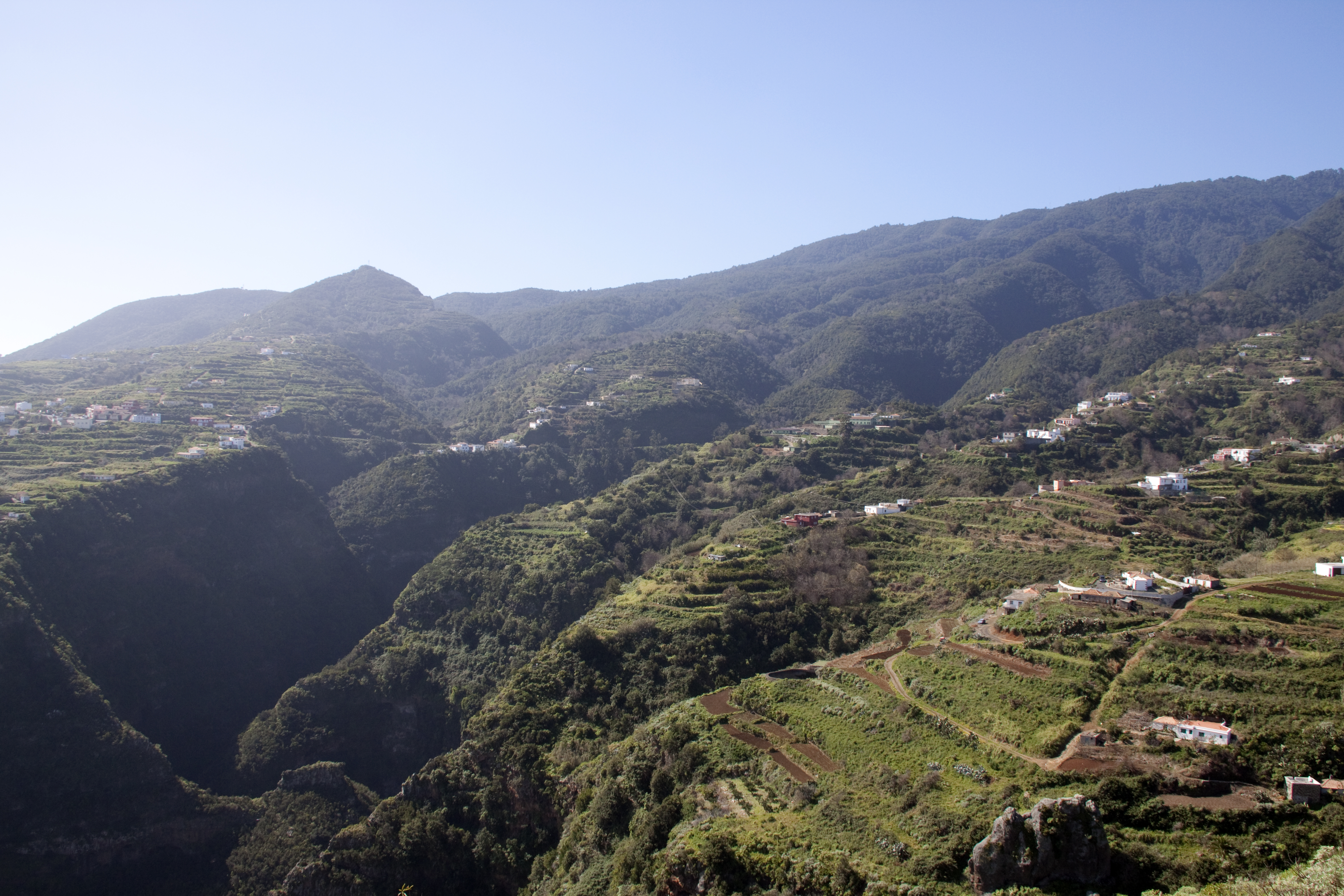
Terraced fields in La Palma

The local economy is primarily based on agriculture and tourism. Bananas are grown throughout the island with many banana farms on the western side of the island in Los Llanos de Aridane. Following the 2021 Cumbre Vieja volcanic eruption, studies have shown the volcanic activity did not significantly contaminate banana crops on the island. Other crops include bird of paradise flowers, oranges, avocados and grapes. Local ranchers raise cattle, sheep and goats. Fishermen operating from Santa Cruz de La Palma, Tazacorte, and Puerto Naos catch fish for the local markets.

== Flora and fauna ==
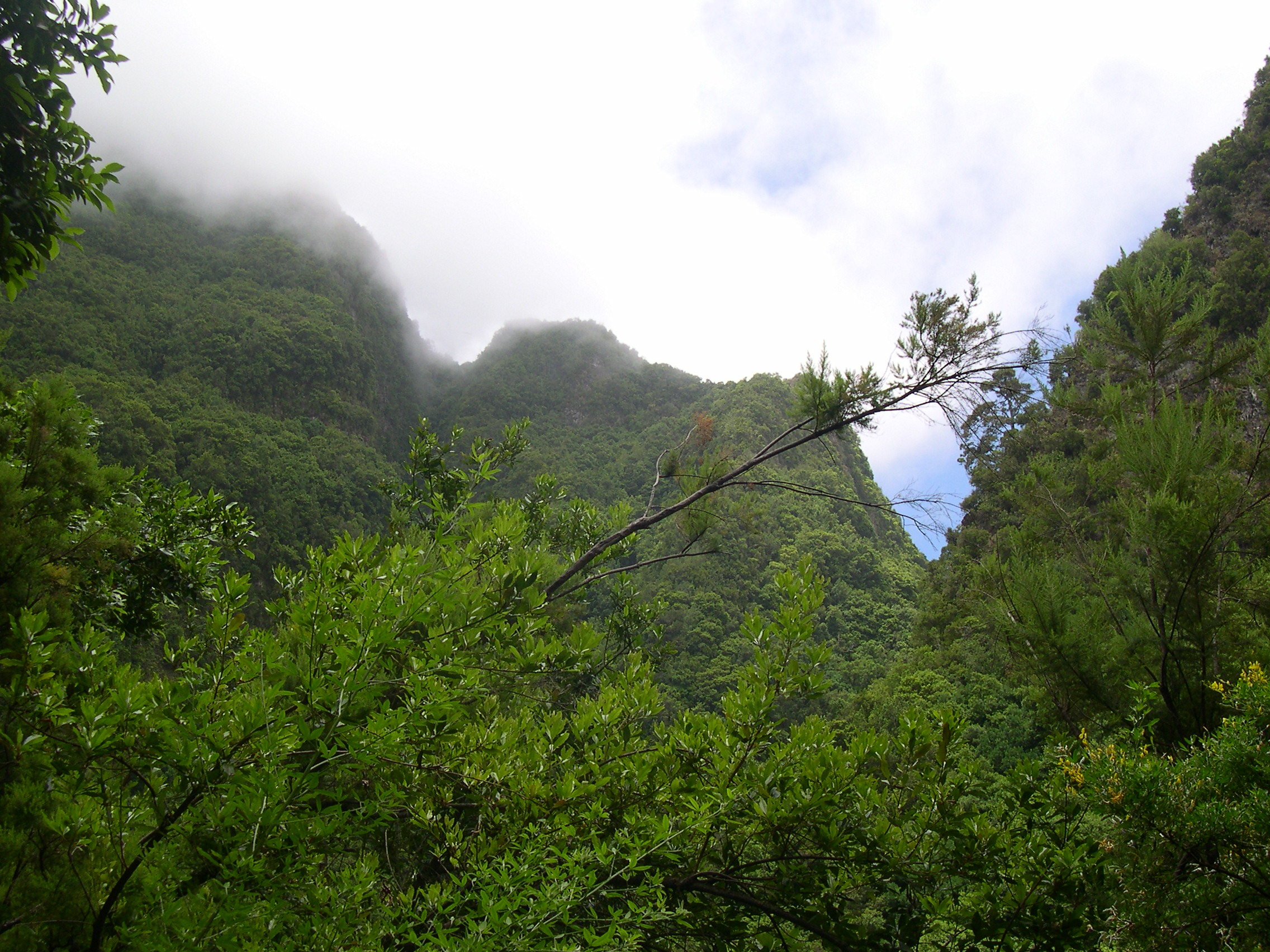
Laurisilva cloud forest in La Palma

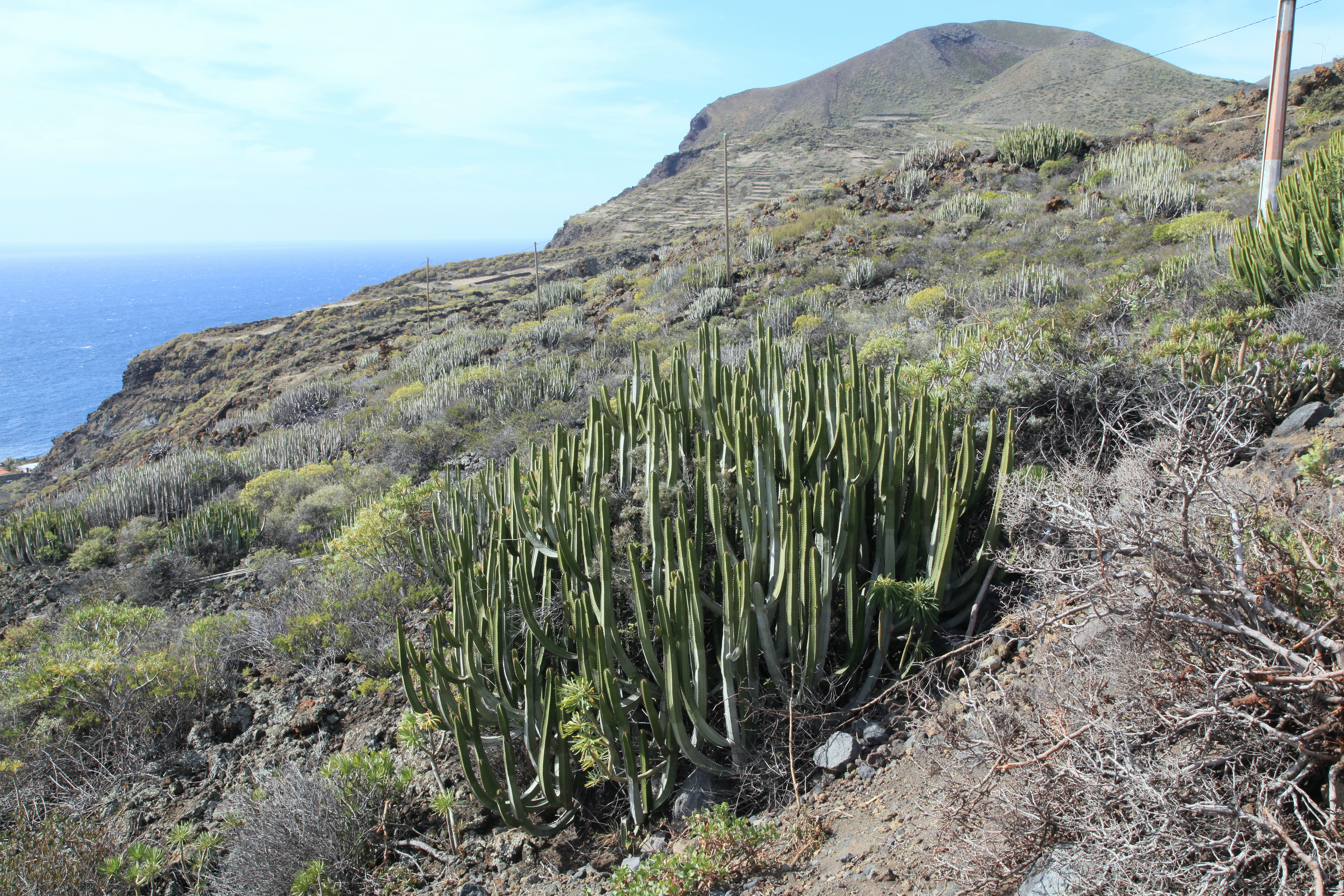
Euphorbia canariensis is a succulent endemic to the Canary Islands

La Palma has abundant plant life, including several endemic species.

Although large areas have been deforested, the upland areas of La Palma retain much of the evergreen laurel forest, where species of Lauraceae, such as Laurus azorica, Persea indica, and Ocotea foetens are a characteristic component. This is a relictual population of the Pliocene subtropical forests which used to cover the island.

The Canary Island pine is found on all of the western Canary Islands, but it is particularly abundant on La Palma. The pine forests are also home to two recently discovered and extremely rare La Palma endemics: Lotus eremiticus and L. pyranthus.

Cytisus supranubius, a white-flowered broom known locally as Retama del Teide, is native to La Palma and Tenerife, being restricted to the alpine/subalpine habitats present only in these two islands. Like Tenerife, La Palma also has its own alpine violet, Viola palmensis.

Echium pininana is endemic to La Palma and the tallest species in the genus, reaching over 4 m. It is related to Echium wildpretii which occurs, with separate subspecies, in the subalpine zone of both Tenerife and La Palma. Both species are monocarpic, producing a massive terminal inflorescence. Echium webbii, a branched shrub with several smaller, dark blue flower spikes, is another island endemic with close relatives on Tenerife.

Other La Palma endemics include members of the daisy family, such as Sonchus palmensis, Argyranthemum haouarytheum Pericallis papyracea and Cheirolophus sventenii.

Several animals are native or endemic to La Palma, including the:

- La Palma giant lizard, believed extinct until rediscovered in 2007
- Western Canaries lizard (Gallotia galloti subspecies palmae)
- Graja (Pyrrhocorax pyrrhocorax barbarus), subspecies of the red-billed chough
- Canary Islands chiffchaff (Phylloscopus canariensis)
- La Palma chaffinch (Fringilla canariensis palmae), subspecies of the Canary Islands chaffinch
- Western Canary Islands goldcrest (Regulus regulus ellenthalerae)
- Canary Islands quail (Coturnix gomerae), now extinct.
- Trias greenfinch (Chloris triasi), now extinct.

In addition, many other animals have been introduced, including rabbits and Barbary sheep, or aoudads, which have become a serious threat to endemic flora. The Garafian Sheepdog Breed originates on the island.

A biosphere reserve was established in 1983, and extended and renamed in 1997 and 2002.

== Natural symbols ==
The official natural symbols associated with La Palma are the red-billed chough (graja) and Pinus canariensis (Canary Island pine).

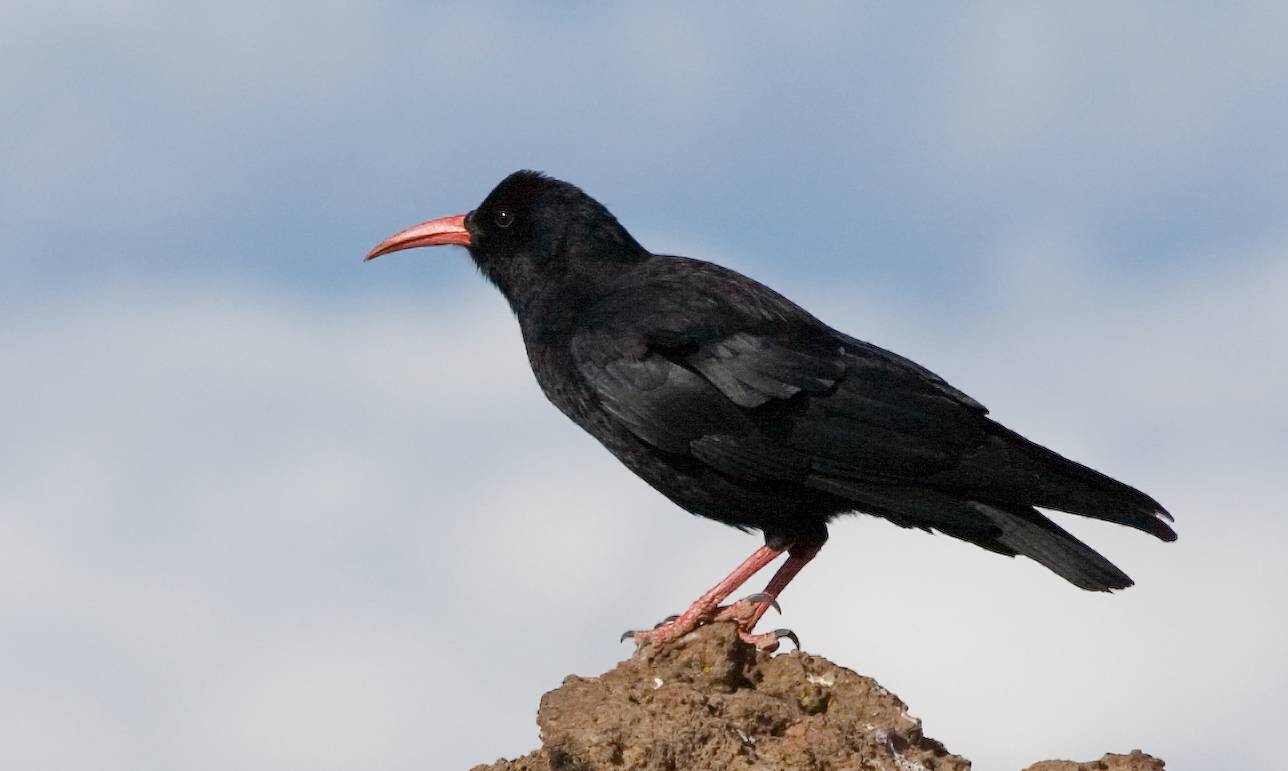
Red-billed chough

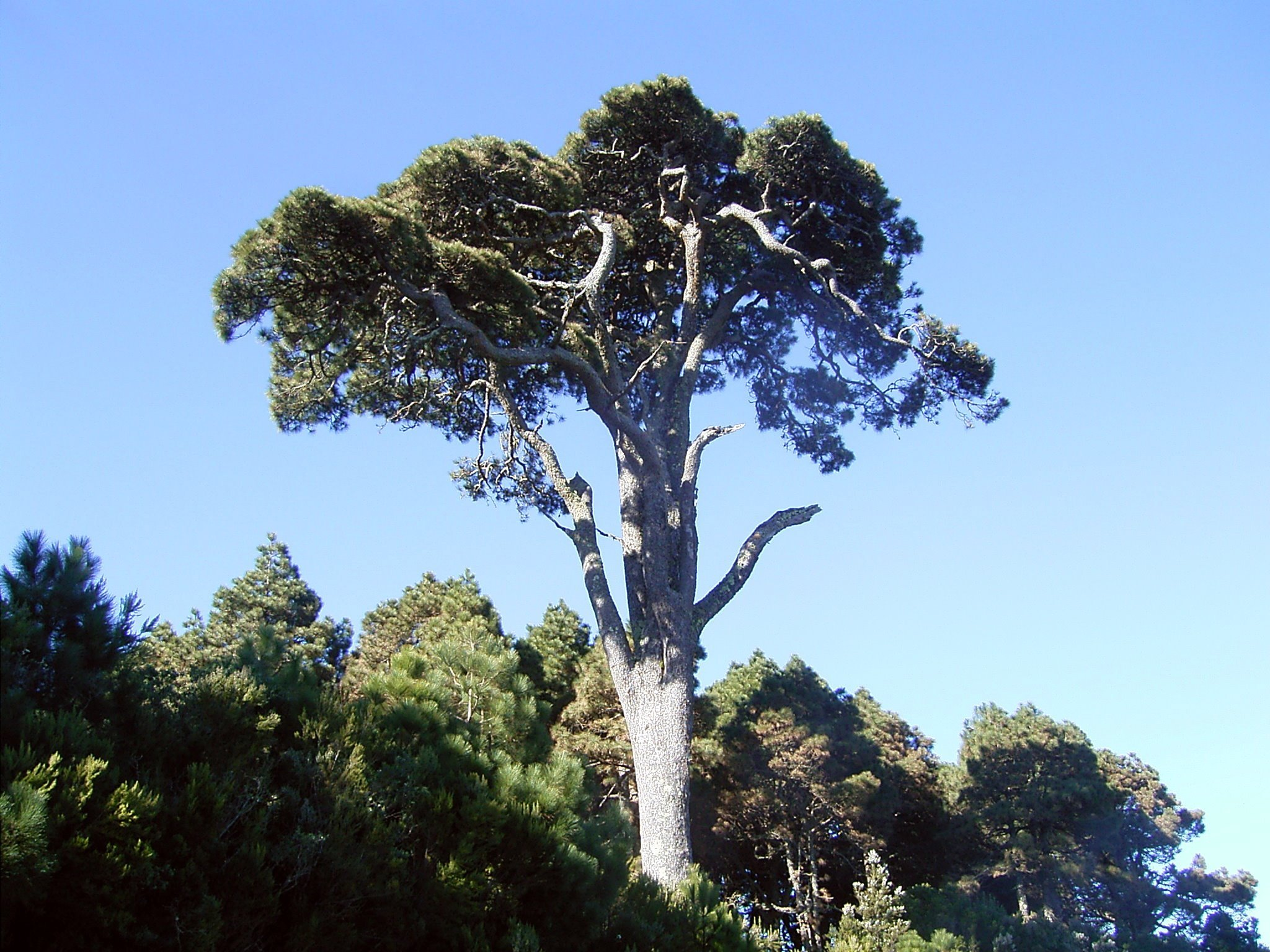
Pinus canariensis

== History ==
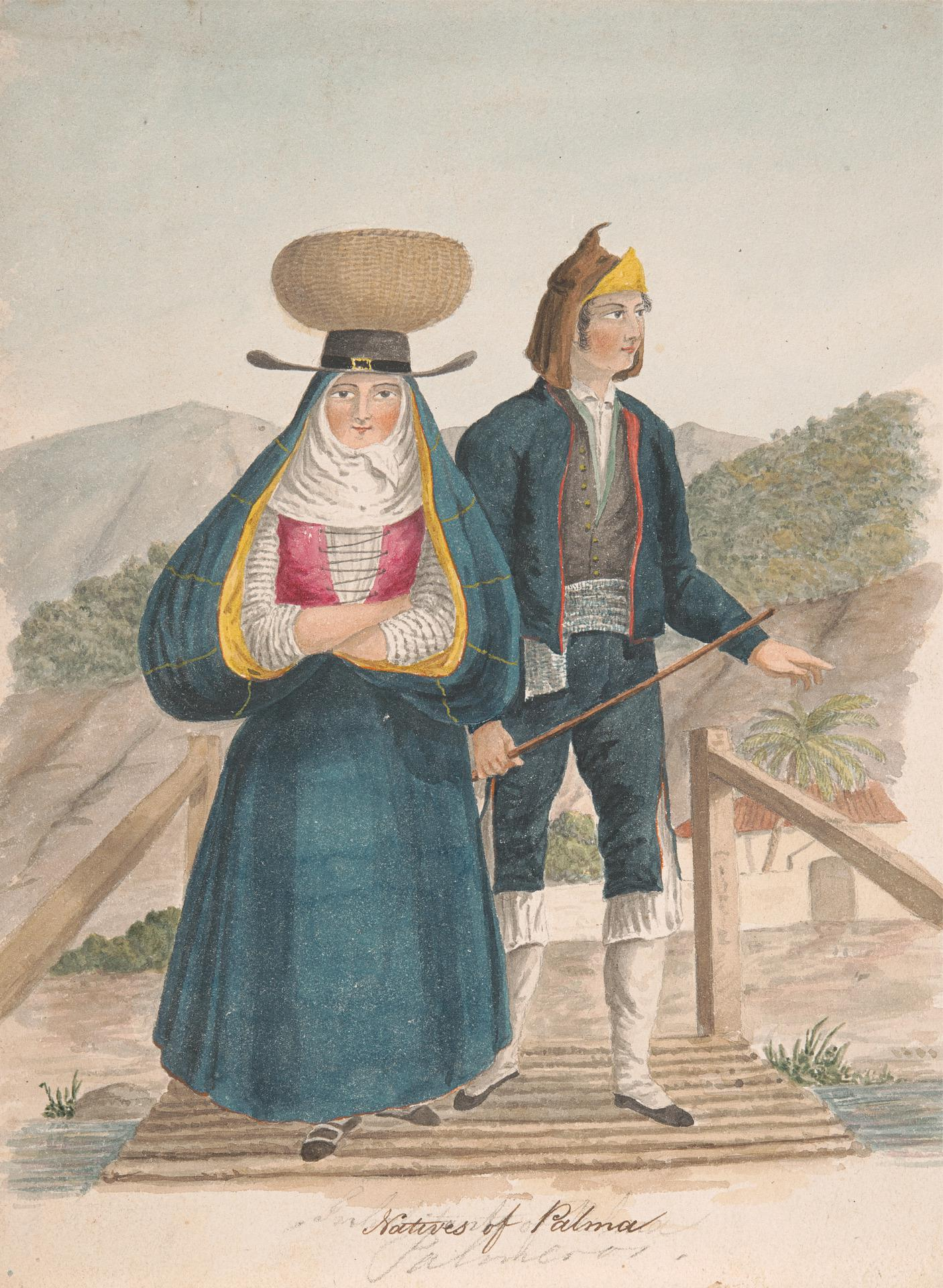
Natives of La Palma, by Alfred Diston, 1825

At the time of European colonization, the Canary Islands were inhabited by native Canarians, referred to collectively as Guanches, although the natives of La Palma are more correctly known as Auaritas (See Canary Islands in pre-colonial times). The origin of these natives is unclear but they are believed to share common ancestry with the Berbers of North Africa. The Guanches had a Neolithic culture divided into several clans led by chiefs. Their name for La Palma was Benahoare. The main remnants of this culture are their cave dwellings, enigmatic petroglyphs and paved stone paths through the mountains. After the Spanish occupation of La Palma, the native Canarians vanished by either being killed, sold into slavery or by assimilating into the Spanish population.

It is believed that the Canary Islands were known to the Phoenicians and Greeks, but the earliest written evidence is by the Roman writer Pliny the Elder, who quoted Juba II of Numidia, but Juba's writings were subsequently lost. The Genoese navigator Lancelotto Malocello reached the archipelago in 1312 and remained for two decades until expelled by a native uprising. In 1404 the Spaniards began the conquest of the islands. Though the first landing on La Palma was in 1405, it took until 1493 and several bloody battles until the last resistance of the natives was broken. The conqueror of La Palma was Alonso Fernández de Lugo, who defeated Tanausu, the last king on the island. He ruled the area known as Acero (Caldera de Taburiente). Tanausu was ambushed after agreeing to a truce arranged by Fernández de Lugo and Juan de Palma, a Guanche who had converted to Christianity and who was a relative of Tanausu.

For the next two centuries, settlements on La Palma became rich as the island served as a trading post on the way to the New World. La Palma received immigrants from Castile, Mallorca, Andalusia, Portugal and Catalonia.

== Religion ==
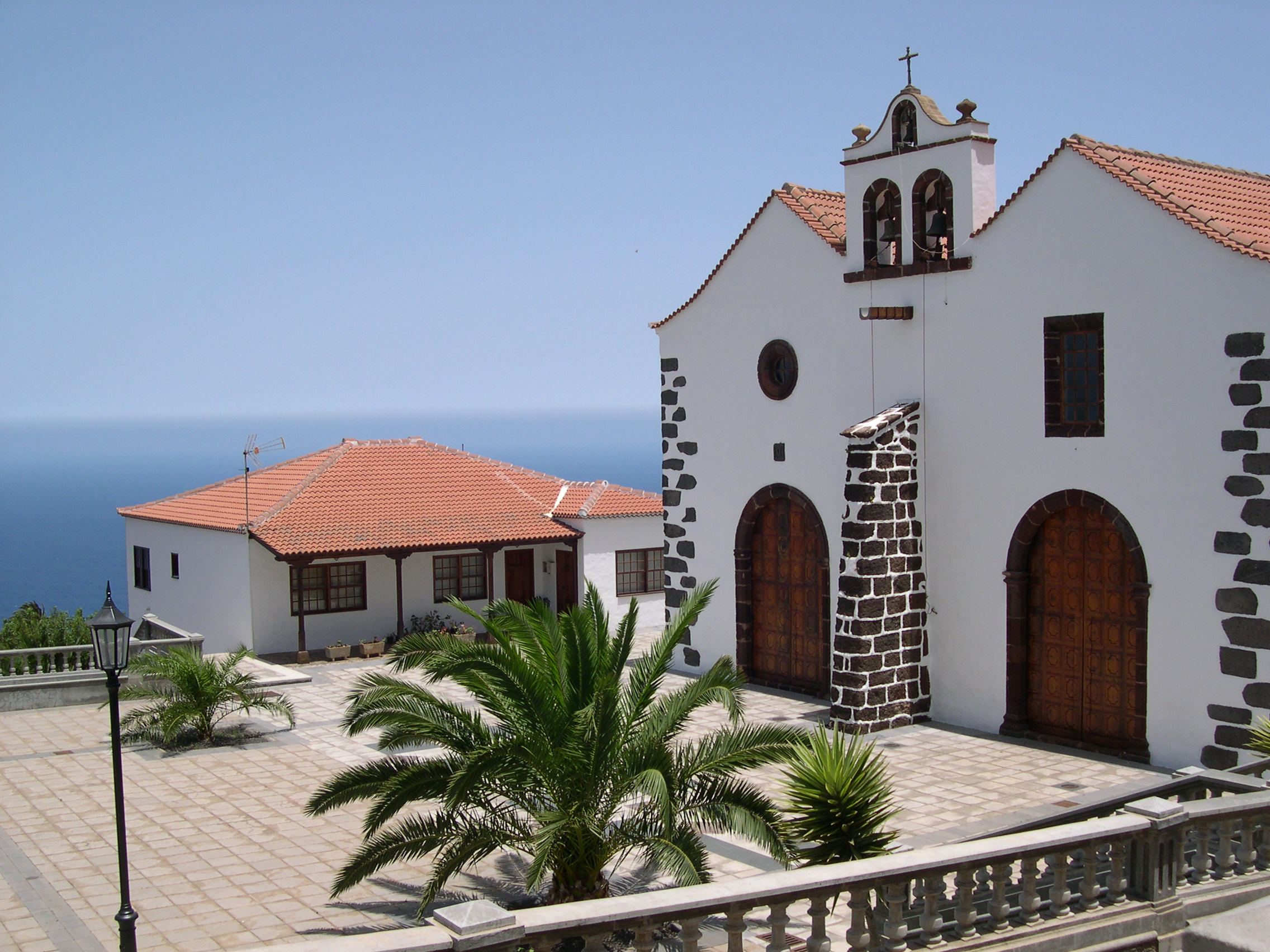
Iglesia Nuestra Señora de La Luz

The island is predominately Roman Catholic and since 1676, has been known for the festival of Fiestas Lustrales de la Bajada de la Virgen de las Nieves (the bringing down of the Virgin of the Snow, Virgen de las Nieves), which has a rich history, from the time of the Bishop of the Canaries, Bartolomé García Ximénez. The festival features the dancing of "enanos" or midgets. The costumes that people wear have a hole at the top of the hat to allow them to see out, while giving the appearance of dancing midgets. People come from all over the world for the celebration which happens every five years. The image of the Virgin is taken down from her sanctuary (located in a hilly area on the outskirts of Santa Cruz de La Palma) and paraded around the city of Santa Cruz with the festival lasting nearly two weeks before she is returned. The last occasion was in 2025, and the next will be in 2030.

The Virgin of the Snow is the patron saint of La Palma. Many women on the island have the name "Nieves" in her honor. Every 5 August the annual festival of the Virgin is celebrated.

== Transport ==
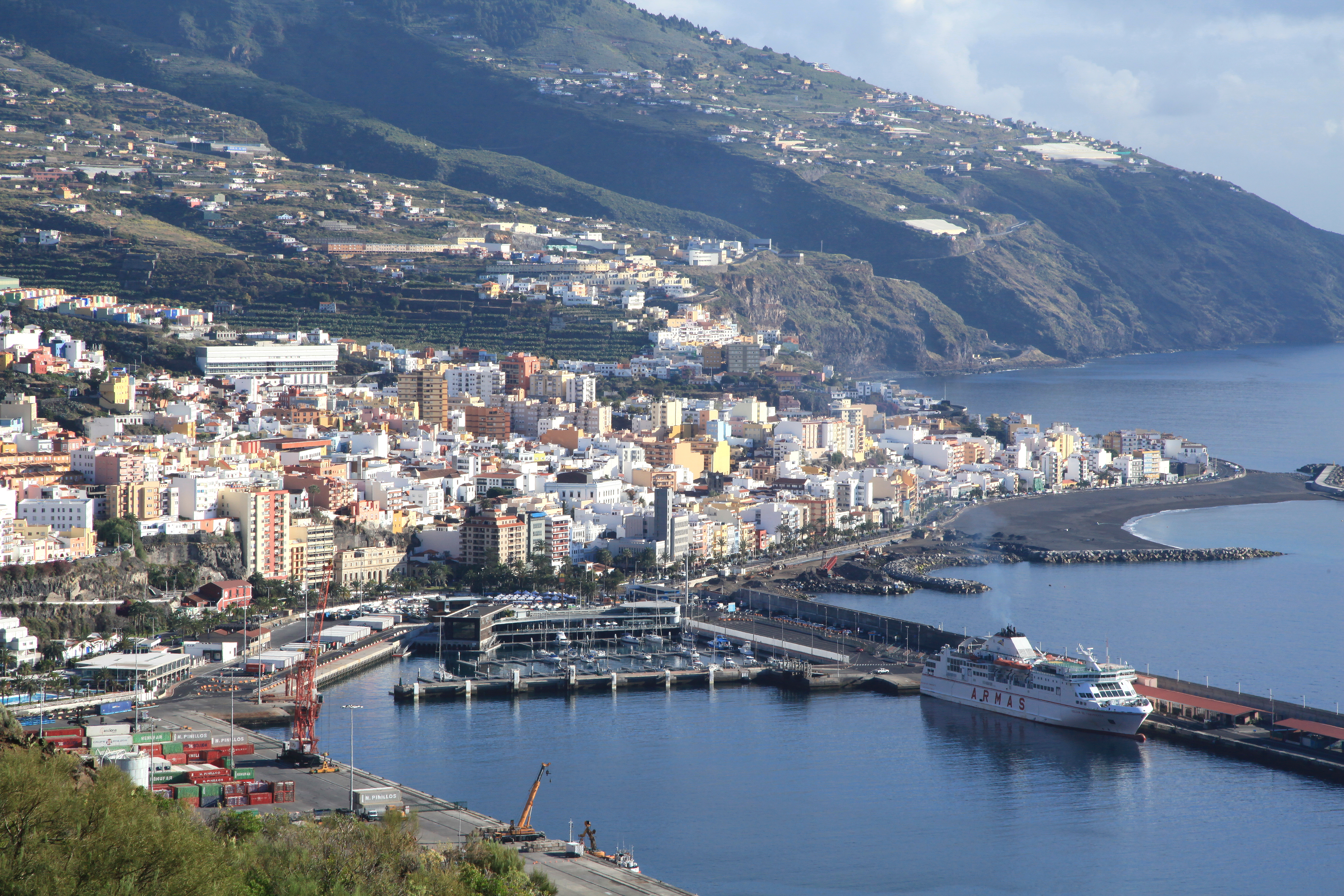
Santa Cruz de La Palma has the only major port in the island

La Palma has a road network of some 1,200 km (746 mi). All the main roads are asphalted and in a good state, although there are many sharp bends, some very narrow. In order to reach some small hamlets in the north of the island it is necessary to travel on unpaved roads. A good paved road approximately 180 km (112 mi), circumscribes the island. Several bus routes exist that unite the main settlements on the island.

A road crosses the island from Tazacorte on the west coast to the capital city on the east coast of the island. This road is a two-lane highway that includes a pair of two-lane tunnels. The older tunnel is shorter (1,100 m (3,609 ft)) and higher than the newer tunnel (2,880 m (9,449 ft)). When traveling from one side of the mountain to the other it is common to enter one side in complete clouds (the east side) and come out to the sunny side (western side). This is due to the clouds not being able to cross the mountains, an effect caused by the counter trade wind.

La Palma Airport is served mainly by Binter Canarias and CanaryFly, and Iberia, with flights to and from Tenerife and Gran Canaria, and also to and from mainland Spain, Germany, United Kingdom, Scandinavia, and the Netherlands.

There is also ferry service between the city of Santa Cruz de La Palma and the islands of Tenerife and Gran Canaria.

== Water tunnels ==
The minas galerias (water tunnels) carry water from sources in the highlands to towns, villages and farms. La Palma receives almost all of its water from the mar de nubes (sea of clouds) of the northeast trade winds. The water condenses on the vegetation, from where it runs into the ground. Eventually it collects inside the rock strata, and is then drained via the galerias into aqueducts and pipes for distribution. The galerias have been cut into the rocks over centuries. It is possible to walk alongside many of the aqueducts, a popular activity for tourists (similar to the levadas of Madeira). The tour to the Marcos y Corderos waterfall and springs is also popular.

There is an extensive network of irrigation canals in the valley of Los Llanos de Aridane. These canals carry water from the mountains throughout the valley and allow for the cultivation of bananas, avocados, flowers, and other plants.

== Observatories ==
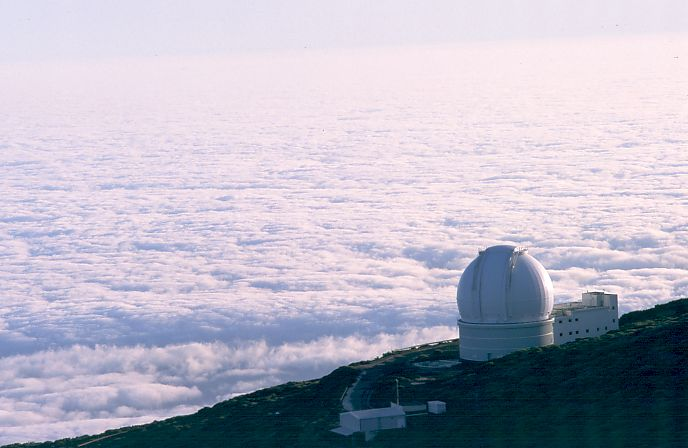
A sea of clouds below the William Herschel Telescope

Due to the location of the island and the height of its mountains, some 2,400 m (7,874 ft) above sea level, a number of international astronomical observatories have been built on the Roque de los Muchachos. The particular geographical position and climate cause clouds to form between 1,000 m (3,281 ft) and 2,000 m (6,562 ft), usually leaving the observatories with a clear sky. Often, the view from the top of the volcano is a sea of clouds covering the eastern part of the island. Telescopes at the observatory include:

- The Isaac Newton Group of Telescopes (ING) operates three telescopes: the 4.2 m (14 ft) William Herschel Telescope, the 2.5 m (8 ft 2 in) Isaac Newton Telescope and the 1 m (3 ft 3 in) Jacobus Kapteyn Telescope.
- The 2.5 m (8 ft 2 in) Nordic Optical Telescope (NOT).
- The 1 m (3 ft 3 in) Swedish 1-m Solar Telescope (SST) operated by the Institute for Solar Physics.
- The 0.45 m (1 ft 6 in) Dutch Open Telescope (DOT), also a solar telescope.
- A 0.6 m (2 ft 0 in) optical telescope.
- The Carlsberg Meridian Telescope (CMT).
- The 1.2 m (3 ft 11 in) Mercator Telescope.
- The 2 m (6 ft 7 in) Liverpool Telescope.
- The 10.4 m (34 ft) Gran Telescopio Canarias (Great Canary Telescope, dedicated 24 July 2009).
- The 3.6 m (12 ft) Telescopio Nazionale Galileo (TNG).
- The 17 m (56 ft) MAGIC Telescope, an air shower Cherenkov telescope for observing high energy gamma rays
- The SuperWASP-North telescope, used to detect extrasolar planets.
- The northern node of the Gravitational-wave Optical Transient Observer (GOTO).

In addition, the Cherenkov Telescope Array is planned for construction starting in 2021.

In December 2021 the Roque de Los Muchachos Visitor Centre was inaugurated.

== In popular culture ==
The 2024 Netflix original Norwegian series La Palma is inspired by the disproved theory about possible catastrophic events that could happen on the island.

== See also ==
- Geology of the Canary Islands
- List of volcanoes in Spain
