= Roque de los Muchachos =

Mountain in La Palma, Canary Islands, Spain

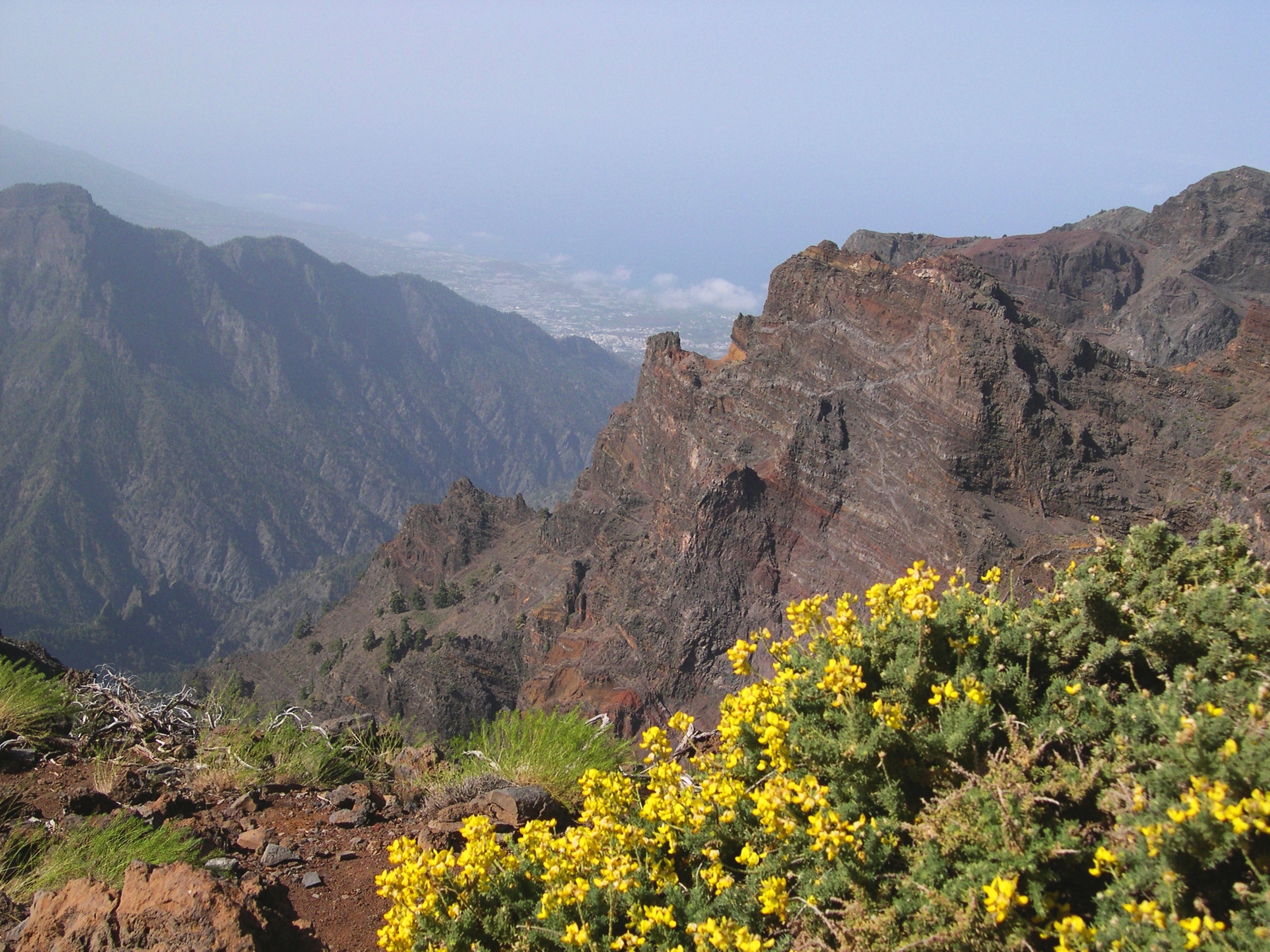

Highest point
- Elevation: 2,426 m (7,959 ft)
- Prominence: 2,426 m (7,959 ft)
- Listing: Ultra; Ribu
- Coordinates: 28°45′17″N 17°53′06″W

Geography
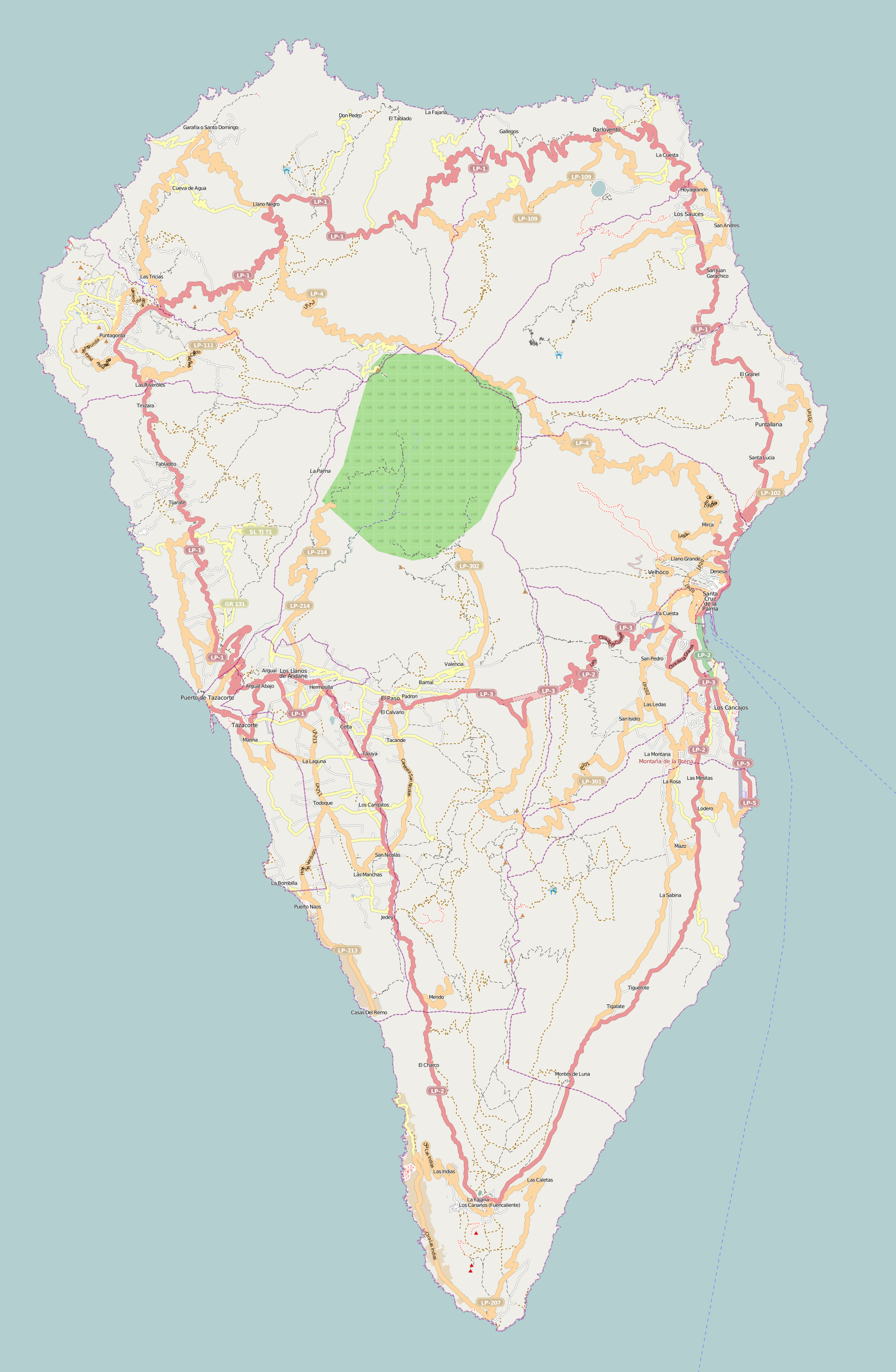
- Location within Canary Islands Location within La Palma
- Location: La Palma, Canary Islands, Spain

Geology
- Mountain type: Eroded volcano

Roque de los Muchachos (English: "Rock of the Boys") is a rocky mound at the highest point on the island of La Palma in the Canary Islands, Spain. The rocks are found at an elevation of 2,426 metres (7,959 ft) above sea level, not far from the Observatorio del Roque de los Muchachos, where some of the world's largest telescopes are situated; the altitude and the dryness of the climate here give rise to excellent observing conditions. The rocks are contained with the Parque Nacional de la Caldera de Taburiente.

From the Roque, one can see the islands of Tenerife, El Hierro and La Gomera.

== See also ==
- List of European ultra prominent peaks
