= Lava =

Molten rock expelled by a volcano during an eruption

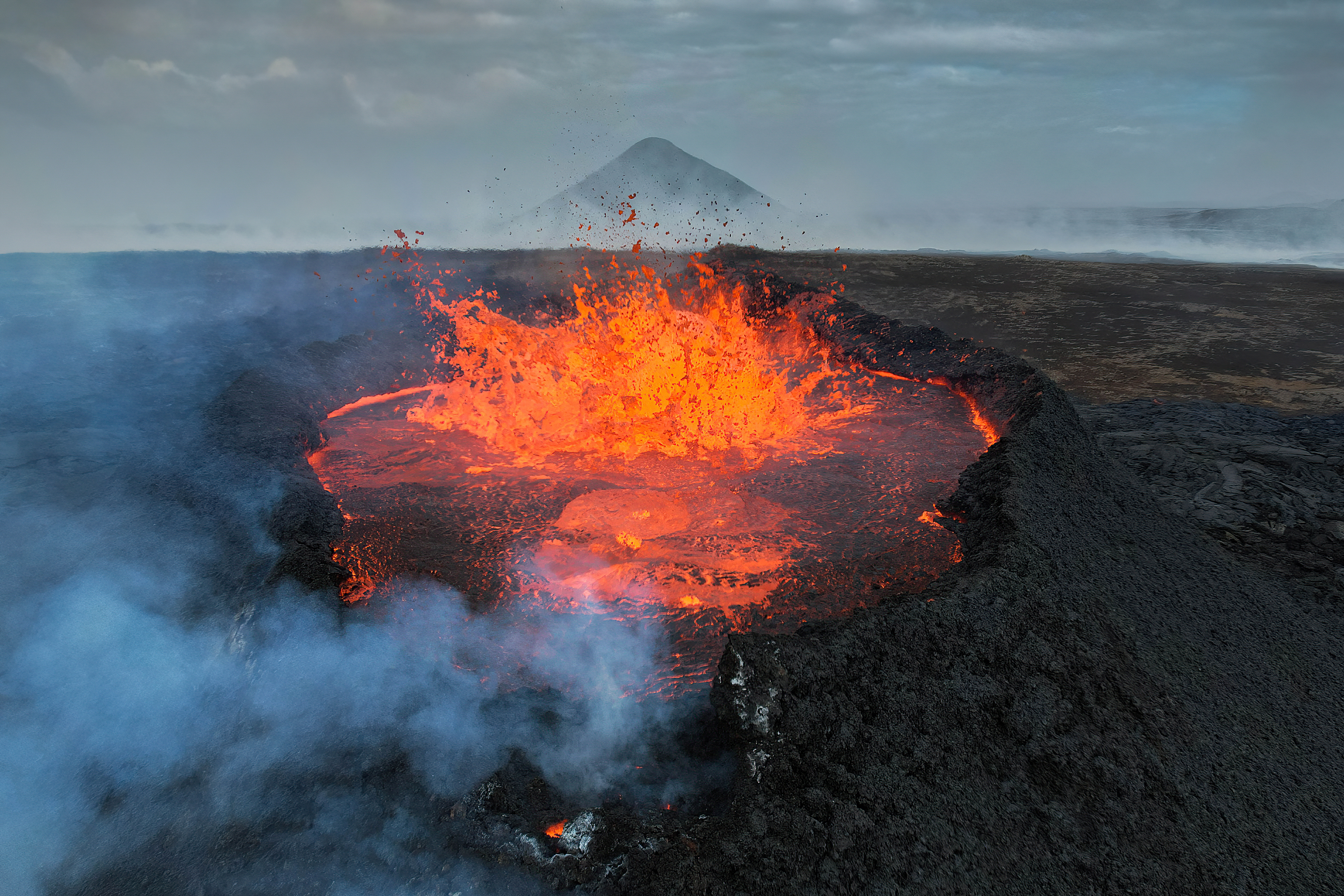
Fresh lava from Fagradalsfjall volcano eruption in Iceland, 2023

Lava is magma that has been expelled from the interior of a terrestrial planet (such as Earth) or a moon onto its surface. Lava may be erupted at a volcano or through a fracture in the crust, on land or underwater, usually at temperatures from 800 to 1,200 °C (1,470 to 2,190 °F). Lava may be erupted directly onto the land surface or onto the sea floor or it may be ejected into the atmosphere before falling back down. The solid volcanic rock resulting from subsequent cooling of the molten material is often also called lava.

A lava flow is an outpouring of lava during an effusive eruption. (An explosive eruption, by contrast, produces a mixture of volcanic ash and other fragments called tephra, not lava flows.) The viscosity of most molten lava is about that of ketchup, roughly 10,000 to 100,000 times that of water (the latter two substances measured at 25 °C (77 °F) and 1 atm). Even so, lava can flow great distances before cooling causes it to solidify, because lava exposed to air quickly develops a solid crust that insulates the remaining liquid lava, helping to keep it hot and inviscid enough to continue flowing.

== Etymology ==
The word lava comes from Italian and originally describes a stream caused by sudden rain. It is probably derived from the Latin word labes, meaning a 'fall' or 'slide'. An alternative explanation is that it is derived from lavare, 'to wash.' An early use of the word in connection with extrusion of magma from below the surface is found in a short account of the 1737 eruption of Vesuvius, written by Francesco Serao, who described "a flow of fiery lava" as an analogy to the flow of water and mud down the flanks of the volcano (a lahar) after heavy rain.

== Properties ==
=== Composition ===
Video of lava agitating and bubbling in the volcano eruption of Litli-Hrútur, 2023

Solidified lava on the Earth's crust is predominantly silicate minerals: mostly feldspars, feldspathoids, olivine, pyroxenes, amphiboles, micas and quartz. Rare nonsilicate lavas can be formed by local melting of nonsilicate mineral deposits or by separation of a magma into immiscible silicate and nonsilicate liquid phases.

==== Silicate ====
Silicate lavas are molten mixtures dominated by oxygen and silicon, the most abundant elements of the Earth's crust, with smaller quantities of aluminium, calcium, magnesium, iron, sodium, and potassium and minor amounts of many other elements. Petrologists routinely express the composition of a silicate lava in terms of the weight or molar mass fraction of the oxides of the major elements (other than oxygen) present in the lava.

The silica component dominates the physical behavior of silicate magmas. Silicon ions in lava strongly bind to four oxygen ions in a tetrahedral arrangement. If an oxygen ion is bound to two silicon ions in the melt, it is described as a bridging oxygen, and lava with many clumps or chains of silicon ions connected by bridging oxygen ions is described as partially polymerized. Aluminium in combination with alkali metal oxides (sodium and potassium) also tends to polymerize the lava. Other cations, such as ferrous iron, calcium, and magnesium, bond much more weakly to oxygen and reduce the tendency to polymerize. Partial polymerization makes the lava viscous, so lava high in silica is much more viscous than lava low in silica.

Because of the role of silica in determining viscosity and because many other properties of a lava (such as its temperature) are observed to correlate with silica content, silicate lavas are divided into four chemical types based on silica content: felsic, intermediate, mafic, and ultramafic.

===== Felsic =====
Felsic or silicic lavas have a silica content greater than 63%. They include rhyolite, rhyodacite and dacite lavas. With such a high silica content, these lavas are extremely viscous, ranging from 10^{8} cP (10^{5} Pa⋅s) for hot rhyolite lava at 1,200 °C (2,190 °F) to 10^{11} cP (10^{8} Pa⋅s) for cool rhyolite lava at 800 °C (1,470 °F). For comparison, water has a viscosity of about 1 cP (0.001 Pa⋅s). Because of this very high viscosity, felsic lavas usually erupt explosively to produce pyroclastic (fragmental) deposits. However, rhyolite lavas occasionally erupt effusively to form lava spines, lava domes or "coulees" (which are thick, short lava flows). The lavas typically fragment as they extrude, producing block lava flows. These often contain obsidian.

Felsic magmas can erupt at temperatures as low as 800 °C (1,470 °F). Unusually hot (>950 °C; >1,740 °F) rhyolite lavas, however, may flow for distances of many tens of kilometres, such as in the Snake River Plain of the northwestern United States.

===== Intermediate =====
Intermediate or andesitic lavas contain 52% to 63% silica, and are lower in aluminium and usually somewhat richer in magnesium and iron than felsic lavas. Intermediate lavas form andesite domes and block lavas and may occur on steep composite volcanoes, such as in the Andes. They are also commonly hotter than felsic lavas, in the range of 850 to 1,100 °C (1,560 to 2,010 °F). Because of their lower silica content and higher eruptive temperatures, they tend to be much less viscous, with a typical viscosity of 3.5 million cP (3,500 Pa⋅s) at 1,200 °C (2,190 °F). This is slightly greater than the viscosity of smooth peanut butter. Intermediate lavas show a greater tendency to form phenocrysts. Higher iron and magnesium tends to manifest as a darker groundmass, including amphibole or pyroxene phenocrysts.

===== Mafic =====
Mafic or basaltic lavas are typified by relatively high magnesium oxide and iron oxide content (whose molecular formulas provide the consonants in mafic) and have a silica content limited to a range of 52% to 45%. They generally erupt at temperatures of 1,100 to 1,200 °C (2,010 to 2,190 °F) and at relatively low viscosities, around 10^{4} to 10^{5} cP (10 to 100 Pa⋅s). This is similar to the viscosity of ketchup, although it is still many orders of magnitude higher than that of water. Mafic lavas tend to produce low-profile shield volcanoes or flood basalts, because the less viscous lava can flow for long distances from the vent. The thickness of a solidified basaltic lava flow, particularly on a low slope, may be much greater than the thickness of the moving molten lava flow at any one time, because basaltic lavas may "inflate" by a continued supply of lava and its pressure on a solidified crust. Most basaltic lavas are of ʻaʻā or pāhoehoe types, rather than block lavas. Underwater, they can form pillow lavas, which are rather similar to entrail-type pahoehoe lavas on land.

===== Ultramafic =====
Ultramafic lavas, such as komatiite and highly magnesian magmas that form boninite, take the composition and temperatures of eruptions to the extreme. All have a silica content under 45%. Komatiites contain over 18% magnesium oxide and are thought to have erupted at temperatures of 1,600 °C (2,910 °F). At this temperature there is practically no polymerization of the mineral compounds, creating a highly mobile liquid. Viscosities of komatiite magmas are thought to have been as low as 100 to 1000 cP (0.1 to 1 Pa⋅s), similar to that of light motor oil. Most ultramafic lavas are no younger than the Proterozoic, with a few ultramafic magmas known from the Phanerozoic in Central America that are attributed to a hot mantle plume. No modern komatiite lavas are known, as the Earth's mantle has cooled too much to produce highly magnesian magmas.

===== Alkaline =====
Some silicate lavas have an elevated content of alkali metal oxides (sodium and potassium), particularly in regions of continental rifting, areas overlying deeply subducted plates, or at intraplate hotspots. Their silica content can range from ultramafic (nephelinites, basanites and tephrites) to felsic (trachytes). They are more likely to be generated at greater depths in the mantle than subalkaline magmas. Olivine nephelinite lavas are both ultramafic and highly alkaline, and are thought to have come from much deeper in the mantle of the Earth than other lavas.

Examples of lava compositions (wt%)
Component	Nephelinite	Tholeiitic picrite	Tholeiitic basalt	Andesite	Rhyolite
SiO_{2}	39.7	46.4	53.8	60.0	73.2
TiO_{2}	2.8	2.0	2.0	1.0	0.2
Al_{2}O_{3}	11.4	8.5	13.9	16.0	14.0
Fe_{2}O_{3}	5.3	2.5	2.6	1.9	0.6
FeO	8.2	9.8	9.3	6.2	1.7
MnO	0.2	0.2	0.2	0.2	0.0
MgO	12.1	20.8	4.1	3.9	0.4
CaO	12.8	7.4	7.9	5.9	1.3
Na_{2}O	3.8	1.6	3.0	3.9	3.9
K_{2}O	1.2	0.3	1.5	0.9	4.1
P_{2}O_{5}	0.9	0.2	0.4	0.2	0.0

Tholeiitic basalt lava
1. SiO_{2} (53.8%)
2. Al_{2}O_{3} (13.9%)
3. FeO (9.30%)
4. CaO (7.90%)
5. MgO (4.10%)
6. Na_{2}O (3.00%)
7. Fe_{2}O_{3} (2.60%)
8. TiO_{2} (2.00%)
9. K_{2}O (1.50%)
10. P_{2}O_{5} (0.40%)
11. MnO (0.20%)
Rhyolite lava
1. SiO_{2} (73.2%)
2. Al_{2}O_{3} (14.0%)
3. FeO (1.70%)
4. CaO (1.30%)
5. MgO (0.40%)
6. Na_{2}O (3.90%)
7. Fe_{2}O_{3} (0.60%)
8. TiO_{2} (0.20%)
9. K_{2}O (4.10%)
10. P_{2}O_{5} (0.00%)
11. MnO (0.00%)

==== Non-silicate ====
Some lavas of unusual composition have erupted onto the surface of the Earth. These include:

- Carbonatite and natrocarbonatite lavas are known from Ol Doinyo Lengai volcano in Tanzania, which is the sole example of an active carbonatite volcano. Carbonatites in the geologic record are typically 75% carbonate minerals, with lesser amounts of silica-undersaturated silicate minerals (such as micas and olivine), apatite, magnetite, and pyrochlore. This may not reflect the original composition of the lava, which may have included sodium carbonate that was subsequently removed by hydrothermal activity, though laboratory experiments show that a calcite-rich magma is possible. Carbonatite lavas show stable isotope ratios indicating they are derived from the highly alkaline silicic lavas with which they are always associated, probably by separation of an immiscible phase. Natrocarbonatite lavas of Ol Doinyo Lengai are composed mostly of sodium carbonate, with about half as much calcium carbonate and half again as much potassium carbonate, and minor amounts of halides, fluorides, and sulphates. The lavas are extremely fluid, with viscosities only slightly greater than water, and are very cool, with measured temperatures of 491 to 544 °C (916 to 1,011 °F).
- Iron oxide lavas are thought to be the source of the iron ore at Kiruna, Sweden which formed during the Proterozoic. Iron oxide lavas of Pliocene age occur at the El Laco volcanic complex on the Chile-Argentina border. Iron oxide lavas are thought to be the result of immiscible separation of iron oxide magma from a parental magma of calc-alkaline or alkaline composition. (Some geologists, however, interpret the El Laco iron oxide rocks as silicate lava flows that have been hydrothermally altered after their eruption).
- Sulfur lava flows up to 250 metres (820 feet) long and 10 metres (33 feet) wide occur at Lastarria volcano, Chile. They were formed by the melting of sulfur deposits at temperatures as low as 113 °C (235 °F).

The term "lava" can also be used to refer to molten "ice mixtures" in eruptions on the icy satellites of the Solar System's giant planets.

=== Rheology ===
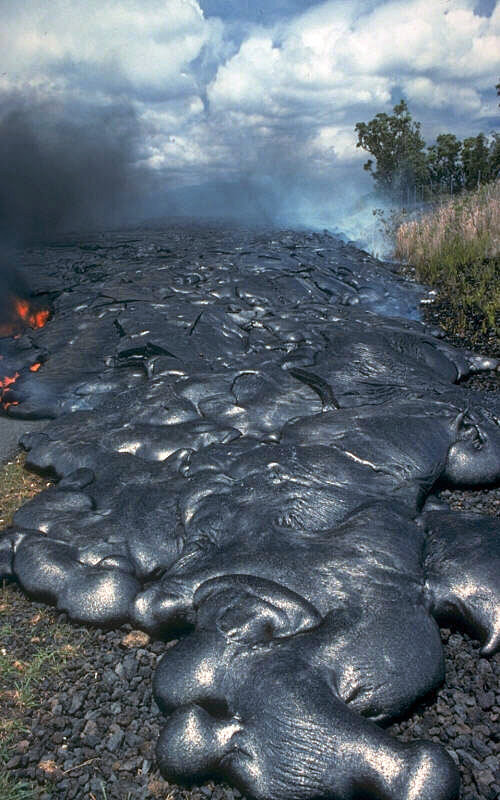
Toes of a pāhoehoe advance across a road in Kalapana on the east rift zone of Kīlauea Volcano in Hawaii, United States

The lava's viscosity mostly determines the behavior of lava flows. While the temperature of common silicate lava ranges from about 800 °C (1,470 °F) for felsic lavas to 1,200 °C (2,190 °F) for mafic lavas, its viscosity ranges over seven orders of magnitude, from 10^{11} cP (10^{8} Pa⋅s) for felsic lavas to 10^{4} cP (10 Pa⋅s) for mafic lavas. Lava viscosity is mostly determined by composition but also depends on temperature and shear rate.

Lava viscosity determines the kind of volcanic activity that takes place when the lava is erupted. The greater the viscosity, the greater the tendency for eruptions to be explosive rather than effusive. As a result, most lava flows on Earth, Mars, and Venus are composed of basalt lava. On Earth, 90% of lava flows are mafic or ultramafic, with intermediate lava making up 8% of flows and felsic lava making up just 2% of flows. Viscosity also determines the aspect (thickness relative to lateral extent) of flows, the speed with which flows move, and the surface character of the flows.

When highly viscous lavas erupt effusively rather than in their more common explosive form, they almost always erupt as high-aspect flows or domes. These flows take the form of block lava rather than ʻaʻā or pāhoehoe. Obsidian flows are common. Intermediate lavas tend to form steep stratovolcanoes, with alternating beds of lava from effusive eruptions and tephra from explosive eruptions. Mafic lavas form relatively thin flows that can move great distances, forming shield volcanoes with gentle slopes.

In addition to melted rock, most lavas contain solid crystals of various minerals, fragments of exotic rocks known as xenoliths, and fragments of previously solidified lava. The crystal content of most lavas gives them thixotropic and shear thinning properties. In other words, most lavas do not behave like Newtonian fluids, in which the rate of flow is proportional to the shear stress. Instead, a typical lava is a Bingham fluid, which shows considerable resistance to flow until a stress threshold, called the yield stress, is crossed. This results in plug flow of partially crystalline lava. A familiar example of plug flow is toothpaste squeezed out of a toothpaste tube. The toothpaste comes out as a semisolid plug, because shear is concentrated in a thin layer in the toothpaste next to the tube and only there does the toothpaste behave as a fluid. Thixotropic behavior also hinders crystals from settling out of the lava. Once the crystal content reaches about 60%, the lava ceases to behave like a fluid and begins to behave like a solid. Such a mixture of crystals with melted rock is sometimes described as crystal mush.

Lava flow speeds vary based primarily on viscosity and slope. In general, lava flows slowly, with typical speeds for Hawaiian basaltic flows of 0.40 km/h (0.25 mph) and maximum speeds of 10 to 48 km/h (6 to 30 mph) on steep slopes. An exceptional speed of 32 to 97 km/h (20 to 60 mph) was recorded following the collapse of a lava lake at Mount Nyiragongo. The scaling relationship for lavas is that the average speed of a flow scales as the square of its thickness divided by its viscosity. This implies that a rhyolite flow would have to be about a thousand times thicker than a basalt flow to flow at a similar speed.

=== Temperature ===
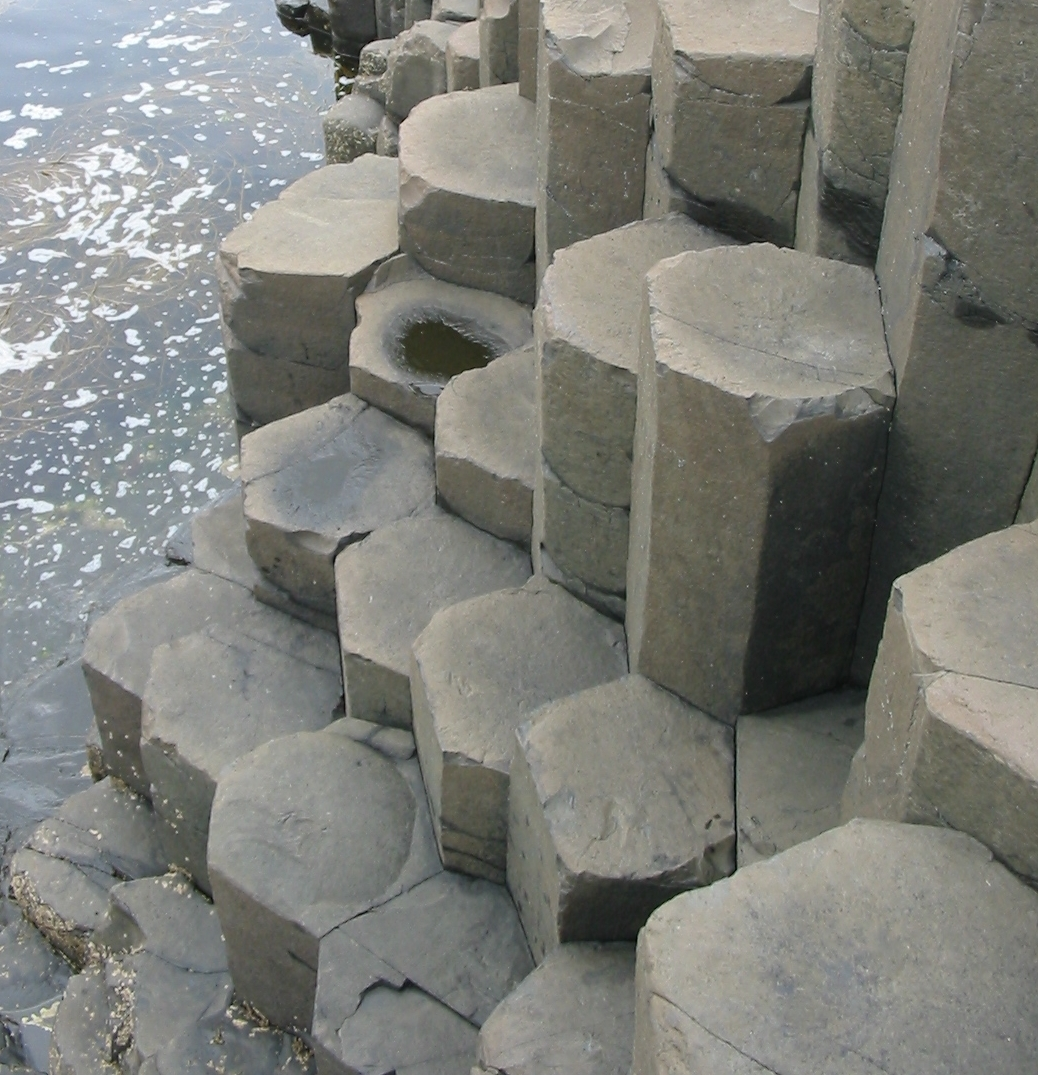
Columnar jointing in Giant's Causeway in Northern Ireland

The temperature of most types of molten lava ranges from about 800 °C (1,470 °F) to 1,200 °C (2,190 °F) depending on the lava's chemical composition. This temperature range is similar to the hottest temperatures achievable with a forced air charcoal forge. Lava is most fluid when first erupted, becoming much more viscous as its temperature drops.

Lava flows quickly develop an insulating crust of solid rock as a result of radiative loss of heat. Thereafter, the lava cools by a very slow conduction of heat through the rocky crust. For instance, geologists of the United States Geological Survey regularly drilled into the Kilauea Iki lava lake, formed in an eruption in 1959. After three years, the solid surface crust, whose base was at a temperature of 1,065 °C (1,949 °F), was still only 14 m (46 ft) thick, even though the lake was about 100 m (330 ft) deep. Residual liquid was still present at depths of around 80 m (260 ft) nineteen years after the eruption.

A cooling lava flow shrinks, and this fractures the flow. Basalt flows show a characteristic pattern of fractures. The uppermost parts of the flow show irregular downward-splaying fractures, while the lower part of the flow shows a very regular pattern of fractures that break the flow into five- or six-sided columns. The irregular upper part of the solidified flow is called the entablature, while the lower part that shows columnar jointing is called the colonnade. (The terms are borrowed from Greek temple architecture.) Likewise, regular vertical patterns on the sides of columns, produced by cooling with periodic fracturing, are described as chisel marks. Despite their names, these are natural features produced by cooling, thermal contraction, and fracturing.

As lava cools, crystallizing inwards from its edges, it expels gases to form vesicles at the lower and upper boundaries. These are described as pipe-stem vesicles or pipe-stem amygdales. Liquids expelled from the cooling crystal mush rise upwards into the still-fluid center of the cooling flow and produce vertical vesicle cylinders. Where these merge towards the top of the flow, they form sheets of vesicular basalt and are sometimes capped with gas cavities that sometimes fill with secondary minerals. The beautiful amethyst geodes found in the flood basalts of South America formed in this manner.

Flood basalts typically crystallize little before they cease flowing, and, as a result, flow textures are uncommon in less silicic flows. On the other hand, flow banding is common in felsic flows.

== Morphology ==
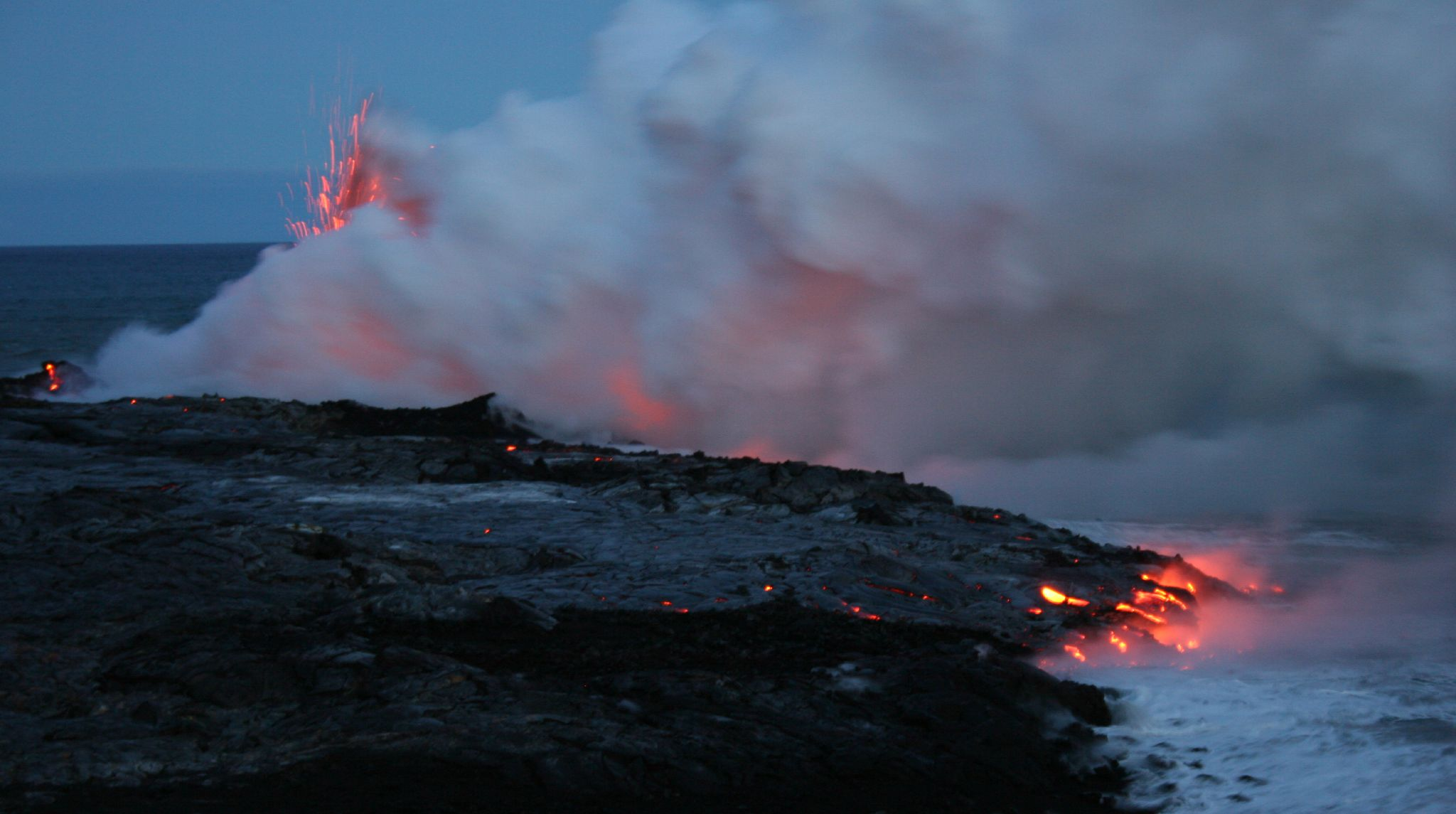
Lava entering the sea to expand the big island of Hawaii, Hawaiʻi Volcanoes National Park

The morphology of lava describes its surface form or texture. More fluid basaltic lava flows tend to form flat sheet-like bodies, whereas viscous rhyolite lava flows form knobbly, blocky masses of rock. Lava erupted underwater has its own distinctive characteristics.

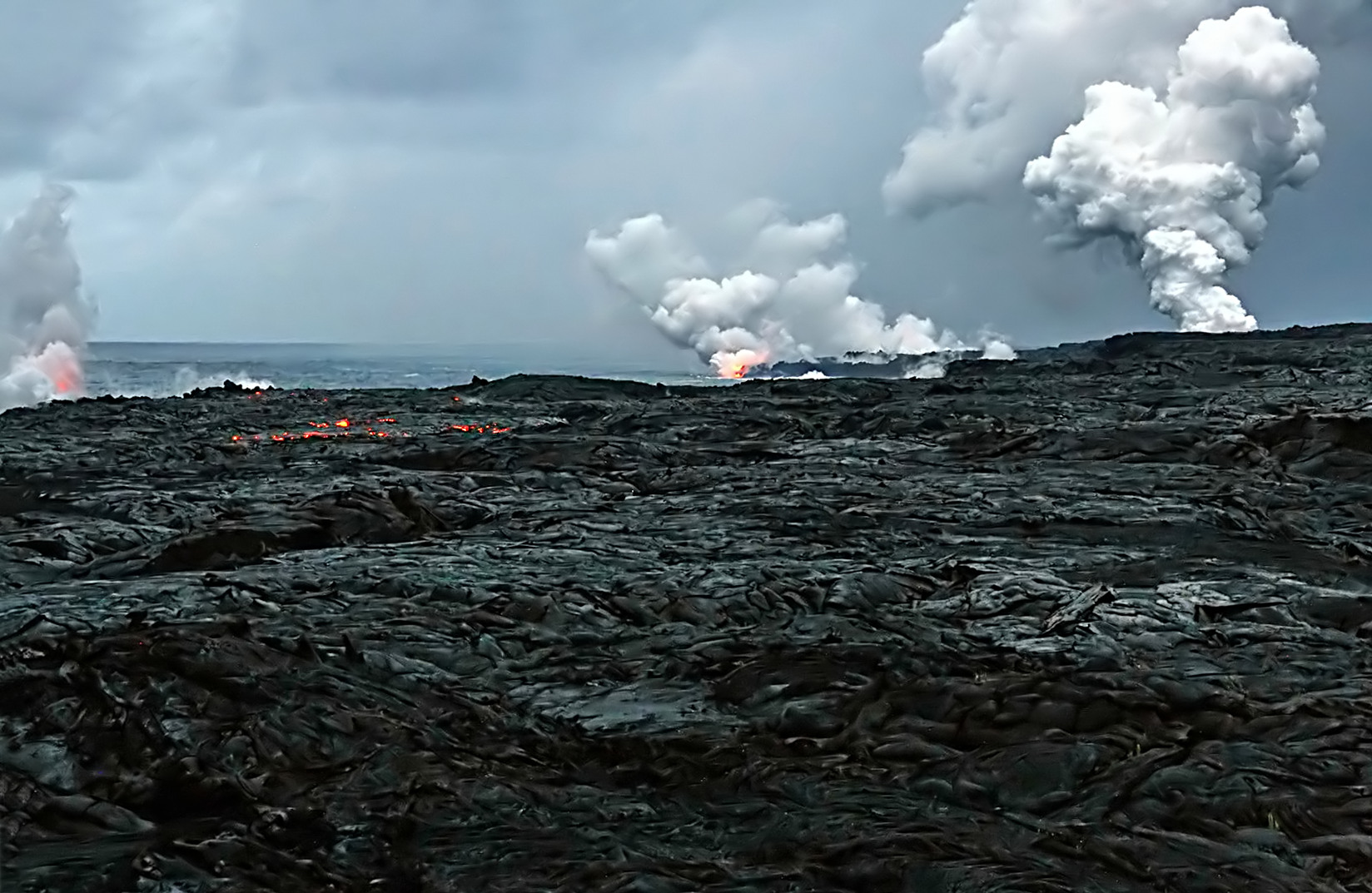
Lava enters the Pacific at the Big Island of Hawaii.

=== ʻAʻā ===
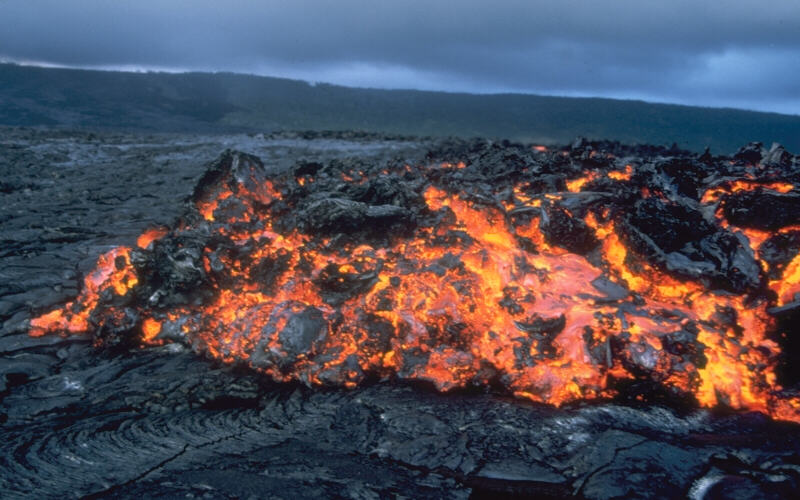
Glowing ʻaʻā flow front advancing over pāhoehoe on the coastal plain of Kīlauea in Hawaii, United States

ʻAʻā (also spelled aa, aʻa, ʻaʻa, and a-aa, and pronounced [ʔəˈʔaː] or /ˈɑː(ʔ)ɑː/) is one of three basic types of flow lava. ʻAʻā is basaltic lava characterized by a rough or rubbly surface composed of broken lava blocks called clinker. The word is Hawaiian meaning "stony rough lava", but also to "burn" or "blaze"; it was introduced as a technical term in geology by Clarence Dutton.

The loose, broken, and sharp, spiny surface of an ʻaʻā flow makes hiking difficult and slow. The clinkery surface actually covers a massive dense core, which is the most active part of the flow. As pasty lava in the core travels downslope, the clinkers are carried along at the surface. At the leading edge of an ʻaʻā flow, however, these cooled fragments tumble down the steep front and are buried by the advancing flow. This produces a layer of lava fragments both at the bottom and top of an ʻaʻā flow.

Accretionary lava balls as large as 3 metres (10 feet) are common on ʻaʻā flows. ʻAʻā is usually of higher viscosity than pāhoehoe. Pāhoehoe can turn into ʻaʻā if it becomes turbulent from meeting impediments or steep slopes.

The sharp, angled texture makes ʻaʻā a strong radar reflector, and can easily be seen from an orbiting satellite (bright on Magellan pictures).

ʻAʻā lavas typically erupt at temperatures of 1,050 to 1,150 °C (1,920 to 2,100 °F) or greater.

=== Pāhoehoe ===
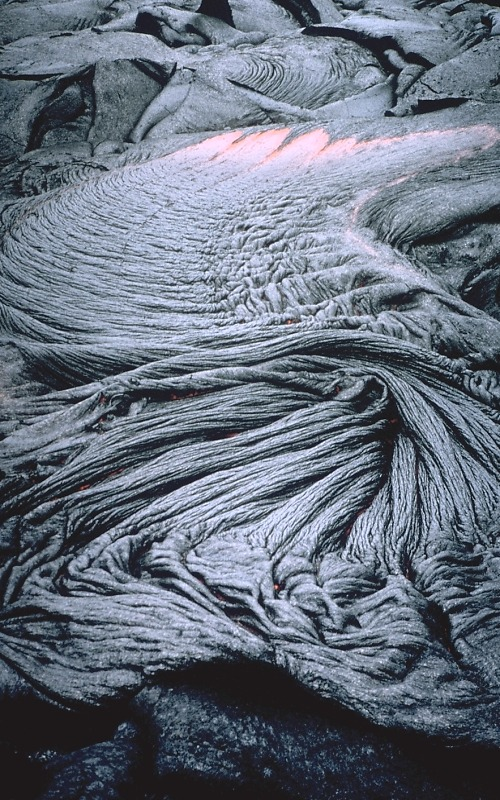
Pāhoehoe lava from Kīlauea volcano, Hawaii, United States

Pāhoehoe (also spelled pahoehoe, from Hawaiian [paːˈhoweˈhowe] meaning "smooth, unbroken lava") is basaltic lava that has a smooth, billowy, undulating, or ropy surface. These surface features are due to the movement of very fluid lava under a congealing surface crust. The Hawaiian word was introduced as a technical term in geology by Clarence Dutton.

A pāhoehoe flow typically advances as a series of small lobes and toes that continually break out from a cooled crust. It also forms lava tubes where the minimal heat loss maintains a low viscosity. The surface texture of pāhoehoe flows varies widely, displaying all kinds of bizarre shapes often referred to as lava sculpture. With increasing distance from the source, pāhoehoe flows may change into ʻaʻā flows in response to heat loss and consequent increase in viscosity. Experiments suggest that the transition takes place at a temperature between 1,200 and 1,170 °C (2,190 and 2,140 °F), with some dependence on shear rate. Pahoehoe lavas typically have a temperature of 1,100 to 1,200 °C (2,010 to 2,190 °F).

On the Earth, most lava flows are less than 10 km (6.2 mi) long, but some pāhoehoe flows are more than 50 km (31 mi) long. Some flood basalt flows in the geologic record extend for hundreds of kilometres.

The rounded texture makes pāhoehoe a poor radar reflector, and is difficult to see from an orbiting satellite (dark on Magellan picture).

=== Blocks ===
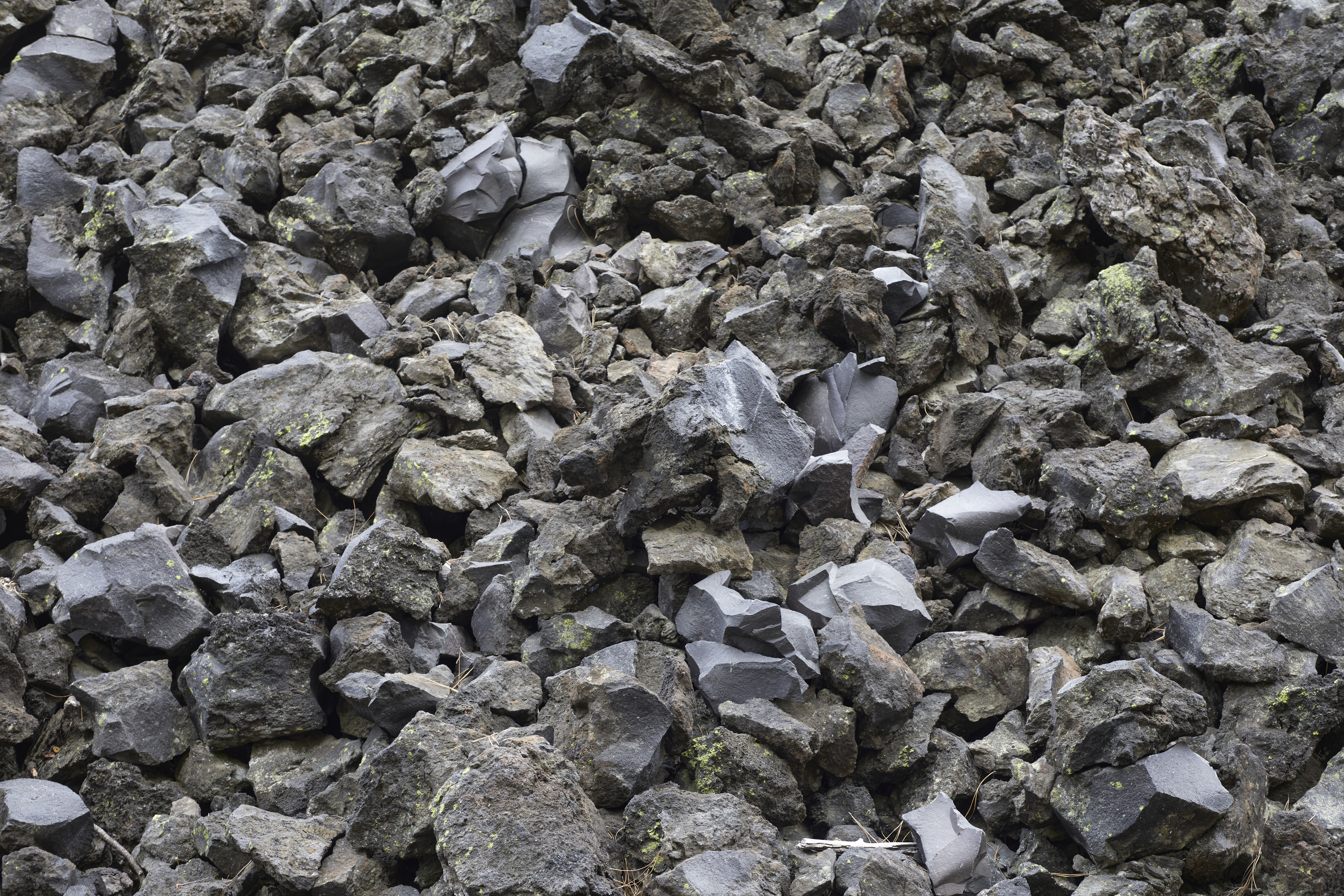
Block lava at Fantastic Lava Beds near Cinder Cone in Lassen Volcanic National Park

Block lava flows are typical of andesitic lavas from stratovolcanoes. They behave in a similar manner to ʻaʻā flows but their more viscous nature causes the surface to be covered in smooth-sided angular fragments (blocks) of solidified lava instead of clinkers. As with ʻaʻā flows, the molten interior of the flow, which is kept insulated by the solidified blocky surface, advances over the rubble that falls off the flow front. They also move much more slowly downhill and are thicker in depth than ʻaʻā flows.

=== Pillows ===
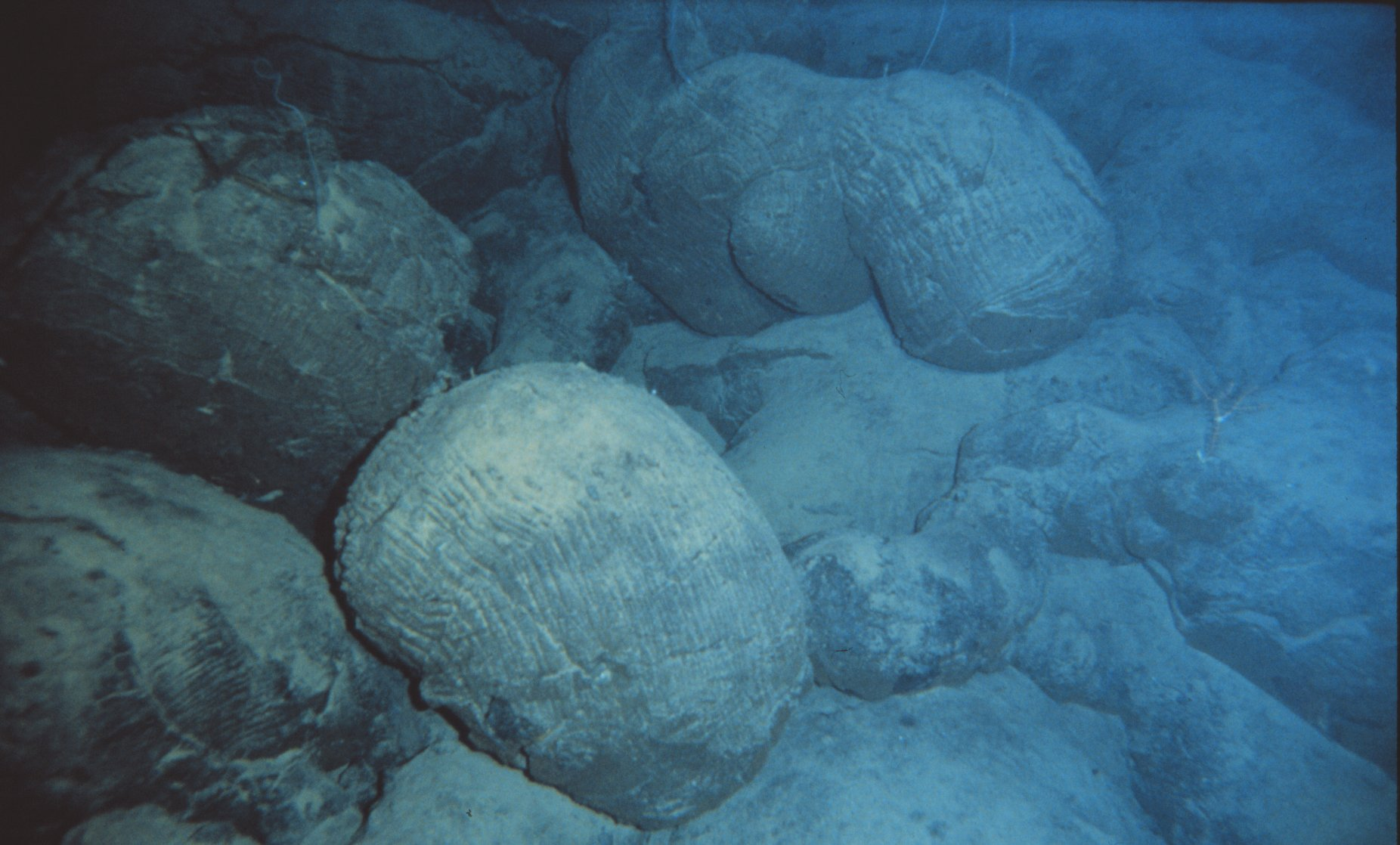
Pillow lava on the ocean floor near Hawaii

Pillow lava is the lava structure typically formed when lava emerges from an underwater volcanic vent or subglacial volcano or a lava flow enters the ocean. The viscous lava gains a solid crust on contact with the water, and this crust cracks and oozes additional large blobs or "pillows" as more lava emerges from the advancing flow. Since water covers the majority of Earth's surface and most volcanoes are situated near or under bodies of water, pillow lava is very common.

== Landforms ==
Because it is formed from viscous molten rock, lava flows and eruptions create distinctive formations, landforms and topographical features from the macroscopic to the microscopic.

=== Volcanoes ===
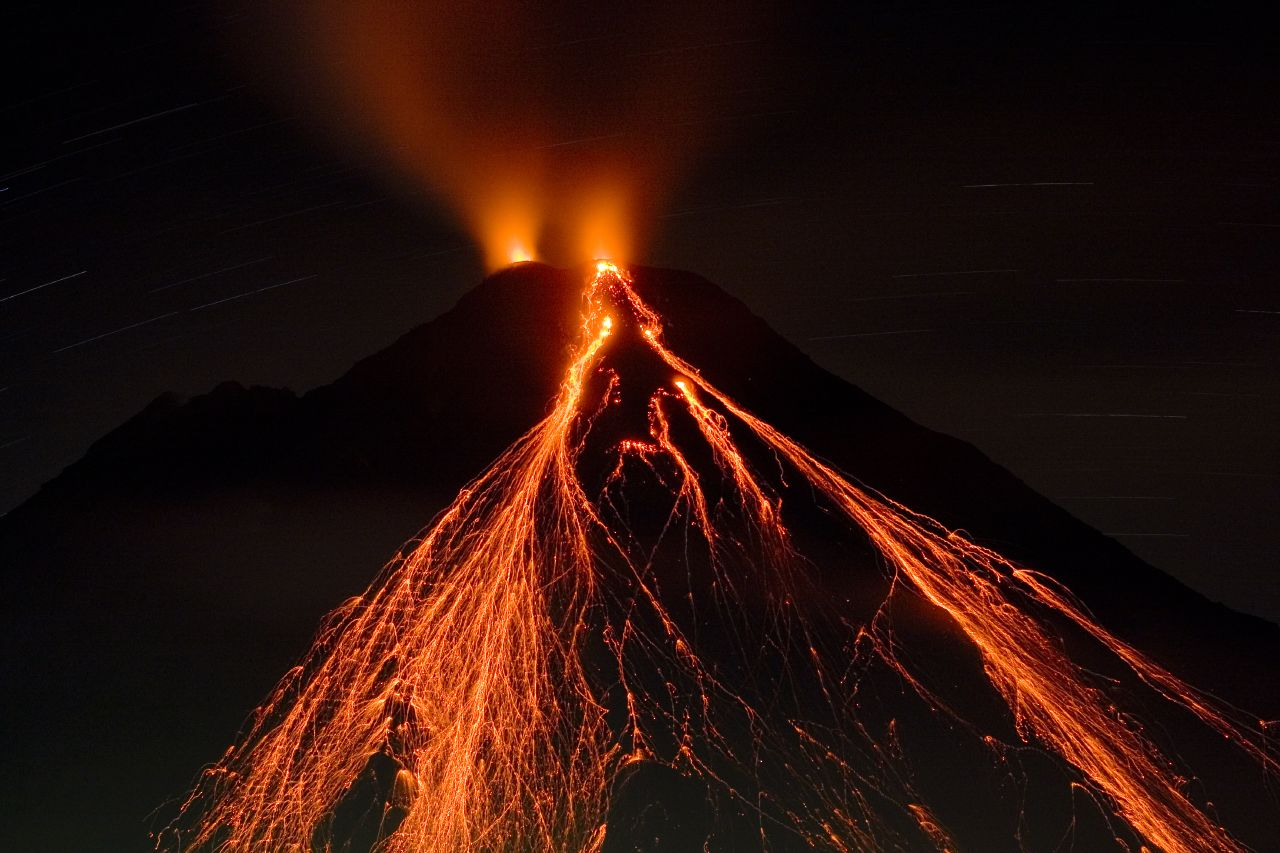
Arenal Volcano, Costa Rica, is a stratovolcano.

Volcanoes are the primary landforms built by repeated eruptions of lava and ash over time. They range in shape from shield volcanoes with broad, shallow slopes formed from predominantly effusive eruptions of relatively fluid basaltic lava flows, to steeply-sided stratovolcanoes (also known as composite volcanoes) made of alternating layers of ash and more viscous lava flows typical of intermediate and felsic lavas.

A caldera, which is a large subsidence crater, can form in a stratovolcano, if the magma chamber is partially or wholly emptied by large explosive eruptions; the summit cone no longer supports itself and thus collapses in on itself afterwards. Such features may include volcanic crater lakes and lava domes after the event. However, calderas can also form by non-explosive means such as gradual magma subsidence. This is typical of many shield volcanoes.

=== Cinder and spatter cones ===
Cinder cones and spatter cones are small-scale features formed by lava accumulation around a small vent on a volcanic edifice. Cinder cones are formed from tephra or ash and tuff which is thrown from an explosive vent. Spatter cones are formed by accumulation of molten volcanic slag and cinders ejected in a more liquid form.

=== Kīpukas ===
Another Hawaiian English term derived from the Hawaiian language, a kīpuka denotes an elevated area such as a hill, ridge or old lava dome inside or downslope from an area of active volcanism. New lava flows will cover the surrounding land, isolating the kīpuka so that it appears as a (usually) forested island in a barren lava flow.

=== Lava domes and coulées ===
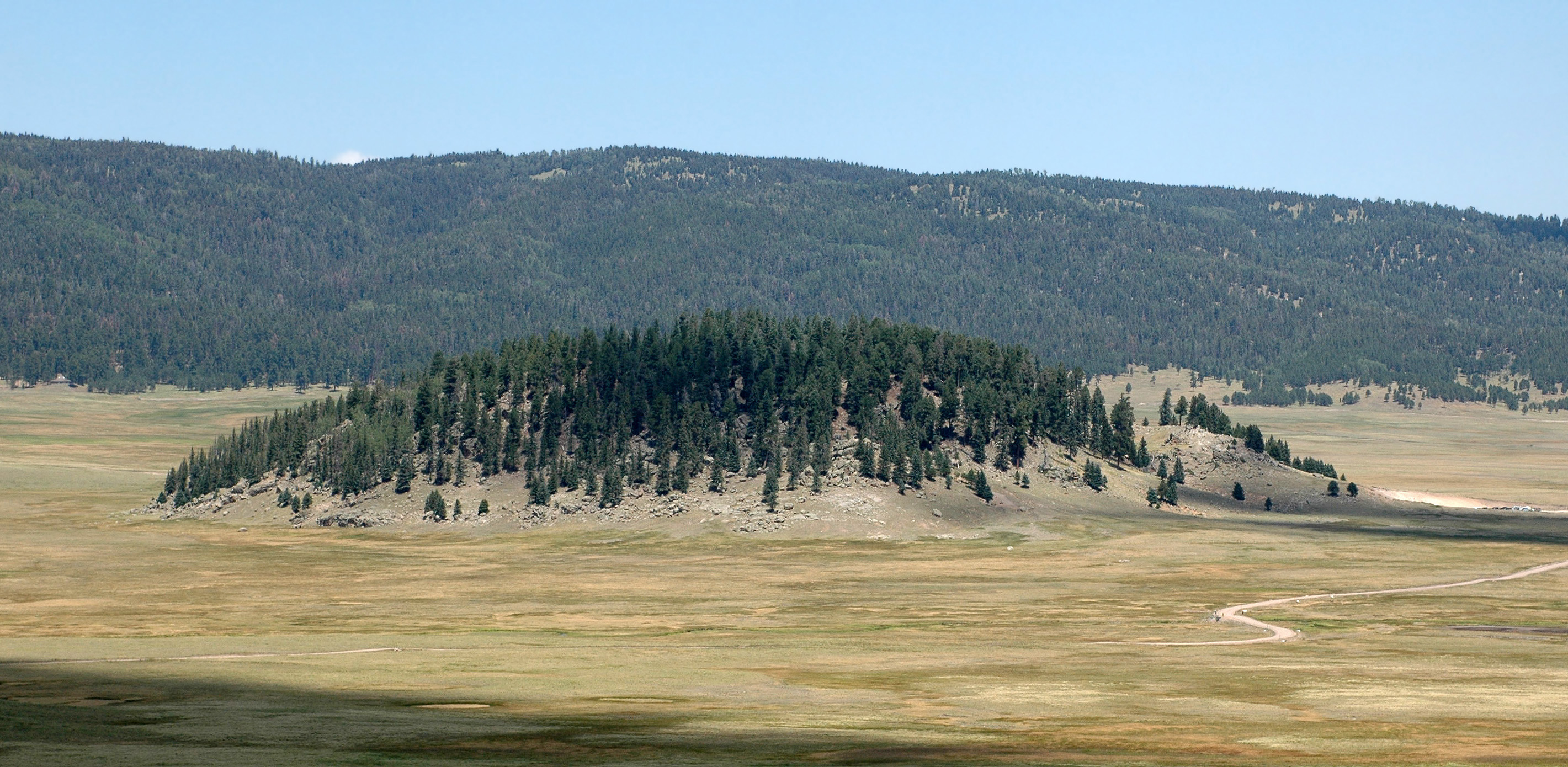
A forested lava dome in the midst of the Valle Grande, the largest meadow in the Valles Caldera National Preserve, New Mexico, United States

Lava domes are formed by the extrusion of viscous felsic magma. They can form prominent rounded protuberances, such as at Valles Caldera. As a volcano extrudes silicic lava, it can form an inflation dome or endogenous dome, gradually building up a large, pillow-like structure which cracks, fissures, and may release cooled chunks of rock and rubble. The top and side margins of an inflating lava dome tend to be covered in fragments of rock, breccia and ash.

Examples of lava dome eruptions include the Novarupta dome, and successive lava domes of Mount St Helens.

When a dome forms on an inclined surface it can flow in short thick flows called coulées (dome flows). These flows often travel only a few kilometres from the vent.

=== Lava tubes ===
Lava tubes are formed when a flow of relatively fluid lava cools on the upper surface sufficiently to form a crust. Beneath this crust, which being made of rock is an excellent insulator, the lava can continue to flow as a liquid. When this flow occurs over a prolonged period of time the lava conduit can form a tunnel-like aperture or lava tube, which can conduct molten rock many kilometres from the vent without cooling appreciably. Often these lava tubes drain out once the supply of fresh lava has stopped, leaving a considerable length of open tunnel within the lava flow.

Lava tubes are known from the modern day eruptions of Kīlauea, and significant, extensive and open lava tubes of Tertiary age are known from North Queensland, Australia, some extending for 15 kilometres (9 miles).

=== Lava lakes ===
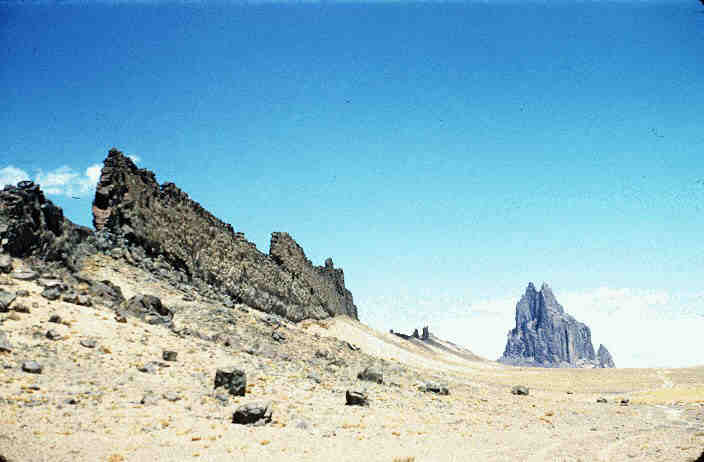
Shiprock, New Mexico, United States: a volcanic neck in the distance, with a radiating dike on its south side

Rarely, a volcanic cone may fill with lava but not erupt. Lava which pools within the caldera is known as a lava lake. Lava lakes do not usually persist for long, either draining back into the magma chamber once pressure is relieved (usually by venting of gases through the caldera), or by draining via eruption of lava flows or pyroclastic explosion.

There are only a few sites in the world where permanent lakes of lava exist. These include:

- Mount Erebus, Antarctica
- Erta Ale, Ethiopia
- Nyiragongo, Democratic Republic of Congo
- Ambrym, Vanuatu.

=== Lava delta ===
Lava deltas form wherever sub-aerial flows of lava enter standing bodies of water. The lava cools and breaks up as it encounters the water, with the resulting fragments filling in the seabed topography such that the sub-aerial flow can move further offshore. Lava deltas are generally associated with large-scale, effusive type basaltic volcanism.

== Lava fountains ==
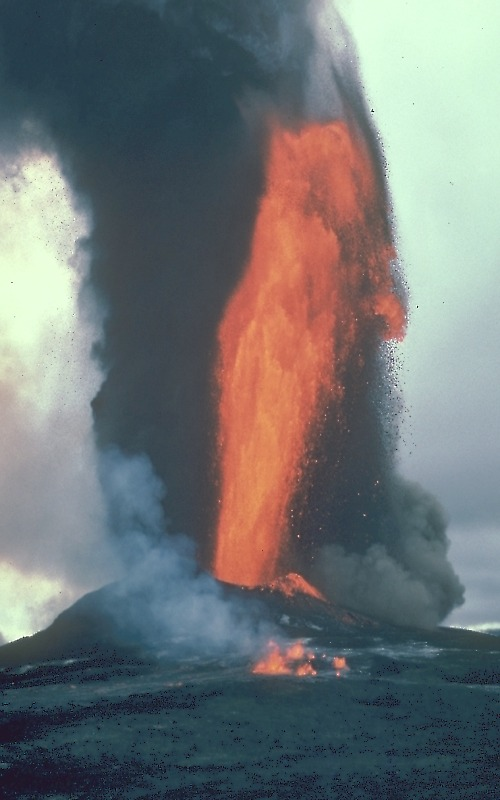
Lava fountain at Kīlauea

A lava fountain is a volcanic phenomenon in which lava is forcefully but non-explosively ejected from a crater, vent, or fissure. The highest lava fountain recorded was during the 23 November 2013 eruption of Mount Etna in Italy, which reached a stable height of around 2,500 m (8,200 ft) for 18 minutes, briefly peaking at a height of 3,400 m (11,000 ft). Lava fountains may occur as a series of short pulses, or a continuous jet of lava. They are commonly associated with Hawaiian eruptions.

== Hazards ==
Lava flows are enormously destructive to property in their path. However, casualties are rare since flows are usually slow enough for people and animals to escape, though this is dependent on the viscosity of the lava. Nevertheless, injuries and deaths have occurred, either because they had their escape route cut off, because they got too close to the flow or, more rarely, if the lava flow front travels too quickly. This notably happened during the eruption of Nyiragongo in Zaire (now Democratic Republic of the Congo). On the night of 10 January 1977, a crater wall was breached and a fluid lava lake drained out in under an hour. The resulting flow sped down the steep slopes at up to 100 km/h (62 mph), and overwhelmed several villages while residents were asleep. As a result of this disaster, the mountain was designated a Decade Volcano in 1991.

Deaths attributed to volcanoes frequently have a different cause. For example, volcanic ejecta, pyroclastic flow from a collapsing lava dome, lahars, poisonous gases that travel ahead of lava, or explosions caused when the flow comes into contact with water. A particularly dangerous area is called a lava bench. This very young ground will typically break off and fall into the sea.

Areas of recent lava flows continue to represent a hazard long after the lava has cooled. Where young flows have created new lands, land is more unstable and can break off into the sea. Flows often crack deeply, forming dangerous chasms, and a fall against ʻaʻā lava is similar to falling against broken glass. Rugged hiking boots, long pants, and gloves are recommended when crossing lava flows.

Diverting a lava flow is extremely difficult, but it can be accomplished in some circumstances, as was once partially achieved in Vestmannaeyjar, Iceland. The optimal design of simple, low-cost barriers that divert lava flows is an area of ongoing research.

=== Towns destroyed by lava flows ===
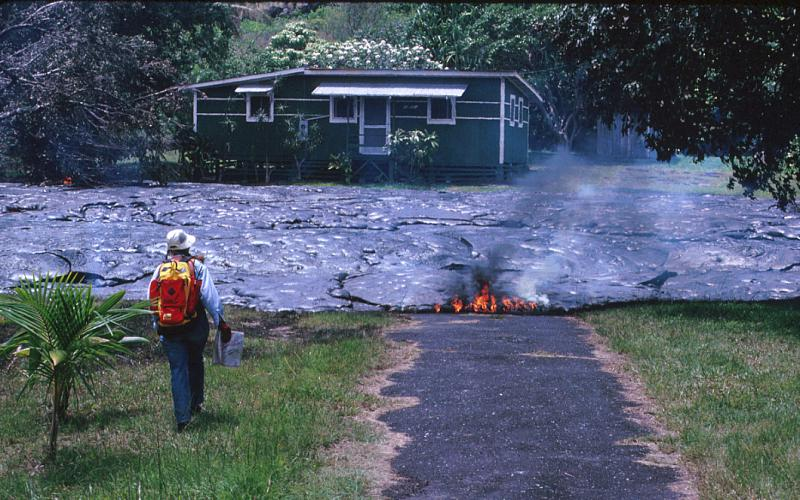
Lava can easily destroy entire towns. This picture shows one of over 100 houses destroyed by the lava flow in Kalapana, Hawaii, United States, in 1990.

- The Nisga'a villages of Lax Ksiluux and Wii Lax K'abit in northwestern British Columbia, Canada, were destroyed by thick lava flows during the eruption of Tseax Cone in the 1700s.
- Garachico on the island of Tenerife was destroyed by the eruption of Trevejo (1706) (rebuilt).
- Keawaiki, Hawaii, 1859 (abandoned)
- San Sebastiano al Vesuvio, Italy, destroyed in 1944 by the most recent eruption of Mount Vesuvius during the Allies' occupation of southern Italy (rebuilt)
- Koae and Kapoho, Hawaii, were both destroyed by the same eruption of Kīlauea in January, 1960 (abandoned).
- Kalapana, Hawaii, was destroyed by the eruption of the Kīlauea volcano in 1990 (abandoned).
- Kapoho, Hawaii, was largely inundated by lava in June 2018, with its subdivision Vacationland Hawaii being completely destroyed.

=== Towns damaged by lava flows ===
- Catania, Italy, in the 1669 Etna eruption (rebuilt)
- Sale'aula, Samoa, by eruptions of Mt Matavanu between 1905 and 1911
- Mascali, Italy, almost destroyed by the eruption of Mount Etna in 1928 (rebuilt)
- Parícutin (village after which the volcano was named) and San Juan Parangaricutiro, Mexico, by Parícutin from 1943 to 1952
- Heimaey, Iceland, in the 1973 Eldfell eruption (rebuilt)
- Piton Sainte-Rose, Reunion island, in 1977
- Royal Gardens, Hawaii, by the eruption of Kilauea in 1986–87 (abandoned)
- Goma, Democratic Republic of Congo, in the eruption of Nyiragongo in 2002
- Los Llanos de Aridane (Todoque neighbourhood) and El Paso (El Paraíso neighbourhood) on La Palma in the 2021 Cumbre Vieja volcanic eruption

=== Towns destroyed by tephra ===
Tephra is fragmental material, including solidified lava fragments, that has been ejected from a volcano during a volcanic eruption; it can take the form of volcanic ash, lapilli, volcanic bombs or volcanic blocks.

- Pompeii, Italy, in the eruption of Mount Vesuvius in 79 AD
- Herculaneum, Italy, in the eruption of Mount Vesuvius in 79 AD
- Akrotiri, on the Greek island of Santorini, was buried by pumice and ash from the Minoan eruption around 1600 BCE.
- Cerén, El Salvador, in the eruption of Ilopango between 410 and 535 AD
- Sumbawa Island, Indonesia, in the eruption of Mount Tambora in 1815
- Plymouth, Montserrat, in 1995. Plymouth was the capital and only port of entry for Montserrat and had to be completely abandoned, along with over half of the island. It is still the de jure capital.

== See also ==
- Blue lava – Optical phenomenon resulting from burning sulfur
- Lava planet – Terrestrial planet with the surface covered by molten lava
- Laze (geology) – Acid haze formed when molten lava enters the cold ocean
- Vog – Air pollution resulting from volcanic gases reacting with the atmosphere
