= Historical eruptions in Tenerife =

Vulcan eruption of Tenerife

Relation of the eruptions of which one has historical record in the Island of Tenerife:

- 1341: First historical eruption according to references of Biscayan sailors who wrote it down in his diaries. This rash, however, is not considered a reliable reference.
- 1393-1394: Second historical eruption according to references of Biscayan sailors. It is not considered reliable.
- 1430: This eruption is only known by references of the Guanches. It took place in the area of the Orotava Valley, although it has not been located with exactitude.
- 1492: The eruption of Boca Cangrejo was seen by Christopher Columbus during his passage through the south of Tenerife towards the discovery of America.
- 1704-1705: It took place through three points of emission: Siete Fuentes, Fasnia and Montaña de Las Arenas.
- 1706: The eruption of Trevejo or of Garachico happened on 5 May, about 8 kilometers to the south of the Villa of Garachico.
- 1798: The eruption of Chahorra occurred in the Pico Viejo on 9 June 1798 and ended on 8 September that year.
- 1909: The eruption of Chinyero began on 18 November 1909 and lasted 10 days.
