= Lava delta =

Contact point of lava flow and water

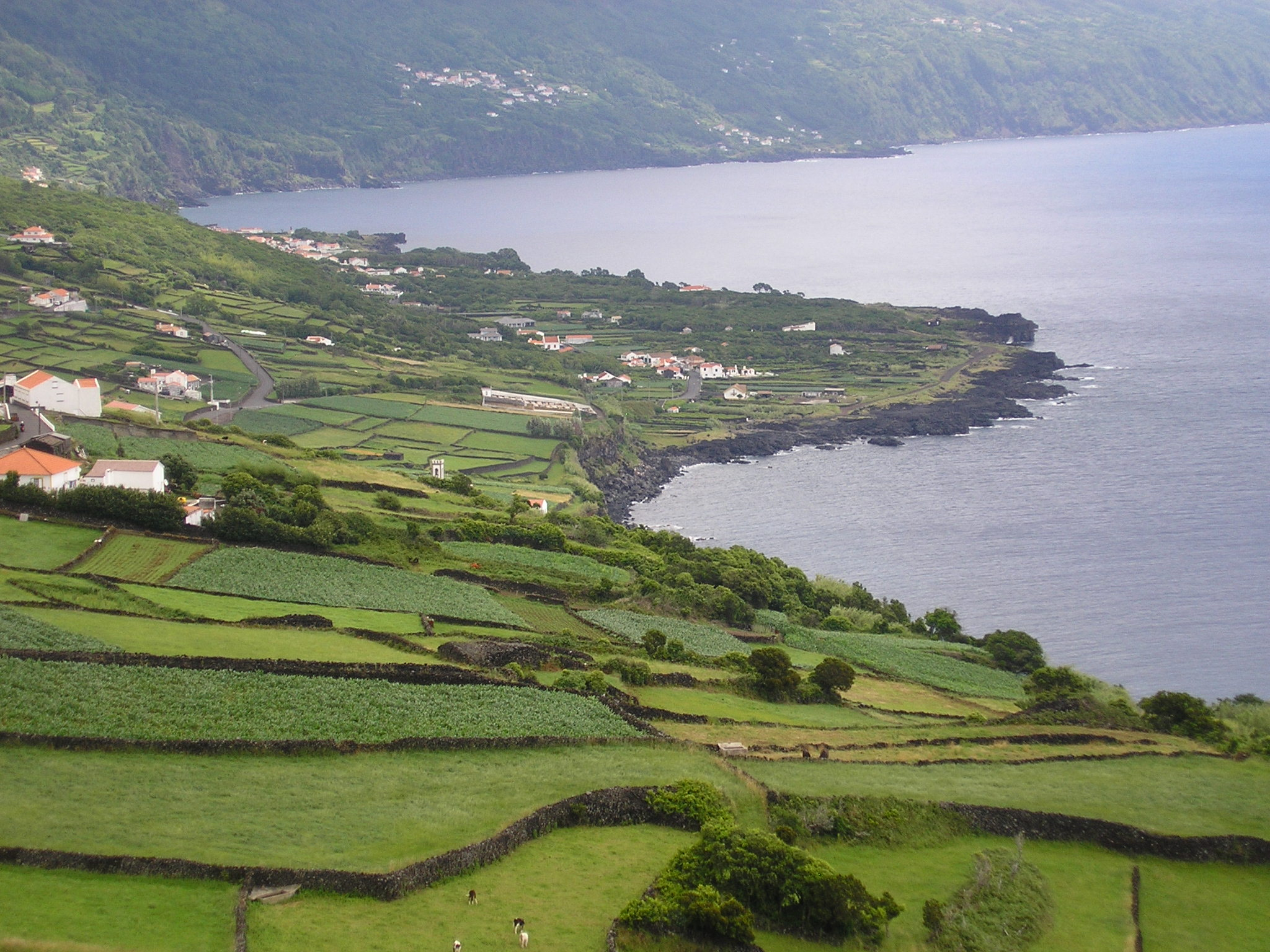
Lava delta of Ponta dos Biscoitos, Sant Cruz das Ribeiras, Pico Island

Lava deltas, similar to river deltas, form wherever sufficient sub-aerial flows of lava enter standing bodies of water. The lava cools and breaks up as it encounters the water, with the resulting fragments filling in the adjacent seabed topography such that the flow can move further offshore sub-aerially. Lava deltas are generally associated with large-scale, effusive type basaltic volcanism.

== Occurrence ==
Lava deltas are found mainly associated with volcanic islands, particularly those formed at hotspots as they produce the necessary effusive basaltic flows.

The largest lava delta systems known are associated with formation of volcanic type passive margins. Just prior to break-up along the northern Atlantic in the late Paleocene, massive eruptions occurred along the eventual line of break-up. This volcanism, part of the North Atlantic Igneous Province, led to the formation of two extensive lava escarpments, interpreted as deltas, extending from the Faeroes onto the More Margin (the Faeroe-Shetland escarpment) and the Vøring escarpment on the Vøring margin, a combined distance of approximately 1,000 km (620 mi). As these deltas were prograding into water of relatively constant depth, they were able to extend as much as 25 km (16 mi) from their original vents.

== Formation ==
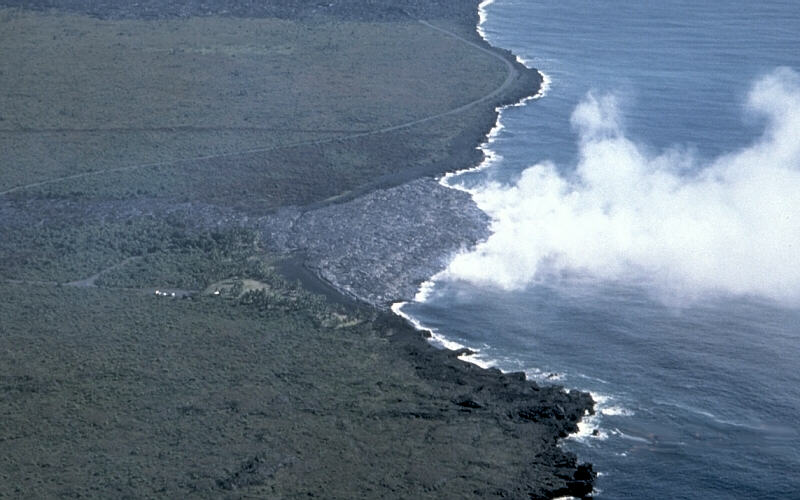
Aerial view of Kamoamoa lava delta forming, Kilauea

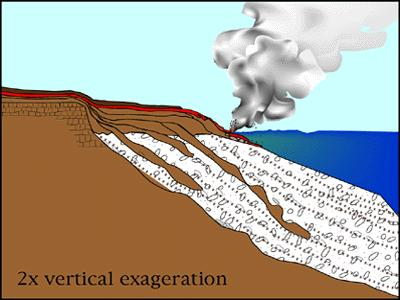
USGS cartoon of lava delta formation

When a sub-aerial lava flow reaches the ocean (or other large body of water), contact with the water causes both rapid cooling of the lava and steam explosions that fragment it. The glassy fragments that are formed, known as hyaloclastites, fall down to the seabed forming foresets. As the seabed topography becomes infilled, the subaerial flow is able to build out. The process continues as long as the lava supply is maintained, creating a lava bench. A lava bench is a volcanic landform with a horizontal surface raised above the level of the surrounding area. The Hawaiian islands are an example of land that was formed this way, and the Big Island is currently still expanding due to lava benches. The Kilauea Volcano releases lava that flows down the slope of the volcano and eventually encounters the ocean; this lava flow hardens when it comes into contact with the significantly cooler water of the ocean and forms an unstable lava bench. Eventually, when the material beneath the lava bench stabilizes, it becomes stable land that has been added to the island.

Most lava deltas are formed by relatively low viscosity pāhoehoe type flows and the lava reaches the sea via a system of small lava tubes, their entry into the water being marked by a series of steam plumes.

== Hazards ==
Collapse of the frontal part of lava deltas is common during their formation, representing a hazard for any people that are watching from a solidified part of the delta and such areas are normally marked as dangerous. If a newly formed lava bench rests on sediments, it may pose hazards due to its extremely unstable structure. Oftentimes, these benches are so unstable that they collapse into the sea, exposing the water to the hot lava on the interior of the bench and releasing acres of land into the ocean. When the hot lava hits the water, violent explosions of steam can shoot large rocks and molten lava up to 300 feet (90 m) inland. These collapses are extremely dangerous because they can happen without warning, and anyone or anything on the bench will be caught in the collapse. For safety, people are advised not to walk on lava benches because of their unstable nature, and they must maintain a safe distance from the lava bench.

People standing too close to the edge of an active delta are not only at risk from being thrown in the water but from the steam explosions and the accompanying acidic clouds (laze) that result from the collapse as seawater comes into contact with the active lava tube system.

== Uses ==
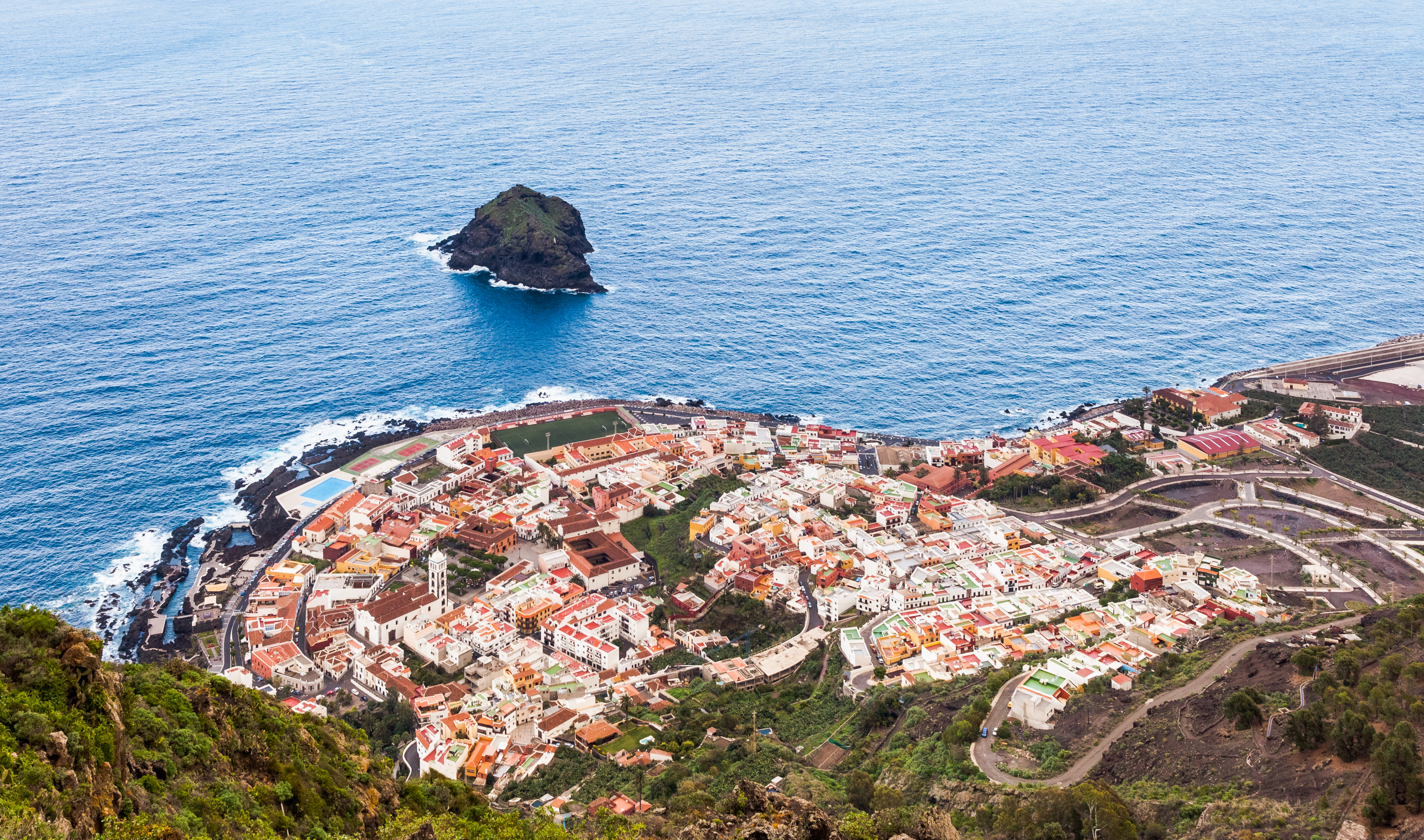
The town of Garachico, Tenerife, built on a lava delta formed during the 1706 eruption

On steep-sided volcanic islands, lava deltas make attractive sites for building and many villages and towns are located on old lava deltas, such as Garachico on Tenerife.

== See also ==
- Fajã
