= Roque de Garachico =

Rock islet in Spain

Coordinates: 28.3797°N 16.7626°W

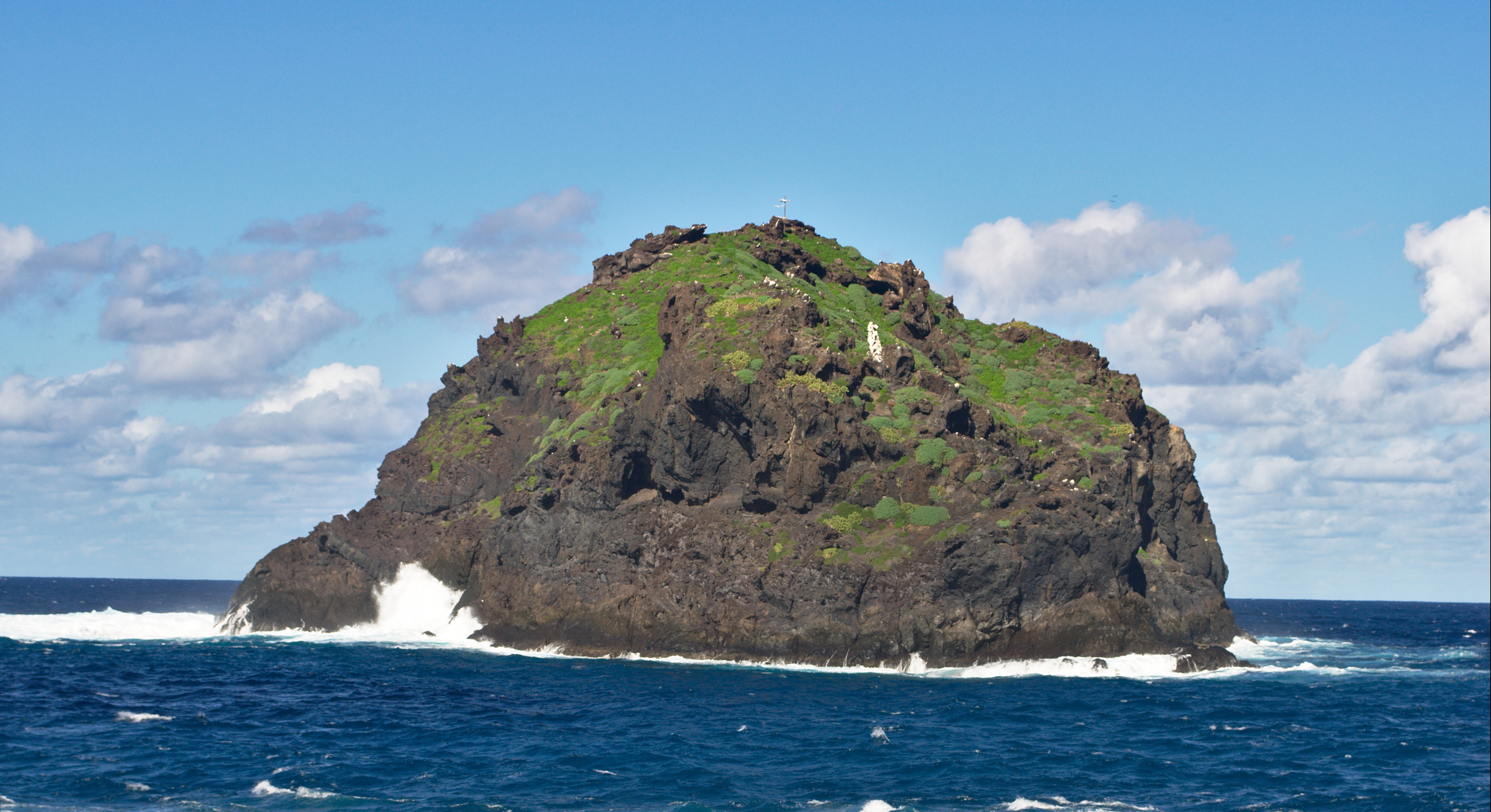
Roque de Garachico.

Roque de Garachico is a small island or roque located 300 metres (980 ft) off the north coast of the island of Tenerife (Canary Islands, Spain) belonging to the municipality of Garachico. It stretches 284 metres (932 ft) north-south, and is up to 169 metres (554 ft) wide, with an area of five hectares. It emerges steep out of the sea, with nearly vertical walls of rock in places, and reaches a height of 77 metres (253 ft). The area was protected in 1987.
