= Eruption of Trevejo =

Volcano eruption in Tenerife, Spain

Eruption of Trevejo (1706)
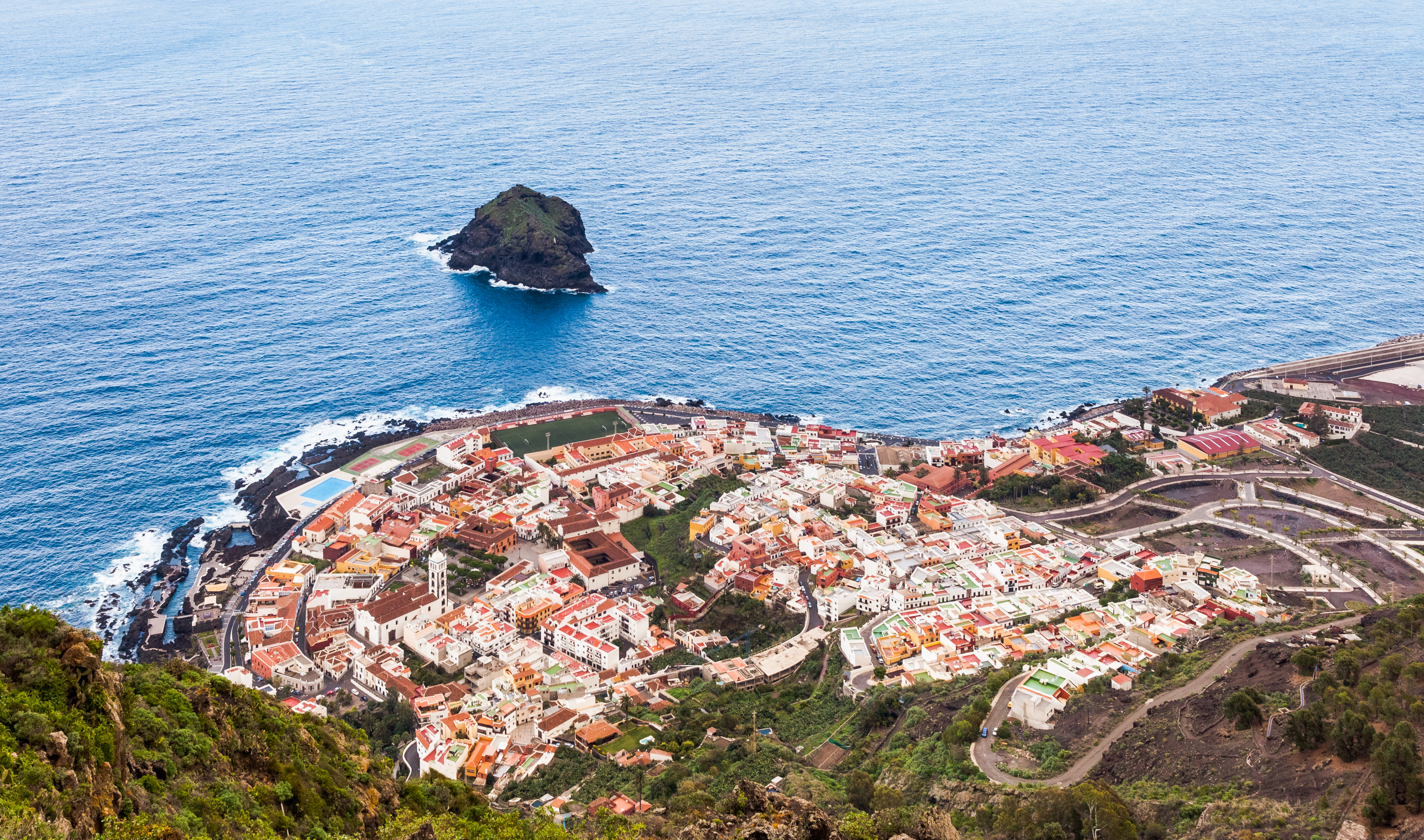
- The village of Garachico was built on a lava delta formed during the 1706 eruption.
- Volcano: Arenas Negras volcano or Trevejo volcano
- Start date: 5 May 1706
- End date: 14 May 1706
- Location: Tenerife, Canary Islands, Spain; 28°19′N 16°46′W
- VEI: 2

The eruption of the Trevejo volcano, also called the eruption of the Arenas Negras volcano, was a volcanic eruption that took place from 5 to 14 May 1706, about 8 km (5.0 mi) kilometers south of the Garachico in the north of the island of Tenerife (Spain). The eruption destroyed the old port of Garachico (the most important in Tenerife at the time) and ended the golden period of the town.

== History ==
In the seventeenth and eighteenth centuries, the port of Garachico was the most important commercial port on the island, with merchandise exchanges. From it sailed ships loaded with wine and sugar to America and Europe. The Village of Garachico was founded by the Genoese banker Cristóbal de Ponte after the conquest of Tenerife in 1496, making it a stately and prestigious villa. The town had been enriched thanks to its port that allowed palaces, haciendas, stately houses, rich convents and monasteries, as well as lavish churches. Garachico is one of the best preserved and representative historical-artistic hulls of the Canary Islands.

During the early hours of 5 May 1706, Trevejo volcano exploded and poured into the sea through the slope of a steep ravine due to the orography of the island. The eruption devastated the Village and, above all, the port of Garachico, which was completely covered. Seven lava flows descended the hillside, devastating and burying a large part of the town.

The Victorian writer Olivia Stone, on her trip to the Canary Islands in 1883, took testimony of the eruption and made a description of the event. However, it must be borne in mind that this is a narration of a very catastrophic tone and the eruption actually did not cause the total destruction of the city.

In the eruption there were no fatalities, as people were able to protect themselves. For example, during the eruption the nuns of the Monastery of the Immaculate Conception were evacuated and would not return until two years later, although the monastery itself was not damaged by the eruption.

The lava flows came to the sea, which curiously won the municipality extra territory, in addition to creating natural pools and puddles known as El Caletón. The eruption also affected part of the neighboring town of El Tanque although to a much smaller extent. The event ended on 13 June 1706.

== Consequences ==
The eruption of the Trevejo volcano is the volcanic phenomenon with the greatest economic and social impact on the island of Tenerife, despite being an event with a relatively low rate of explosiveness.

This eruption did not cause human losses, but it did affect the historical, economic and artistic development of Garachico, as it buried the old port and important architectural buildings in the municipality. For example, lava flows stopped at the foot of the church parish Church of Saint Anne; however, the castings were close enough that the heat burned part of the temple and had to be rebuilt between 1714 and 1721. The eruption also swept through the convents of Saint Didacus, Saint Clare and Saint Francis, as well as the House of the Count of La Gomera.

After this natural disaster, traders then used the dock of Puerto de la Cruz and Garachico remained as a small fishing port. This caused the international trade of the village to be suspended, contributing to its decline.

The Romanian philologist, historian and professor Alejandro Cioranescu, referred to the eruption of the Trevejo volcano and its consequences as the "Canarian Pompeii".

== See also ==
- Historical eruptions of Tenerife
