= Church of Santa Ana (Garachico) =

Church in Canary Islands, Spain

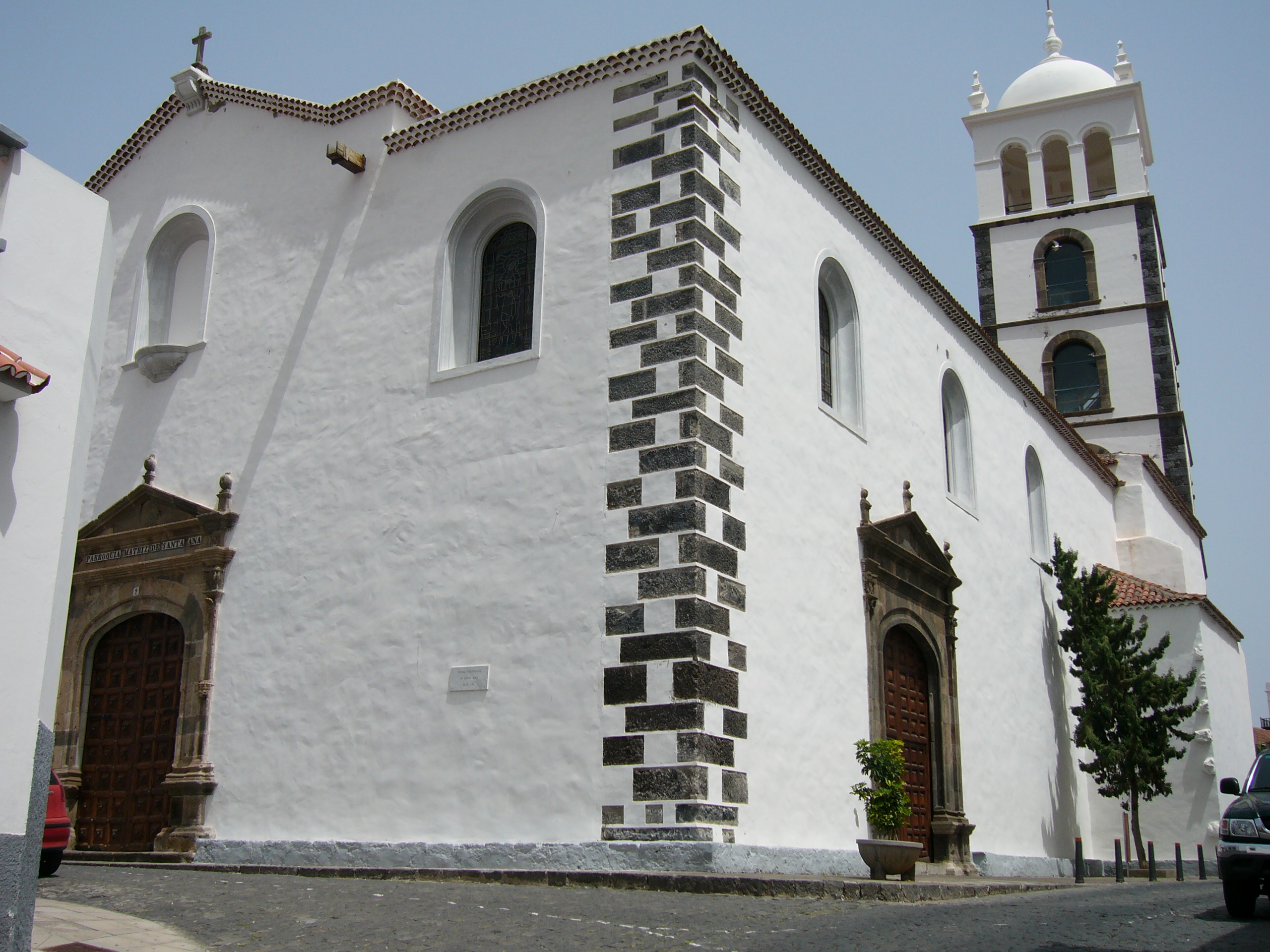

- Location within Tenerife

General information
- Type: church
- Location: Garachico, Province of Santa Cruz de Tenerife, Canary Islands, Spain
- Coordinates: 28°22′23″N 16°45′54″W
- Opened: c. 1520

The Church of Santa Ana (Spanish: Iglesia de Santa Ana) is the main church in Garachico, Tenerife. It is located next to the Plaza de la Libertad. Originally constructed around 1520, it was rebuilt after the volcanic eruption of 1706.

== History ==
In 1520, Cristobal de Ponte, the founder of Garachico, ceded a plot to construct the church. The dedication of the church to Saint Anne was inspired by his wife, Ana de Vergara. Construction of the chancel had started by 1532, and had been completed by 1542.

The Eruption of Trevejo (1706) severely affected the church, after which it was rebuilt between 1714 and 1721, with new walls and roofs, following the original plans.

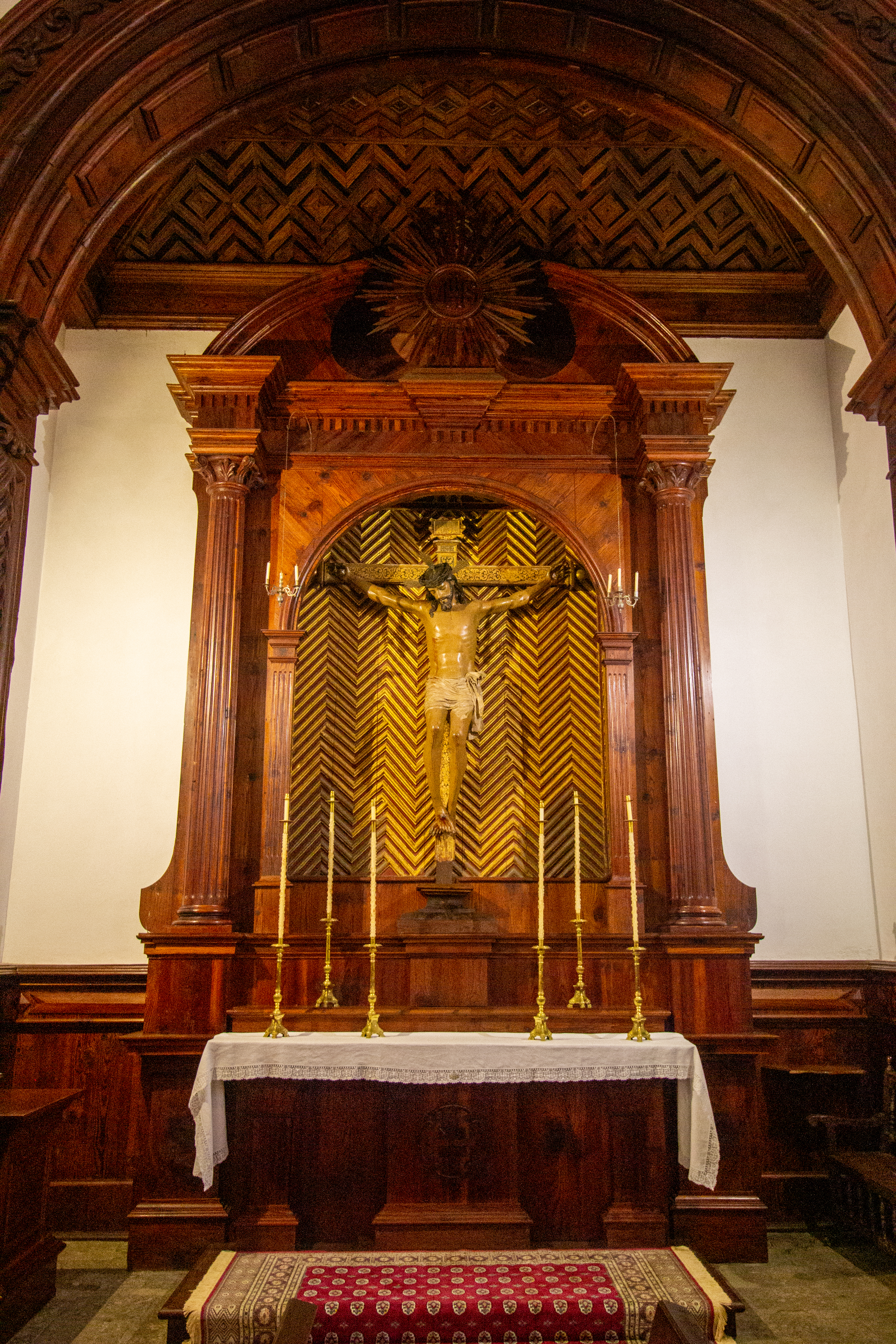
Image of Christ of Mercy

The church was restored in the 1990s. Three of its sculptures were restored in 2010. Work to restore the tower started in 2014, and included the repair of the wooden structure, the external stonework, the coatings and finishes, as well as the replacement of the electrical cabling and pavement, costing €253,000. It re-opened in 2016, after which it hosted several exhibitions.

It was registered as a monument of cultural interest by the Cabildo de Tenerife in 2010, and is part of a group listing (conjunto historico) of properties of cultural interest in Garachico.

== Design and contents ==
The facade combines elements from Plateresque and Renaissance architecture. The interior is divided into three parts, with a series of arches and columns. (In Spanish one says there are three naves; in English a nave and two side-aisles). There are a number of different altars, some of which are Baroque, as well as sculptures and paintings.

The church houses an image of Christ of Mercy from Mexico, made using the marrow of corn, and a baptismal font made of marble in the 17th century.

It also houses a museum of sacred art.
