= Port of Garachico =

Port

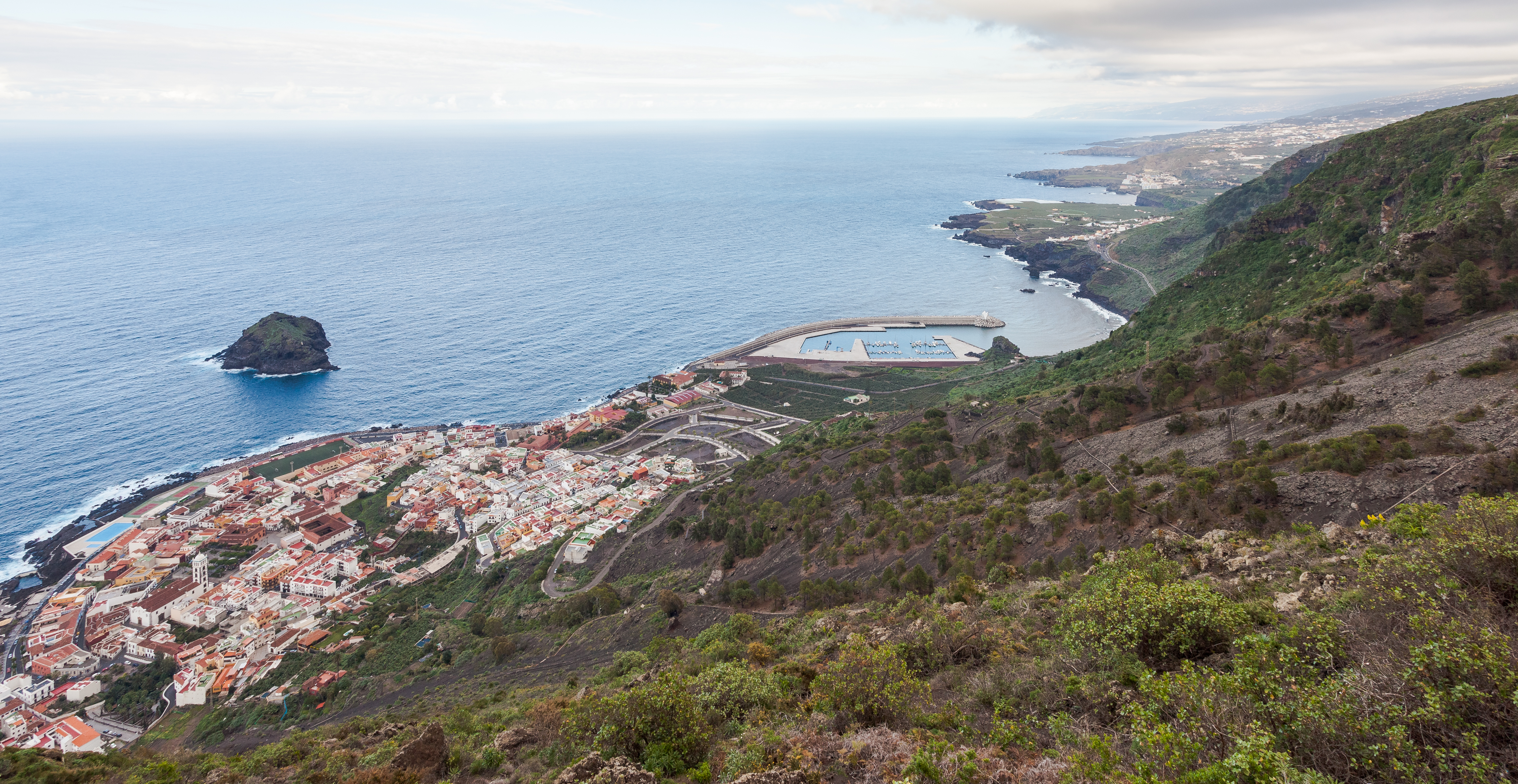
Port of Garachico

The Port of Garachico is a marina port located in the municipality of Garachico in the north of Tenerife, administered by the Port Authority of Santa Cruz de Tenerife.

== History ==
The old Port of Garachico was the most important on the island of Tenerife between the seventeenth and eighteenth centuries. It was a commercial port with regular exchanges of merchandise to America and Europe. In 1706, the eruption of the Trevejo volcano devastated and destroyed the port and with it the economic activity of the municipality. Afterwards, in 2012, the current port located next to the historic center was inaugurated.

== Characteristics ==
The Port of Garachico has 160 berths on pontoons for sports boats up to 15 meters in length and is protected from waves and currents by a dike 650 meters long.
