= Garachico =

- Municipality
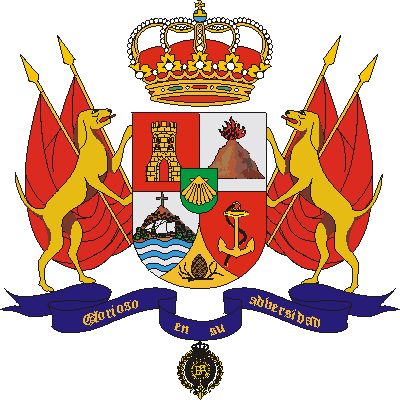
- Flag Coat of arms

- Municipal location in Tenerife

- Location of the town in Tenerife Garachico (Canary Islands) Garachico (Spain, Canary Islands)
- Coordinates: 28°22′20″N 16°45′50″W
- Country: Spain
- Autonomous community: Canary Islands
- Province: Santa Cruz de Tenerife
- Island: Tenerife

Area
  - Total: 29.28 km^{2} (11.31 sq mi)
- Elevation: 10 m (33 ft)

Population (2025-01-01)
  - Total: 4,940
  - Density: 169/km^{2} (437/sq mi)
- Climate: Csa

Garachico is a municipality and town on the northern coast of Tenerife, about 52 km West of the capital Santa Cruz de Tenerife, 50 km from Tenerife North Airport and 67 km from Tenerife South Airport. The town itself nestles below a 500m+ (1500 ft) cliff.

The city of Garachico with its port was founded by a Jewish Genoan banker Cristóbal de Ponte after the conquest of Tenerife in 1496.

On 5 May 1706, the eruption originating from the northwest rift zone of the Trevejo volcano was a major event in the town's history. Before then, Garachico was an important port exporting Malmsey wine and other local produce. However, a several-week-long eruption poured lava into the old bay and effectively destroyed the town's livelihood. The town itself was partially destroyed. (Contrary to the 'Tourist trade' myth, which will tell you that the town was completely destroyed, except for the church where the townfolk took refuge.)

Garachico has always taken care of its environment and protected the most diverse cultural manifestations. For all these reasons, the Spanish government awarded the town the Gold Medal of Fine Arts, which was presented in 1980 by the King.

== Pictures ==
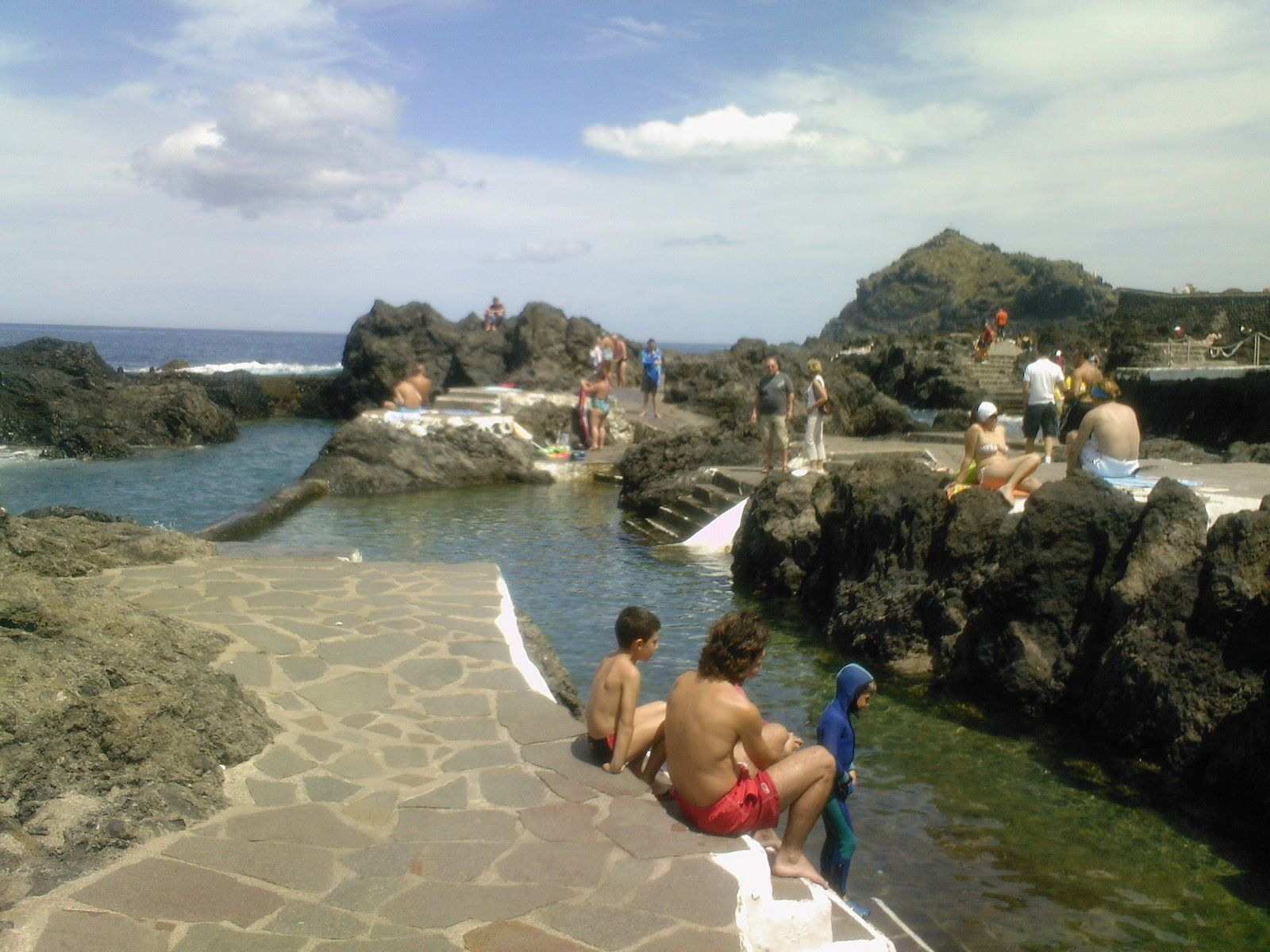
"piscinas"

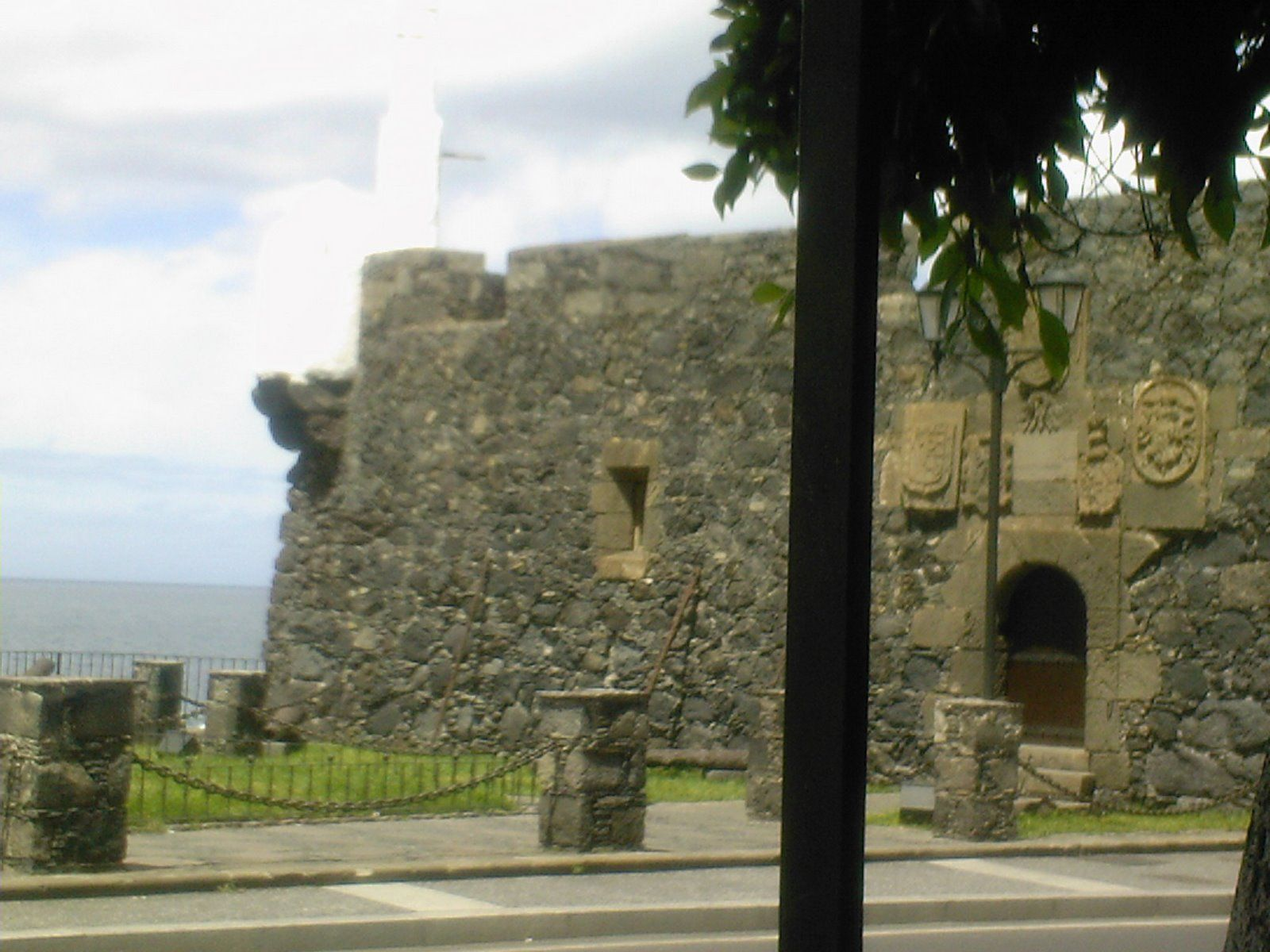
old buildings

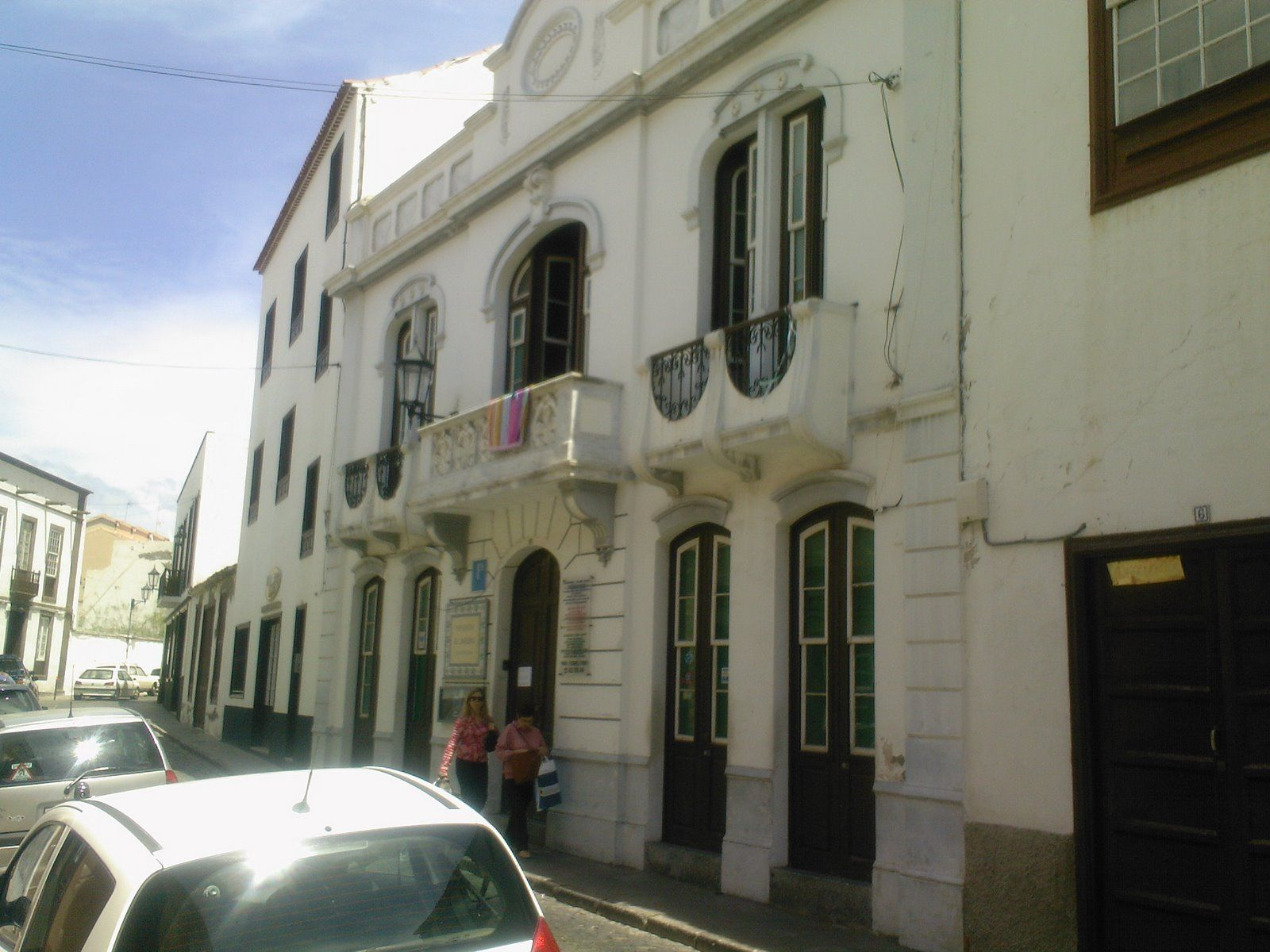
tiny street

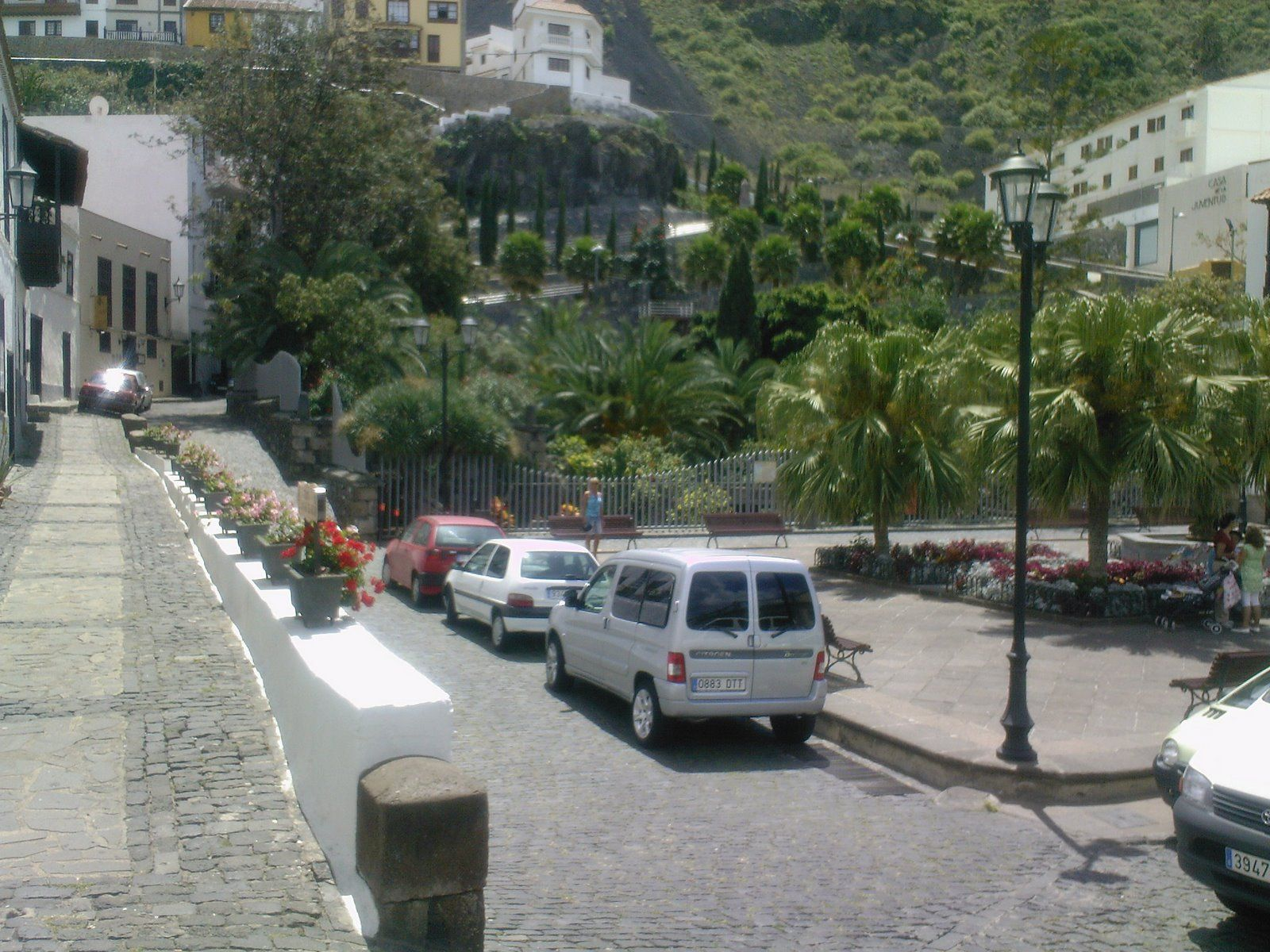
small park

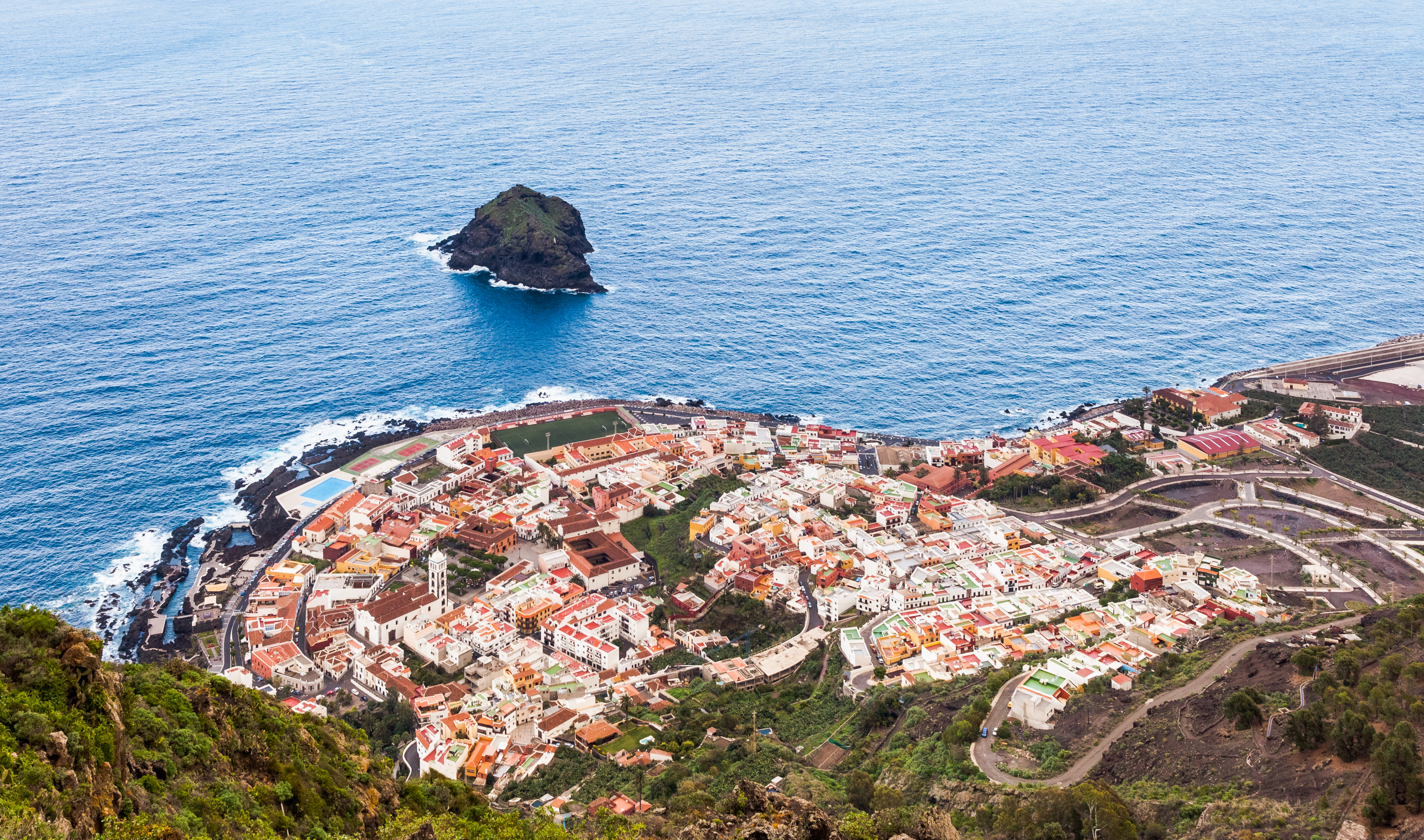
view

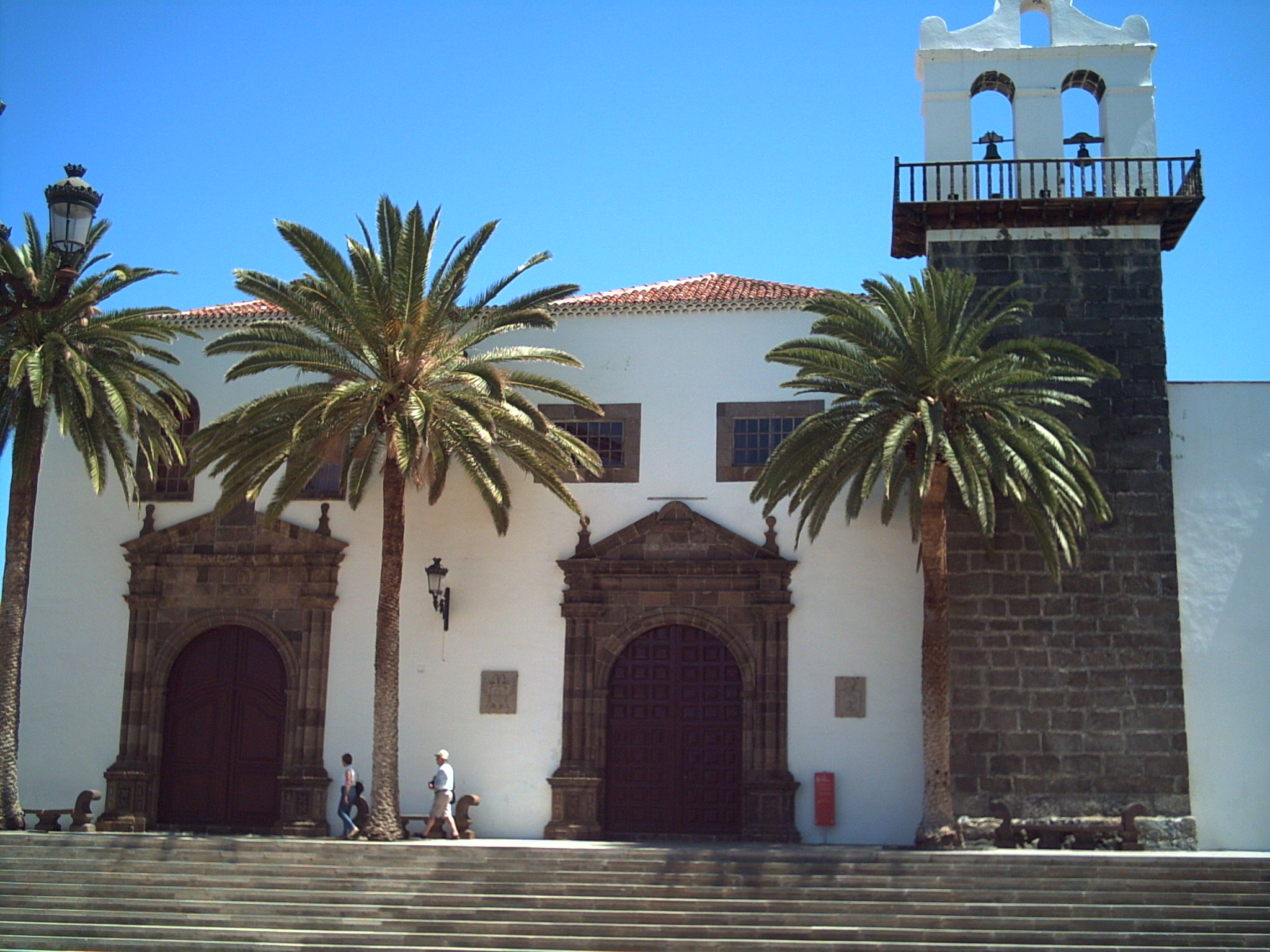
old buildings

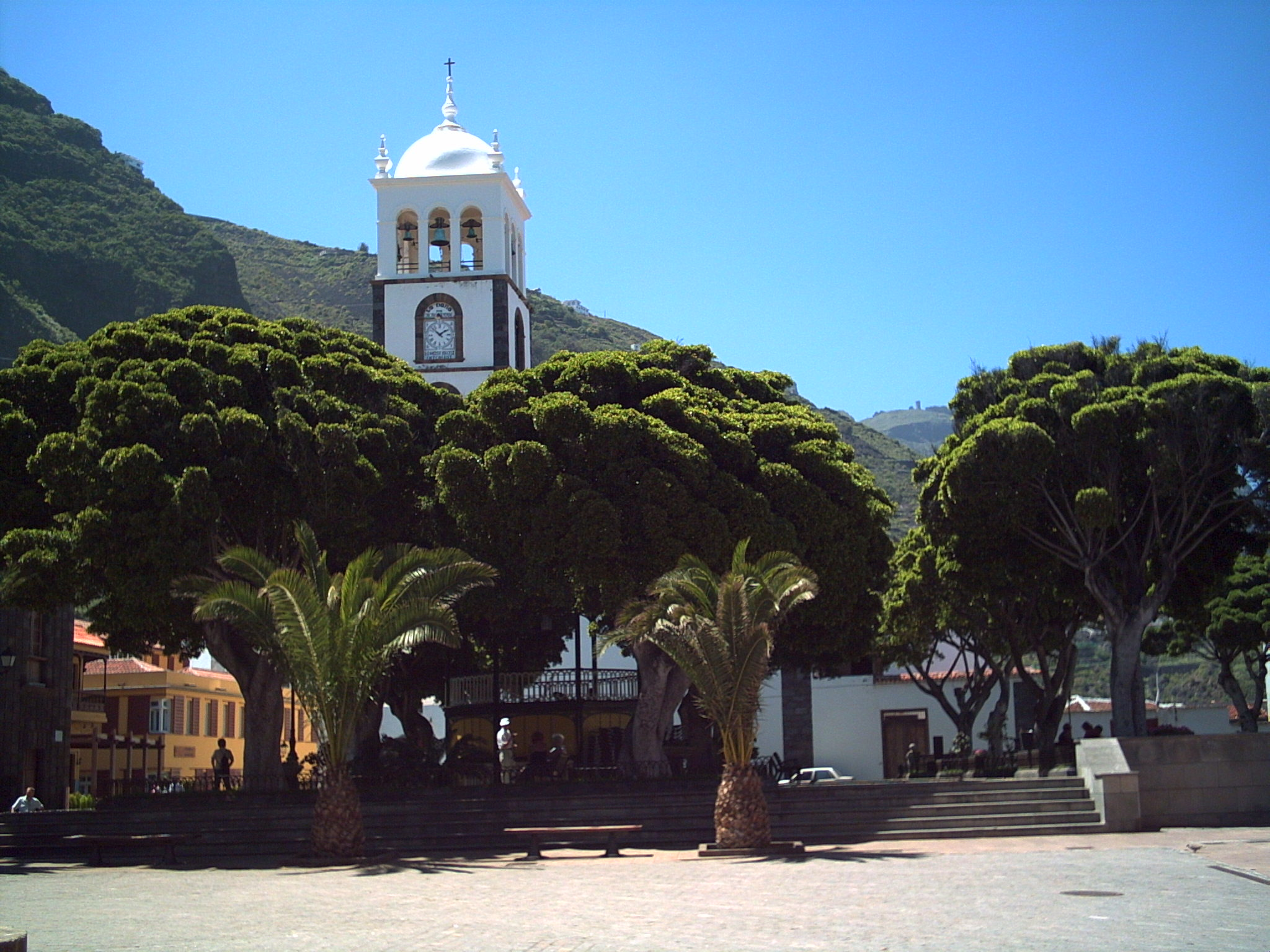
view

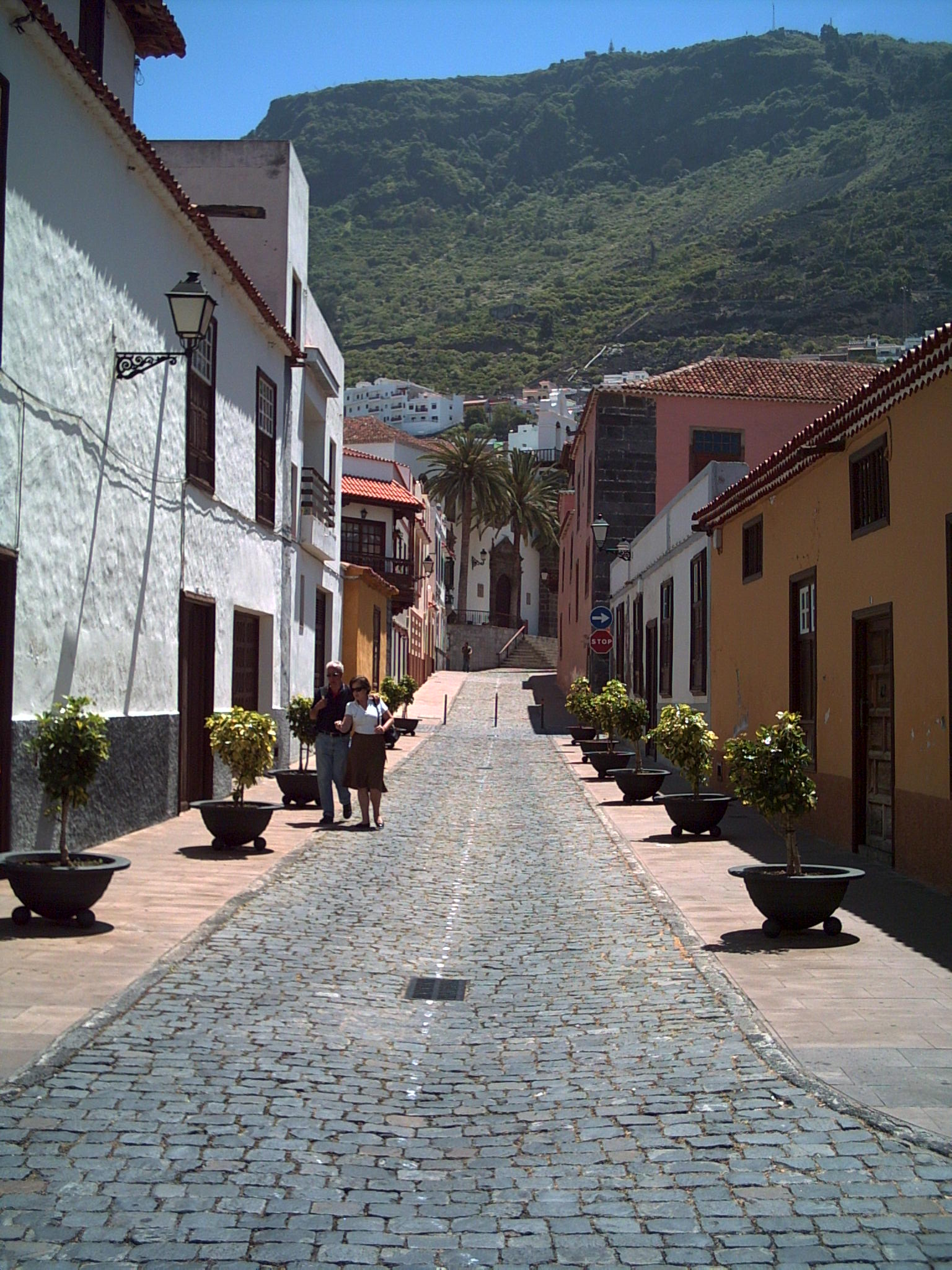
street

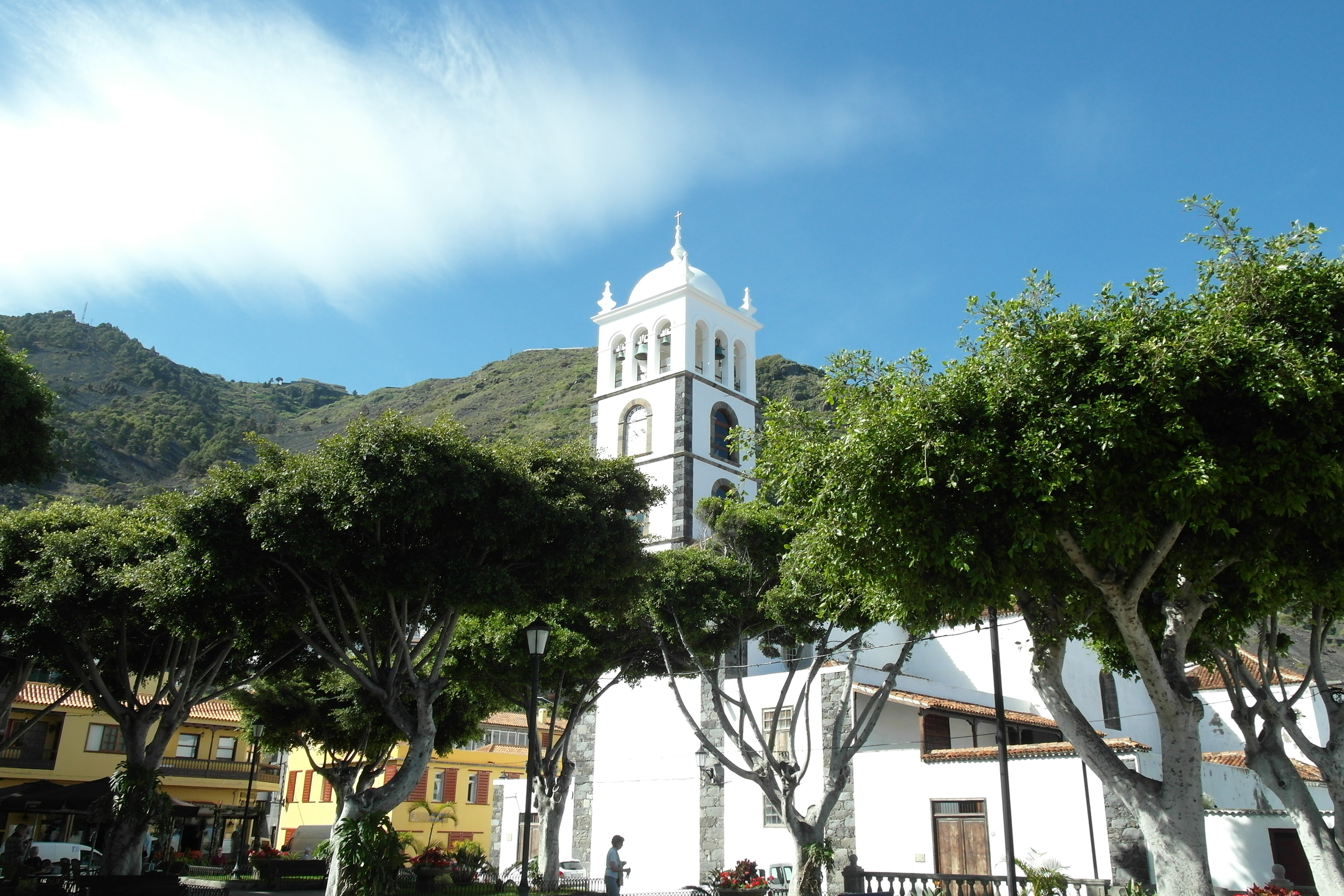
Church of Santa Ana

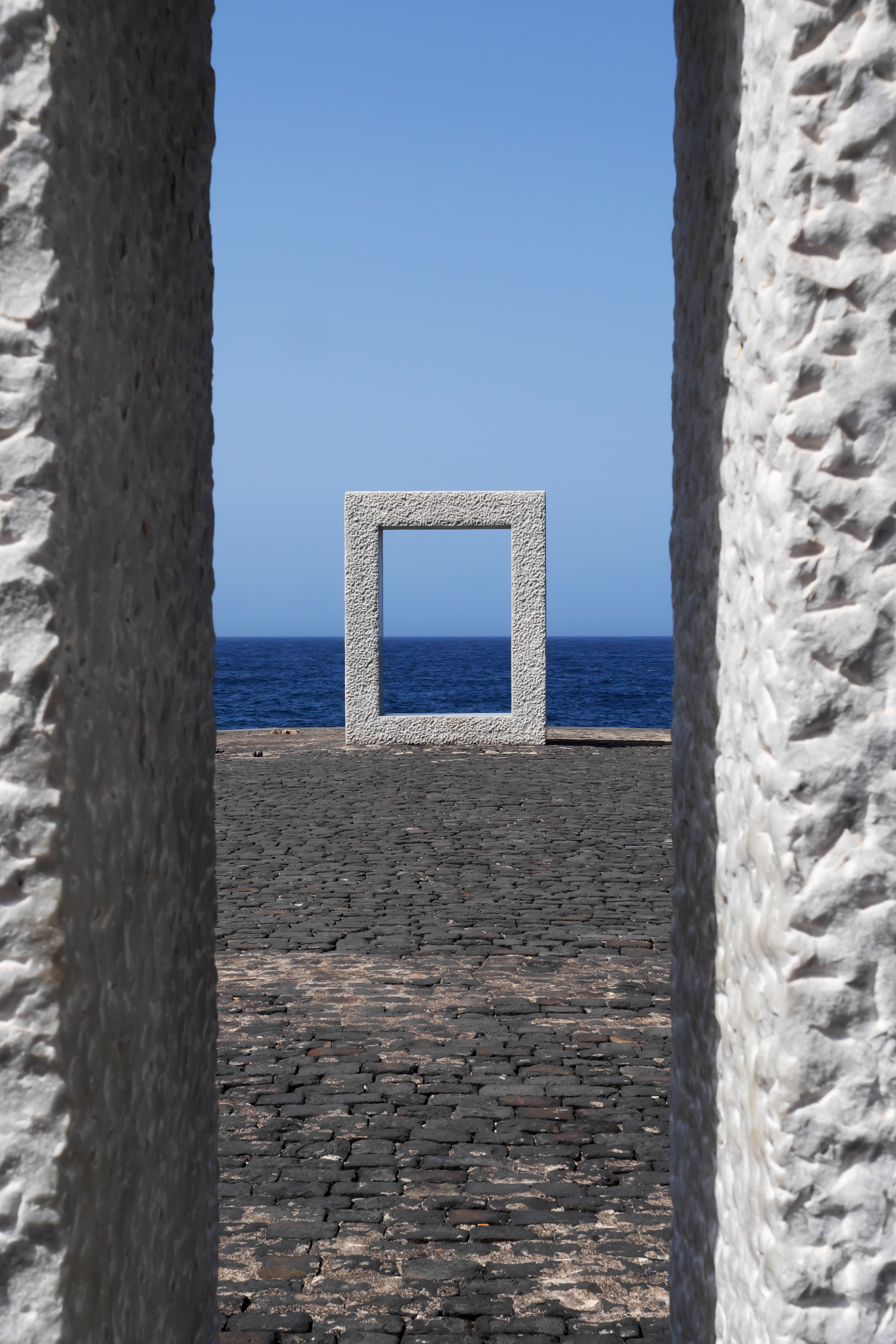
Art installation

== See also ==
- Roque de Garachico
- Eruption of Trevejo (1706)
- Port of Garachico
- Church of Santa Ana (Garachico)
