= Las Manchas =

Las Manchas may refer to the following places in the Canary Islands of Spain:

- Las Manchas, La Palma, a locality on island of La Palma
- Las Manchas, Tenerife, a district of Santiago del Teide on island of Tenerife
