= Canary hotspot =

Volcanically active region off the coast of Africa

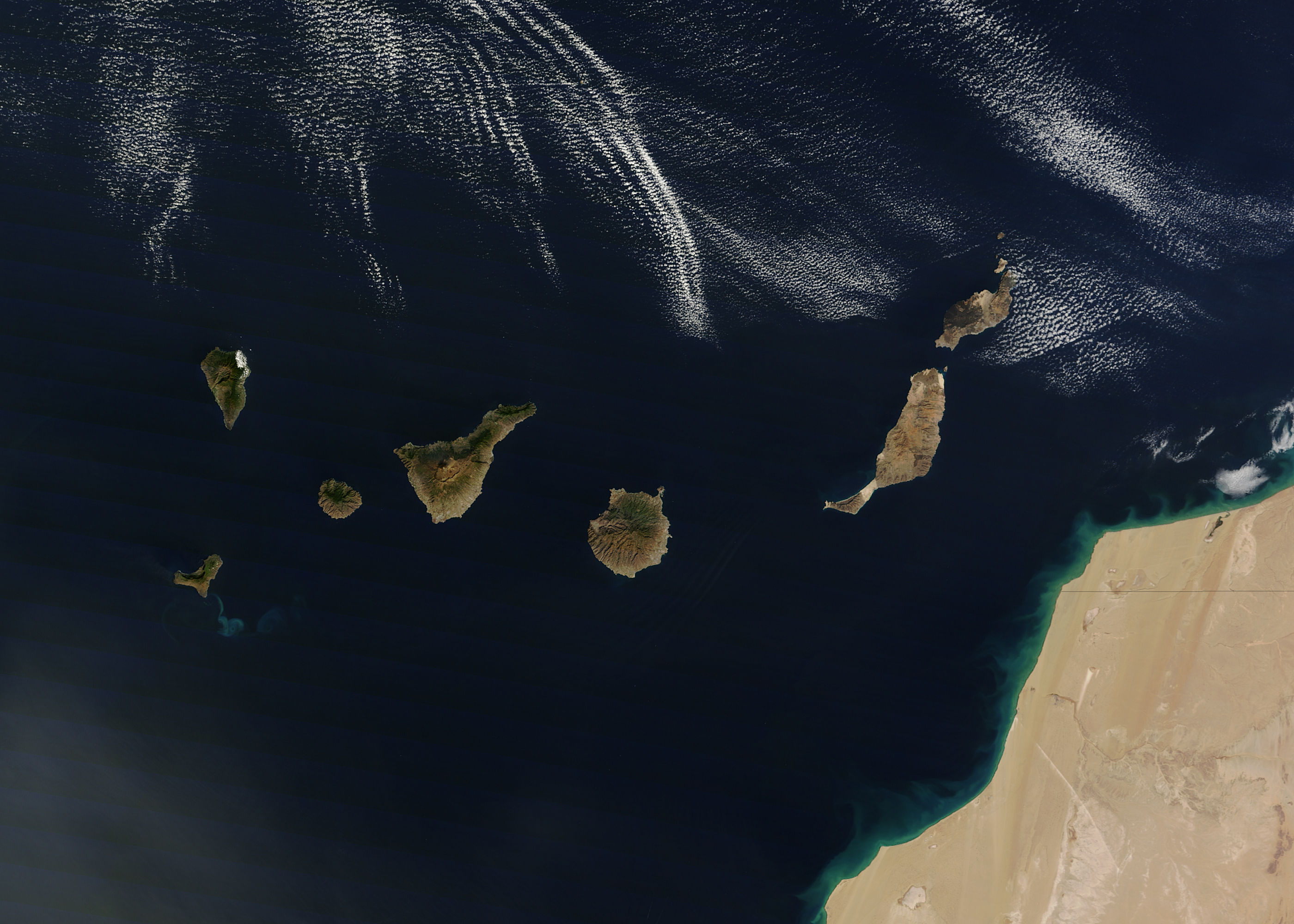
A satellite image of the Canary Islands

The Canary hotspot, also called the Canarian hotspot, is a hotspot and volcanically active region centred on the Canary Islands located off the north-western coast of Africa. Hypotheses for this volcanic activity include a deep mantle plume beginning about 70 million years ago. The underwater El Hierro and subaerial Cumbre Vieja eruptions remain the most recent Canarian eruptions.

== Formation ==
The deep mantle plume hypothesis on Canary hotspot formation proposes how the current-day Canary islands rested above a province of tholeiitic magma during the Triassic Period. The province, known as the Central Atlantic Magmatic Province (CAMP), became active and extended over 10 million km^{2}, developing into what scientists call today the Mid-Atlantic Ridge. The archipelago formed about 60 million years ago from a magma source. The African Plate then shifted the plate the archipelago rests on over a stationary mantle plume. However, this hypothesis has been scrutinized for periods of up to several million years of a lack of volcanic activity between islands.

== Recent activity ==
=== El Hierro eruption ===
From July to September 2011, the Canarian island of El Hierro experienced thousands of small tremors, believed to be the result of magma movements beneath the island. This resulted in fears of an imminent volcanic eruption, which began October 10, 2011, approximately 1 km south of the island in a fissure on the ocean floor. Eruptions continued until March 2012.

=== Cumbre Vieja eruption ===
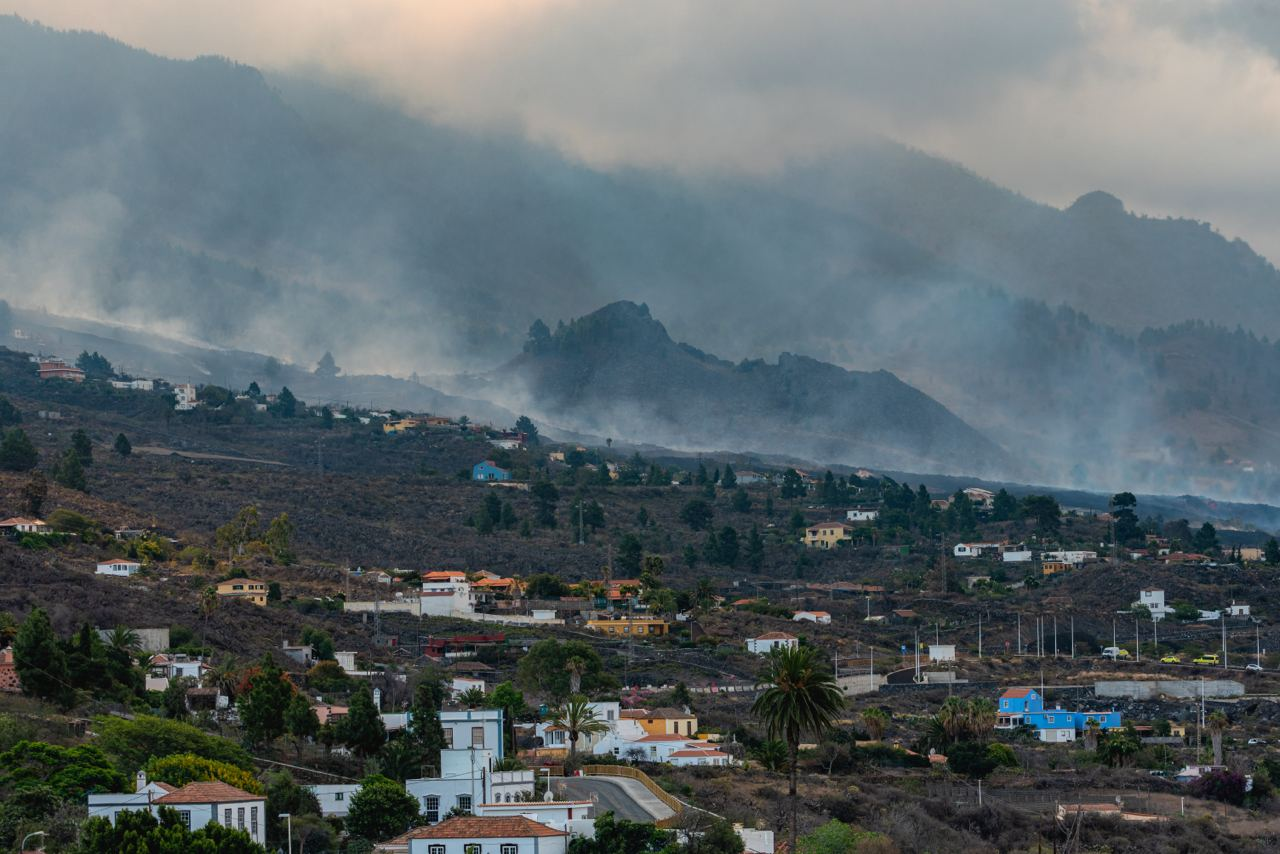
Buildings near the Cumbre Vieja eruption

Prior to the Cumbre Vieja eruption on the island of La Palma on September 20, 2021, over 25,000 earthquakes were recorded starting on September 10. Since the 1971 Teneguía eruption, the volcano has remained very active, as since October 2017 until the 2021 eruption alone, nine earthquake swarms occurred. As a result of the Cumbre Vieja eruption, over 5,000 of the island's inhabitants had to evacuate, significantly decreasing casualties. Still, more than 1300 homes and 1500 utility buildings were damaged and continuous magma flow stalled repair efforts for weeks.

== See also ==
- Geology of the Canary Islands
