= Cumbre Vieja =

Volcano in La Palma, Spain

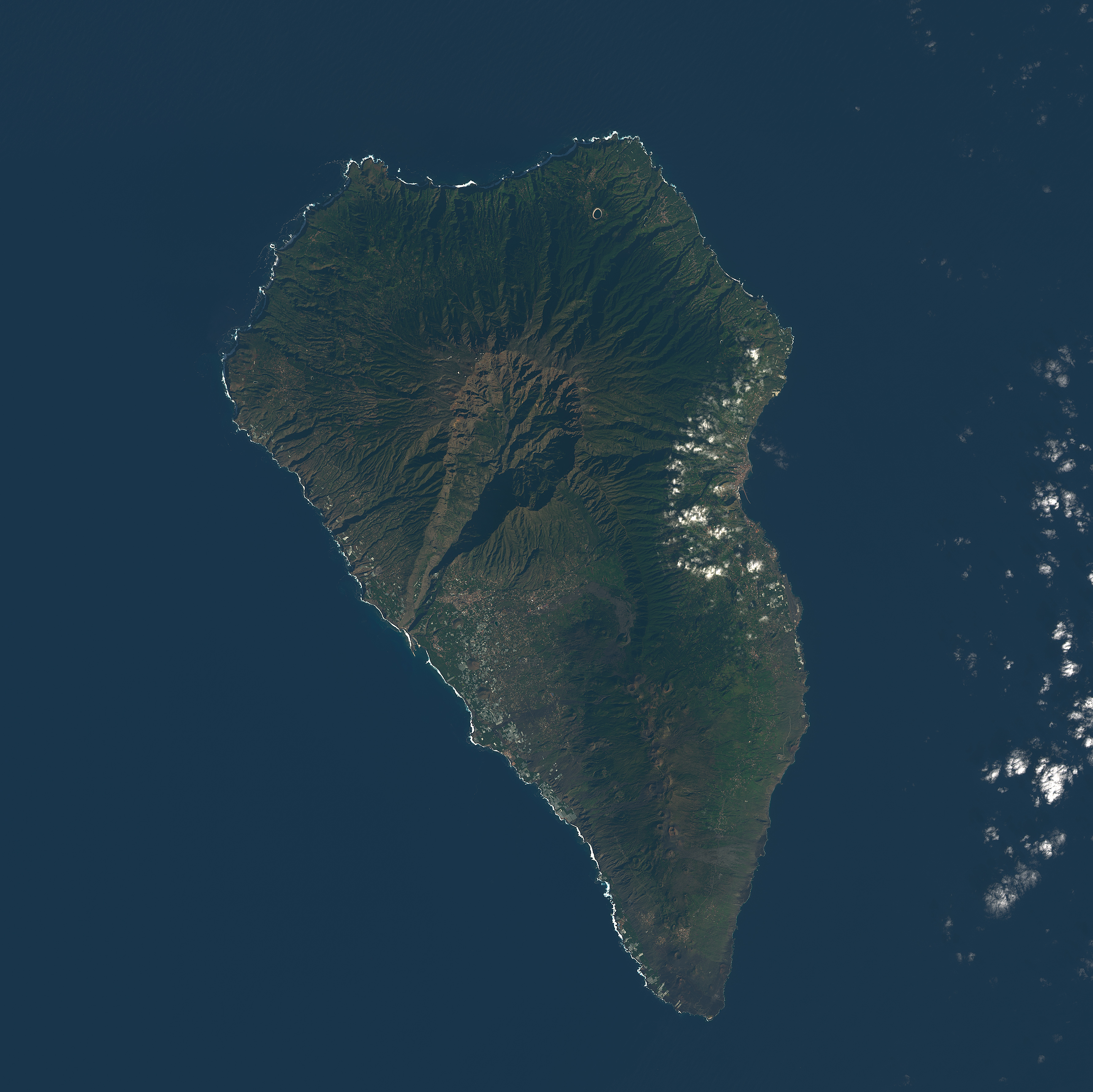
- Satellite photo of La Palma island in 2016, with Cumbre Vieja on the southern part of the island (picture is oriented with north at the top)

Highest point
- Elevation: 1,949 m (6,394 ft)
- Coordinates: 28°34′N 17°50′W

Geography
- Location: La Palma, Canary Islands, Spain

Geology
- Mountain type: Stratovolcano
- Last eruption: 2021

The Cumbre Vieja (Spanish pronunciation: [ˈkumbɾe ˈβjexa]; meaning "Old Summit") is an active volcanic ridge on the island of La Palma in the Canary Islands, Spain. The spine of Cumbre Vieja trends in an approximate north–south direction, comprising the southern half of La Palma, with both summit ridge and flanks pockmarked by dozens of craters and cones. The latest eruption began on 19 September 2021 in a forested area of Las Manchas locality known as Cabeza de Vaca. Voluminous lava flows quickly reached populated areas downslope, fanning out across settlements and banana plantations, destroying thousands of buildings and ultimately pouring over steep cliffs into the ocean to enlarge the island at several locations. The volcano went quiet on 13 December 2021, and on 25 December 2021, the local government declared the eruption to be over.

Cumbre Vieja erupted twice in the 20th century, in 1949 (Volcán San Juan) and in 1971 (Volcán Teneguía).

== Volcanic history ==
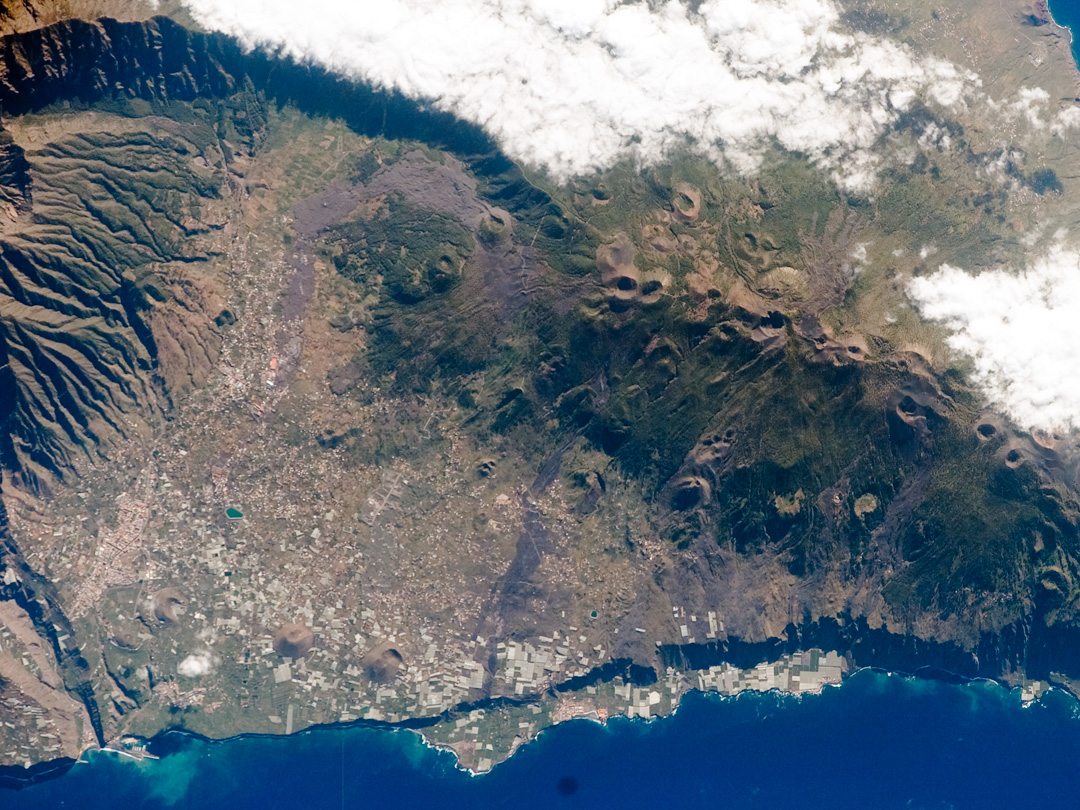
International Space Station image of Cumbre Vieja (right) and its volcanic cones (in 2008)

La Palma is a volcanic ocean island located on the African Plate and is currently—along with Tenerife—one of the most volcanically active of the Canary Islands. Since about 125,000 years ago (~125 ka), all subaerial eruptions on La Palma have been associated with the Cumbre Vieja, with eruptions ranging over the whole 25-kilometre-long ridge. Submarine surveys show that the Cumbre Vieja continues south of Punta de Fuencaliente (the "Point of the Hot Source"), but no volcanic activity connected with the submarine extension has yet been observed. Historical eruptions on the Cumbre Vieja occurred in 1470, 1585, 1646, 1677, 1712, 1949, 1971, and 2021.

Detailed geological mapping shows that the distribution and orientation of vents and feeder dykes within the volcano have shifted from a triple rift system (typical of most volcanic ocean islands) to a single north–south rift. It is hypothesised that this structural reorganisation is in response to evolving stress patterns associated with the development of a possible detachment fault under the volcano's west flank. Siebert (1984) showed that such failures are due to the intrusion of parallel and sub-parallel dykes into a rift. This causes the flanks to become over-steep and this inevitably causes the structure of the volcano to become unstable to the point that catastrophic failure may occur. There is no evidence beyond its surface expression that the 1949 section of the rift extends in a north–south direction, nor that there is a developing detachment plane. Research is ongoing.

=== 1949 eruption ===
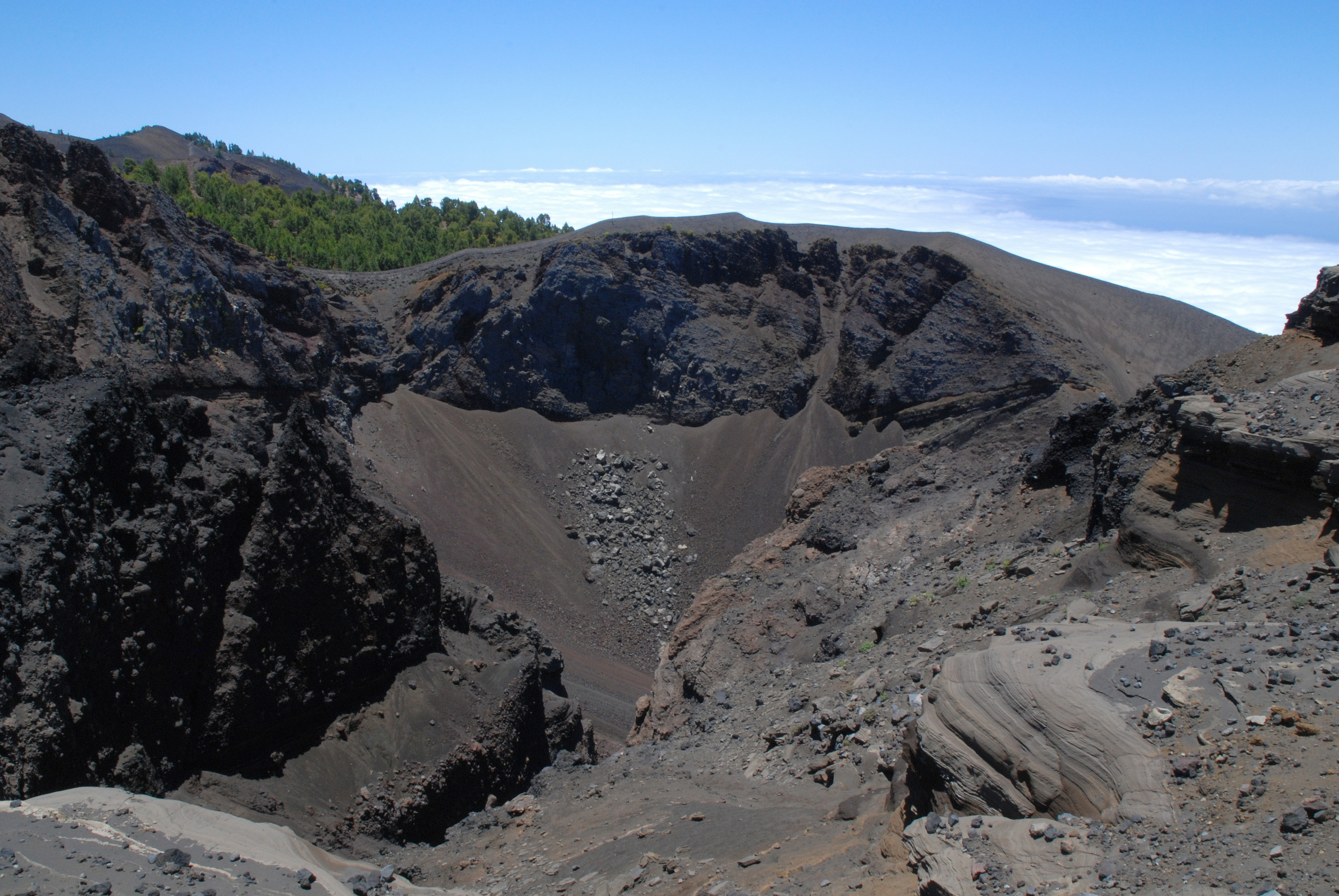
Crater del Hoyo Negro, 2008

The only contemporaneous account of the eruption was published in 1950 by one of the scientists—Juan Bonelli-Rubio who witnessed the eruption first hand and recorded details of the various phenomena that occurred during the eruption. All other published accounts are based upon Bonelli-Rubio's observations. The next report regarding the eruption was a joint publication by Ortiz and Bonelli-Rubio published in 1951. This drew heavily on Bonelli-Rubio's observations and also analysis of various phenomena associated with the eruption. Both accounts are published in Spanish.

The eruption started on 24 June 1949, the feast day of St John, which is why in Spanish texts the eruption is referred to as la erupción del Nambroque o San Juan, which in English is "The Eruption of the Nambroque or St John's volcano". During the 1949 eruption, eruptive activity was located at three vents—Duraznero, Llano del Banco, and Hoyo Negro—mild strombolian activity occurred at the Duraznero vent. Lava was erupted from the Llano del Banco vents, whilst only mild phreatomagmatic emissions occurred at the Hoyo Negro vent. Then on 30 July—the last day of eruptive activity, lava was erupted at the Duraznero fissure and vent. During the eruption on 1 and 2 July, two strong earthquakes with an estimated intensity of VIII on the Modified Mercalli Scale also occurred, the epicentre was calculated to be near Jedey. Following the earthquakes a fracture was noted and it had a length of approximately one and half kilometres. It was traceable to the Hoyo Negro and Duraznero vents, making a total length of about two and half kilometres or about 1/10 of the exposed length of the Cumbre Vieja, and parts of the western half of the Cumbre Vieja ridge had apparently moved about 1 metre sideways and 2 metres downwards towards the Atlantic Ocean. It was only in the vicinity of the Duraznero and Hoyo Negro vents that the vertical displacement attained about 4 metres. As of 2009, the fracture is still visible and still has the same dimensions recorded in 1949.

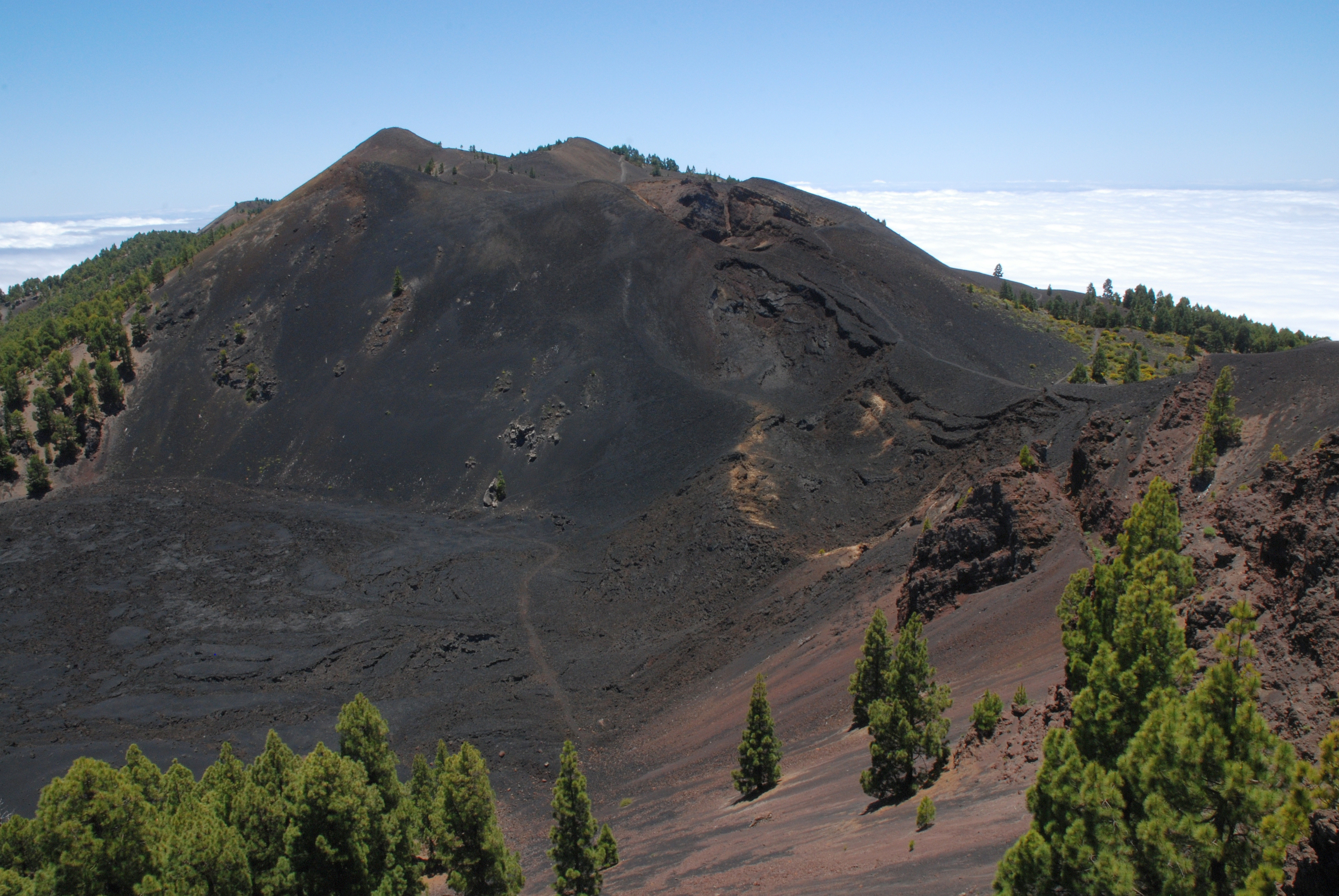
The lava lake La Malforada with Montaña del Fraile, in the background Vulcano Deseada, 2008

The timeline for the eruption, according to Bonelli-Rubio, is as follows: The first reported seismic activity was noted on the southern rim of the Caldera de Taburiente on 23 July 1936 at about 23:30 (11.30 pm) local time, with further activity noted over the next two days. During the following years periodic seismic activity occurred, but due to the absence of monitoring equipment, the only reports are those recorded in the media. Then at about 09:00 (local time) on 24 June 1949, the Duraznero vent opened with mildly explosive activity, venting of gases, and rocks; with eruptive activity continuing in this manner until 6 July. During this phase a strong earthquake occurred on 1 July and again on 2 July with an estimated intensity of VIII on the Modified Mercalli Scale. Visits to the summit region revealed a crack about 1.5 km (~1 mile) long which extended in a northerly direction from the Hoyo Negro ("Black Hole") and about 1 km (~0.5-mile) south to the Duraznero vent making a total length of about 2.5 km (~1.6-mile), (this crack is the subject of research and heated debate as to whether it indicates initial failure of the western flank—or not). Later analysis placed the epicentre north of the township of Jedey. Eruptive activity at the Duraznero vent ceased on 6 July with only degassing continuing. No eruptive activity occurred on 7 July. On 8 July eruptive activity commenced at the Llano del Banco vents—about 4 km (~2.8miles) north of the Duraznero vent, as lava was erupted and flowed down the western flank. The vents opened progressively up the barranco (ravine), forming a series of en echelon (diagonally side by side), vents. On 10 July the westward flow of lava from the Llano del Banco vents reached the coast at Puerto de Naos and entered the Atlantic Ocean, forming a lava delta, the velocity is estimated at ~14 metres (approximately 46 feet) per sec. On 12 July mildly explosive activity commenced at the Hoyo Negro (Black Hole) with emissions of rocks, fumes and some phreatomagmatic activity indicating that the eruption had encountered ground waters. Activity at the Hoyo Negro ceased on 22 July, but continued at the Llano del Banco vents until 26 July. Only residual fumarolic activity and thermal emissions then occurred until 30 July when the Duraznero vent and fissure re-activated. Lava then flowed from the Duraznero vent and fissure, filling the adjacent crater of El Fraile and created a lava lake. This subsequently overflowed and the lava flowed down the eastern flank towards the ocean. It finally stopped about 30m (about 100 feet) from the ocean. Also later, on 30 July all eruptive activity ceased and only residual fumarolic activity continued until 4 August; thereafter there was only thermal emissions. It is estimated that approximately 60 million cubic metres of lava was erupted during the eruption.

==== Volcanic explosivity index ====
The eruption style ranged from effusive—mildly explosive at the Duraznero and Llano del Banco vents—to mildly explosive at the Hoyo Negro vent and was strombolian in style. It is classed as having a volcanic explosivity index (VEI) of 2.

==== Earthquakes ====
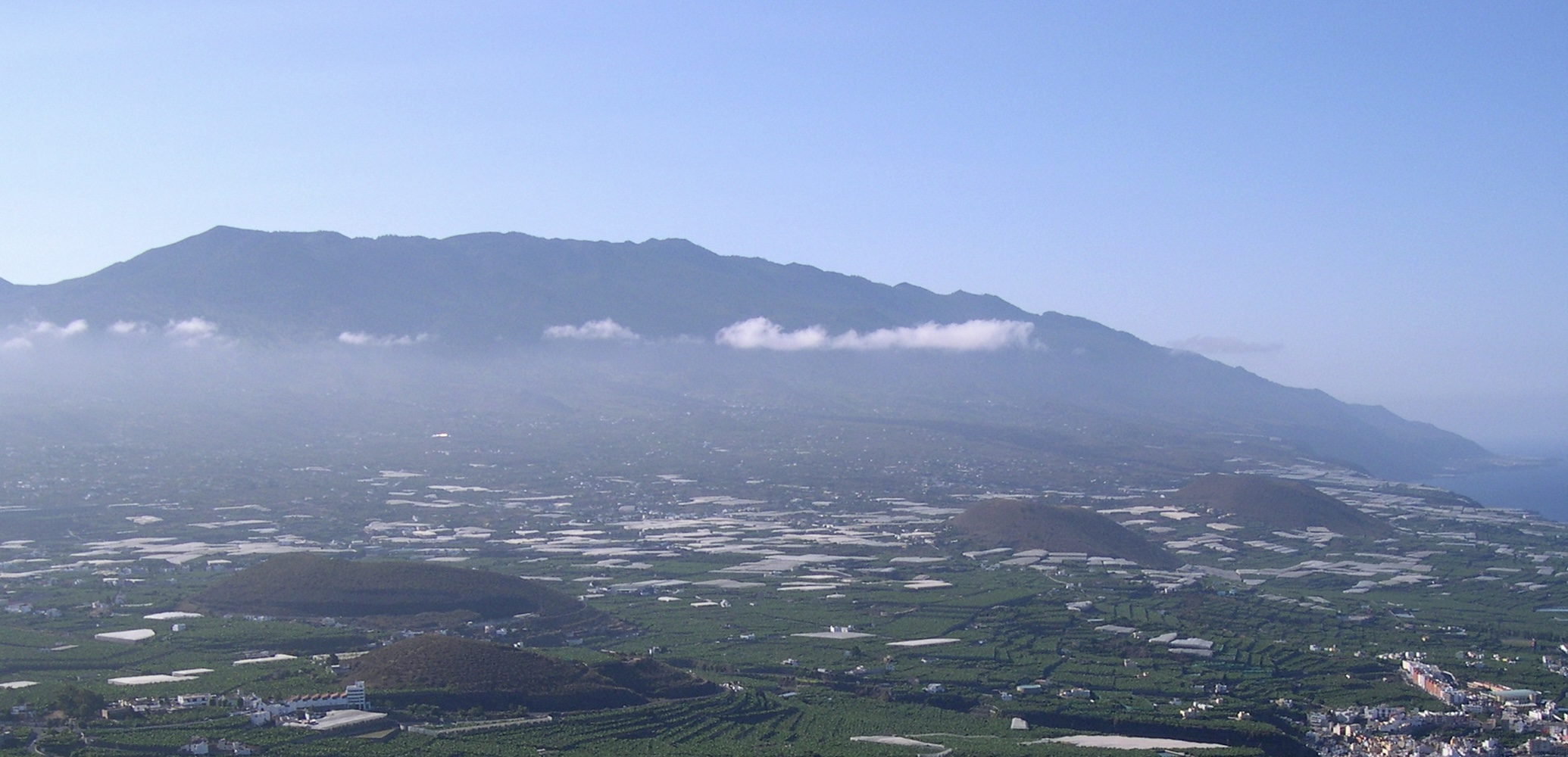
Cumbre Vieja, in 2004, viewed from the north-west

The process creating the earthquakes of 1 and 2 July is considered to have been driven by the pressure caused by the rising magma super-heating water trapped within the edifice of the volcano. It is unlikely that the trapped waters could vapourise due to being under considerable pressure. What is postulated is that the waters were heated to a point where they could not absorb further thermal energy in the available space. Continuing heating required the water to expand further and the only way it could do so was to move the flank of the volcano. This caused the two earthquakes that were reported as occurring during the eruption along with the development of the crack.

That the water entrapped within the edifice did not vapourise is shown by the absence of phreatomagmatic explosions except the mildly explosive eruptive activity that occurred at the Hoyo Negro vent from 12 to 22 July: steam escaping explosively from the ground is often a precursor of volcanic activity. Further evidence that vapourisation did not occur is that when Rubio Bonelli visited the rift the following day, the newly opened fissure "... Was not issuing fumes, vapour, steam, ashes, lava or other materials ..." In fact at no time during or after was steam or phreatomagmatic activity reported. This reinforces the claim that the waters trapped within the edifice never vapourised, which they would do if the pressure had fallen sufficiently to allow the super-heated water to flash into steam. Only at the Hoyo Negro did any phreatomagmatic activity occur. Unlike the northern sector of the island, the Cumbre Vieja is "dry". Unlike the northern sector there are no water galleries, and it is therefore unlikely that the earthquake was caused—as claimed by Day et al.; by water becoming superheated by rising magma. Research is continuing.

Due to the lack of seismic monitoring equipment on the island, any claims about seismic activity are based upon personal observation and may not be reliable.

=== 1971 eruption ===
The 1971 eruption occurred at the southern end of the Cumbre Vieja at the Teneguía vent. The eruption was mainly strombolian in style. Lava was erupted. Seismic activity did occur before and during the 1971 eruption but was not on the scale associated with the 1949 eruption. Residual thermal emissions continue.

=== 2021 eruption ===
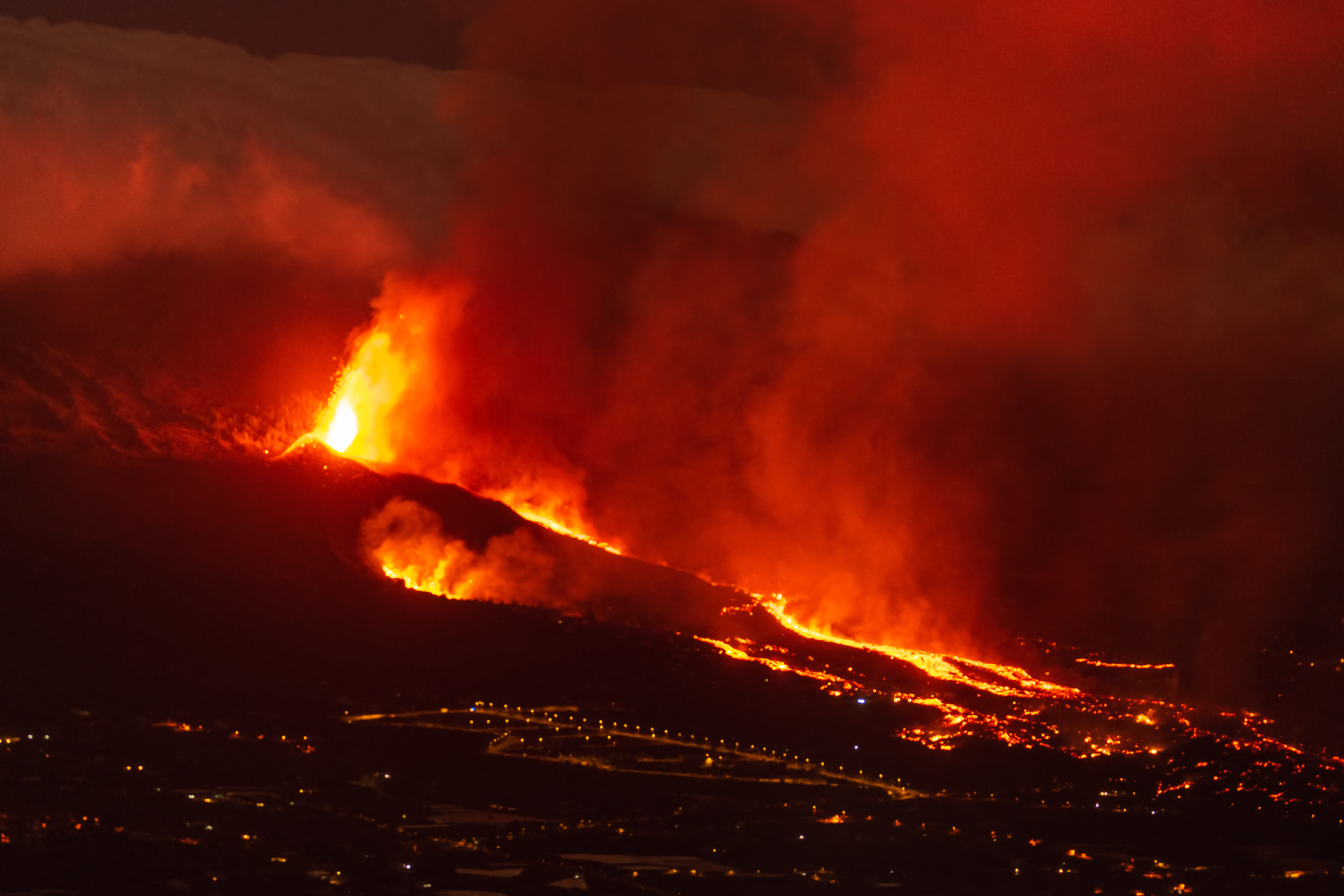
The eruption seen at night on 20 September 2021

An earthquake swarm started under Cumbre Vieja on 11 September 2021. It slowly migrated to the surface, with earthquakes up to around 5 on the Richter scale, and over 25,000 recorded in the space of 10 days. On 19 September at 15:15 local time (14:15 UTC), the volcano started erupting, in Cabeza de Vaca in the Montaña Rajada mountains, in the Las Manchas section of El Paso municipality, A yellow warning was issued, covering 35,000 people in the municipalities of Los Llanos de Aridane, Fuencaliente, El Paso and Villa de Mazo, later raising to its highest level—red—due to the eruption. A total of around 7,000 people were evacuated from the area. The eruption stopped on 13 December 2021, and was declared to be over on 25 December 2021.

The role of Special Commissioner for the Reconstruction of the island of La Palma was created in 2022 to coordinate and promote the actions adopted by the General State Administration to repair the damage caused by volcanic eruptions and for the reconstruction of the island of La Palma. It has the rank of Under Secretary. Hector Izquierdo Triana, born in La Palma and secretary of state for finance at that time, was appointed to this responsibility.

== Potential megatsunami ==
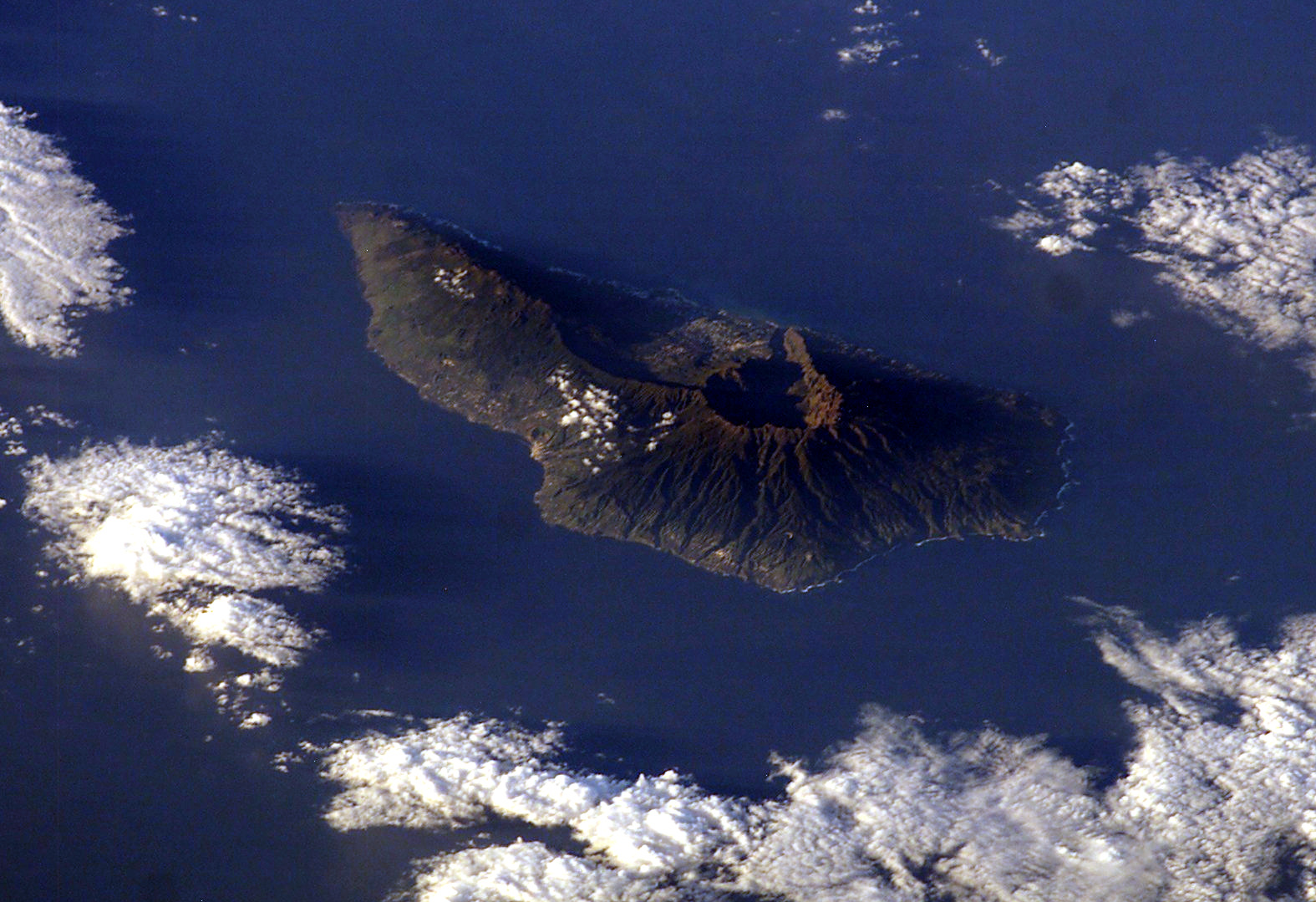
Satellite photo of La Palma (north is in the lower right). The crater in the centre is the Caldera de Taburiente. The Cumbre Vieja is the ridge to the south (upper left) of the caldera and between them is the Cumbre Nueva.

Day et al. (1999) indicated that the Cumbre Vieja may be in the initial stages of failure. The authors of the paper also said that the geological development of La Palma had undergone changes due to the southerly migration of the hotspot and the collapse of the earlier volcanoes. Subsequent to this, a triple-arm rift system had evolved with the eventual closing down of volcanic activity associated with two of the arms—the north-west and north-east rifts. The reasons can only be hypothesised. This caused the southern arm—the Cumbre Vieja—to be the sole location of volcanic activity. As a result, they postulated that the western flank may be in the initial stages of failure.

In October 2000, the British Broadcasting Corporation (BBC) transmitted a Horizon programme called "Mega-tsunami: Wave of Destruction", which suggested that a future failure of the western flank of Cumbre Vieja could cause a megatsunami.

On 18 April 2013, the BBC transmitted a follow-up programme entitled Could we survive a Mega-Tsunami? The programme was presented in a "breaking news" reporting style. It painted a scenario in which the western flank of the Cumbre Vieja had collapsed and the initial wave had an amplitude of about 1,000 metres. The programme used computer generated graphics to present a story line that is based on a hypothesis. The programme interviewed several scientific personnel to give credence to the story. One scientist claimed, "This is a true story—only it hasn't happened yet!"

Day et al. (1999), Ward and Day (2001) and Ward and Day (2005) hypothesize that, during an eruption at some future date, the western half of the Cumbre Vieja—approximately 500 km^{3} (5 × 10^{11} m^{3}) with an estimated mass of 1.5 trillion metric tons—will catastrophically fail in a massive gravitational landslide and enter the Atlantic Ocean, generating a so-called mega-tsunami. The debris will continue to travel along the ocean floor as a debris flow. Computer modelling indicates that the resulting initial wave may attain a local amplitude (height) in excess of 600 metres (2,000 ft) and an initial peak-to-peak height that approximates to 2 kilometres (1 mi), and travel at about 720 kilometres per hour (450 mph) (approximately the speed of a jet aircraft), inundating the African coast in about one hour, the southern coastlines of the British Isles in about 3.5 hours, and the eastern seaboard of North America in about six hours, by which time the initial wave will have subsided into a succession of smaller ones each about 30 metres (100 ft) to 60 metres (200 ft) high. These may surge to several hundred metres in height and be several kilometres apart while retaining their original speed. The models of Day et al.; (1999), Ward and Day (2001), suggest that the event could inundate up to 25 kilometres (16 mi) inland. If the model is correct, then this scale of inundation would greatly damage or destroy cities along the entire North American eastern seaboard, including Boston, New York City, Miami and many other cities near the Atlantic coast.

There is controversy about the threat presented by the Cumbre Vieja. Current indications are that recent landslides may have been gradual and therefore may not generate tsunamis unless they increase in magnitude. Studies of possible local 'mega-tsunamis' in the Hawaiian Islands draw distinctions between the tsunami wave periods caused by landslides and subduction-zone earthquakes, arguing that a similar collapse in Hawaii would not endanger Asian or North American coastlines.

Sonar surveys around many volcanic ocean islands including the Canary Islands, Hawaii, Réunion etc., have mapped debris flows on the sea floor. Many of these debris flows, about 100 kilometres (62 mi) long and up to 2 kilometres (1.24 mi) thick, contain mega-blocks mixed up with finer detritus. The debris flows are now considered to be a normal process where a volcano sheds some proportion of excess material and thereby makes itself more stable. It is also known to occur on all volcanoes based on the land, in or under the sea.

Moore (1964) was the first geologist to interpret such features depicted on a United States Navy bathymetric chart. The chart showed two features that seem to originate from the Hawaiian islands of Oahu and Molokai.

Moss et al. (1999) reported that the western flank of La Palma is static and there is no indication that it has moved since 1949, confirming the dimensions provided by Bonelli-Rubio (1950).

Carracedo et al. (2001) state that they consider the crack to be a surface expression which is of a shallow and inactive nature. They also indicate that it should be monitored, but consider the possibility that the edifice is unstable as being almost non-existent.

The Tsunami Society (2002) claim that the model used by Day et al. (1999), Ward and Day (2001), and Ward and Day (2005) is wrong. They caution about the claims made by Day et al. and Ward and Day, stating that there is no evidence of a mega-tsunami having been generated by volcanic edifice failure.

Ward and Day (2003) reported on the only documented flank collapse of a volcanic island at that time—Ritter Island, that occurred on 13 March 1888 (a tsunami from a volcanic collapse happened subsequently to this paper in 2018 at Anak Krakatoa). Approximately 5 × 10^{9} m^{3} (6.5 × 10^{9} yd^{3}) of material—about two orders of magnitude less than the claimed mass of the Cumbre Vieja—generated a landslide which entered the ocean and generated a westerly-directed tsunami. The tsunami inundated adjoining islands and may have killed several hundred people. According to Cooke, damage was inflicted on islands several hundreds of kilometres from Ritter Island. There is no record of inundation occurring at trans-oceanic distances. The tsunami was witnessed by several Europeans living on many of the islands.

Murty et al. (2005) claim that it is almost impossible for a trans-oceanic tsunami to be generated in the basin of the Atlantic Ocean, which—if correct—supports the work by many other researchers that the failure of the western flank of the Cumbre Vieja would be unlikely to generate a "mega-tsunami".

Pérez-Torrado et al. (2006) indicate that marine deposits located between 41 and 188 metres (135 and 617 ft) above sea level in the Agaete Valley of Gran Canaria resulted, when ~3 × 10^{10} m^{3} (3.9 × 10^{10} yd^{3})—one order of magnitude less than that of models of Day et al.; (1999), Ward and Day, (2001); and Ward and Day, (2005),—of volcanic material collapsed, forming the Güimar Valle on Tenerife ~830 ka and generating a tsunami. They indicate that this collapse is the only plausible source, and also report that there is no indication that the tsunami propagated beyond Gran Canaria. These deposits date from between 32,000 and 1,750,000 years ago.

Scientists at TU Delft in the Netherlands reported in 2006, that the section of the western flank of the Cumbre Vieja that was conjectured as potentially failing and falling into the Atlantic Ocean to create the hypothesised La Palma mega-tsunami was both too small in mass and volume, and far too stable to break away within the next 10,000 years.

A 2008 paper by Løvholt et al. looked into this very worst-case scenario, the most massive slide that could happen (though unlikely and probably impossible right now with the present day geology). They find wave heights in the range 10 to 188 metres (33 to 617 ft) in the Canary Isles themselves. But the waves interfere and dissipate as they head out into the Atlantic. They predict a height of 40 metres (131 ft) for some nearby island systems. For continents, the worst effects are in northern Brazil (13.6 metres (45 ft)), French Guiana (12.7 metres (42 ft)), Mid-Atlantic United States (9.6 metres (31 ft)), Western Sahara (largest prediction at 37 metres (121 ft)), and Mauritania (9.7 metres (32 ft)). This is not large enough to count as a megatsunami, with the highest prediction for Western Sahara comparable to the Japanese tsunami, so it would only be a megatsunami locally in the mid-Atlantic Ocean.

== See also ==
- 2021 Cumbre Vieja volcanic eruption
- 2011–12 El Hierro eruption
- 1971 Teneguía eruption
