= El Paso, La Palma =

El Paso
- Municipality
- Flag Coat of arms

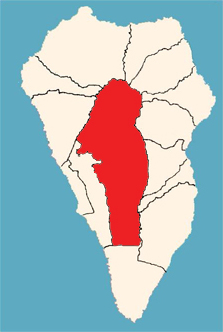

- Location in Canary Islands
- Coordinates: 28°39′N 17°53′W
- Country: Spain
- Autonomous community: Canary Islands
- Province: Santa Cruz de Tenerife
- Island: La Palma

Area
  - Total: 135.92 km^{2} (52.48 sq mi)

Population (2025-01-01)
  - Total: 8,290
  - Density: 61.0/km^{2} (158/sq mi)

El Paso, also known as Ciudad de El Paso, is a Spanish municipality located on the island of La Palma, province of Santa Cruz de Tenerife, Canary Islands.

Geographically it is located in the center of the island of La Palma, covering to the west with the Caldera de Taburiente, part of the Aridane Valley, the Cumbre Nueva and the Cumbre Vieja. It is on the surface the largest municipality of the island, being the only one of the 14 municipalities of La Palma that lacks coastal strip. In 2016 it had a population of 7457 inhabitants.

The nucleus of population had to have its origins in the pre-Hispanic stage of the island. Almost certainly, because of the engravings found in the area, it consisted of a first moment in a temporary settlement of Benahoarite shepherds. During the colonization and almost throughout the Modern Age the present territory of the municipality was administratively part of the Aridane Valley. In 1837, under the reign of Alfonso XII, the municipality obtained the title of City, segregating of the Los Llanos de Aridane.

At the summit of the municipality is the oldest canarian pine in the world, with an estimated age of more than 1000 years.

== History ==
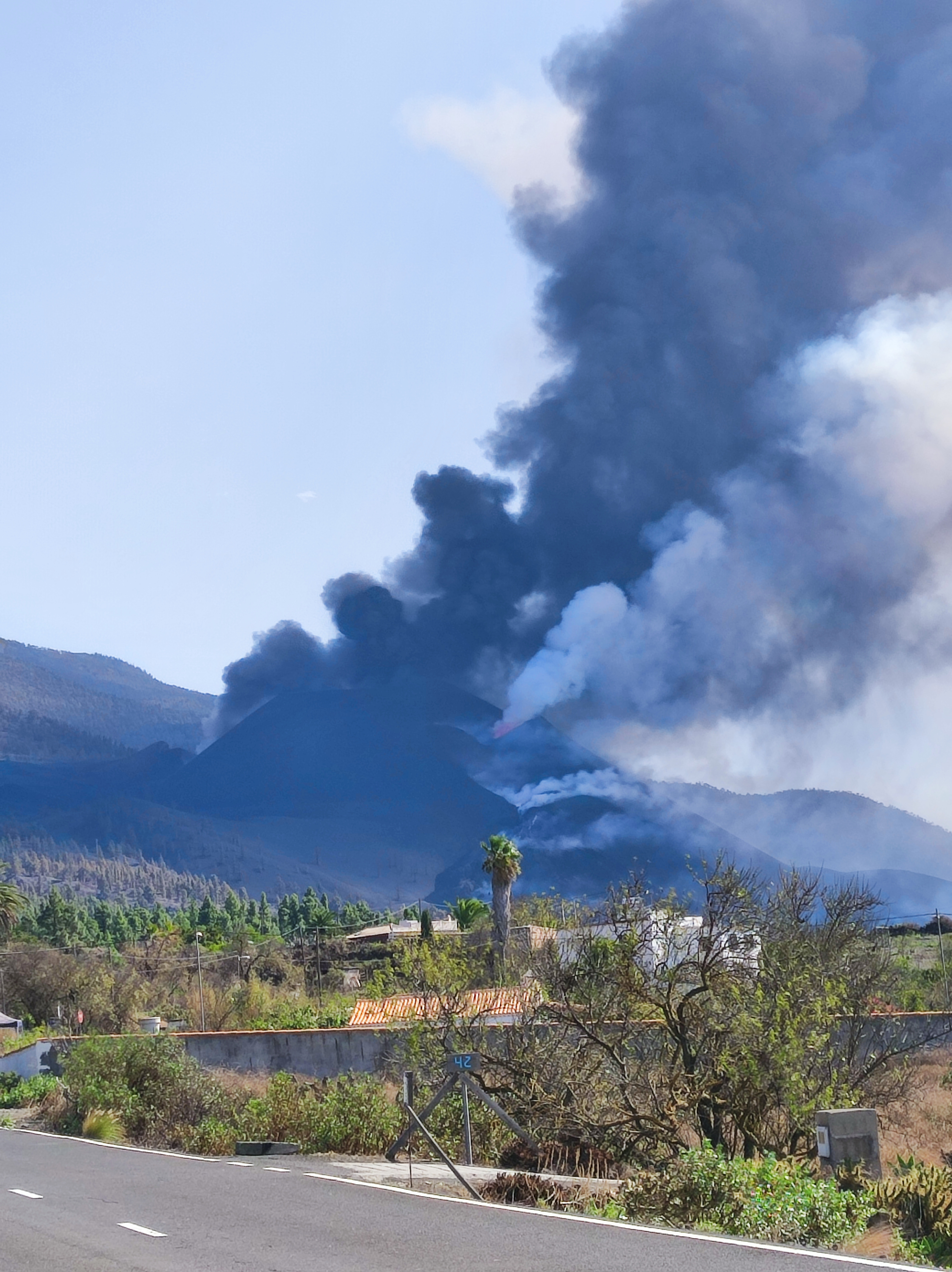
Volcano Cumbre Vieja on 21 October 2021

Many footpaths already crisscrossed La Palma before the Spanish conquest. A number of mountain passes east of present-day El Paso enabled cross-island communications. One of these was Ajerjo Pass by which the island's Spanish discoverer, Alonso Fernandez de Lugo, attempted to enter the Caldera de Taburiente, hence its local name the Captain's Pass (Paso del Capitán). The village of El Paso was named after this mountain pass by association.

On 3 May 1492 the mentioned Fernandez de Lugo finished the conquest of the island of La Palma by the Spanish when conquering the last remaining stronghold of the native Guanches, the kingdom of Aceró. To this goal, Fernandez deceitfully invited its king Tanausú to an interview, to have him imprisoned on appearance. The island was made directly subject to the Spanish Crown, a situation which would last until 1812. In this year the new Spanish Constitution paved the way for decentralisation of the Canary Islands and subdivision into municipalities.

At about 15:15 local time on Sunday 19 September 2021 the volcano above the town erupted following multiple tremors. It is situated in the Cumbre Vieja national park, despite having been quiet since 1971.

== Historical population ==
Historical population

| Year | Pop. | ±% |
|---|---|---|
| 2006 | 7,505 | — |
| 2007 | 7,514 | +0.1% |
| 2008 | 7,815 | +4.0% |
| 2009 | 7,815 | +0.0% |
| 2010 | 7,837 | +0.3% |
| 2011 | 7,947 | +1.4% |

| Year | Pop. | ±% |
|---|---|---|
| 2012 | 7,874 | −0.9% |
| 2013 | 7,928 | +0.7% |
| 2014 | 7,614 | −4.0% |
| 2015 | 7,563 | −0.7% |
| 2016 | 7,457 | −1.4% |

Source: INE-es

== Administration and policy ==
The local administration of the municipality is carried out through the City Council of El Paso, whose components are elected every four years by universal suffrage of all Spanish citizens and the European Union over 18 years of age who are registered in the municipality. According to the provisions of the General Electoral Regime Law, which establishes the number of eligible councilors depending on the population of the municipality, the Municipal Corporation of El Paso is formed by 13 councilors. The city council has mayor-president and twelve more councilors. In the elections of May 24, 2015 obtained a simple majority Canary Coalition, forming a coalition government with PSOE. The current government team is composed of the mayor-president, four mayors and three councilors.

List of mayors since the 1979 democratic elections:

| Mayor | Start | End | Political Party |
|---|---|---|---|
| Miguel Ángel Hernández Martín | 1979 | 1983 | Unión de Centro Democrático (UCD) |
| Miguel Ángel Hernández Martín | 1983 | 1983 | Grupo Electoral Libre de El Paso |
| Francisco Sánchez Pérez | 1983 | 1987 | Grupo Electoral Libre de El Paso |
| Francisco Sánchez Pérez | 1987 | 1991 | Agrupación Palmera de Independientes (API) |
| Francisco Sánchez Pérez | 1991 | 1995 | Agrupación Palmera de Independientes (API) |
| Ángel Raúl Rodríguez Pages | 1995 | 1999 | Partido Socialista Obrero Español (PSOE) |
| Francisco Sánchez Pérez | 1999 | 2000 | Coalición Canaria (CC) |
| Higinio Máximo Brito | 2000 | 2003 | Coalición Canaria (CC) |
| Jesús Manuel Rodríguez | 2003 | 2007 | Partido Popular (PP) |
| María Dolores Padilla Felipe | 2007 | 2009 | Partido Socialista Obrero Español (PSOE) |
| Higinio Máximo Brito | 2009 | 2011 | Coalición Canaria (CC) |
| María Dolores Padilla Felipe | 2011 | 2015 | Partido Socialista Obrero Español (PSOE) |
| Sergio Javier Rodríguez Fernández | 2015 | 2023 | Coalición Canaria (CC) |

== See also ==
- La Palma
- List of municipalities in Santa Cruz de Tenerife
