= Idafe Rock =

Natural stone pillar in La Palma

Coordinates: 28.7125°N 17.8758°W

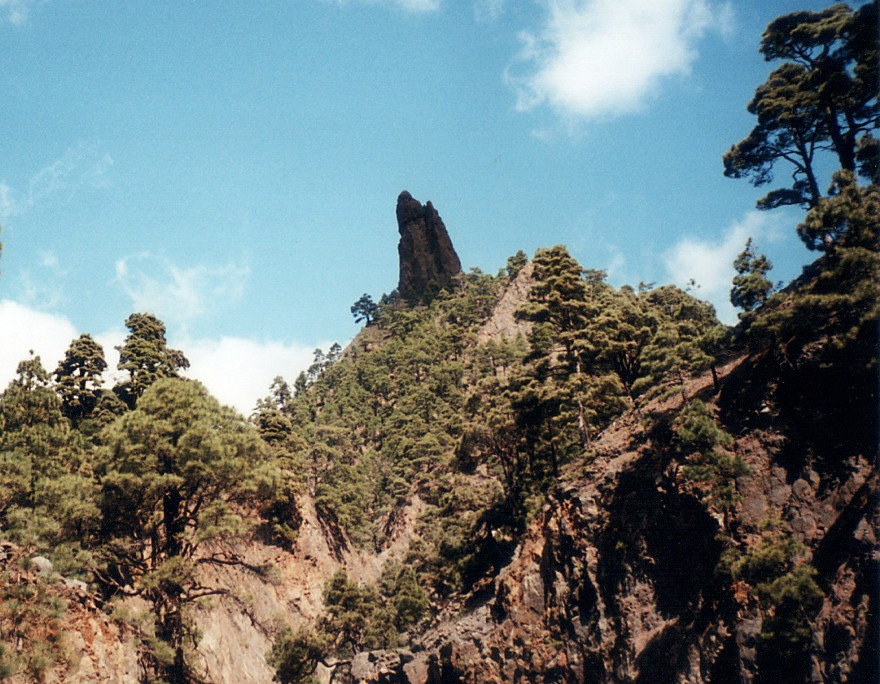
Idafe Rock

Idafe Rock is a natural stone pillar located in Caldera de Taburiente National Park on the island of La Palma in the Canary Islands.

The Guanches (indigenous Berbers of the Canaries), worshipped the Idafe Rock, identifying it as an Axis Mundi. Should it collapse, great catastrophes would befall the world. To prevent this, they made offerings of animal offal while chanting Iguida iguan Idafe? (Do they say that Idafe will fall?), followed by the response Que guerte iguan taro (Give it what you have brought and it will not fall!).

== See also ==
- Axis mundi
- Omphalos
