= Las Manchas, La Palma =

Las Manchas
- locality
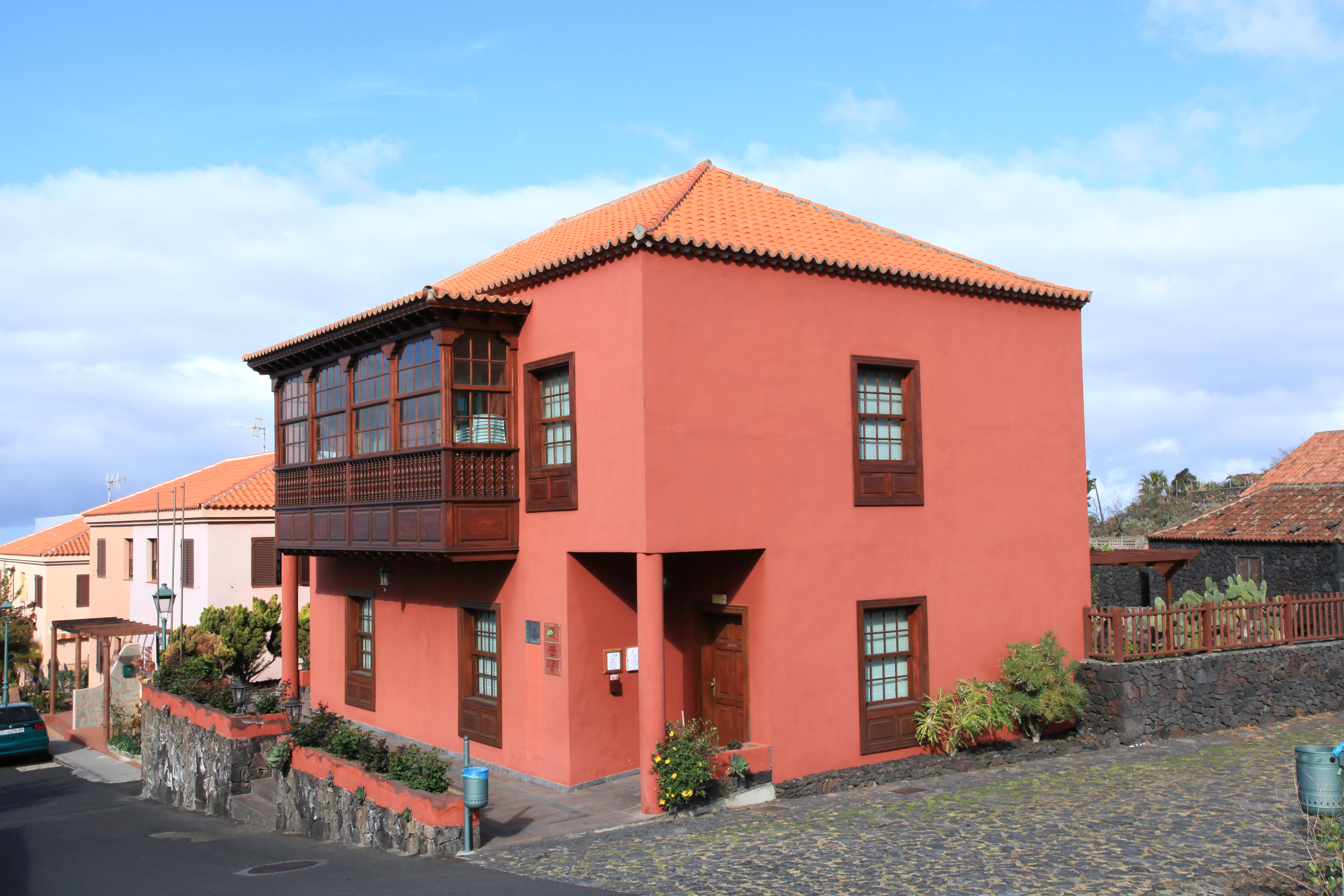

- Location in the Canary Islands
- Coordinates: 28°36′5″N 17°52′48″W
- Country: Spain
- Community: Canary Islands
- Province: Santa Cruz de Tenerife
- Island: La Palma
- Municipality: El Paso; Los Llanos de Aridane

Population (2013)
  - Total: 659

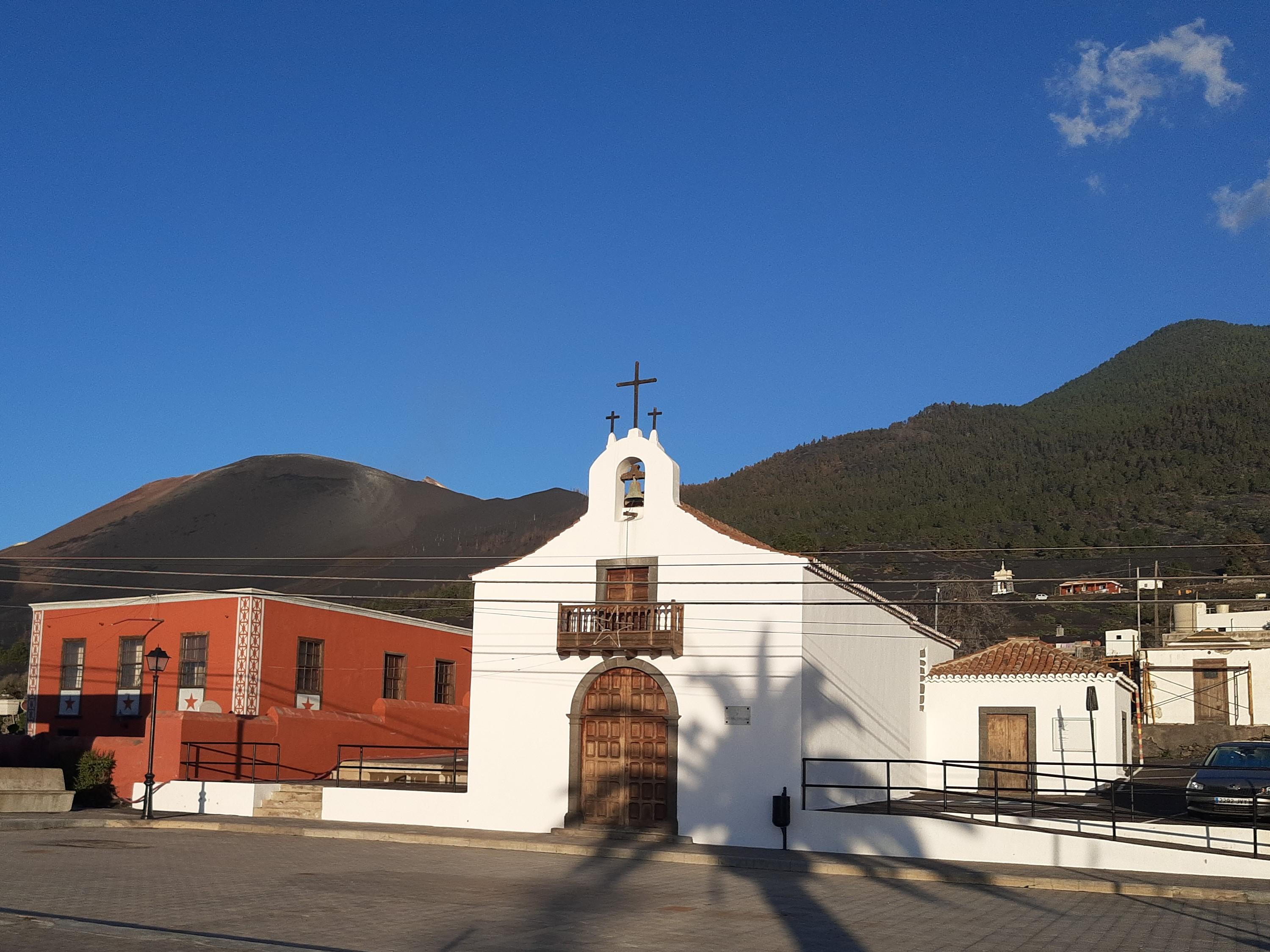
Las Manchas, La Palma, San Nicolás Church

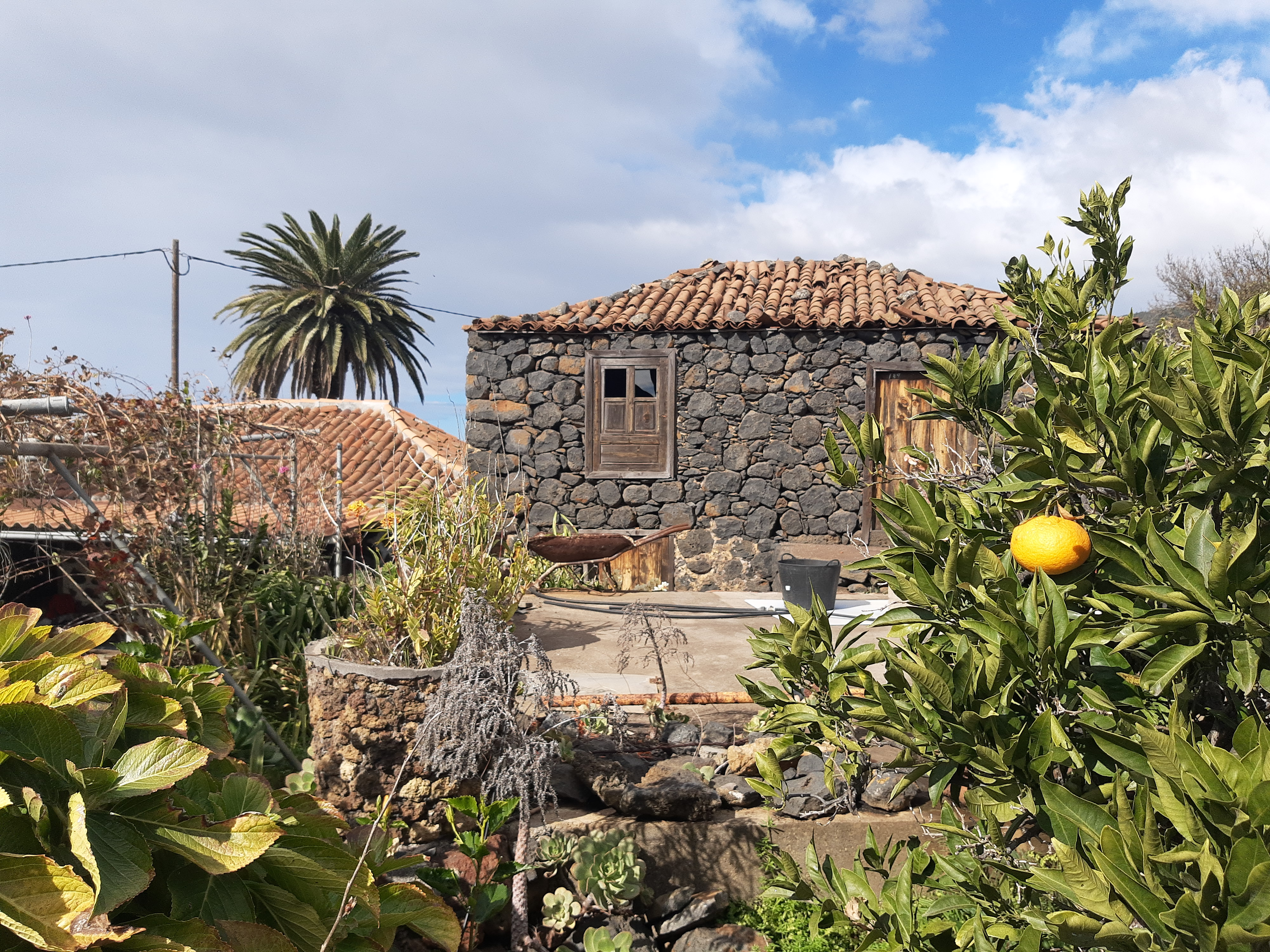
La Palma, path to Time

Las Manchas is a locality in the municipalities of El Paso and Los Llanos de Aridane on the island of La Palma. It is an area of historical and geographical interest, especially due to the volcanic territory in which it is located, being a tourist and cultural focus of the two municipalities. At the end of the 15th century, this area was part of the aboriginal cantons of Tihuya and Tamanca.

== Geography ==
Las Manchas is located in southwest La Palma, between the municipalities of El Paso and Los Llanos de Aridane. It comprises a small territory and borders the neighborhoods of Tajuya, Todoque, Tacande and the municipality of Fuencaliente de La Palma in the south.

== History ==
In Las Manchas, there was already one of the haciendas of the Massieu family in the 17th century; Nicolás Massieu y Vandala also had the Ermita de San Nicolás church built. Since the separation of the municipality El Paso from Los Llanos de Aridane in 1837, the place belongs to both municipalities. The local border runs along the LP-2. The part below (west) the road is officially called Las Manchas de Abajo, the part above becomes San Nicolás de las Manchas.

In 1949, lava from the San Juan volcano buried parts of Las Manchas (and San Nicolás). On 19 September 2021, there was a volcanic eruption near the settlement of Cabeza de Vaca. The eruption initially had two fissures separated by 200 meters and eight mouths. It caused widespread damage, such as the destruction of buildings and facilities close to the area of the first eruption.

== Population ==
Villages or hamlets with population figures as of 1 January 2013, and municipal affiliation:

- Las Manchas de Abajo (186, Los Llanos)
- San Nicolás (248, El Paso)

There are also residents in scattered houses.
