= Fuencaliente de La Palma =

- Municipality
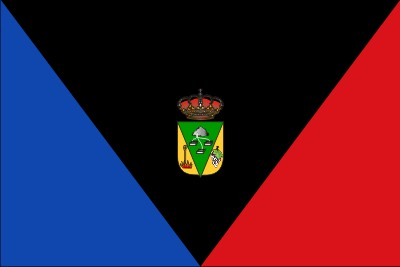
- Flag Coat of arms

- Location in Canary Islands
- Coordinates: 28.49345°N 17.84499°W
- Country: Spain
- Autonomous community: Canary Islands
- Province: Santa Cruz de Tenerife
- Island: La Palma

Area
  - Total: 56.42 km^{2} (21.78 sq mi)
- Elevation: 699 m (2,293 ft)

Population (2025-01-01)
  - Total: 1,965
  - Density: 34.83/km^{2} (90.20/sq mi)

Fuencaliente de La Palma, also Fuencaliente (Spanish meaning "hot spring"), is a municipality in the southern part of the island La Palma in the province of Santa Cruz de Tenerife of the Canary Islands, Spain. The seat of the municipality is the village Los Canarios. It has been the seat since 1837. The population of the municipality is 1,798 (2013) and the area is 56.42 km².

== Geography ==
The municipality of Fuencaliente covers the southern tip of the island La Palma. The landscape is dominated by the volcanic ridge Cumbre Vieja. The southernmost volcano on this ridge, Teneguía, last erupted in 1971. The fertile soil is used for growing grapes (malvasia wine) and bananas. The yearly production of wine from its 800 ha of vineyards is 2 million litres. There are salt evaporation ponds near the lighthouse, on the southernmost point of the island. Fuencaliente is located 23 km southwest of the island capital Santa Cruz de la Palma.

=== Subdivisions ===
- Las Caletas (pop. in 2013: 161)
- Los Canarios (pop: 709)
- El Charco (pop: 30)
- La Fajana (pop: 35)
- Las Indias (pop: 620)
- Los Quemados (pop: 243)

== History ==
Before the arrival of the Spanish in the 15th century, the territory was occupied by the Guanches as Ahenguareme. The origin of the name Fuencaliente is a nearby spring known as Fuente Santa located near the coastline which is now known as Playa de Echentive and was separated by lava and eliminated the springs in the 18th century.

On July 15, 1570, the Forty Martyrs of Brazil, consisting of a group of 32 Portuguese and 8 Spanish Jesuits bound for Brazil, were captured by Huguenot privateers near Fuencaliente and then executed off the coast of Tazacorte.

In 1971, Teneguía created a volcanic eruption and caused some damages to most of the properties. It also added small hectares of land to the island. The Canarian Council of Public Works in collaboration with the municipality had made a sounding in an area where water under the ground is at 60 °C. The objective in the future is that a gallery will be built in the area to extract these waters and take advantage of them in a special pool.

== Sites of interest ==
- Cumbre Vieja, an active volcanic ridge, part of a natural park
- Fuencaliente Lighthouse
- Salinas de Fuencaliente or Salinas Teneguía, salt evaporation ponds
- The volcano Teneguía (438 m)

== Historical population ==
Year	Population
1900	1,650
1910	1,833
1920	1,841
1930	1,966
1940	2,212
1950	2,270
1960	1,943
1970	1,749
1980	1,664
1990	1,822
1991	1,731
1996	1,735
2001	1,833
2002	1,801
2003	1,857
2004	1,877
2005	1,913
2013	1,798

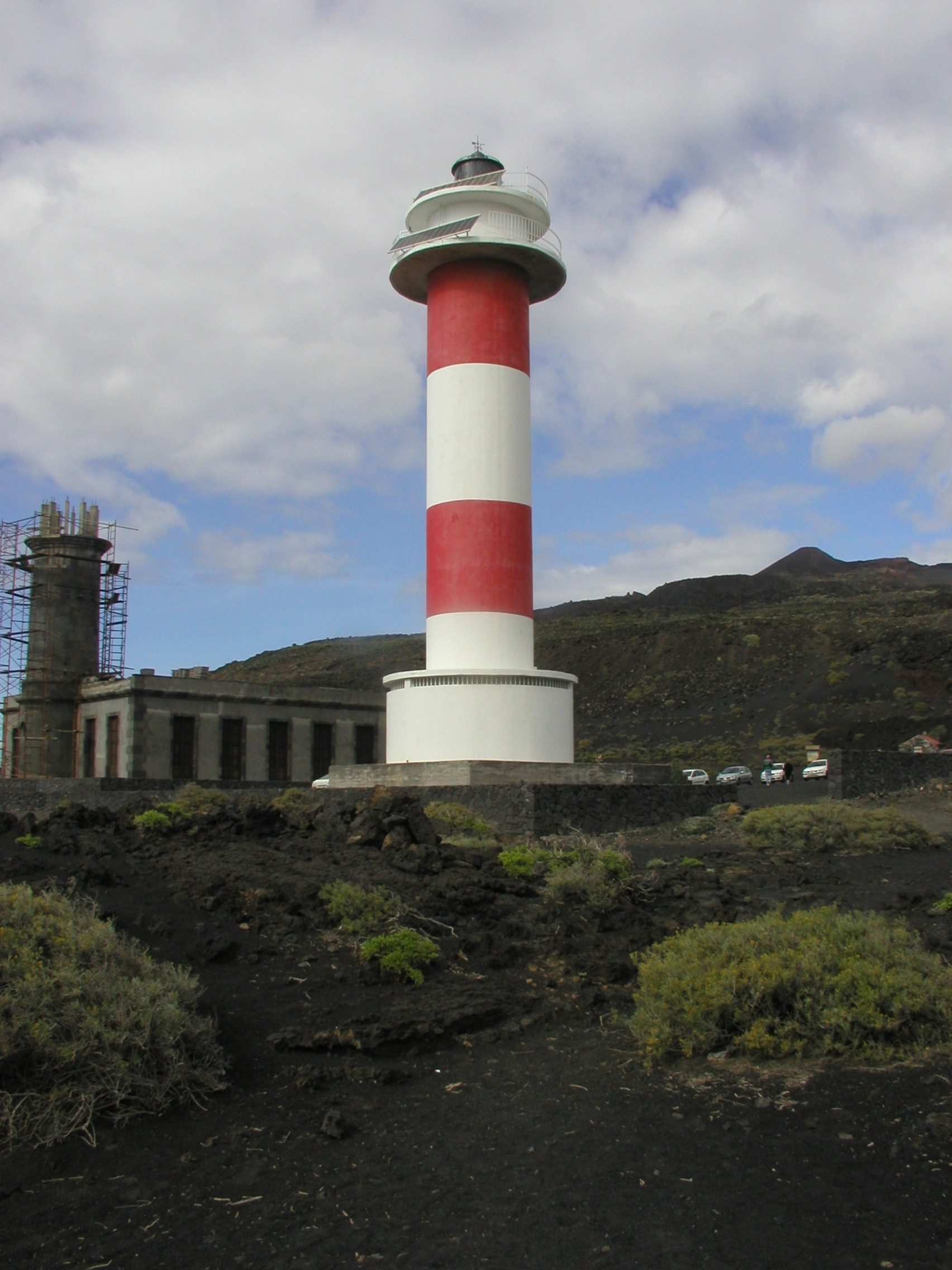
Faro de Fuencaliente

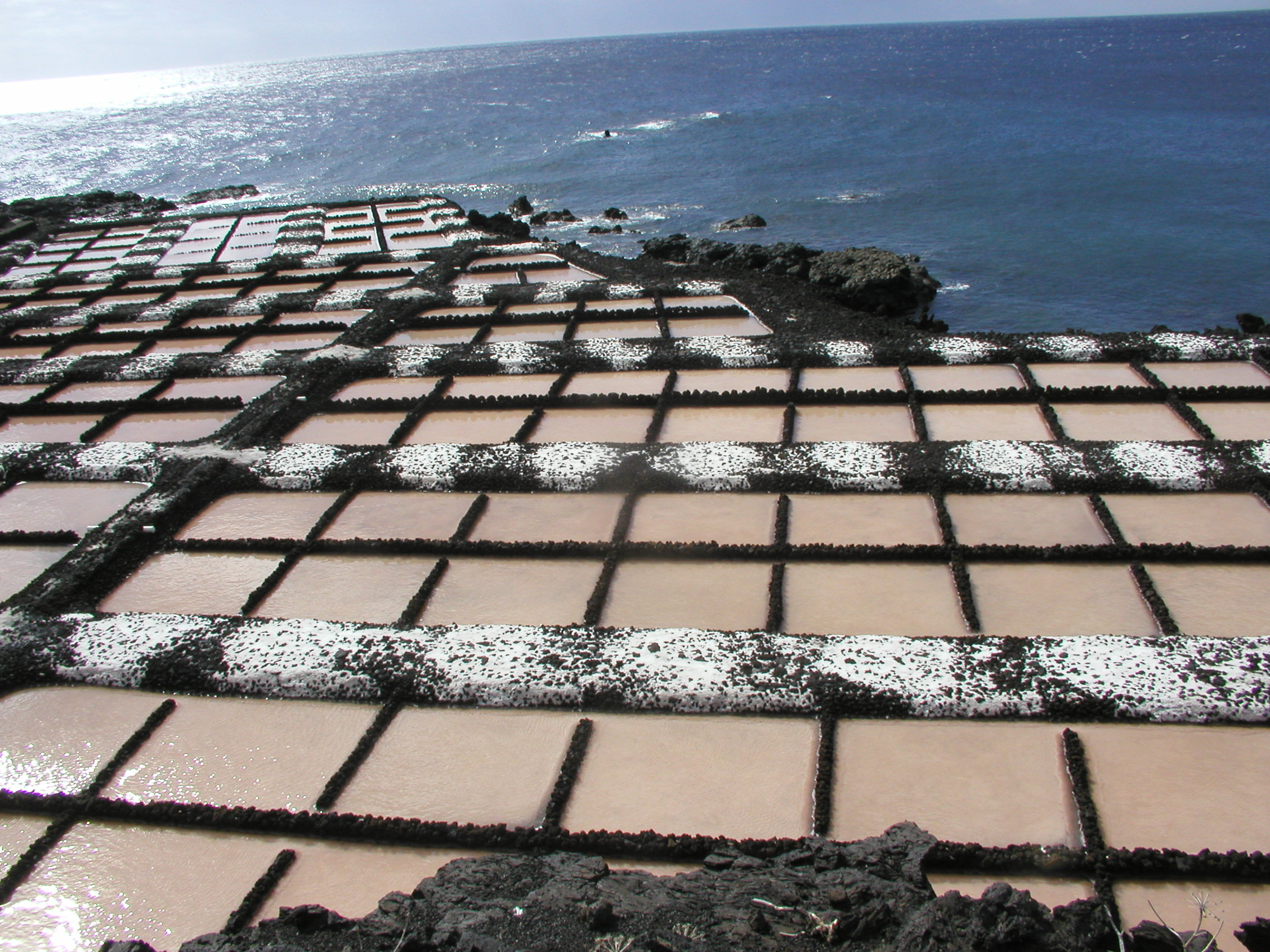
Salinas Teneguía

== See also ==
- List of municipalities in Santa Cruz de Tenerife
