= Las Manchas, Tenerife =

Las Manchas
- locality
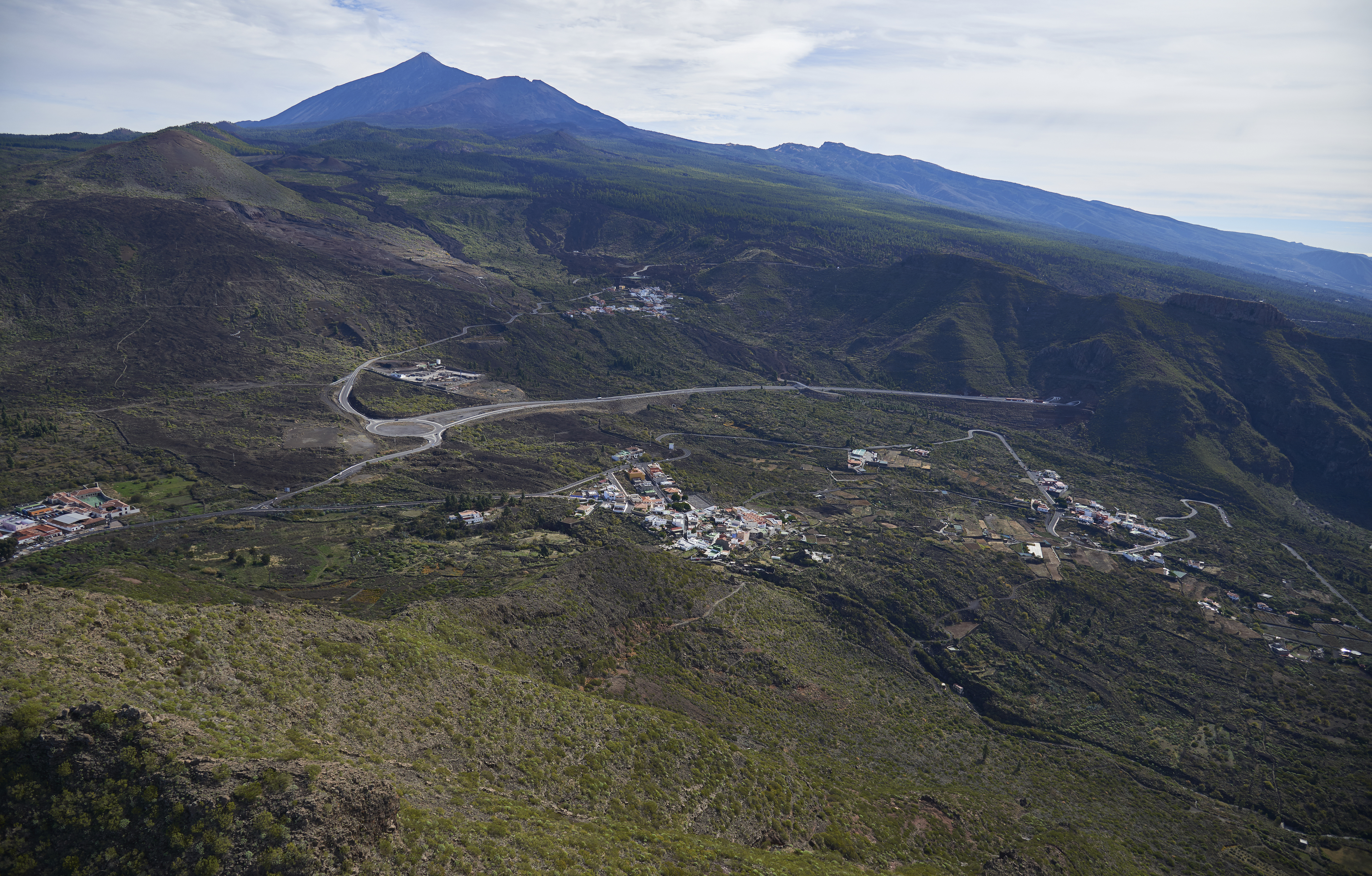

- Location in the Canary Islands
- Coordinates: 28°17′00″N 16°48′05″W
- Country: Spain
- Community: Canary Islands
- Province: Santa Cruz de Tenerife
- Island: Tenerife
- Municipality: Santiago del Teide

Population (2020)
  - Total: 142

Las Manchas is a locality in the municipality of Santiago del Teide in the island of Tenerife.

== Geography ==
Las Manchas is located at an average altitude of 980 meters above sea level and is located two kilometers from the municipal capital. It has a parish church dedicated to the Virgen del Pilar, a cultural center, a municipal sports center, a playground and a public square. Part of the locality is included in the Chinyero Nature Reserve.
