= Teneguía =

Volcano on La Palma (Canary Islands)

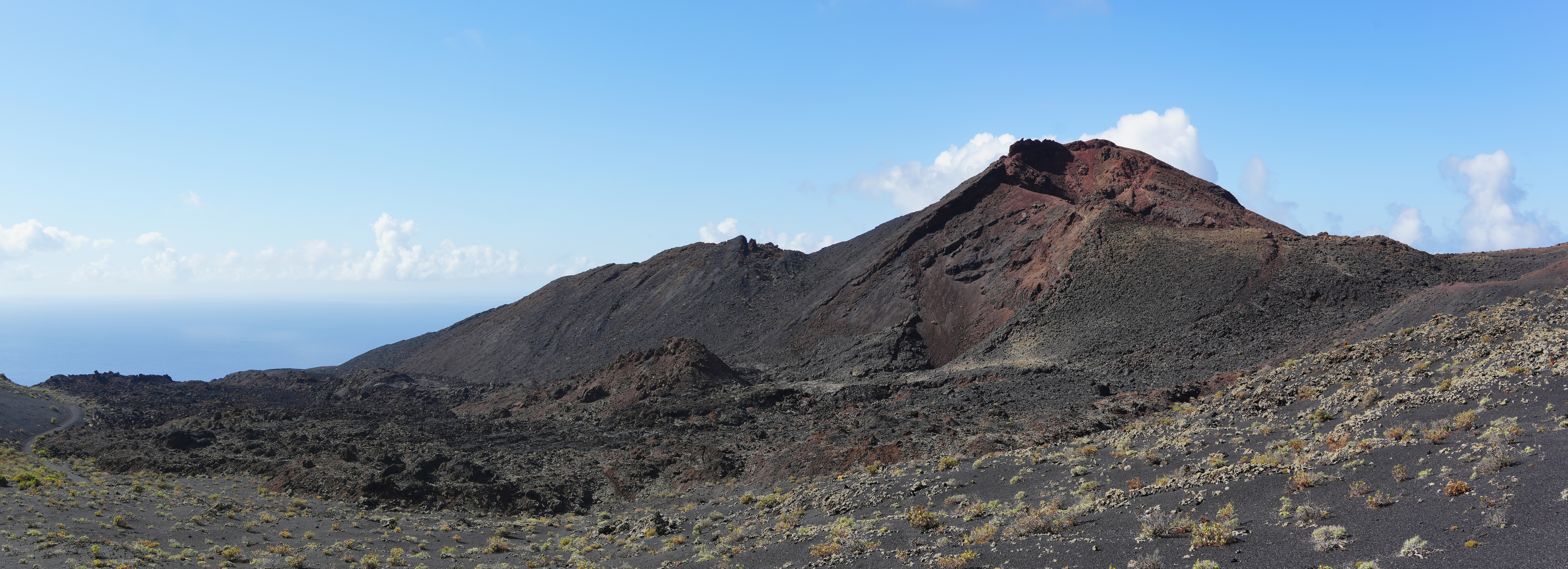
- The monogenetic cone of Teneguia in 2022.

Highest point
- Elevation: 428 m (1,404 ft)
- Coordinates: 28°28′18″N 17°51′7″W

Geography
- Location: La Palma, Canary Islands, Spain

Geology
- Mountain type: Cinder cone
- Last eruption: October 26 to November 28, 1971

Teneguía (Spanish pronunciation: [teneˈɣia]) is a monogenetic cinder cone – a volcanic vent which has been active once (in 1971) and has had further seismic activity. It is situated on the island of La Palma, one of the Canary Islands, and is located at the southern end of the sub-aerial section of the Cumbre Vieja volcano, of which Teneguía is just one of several vents.

== 1971 eruption ==
This vent was the source of a subaerial volcanic eruption in Spain, which occurred from October 26 to November 28, 1971. Earthquakes preceded the eruption. A tourist died as a result of severe intoxication caused by gas inhalation near the volcano after breaking the security cordon established to protect the population. The eruption caused some property damage to roads, crops, and homes. It also destroyed a beach, though a new one was later formed by natural means. Densely populated zones were not affected. The vent has since become an attraction for tourists and forms part of the Monumento Natural de Los Volcanes de Teneguía. Until the 2011–12 El Hierro eruption, this was the last volcanic eruption in Spain, and until the 2021 Cumbre Vieja volcanic eruption, the last volcanic eruption in Spain on land.

== See also ==
- 2021 Cumbre Vieja volcanic eruption
- 2011–12 El Hierro eruption
- 1949 Cumbre Vieja eruption
- Geology of the Canary Islands
