= Los Llanos de Aridane =

- City
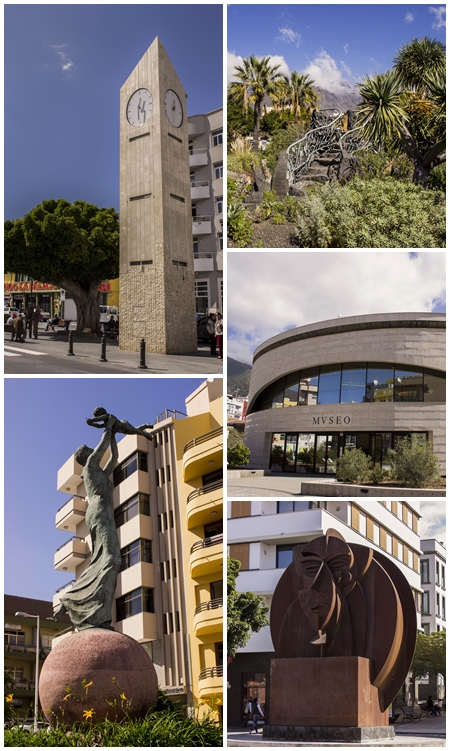
- Top left: Los Llanos de Aridane Clock Tower; Top right: Antonio Gomez Felipe Park; Middle right: Benahorita Archaeological Museum; Bottom left: La Madre Monument in Carlos Francisco Lorenzo Navarro Square; Bottom right: El Guanche Monument in Dr. Fleming Street

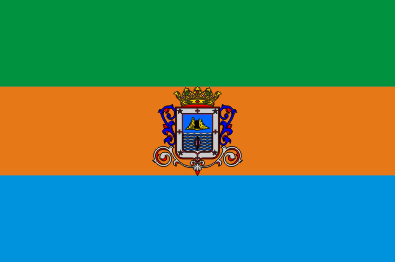
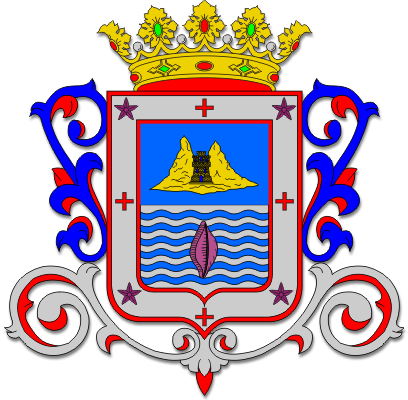
- Flag Coat of arms

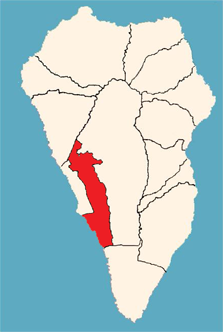

- Location in Canary Islands
- Coordinates: 28°39′N 17°54′W
- Country: Spain
- Region: Canary Islands
- Province: Santa Cruz de Tenerife
- Island: La Palma

Government
  - Mayor: Noelia Garcia Leal (PP)

Area
  - Total: 35.79 km^{2} (13.82 sq mi)
- Elevation: 340 m (1,120 ft)

Population (2025-01-01)
  - Total: 20,582
  - Density: 575.1/km^{2} (1,489/sq mi)
- Demonym: Llanense
- Postal code: 38760
- Website: www.aridane.org

Los Llanos de Aridane is a municipality of the Province of Santa Cruz de Tenerife, Canary Islands, Spain. It is located in the west of the island of La Palma, in the Aridane Valley. With 20,930 inhabitants (2013) it is the most populous municipality of La Palma.

== History ==
In August 1812, the town of Los Llanos was established. At that time it also included the towns El Paso, Tazacorte and Argual. In 1837, El Paso was separated from Los Llanos. In 1925 Tazacorte, which was then the most populous and most economically developed town of the municipality, was separated from Los Llanos.

== Geography ==
The municipality covers an area of 35.79 square kilometres (13.82 sq mi). Its altitude is 325 meters (1,066 ft) above sea level and has a coastal length of 6.43 km (4 mi). Its main neighborhoods are: Los Llanos, Argual, Montaña Tenisca, El Roque, Los Barros, La Laguna, Todoque, Las Manchas de Abajo, Puerto Naos, Triana, Retamar Jedey and El Remo. The municipality is one of the economic engines of the island with an economy based on bananas and tourism.

== Sites of interest ==
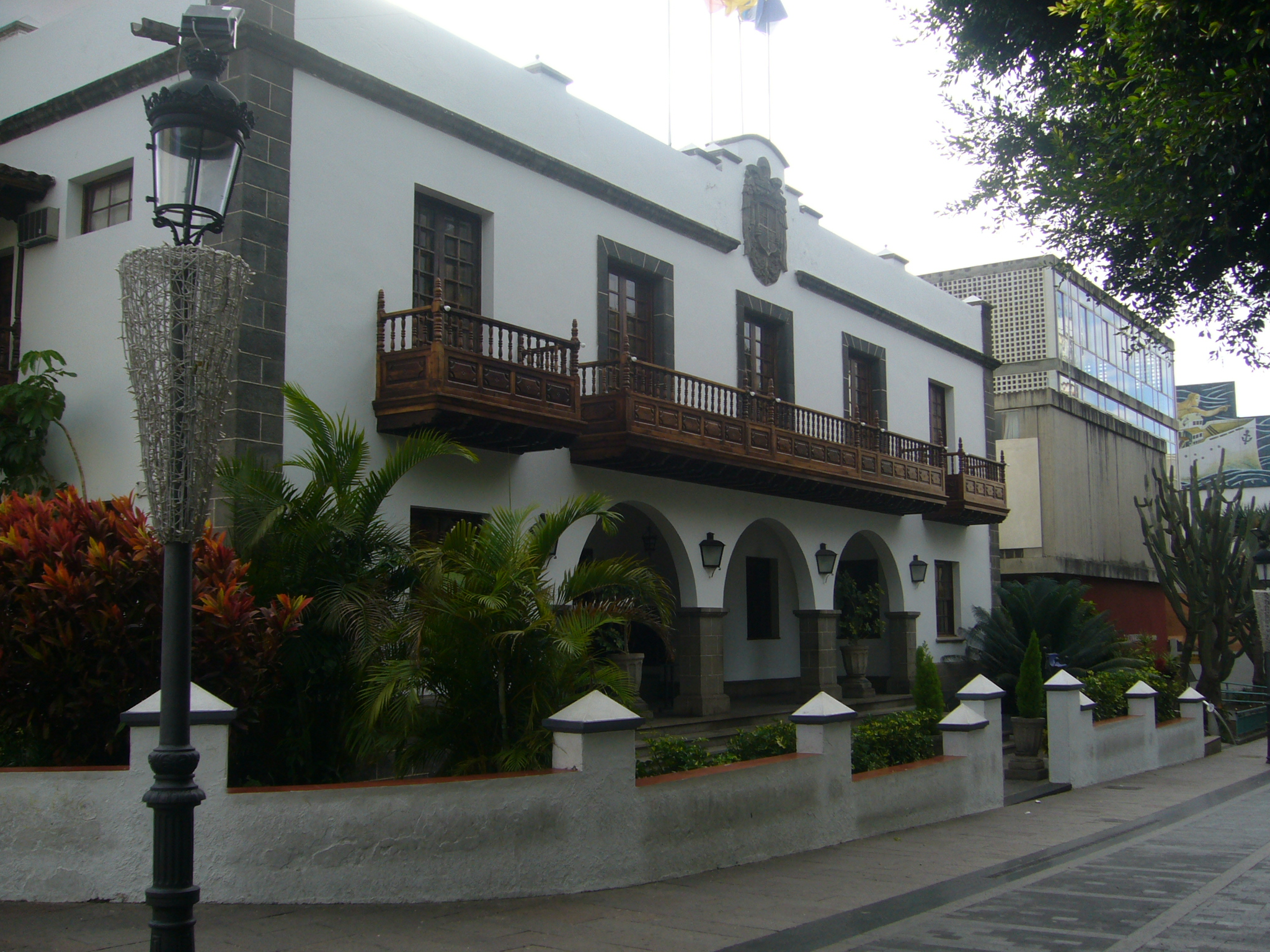
Façade of City Hall

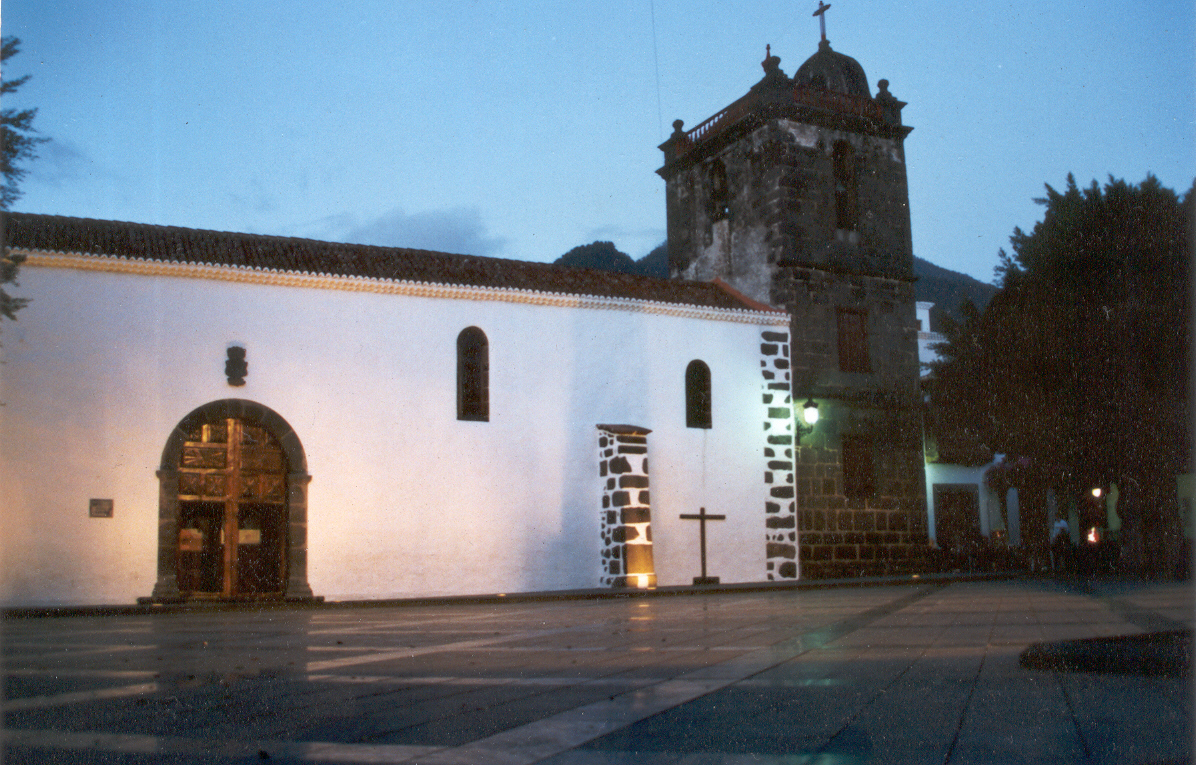
Plaza España in Los Llanos de Aridane, with the Nuestra Señora de los Remedios church

- City Hall: Was initially located in a traditional house located in the place now occupied by the modern House of Culture. The present building of the City Hall marking regionalist style by the architect Tomas Machado, was begun in 1945. The façade projecting balconies overhanging open and covered by tiles and on the latter, a mullioned window with lattice Mudejar. The hall saves seven oil paintings by Antonio Palma Suarez Gonzalez, which reproduces historical events and scenes.
- Plaza de España: Spain Square and its surroundings are the administrative center of life, recreational, historic place must be visited and a meeting place and rest for all citizens and visitors, where they are most representative buildings of this city. The Plaza is located in the heart of the town, and the recent renewal of pavement (year 2,000) and pedestrianization of surrounding streets has prompted the dynamism of the same in the lives of its people. In its vicinity are 11 stunning Indian laurels (Ficus microcarpa) which together with royal palm trees were brought from Cuba by migrants in the mid-nineteenth century to beautify the ride of your hometown. These laurels have become a symbol of the city and inspiration of poets and travelers, being undoubtedly the most long-lived on the island.

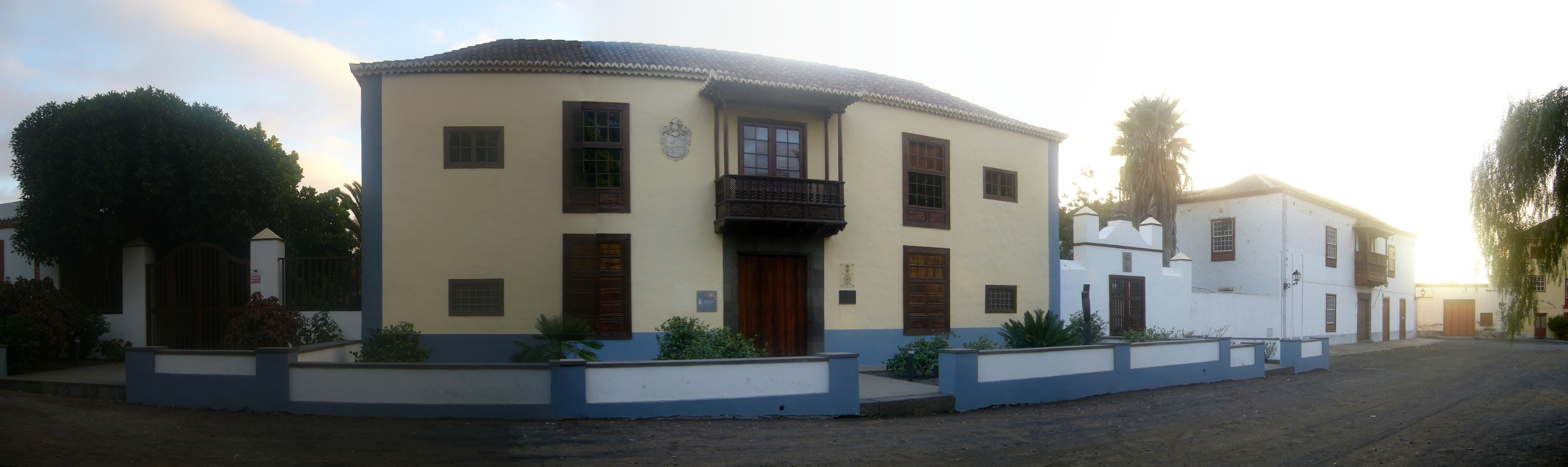
Massieu Mansion, in Llano de Argual

- Llano de Argual: A place where economic history of Aridane Valley began and it speaks of the splendor of an era, thanks to the use of the waters of La Caldera, to irrigate the cane fields before, and now the banana zones. They are in El Llano four old mansions of the seventeenth and eighteenth century: Ontanilla Velez home, Massieu Van Dalle house (property of Cabildo Isular and converted into an exhibition center, showroom and tourist information office), Poggio Maldonado home and the house of Sotomayor (the oldest preserved).
- Plaza de Los Cuatro Caminos: This Plaza or mirador designed by the versatile islander artist Luis Morera, was made between 1993 and 1996, and noted for its beautiful mosaic work in which banks have built pergolas with ceramic tiled chips, a stage made of lava stones and battering rams towns of plants belonging to the Canarian flora.

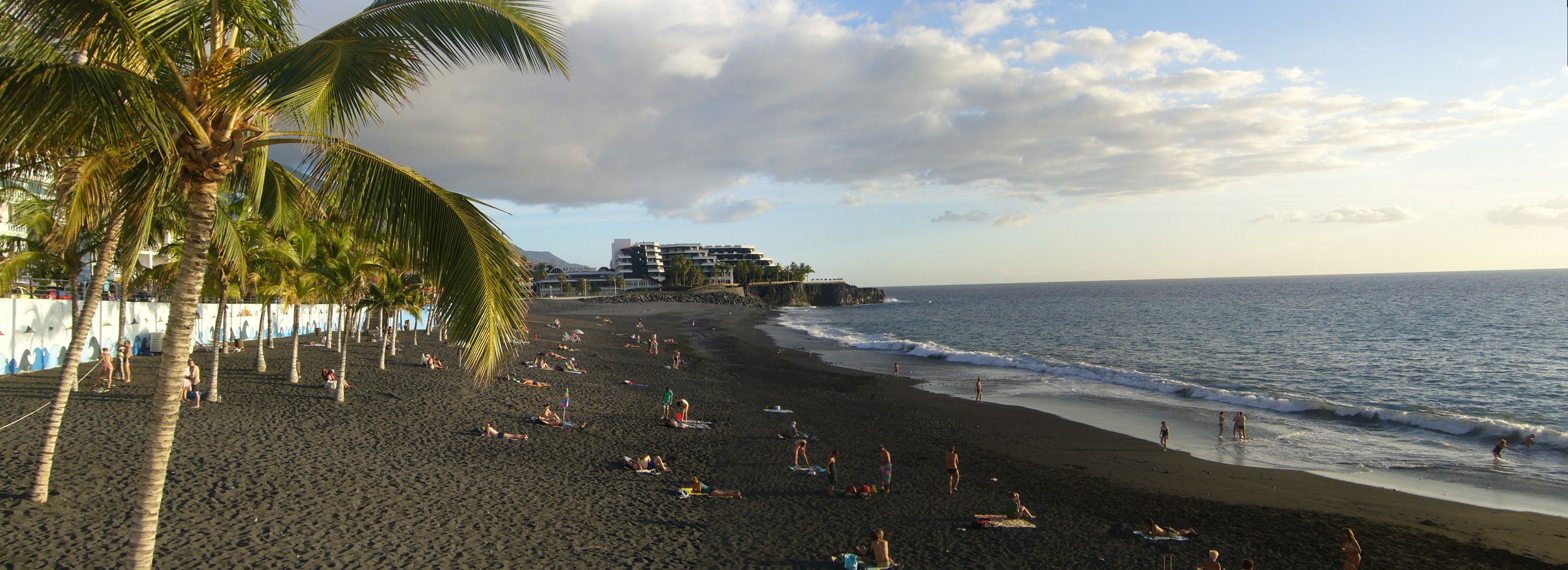
Puerto Naos beach

- Puerto Naos beach: It is situated in the best area to the west of the island, with mild temperatures throughout the year, which enabled it to obtain the Blue Flag award thanks to its services and crystalline waters. It has a boulevard that runs along the entire natural beach of black sand, where people can stroll or sit in some bar-terrace to watch the sea, the beach or a beautiful sunset to sunset.
- Charco Verde beach: A black sand cove south of Puerto Naos, and where there is an ancient hot spring which once was used for medicinal purposes. It won the Blue Flag award for the first time in 2009.

== Education ==
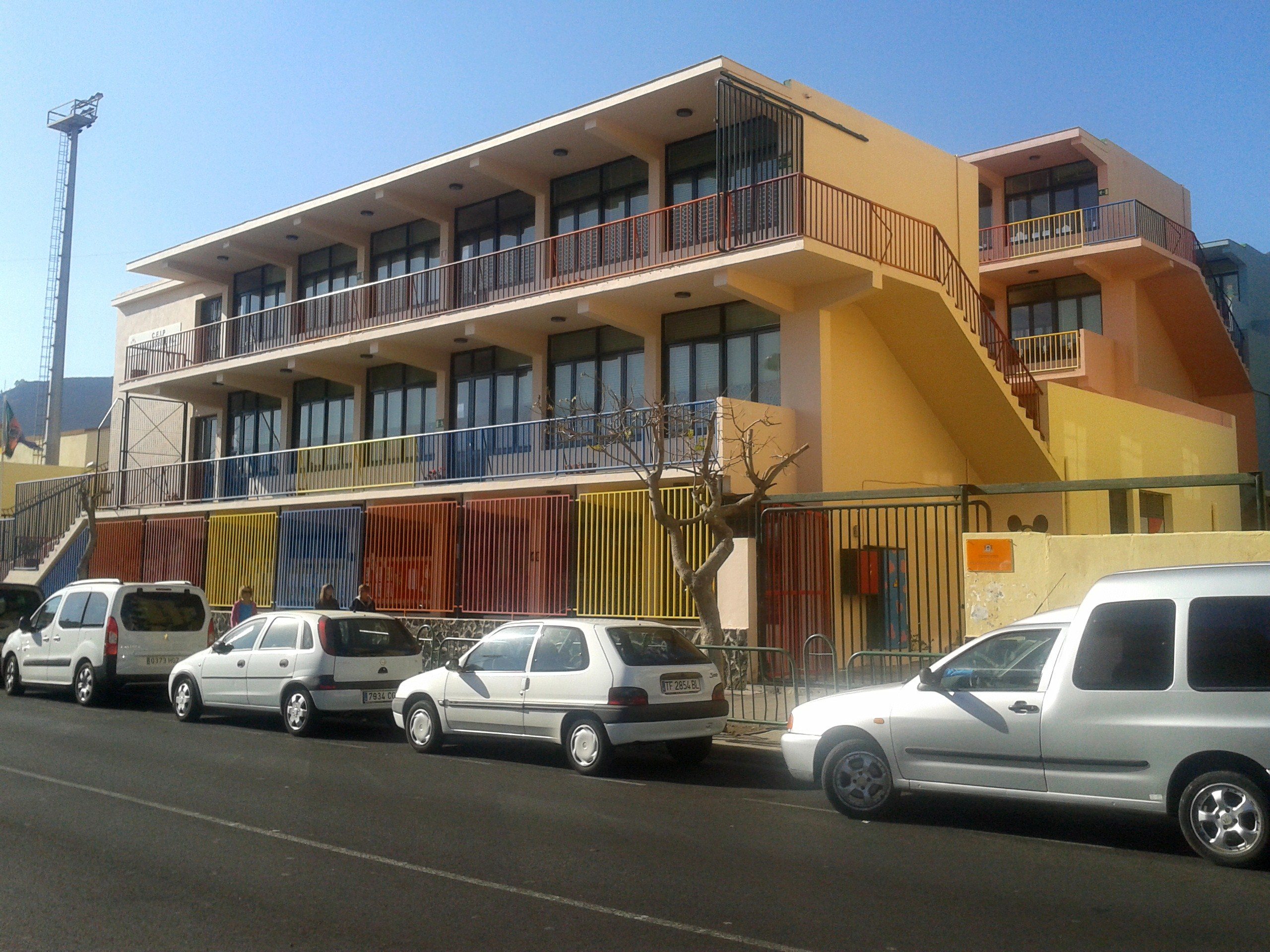
C.E.I.P. 25 Years of Peace

The municipality has an extensive educational system, both primary and secondary school and university. The public network of childhood education centers and primary and secondary schools depends on the Ministry of Education, Universities, Culture and Sports of the Canary Government. Among the primary schools are: CEIP El Roque, C.E.I.P. Mayantigo, C.E.I.P. Puerto Naos, C.E.I.P. Tajuya, C.E.I.P. Todoque, C.E.I.P. 25 Years of Peace, C.E.I.P. Las Manchas and C.E.I.P. Los Campitos.

In addition to two secondary schools, IES Eusebio Barreto Lorenzo and I.E.S. Jose Maria Perez Pulido are the Agricultural Training School in Los Llanos, the College of Special Education Acerina Princess and Official Language School of Los Llanos. The university presence in Los Llanos is composed of the National University of Distance Education (UNED)

There is only one private center in the municipality, the Holy Family of Nazareth School offers childhood, primary and secondary education.

== Libraries ==
Los Llanos and has 2 libraries, the main one in the House of Culture of the municipality and the other in the Cultural Center of Argual. They share resources, effort, knowledge and experience in order to improve the educational and cultural city.

== Historical population ==
Year	Population
1991	16,189
1996	17,994
2001	17,720
2002	20,238
2003	20,001
2004	19,659
2013	20,930

== See also ==
- List of municipalities in Santa Cruz de Tenerife
