= Caldera de Taburiente National Park =

National park in the Canary Islands, Spain

- Parque Nacional de la Caldera de Taburiente
- IUCN category II (national park)
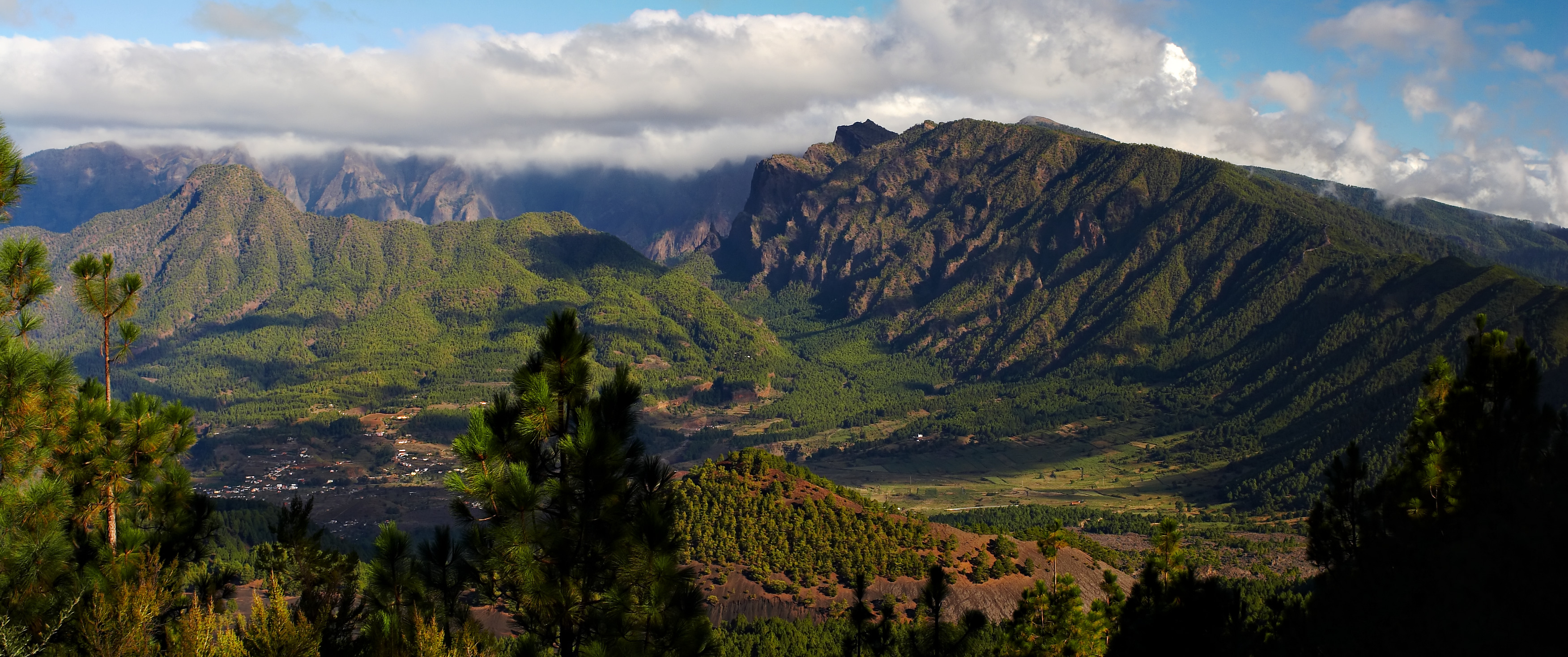
- Outer view of the caldera rim
- Location of Caldera de Taburiente
- Location: La Palma, Canary Islands, Spain
- Coordinates: 28°43′N 17°52′W
- Established: 1954

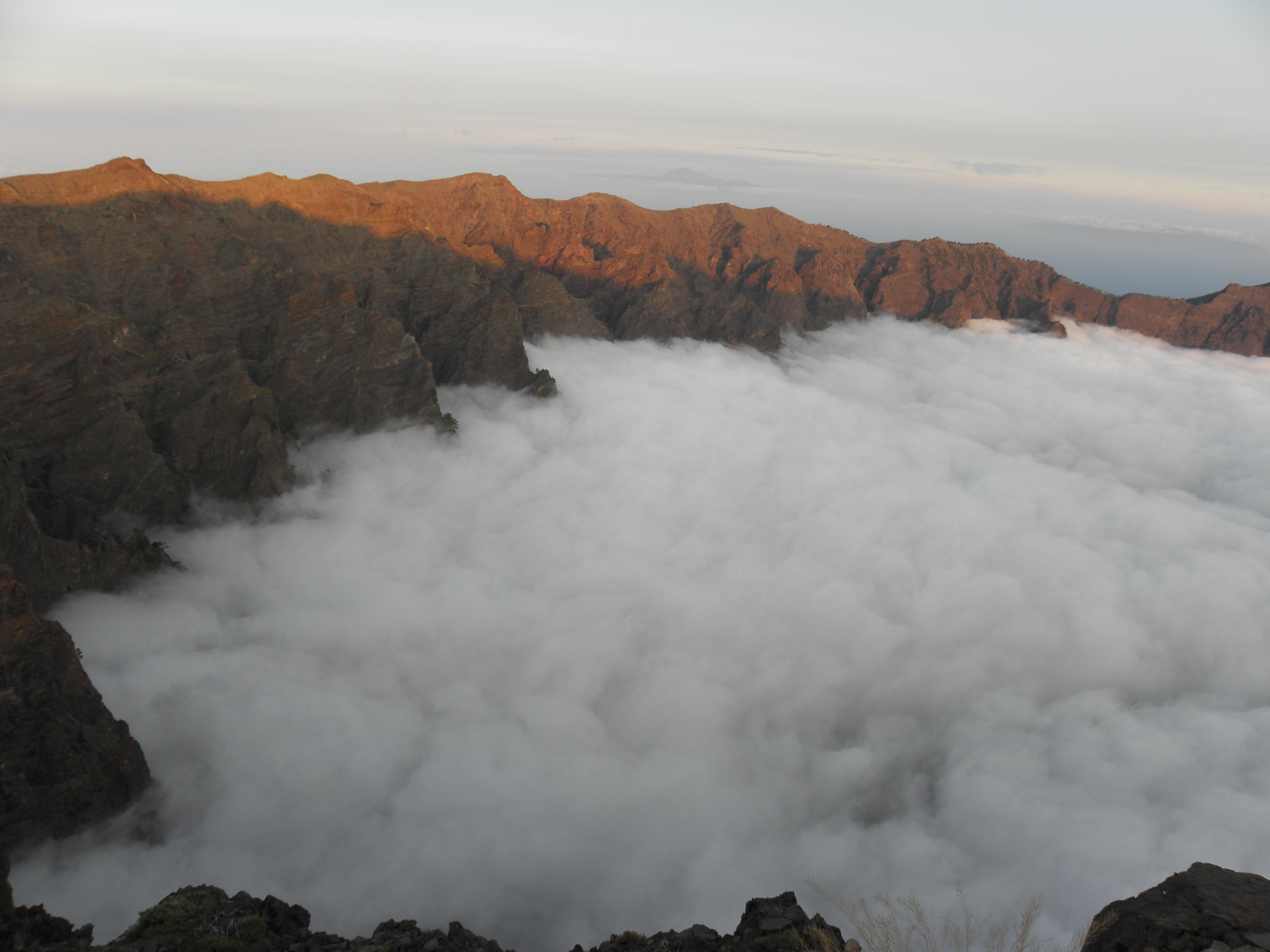
Clouds covering a part of the caldera

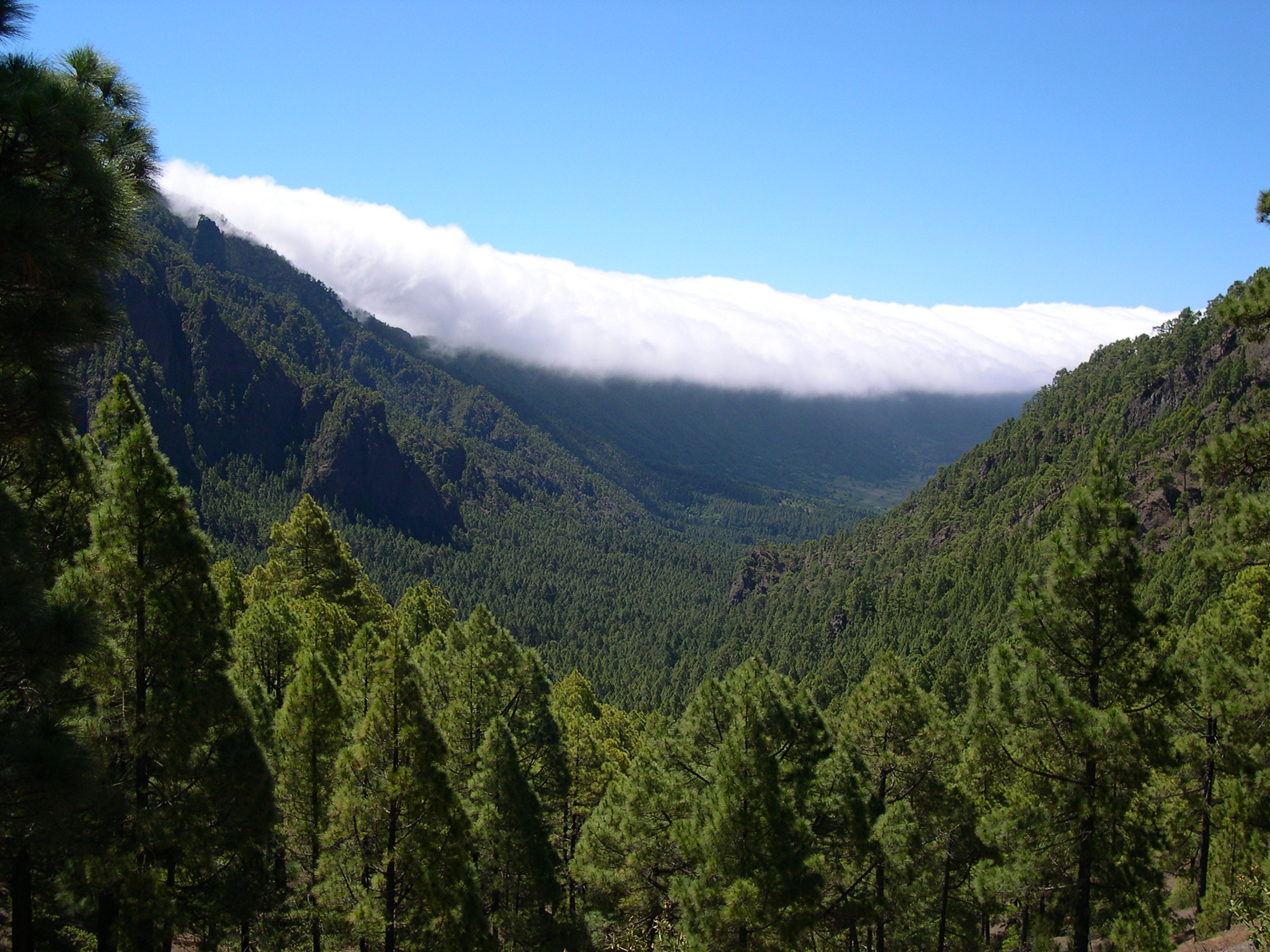
Looking from the edge of the caldera into a tributary valley

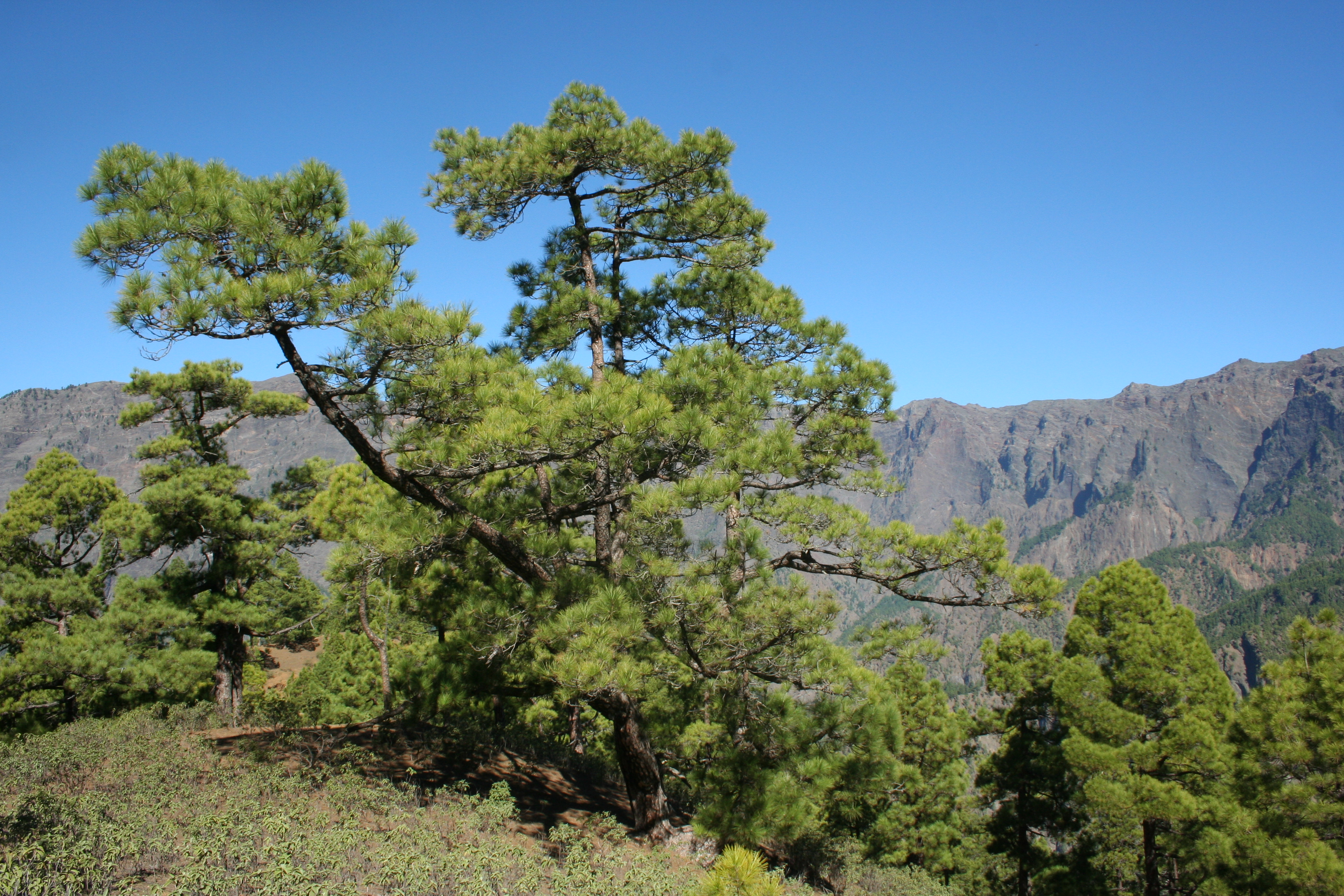
Pinus canariensis, Caldera de Taburiente

Caldera de Taburiente National Park (Spanish: Parque Nacional de la Caldera de Taburiente) is a national park on the island of La Palma, Canary Islands, Spain. It contains the Caldera de Taburiente, which dominates the northern part of the island, and was designated as a national park in 1954. The telescopes of the Roque de los Muchachos Observatory are situated very close to the summit.

== Toponym ==
The word caldera means cauldron in Spanish. Taburiente is not a Spanish word but derives from the Guanche language and means "plain, level".

== Geography ==
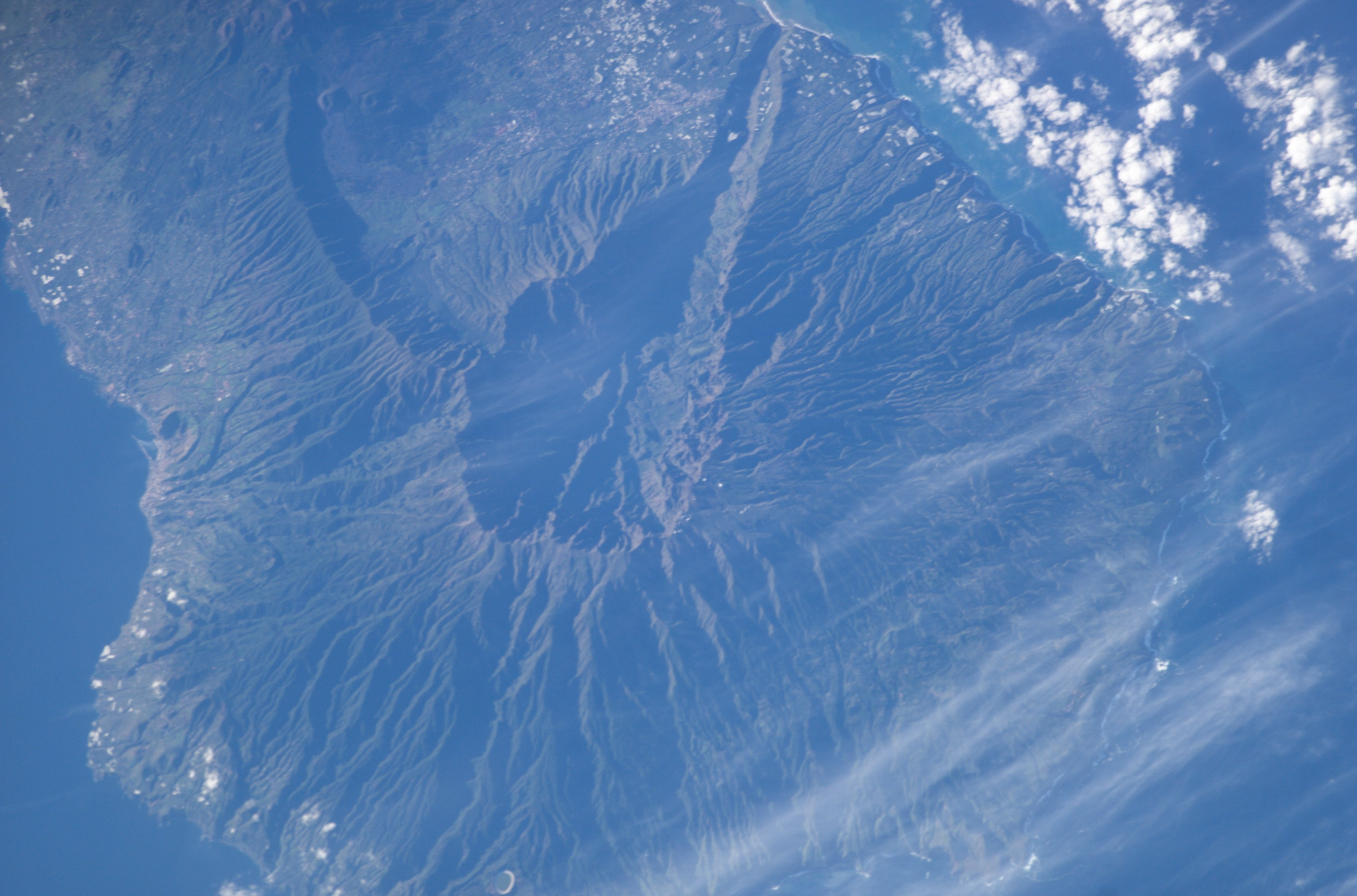
A satellite picture of the Caldera de Taburiente. Barranco de las Angustias is in the upper right and Cumbre Nueva is in the upper left. (South is above and north is below.)

The Caldera de Taburiente is a topographic depression about 10 km across, and in places the walls tower 2000 m over the caldera floor. The highest point is the Roque de los Muchachos on the northern wall, at 2426 m altitude, which can be reached by road. The Cumbrecita is at a lower point in the south-eastern part of the caldera's rim. In the south-west, the caldera opens to the sea, through a river-floored valley called the Barranco de las Angustias. (The river is the only permanent stream in the Canary Islands). The Cumbre Nueva is a ridge that starts at the caldera and continues to the south.

== Geology ==
The Caldera de Taburiente is an erosion caldera that has been formed by a landslide followed by erosion, without volcanic eruption; therefore, it is not a collapse caldera formed by withdrawal of magma from under a volcano during a volcanic eruption with subsequent collapse of the unsupported mountain summit.

Starting about 4 million years ago, a set of three successive, overlapping shield volcanoes gradually formed in what is now north La Palma. Together, they formed the "Northern Shield", a volcanic mountain that was about 20 km across and 3,000 m high. The southwest flank of the Northern Shield became unstable, about 525,000 years ago, and the mountain's flank collapsed laterally in a debris avalanche landslide that moved the collapsed flank rocks downslope towards the coast and even onto the ocean floor. The valley created by the landslide was then enlarged by erosion.

=== IUGS geological heritage site ===
In respect of its importance in the development of volcanology, 'Taburiente volcanic Caldera' was included by the International Union of Geological Sciences (IUGS) in its assemblage of 100 'geological heritage sites' around the world in a listing published in October 2022. The organisation defines an 'IUGS Geological Heritage Site' as 'a key place with geological elements and/or processes of international scientific relevance, used as a reference, and/or with a substantial contribution to the development of geological sciences through history.'

== Wildlife ==
The main flora of the national park comprises a large forest of Canary Island Pine, with a population of the endangered Canary Islands Juniper also present. The park has been recognised as an Important Bird Area (IBA) by BirdLife International because it supports populations of laurel pigeons, red-billed choughs and Atlantic canaries.

== Human history ==
During the Spanish conquest of the Canary Islands in the 15th century, the caldera was the site of the last stand of the indigenous people of the archipelago, a branch of the Guanches known as Benahoaritas. It proved impregnable to the invading Spaniards, and they only defeated the Benahoarita by luring their leader out on the pretext of holding talks.

In 1815, German geologist Christian Leopold von Buch visited the Canary Islands, during which he visited the island of Tenerife where he was taken to the Caldera de las Cañadas. He visited La Palma after he had been to Tenerife, and in his journal he makes it clear that he was able to distinguish between a caldera of volcanic origin and the erosional origins for the caldera Taburiente. Following his return to Germany he published his journal and he introduced the term caldera to the geological vocabulary.

In the 1830s, the caldera provided inspiration for some art that combined a study of geology with botany, such as the work of Sabin Berthelot and Felix-Achille St. Aulaire.

== See also ==
- Idafe Rock
