= Santa Cruz de Tenerife =

- Municipality
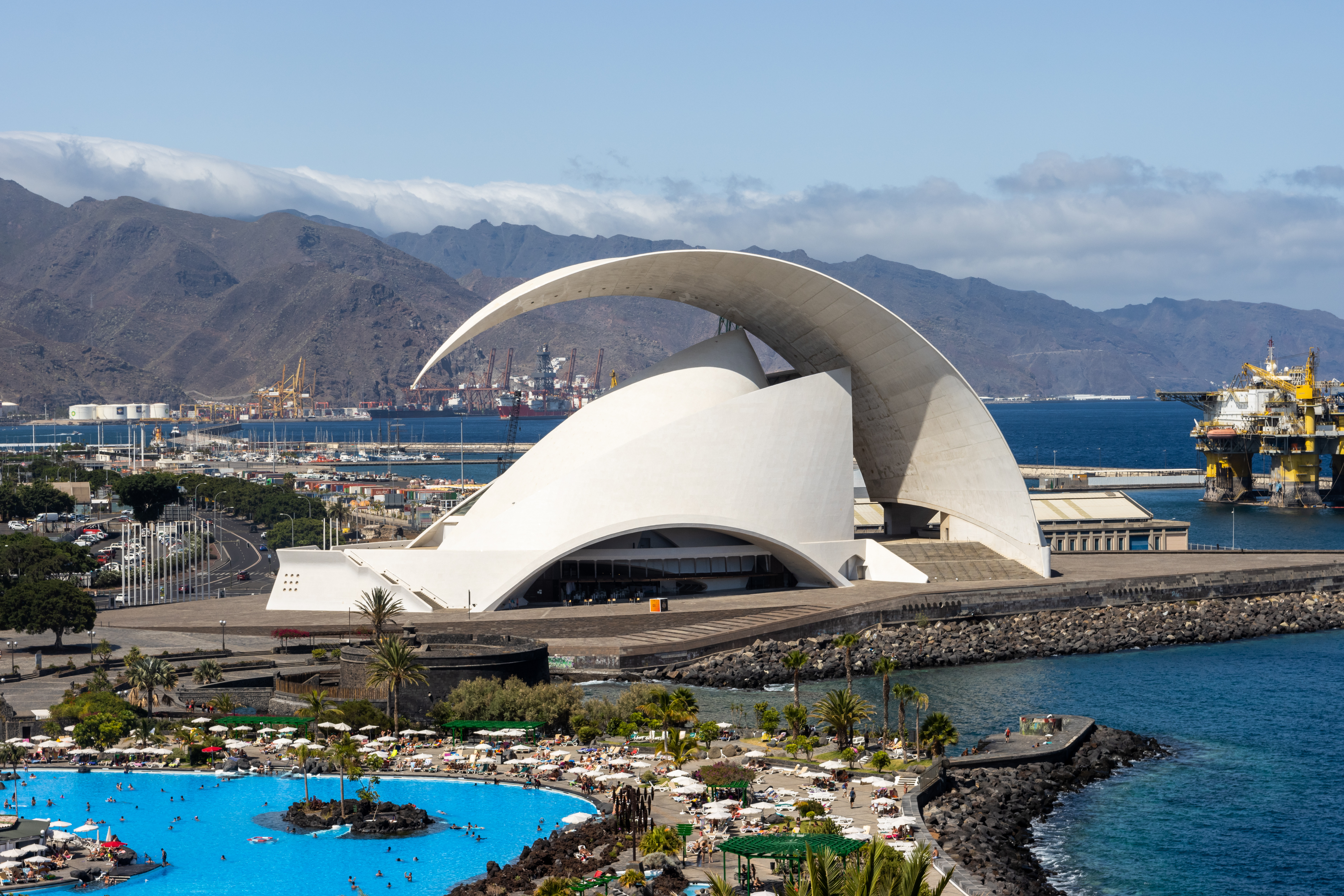
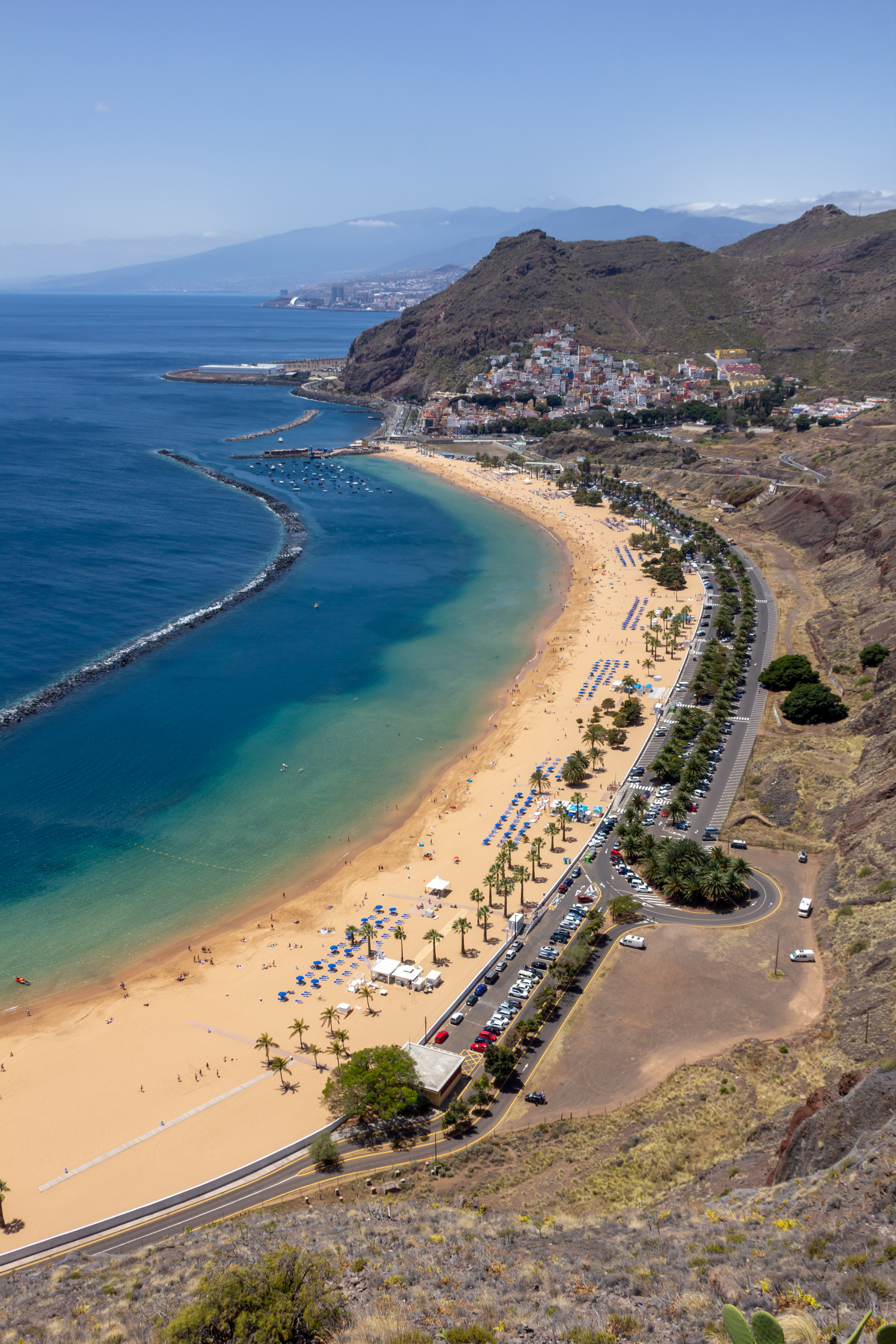
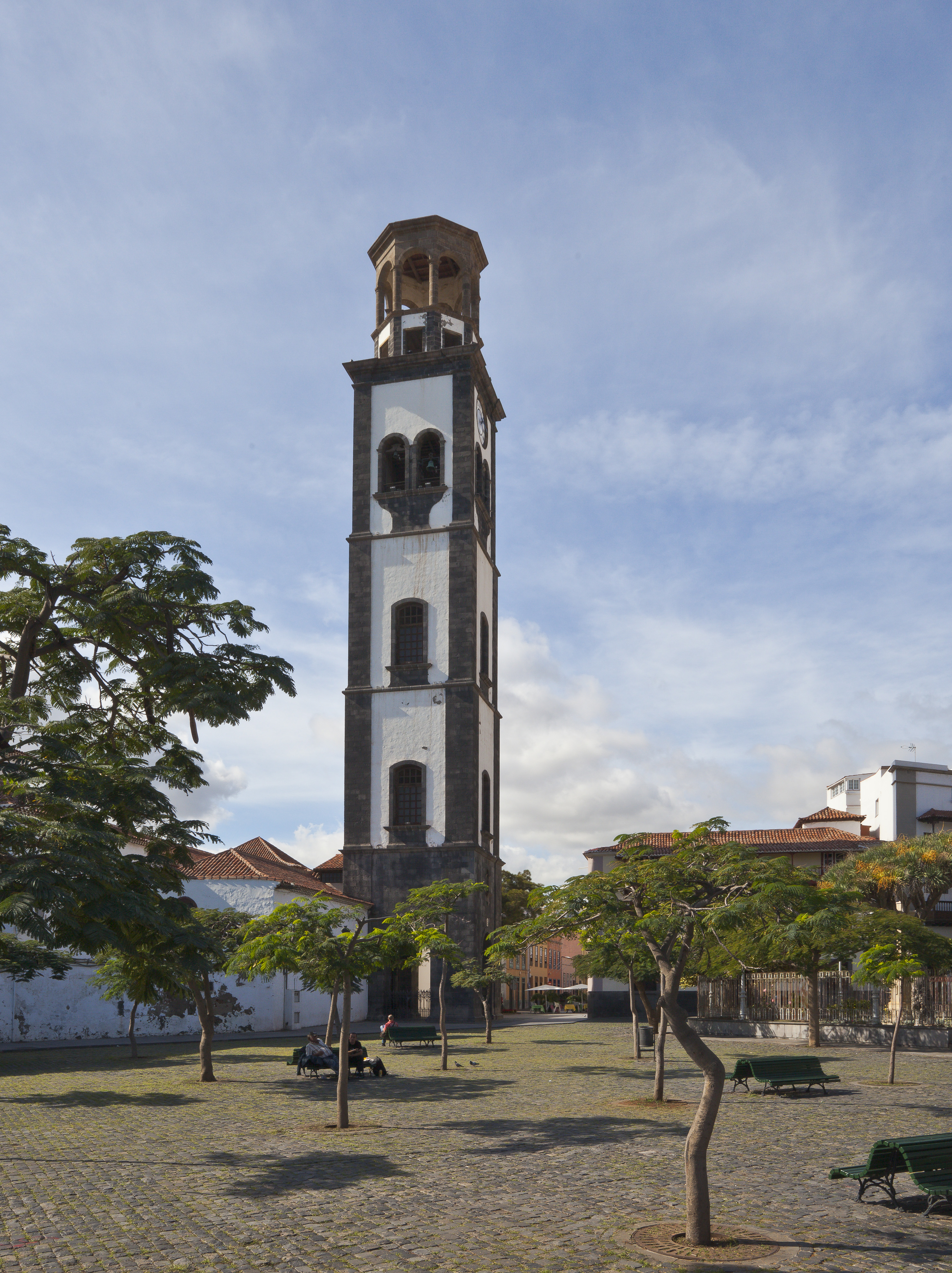
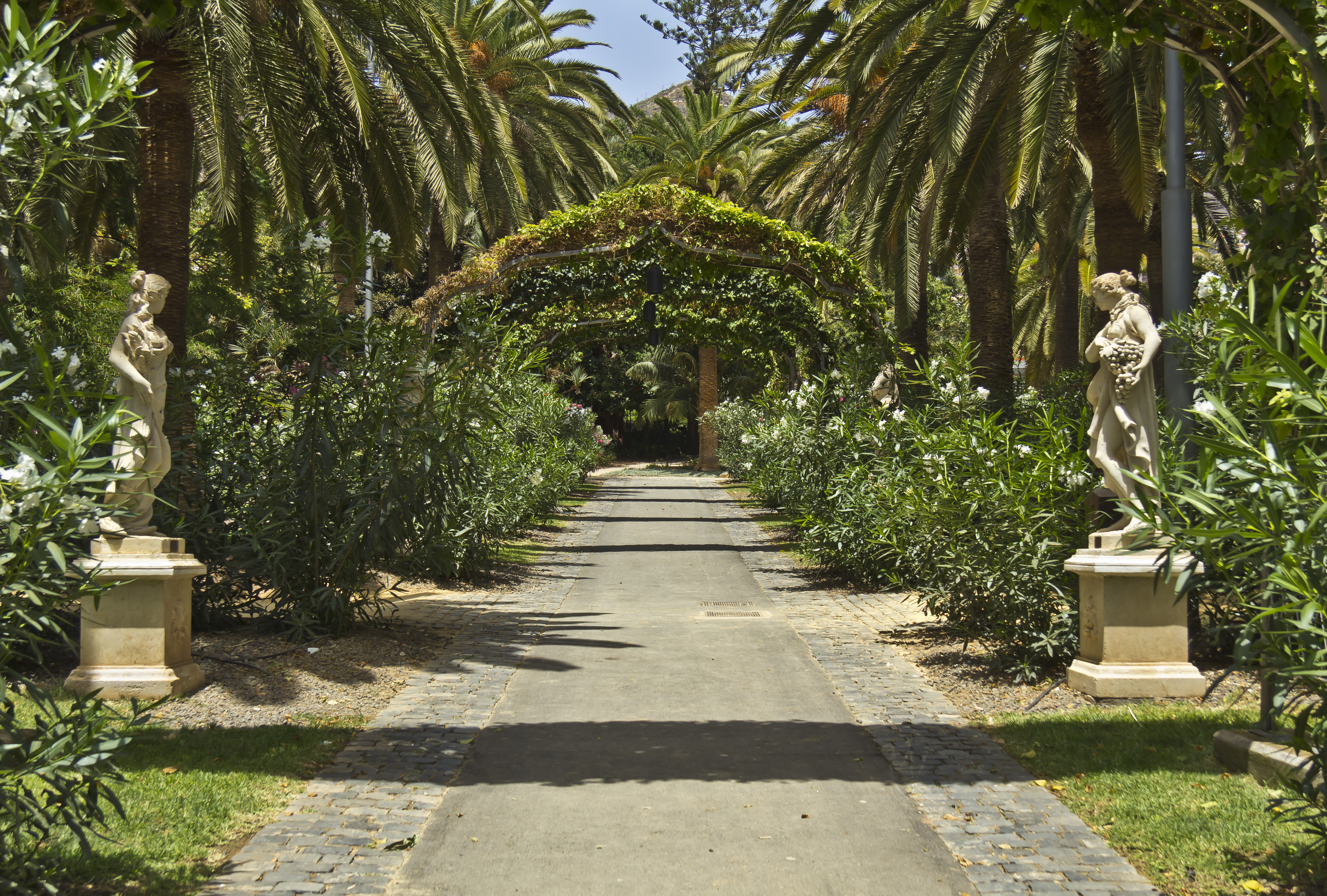
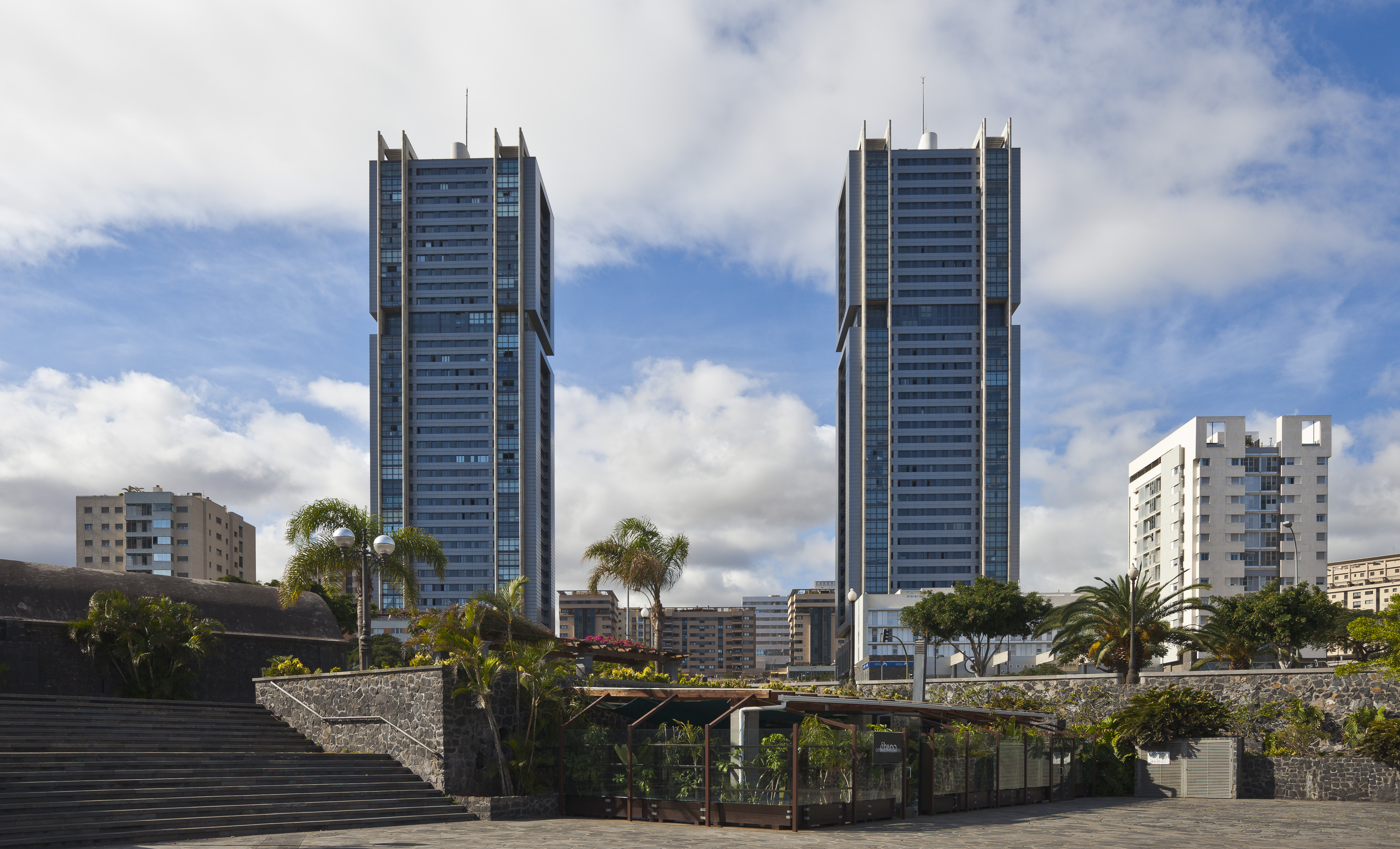
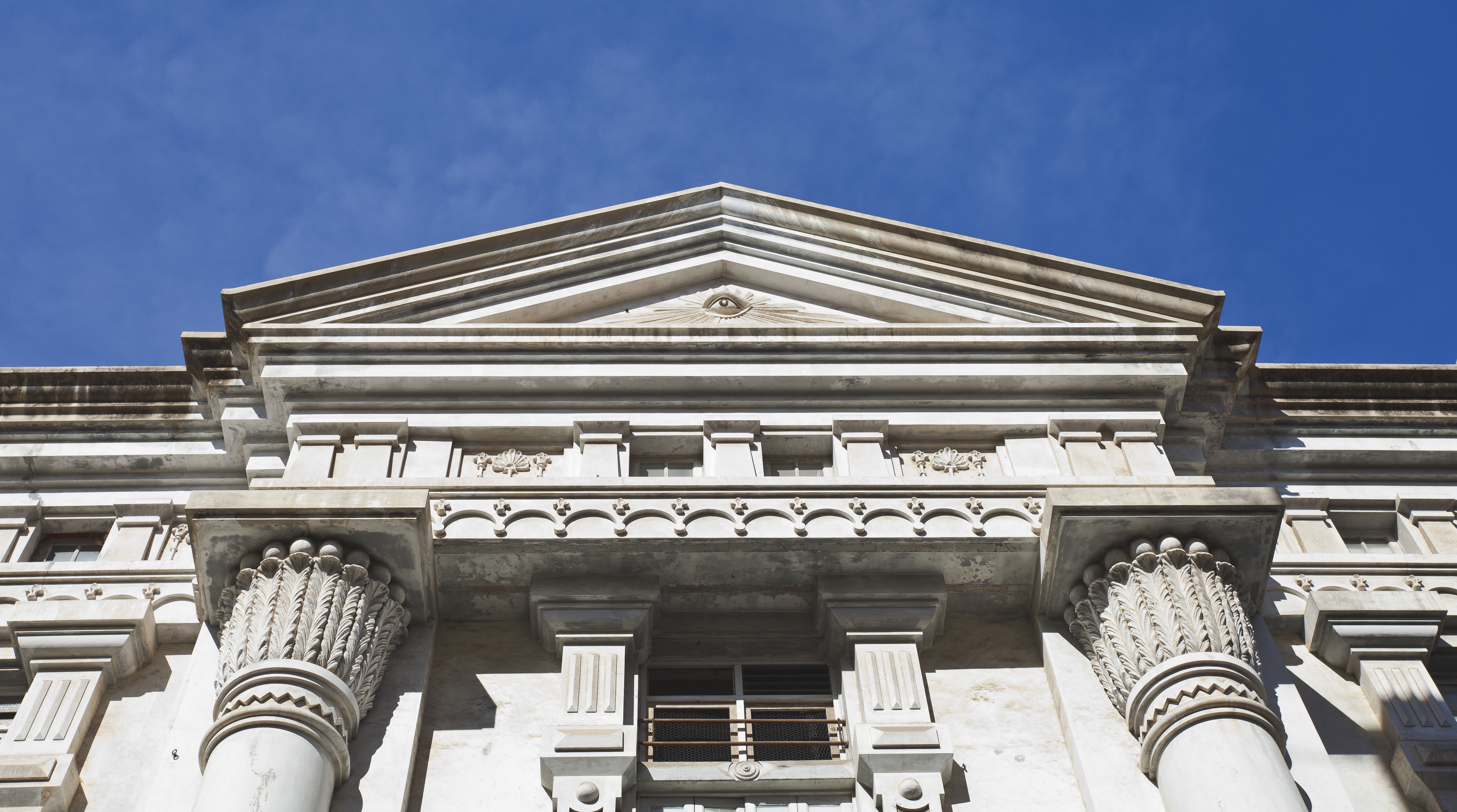
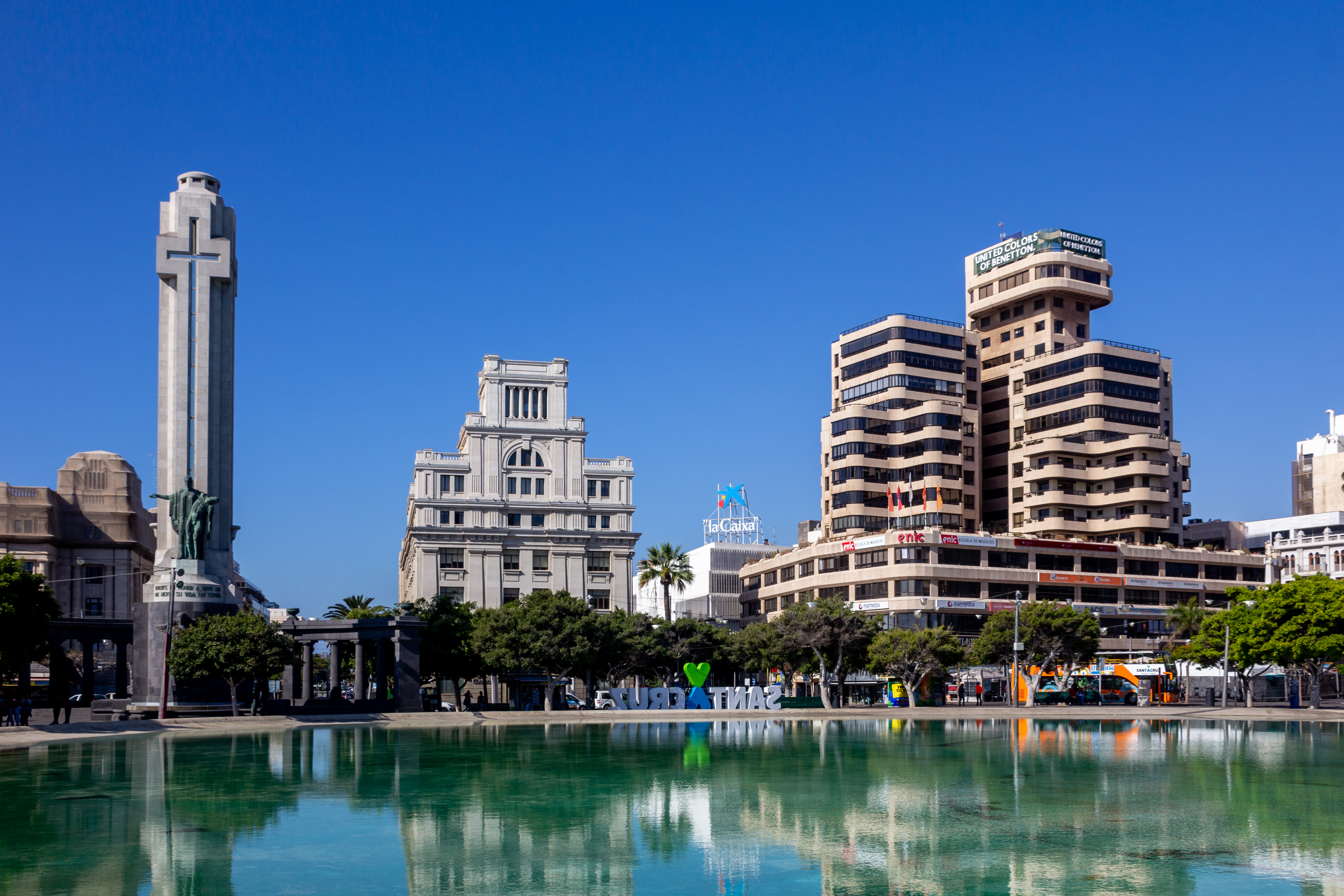
- Auditorium Playa de Las Teresitas Iglesia de la Concepción Parque García Sanabria Torres de Santa Cruz Masonic Temple Plaza de España

- Flag Coat of arms
- Nicknames: "La Capital Chicharrera", "La Capital Tinerfeña", "La Capital Santacrucera", "The Sydney of the Atlantic".
- Location of Santa Cruz de Tenerife
- Location within Tenerife Location within Canary Islands Location within Spain, Canary Islands
- Coordinates: 28°28′N 16°15′W
- Country: Spain
- Autonomous community: Canary Islands
- Province: Santa Cruz de Tenerife
- Island: Tenerife
- Founded: 3 May 1494, founded as "Real de la Santa Cruz"
- Ayuntamiento: Ayuntamiento de Santa Cruz de Tenerife

Government
  - Alcalde: José Manuel Bermúdez Esparza (CC)

Area
  - Municipality: 150.56 km^{2} (58.13 sq mi)
- Elevation: 1 m (3.3 ft)
- Highest elevation: 1,020 m (3,350 ft)
- Lowest elevation: 0 m (0 ft)

Population (2025-01-01)
  - Municipality: 211,957
  - Density: 1,407.8/km^{2} (3,646.2/sq mi)
  - Urban: 538,000
- Demonym(s): Santacrucero, ra Chicharrero, ra

GDP
  - Metro: €20.713 billion (2019)
- Time zone: WET
  - Summer (DST): WEST
- Postal code: 38001-38010, 38107, 38108, 38110, 38160, 38320
- Dialing code: +34 922, +34 822
- Language: Spanish
- Website: www.santacruzdetenerife.es

Santa Cruz de Tenerife (Spanish pronunciation: [ˈsanta ˈkɾuθ ðe teneˈɾife]; locally [ˈsanta ˈkɾus ðe teneˈɾife]), commonly abbreviated as Santa Cruz, is a city, the capital of the island of Tenerife, Province of Santa Cruz de Tenerife, and one of the capitals of the Canary Islands, along with Las Palmas. Santa Cruz has a population of 211,436 (2024) within its administrative limits. The urban zone of Santa Cruz extends beyond the city limits with a population of 507,306 and 538,000 within the urban area. It is the second largest city in the Canary Islands and the main city on the island of Tenerife, with nearly half of the island's population living in or around it.

Santa Cruz is located in the northeast quadrant of Tenerife, 210 kilometres (130 mi) off the north-western coast of Africa within the Atlantic Ocean. The distance to the nearest point of mainland Spain is 1,300 kilometres (810 mi). After the 1833 territorial division of Spain, Santa Cruz de Tenerife was the sole capital of the Canary Islands, until 1927, when the archipelago was split into the current two provinces. The port is of great importance and is the communications hub between Europe, Africa and the Americas, with cruise ships arriving from many nations. The city is the focus for domestic and inter-island communications in the Canary Islands.

The city is home to the Parliament of the Canary Islands, the Audience of Accounts of the Canary Islands, the Captaincy General of the Canary Islands, the Canarias Ministry of the Presidency (shared on a four-year cycle with Las Palmas), one half of the Ministries and Boards of the Canarias Government (the other half being located in Gran Canaria), the Tenerife Provincial Courts and two courts of the Superior Court of Justice of the Canary Islands. There are several faculties of the La Laguna University in Santa Cruz, including the Fine Arts School and the Naval Sciences Faculty. Its harbour is one of Spain's busiest. It is important for commercial and passenger traffic as well as for being a major stopover for cruisers en route from Europe to the Caribbean. The city also has one of the world's largest carnivals. The Carnival of Santa Cruz de Tenerife now aspires to become a World Heritage Site, and is the second largest in the world.

The varied architecture of the city stands out, highlighting the Auditorio de Tenerife (Auditorium of Tenerife), which is considered one of the greatest exponents of contemporary architecture and the Masonic Temple, in neo-Egyptian style, a unique building in the country. In the panoramic view of the city, the Torres de Santa Cruz (Santa Cruz Towers) also stand out, with the tallest twin towers in Spain at 120 meters (390 ft) high. Other outstanding places are the Plaza de España (Spain Square), which is the nerve center of the city, and the Parque García Sanabria (García Sanabria Park), a large urban park located at the center of the city. Outside the city but in its municipal district, Playa de Las Teresitas (Las Teresitas) and a large part of the Macizo de Anaga (Anaga Massif) stand out, declared a Biosphere Reserve by UNESCO in 2015. Santa Cruz de Tenerife hosts the first headquarters of the Center UNESCO in the Canary Islands. In recent years the city of Santa Cruz de Tenerife has seen the construction of a significant number of modern structures and the city's skyline is the sixth highest in the country, behind Madrid, Benidorm, Barcelona, Valencia and Bilbao.

In 2012, the British newspaper The Guardian included Santa Cruz de Tenerife in the list of the five best places in the world to live, next to the Cihangir district, in Istanbul; the district of Sankt Pauli, in Hamburg, the north coast of Maui, in Hawaii and Portland, in Oregon. 82% of the municipal territory of Santa Cruz de Tenerife is considered a natural area; this is due in large part to the presence of the Anaga Rural Park. This makes Santa Cruz the municipality in Spain with the third highest percentage of natural territory, after Cuenca (87%) and Cáceres (83%).

== Etymology ==
The area where Santa Cruz currently lies belonged to Menceyato Guanche Anaga, which was the most easterly of the island. The city that is now Santa Cruz had a few names throughout its history: Añazo or Añaza (Guanche name), Puerto de Santiago Santa Cruz de Tenerife, Santa Cruz de Santiago de Tenerife, and Santa Cruz de Tenerife (current), which means: "holy cross of Tenerife," in memory of the foundation of the city, when a Christian cross was planted in the place that is now the center of town.

== History ==
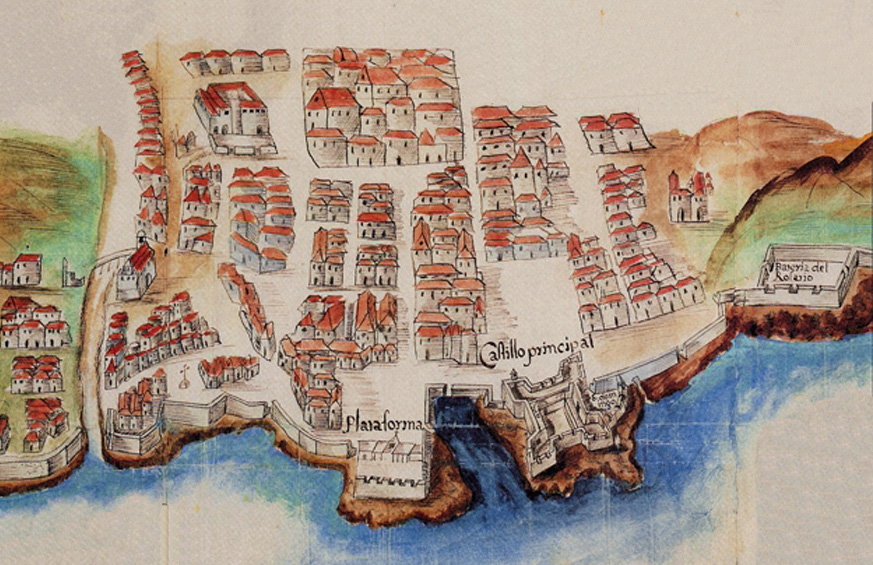
Map of Santa Cruz de Tenerife in 1701

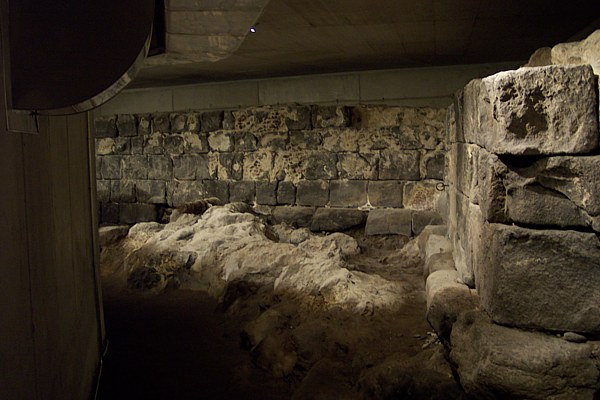
Ruins of the Castle of San Cristóbal, underground of the Plaza de España

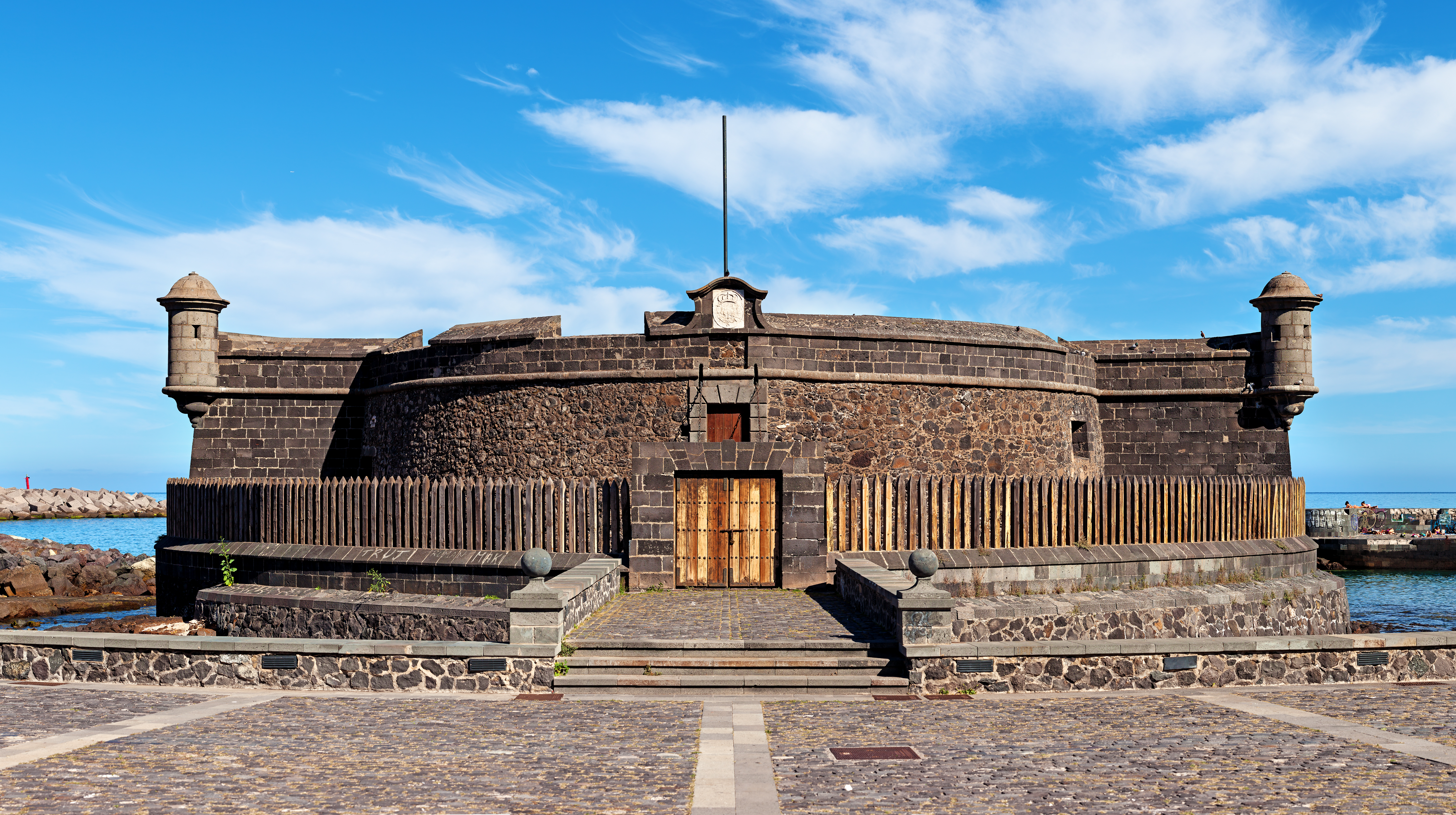
Castle of St John the Baptist, also known as Castillo Negro

=== Guanche period, conquest and Castilian colonization ===
The area on which now stands the city and the municipality of Santa Cruz de Tenerife has been the subject of human occupation since the time of the Guanches, approximately 2000 years ago, as attested by the archaeological sites found. The area was known to the Guanches, the first inhabitants of the island, as Añazo or Añaza. The famous Mummy of San Andrés is one of the most important archaeological remains of the aboriginal past of the region. Besides caves with some remains of mummified animals and stones with engravings ruprestres. This area belonged to the Menceyato de Anaga (aboriginal Guanche kingdom of Anaga), one of nine in which the island was divided.

On 3 May 1494 Castilian troops under the control of the conqueror Alonso Fernández de Lugo disembarked on the beaches of the present city and founded a military camp that would eventually develop into the city. From this place began the conquest of the island of Tenerife. During the foundation, Alonso Fernández de Lugo placed a large wooden cross in reference to the day of disembarkation, during the Catholic festivity of the Invention of the Cross (3 May). After the conquest and defeat of the Guanche aborigines, the capital of the island was initially established in the city of San Cristóbal de La Laguna, which was founded in the same year of the conquest of the island in 1496.

=== Old Regime and Modern Stage ===
Later, it became one of the most important ports of the Atlantic, a status it retains to this day. This former fishermen's village rose to prominence after a Volcano destroyed the port of Garachico in the 18th century.

Santa Cruz de Tenerife was, especially during the first half of the 18th century, the most important corsair center in the Macaronesian region. The recent discovery of abundant documentary evidence of significant corsair activity, carried out primarily by natives, residents, and those living on the island, confirms this fact. At the same time, the numerous pirate ships that frequented the Canary Islands waters used landing places along its coast. Such was the case of Valle de Salazar or San Andrés, which had acquired a reputation as a "pirate port" until the construction of its castle or defensive tower.

Due to the strategic location of Tenerife on the route between the Mediterranean and the Americas, it was attacked a number of times by the English and the Dutch. In particular, Santa Cruz Bay was the scene of two notable naval engagements involving two of the most famous British admirals. In 1656, an English squadron under Admiral Robert Blake defeated a Spanish silver fleet of 16 ships for the loss of none of his own, despite being under fire from shore batteries and attacking and withdrawing on the tide.

50 years later, a British squadron under John Jennings mounted an unsuccessful attack the island on 6 November 1706 during the War of the Spanish Succession. In 1797 Rear-Admiral Horatio Nelson launched an unsuccessful attempt to storm the harbour. It was at this battle that Nelson lost his right arm having been hit before he had stepped off the ship's boat. It was on Santiago's day and that is the reason for having Santiago's sword cutting the lion's head as a symbol of the Spanish victory. Santa Cruz eventually became the major port on the Island. It first won its independence from La Laguna and, in the 19th century, was awarded the status of Capital of the Province of Canary Islands by King Ferdinand VII.

Between 1833 and 1927 Santa Cruz de Tenerife was the sole capital of the Canary Islands. In 1927 a Royal decree ordered that the status of capital city of the Canary Islands would be shared with Las Palmas in Gran Canaria. This arrangement remains in place today.

In 1893 an outbreak of cholera-morbid spread throughout the city and neighboring municipalities. The disease was brought by an Italian ship returning from Brazil. There were 382 dead.

Between 1936 and 1939, during the Spanish Civil War, the Canary Islands were in the rear of General Francisco Franco's side. In this context, in 1936 the republican mayor of Santa Cruz de Tenerife, José Carlos Schwartz Hernández, was arrested and murdered. After the war, years of great economic difficulties followed.

From 1978, with the new Spanish Constitution and the Statute of Autonomy of the Canary Islands, a new stage began, always with democratically elected mayors.

In the 80s and 90s of the 20th century, the city experiences a great economic boom. The expansion of the city towards the south begins gaining ground to the Santa Cruz de Tenerife Refinery and creating new residential and urbanizable areas such as Cabo-Llanos. Since then, this area of the city is immersed in a major construction boom that has been nicknamed "Manhattanization", due to the presence of tall buildings and the layout of the streets that mimics that of American cities.

=== Current era: 21st century ===
Santa Cruz inaugurated the 21st century with a great expansionary and commercial boom that is especially manifested in architecture with the construction of emblematic buildings such as the Auditorio de Tenerife, the work of Santiago Calatrava or the remodeling of the Plaza de España according to the design of Swiss architects Herzog & de Meuron.

A torrential flood took place on 31 March 2002. This was caused by a phenomenon of cold drop characterized by the repeated fall of torrential rain accompanied by lightning, which affected the metropolitan area of Santa Cruz de Tenerife. The flooding caused 8 dead, 12 missing and dozens injured.

In recent years, it has become clear that there exists a de facto union with neighbouring city San Cristóbal de La Laguna (141,627 inhabitants as in 2005 census) due to the rapid population growth and reduction in undeveloped space between the cities, as their suburbs merged, forming a metropolitan area with 420,198 inhabitants (including the nearby municipalities of Tegueste, Candelaria and El Rosario). Regarding this situation, the mayor of Santa Cruz, Miguel Zerolo Aguilar and his La Laguna counterpart, Ana María Oramas Moro, both belonging to the Canarian Coalition, stated several times to local media that they shared a willingness to proceed to a full political union between their municipalities, even though the decision was postponed to a date after the local elections in 2007. As of 2012 the merger is no longer part of the political agenda.

The 2008 financial crisis paralyzed the development of the city for more than a decade.

In June 2018, the dismantling of the Santa Cruz de Tenerife Refinery was announced, which will allow the expansion of the city to the south.

== Climate ==
Santa Cruz has a climate intermediate between hot semi-arid climate (Köppen climate classification: BSh) and hot desert climate (Köppen: BWh), with less precipitation in the summer than in the winter. However, the municipal area includes also most of the Anaga Massif, which features 3 additional climate types: Semi-arid climate (BSk), Hot-summer Mediterranean climate (Csa), and Warm-summer Mediterranean climate (Csb). It has influences of a tropical climate, as the average temperature in the coldest month is above 18 °C (64 °F), although it cannot be classified as a tropical climate, because aridity levels prevail. The city's average annual temperature is 25 °C (77 °F) during the day and 18 °C (64 °F) at night. In the coolest month – January, the typical day temperature ranges from 19–23 °C (66–73 °F), to around 15–16 °C (59–61 °F) at night, the average sea temperature is 20 °C (68 °F). In the warmest month, August, the typical day temperature ranges from 26–32 °C (79–90 °F), to above 21 °C (70 °F) at night, whilst the average sea temperature is 23–24 °C (73–75 °F).

Sunshine hours average at 2,887 per year, from 168 in December and to 337 in July and August. Precipitation per year is only 226 millimetres (8.9 in), concentrated heavily between November and March: May to September are normally mostly dry. Precipitation patterns closely resemble those of the Mediterranean climates found in mainland Spain and up the hill in La Laguna, but generally with less precipitation during winter months.

Climate data for Santa Cruz de Tenerife WMO ID: 60020; Climate ID: C449C; coordinates 28°27′48″N 16°15′19″W; elevation: 36 m (118 ft); 1991–2020 provisional normals, extremes 1920–present
Month	Jan	Feb	Mar	Apr	May	Jun	Jul	Aug	Sep	Oct	Nov	Dec	Year
Record high °C (°F)	28.4 (83.1)	31.2 (88.2)	35.4 (95.7)	35.2 (95.4)	36.4 (97.5)	37.1 (98.8)	42.6 (108.7)	40.4 (104.7)	39.3 (102.7)	38.1 (100.6)	34.0 (93.2)	28.2 (82.8)	42.6 (108.7)
Mean maximum °C (°F)	24.4 (75.9)	24.9 (76.8)	26.5 (79.7)	27.3 (81.1)	29.1 (84.4)	31.3 (88.3)	34.4 (93.9)	34.0 (93.2)	31.9 (89.4)	30.4 (86.7)	28.1 (82.6)	25.2 (77.4)	35.7 (96.3)
Mean daily maximum °C (°F)	21.1 (70.0)	21.3 (70.3)	22.1 (71.8)	23.0 (73.4)	24.5 (76.1)	26.6 (79.9)	28.8 (83.8)	29.3 (84.7)	28.2 (82.8)	26.6 (79.9)	24.2 (75.6)	22.2 (72.0)	24.8 (76.6)
Daily mean °C (°F)	18.3 (64.9)	18.4 (65.1)	19.0 (66.2)	19.9 (67.8)	21.3 (70.3)	23.2 (73.8)	25.2 (77.4)	25.8 (78.4)	25.1 (77.2)	23.6 (74.5)	21.4 (70.5)	19.5 (67.1)	21.7 (71.1)
Mean daily minimum °C (°F)	15.5 (59.9)	15.4 (59.7)	15.9 (60.6)	16.8 (62.2)	18.1 (64.6)	19.9 (67.8)	21.5 (70.7)	22.3 (72.1)	21.9 (71.4)	20.6 (69.1)	18.5 (65.3)	16.8 (62.2)	18.6 (65.5)
Mean minimum °C (°F)	13.0 (55.4)	13.1 (55.6)	13.6 (56.5)	14.6 (58.3)	16.0 (60.8)	17.9 (64.2)	19.6 (67.3)	20.6 (69.1)	20.1 (68.2)	18.2 (64.8)	15.8 (60.4)	14.6 (58.3)	12.4 (54.3)
Record low °C (°F)	9.4 (48.9)	8.1 (46.6)	9.5 (49.1)	9.4 (48.9)	12.0 (53.6)	13.4 (56.1)	16.5 (61.7)	14.6 (58.3)	16.5 (61.7)	14.6 (58.3)	10.1 (50.2)	10.0 (50.0)	8.1 (46.6)
Average precipitation mm (inches)	28.8 (1.13)	33.7 (1.33)	37.8 (1.49)	10.3 (0.41)	3.5 (0.14)	0.6 (0.02)	0.1 (0.00)	3.5 (0.14)	4.5 (0.18)	24.4 (0.96)	35.8 (1.41)	36.8 (1.45)	219.7 (8.65)
Average precipitation days (≥ 0.1 mm)	7.80	6.63	6.93	5.13	2.53	0.77	0.20	0.80	2.23	6.00	8.83	8.53	56.40
Average relative humidity (%)	62.7	62.2	61.5	60.5	59.9	59.8	57.5	59.8	63.6	65.0	64.4	65.0	61.8
Mean monthly sunshine hours	187.8	191.5	235.1	253.3	289.2	312.0	346.3	329.9	267.8	227.9	179.9	177.8	2,998.5
Percentage possible sunshine	57.7	60.1	63.0	65.9	68.2	74.4	81.0	81.1	72.5	63.9	55.7	55.3	66.6
Source 1: Agencia Estatal de Meteorologia (AEMET OpenData) for temperatures and precipitation
Source 2: NOAA (Sunshine hours)

Climate data for Santa Cruz de Tenerife, 1981–2010 normals
Month	Jan	Feb	Mar	Apr	May	Jun	Jul	Aug	Sep	Oct	Nov	Dec	Year
Mean daily maximum °C (°F)	21.0 (69.8)	21.2 (70.2)	22.1 (71.8)	22.7 (72.9)	24.1 (75.4)	26.2 (79.2)	28.7 (83.7)	29.0 (84.2)	28.1 (82.6)	26.3 (79.3)	24.1 (75.4)	22.1 (71.8)	24.6 (76.3)
Daily mean °C (°F)	18.2 (64.8)	18.3 (64.9)	19.0 (66.2)	19.7 (67.5)	21.0 (69.8)	22.9 (73.2)	25.0 (77.0)	25.5 (77.9)	24.9 (76.8)	23.4 (74.1)	21.3 (70.3)	19.4 (66.9)	21.5 (70.7)
Mean daily minimum °C (°F)	15.4 (59.7)	15.3 (59.5)	15.9 (60.6)	16.5 (61.7)	17.8 (64.0)	19.5 (67.1)	21.2 (70.2)	21.9 (71.4)	21.7 (71.1)	20.3 (68.5)	18.4 (65.1)	16.6 (61.9)	18.4 (65.1)
Average precipitation mm (inches)	32 (1.3)	35 (1.4)	38 (1.5)	12 (0.5)	4 (0.2)	1 (0.0)	trace	2 (0.1)	7 (0.3)	19 (0.7)	34 (1.3)	43 (1.7)	226 (8.9)
Average precipitation days (≥ 1.0 mm)	4.2	3.8	3.8	2.4	0.9	0.2	trace	0.3	0.9	3.1	4.7	5.4	29.7
Average relative humidity (%)	64	63	62	61	61	61	58	61	65	65	64	67	63
Mean monthly sunshine hours	178	186	221	237	282	306	337	319	253	222	178	168	2,913
Source: Agencia Estatal de Meteorología

Climate data for Santa Cruz de Tenerife
Month	Jan	Feb	Mar	Apr	May	Jun	Jul	Aug	Sep	Oct	Nov	Dec	Year
Average sea temperature °C (°F)	20.1 (68.3)	19.4 (66.8)	19.3 (66.7)	19.5 (67.2)	20.1 (68.3)	21.1 (70.1)	22.0 (71.5)	22.8 (73.1)	23.7 (74.6)	23.6 (74.4)	22.3 (72.1)	20.8 (69.4)	21.2 (70.2)
Mean daily daylight hours	11.0	11.0	12.0	13.0	14.0	14.0	14.0	13.0	12.0	11.0	11.0	10.0	12.2
Average Ultraviolet index	4	6	8	9	10	11	11	11	9	7	5	4	7.9
Source: seatemperature.org (sea temperature)
Source: Weather Atlas

== Administrative divisions ==
Administrative divisions of Santa Cruz

Santa Cruz is divided administratively into five districts, which in turn are subdivided into districts, not necessarily consistent with the traditional neighborhoods.

No	District	Population
1	Anaga	14,135
2	Centro-Ifara	53,652
3	La Salud-La Salle	70,120
4	Ofra-Costa Sur	47,977
5	Distrito Suroeste	41,136

== Demographics ==
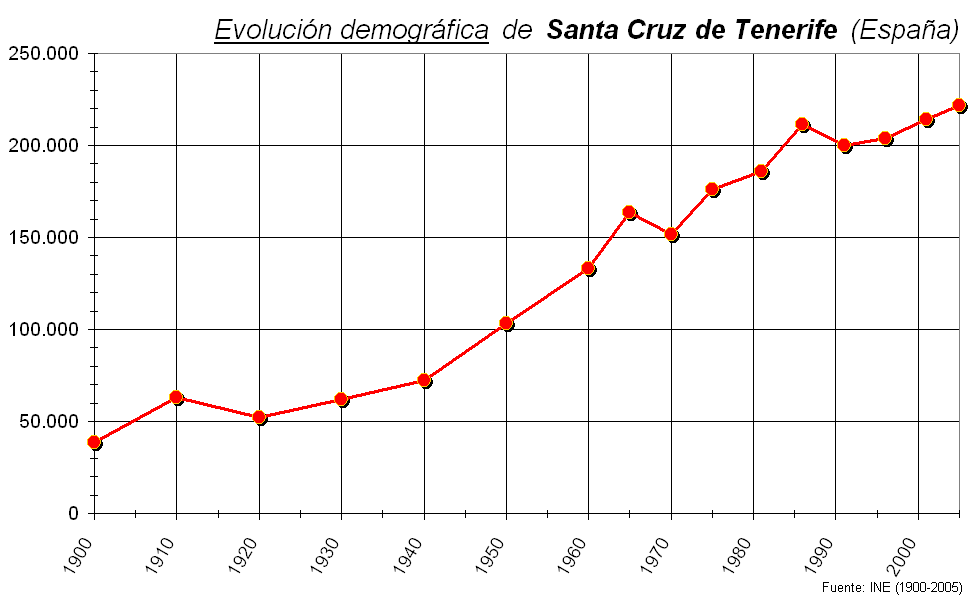
Population

In 1990, the population peaked above the 200,000 mark. Santa Cruz de Tenerife and the city of San Cristóbal de La Laguna form a continuous urban area, with a combined population of over 380,000 inhabitants.

Ethnically, the population is mainly of European origin, primarily from the Iberian Península, both Spain and Portugal, with some mix of the island's original inhabitants, the Guanches. There has been some Latin American immigration (especially from Cuba and Venezuela) as well as from both Northern and Sub-Sahara Africa. There are also important historical minorities such as Indians (Sindhi), Koreans (see Koreans in Spain) and, more recently, Russians. The majority of the population professes the Catholic religion, but there are also small communities of Hindus and Muslims. In Santa Cruz de Tenerife, crime has decreased in recent years and the city has gained a reputation for tolerance among its inhabitants. In fact, Santa Cruz de Tenerife was the first city of the Canary Islands to display the rainbow flag alongside the flag of the City Council, in June 2008.

In the 2020s, the Canary Islands have seen an influx of illegal migrants, from countries like Mali, Senegal, Morocco, and Pakistan. Most of them arrive in El Hierro, and many go on to be transferred to camps on the island of Tenerife.

In comparison with the nearby city of San Cristóbal de La Laguna, which is the seat of Bishopric of Tenerife, traditionally the city of Santa Cruz de Tenerife has had a much more secular character. This fact brought about in the city institutions of deep secular tradition such as the Masonic Temple of Santa Cruz de Tenerife that was one of the largest masonic centers in Spain.

According to a study by the National Statistics Institute of Spain (INE), among the two Canarian capitals, Santa Cruz de Tenerife is the one with the highest life expectancy at 81 years. Just behind Santa Cruz is Las Palmas de Gran Canaria, with 80.9 years.

One of the main problems currently facing the city and municipality is the increase in homelessness, which is becoming a chronic and controversial issue in Tenerife. According to Caritas data from May 2026, there are more than 2,800 people experiencing homelessness on the island. The majority are concentrated in Santa Cruz de Tenerife, which alone accounts for more than a third of the total, with approximately 998 people. Santa Cruz is also the municipality in the Canary Islands with the highest number of homeless people. Together with San Cristóbal de La Laguna, they represent 47.5% of the island's total homeless population. Behind these situations of extreme housing exclusion lie multiple factors, such as the breakdown of family networks, unemployment, difficulties accessing housing, addictions, and mental health problems.

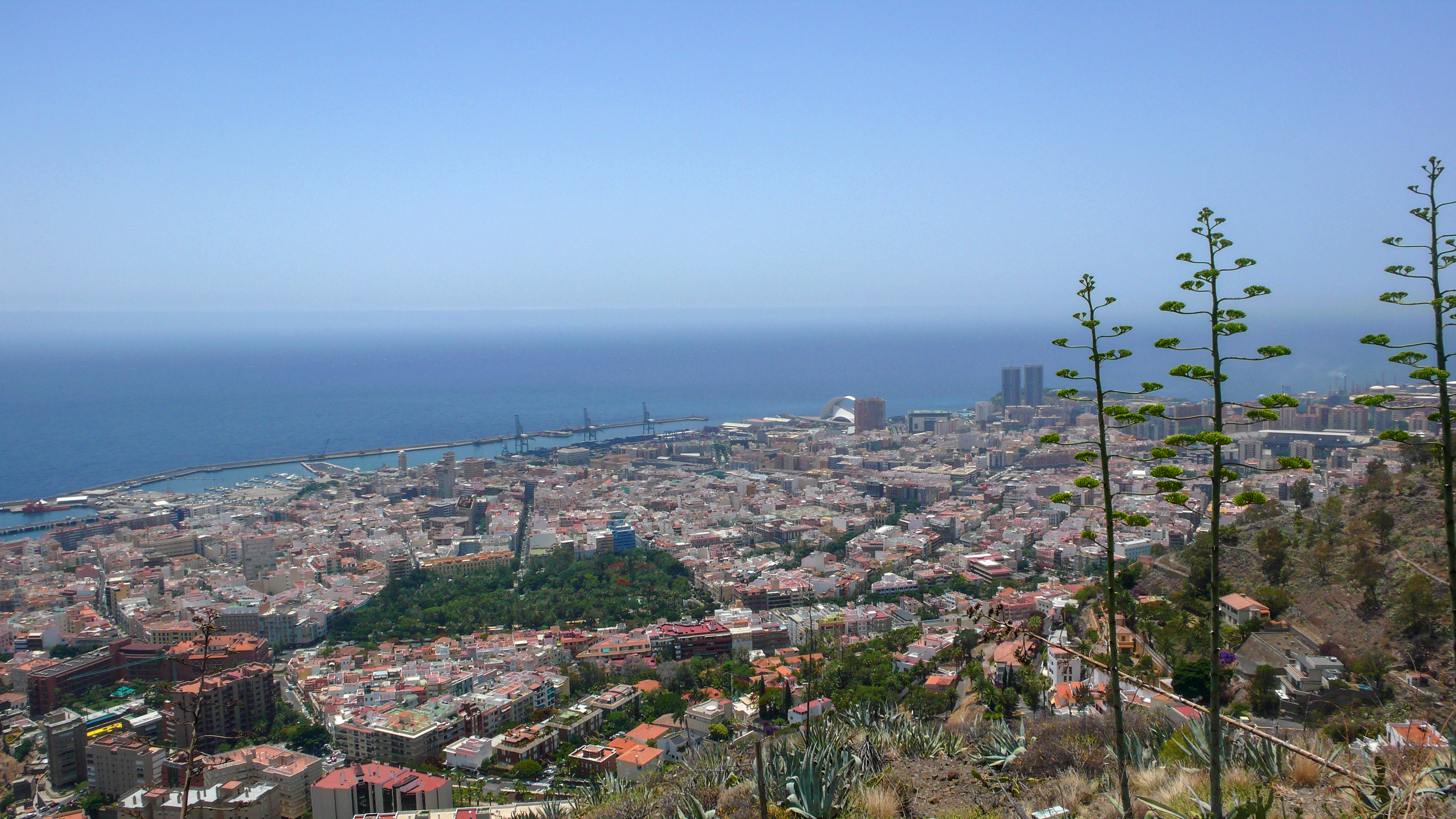
Panoramic view of the city

The city as seen from San Andres' Industrial Estate, and in the background the Auditorio and the skyscrapers

Year	Population
1991	200,172
1996	203,787
2001	188,477
2002	217,414
2003	220,022
2004	219,466
2006	221,956
2007	220,902
2008	226,232
2013	206,593

Largest groups of foreign-born people in 2018:

Venezuela	9,608
Cuba	3,940
Argentina	1,659
Bolivia	1,569
Colombia	1,558
Italy	1,097
Morocco	702
Ecuador	655
Uruguay	627
China	558

== Metropolitan area ==
Map of Tenerife, in yellow note of Metropolitan Area

The Santa Cruz de Tenerife-La Laguna Metropolitan Area forms the second largest city and metropolitan area of the European Union outside Europe. According to data provided by the Canary Islands Government and Cabildo de Tenerife the metropolitan area of Santa Cruz de Tenerife is composed of the municipalities of Santa Cruz de Tenerife, San Cristobal de La Laguna, El Rosario and Tegueste with a population of 404,913 inhabitants in 2008 in the city's 322.13 km^{2} (124.38 sq mi) area, giving a population density of 1,156.33/km^{2} (2,994.9/sq mi).

According to AUDES5 this conurbation also comprises the municipalities of Tacoronte and El Sauzal, bringing the total population of the urban population would reach 581.947 (2008).

The cities of Santa Cruz and San Cristobal de La Laguna and urban are physically linked, so that together have a population of over 382,331 inhabitants, making them the largest urban area in the Canaries (independent of municipal lines).

== Economy ==
Santa Cruz de Tenerife has the highest concentration of shops in the Canary Islands. The economy of Santa Cruz relies mainly on services. Trade, tourism, import-export, the seaport and the presence of the major political and financial institutions, as well as the most important companies, guarantee a strong economic activity and development. The building sector is important, while industry, apart from the oil refinery and food processing, is relatively minor. Santa Cruz has regenerated many areas of the city and modernised its infrastructure, built brand new areas, malls, high buildings and some charismatic structures, such as Calatrava's Auditorio or the Congress Hall, César Manrique's Marina and the not-yet-completed Óscar Domínguez Museum of Modern Art and Culture (IODACC) and the new Plaza de España layout, both by Basel-based Pritzker Prize winner studio Herzog & de Meuron. Work to renew the man-made Las Teresitas Beach is ongoing under the direction of French architect Dominique Perrault.

== Symbols of Santa Cruz de Tenerife ==
=== Seal ===
The seal of Santa Cruz de Tenerife has the characteristic features of the Loyal, Noble, Invicta and very beneficial Town, Port and Plaza de Santa Cruz de Santiago de Tenerife. Curiously, it is not square or shield-shaped, but oval. In a blue background with anchors and castles have a green cross, the symbol of the Foundation Cross, which gave the city its name. Behind the cross is a sword of Santiago in red, reminiscent of the day in which the city of Santiago defeated Horatio Nelson. Under this sword are three lion heads facing right (the shield), which symbolizes the victories over the attacks by Blake, Jennings and Nelson (the Spanish considered the 1657 attack a victory). It has castles, anchors and an island of silver. Also holds the Medal of Charity and the Crown. The crown of laurel and olive trees surrounding the shield is the symbol of victory for the city to each and every one of the attacks.

=== Flag ===
The flag of Santa Cruz de Tenerife is all white with the municipal shield in the center. Granted by Royal Warrant of King Charles IV of 28 August 1803. On a white cloth, coat of arms of the city. The white, the characteristic of the Bourbon dynasty, refers to fidelity to the city of Santa Cruz de Tenerife in the Royal House of Spain.

== Port of Santa Cruz de Tenerife ==
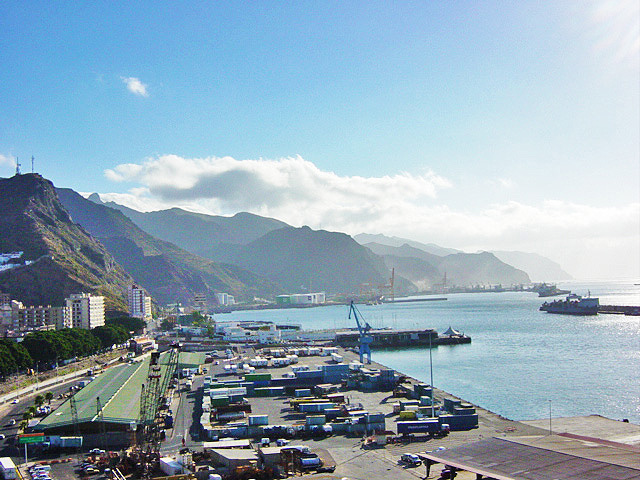
Panoramic view of the port of Santa Cruz de Tenerife

The Port of Santa Cruz de Tenerife is a fishing port, commercial, passenger and sports from the city of Santa Cruz de Tenerife, capital of the island, located in the Atlantic Ocean. It is managed by the Port Authority of Santa Cruz de Tenerife.

It is the first fishing port in the Canary Islands with approximately 7,500 tons of fish caught, according to the Statistical Yearbook of the State Ports 2006 (the latest of which is changing). Following this report is the largest port number of passengers recorded.

== Culture ==
=== Cultural areas ===
- Auditorio de Tenerife: the work of Spanish architect Santiago Calatrava. Is an emblematic building of Spanish architecture. The Tenerife Auditorium stands northeast of the Marine Park. Their great sailing boat simulating has become a symbol of the city, island and archipelago. The auditorium has two rooms and a chamber symphony. It is the seat of Orquesta Sinfónica de Tenerife and it holds, among other acts, the Festival de Ópera de Tenerife, the Classical Music Festival of the Canary Islands, the Tenerife International Film Music Festival and the delivery of awards Cadena Dial.
- Guimerá Theater: Opened on 25 July 1851. Great 19th century building located in the central street of Àngel Guimerà, is the oldest theatre in the Canary Islands.
- Museum of Fine Arts: This museum has, in addition to a fund with a deposit of works from the Prado Museum. Outstanding paintings by artists such as Peter Coeck, Ribera, Madrazo and Sorolla. As a fixed background, artists such as canaries Gaspar de Quevedo, Cristóbal Hernández de Quintana, and Juan Miranda González Méndez, among others.
- Museum of Nature and Man: history, through pictures and objects, the Guanches. There is a room where is the formation of the Canary Islands. Among the archaeological finds shown are several Guanche mummies, including two mummified fetuses. There are a lot of Guanche skulls and reproductions of works of Africa and the pre-Columbian America among many other samples. It is a museum of international reputation since it has participated in international meetings on archeology.
- Circulo de Bellas Artes: Founded in 1926 and based in Castle Street 43, is a cultural center that program of events, such as art exhibitions of painting and photography in the courtroom on the ground floor, directly accessible from the street. It has a cafeteria on the first floor.
- Espacio Cultural El Tanque: In 1997 a former container tank at the refinery, there becomes exhibitions, dance and audio, alternative music, theatre, classical music, new technologies and multimedia, among other productions.
- Centro de Fotografía Isla de Tenerife: It has areas suitable for exhibition and study of traditional and contemporary photography.
- The Art Room Recova: The Recova the Art Room is located in the old market town. Do not have a permanent collection, but are rotating exhibitions throughout the year.
- TEA – Tenerife Espacio de las Artes: work of Herzog & de Meuron opened in 2008.
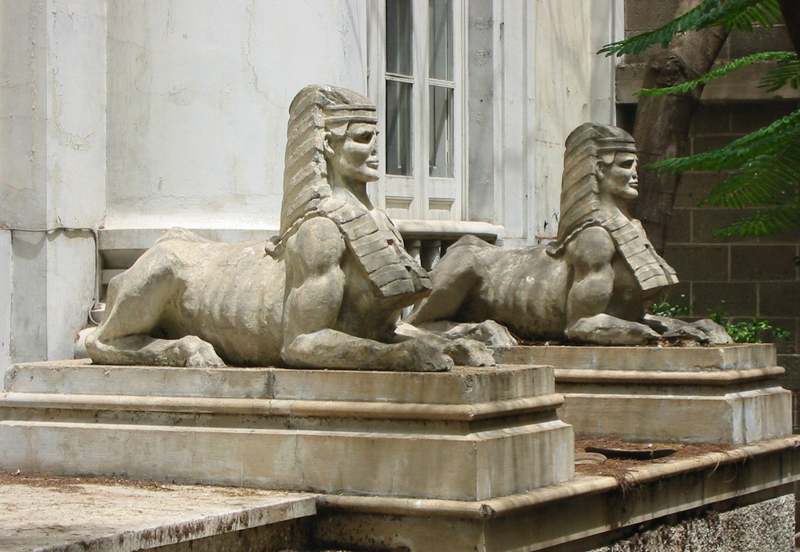
Statues in the entrance of the Masonic Temple of Santa Cruz de Tenerife

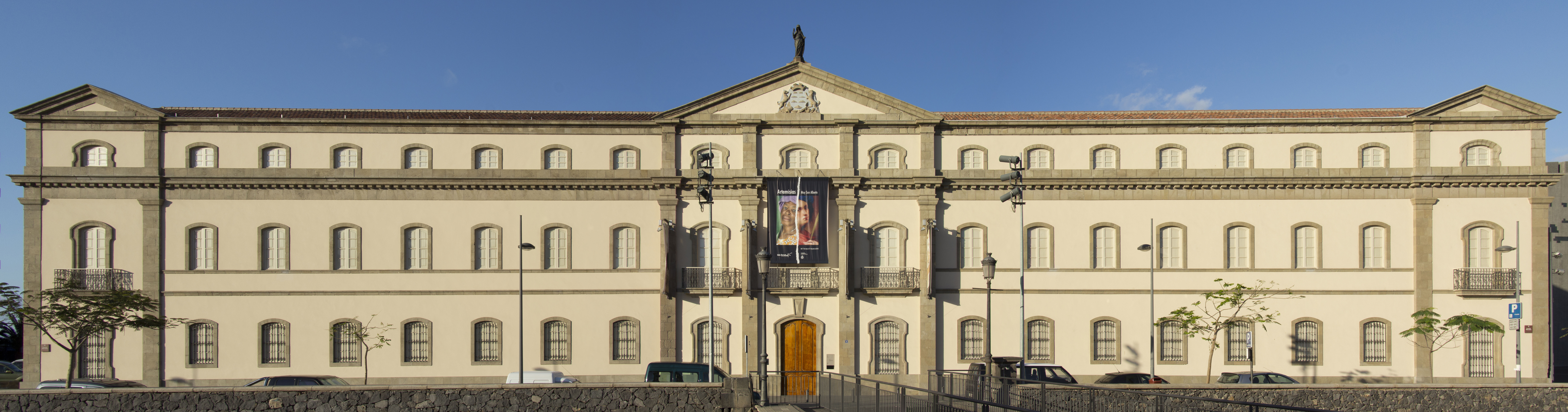
Museo de la Naturaleza y el Hombre

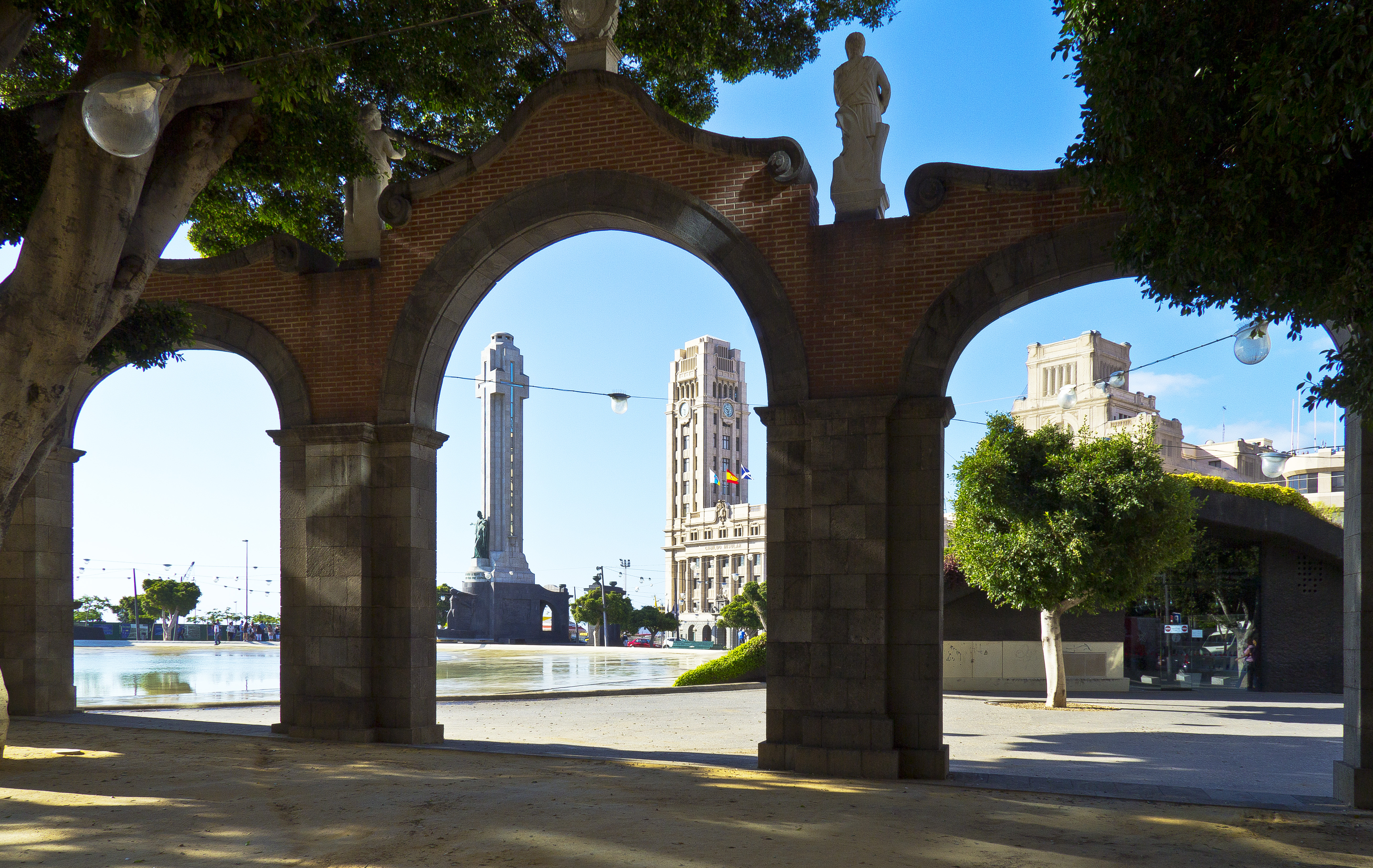
Plaza de España

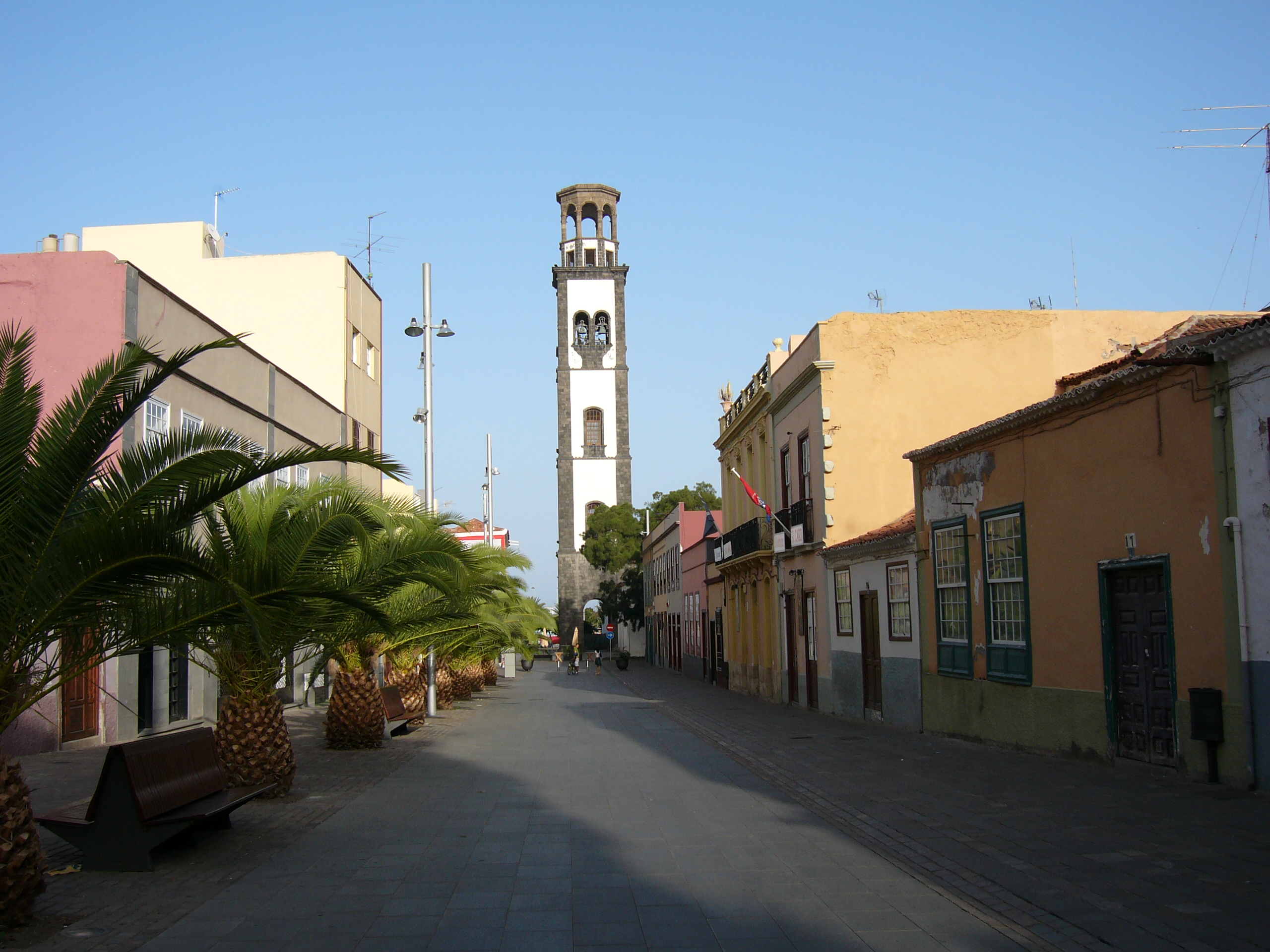
Iglesia de la Concepción (Church of Concepción)

=== Urban sculptures ===
The city contains many pieces of sculpture, as well as the Exhibition of Outdoor Sculpture in Santa Cruz de Tenerife. Situated along the Ramblas and the Parque Garcia Sanabria, the exhibition contains works by artists such as Henry Moore, Andreu Alfaro, Martin Chirino, Joan Miró and Óscar Domínguez, among others.

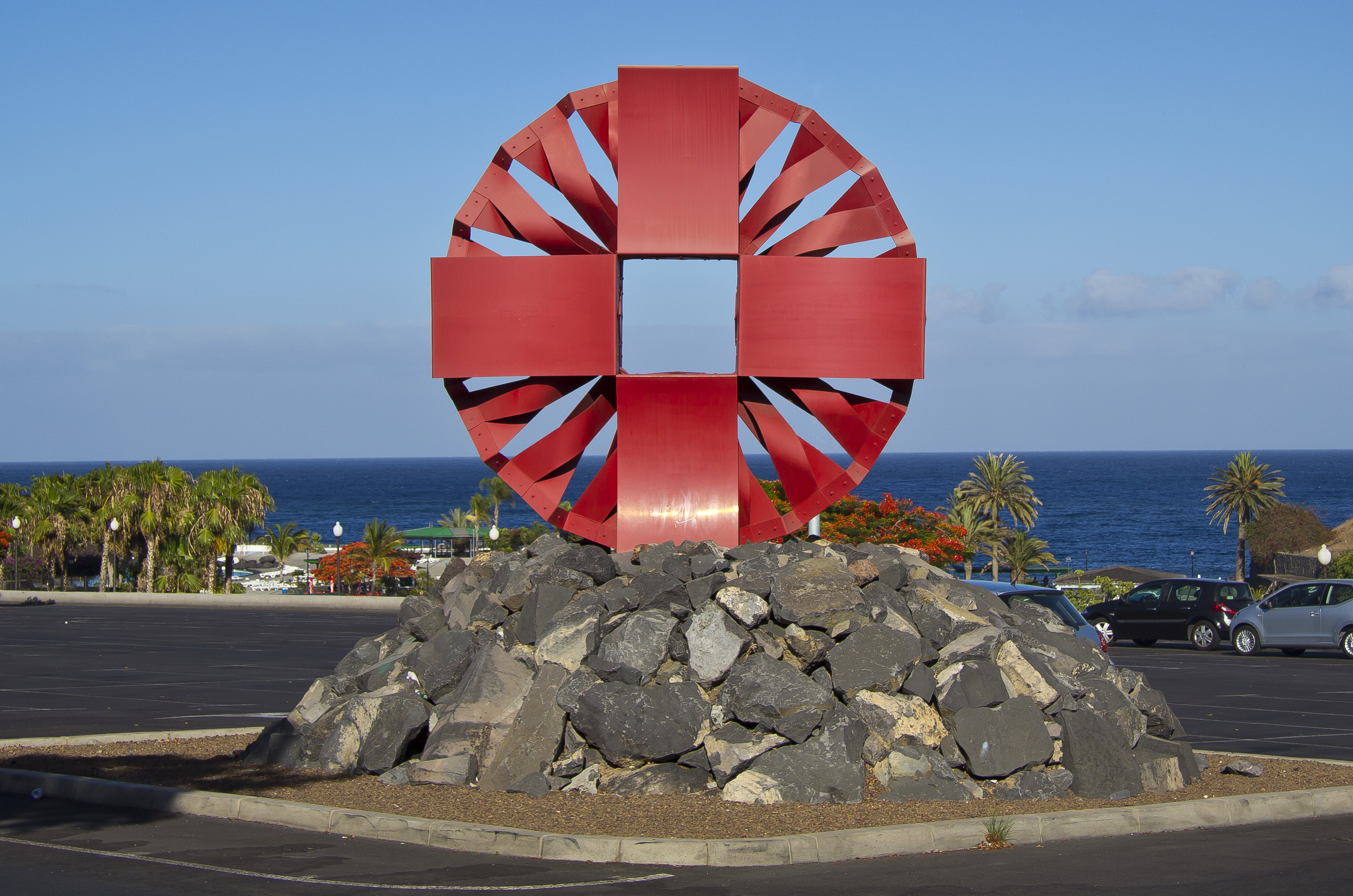
Sol Rojo by Edgar Neget

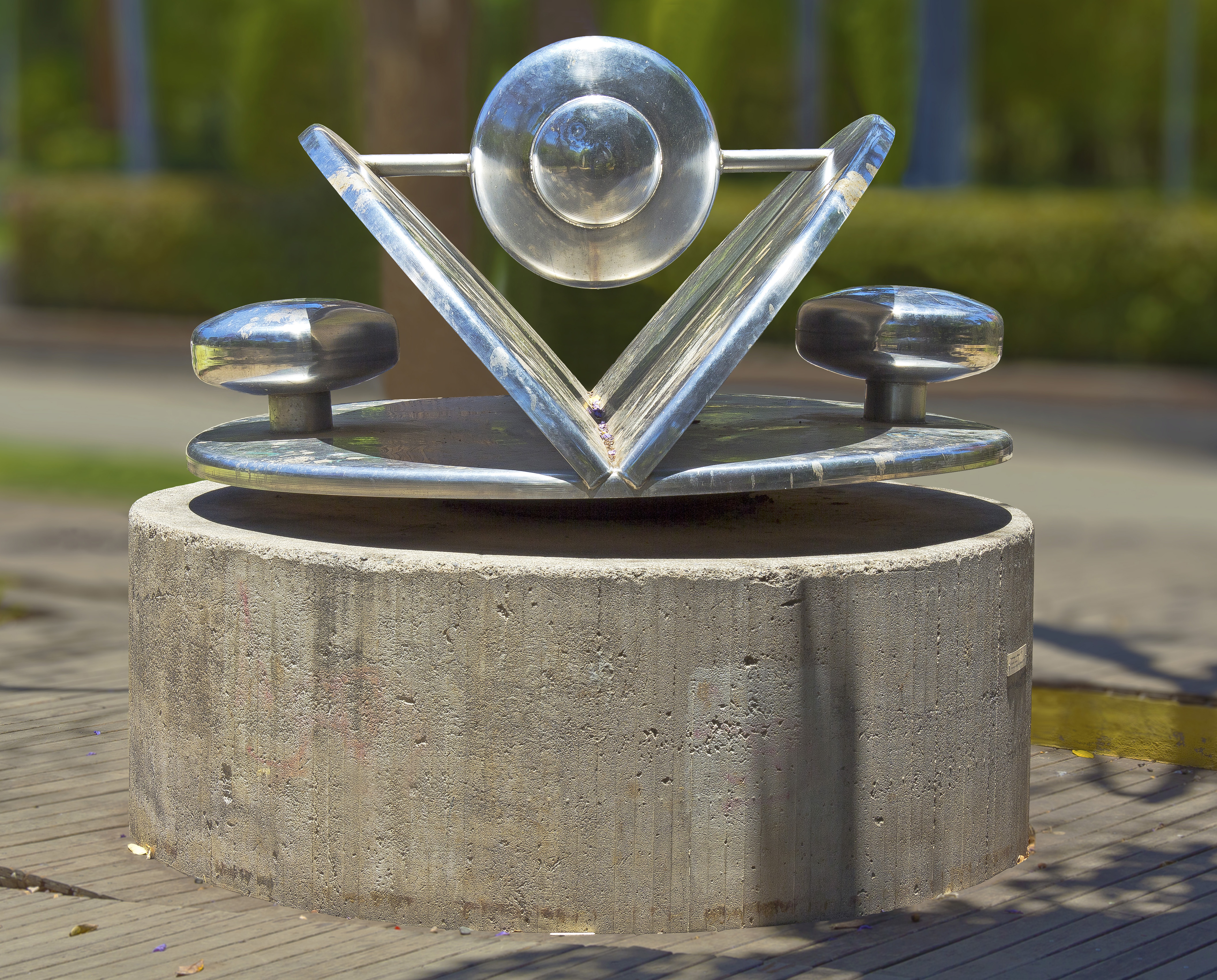
Homenaje a Millares by Claude Viseux

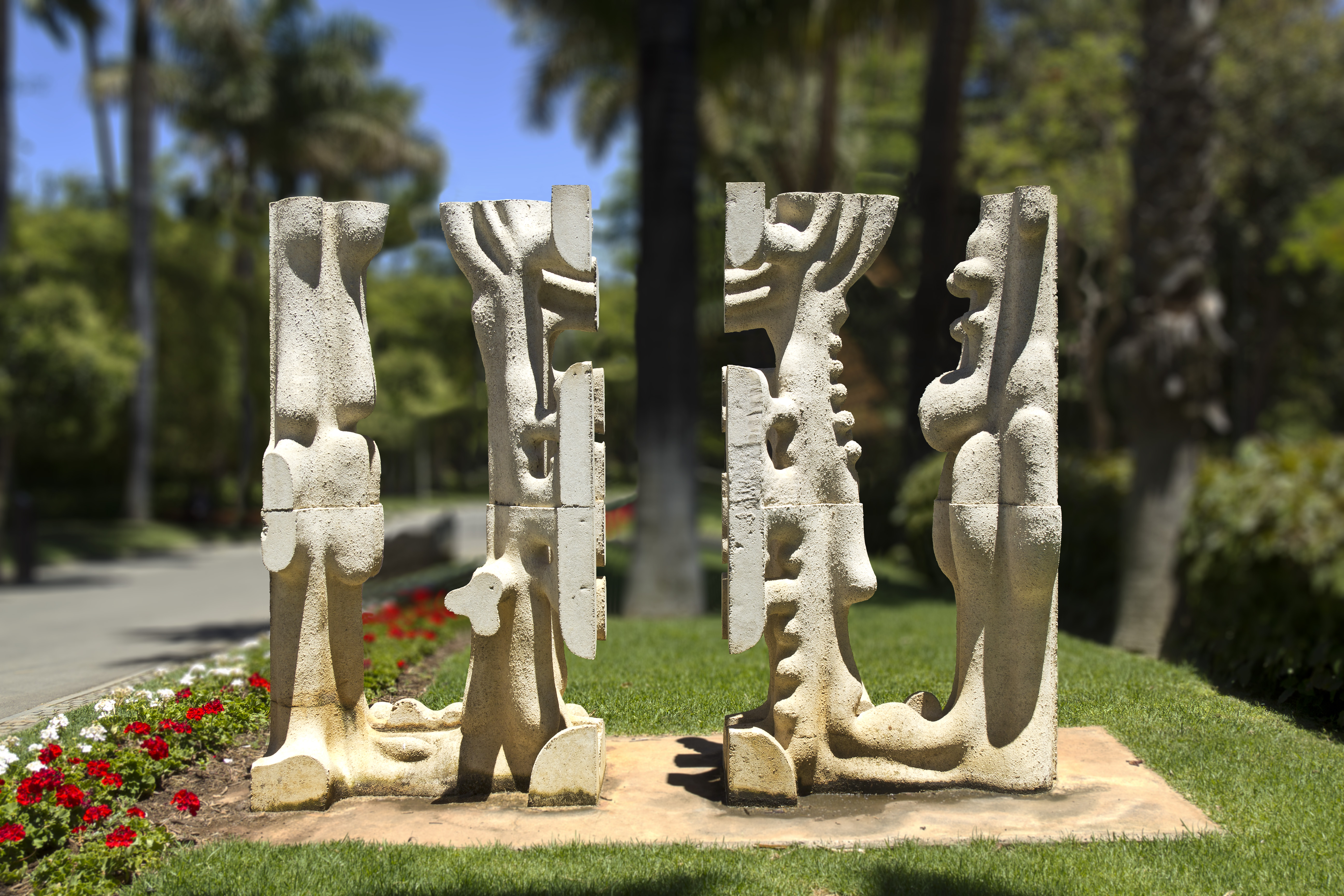
Sin titulo by Federico Assler

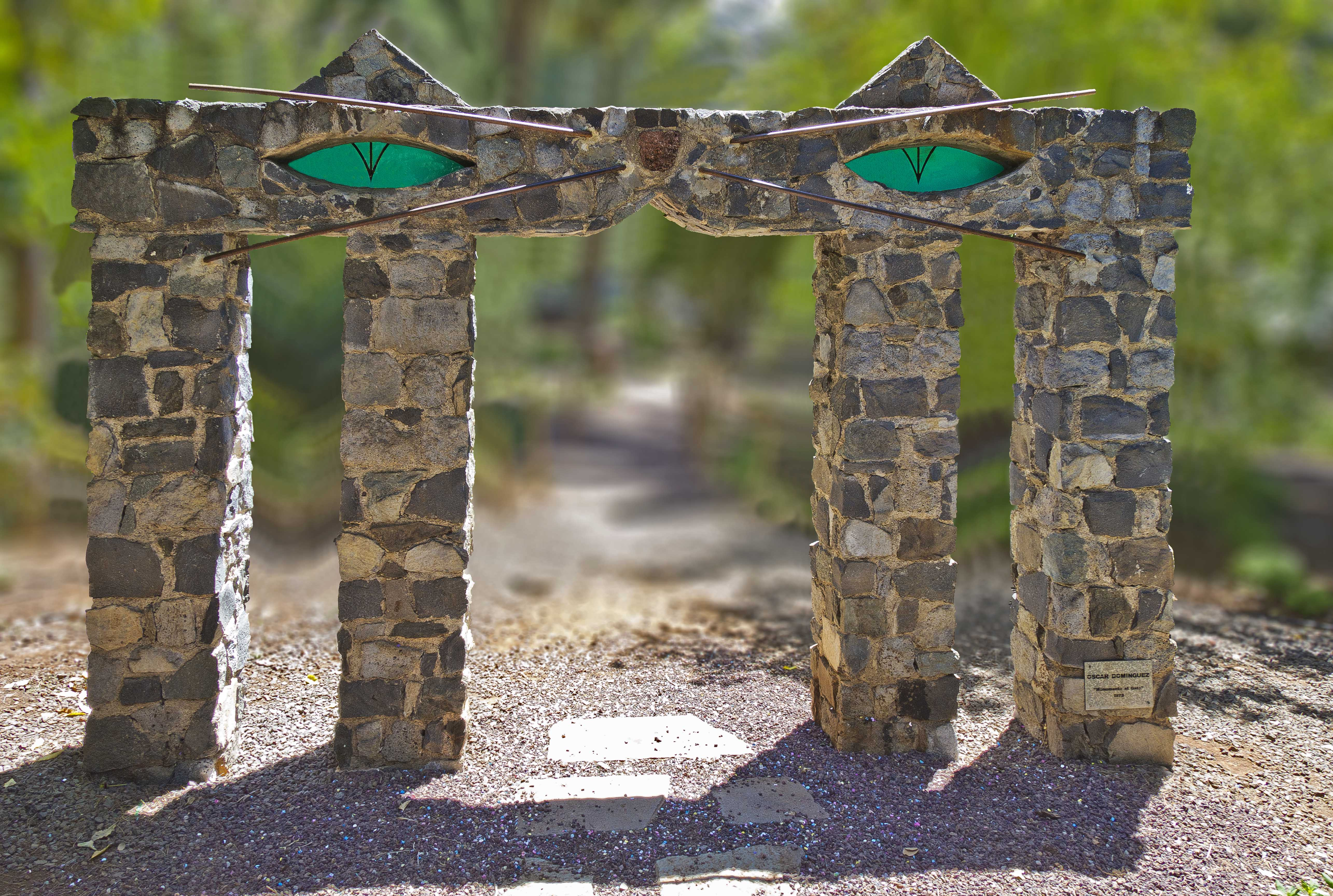
Monumento al Gato by Óscar Domíngez

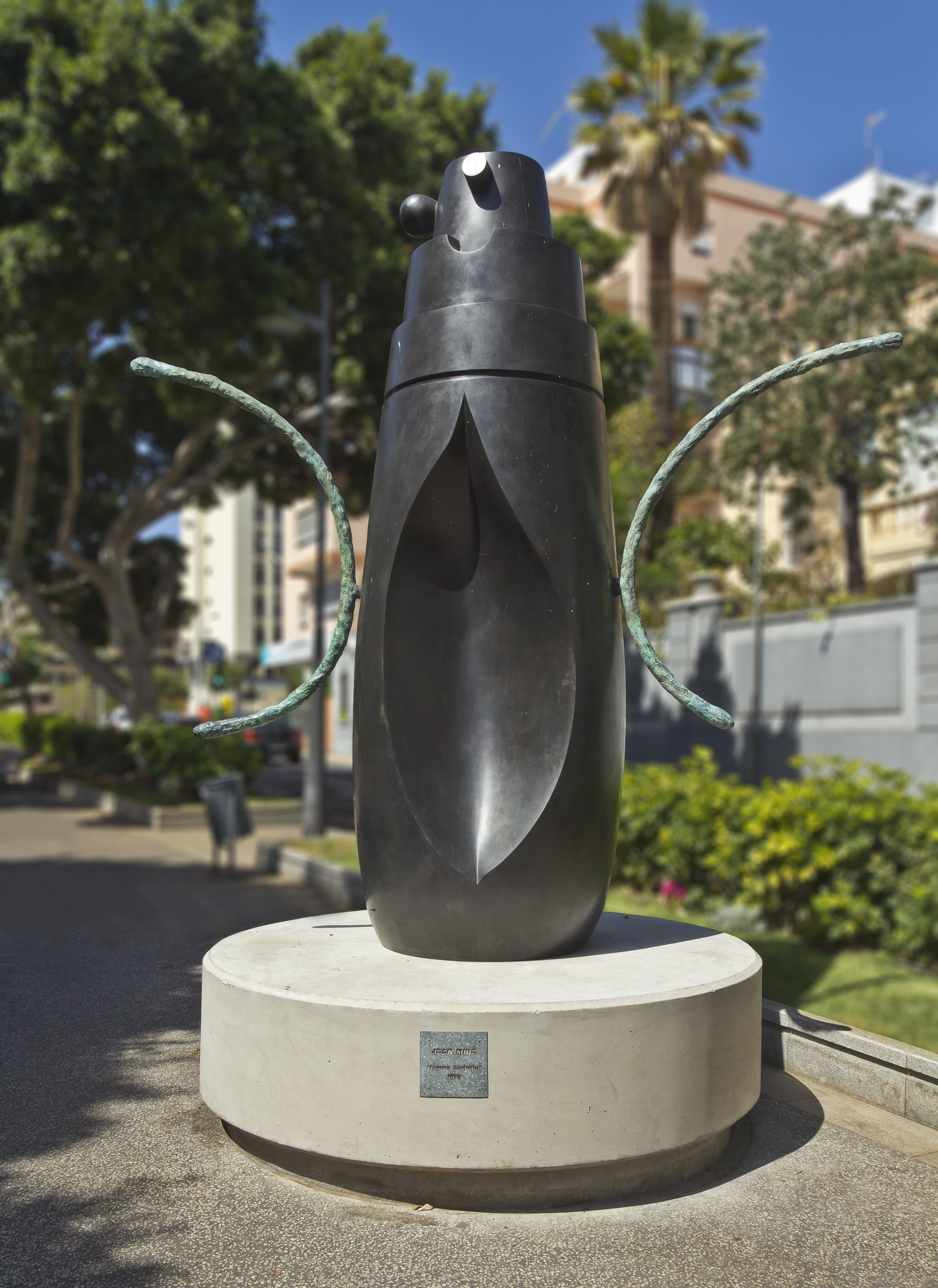
Femme Bouteille by Joan Miró

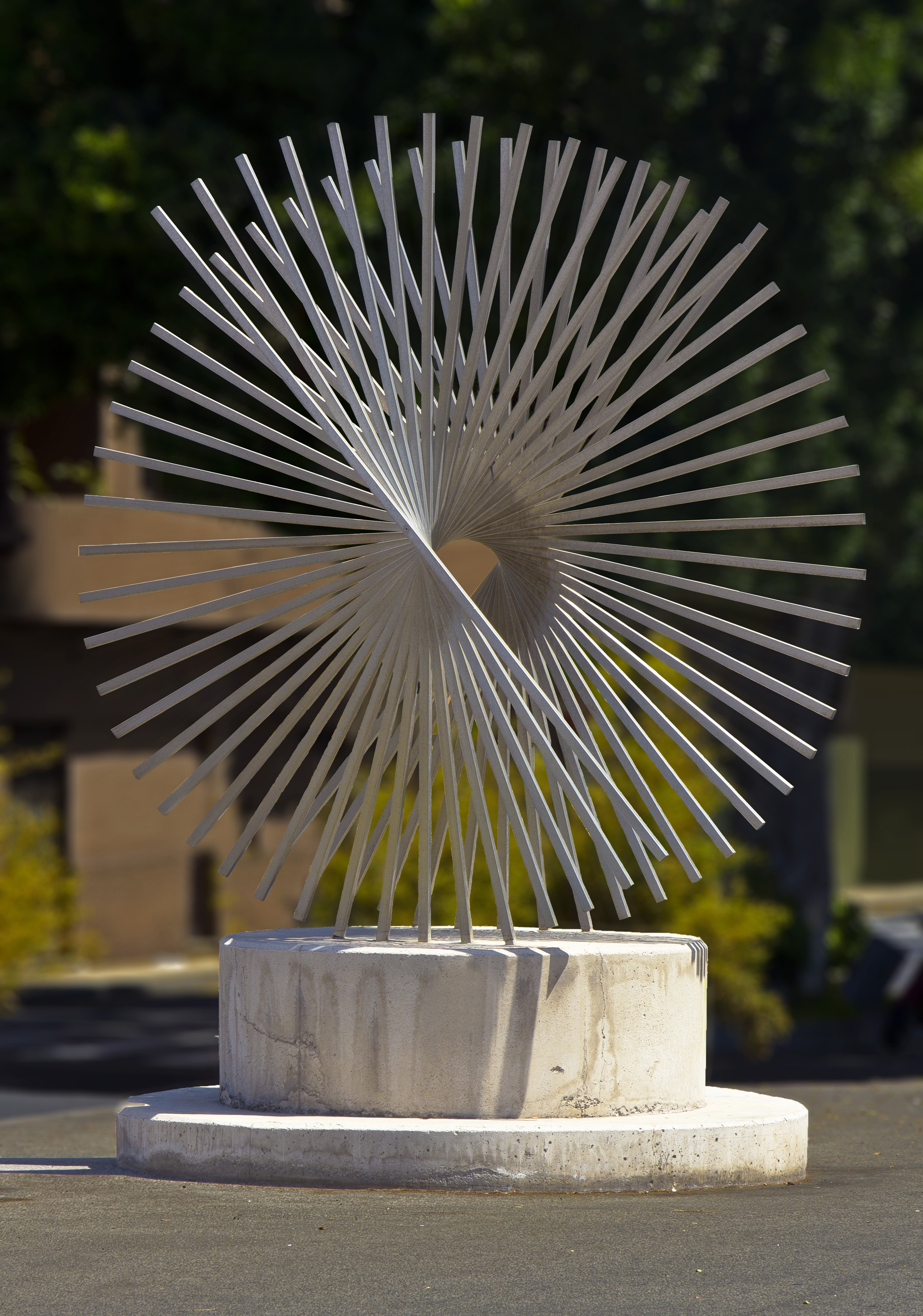
Sin titulo by Andreu Alfaro

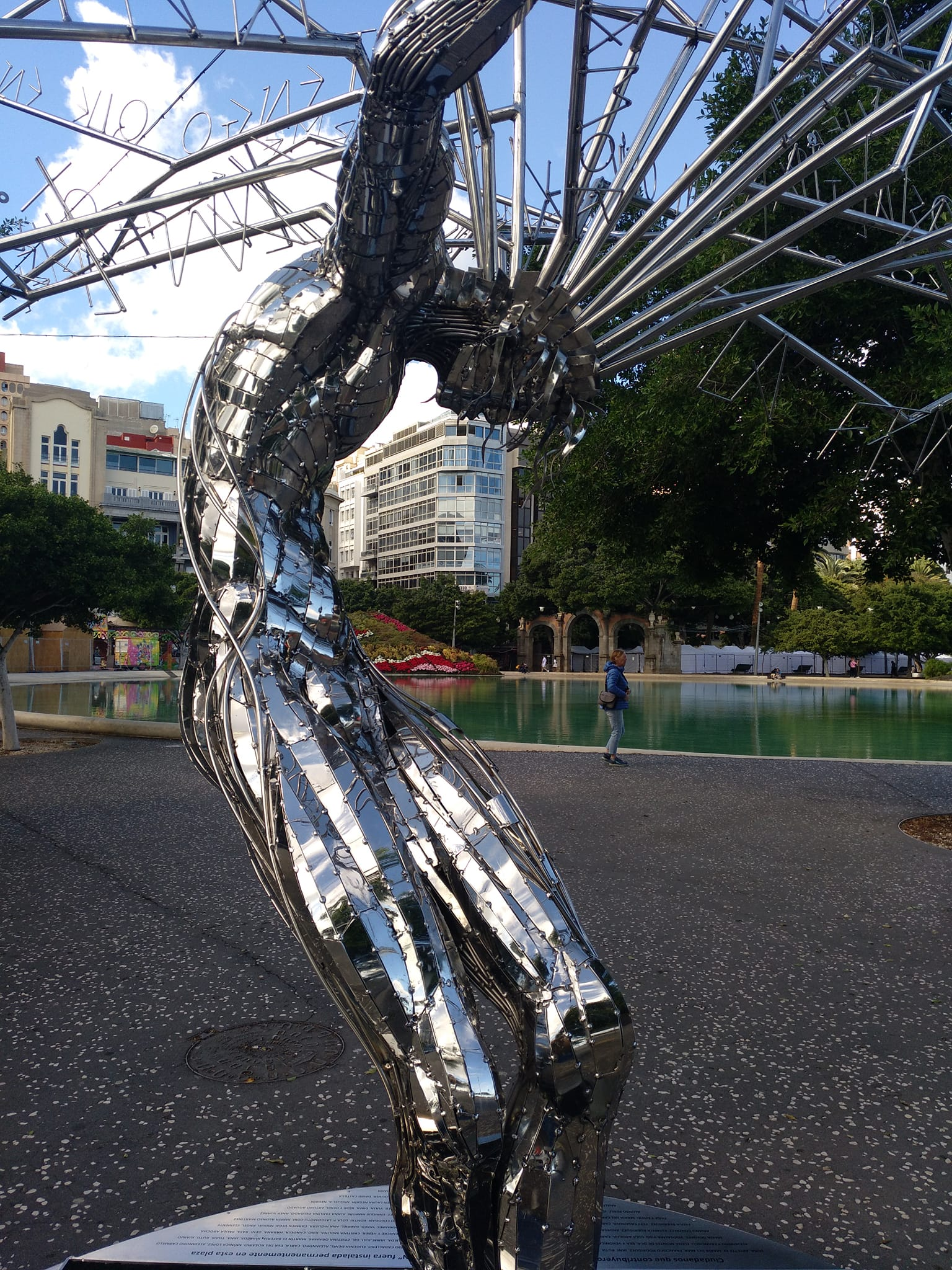
Lo llevo bien by Julio Nieto

=== Cultural events ===
- Festival de Música Clásica de Canarias.
- Festival de Ópera de Tenerife.
- Tenerife International Film Music Festival
- Festival de Zarzuela de Canarias.
- Festival Santa Blues de Tenerife.
- Plátano Rock Festival.
- MUMES. Mestizo Music Festival.
- Festival de Salsa del Atlántico.
- Carnival of Santa Cruz de Tenerife
- Día de la Cruz (Cross Day)
- Rock Coast Festival
- Premios Cadena Dial
- Recreation Gesta July 25
- Tenerife Zombie Walk

=== Nightlife ===
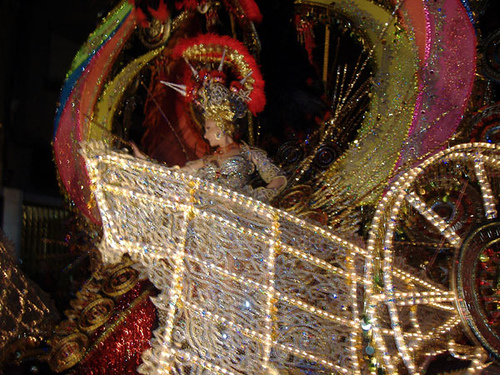
Queen of the Carnival of Santa Cruz de Tenerife. This carnival is one of the largest in the world.

Santa Cruz has not been characterized by an intense night life, in contrast to the nearby university town of La Laguna. Nevertheless, there are several clubs and pubs spread across the city. There are also pubs that have survived without belonging to a particular location for leisure.

It has recently gained importance as a leisure street Antonio Dominguez Alfonso (popularly known as Calle La Noria) and adjacent in the vicinity of the Church of the Conception. After several years of neglect, all the houses in this area has been recovered by the local hotel as tapas, light dinner and drinks. This street also hosts the headquarters of several murgas, music groups linked to Carnival, and independent organ of Events and Recreation.

Avenida de Anaga, also known as Avenida Francisco la Roche in its initial section, is a popular spot for enjoying dinner and drinks, especially along the avenues bordering the port. Back in the 1990s, it thrived as the city's nightlife center. However, many establishments closed due to licensing and noise restrictions.

Currently, efforts are underway to restore Avenida de Anaga's former glory. Since 2009, the city has implemented various initiatives to revitalize the area.

In 2007, an ambitious city revitalization plan named "Santa Cruz + Viva" was launched by the City Council in collaboration with the Society for Development, Cabildo Insular de Tenerife, and the Government of the Canary Islands.

=== Carnival ===
During the Carnival of Santa Cruz de Tenerife, thousands of people take to the streets each year for over a week. On 18 January 1980 it was declared a Fiesta of International Tourist Interest by the Secretary of State for Tourism, and is one of the world's largest carnivals. At present, the Carnival of Santa Cruz hopes to become a World Heritage Site.

=== Masonic influence ===
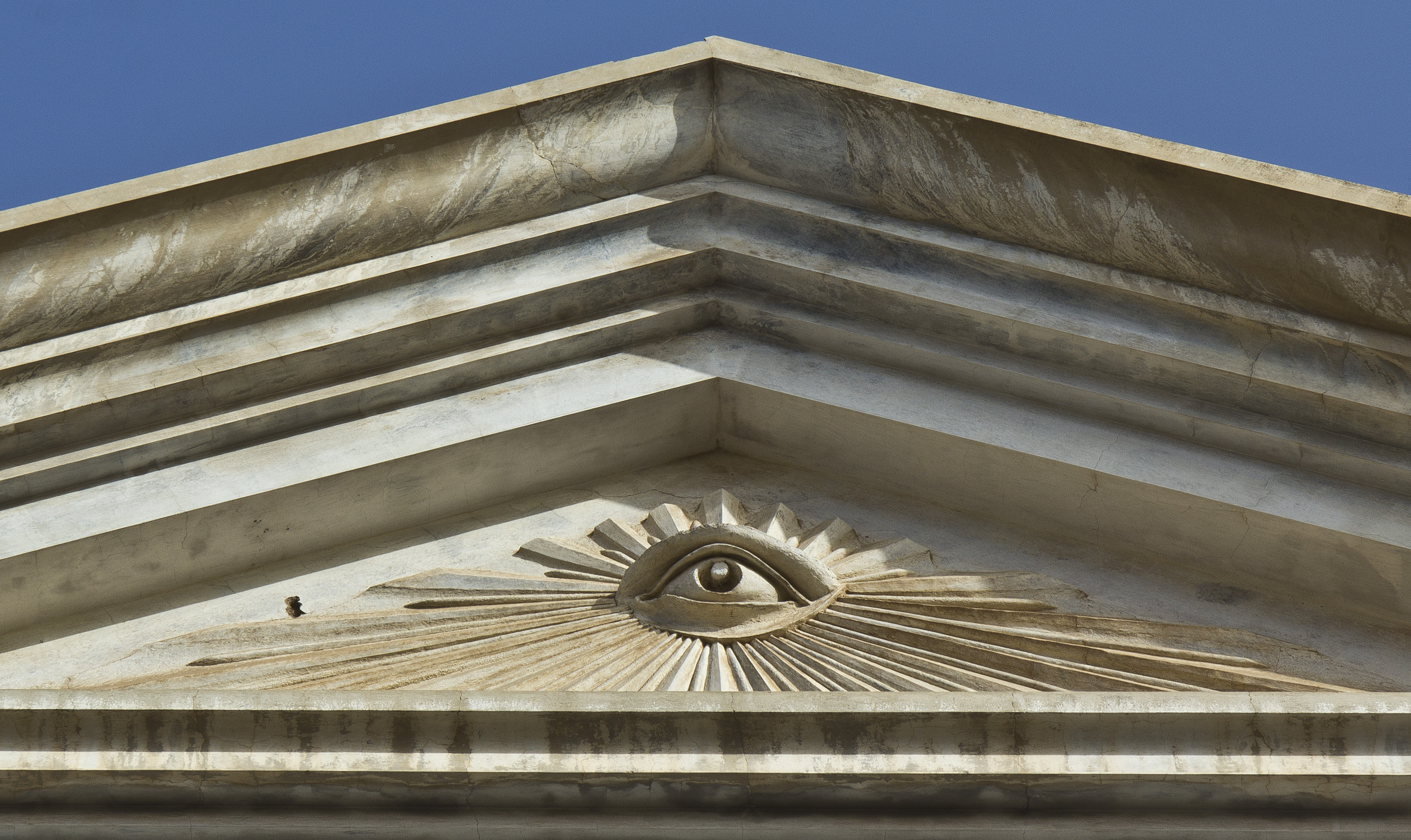
Eye of Providence, on the facade of the Masonic Temple of Santa Cruz de Tenerife

Santa Cruz de Tenerife is characterized, among other things, by the influence of Freemasonry exhibited by some of the most important historical buildings in the city, a palpable influence even on the plane of the city.

The city had a significant number of mayors and politicians affiliated with Freemasonry, especially between the 19th and early 20th centuries. In this city the Añaza Lodge (Logia Añaza) was founded in 1895, which was one of the most important Masonic workshops in Spain in the 20th century and helped consolidate Freemasonry in the Canary Islands and spread the culture and ideas of progress in the Canarian society of the time. Under its auspices the Masonic Temple of Santa Cruz de Tenerife will be built, located on Calle San Lucas and which was the largest Masonic center in Spain until the military occupation of the Franco regime.

The influence of Masonic symbolism on the architecture and urban planning of the city has been the subject of various academic studies, from the works of Professor Sebastián Hernández Gutiérrez of the University of Las Palmas de Gran Canaria, through the studies of Professor David Martín López from the University of Granada. More recently those of the architect Carlos Pallés, curator of the exhibitions "Rostros de La Logia Añaza" and "Masonería y Sociedad" held in 2014.

Melchor Padilla, professor of Geography and History at the University of La Laguna, maintains that by joining some of the buildings and enclaves with Masonic symbols of the city, they form a pentacle or five-pointed star that would extend through the center of the city and whose center would be the García Sanabria Park.

In 2016 an international Masonic congress was held in Santa Cruz de Tenerife in which 17 regular supreme councils from different countries of the world participated, around 300 people participated in the congress. At present there are several tourist routes with a Masonic theme that are organized in the city.

Some of the buildings and places with Masonic symbols in the city are:

- Palacio Insular de Tenerife
- Chamber of Commerce building
- Parque García Sanabria
- Cemetery of San Rafael and San Roque
- Museo Municipal de Bellas Artes de Santa Cruz de Tenerife
- Masonic Temple of Santa Cruz de Tenerife

== Sites of interest ==
=== Tourist sites ===
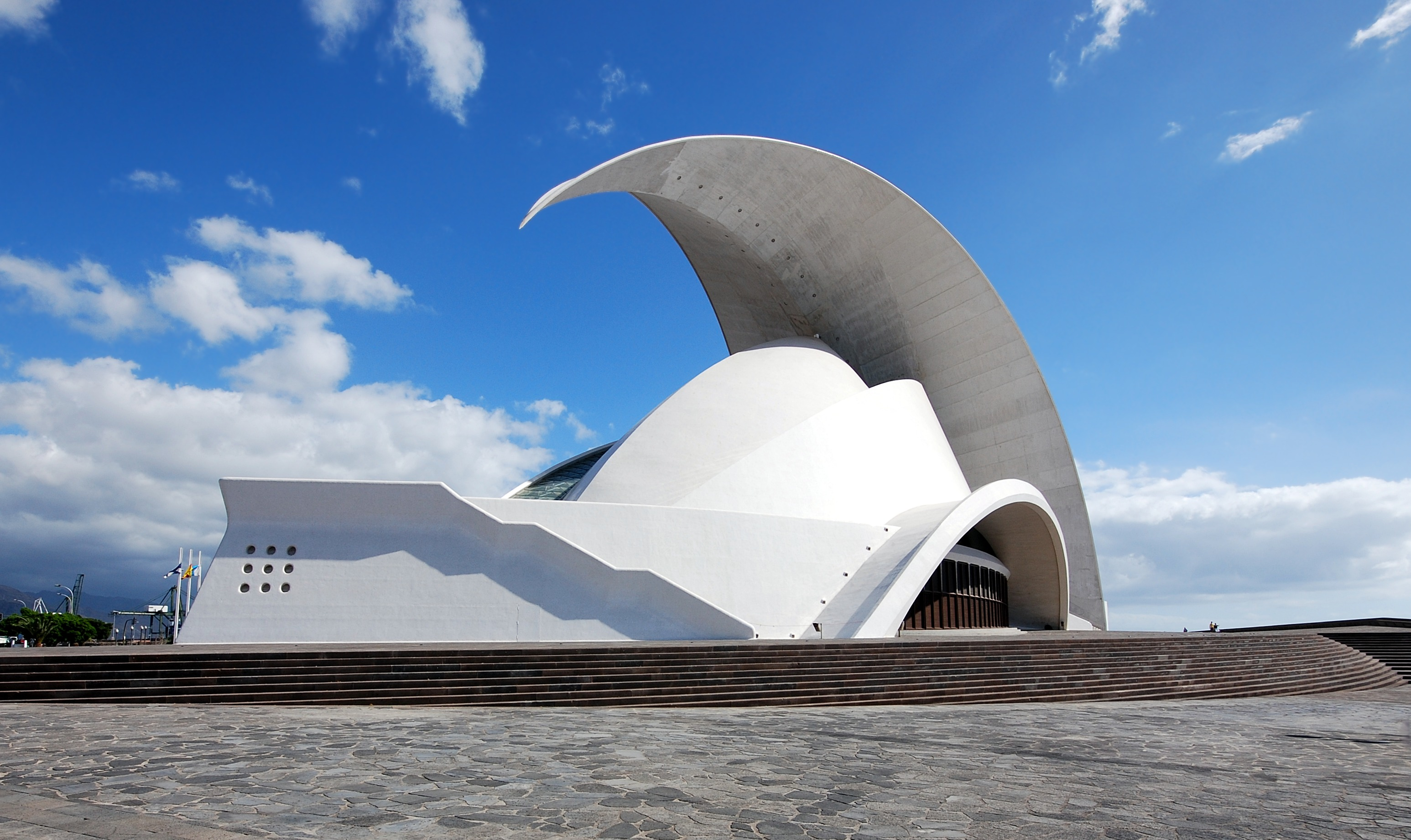
Tenerife Opera House (Auditorio de Tenerife)

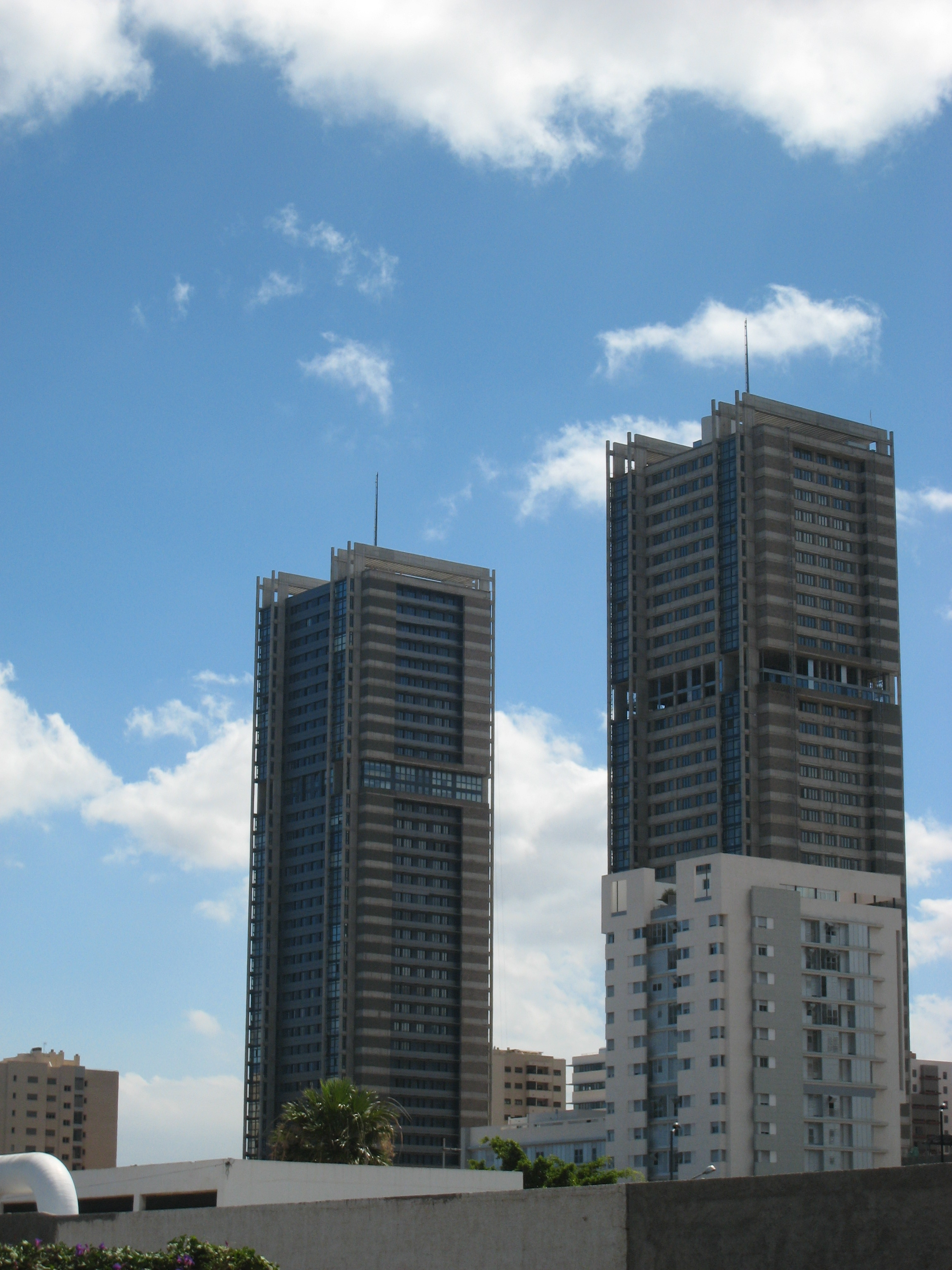
Torres de Santa Cruz (Santa Cruz Towers), the tallest twin towers in Spain

- Auditorio de Tenerife (Auditorium of Tenerife): Designed by Santiago Calatrava, the Auditorium of Tenerife was constructed in 2003. The building has an organic and famous structure in the shape of 'sails' with white, blue rollers. The auditorium has a big room for concerts, a room for opera and other smaller rooms. It is an emblem of the city and is one of the more photographed buildings. This building is in the Port of Santa Cruz de Tenerife close to the sea. It was inaugurated on 26 September 2003 with the presence of Felipe de Borbón, Prince of Asturias, and was also visited by former U.S. President Bill Clinton. The profile of the famous and majestic auditorium has become a symbol of the city of Santa Cruz de Tenerife. It is one of the main attractions of Tenerife and the Canary Islands.
- Torres de Santa Cruz (Towers of Santa Cruz): Twin towers finished in 2006 are the highest skyscrapers of the city and the Canary Islands, was the tallest residential building in Spain until 2010. The Torres de Santa Cruz are also the tallest twin towers in Spain.
- Plaza de España (Spain Square): is the largest square in the city of Santa Cruz de Tenerife and the Canary Islands. The square is located in the center of town, just meters north of the Auditorio de Tenerife. It is the heart of the city, stands the great artificial lake source or work of Swiss architects Herzog & de Meuron.
- Tenerife Espacio de las Artes (Tenerife Space of Arts – TEA): Building designed by the Swiss firm of architects Herzog & de Meuron and directed by the Canary architect Virgilio Gutierrez Herreros. The building houses the contemporary museum Óscar Domínguez Institute, the Alejandro Cioranescu Island Library and the Center for Photography Island of Tenerife. In addition, the property has a hall, a restaurant, a shop, a public plaza, offices.
- Parque García Sanabria: is a public urban park in the heart of Santa Cruz de Tenerife, it was inaugurated in 1926. It is a large garden area, combined with fountains and architectural groups. It is the largest urban park in the Canary Islands. It has an area of 67,230 m^{2} (723,658 sq ft).
- Centro Internacional de Ferias y Congresos de Tenerife (Tenerife International Centre for Trade Fairs and Congresses): The complex was designed by architect and engineer Santiago Calatrava is configured as a multipurpose building that can host major fairs, exhibitions and conferences that take place on the island of Tenerife. The Great Hall, located on the top floor, took a total of 12,000 square meters, making it the largest covered space in the Canary Islands.
- Playa de Las Teresitas: is a beach in the village of San Andrés municipality of Santa Cruz de Tenerife. It is one of the most important beaches of the Tenerife and the Canary Islands.
- Museo de la Naturaleza y el Hombre (Museum of Nature and Man) is a museum of archeology and biology that has participated in international meetings on archeology, but his fame is mainly due to its formidable collection of Guanche mummies. For this reason, the Museum of Nature and Man is a world reference in regard to preservation of mummies.
- Masonic Temple of Santa Cruz de Tenerife: Is a Masonic Temple located in the on San Lucas street. It is considered the finest example of Masonic Temple in Spain. Similarly was even greater in Spain Masonic Center before it was occupied by Franco's military.

=== Attractions ===
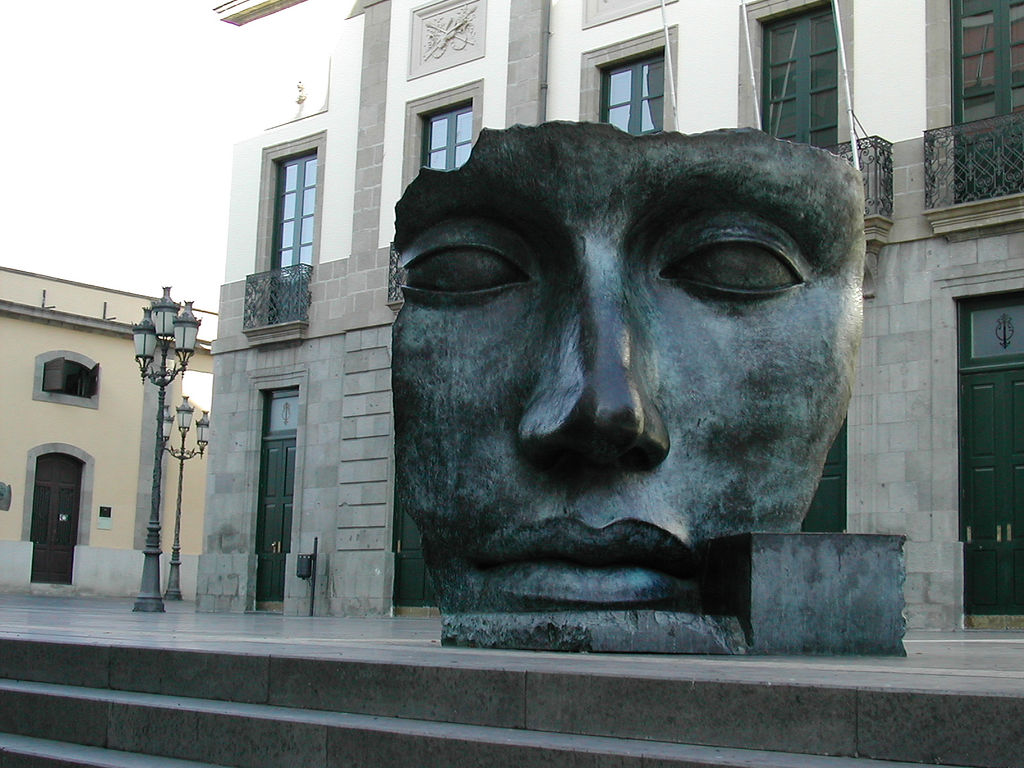
Per Adriano, (1993), sculpture by Igor Mitoraj in front of Guimerá Theatre

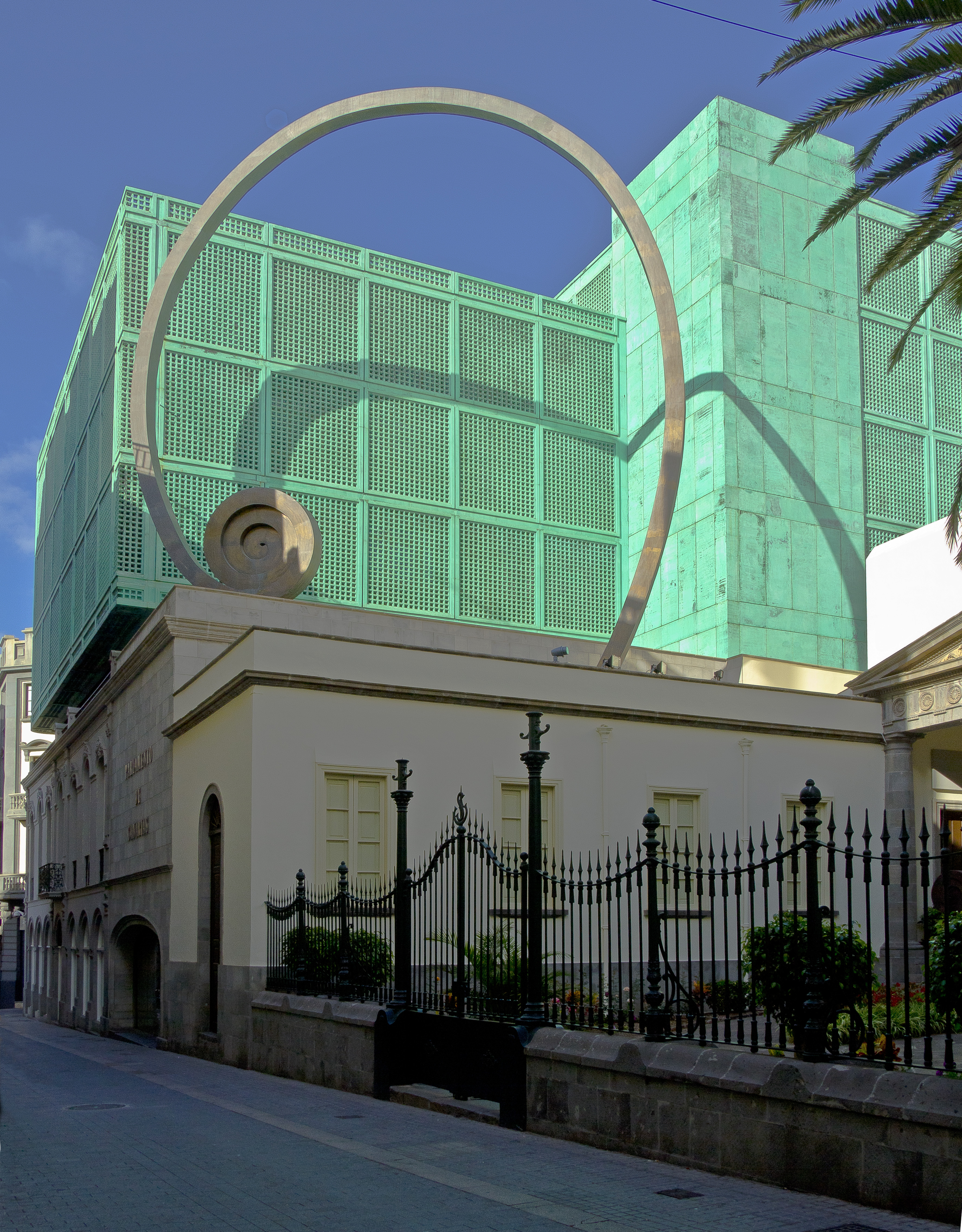
The parliament of the Canary Islands

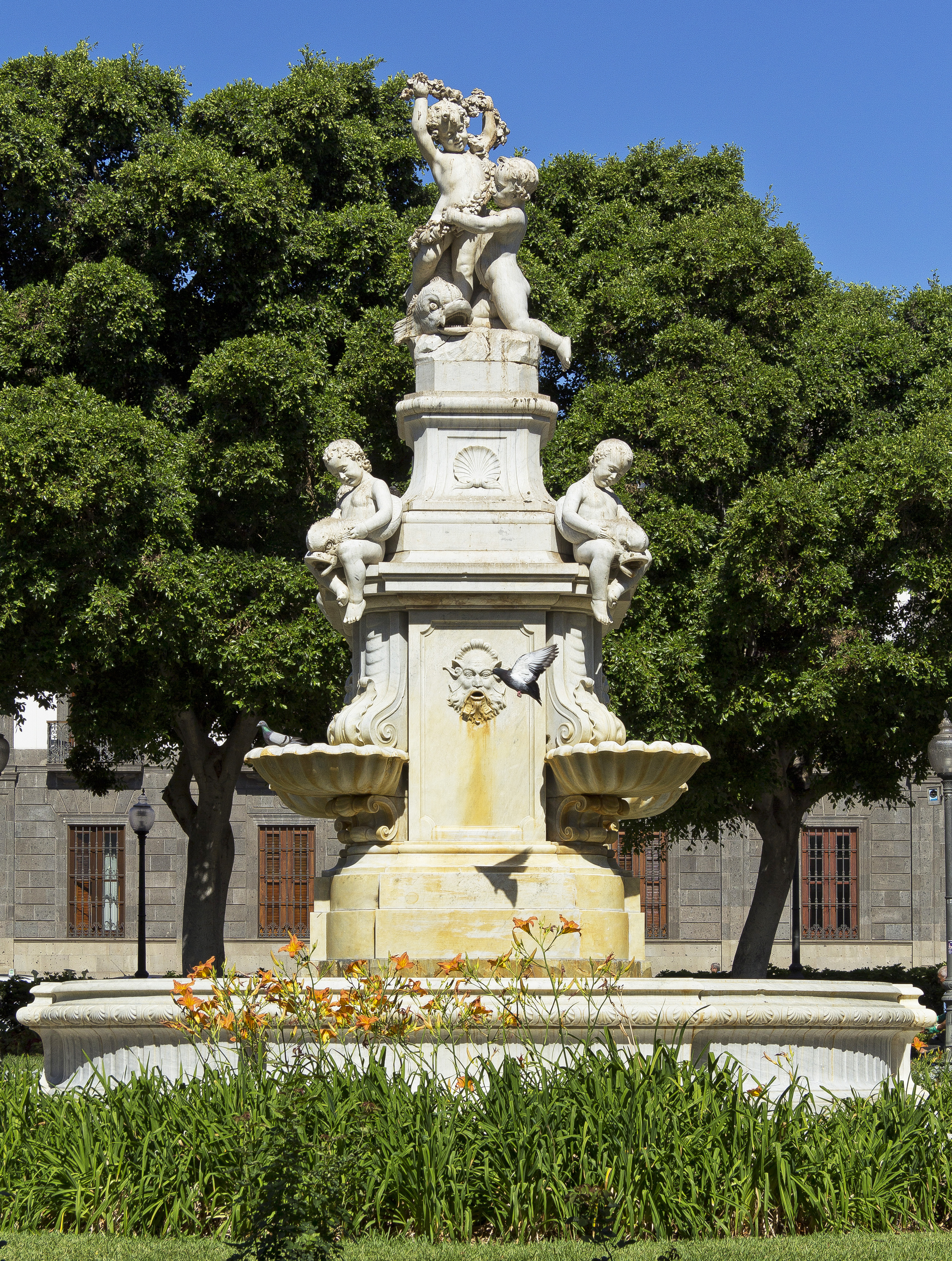
Fountain at the Plaza Weyler

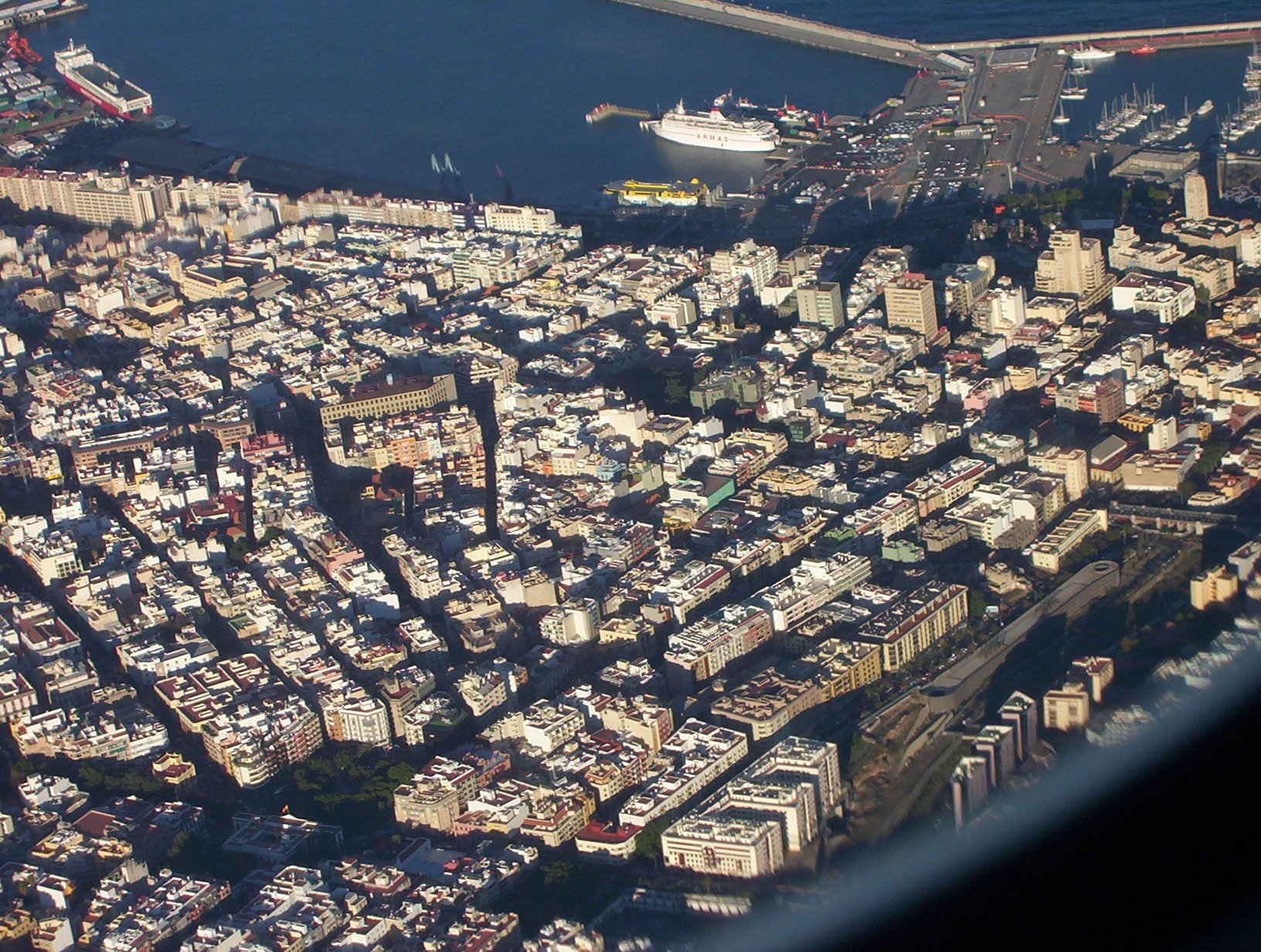
Aerial view

- Calle de la Noria
- Palmetum of Santa Cruz de Tenerife
- Museo de la Naturaleza y el Hombre
- Parque Marítimo César Manrique
- Playa de Las Teresitas
- Auditorio de Tenerife
- Teatro Guimerá
- Museo Municipal de Bellas Artes de Santa Cruz de Tenerife
- Palacio Insular de Tenerife
- Casa del Carnaval (Carnival House of Santa Cruz de Tenerife)
- Masonic Temple of Santa Cruz de Tenerife

In the environs:

- Macizo de Anaga
  - Igueste de San Andrés
  - Taganana
  - San Andrés

=== Skyscrapers ===
- Torres de Santa Cruz
- Rascacielos de la avenida Tres de Mayo
- Edificio Olimpo
- Edificio Juan Amador

=== Parks and squares ===
- Parque García Sanabria
- Parque de La Granja
- Plaza de 25 de julio (de los Patos)
- Plaza de España
- Plaza de la Candelaria
- Plaza del Príncipe
- Plaza de Weyler
- Plaza del Chicharro

=== Churches and historical monuments ===
- Iglesia de La Concepción (church)
- Iglesia de San Francisco de Asís (church)
- Iglesia de Nuestra Señora del Pilar (church)
- Iglesia de San José (church)
- Cabildo Insular de Tenerife (governing body of the island)
- Castle of St John the Baptist or Castillo Negro
- Castle of San Cristóbal
- Castle of San Andrés
- Parlamento de Canarias (Parliament of the Canary Islands)
- Masonic Temple of Santa Cruz de Tenerife

== Commercial areas ==
Santa Cruz is popular for its wide commercial offerings, including zona Centro (Central part) – Pedestrian calle Castillo, San José, del Pilar, Viera y Clavijo Zona Rambla (Rambla area) or Rambla de Pulido, calle Ramón y Cajal, and the big shopping centres and department stores in Avenida de 3 Mayo, plus the big malls in Añaza on the southern suburbs. The most upmarket and high street shopping is located along Calle del Pilar and nearby Parque Bulevar Shopping Centre, where many designer shops can be found. International and local brands of shops and restaurants are much present on the island. Not only the wide range of shops makes the city attractive but the lower prices found in many items, such as tobacco, alcohol, electronic devices, beauty products, sunglasses or even food or coffee. They are indeed much lower than in most cities of Western Europe including Spain, due to the very special and much lighter taxation on goods enjoyed on the Canary Islands.

== Sports ==
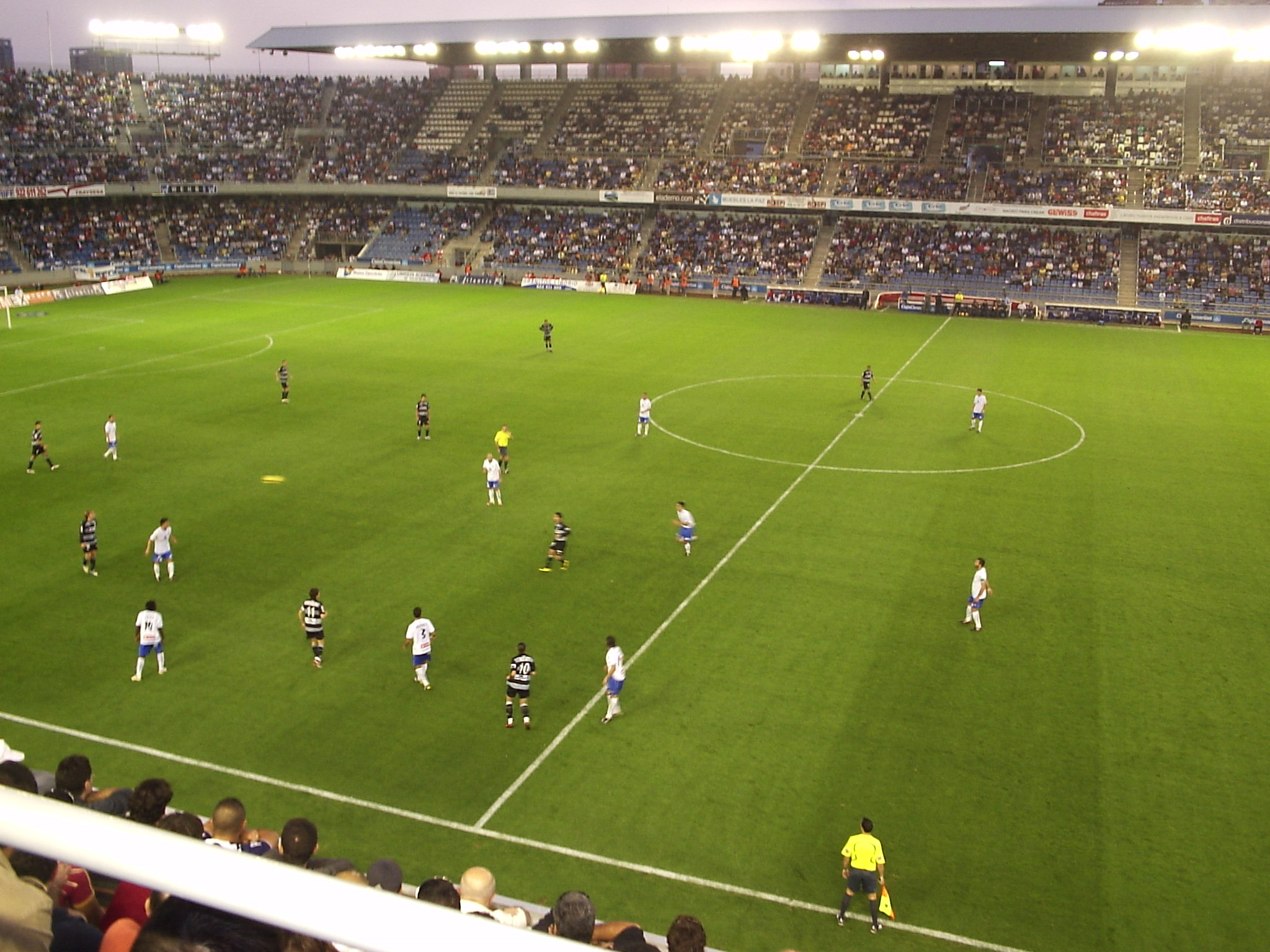
Estadio Heliodoro Rodríguez López, the stadium of CD Tenerife

- CD Tenerife: Founded in 1912, it currently plays in Segunda División, holding home matches at the Estadio Heliodoro Rodríguez López, with a 22,824-seat capacity.

Honours: In 1991, Argentine Jorge Valdano took charge of the club as manager, and would help rob former side Real Madrid of two consecutive league titles in the last round, to the benefit of FC Barcelona; in the first season, the Canary Islands outfit barely avoided relegation, but would finish in a best-ever fifth position in the following year, eventually reaching the round of 16 in the subsequent UEFA Cup, losing to Juventus 2–4 on aggregate. CF Tenerife has finished in fifth position in La Liga on two occasions, in 1992–93 and 1995–96. It is the only Canary team that has played a European competition.

- CV Tenerife: Volleyball is one of the island's most successful sports, particularly in women's volleyball where CV Tenerife were European champions and participate in the Spanish Super League.[9] Two other teams are the women's CV Aguere 2009/2010 Super League champions[10] and the men's Arona Playa de las Américas which competes in the Spanish Super League. There is a growing interest in this sport in Tenerife.
- Lenovo Tenerife: is a professional basketball team based in San Cristóbal de La Laguna, Tenerife, Canary Islands, and plays in the Pabellón Insular Santiago Martín, in Liga ACB league.

== Infrastructure ==
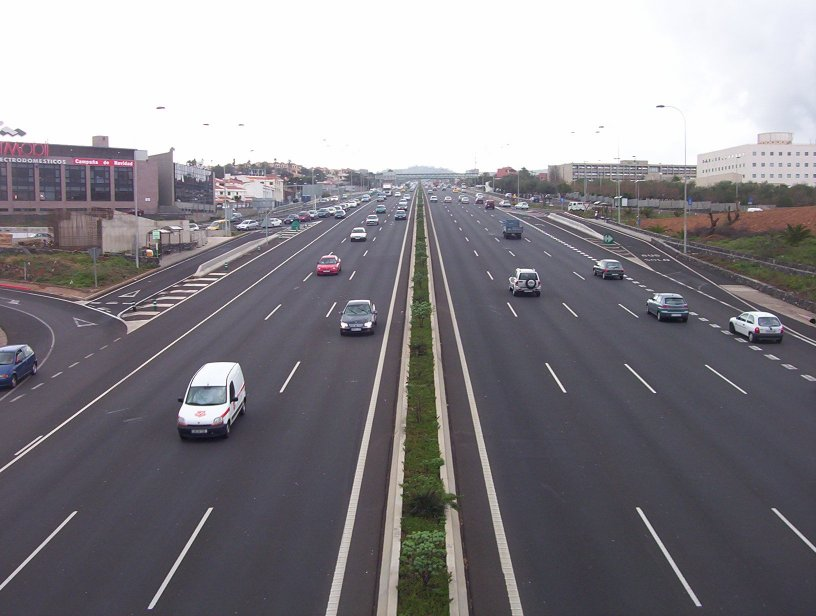
Autopista TF-5 passing by the Guajara Commercial Area and the Central Campus

As the centre of the Tenerife Metropolitan Area, Santa Cruz is the hub for the island's motorway network. The 85 km (53 mi) long Autopista TF-1 links the south of the island, including Playa de las Américas and other southern resorts and towns, with its capital. The motorway itself starts near the Auditorio and gives access to Santa Cruz and La Laguna by three different routes.

Autopista TF-5 links Santa Cruz with the Puerto de la Cruz, La Orotava and the northern side of the island, passing right through La Laguna before entering Santa Cruz.

The Santa Cruz harbour is one of the busiest in Spain; three quays host regular ferries, fast ferries, cruise ships and merchant ships.

Tenerife North Airport, formerly Los Rodeos Airport, is adjacent to Autopista TF-5 on the western outskirts of the city.

The mostly tourist Tenerife South Airport, formerly Reina Sofia Airport, ranks 7th in Spain and is located next to the Autopista TF-1, 75 km (47 mi) south of Santa Cruz. There are plans to link this airport to the capital with a railway network.

The Intercambiador public transport/mass transit terminal is in the Avenida 3 de Mayo, and is the hub for all TITSA bus lines, the Tenerife Tram service, and is a major car-parking area.

The first tram line (opened in 2007) line 1, starts at the Intercambiador, and ends at La Laguna's Avenida Trinidad, with a planned extension to Tenerife North Airport A second line between La Cuesta and Tíncer opened in 2009 (connecting with Line 1 at Hospital Universitario and El Cardonal).

Cabo-Llanos (south of downtown) is the location of new expansion. This area is undergoing a major building boom which has been nicknamed "Manhattanization", where tall, modern buildings and street layouts imitate American cities.

== Education ==
International schools:

- Lycée Français de Tenerife "Jules Verne" (French school)
- Deutsche Schule Santa Cruz de Tenerife (German school) in nearby El Rosario
- Svenska Skolan Teneriffa (Swedish school) in nearby Arona
- British School of Tenerife with campuses in La Orotava, Los Realejos, and Puerto de la Cruz
- Wingate School (British school) in Arona

== Media ==
In Santa Cruz de Tenerife have drafted the three provincial newspapers (Diario de Avisos, La Opinión de Tenerife and El Día), as well as editors of newspapers regional La Gaceta de Canarias. En marcha (Santa Cruz de Tenerife) is an historical newspaper that was published between 1930–1936.

Also located in the city the headquarters of various TV channels, most of which broadcast on the island: Spanish Television in the Canary Islands, Television Canaria, Antena 3 TV Canary Islands, Television Day, Canal 7 Atlantic, Channel 4 Tenerife, Channel 8, etc. Most radio stations are also located in the city. Radio Club Tenerife (Cadena SER), RNE, Teide Radio-Onda Cero, Radio Day, Radio ECCA etc.. In the city is the headquarters of the TV Canaria.

== Celebrations of the city ==
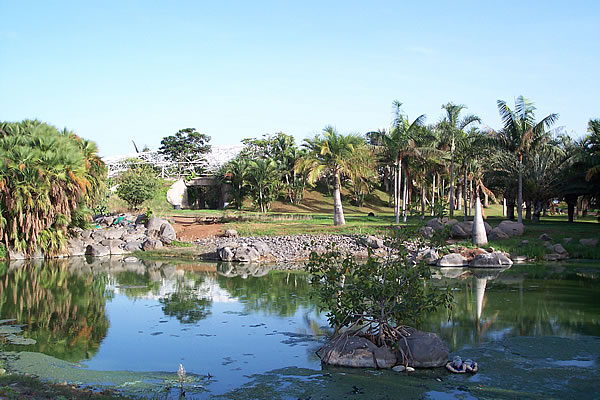
Palmetum of Santa Cruz

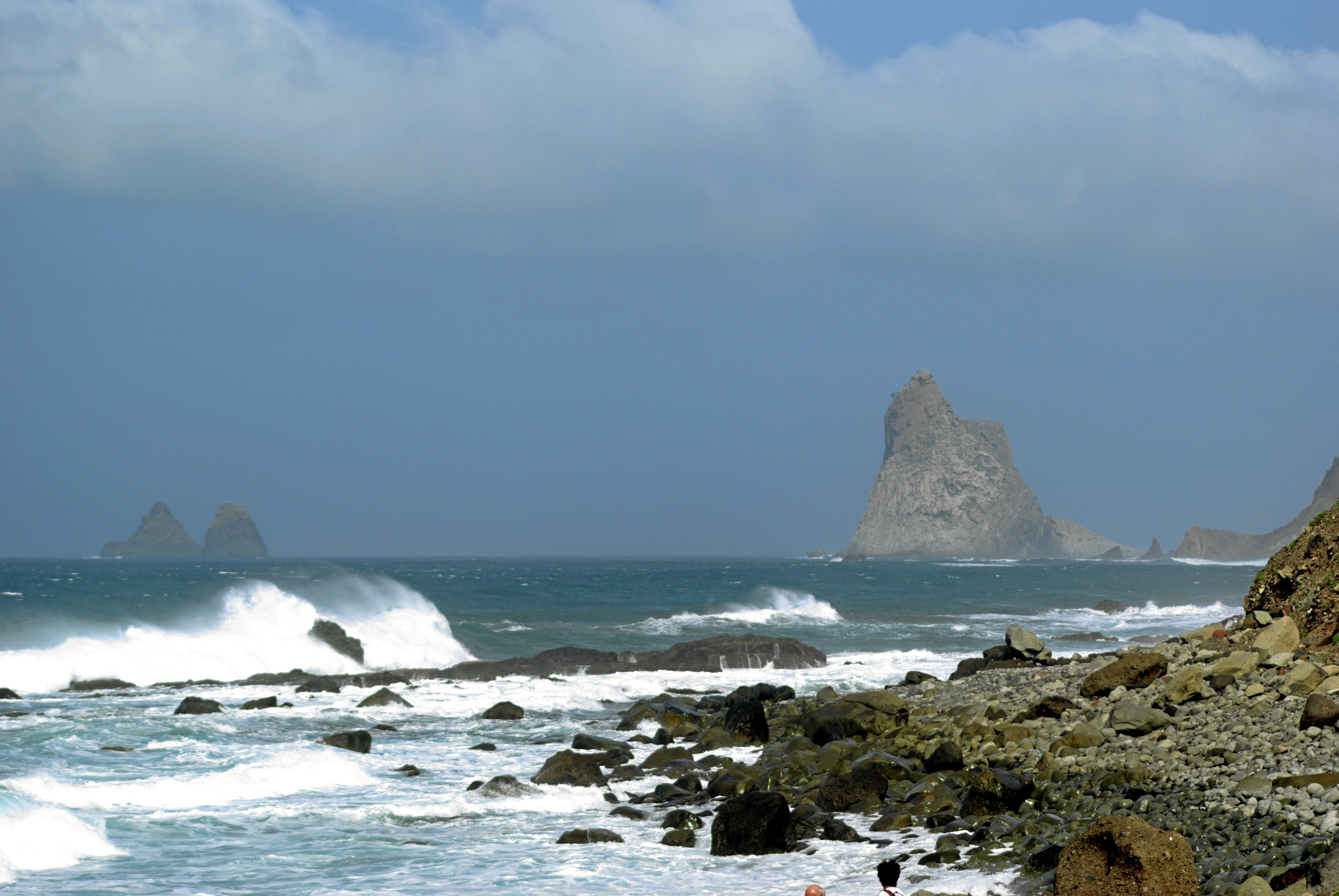
Roques de Anaga

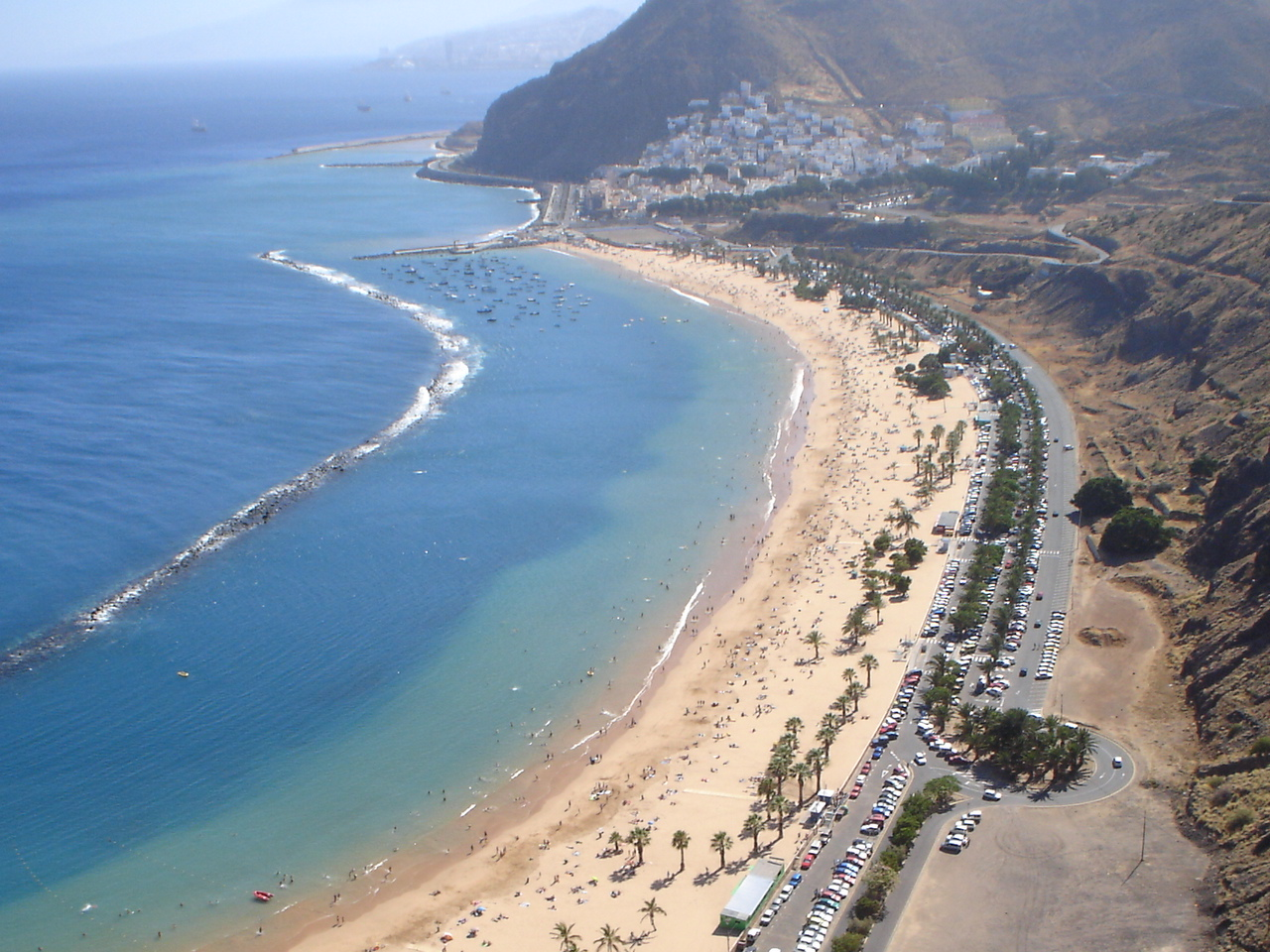
Playa de Las Teresitas

- 27 January, anniversary of the designation of Santa Cruz de Tenerife as the capital of the Canary Islands.
- February, Carnival of Santa Cruz de Tenerife (of International Tourist Interest).
- 3 May, May festivities. Día de la Cruz (Day of the City of Santa Cruz de Tenerife).
- 25 July, the day of Saint James the Great (patron saint of Santa Cruz de Tenerife) and defeat of Admiral Nelson. This festival is part of the acts of the Recreation Gesta July 25.

== Consulates ==
The consulates located in Santa Cruz de Tenerife are:

- Austria
- Argentina
- Belgium
- Bolivia
- Brazil
- Chile
- Colombia
- Costa Rica
- Denmark
- Ecuador
- Finland
- France
- Germany
- Guatemala
- Honduras
- India
- Ireland
- Italy
- Liberia
- Mexico
- Monaco
- Netherlands
- Nicaragua
- Norway
- Peru
- Philippines
- Portugal
- Sri Lanka
- Sweden
- Turkey
- United Kingdom
- Uruguay
- Venezuela

== International relations ==
=== Twin towns – sister cities ===
Santa Cruz de Tenerife is twinned with:

Aranda de Duero, Spain; San Antonio, US; Santa Cruz, California, US; Santa Cruz de la Sierra, Bolivia; Caracas, Venezuela; Cádiz, Spain	Rio de Janeiro, Brazil; Nice, France; Santa Cruz del Norte, Cuba; Guatemala City, Guatemala; Palma de Mallorca, Spain

== Notable people ==
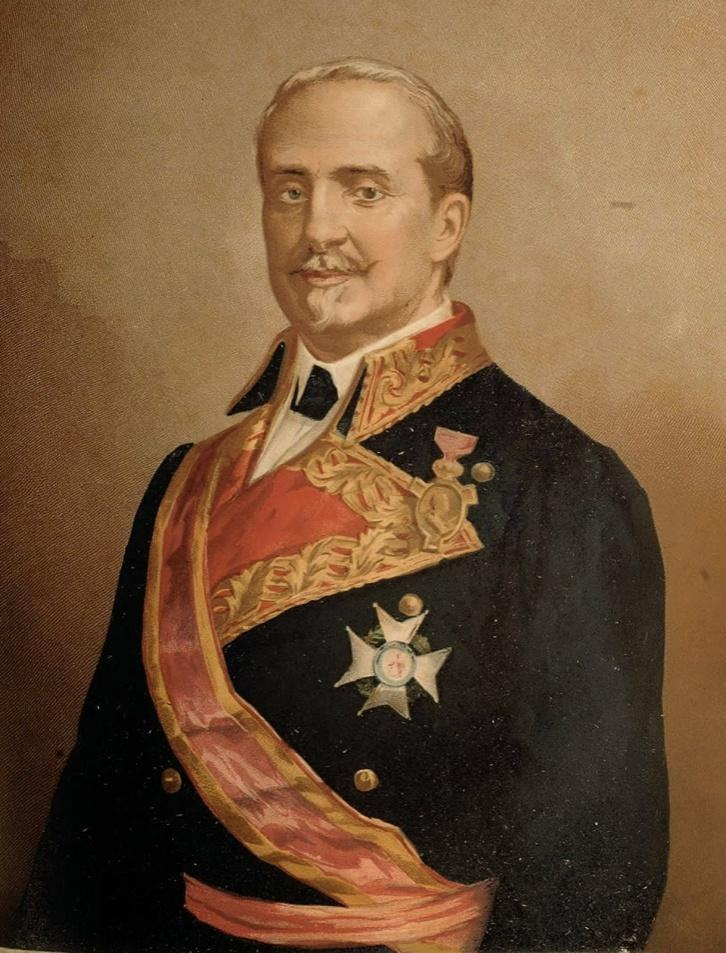
Leopoldo O'Donnell

- Rafael Arozarena (1923–2009), writer
- Ariadna Chueca Moreno (born 1991), basketball referee
- Fernando Fernández Martín (born 1943), politician
- Juan Carlos Fresnadillo (born 1967), film director
- Simón de Herrera (1754–1813), interim governor of Spanish Texas and of Nuevo León.
- Julio Hormiga (born 1985), footballer
- Maria Rozman (1971–), news director of Telemundo Washington, D.C., and Telemundo Denver and Univisión Denver.
- Àngel Guimerà (1845–1924), writer
- Adán Martín Menis (1943–2010), politician
- Luis Molowny (1925–2010), footballer
- Santiago Morales (born 2007), footballer
- Leopoldo O'Donnell (1809–1867), politician
- Alfonso de Orléans-Borbón, Duke of Galliera (born 1968), founder of Racing Engineering
- Ayoze Pérez (born 1993), footballer
- Pedro (born 1987), footballer
- Alberto Vázquez-Figueroa (born 1936), writer
- Eduardo Westerdahl (1902–1983), art critic and author
- Andrew Wolfson (1890–1978), cricketer

== In popular culture ==
- In the 2016 film, the opening part of the movie Jason Bourne was filmed in this city. To do this, the city of Santa Cruz de Tenerife was especially set to simulate the Greek cities of Athens and Piraeus. The Plaza de España which is the main square of city of Santa Cruz, was set to represent Syntagma Square.
- In the 2019 American film Rambo V: Last Blood, which was partly filmed in Santa Cruz de Tenerife, several panoramic sequences of the city appear.
- Some episodes of the British series Doctor Who were filmed in the city.
- Part of the video clip for the song Universo with which the singer Blas Cantó represented Spain in the Eurovision Song Contest 2020 was filmed in the Tenerife Auditorium.
- In the 2021 series The One, they filmed various scenes in the city.
- In the 2021 Foundation series, they filmed various scenes in the city, especially around the auditorium.
- In the Spanish series Una hora menos en Canarias from 2024, emblematic places in Santa Cruz de Tenerife and the island appear.
- The American film Den of Thieves 2: Pantera (2025) was largely shot in Santa Cruz de Tenerife.

== See also ==
- List of municipalities in Santa Cruz de Tenerife (province)
- Plaza de Isabel II (Santa Cruz de Tenerife)
