= Tren de Gran Canaria =

Planned railway line in the Canary Islands

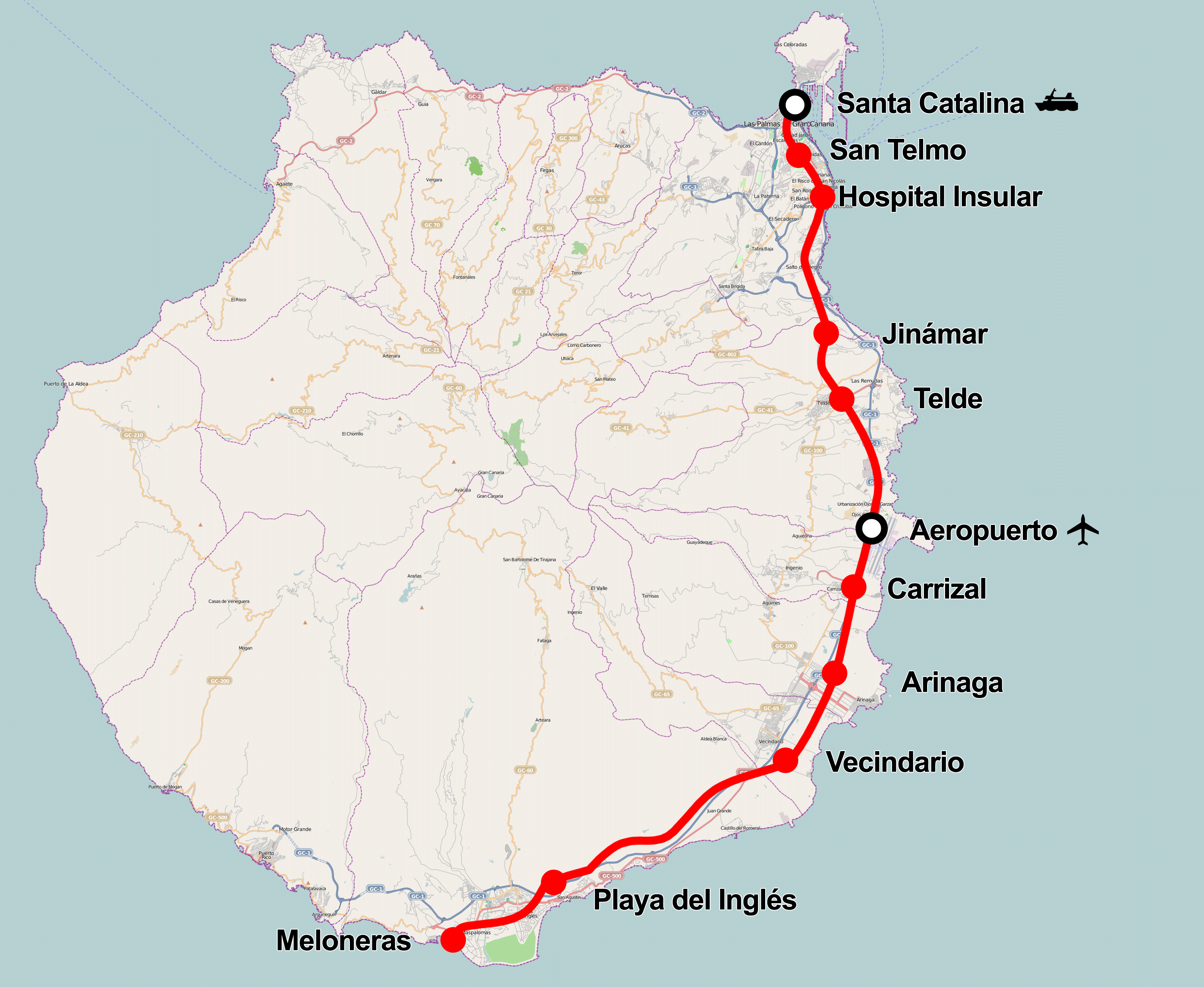
- Map of the proposed route of the Gran Canaria railway

Overview
- Status: Unknown (probably suspended)
- Owner: Cabildo insular
- Locale: Gran Canaria
- Termini: Las Palmas; Meloneras, Maspalomas
- Stations: 11

Service
- Services: 1
- Operator: Autoridad Única del Transporte

History
- Planned opening: Unknown

Technical
- Line length: 57 km (35 mi)
- Track gauge: 1,668 mm (5 ft 5 21/32 in) Iberian gauge
- Operating speed: 160 km/h (99 mph)

Tren de Gran Canaria (TGC, the Train of Gran Canaria) is a proposed railway on the island of Gran Canaria in Spain. It is planned to run from the island's capital, Las Palmas along the eastern coast of the island, serving Gran Canaria Airport and terminating in Maspalomas. First announced in 2004, construction on the line has not yet commenced due to funding difficulties.

== History ==
Between 1893 and 1944 steam trams ran between Las Palmas and Puerto de La Luz. The line was electrified in 1910, although the line reverted to steam traction in 1944, when trams were hauled by a steam locomotive known as La Pepa. A reproduction of this locomotive is now on display in the Elder Museum in Las Palmas.

A plan to build a north–south rail link began with the building of an experimental tren vertebrado ("vertebrate train") track in Las Palmas between 1972 and 1974. The transit system, designed by Basque engineer Alejandro Goicoechea, consisted of an unusual low-profile train running on elevated concrete tracks through Las Palmas. The project was unsuccessful and was dismantled within a year.

Plans to develop a rapid transit railway line on Gran Canaria linking the capital with San Bartolomé de Tirajana in the south were put forward in the early 21st century by the Gran Canaria Cabildo. The line would run along the eastern coast and connect Las Palmas with the airport. In 2004 the Spanish Ministry of Development put a contract out to competitive tender for a feasibility study on a 50 km (31 mi) railway line from Las Palmas to Maspalomas.

Originally, it was planned to construct the railway in phases, with an initial phase consisting of a line running between San Telmo Park in Las Palmas and El Veril Beach on the edge of Playa del Inglés. In future phases the line could be extended northwards into central Las Palmas, with a terminus at Santa Catalina park, and at the southern end the line would be extended through Maspalomas to terminate at Meloneras. In 2008 the Cabildo announced its intention to construct the full route from Las Palmas to Meloneras in a single phase.

In 2009 the plans were approved by the Autonomous Government of the Canary Islands, and a planned operational date was given as 2015. The Cabildo's Autoridad Única del Transporte de Gran Canaria formed a public company called Ferrocarriles de Gran Canaria to manage the construction project. The total cost of the scheme was estimated at €1,500 million.

The Cabildo applied to Spain's central Government for funding for the project, but the scheme did not progress due to budgetary constraints.

In June 2019, the local government announced that it had completed drafting the projects for the route, and the cost of the scheme was estimated at €1,650 million. 85% of the needed funds were planned to be received from the European Regional Development Fund (ERDF), while the remaining 15% would come from local and regional government funding and private finance. However, that money was never received.

Between 2009 and 2023, the Spanish Ministry of Development and the Cabildo spent €32 million on preparatory work for the new railway line.

In 2024, the Cabildo announced that it had decided to prioritize the construction of the section between Aeropuerto and Vecindario. This first phase will cost €390 million and will include train depots and workshops (in Vecindario), as well as a wind farm to generate energy for the trains. It is expected that €190 million will be provided by the Connecting Europe Facility, with the remaining €200 million coming from state and local governments. In June 2024, it was announced that the local government hopes that construction of the train will begin before the end of 2027.

== Route ==
The planned 57-kilometre (35 mi) railway line would run between Las Palmas in the north and Meloneras in the south of the island. The line is planned to have 11 stations, including an underground station at Gran Canaria Airport. Much of the line is planned to run in tunnels, with the section in the capital running entirely underground as far as the suburb of Jinámar.

According to plans published by the Cabildo, stations are planned in Santa Catalina Park, San Telmo Park, the island Hospital, Jinámar, Telde, Gran Canaria Airport, Carrizal, Arinaga, Vecindario, Playa del Inglés and Meloneras. An additional station at Juan Grande has been proposed by the mayor of San Bartolome de Tirajana. Journey times between Las Palmas and Meloneras would be 25–30 minutes.

== Rolling stock ==
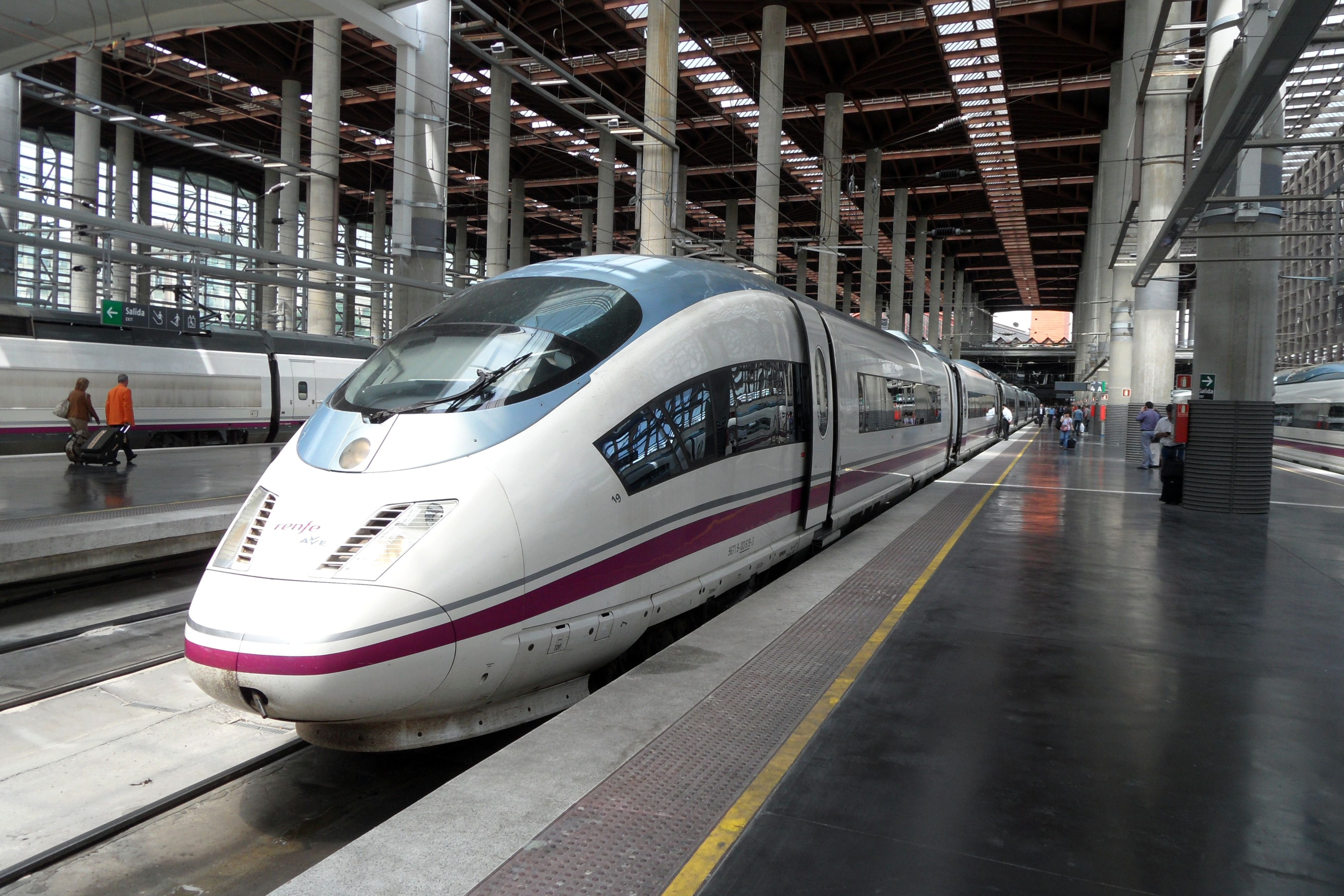
A TGC mockup displayed in 2009 closely resembled a Siemens Velaro AVE Class 103

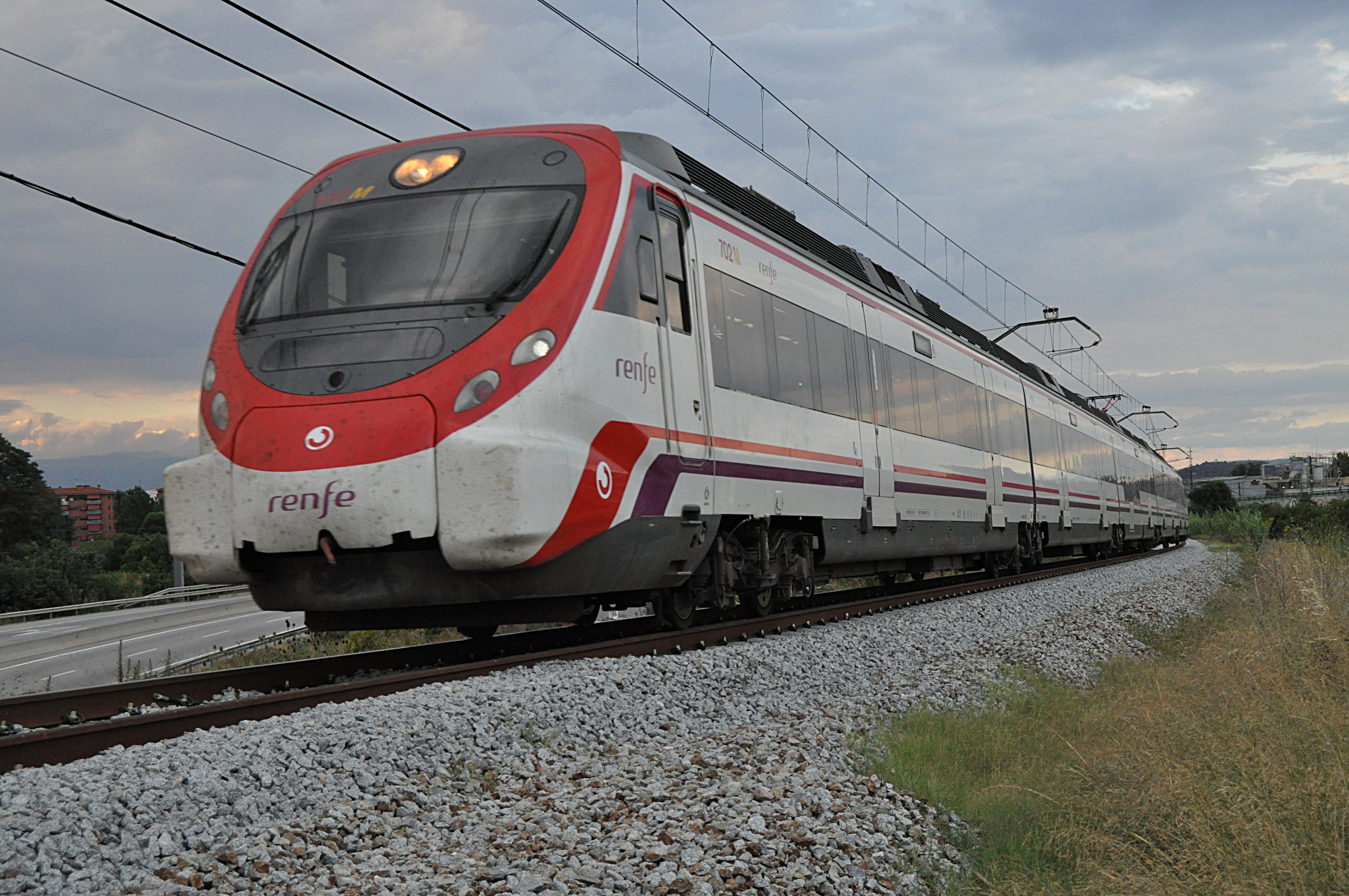
Publicity photos in the Canarian press in 2018 appeared to depict a CAF Civia in TGC livery

The trains that will operate on the Gran Canaria railway are planned to be a hybrid of a commuter train and a high speed train. Initially, ten 100-metre (330 ft) units of five carriages will operate on the line with a maximum speed of 160 kilometres per hour (99 mph), each capable of carrying 500 passengers. Eventually, 13 units will operate on the line.

In 2009, a full-scale mockup of the proposed Gran Canaria train was put on public display in San Telmo park, Las Palmas.

== See also ==
- Tenerife Tram
- Tren del Sur
- Mallorca rail network
- Rail transport in Spain
