= Barranco Hondo =

Neighborhood of Candelaria, Santa Cruz de Tenerife

- Neighborhood
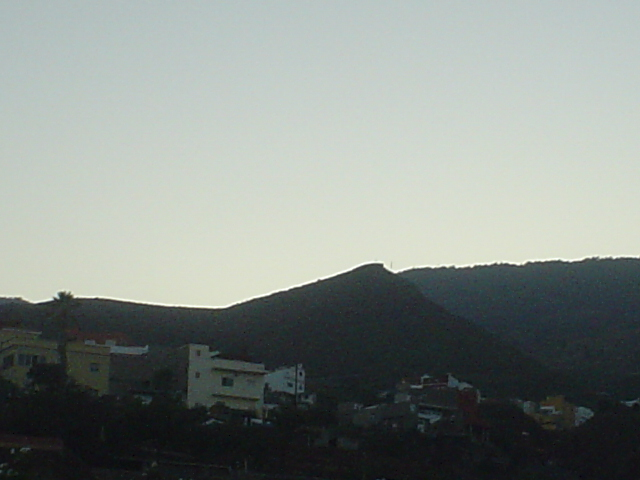
- Interactive map of Barranco Hondo
- Country: Spain
- Autonomous community: Canarias
- Province: Santa Cruz de Tenerife
- Municipality: Candelaria

Area
  - Total: 806 km^{2} (311 sq mi)
- Elevation: 633 m (2,077 ft)

Population (2020)
  - Total: 3,169
  - Density: 393.66/km^{2} (1,019.6/sq mi)
- Demonym(s): barrancohondero, -a
- Postal code: 38510
- Limits: Northern: Las Rosas and Barranco Hondo (El Rosario); East: Atlantic Ocean; South: Atlantic Ocean and Las Caletillas; West: Igueste de Candelaria
- Day of the neighbourhood: March 19
- Patron saint: Saint Joseph; Cristo de la Buena Muerte —compatron—

Barranco Hondo is a population entity belonging to the municipality of Candelaria, on the island of Tenerife, Canary Islands, Spain.

== Toponymy ==
The neighborhood receives its name from the geographical feature that crosses it, a ravine that has its source at 1478 meters above sea level in the Cordillera Dorsal of the island and that flows into the sea after approximately ten kilometers.

== Characteristics ==
Located outside the valley of Güímar, about ten kilometers from the urban center of Candelaria, reaching an average altitude of 630 m above sea level. It has an area of 8.05 km^{2} that includes, in addition to the urban center, an extensive natural area that includes a small part of the Protected Landscape of Las Lagunetas and the Public Utility Mount Fayal, Valle y Chafa.

The topography and the slope have conditioned the location of the houses along the branch road that connects with the Carretera General del Sur in the vicinity of the ravine that gives it its name.

The neighborhood has a church dedicated to San José, the Poeta Antonio Alberto Alonso cultural center, the Carmen Álvarez de la Rosa public school, a doctor's office, a morgue and cemetery, a public park, several squares and playgrounds, sports facilities —two sports centers and a municipal soccer field—, a gas station, a post office, a bank, a pharmacy, as well as stores, bars and restaurants. In the coastal area of the town there is a natural swimming pool next to the beach of Barranco Hondo and the sports club Círculo de la Amistad XII de Enero.

In Barranco Hondo are also located the viewpoints of Los Guanches and Picacho.

== Demographics ==
Demographic variation of Barranco Hondo
Year	2000	2001	2002	2003	2004	2005	2006	2007	2008	2009	2010	2011	2012	2013	2014	2015	2016	2017	2018	2019	2020	2021
Inhabitants	1.799	1.781	1.831	1.910	2.024	2.153	2.295	2.438	2.578	2.743	2.807	2.922	2.988	2.990	3.032	3.013	3.059	3.024	3.049	3.086	3.169	3.167

== History ==
The village of Barranco Hondo was founded in the 16th century with the establishment of peasant settlers. However, its consolidation took place during the 18th century.

From the end of the 19th century until the middle of the following century, the town had a mayor or ward mayor.

=== Religion ===
The hermitage of Saint Joseph was built in 1860, being elevated to the rank of parish in 1943. In this place the images of Nuestra Señora de los Dolores, Virgen de la Encarnación, Santa Teresa de Jesús, San Francisco de Asís, San Antonio de Padua, San Sebastián, San Lázaro, el Niño Jesús, el Señor Difunto (Cristo Yacente), San Alberto Magno, the new image of Cristo Crucificado and Santo Domingo de Guzmán are also venerated.

Around 1860 a Calvary was built with three wooden crosses. After being destroyed by a neighbor, it was rebuilt in 1885. Destroyed again, it would be rebuilt and transformed into a Calvary chapel on two other occasions, in 1953 and 1986. Since 1969 the image of the Santísimo Cristo de la Buena Muerte has been venerated there. The three crosses of Calvary are also found there and the images of the Virgin of Pity, the doctor and servant of God José Gregorio, Santa Rita, Santa Lucía, the Holy Family and the Virgin of Candelaria are venerated there.

In 1920 the chapel of the Cristo de Limpias was built. After being destroyed, it was rebuilt in 1989. In this place are also venerated the images of St. John the Evangelist, the Virgin of Candelaria, the doctor and servant of God José Gregorio, St. Joseph and the Virgin of the Macarena.

In 1946 the cemetery of San José was built. It has the name of the day of its blessing.

In 1991 the chapel of San Antonio de Padua was built. The images of the Virgin La Milagrosa, the Virgen del Carmen and Santa Gema Galgani are also venerated in this place.

== Economy ==
Agriculture never reached the sufficient development, so the population has had to seek employment abroad, mainly in Santa Cruz de Tenerife.

== Festivals ==
In the area of Barranco Hondo, patron saint festivities are celebrated in honor of San José in the month of March, with religious and popular events, highlighting the traditional pilgrimage of San José since 1983.

In the second week of July, events are held in honor of the Cristo de la Buena Muerte.

The neighborhood also celebrates festivities in honor of the Virgen de los Dolores during the second week of October.

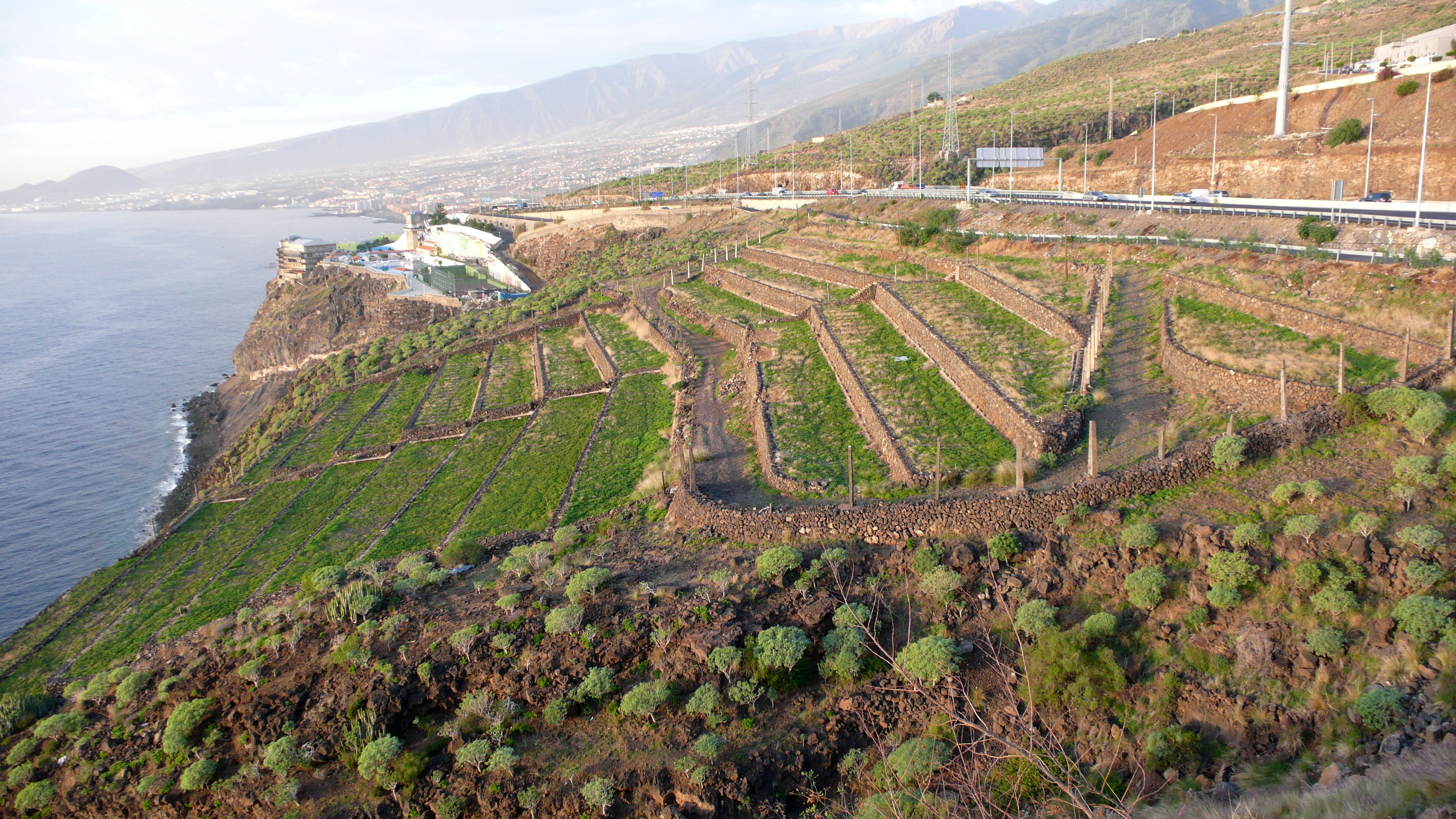
Abandoned farm and facilities of the Círculo de la Amistad XII de Enero under the TF-1 highway.

== Communications ==
The neighborhood can be reached mainly by the Carretera General del Sur TF-28 and the Autopista del Sur TF-1.

=== Public transport ===
By bus —guagua— it is connected by the following TITSA lines:

Line	Route	Tour
111	Sta. Cruz - South Airport - Los Cristianos - Costa Adeje	Schedule/Lines (in Spanish)
112	Sta. Cruz - Arona (by Costa del Silencio)	Schedule/Lines (in Spanish)
115	Sta. Cruz - Las Galletas - Costa del Silencio	
116	Sta. Cruz - Granadilla (by El Médano)	
120	Sta. Cruz - Güímar (by Candelaria and Puertito de Güímar)	
121	Sta. Cruz - Güímar (by Arafo)	
122	Sta. Cruz - Las Caletillas - Candelaria and Polígono Industrial de Güímar	
123	Sta. Cruz - Araya (by Las Caletillas and Candelaria)	Schedule/Lines (in Spanish)
124	Sta. Cruz - Güímar (by Candelaria and Polígono I. de Güímar)	Schedule/Lines (in Spanish)
126	Candelaria - Guajara (University) - H. U. La Candelaria - Intercambiador SC	
127	Taco - Güímar (by Barranco Hondo and Candelaria)	
131	Sta. Cruz - Igueste de Candelaria (by Las Caletillas)	Schedule/Lines (in Spanish)
142	Sta. Cruz - Añaza - Acorán - Barranco Hondo	

== Roads ==
From Barranco Hondo starts one of the approved paths of the Tenerife Footpath Network:

- SL-TF 299 Lomo El Centeno

== Places of interest ==
- Club Deportivo Círculo de la Amistad XII de Enero (XII of January)
- Viewpoints of Los Guanches and Picacho
- Natural swimming pool of Barranco Hondo

== Gallery ==
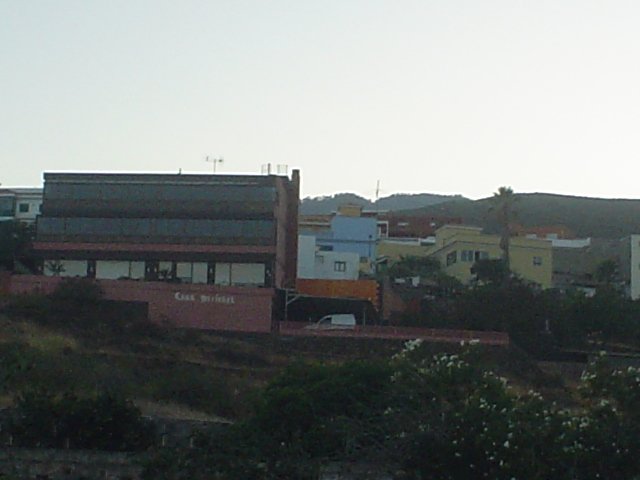
Ascent of Barranco Hondo.

== See also ==
- Badlands

== Bibliography ==
- VVAA (1985). Geografía de Canarias (in Spanish). Editorial Interinsular Canaria. ISBN 84-85543-66-1.
