= Tenerife Tram =

Light rail service in the Canary Islands

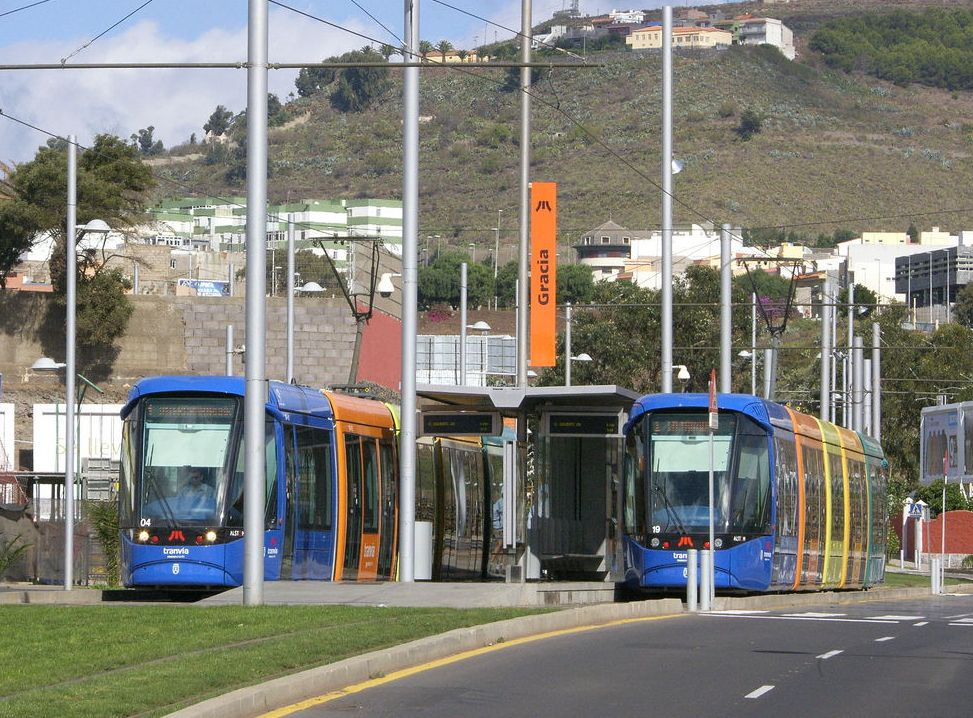
- Two trams at the Gracia stop on Line 1

Overview
- Native name: Tranvía de Tenerife
- Owner: Metropolitano de Tenerife (100% owned by Cabildo de Tenerife)
- Locale: Tenerife, Canary Islands, Spain
- Transit type: Tram (light rail)
- Number of stations: 27 (across two lines)
- Daily ridership: 50,000
- Annual ridership: 14.7 million (2018)

Operation
- Began operation: 2 June 2007
- Operator: Metropolitano de Tenerife

Technical
- System length: 15.1 km (9.4 mi)
- Track gauge: 1,435 mm (4 ft 8 1/2 in) standard gauge
System map
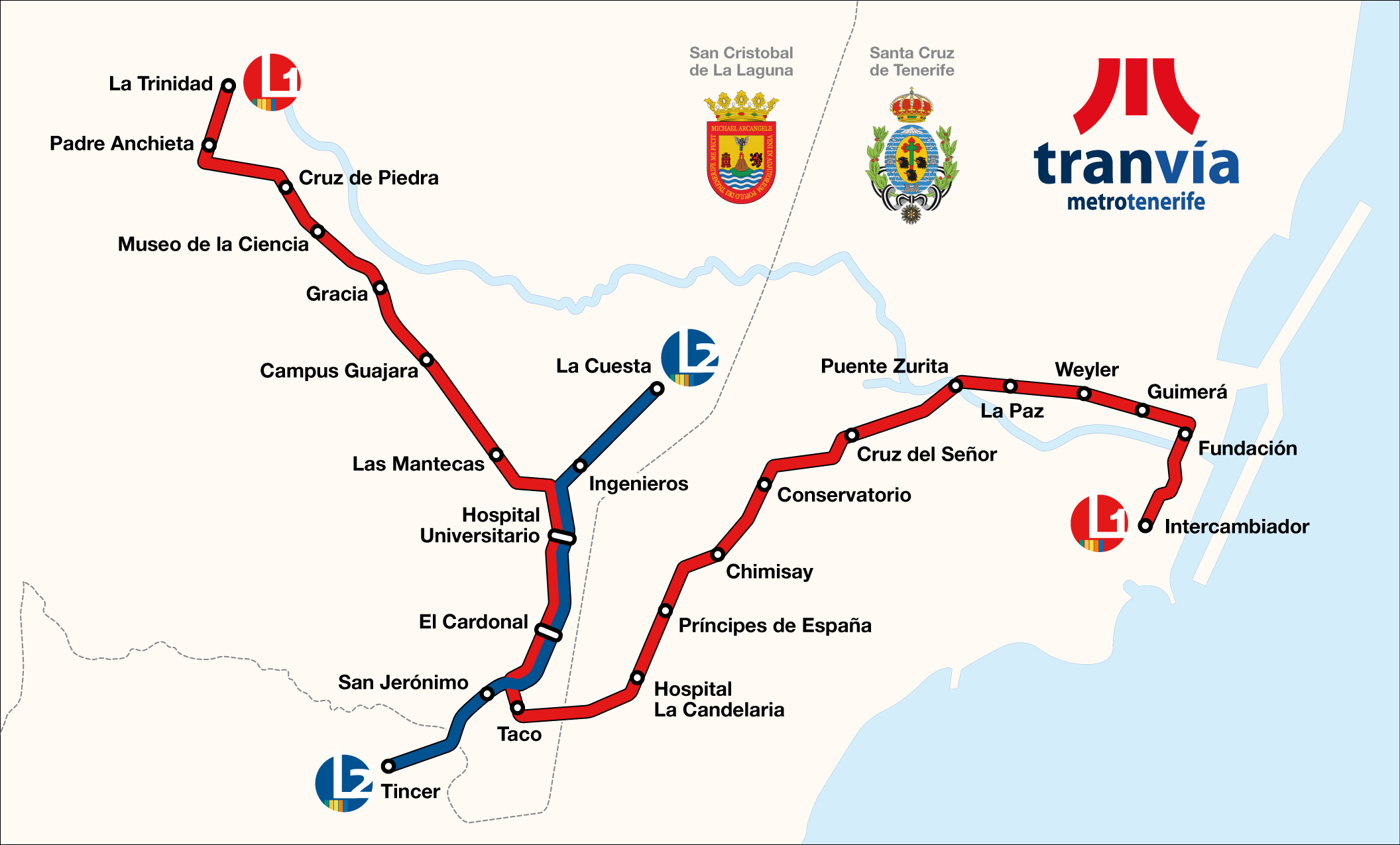

Tenerife Tram (Spanish: Tranvía de Tenerife) is a light rail or tram service located on the island of Tenerife, one of the Canary Islands in Spain. It is operated by Metropolitano de Tenerife, a limited company now 100% owned by Cabildo de Tenerife. Service started on 2 June 2007 over a 12.5-kilometre (7.8 mi) route that linked the Intercambiador in Santa Cruz de Tenerife with Avenida de la Trinidad in La Laguna. A second line between La Cuesta and Tíncer opened in 2009 (connecting with Line 1 at Hospital Universitario and El Cardonal). It is the only existing tramway or train in the Canary Islands.

== History ==
A streetcar (tram) system had once existed on Tenerife. It was inaugurated on 7 April 1901, with a service that began in Santa Cruz and finished in La Laguna. It was designed by the Spanish engineer and military man Julio Cervera Baviera. In 1904 the line was extended to Tacoronte. In 1927 the Cabildo of Tenerife took control of the operating company due to economic problems. The tram car lines remained functional until 1951, when, due to a series of problems and accidents, and increased competition with the car and bus (on Tenerife, buses are called guaguas), the service was discontinued.

== Construction ==
After much political debate on investment in trams versus buses, approval was eventually given to the €306 million budget.

Construction started in 2004, and by December 2005 sufficient track existed for train supplier Alstom to start test-running on a 600-metre (2,000 ft) section of track between the systems train depot and the Hospital Universitario de Canarias in La Cuesta. The last of the 20 tram units were handed over in August 2006.

The construction phase officially ended on 2 June 2007 with the opening day tram on Line 1. Free service was provided to all passengers from that weekend all the way through to the following Sunday, before tariffs and tickets were introduced.

== Rolling stock ==
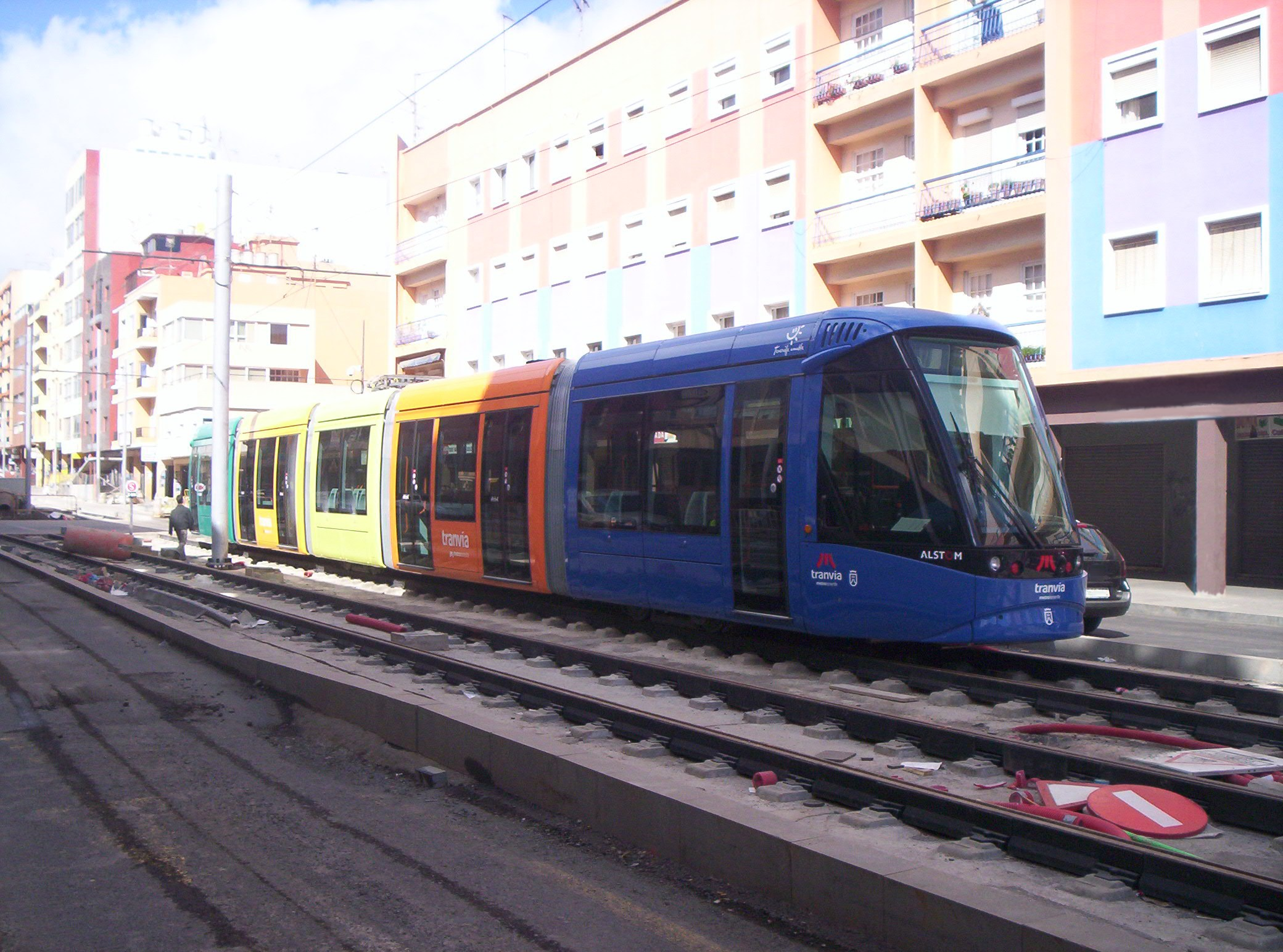
A tramcar in La Laguna during a test run (2007)

The light rail (tram) rolling stock is entirely made up of the Citadis 302 model, 100% low floor from Alstom, as already used on the Madrid Light Metro, the Casablanca Tramway, the Parla Tram, and lines Trambaix and Trambesòs in Barcelona. These low-floor and floor lighted trams have a maximum speed of 70 kilometres per hour (43 mph), and are powered through a 750 V DC catenary. The trams are each made up of five carriages, two driving carriages sandwiching three passenger/power carriages.

== Operations ==
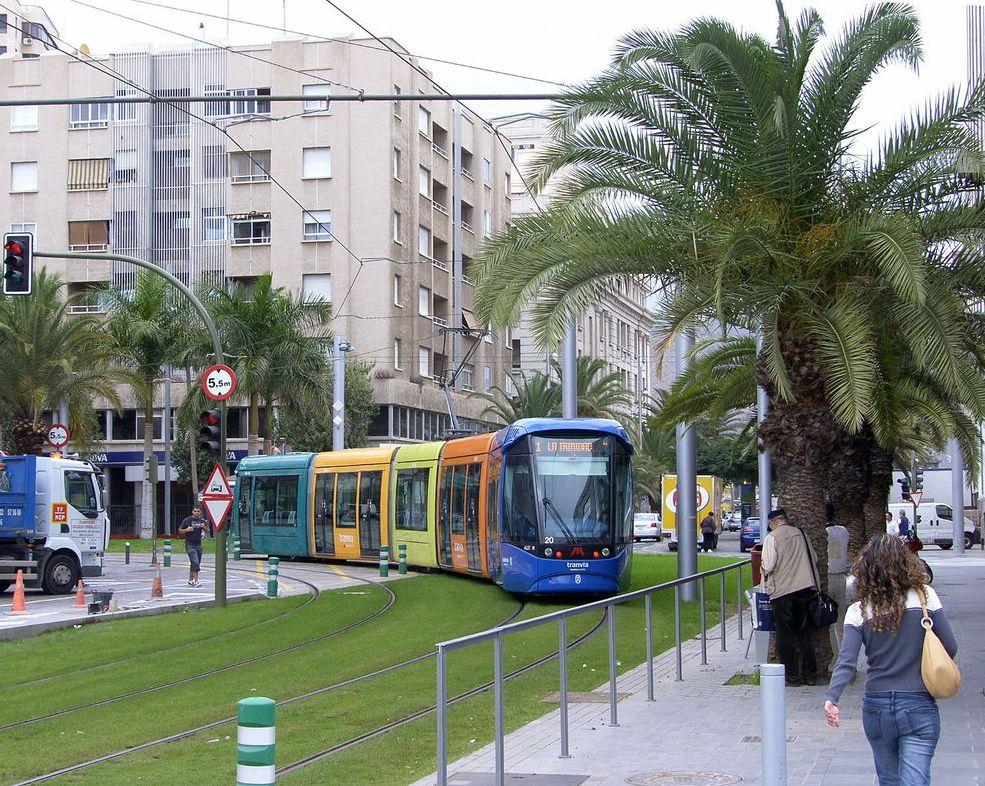
Where it runs at street level the Tranvía de Tenerife is separated from other traffic

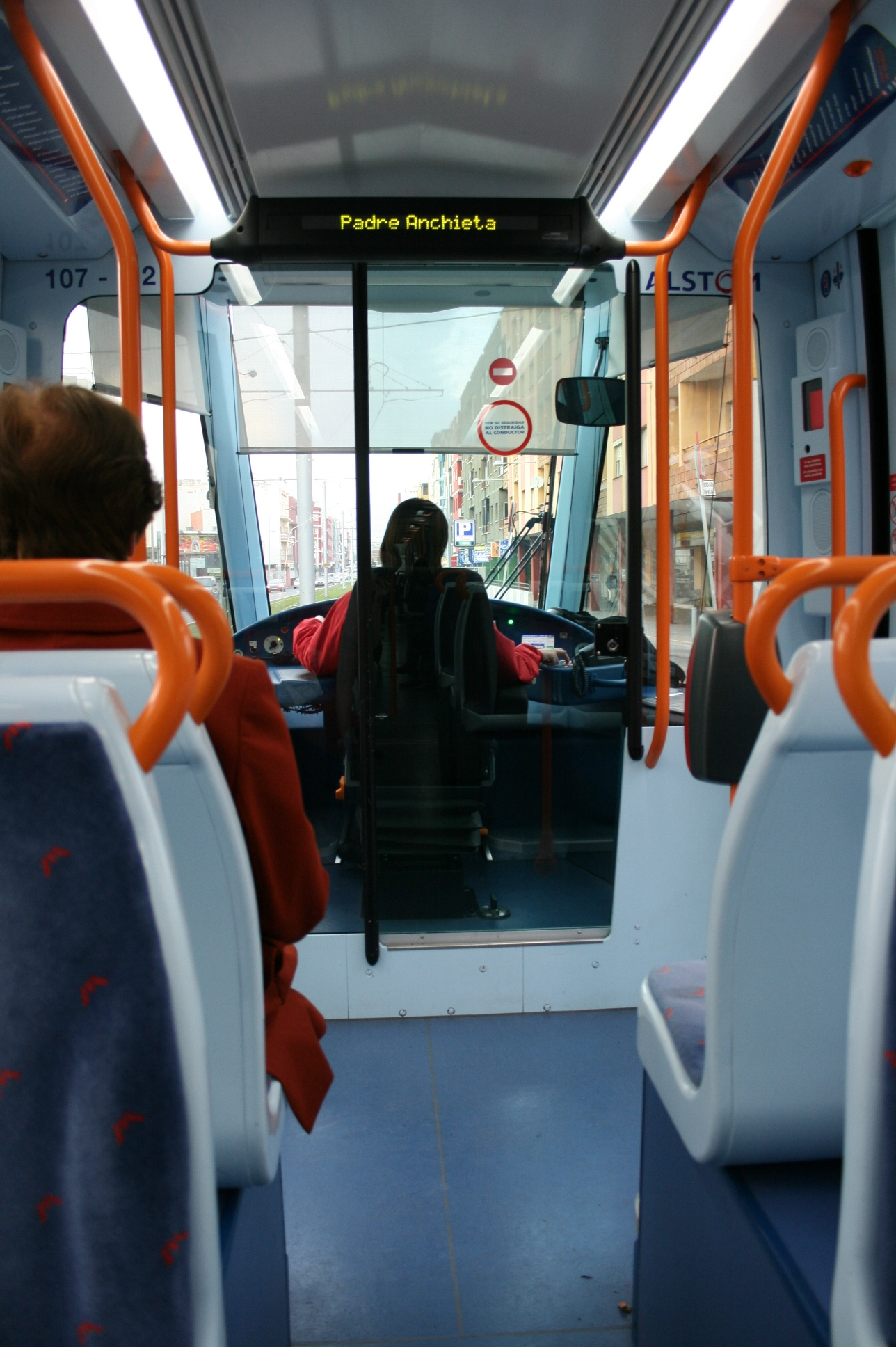
Inside a typical tramcar, looking forward towards the driver

=== Line 1 ===
Line 1 (SC Interchange - Trinidad) consists of 21 stops along a route of 12.5 kilometres (7.8 mi), transporting an average of 46,000 people per day in the metropolitan area. Each of the 20 trams is capable to transport 200 passengers (60 seated) at a maximum speed of 70 kilometres per hour (43 mph), though for safety they only reach a maximum speed of 50 kilometres per hour (31 mph) on this line.

Line 1
Stop	Image	Líne/s	Notes
Intercambiador			Also known as the Tenerife Transport Exchange. For Santa Cruz and Auditorio de Tenerife
Fundación			
Teatro Guimerá			
Weyler			
La Paz			
Puente Zurita			
Cruz del Señor			
Conservatorio			
Chimisay			
Príncipes de España			
Hospital La Candelaria			
Taco			---
El Cardonal			
Hospital Universitario			
Las Mantecas			
Campus Guajara			
Gracia			
Museo de la Ciencia			
Cruz de Piedra			
Padre Anchieta			
Trinidad			For San Cristóbal de La Laguna

In January 2011 the Padre Anchieta stop was moved from its initial location in the Trinity Avenue, to its current location next to the La Laguna bus interchange at a cost of €900,000.

Plans are in place to lengthen the line with four additional stops, including Tenerife North Airport. There would also be new stations in San Antonio, San Lazaro (Park and Ride) and Los Rodeos-TFN.

=== Line 2 ===
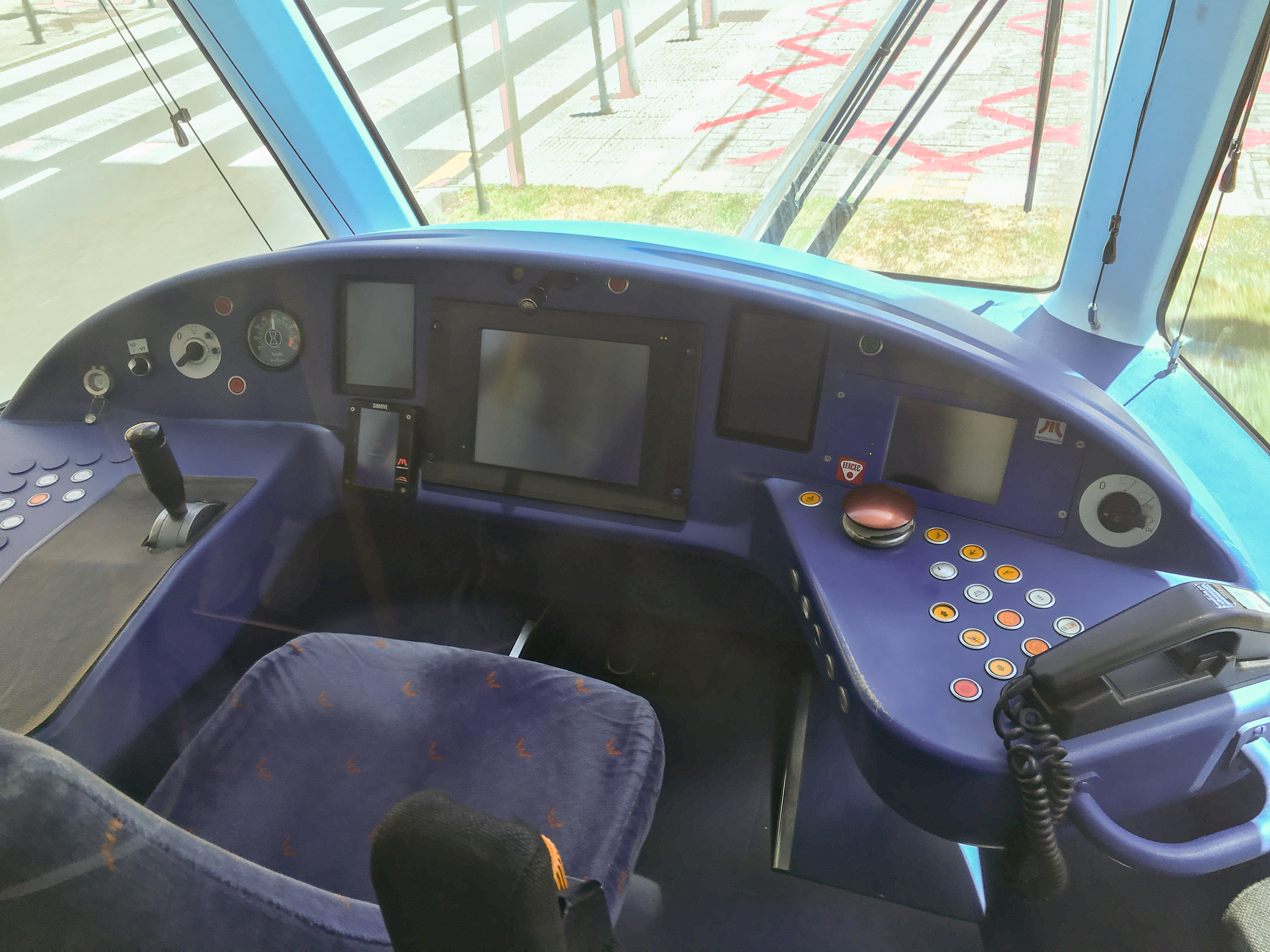
The control area of one of the trams

Line 2 opened on 30 May 2009, running from La Cuesta to Tíncer, sharing stops at University Hospital and El Cardonal with Line 1. It is planned to extend the line by 2.5 km (1.6 mi) from Tincer to La Gallega (district of the District southwest of Santa Cruz) to give coverage to the greater population.

Line 2
Stop	Image	Líne/s	Notes
La Cuesta			
Ingenieros			
Hospital Universitario			
El Cardonal			
San Jerónimo			
Tíncer			

=== Line 3 ===
A third line is expected to be built, proposed to run along the coast of the capital of Tenerife, and not as speculated through the center of the city of Santa Cruz.

== Tariffs ==
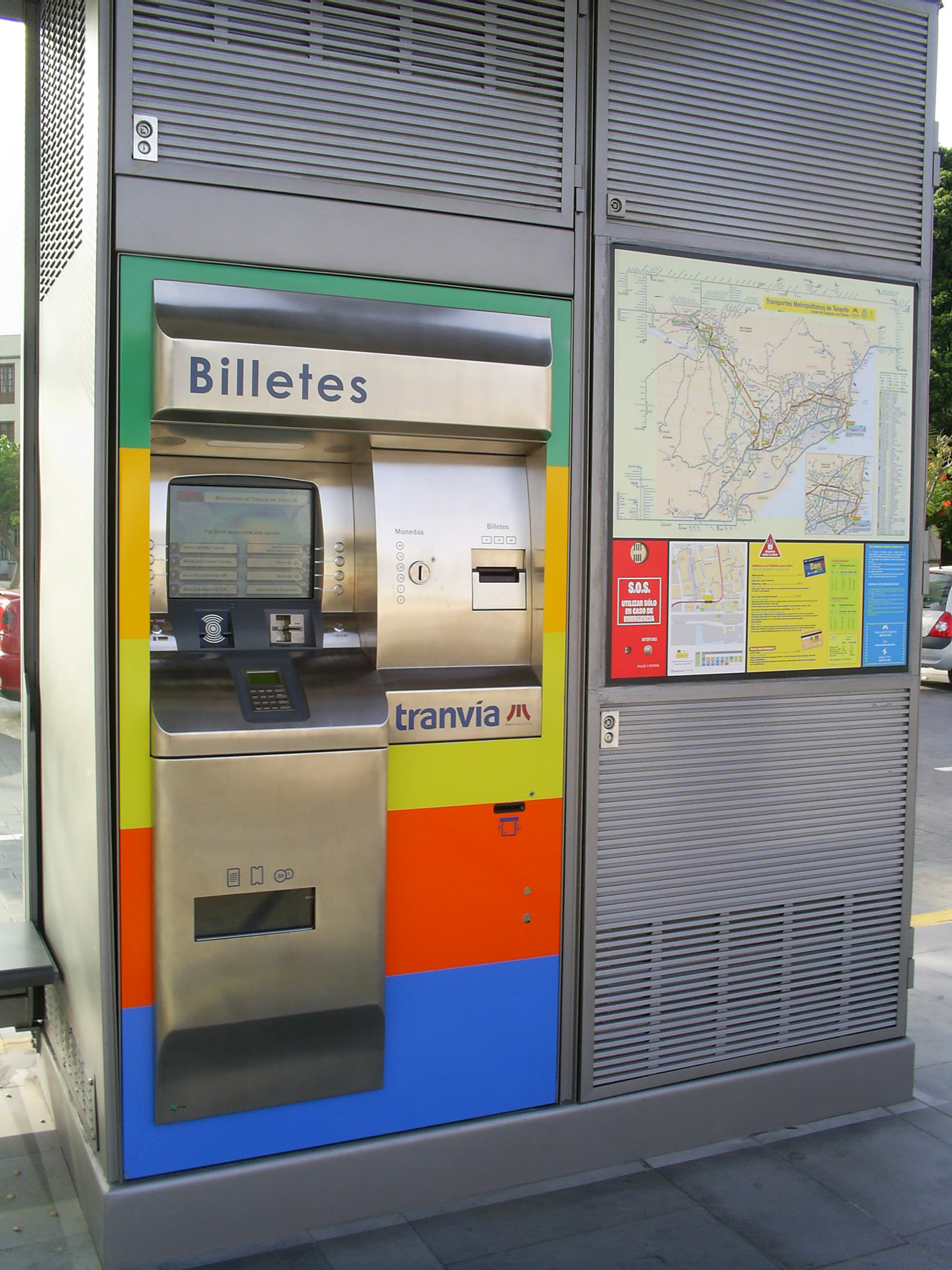
Ticket machine

In agreement between Cabildo de Tenerife, TITSA and MTSA, tram and bus systems are a fully integrated transport system, with journeys costing exactly the same, whichever system is chosen.

Ticket (descriptions/prices as of 1 Aug 2012)	Cost	Price/journey
Single ticket (1 trip)	€1,35	
"Ida y vuelta" (return) ticket (2 trips)	€2,50	
BonoVía €15	€15,00	€1,05
BonoVía €30	€30,00	€1,05
BonoVía €15 (Student concession)	€15,00	€0,80
Monthly pass (unlimited rides in the Metropolitan Area)	€48,00	--
Transfer over Metropolitan tram lines (over 1 hour)	€0,35	--
Higher, a concession ticket for those on lower incomes, pensioners, or the disabled	€6,50	€0,10
Large family/party bonus (Groups of 6 or more)	€40,00	€0,80
Ultimo Dia (Day Ticket)	€4,50	

== See also ==
- Tren del Sur (Tenerife)
- Tren de Gran Canaria
- Rail transport in Spain
