= Autoridad Única del Transporte de Gran Canaria =

Local transport authority body responsible for the transport system in Gran Canaria

- Gran Canaria in the Canary Islands
- Abbreviation: TGC
- Formation: 10 May 1999
- Type: Transport authority
- Headquarters: Calle Venegas 45, Piso 6ª y 7ª, 35003 Las Palmas de Gran Canaria
- Region served: Gran Canaria
- Website: www.autgc.org

The Autoridad Única del Transporte de Gran Canaria (English: Unified Transport Authority of Gran Canaria, also known as Transporte de Gran Canaria or TGC) is the transport authority on Gran Canaria in the Canary Islands. It is responsible for the management and coordination of public transport across the island. TGC is owned by the Cabildo de Gran Canaria and operates in conjunction with the municipalities of Gran Canaria, including the municipal councils of Las Palmas de Gran Canaria and Santa Lucía de Tirajana.

TGC operates the San Telmo bus station and the Santa Catalina Interchange in Las Palmas, as well as a number of transport interchanges around the island including Faro de Maspalomas and Galdar bus stations.

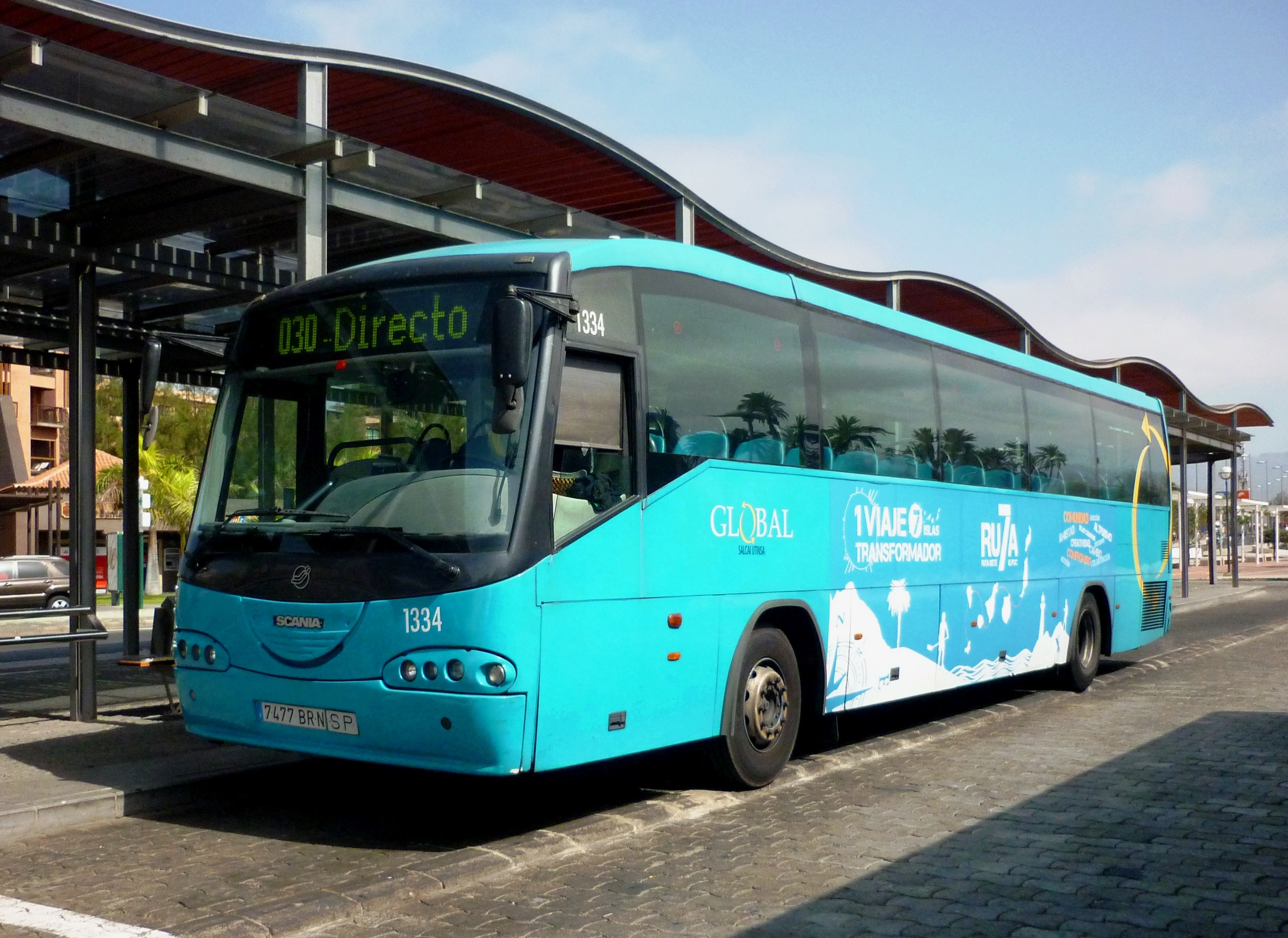
A Global bus at Faro de Maspalomas bus station

Public transport around Gran Canaria is provided by an extensive bus network, operated by the Global bus company. Bus tickets may be purchased with cash, and AUTGC also operates a contactless electronic ticket called the TransGC Card, which is valid across the whole network.

Together with the Cabildo Insular, TGC has set up a public company called Ferrocarriles de Gran Canaria to manage a project to build a railway line between Las Palmas, Gran Canaria Airport and Maspalomas. The proposed Tren de Gran Canaria has not received funding or central governmental approval.
