= Trencadís =

Mosaic made from tile shards

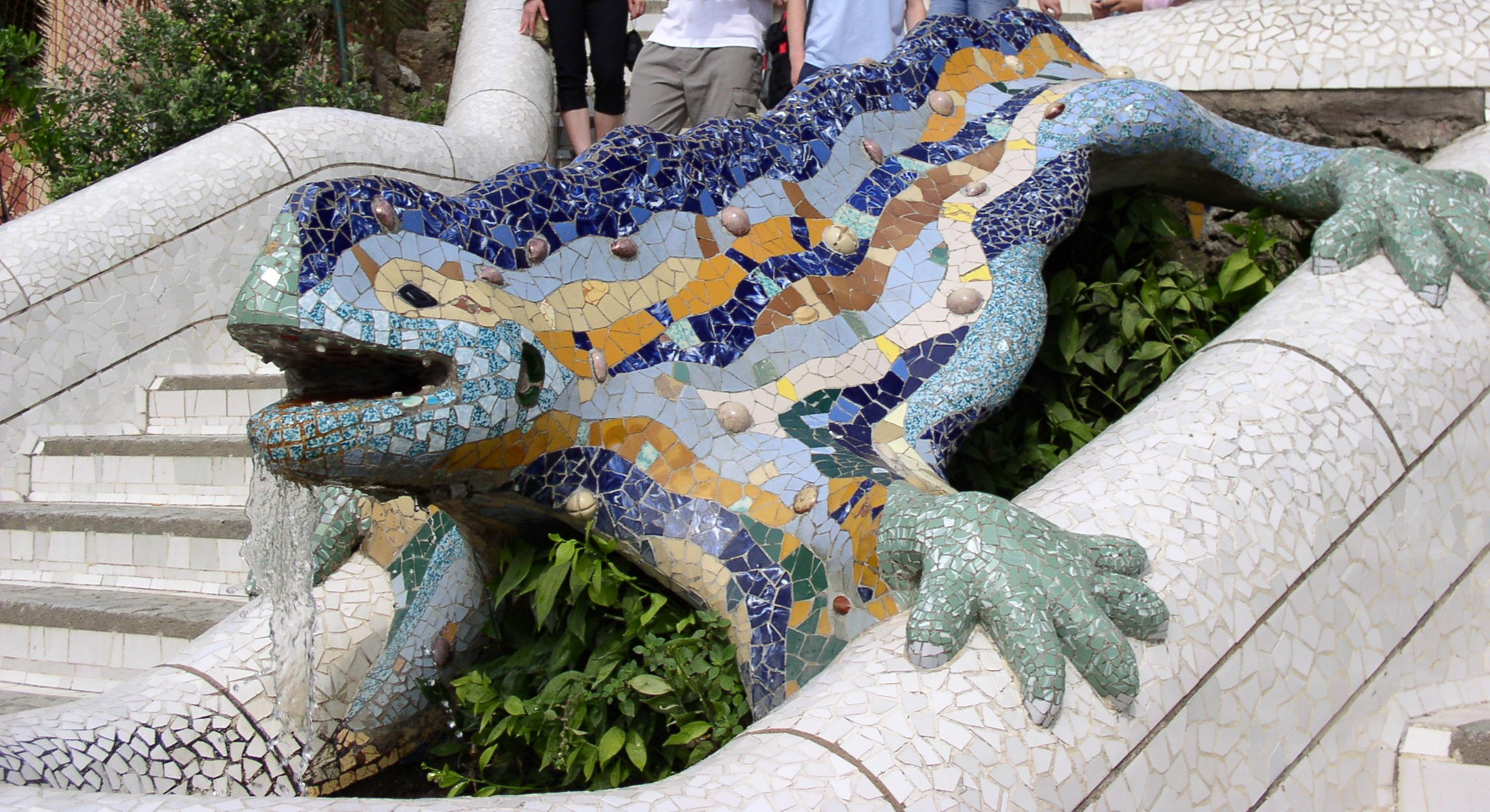
Dragon with trencadís at the entrance of Parc Güell overlooking Barcelona.

Trencadís (Catalan pronunciation: [tɾəŋkəˈðis]), also known as pique assiette, broken tile mosaics, bits and pieces, memoryware, and shardware, is a type of mosaic made from cemented-together tile shards and broken chinaware. It is commonly associated with Antoni Gaudí (see below). Glazed china and ceramics tend to be preferred, glass is sometimes mixed in as well, as are other small materials like buttons and shells. Artists working in this form may create random designs, pictorial scenes, geometric patterns, or a hybrid of any of these.

Although as a folk art the method itself may be centuries old, the two most commonly used terms are both of modern origin. Trencadís, a Catalan term that means 'broken up', and by extension, 'broken up tiles', is the name for this method as it was revived in early 20th century Catalan Modernisme, while pique assiette is a more general name for the technique that comes from the French language. In French, pique assiette ('plate thief') is a term for a scrounger or sponger, and thus, as a name for this mosaic technique, it refers to the recycled or 'scrounged' nature of the materials.

== Technique ==
Traditional mosaics, such as classical Roman floors, are made up of individual tesserae, usually small cubes that are uniformly shaped and designed for their intended use. Trencadís differs in that the tesserae are nonuniform pieces broken from tiles and chinaware originally made for other uses. Trencadís is thus a form of bricolage, found object art, or recycled art.

There are two main methods for trencadís. In the first, an initial design is drawn up and the ceramic fragments are carefully fitted into the design; in this case, the mosaic is only cemented together once all of the fragments have been placed. Alternatively, an artist may spontaneously arrange fragments without a prior design; here the success of the finished work depends greatly on their improvisation skills.

== Notable artists and works ==
=== Antoni Gaudí and Josep Maria Jujol ===
The Catalan modernist architects Antoni Gaudí and Josep Maria Jujol used trencadís in many projects, among which Barcelona's Parc Güell (1900–1914) is probably the most famous. Gaudí's first use of this technique was at the Güell Pavilions, where the sinuous architecture forced him to break the tiles in order to cover the curved surfaces.

Gaudí tended to create patterns with his trencadís work, and he leaned towards brightly colored glazed ceramic shards. He often used discarded pieces of ceramic tile collected from the factory Pujol i Bausis located in Esplugues de Llobregat, as well as pieces of white ceramic from broken cups and plates discarded by other Spanish manufacturers.

=== Demetrio Ribes ===
The Valencian architect Demetrio Ribes used trencadís extensively for decoration in the hall of Valencia North Station in 1907.

=== Raymond Edouard Isidore ===
In France, the term pique assiette is most closely associated with Raymond Edouard Isidore (1900–1964) a French graveyard sweeper and folk artist. Starting in the late 1930s, he spent 30 years covering both the inside and outside of his house as well as his furniture and his garden walls with mosaics. He found his materials in the surrounding fields and quarries, in the public dump, and at auctions. This habit of scavenging earned him the nickname "pique assiette" later shortened to "picassiette".

Isidore, a very religious man, created many of his mosaic scenes with Christian personages and symbols. He also built a "sweeper's throne" and a "sweeper's tomb" covered in pique assiette. As the mosaics expanded, the project became more widely known, and in 1954, Pablo Picasso visited Isidore's house. Today, the house is a tourist attraction near Chartres known as "Maison Picassiette".

=== Watts Towers ===
The Watts Towers in Los Angeles were built over a period of 30 years by Simon Rodia, a construction worker and tile mason. Begun in 1921, the 17 interconnected towers were decorated with fragments of porcelain, tile, glass, seashells and other found objects. Rodia built them without a premade plan, using damaged pieces from local tile companies and materials scavenged by neighborhood children.

=== Bridge of the Dragon ===
A contemporary example is the Bridge of the Dragon, which crosses the Guadaíra River at Alcalá de Guadaíra. The bridge's support structure emulates a dragon's body and is covered in trencadís. Designed by engineer José Luis Manzanares, it was directly inspired by Gaudí's dragon fountain in Parc Güell.

=== Memory jugs ===
A related form is the memory jug, an American folk art form that memorializes the dead. The memory jug is a vessel with a mosaic-like surface decoration of glass and ceramic shards, seashells, trinkets, coins and other small objects, especially objects associated with a specific dead person. Most known examples date back no further than the early 20th century.

== Gallery ==
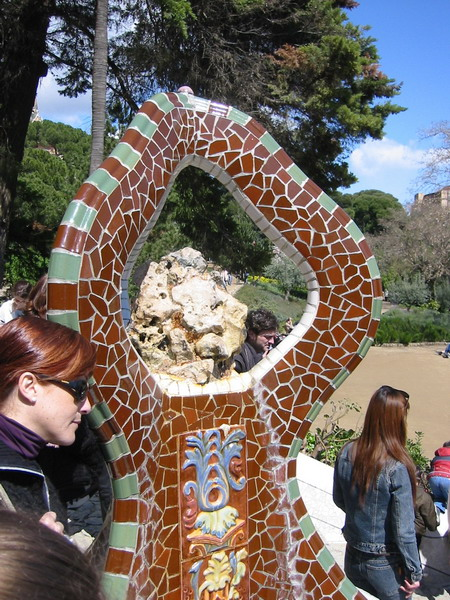
A figure in Park Güell

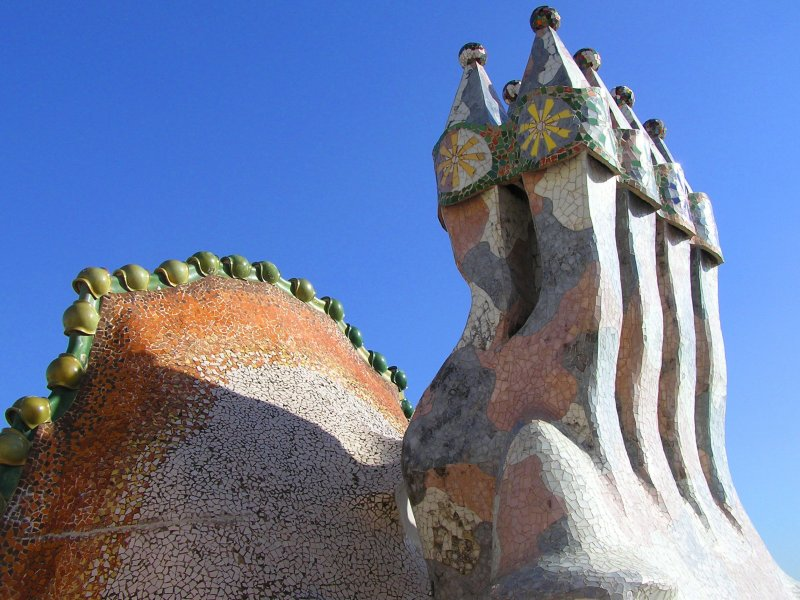
Casa Batlló roof

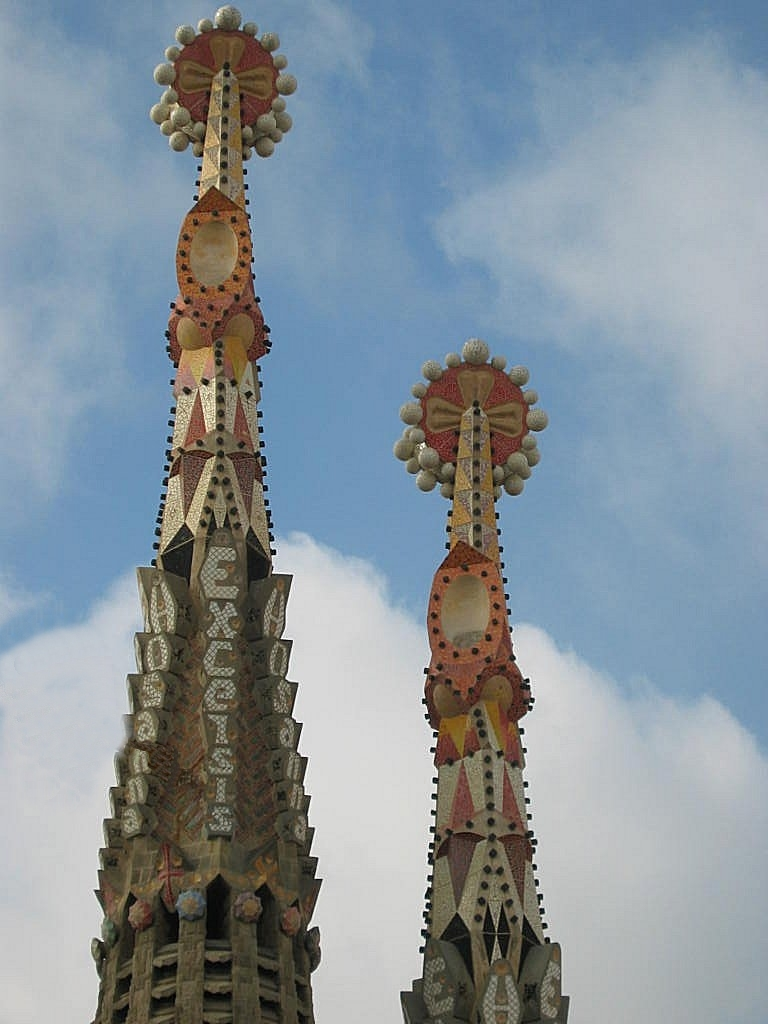
Sagrada Familia detail

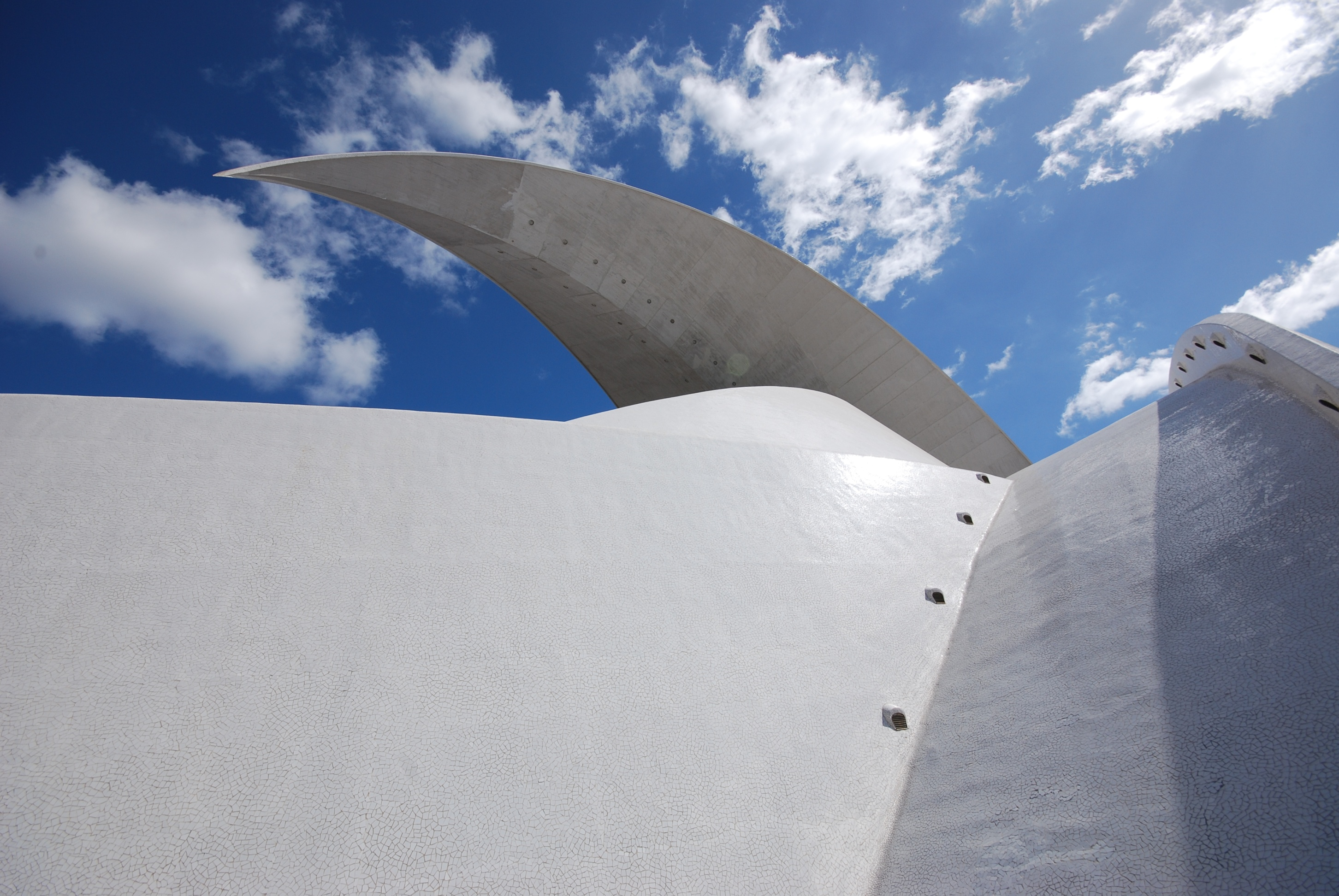
Auditorio de Tenerife

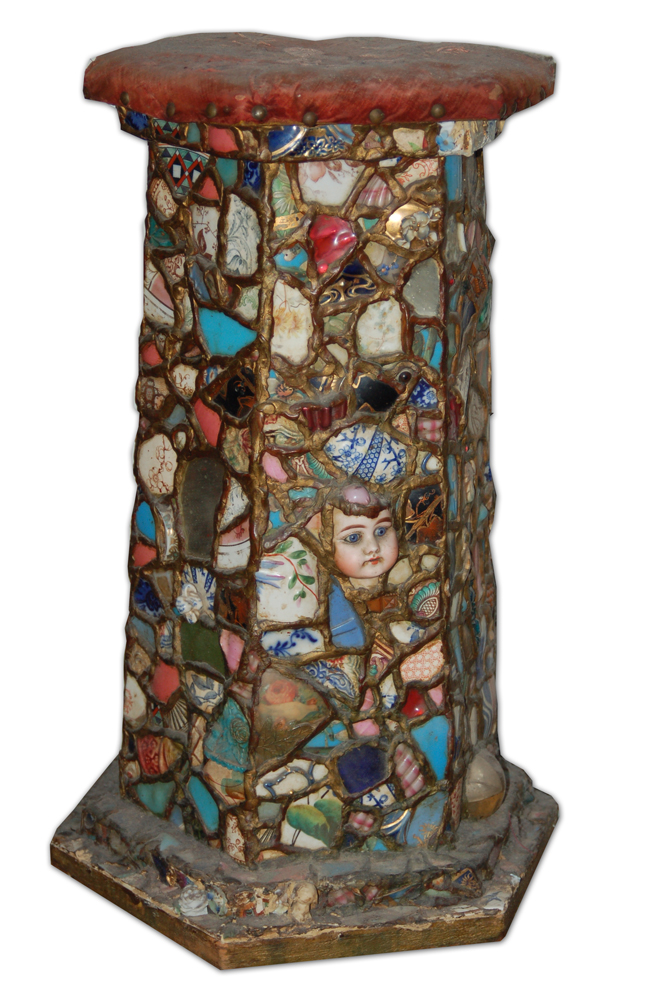
Late 19th or early 20th century puttywork or pique assiette pedestal
