= Memory jug =

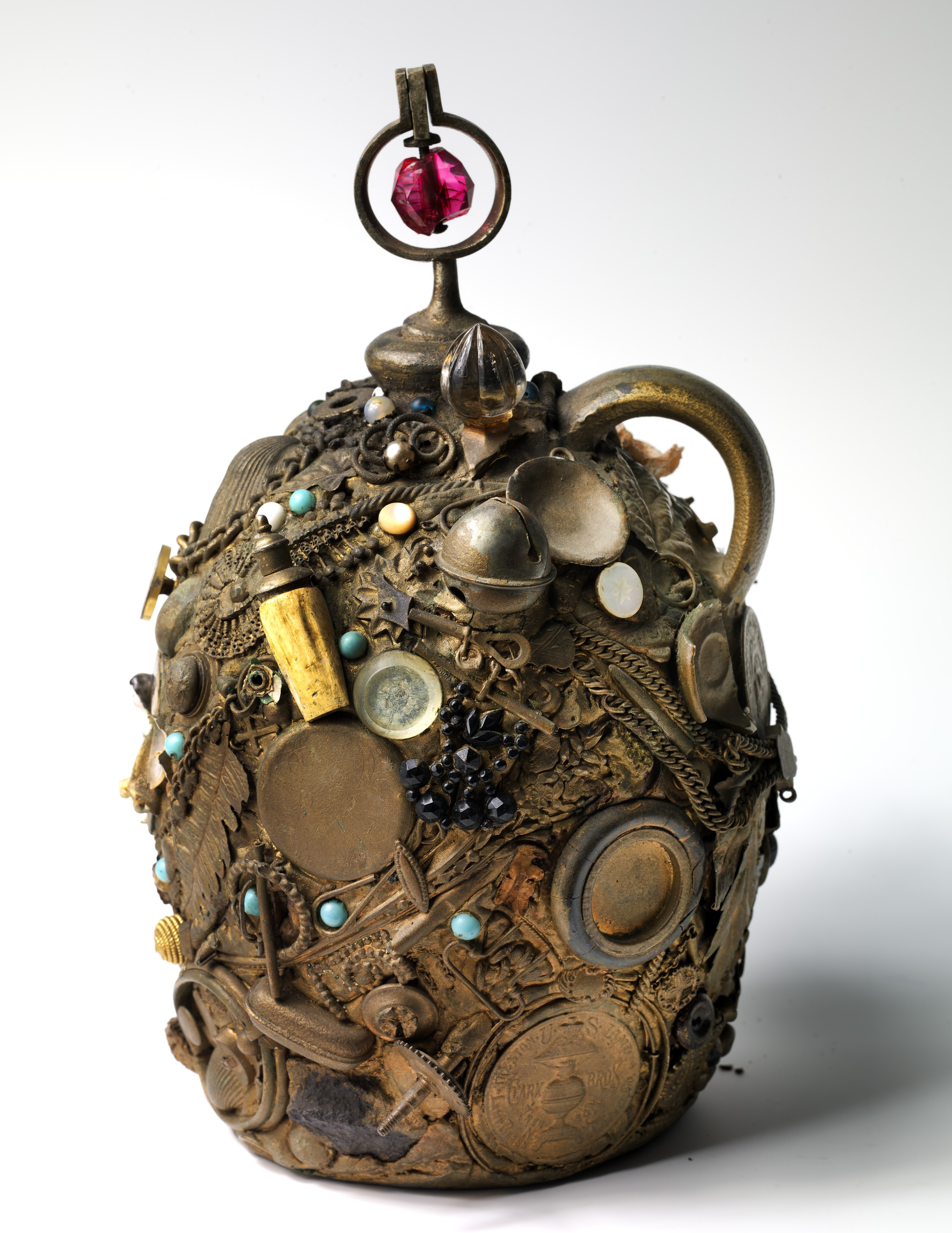
Memory Jug with Finial, in the collection of the Smithsonian American Art Museum

A memory jug is an African American folk art form that memorializes the dead. It is a general term for a vessel whose surface is adorned with an assortment of broken china, glass shards, and small objects, especially items associated with a dead person. They are also called forget-me-not jugs, mourning jugs, memory vessels, spirit jars, whatnot jars, ugly jugs, and whimsy jars.

== History and technique ==
A memory jug may be any kind of vessel but is most usually a jug or vase. Items used to cover the surface range from shards of china, glass, and mirror to shells, beads, buttons, coins, medals, keys, jewelry, toys, watches, and other small objects. These are adhered to the surface using some kind of adhesive, typically putty or cement. The final piece may also be overpainted to create a more uniform surface. Memory jugs are closely related to the broken-china mosaic form known as trencadís that began to appear in the early 20th century.

Most of the existing memory jugs date back no further than the early 20th century, and the makers of most are unknown. Scholars disagree about the origins of memory jugs, with some holding that they were intended as personal memorials, some that they were intended as grave markers, and some that they originated as a hobby unconnected with memorialization.

Memory jugs have sometimes been found on African-American graves in the South, and some scholars think that their form was influenced by the Bakongo culture of Central Africa as it was brought to America by slaves. In Bakongo culture, there is a belief that people are connected to the spirit world by way of water, and consequently graves are often decorated with containers holding water, such as jugs, vases, or shells, as a way to help a dead person's spirit through to the afterlife. In addition, personal possessions are often broken to help release the individual's spirit. The memory jug might thus have originated by combining these traditions into a new kind of memorial.
