= Auditorio de Tenerife =

Auditorium in Santa Cruz de Tenerife, Spain

Coordinates: 28.456075°N 16.251281°W

Auditorio de Tenerife "Adán Martín"

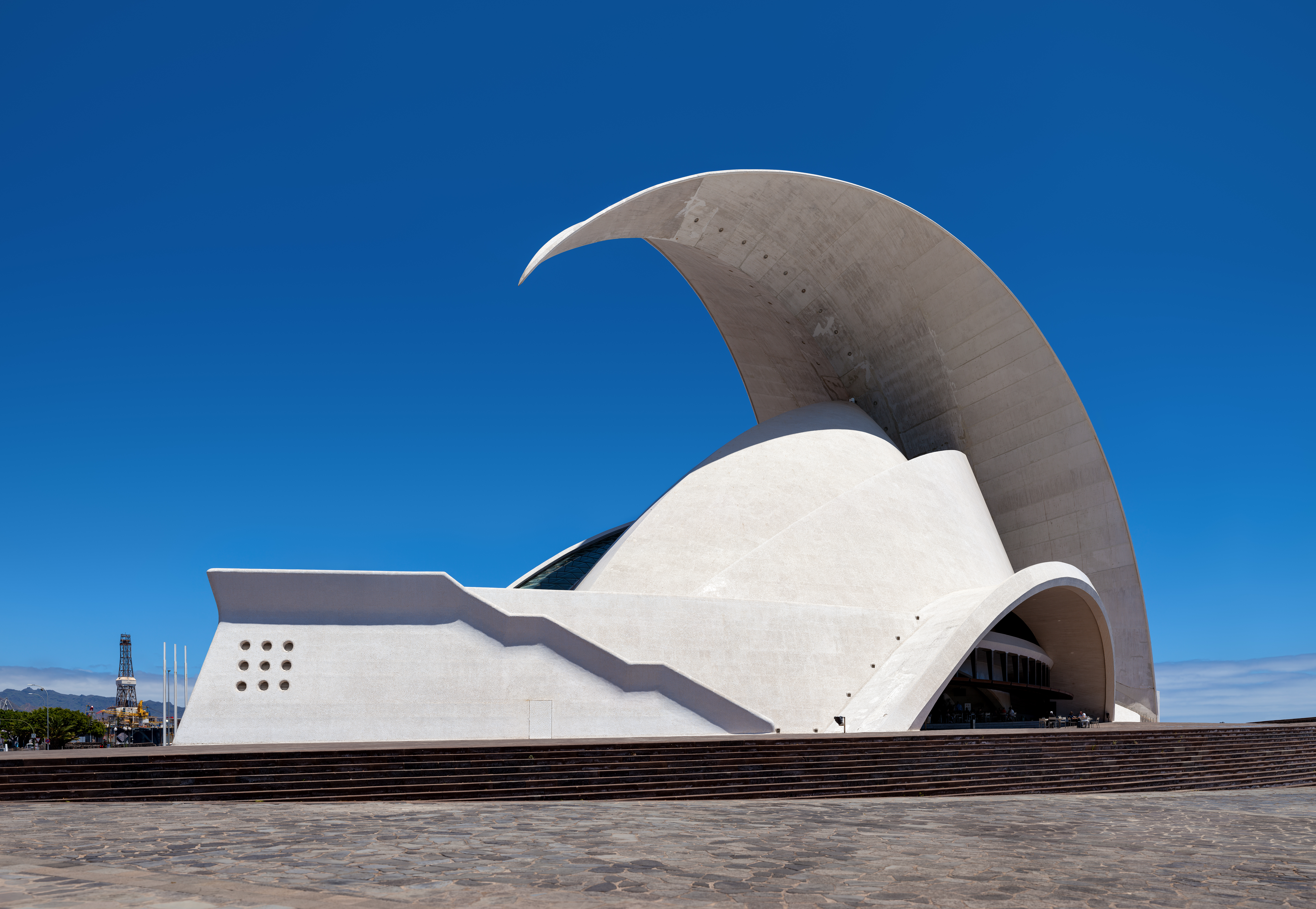

General information
- Type: Arts complex
- Architectural style: Expressionist
- Location: Santa Cruz de Tenerife, Spain
- Completed: 2003
- Opened: September 26, 2003

Technical details
- Structural system: Concrete frame & precast concrete ribbed roof

Design and construction
- Architect: Santiago Calatrava

The Auditorio de Tenerife "Adán Martín" (commonly referred to as the Auditorio de Tenerife) is an auditorium in Santa Cruz de Tenerife, Canary Islands, Spain. Designed by architect Santiago Calatrava, it is located on the Avenue of the Constitution in the Canarian capital, and next to the Atlantic Ocean in the southern part of Port of Santa Cruz de Tenerife. Construction began in 1997 and was completed in 2003. The auditorium was inaugurated on 26 September of that year in the presence of Felipe, Prince of Asturias, and was later visited by former U.S. President Bill Clinton. The building is framed within the tenets of late-modern architecture of the late 20th century.

The majestic profile of the auditorium has become an architectural symbol of the city of Santa Cruz de Tenerife, the island of Tenerife and the Canary Islands. It is also regarded as the finest contemporary building in the Canary Islands and one of the most emblematic buildings of Spanish architecture. In March 2008, it was included by the post office in a set of six stamps (Correos) depicting the most emblematic works of Spanish architecture. In 2011, the image of the Tenerife Auditorium was included in a series of commemorative coins of 5 euros, which displayed the most emblematic symbols of several Spanish cities. It is one of the major attractions of Tenerife and home to the Orquesta Sinfónica de Tenerife (Tenerife Symphony Orchestra). In addition, the building has become an establishing shot in films, television series or programs set in the city of Santa Cruz and the island of Tenerife.

== History ==
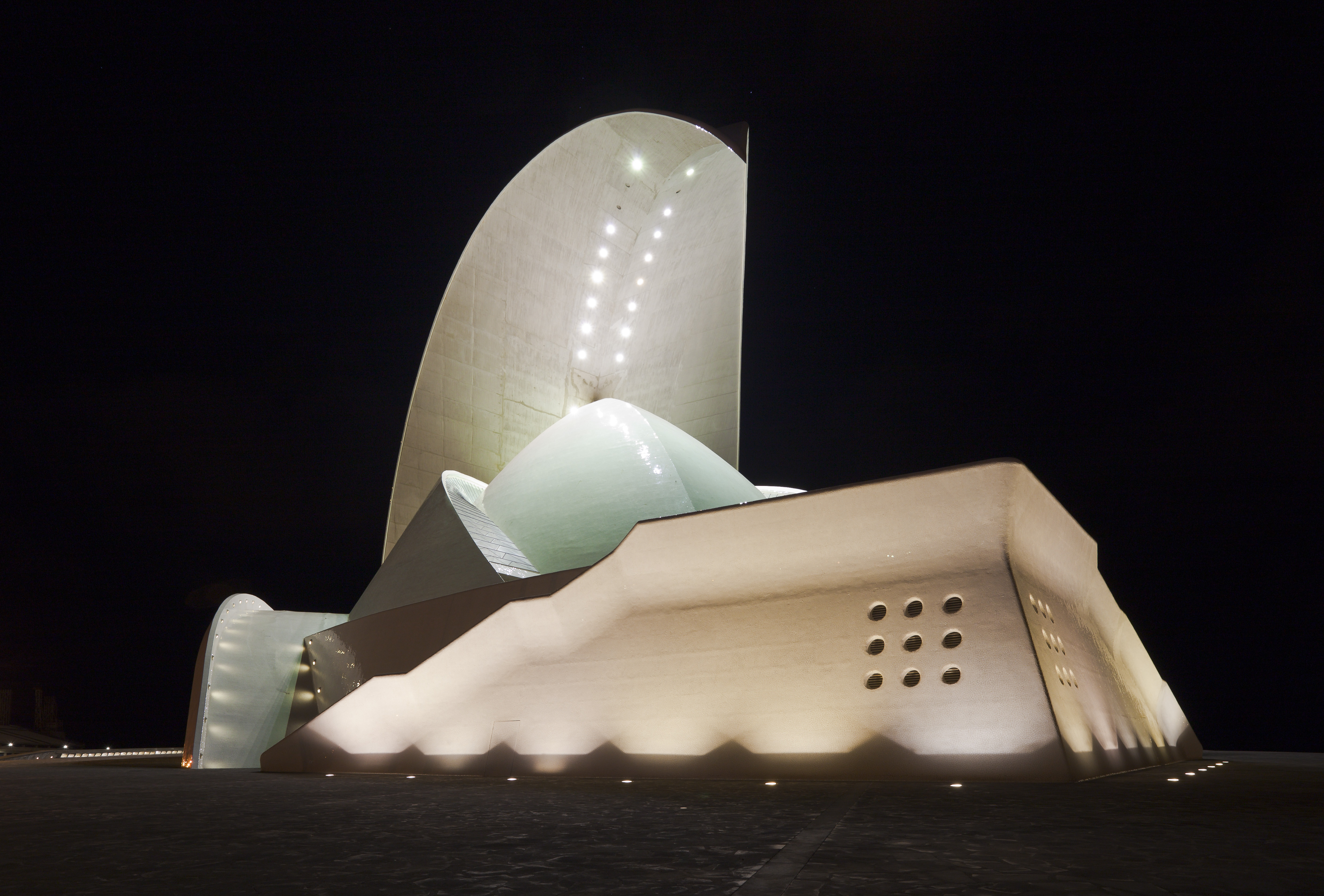
Oblique night view.

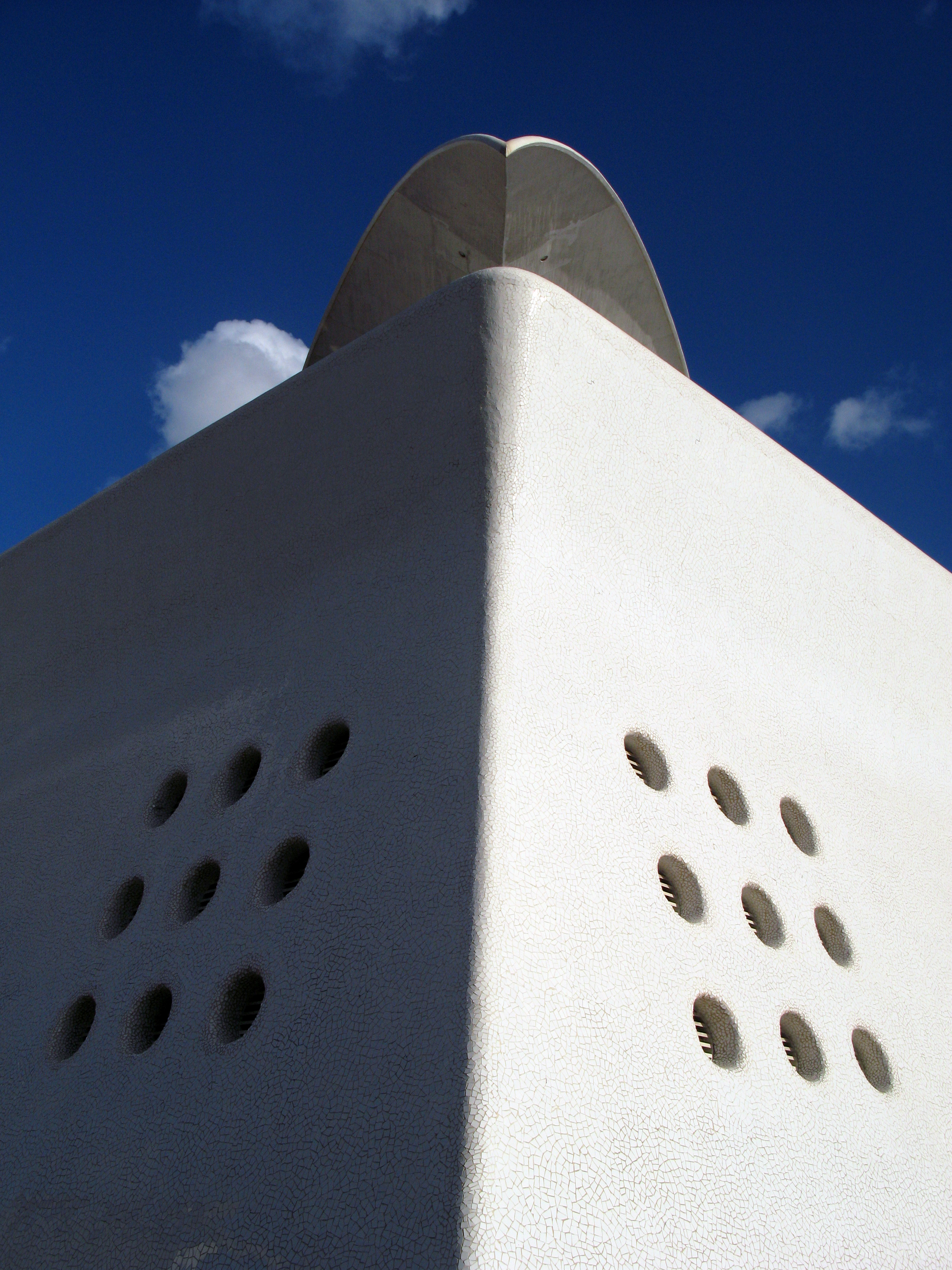
View from below.

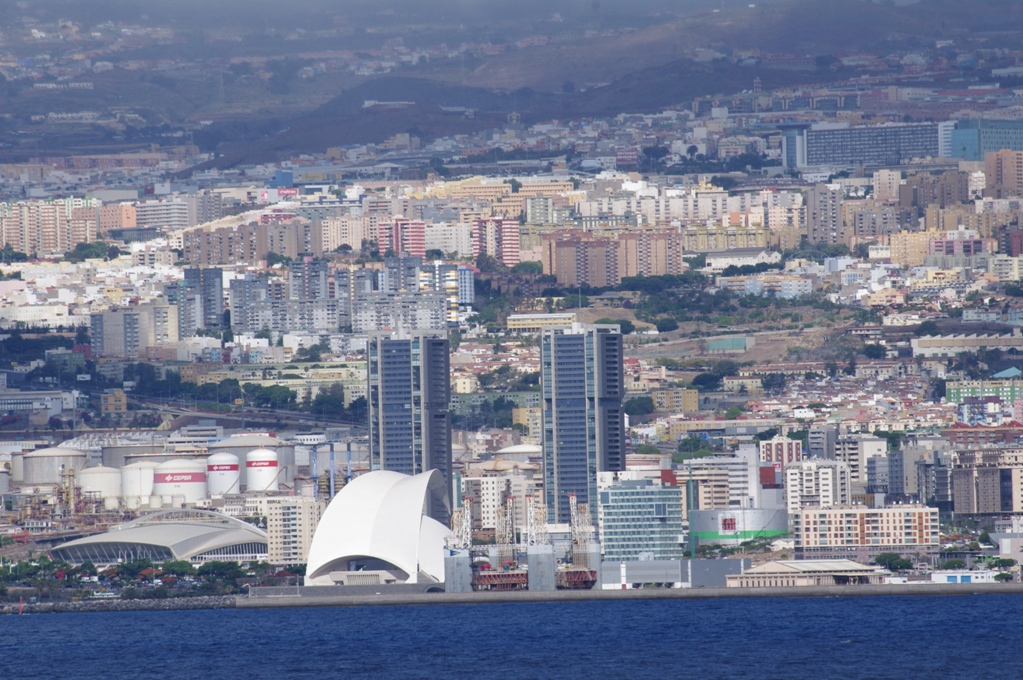
Tenerife Auditorium and Torres de Santa Cruz seen from the sea.

As early as 1970, there was agreement that the creation of an auditorium for the islands should proceed. The location in the El Ramonal was approved in 1977. In 1978 design proposals were solicited for consideration. The project agreed to appoint the architect Antonio Fernández Alba. Later, in 1985, the location of the auditorium was moved to El Chapatal.

In 1987, the final design of Antonio Fernández Alba, with collaboration of Vicente Saavedra and Javier Díaz Llanos was unveiled. However, soon after there was a conceptual shift about the type of building and the government abandoned the project.

In 1989, the government entered into discussions with the architect Santiago Calatrava Valls, who became the project architect. In 1991, Calatrava publicly presented his design. At that time, the building was to be located at the end of Avenida Tres de Mayo.

In 1992 the government created the Commission for Supervision and Control for the construction of the auditorium. In 1996, the Commission changed to a seaside location, the Castle of St John the Baptist.

Groundbreaking and construction finally began in 1997, twenty years after the initial approval, with earthmoving starting at the final location that same year. In 2001, the 17 larger metal panels that form the jacket were installed. In 2002, the concrete and the white exterior trencadís plaster work were completed. The complicated construction required specialized tools. Much of the surface is covered with white trencadís, while colorful trencadís is used as decorative elements in the retaining walls of the plaza on which the building stands.

The original construction budget was 30 million Euros, but 33 years later, the total spend amounted to 72 million Euros.

=== Inauguration ===
The Tenerife Auditorium was officially opened by the Prince of Asturias Felipe de Borbón (son of the King of Spain) on September 26, 2003, accompanied by his mother Queen Sofia. The inaugural concert was Fanfarria Real by Krzysztof Penderecki and was covered by media from around the world, including newspapers such as The New York Times, Financial Times, The Independent, the Paris Le Monde, and Italy's Corriere della Sera, as well as international magazines such as Elle Decoration, Architecture Today and Marie Claire Maison.

=== Bill Clinton's visit ===
The auditorium was visited by former President of the United States Bill Clinton, who visited Tenerife in July 2005 to attend a conference on the role of the island as part of the Tenerife Atlantic Logistics Platform. This was the first visit by a former U.S. president to the Canary Islands.

=== Name change ===
On January 28, 2011 the Cabildo de Tenerife approved the proposal to rename the building "Auditorio de Tenerife Adán Martín" in memory of President of the Canary Islands, Adán Martín Menis, who was the driving force behind the construction of the auditorium in his stage as President of the Cabildo Insular de Tenerife (1987-1999). However, many citizens and media were against the name change. Despite the name change of the auditorium, most of the population continues to call the building just "Auditorio de Tenerife".

== Building ==
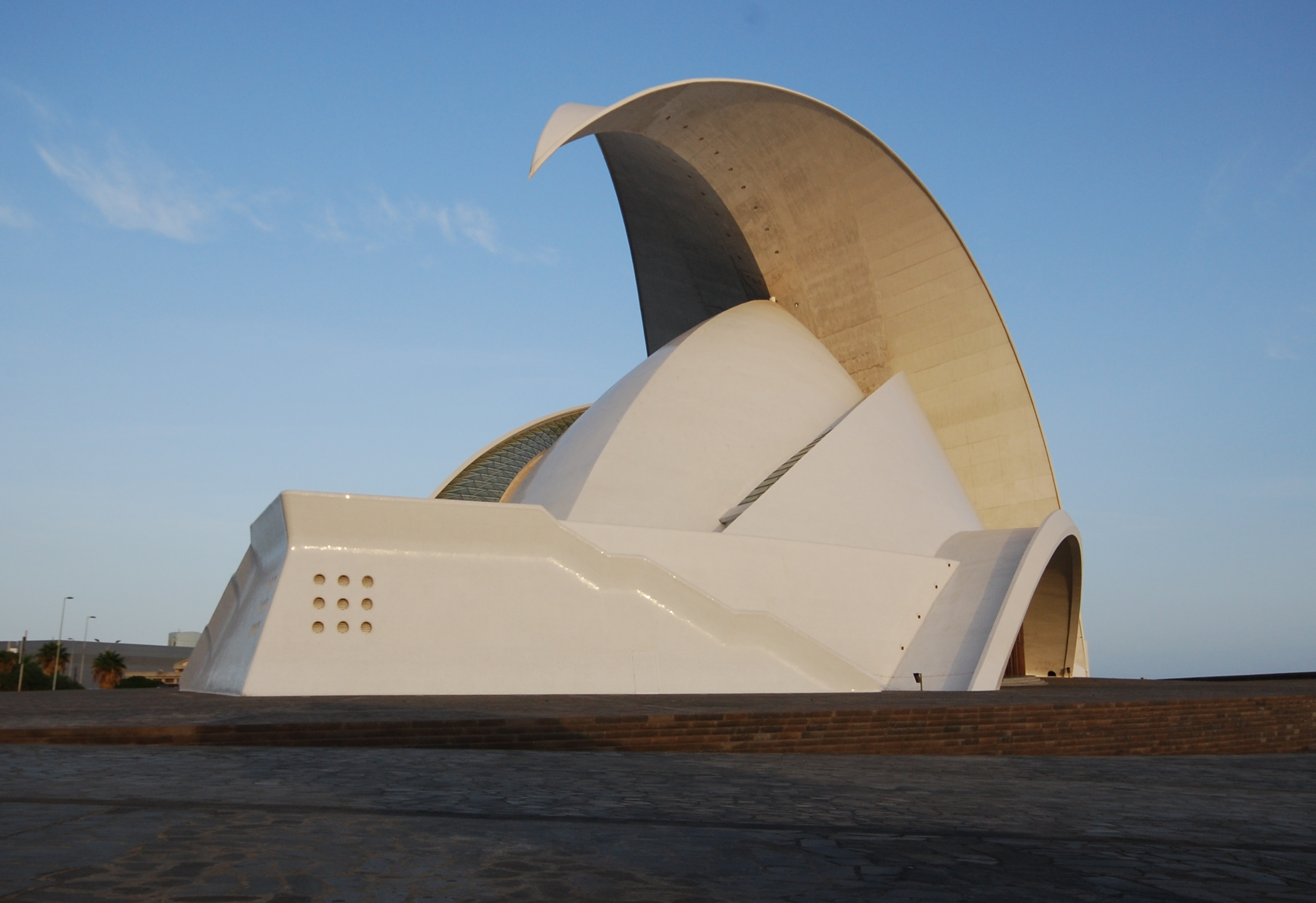
A different view

The Auditorio de Tenerife is situated in a central area of the city of Santa Cruz de Tenerife, near The Avenue of the Constitution, the Parque Marítimo César Manrique and the Port of Santa Cruz de Tenerife. The auditorium is located near the Tenerife Tram station.

Near the auditorium stand the two Torres de Santa Cruz, which are the tallest buildings in the Canary Islands, and the tallest residential building in Spain until 2010. The auditorium and the towers are the most recognizable and most photographed structures in the city. The building stands on a plot of 23,000 m^{2} (250,000 sq ft) of which the auditorium occupies 6,471 m^{2} (69,650 sq ft), divided into two chambers. The main hall or Symphony, crowned by a dome, has 1,616 seats in an amphitheater. Its stage is 16.5 m (54 ft) wide, with a depth of 14 m (46 ft). Organ pipes emerge from both sides of the pit, designed by the world famous virtuoso Jean Guillou and erected by Albert Blancafort (who has also been involved in the construction of organs at the Cathedral of Alcala de Henares and the Auditorio Alfredo Kraus on Gran Canaria). The auditorium differs from traditional designs because it attempts to surround the listener with sound sources.

The chamber hall, with 422 seats, reproduces the symphony hall amphitheater on a smaller scale. In the lobby, accessible from two sides of the building, are the press room, a shop and cafe. The building also has a dozen individual dressing rooms, as well as rooms for hairdressing, makeup, costumes, etc. The exterior has two terraces overlooking the sea.

The building is famous for its great "arc", which marked a first in the history of architecture. The arched roof varies in thickness from 15-20cm. It is the only large arch supported by only two points, while the tip appears to be suspended, defying gravity. The silhouette of the auditorium as seen from the sea evokes the Sydney Opera House in Australia. The term "The Sydney of the Atlantic" has come to refer to the city of Santa Cruz de Tenerife.

=== External spaces ===
- Trade Winds Plaza: 16.289 m^{2} (175.33 sq ft)
- Atlantic Terrace: 400 m^{2} (4,300 sq ft)
- City Terrace: 350 m^{2} (3,800 sq ft)

=== Interior spaces ===
- Symphony Hall
- Chamber Hall
- Hall
- Galleries Port and Castle

=== Lighting ===
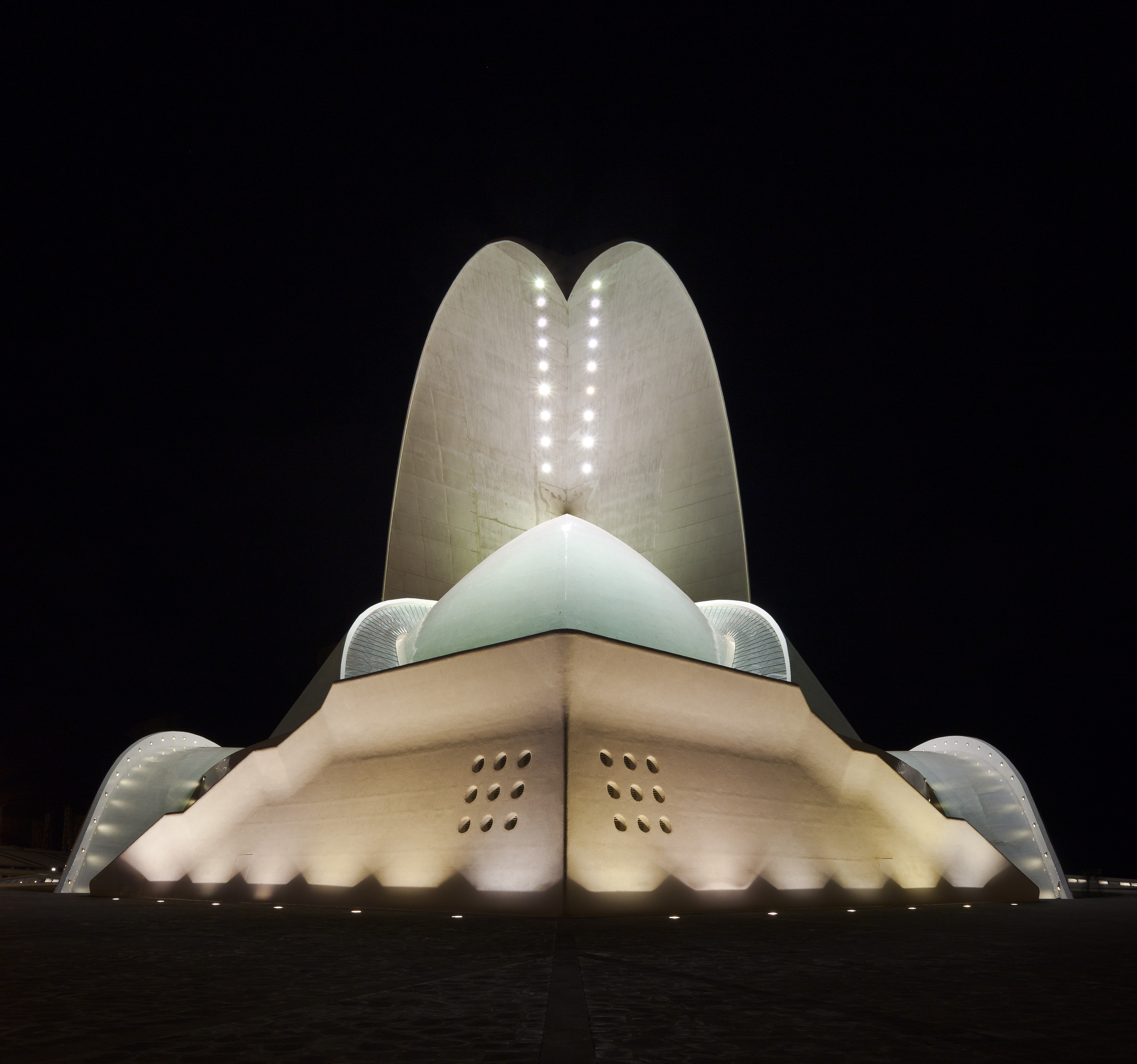
Auditorio de Tenerife by night

The building is normally lit in bright white at night, but more colorful lighting is used on special occasions. For example, on New Year 2007–2008 the auditorium was lit in white and yellow, and a clock was projected onto one wing of the building to mark the hours. In 2008, it was illuminated in green to celebrate 30 years of Transportes interurbanos de Tenerife, S.A. (TITSA).

On World Diabetes Day, the auditorium is illuminated in blue, and special lighting is also employed during the annual Cadena Dial Awards. The auditorium also participates in "Earth Hour," a campaign against climate change in which large buildings "go dark" for an hour to draw awareness to the cause.

Also when a national or international convention is held in the auditorium, are placed on the masts located next to the building, look national flags of the participating countries (e.g. on the occasion of World Port Strategy Forum), also placed banners with logo of the companies sponsoring these forums.

Some exterior lighting fixtures are taped to the wall.

== Damage ==
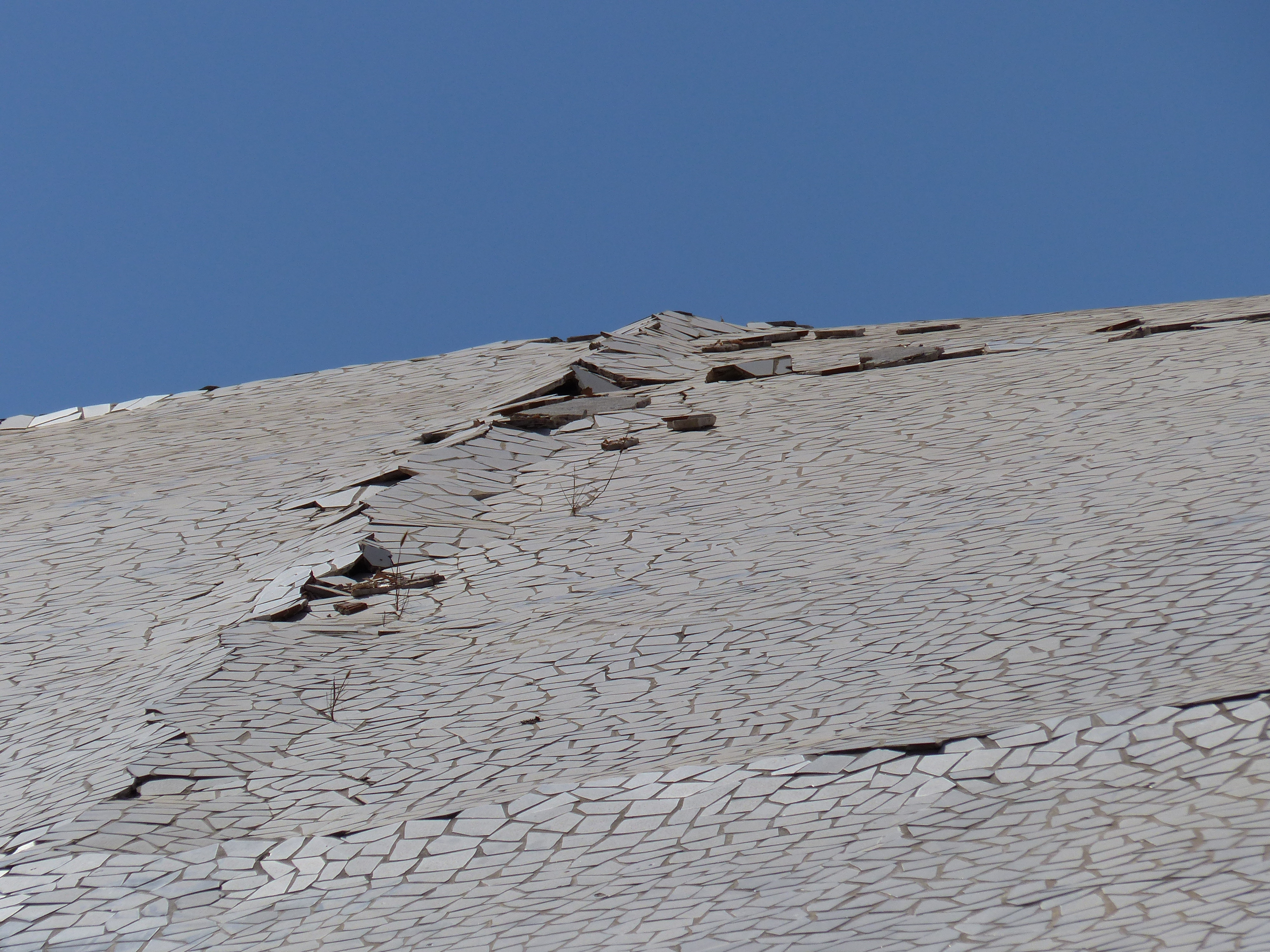
Missing and ill-fitting tiles on the wall in 2015.

There is visible damage to the trencadís tiles and the inside has moisture problems. Fixing the problems was budgeted as 2.7 million euros in 2017, but who should do the fixing is disputed between the Calatrava studio and the builders (Dragados, Acciona and Promotora Punta Larga).

The damage is non-structural but increases as time passes. A similar problem happens with Calatrava's Palau de les Arts in Valencia, Spain. The Auditorio de Tenerife has not yet been able to be restored as the court is waiting to decide whether the restoration will be paid for by the architect who designed it or by the construction companies.

== Uses ==
=== Cultural programming ===
The auditorium hosts various musical performances, such as Tenerife Danza, Atlantic Jazz, World Music and Great Performers in addition to hosting the Orquesta Sinfónica de Tenerife, the Tenerife Opera Festival and, together with the Teatro Pérez Galdós in Las Palmas de Gran Canaria, the sessions for the Canary Islands Music Festival (Festival de Música de Canarias).

=== Events ===
Auditorium facilities are designed to accommodate conferences, product launches and conventions. The auditorium building and its environment are also promoted as a location for filming commercials.

The area around the auditorium, are also used in the Armed Forces Day during the month of May, where the best pieces of artillery are exposed at the foot of the building like a "great outdoor military museum" it were. During the celebration of the Canary Islands Day (May 30), the Tenerife Auditorium hosts the Canary Awards and Gold Medals of the region. This act has the presence of President of the Canary Islands and the maximum regional authorities, and local island.

In September 2014, within the Starmus International Festival, the auditorium was visited by Stephen Hawking, who was considered the most famous scientist in the world.

=== Gala de los Premios de la Cadena Dial ===
The official Cadena Dial Awards have been held in the Auditorium of Tenerife since 2006 to 2013. The gala event brings together various national and international Latin singers including Laura Pausini, Chayanne, Amaral, Amaia Montero, Eros Ramazzotti, Beatriz Luengo, Camila, Estopa, Luis Fonsi, Tiziano Ferro, Manolo Garcia, Melocos, Melendi, La Oreja de Van Gogh, Pitingo, Rosario and Sergio Dalma. Familiar faces in show business, television and radio have presented the awards: Paz Vega, Santi Millán, Fernando Tejero, Marta Torné, José Mari Manzanares, Elena Rivera, Jose Ramon de la Morena, Pablo Motos and Gemma Nierga. One of the unique events at this gala is the singer's walk, a green carpet installed at the foot of the auditorium.

The awards reach across the Atlantic via the radio network Union Radio Kiss Radio in Colombia, Mexico, Chile and Costa Rica, Continental Radio in Argentina and Top 40 stations of Panama, Argentina, Guatemala and Ecuador. In addition, the gala is broadcast on TV Canaria and Cuatro TV.

== Criticism ==
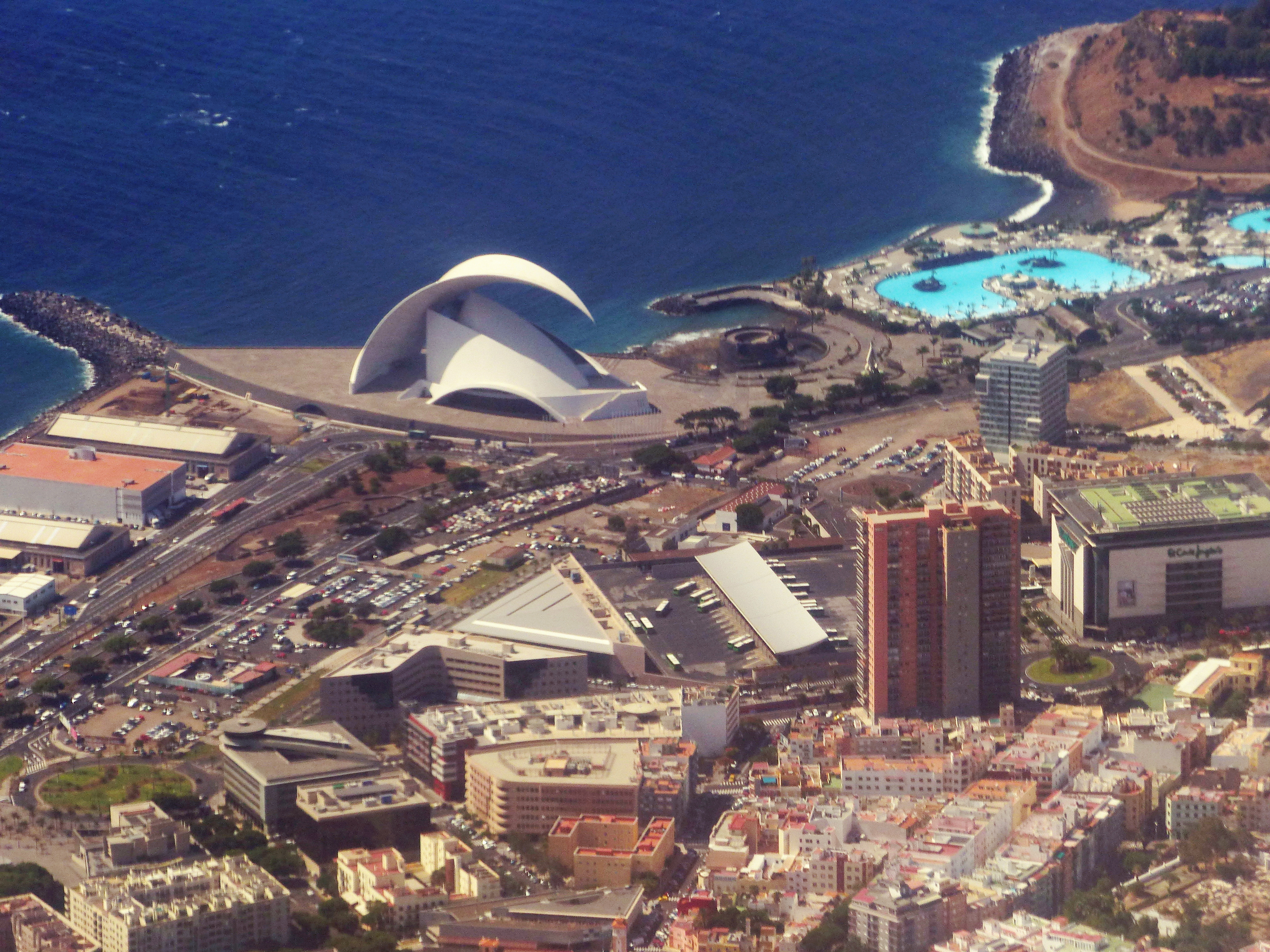
Aerial view of the Auditorio de Tenerife

The building has been criticized for several reasons, including the location, various structural problems, budget increases, and an alleged breach of safety rules.

Despite this criticism, the building is now considered an emblem of Santa Cruz de Tenerife and a distinctive symbol of the city and the island. It is also a significant tourist attraction.

== In popular culture ==
- In the film Rambo: Last Blood (2019), the Auditorio de Tenerife is visible in panoramic shots.
- The auditorium was used as the setting for the Doctor Who series 12 episode "Orphan 55" (S12 E03), which aired on January 12, 2020. The building was used in the story as a remote holiday spa that by the end of the episode turns out to have been built on a ruined, radioactive, and oxygen-deprived Earth after a devastating global nuclear war. In the episode, the spa was said to be somewhere near the Russian city of Novosibirsk.
- Part of the video for the Blas Cantó song "Universo", Spain's entry in the 2020 Eurovision Song Contest, was shot in the auditorium.
- In 2021, the building was featured in an episode of the Smithsonian Channel's How Did They Build That? entitled "Opera Houses".
- The series The One (2021) shot scenes in the auditorium.
- The series Foundation (2021) filmed scenes around the auditorium.
- In the Spanish series Una hora menos (2024), the Tenerife Auditorium and several other emblematic places in Santa Cruz de Tenerife and the island appear.
- In the American film Day Drinker (2026), starring Johnny Depp, several sequences were filmed in the building.
- Part of the music video for The Strokes' 2026 song "Going Shopping" was shot outside the building.

== See also ==
- Sydney Opera House
- Palau de les Arts Reina Sofia
- Spanish architecture
