= Meloneras =

- Town
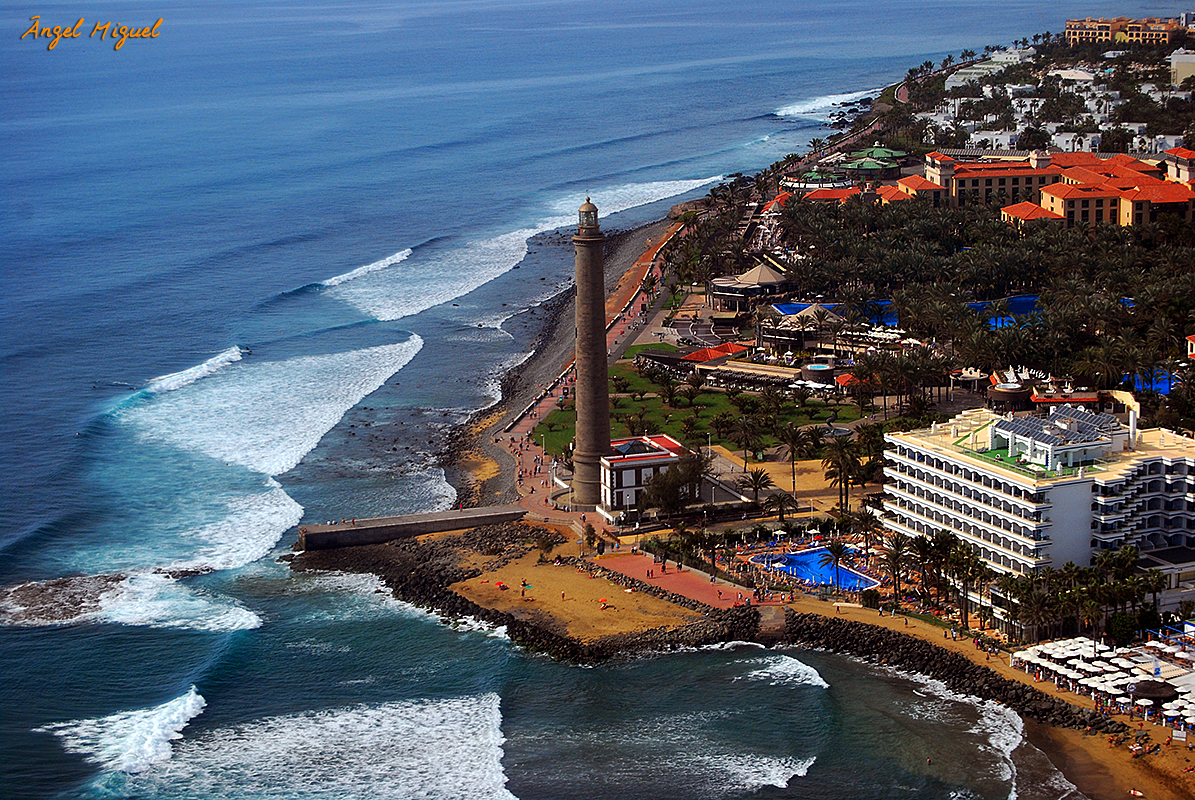
- Aerial view of Meloneras and the Maspalomas Lighthouse

- Location in Canary Islands
- Coordinates: 27.7398163°N 15.6050589°W
- Country: Spain
- Autonomous community: Canary Islands
- Province: Las Palmas
- Municipality: San Bartolomé de Tirajana
- Postal code: 35100

Meloneras is a tourist town on the south coast of the island of Gran Canaria, Canary Islands, part of the town of Maspalomas in the municipality of San Bartolomé de Tirajana.

It is mostly characterised by tourist hotels and other accommodations. Its most prominent landmark is the Faro de Maspalomas, next to Maspalomas Beach and the Maspalomas Dunes.

Some of the luxury hotel complexes in Meloneras display are notable for their Canarian Spanish Colonial Revival style, partly derived from de la Torre's Hotel Santa Catalina (1890) in Las Palmas. The Costa Meloneras Hotel, opened in 2000, the Villa del Conde hotel thas was opened in 2005, incorporates a replica of the nearby town of Agüimes (the home town of Eustasio López González, founder of the Lopesan Hotel Group), including a distinctive replica of the large, domed Church of San Sebastián, which serves as the hotel reception.
