= Intercambiador Tenerife =

Spanish public transport station

Coordinates: 28°27′33″N 16°15′6″W

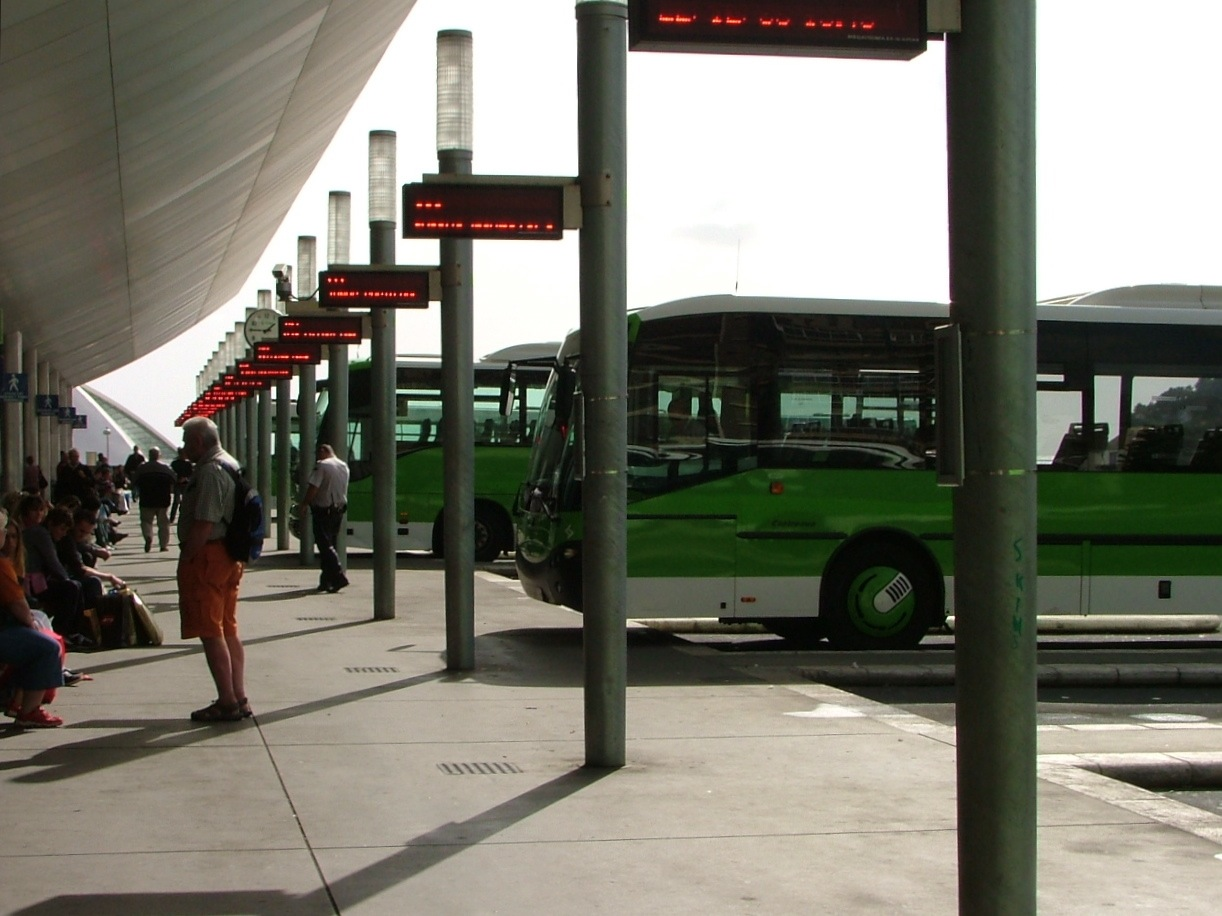
Passengers and TITSA long-distance buses in the Santa Cruz station

The Intercambiador (a.k.a. Tenerife Transport Interchange) in Santa Cruz de Tenerife, the capital of Tenerife, combines the main station of the TITSA public bus service with light rail line 1, FerryBus and a parking for private vehicles. The station was opened on 17 June 2006.

It is located on Avenida Tres de Mayo in the centre of Santa Cruz. The facility is a major, six-level Park-and-Ride that with an area of 66,235 square metres.

There are 1,416 private vehicle spaces, and the Interchange accommodates nine million passengers a year, with approximately 3,500 daily bus arrivals and departures to all points of the island. It is also the point of departure for Line 1 of the Tenerife Tram, which covers the route between Santa Cruz and San Cristóbal de La Laguna.

In December 2011, the main concourse was closed off for some months when the ceiling collapsed.

== Bus lines in the station ==
Level 2: Intercity and metropolitan (Northwest Tenerife) lines
Line	Platform	route	Destination
238	17	Santa Cruz – Somosierra – Taco	San Matías
233	18	Santa Cruz – Taco – El Cardonal – Las Chumberas	Finca España
232	19	Intercambiador – Somosierra – Taco – El Cardonal	La Gallega
231	20	Intercambiador – Los Majuelos	La Gallega
138	21	Santa Cruz – Tabaiba – Radazul – Tabaiba Baja	Santa Cruz
139	21	Santa Cruz – Tabaiba – Radazul – Tabaiba Baja	Santa Cruz
142	21	Santa Cruz – Añaza – Acorán	Barranco Hondo
122	22	Santa Cruz – Caletillas – Candelaria – Polígono Güímar	El Socorro
123	22	Santa Cruz – Caletillas – Candelaria	Araya
124	22	Santa Cruz – Caletillas – Candelaria – Polígono Industrial de Güímar – El Socorro – La Hidalga	Güímar
131	22	Santa Cruz – Calettilas – Candelaria	Igueste de Candelaria
120	23	Santa Cruz – Candelaria – Puertito de Güímar	Güímar
121	23	Santa Cruz – Candelaria – Arafo	Güímar
126	23	Santa Cruz – HUNSC – Hospital Universitario – Campus Guajara – Sta. María del Mar – Caletillas	Candelaria
111	24, 25	Santa Cruz – Enlaces autopista Sur – San Isidro – Tenerife South Airport – Las Chafiras – Los Cristianos	Costa Adeje
711	24, 25	Santa Cruz – Enlaces autopista Sur – San Isidro – Tenerife South Airport – Las Chafiras – Los Cristianos	Costa Adeje
no line	26	wider platform for wheelchair users	
110	27	Santa Cruz – San Isidro – Los Cristianos	Costa Adeje
106	28	Santa Cruz – Enlace Orotava – Enlace Realejos – S. J. de la Rambla	Icod
108	28	Santa Cruz – La Laguna – Enlace Orotava – Enlace Realejos – S. J. de la Rambla	Icod
310	29	Santa Cruz – La Laguna – Enlace Orotava	C.C. El Trompo/La Villa (Park and Ride)
103	30	Santa Cruz – La Laguna –	Puerto de la Cruz
102	31	Santa Cruz – La Laguna – Tacoronte – Enlace Orotova – Las Arenas	Puerto de la Cruz
104	31	Santa Cruz – La Laguna – Tacoronte – La Orotova	Puerto de la Cruz
105	32	Santa Cruz – La Laguna – Tegueste – Tejina – Bajamar	Punta del Hidalgo
015	33	Santa Cruz – Hospital Universitario – Campus Guajara	La Laguna
014	34, 35	Santa Cruz – La Cuesta –	La Laguna
026	36	Santa Cruz – Salud Alto – El Rocío (La Cuesta) – La Piterita – Finca España – Pueblo Hinojosa – La Verdellada	La Laguna
228	37	Santa Cruz – La Cuesta – Valle Tabares – Valle Jiménez – Las Casillas	Los Campitos

Level 1: Santa Cruz de Tenerife City buses
Line	Platform	route	Destination
947	01	Intercambiador – San Andrés – El Bailadero – Las Bodegas – La Cumbrilla –	Chamorga
946	01	Santa Cruz – Muelle Norte – San Andrés – Taganana – Roque de las Bodegas	Almáciga
945	02	Santa Cruz – Muelle Norte – San Andrés	Igueste de San Andrés
941	03	Intercambiador – Urbanización Añaza – Acorán	Boca Cangrejo
940	03	Intercambiador – Añaza – Urbanización Acorán	Urbanización Costanera
939	03	Intercambiador – Taco – El Sobradillo	Llano del Moro
937	04	Intercambiador – Taco – Tíncer	Cruce El Sobradillo
936	05	Intercambiador – Añaza – Santa María del Mar – Taco	Intercambiador
935	06	Intercambiador – Santa María del Mar – Añaza	Intercambiador
934	07	Intercambiador – Taco – Santa María del Mar – Añaza	Intercambiador
933	08	Intercambiador – Taco – Barranco Grande – El Pilar	El Tablero
919	08	Intercambiador – Barranco Santos – La Salud	Cuesta Piedra
917	09	Intercambiador – Muelle Norte	Valleseco (La Quebrada)
916	09	Intercambiador – Muelle Norte – María Jiménez	Los Valles
910	10, 11	Intercambiador – Muelle Norte – Valleseco – María Jimenez – Cueva Bermeja – Dársena Pesquera – San Andrés	San Andrés / Playa de Las Teresitas
909	14	Intercambiador – La Marina – Muelle Norte	Barrio La Alegría
908	13	Intercambiador – Tomé Cano – Somosierra/Cmno. del Hierro – Barrio de Ofra – Las Retamas	Intercambiador
906	14	Intercambiador – Tomé Cano – Benito Pérez Armas – Barrio la Salud	Cuesta Piedra
901	15	Intercambiador – Miraflores – Bélgica – La Salud	Cuesta Piedra
902	15	Intercambiador – Plaza Los Patos	Barrio Nuevo / Cueva Roja /Los Campitos

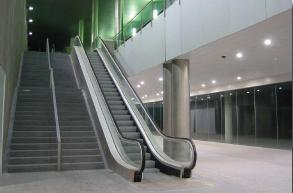
Interior at the Intercambiador de Transportes

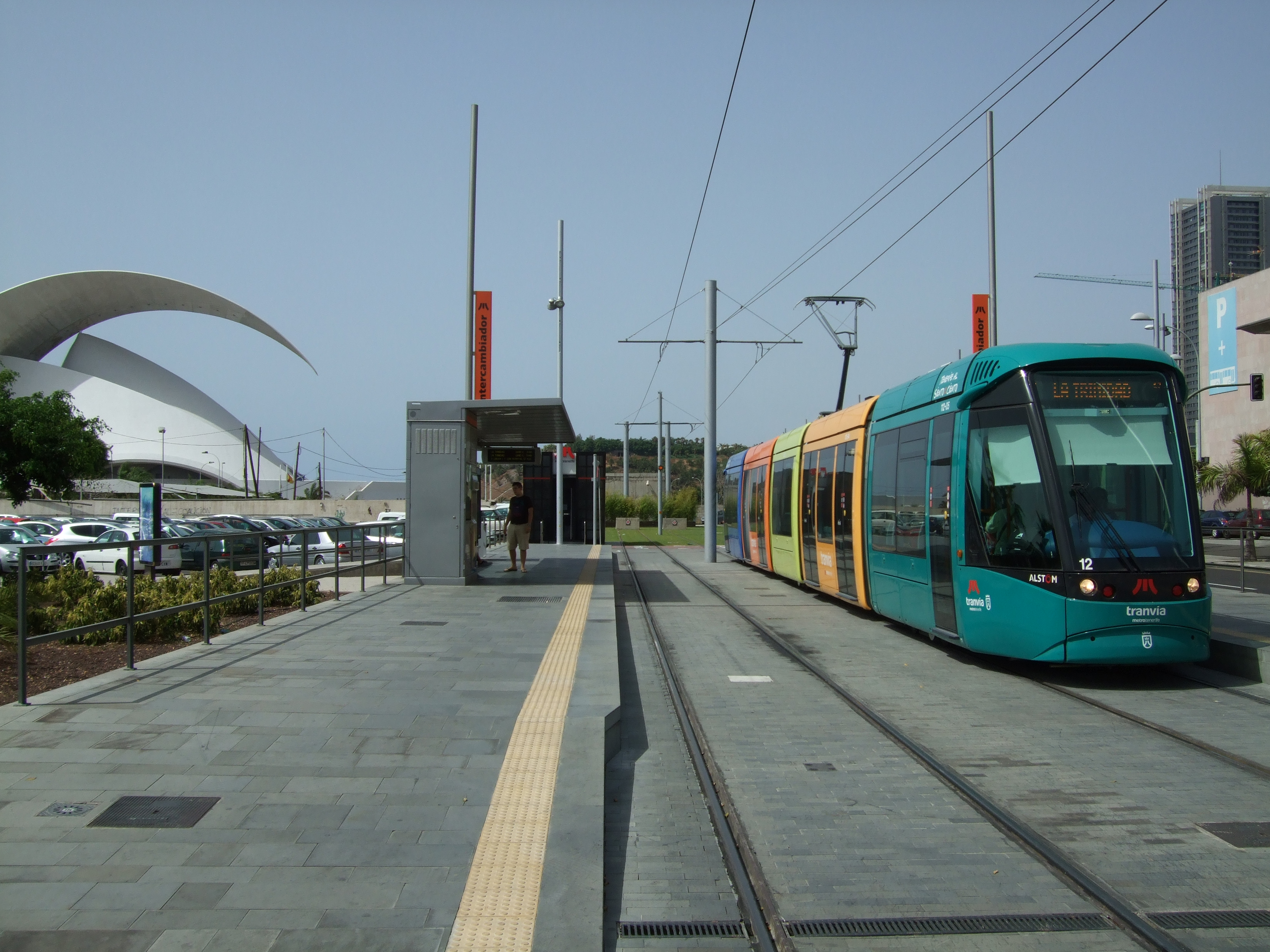
Tenerife Tram at Intercambiador, with the Auditorio de Tenerife in the background

Ground floor (main hall): special and night services
Line	Platform	route	Destination
Tram 1	E	Santa Cruz – Plaza Weyler – Cruz del Señor – Taco – Hospital Universitario – Campus Guajara	La Laguna (Trinidad)
912	E	Intercambiador – La Salle – 25 de Junio – Ifara	Los Campitos
914	E	Intercambiador – La Salle – Plaza Weyler – Calle El Pilar – Plaza España	Intercambiador
920	E	Intercambiador – La Marina – Ramblas – 3 de Mayo	Intercambiador
921	E	Intercambiador – 3 de Mayo – Ramblas – Mercado	Intercambiador
AeroExpress 20	E	Santa Cruz – La Laguna	Tenerife North Airport
014, 137	E	Santa Cruz – La Cuesta –	La Laguna / Tacoronte
015, AX20	E	Santa Cruz – Enlaces Autopista Norte TF-5	La Laguna / Aeropuerto Norte TFN
104	E	Santa Cruz – La Laguna – Tacoronte – La Orotova	Puerto de la Cruz
711	E	Santa Cruz – Enlaces autopista Sur – San Isidro – Tenerife South Airport – Las Chafiras – Los Cristianos	Costa Adeje
971	E	Intercambiador – Miraflores – La Salud – Vistabella	Las Retamas
972	E	Intercambiador – Miraflores – La Salud	Cuesta Piedra
934	E	Intercambiador – Somosierra – Taco – Santa María del Mar – Añaza – Taco – Somosierra	Intercambiador
Naviera Armas	E	FerryBus to Los Cristianos Port	La Gomera / La Palma / El Hierro
Fred Olsen Express	E	FerryBus to Los Cristianos Port	La Gomera / La Palma
