= Tren del Sur =

Railway line on the island of Tenerife, Canary Islands

Overview
- Status: In planning
- Termini: Intercambiador Tenerife; Las Américas
- Stations: 7

Service
- Operator(s): Metropolitano de Tenerife

History
- Planned opening: unknown

Technical
- Line length: 80 km
- Number of tracks: Double
- Track gauge: 1,435 mm (4 ft 8 1/2 in)

The Tren del Sur (Train of the South) is a planned railway line on the island of Tenerife, Canary Islands, linking the capital Santa Cruz de Tenerife with the south of the island via Tenerife South Airport.

== Background ==
A feasibility study on a railway line in Tenerife with a maximum speed of 220 km/h (140 mph) was first conducted in 1997.

Originally, detailed planning was to begin in 2010 with the line expected to fully open in 2018. However, in 2011 the plans were indefinitely postponed for economic reasons. In 2017 the plan was reactivated. The line is planned for an end-to-end journey time of 42 minutes, running at 15-minute intervals, carrying up to 64,000 passengers daily.

== Cost ==
In 2010 the estimated cost of the line was €1.8 billion, with the Ministry of Development allocating €5 million to the Cabildo de Tenerife to plan its construction.

== Route ==
The proposed route of 80 km will contain 7 railway stations with a possible extension to Fonsalía, but starting from Santa Cruz de Tenerife to Costa Adeje, with the journey taking approximately 42 minutes. Stations will be located in:

- Santa Cruz de Tenerife
- Añaza
- Candelaria
- San Isidro
- Tenerife South Airport
- Los Cristianos
- Playa de las Américas

== Tren del Norte ==
Along with the Tren del Sur plan, the Cabildo de Tenerife is studying a rail line linking northern towns on the island.
