= TITSA =

- Headquarters: Punta de Anaga,1; Santa María del Mar
- Locale: Tenerife
- Service type: bus service
- Website: titsa.com

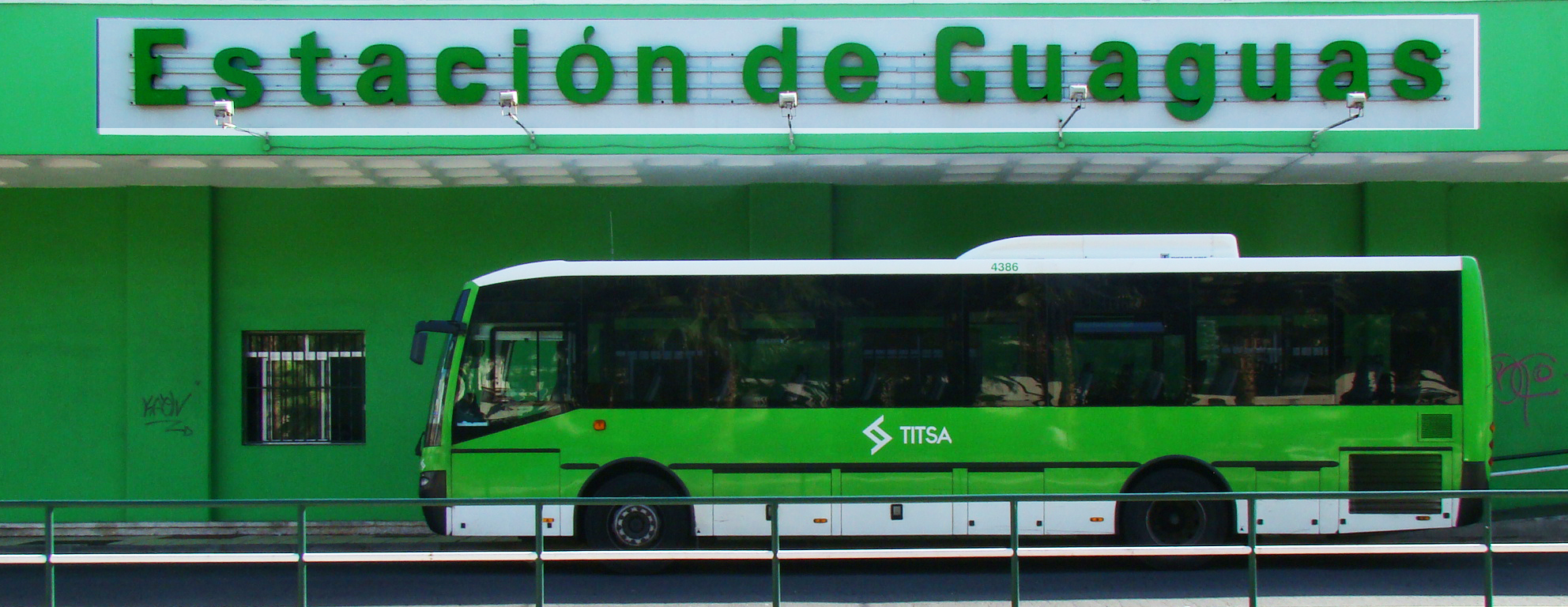
The former (taken in 2011) bus station, now replaced, of Puerto de la Cruz

TITSA is the Transportes interurbanos de Tenerife, S.A. which operates almost all public bus services in Tenerife, on the Canary Islands. It carries over 60 million travellers a year in a fleet of approximately 600 vehicles.

== History ==
In 1884, the Omnibus Company started a bus line between Santa Cruz and La Laguna operating a single one-horse open carriage. By 1885 they had the four and six horse stagecoaches, with an additional line from Santa Cruz to La Orotava. In 1898, development of the electric tram system began, with the inaugural trip in 1901. Soon the tram replaced horses on the existing lines, and a new line was built from Santa Cruz to Icod de los Vinos. In 1904 track was laid from La Laguna to Tacoronte. By 1950, the company had 21 km of track, with four stationhouses: Santa Cruz, La Cuesta, La Laguna and Tacoronte. By 1959 it was all abandoned; bus service had replaced the trams.

The Camacho Hotel Company had introduced the first gasoline powered bus in 1904. In 1927, the authorities decided to control bus service and divided the island into a north and a south zone. Two different bus companies won the contracts for the two zones. Although in 1928 they amalgamated to form a single company, different managers continued to manage different lines, and they did not always co-operate on schedules. The growth of improved roads between 1930 and 1950 gave the rail-independent buses the financial edge over the electric trams.

In 1942 the bus system was reorganized into an integrated system. In 1978, it changed its name to TITSA and the major shareholder (85%) was the Spanish state railway Renfe. In 1986, TITSA was handed to the Canaries Government. In 2007, TITSA was transferred to be directly administered by the Tenerife council, the Cabildo Tenerife.

Titsa bus fleet, locally known as "guagua" (single bus) or "guaguas" (multiple buses) are equipped with various sort of passenger comfort technologies, including USB ports and wifi.

A TITSA bus in Los Cristianos, Arona

== Depots ==
The company has five Depots:

- Intercambiador:Av.3 de Mayo
- Cuevas Blancas:C/Punta de Anaga
- Los Rodeos:Crta General Del Norte
- Cho/Parque la Reina:C/Levante
- San Jeronimo:C/Calados

== See also ==
- Intercambiador
