= Carnival of Santa Cruz de Tenerife =

Annual carnival in the Canary Islands

Santa Cruz de Tenerife Carnival
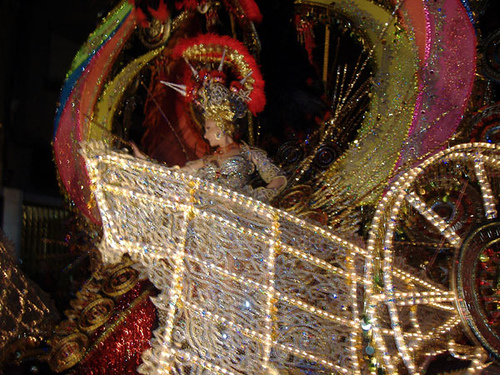
- The Queen of the Carnival on parade (2006)
- Genre: Carnival
- Date: February–March (depending on the year)
- Begins: Two weeks before Ash Wednesday (about 52 days to Easter)
- Ends: Weekend after Ash Wednesday
- Frequency: Annual
- Locations: Santa Cruz de Tenerife, Spain
- Major events: Parade, parties, Queen selection, Piñata weekend

Fiesta of International Tourist Interest
- Designated: 1980

The Carnival of Santa Cruz de Tenerife (Spanish: Carnaval de Santa Cruz de Tenerife) is held each February–March –depending on the year– in Santa Cruz de Tenerife, the capital of the largest island of the Canary Islands, Spain and attracts people from all over the world.

It is considered the second most important, most popular and internationally known carnival, after the one held in Rio de Janeiro (Brazil). Partially for this reason, the city of Santa Cruz de Tenerife is twinned with the city of Rio de Janeiro.

In 1981, it was declared a Fiesta of International Tourist Interest by the Secretary of State for Tourism. It aspires to become an intangible cultural heritage by UNESCO. In 1987, singer Celia Cruz went to the Carnival Chicharrero with Billo's Caracas Boys; attended by 250,000 people, the concert was registered in the Guinness Book of Records as the largest gathering of people in an outdoor plaza to attend a concert. In 2019 for its part, more than 400,000 people danced to the rhythm of Juan Luis Guerra during the Carnival of the day thus surpassing the record reached in 1987 with Celia Cruz. Although, however, due to the unexpected mass response there was no notary officializing this figure for the Guinness Book.

The festivities on the streets of Santa Cruz de Tenerife start on the Friday before Carnival with an opening parade, which reaches its height during the night when thousands of people in fancy dresses dance until the early hours of the next day. The party continues night after night until Ash Wednesday. That day, people of Santa Cruz de Tenerife celebrate the "entierro de la sardina" (burial of the sardine), and with this event the carnival is officially over. However, the party starts up again the following weekend, known as the weekend of the piñata.

The festival has two parts: the official Carnival, and the Carnival on the street. The official carnival has more than a hundred groups, including murgas, comparsas, rondallas and other musical groups. The street carnival is more loosely organized, and comprises the people celebrating on the streets. Thousands of people come each day to the streets to participate, most of whom wear a disguise in accordance with Carnival tradition.

== History ==
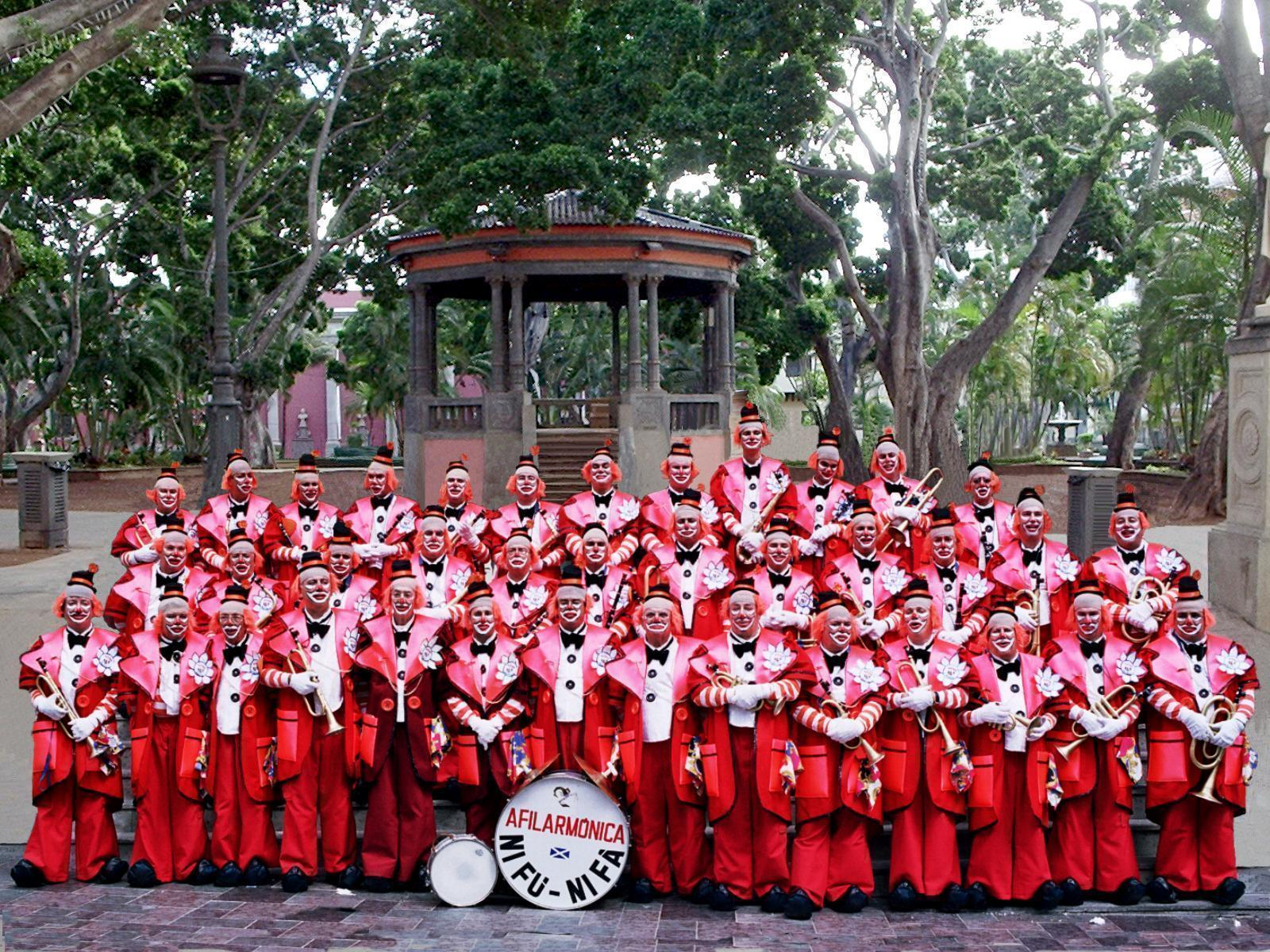
NiFú-NiFá Carnival orchestra

The Carnival of Santa Cruz de Tenerife has been celebrated since the time of the earliest European settlement, and possibly earlier. In 1605 Gaspar Luis Hidalgo alluded to the habit of reversing the sexes in dress. Early written references date from the end of the 18th century, in the writings of visitors. The journal of Lope Antonio de la Guerra Peña in 1778 includes a dance held in Santa Cruz de Tenerife, where he then talked about comparsas (bands playing conga music). In 1783, the Corregidor reported the use of masks "being banned by royal instructions". In practice the ban was not carried out, and a carnival feature was the mixing of the masked upper class with the common people.

=== Governmental ban ===
During the dictatorships of Miguel Primo de Rivera (1923–1935), and General Franco (1940–1960), the Carnival was known as "Winter holiday" as a ruse to circumvent the ban that had been enacted against it. Despite the ban, the festival continued to take place in Santa Cruz de Tenerife and Cádiz, Spain. In 1954 with Los Bigotudos (today known as Afilarmónica NIFU-NiFá) performed the first murga (musical theater).

=== Promotional posters ===
Since 1962, a poster for each year of the Carnival has been created. Artists such as John Galarza, Gurrea, Javier Mariscal, Dokoupil, César Manrique, Cuixart, Pedro González, Fierro, Paco Martinez, Mel Ramos, Enrique Gonzalez, Maribel Nazca, Elena Lecuona and many others have contributed to their designs. For the 2009 Carnival, it was proposed that an open competition take place for participants to design the official poster for that year.

=== Traditional events ===
The main venues for Carnival competitions and the election of the Queen have been the Teatro Guimerá (until 1985) and the Plaza de Toros (1986–1988) Its central circular stage was decorated with a silver crown in 1986–1987 and a golden crown in 1988. Additional venues have included the Plaza de España in 2005, the Centro Internacional de Ferias y Congresos de Tenerife and the Esplanade of Parks in 2008. Since the construction of the Centro Internacional de Ferias y Congresos de Tenerife, additional Carnival venues have varied.

In recent years tickets for several events (especially the Final Murgas Adultas Contest and the Gala of the Queen) have sold out completely (over 20,000 seats) between 15 and 60 minutes after tickets go on sale. The Gala of the Queen, with a stage spectacle that crowns the first lady of the Carnival and groups awarded for their efforts, is broadcast each year by a national network for the entire country and broadcast via satellite to all continents. Networks covering the event include RTVE, Televisión Canaria, Antena 3 Televisión, Canal +, Galavisión and Telecinco.

=== Capital of Carnival ===
In May 2000, the Carnival of Santa Cruz de Tenerife became the Carnival Capital of the World and headquarters of the 20th Convention of the Federation of European Carnival Cities (FECC). The convention, held on the island of Gran Canaria, featured appearances by Carnival performers and concluded with performers from the Carnival of Las Palmas.

=== Themes ===
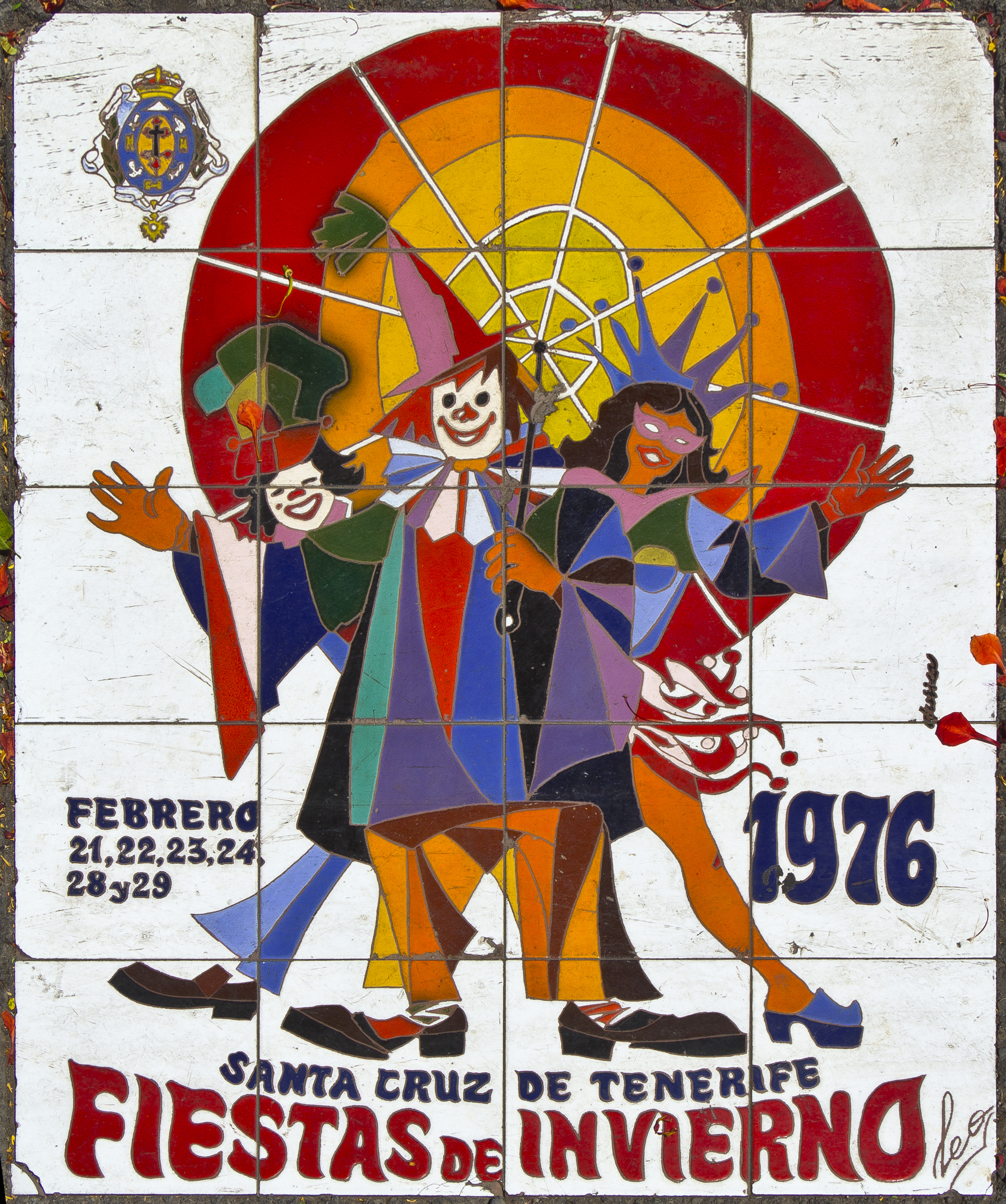
Carnival Poster (1976) on a tile located on Constitution Avenue (Santa Cruz de Tenerife).

- 1987 – Rome: This was the first year that the Carnival of Santa Cruz de Tenerife, was themed. For this, the perimeter of the Plaza de España was surrounded by an Ionic-style paired colonnade, giving the appearance of a circular Roman temple. The portal of the lintel of each pair of columns, was adorned by two Atlantic mackerel (chicharros) crowned with laurels. This was the year the Carnival of Santa Cruz de Tenerife entered the Guinness Book of World Records.
- 1988 – Wild World: The colonnade of the previous year was recycled, painted in salmon and topped with white palm leaves made from fiberglass, giving the appearance of palm trees. Every two or three palms were on platforms which were reproductions of previous carnival Queen costumes in white fiberglass. A model of King Kong stood on a pedestal
- 1989 – Millennial Egypt: The Plaza de España replaced the Plaza de Toros as the main stage. It was decorated with two large sphinxes and an Egyptian-style palace gate.
- 1990 – Story World: The scene at the Plaza de España was that of a story in two parts. One story was "happy" (with a smiley-faced house) and the other "dark", with a tree whose branches were shaped like hands in a tribute to the film Poltergeist.
- 1991 – Space: The tower of the Plaza de España was integrated into the scenery, transforming it into a giant telecommunications antenna dominated by metal, neon and laser lights.
- 1992 – Cinema: The stage of the Plaza de España evoked a Western movie set.
- 1993 – Circus: The stage was extended to almost half the surface of the square. This was the first year that Antena 3 Television broadcast the Queen Gala nationally and internationally (on Antena 3 Internacional); previously, it had been broadcast by RTVE, TVE1 and La2 TVE Internacional.
- 1994 – Atlántida: The stage was highlighted with oceanic colors. The gala was presented by journalist Willy García. The queen that year was Maria Candelaria Rodriguez, who wore "Diva" (by Marcos Marrero) for Casinos de Tenerife.
- 1995 – The Thousand and One Nights: Scenes from the Arabian story adorned the stage of the Plaza de España, inspired by the film Aladdin.
- 1996 – Mexico: The main stage of the Carnival moved to the newly opened Centro Internacional de Ferias y Congresos de Tenerife. The theatrical set evokes a neighborhood in Mexico, and the characters were stereotypical negative portrayals of Mexicans as "drunk, lazy and violent". The Mexican Consul was in attendance, and it was broadcast in America by Galavision and in Spain by Telecinco. The show nearly created a diplomatic conflict; Televisa closed its office in Tenerife, which was owned by Canal 7 del Atlántico (ECO Noticias). Construction errors on the set required help for the queen candidates to cross the stage. Its highlight was a performance by Enrique Iglesias.
- 1997 – Prehistory: The set was simple: a rocky mountain made of papier-mâché in the center of the Centro Internacional de Ferias y Congresos de Tenerife.
- 1998 – The Middle Ages: The set of that year was a medieval castle with flags, coats of arms and colored conical roofs.
- 1999 – Comic World: This marked a return to the Plaza de España, with a set filled with superheroes. Highlights were Captain America (known as "Super Chicha") and a giant bust of Lara Croft.

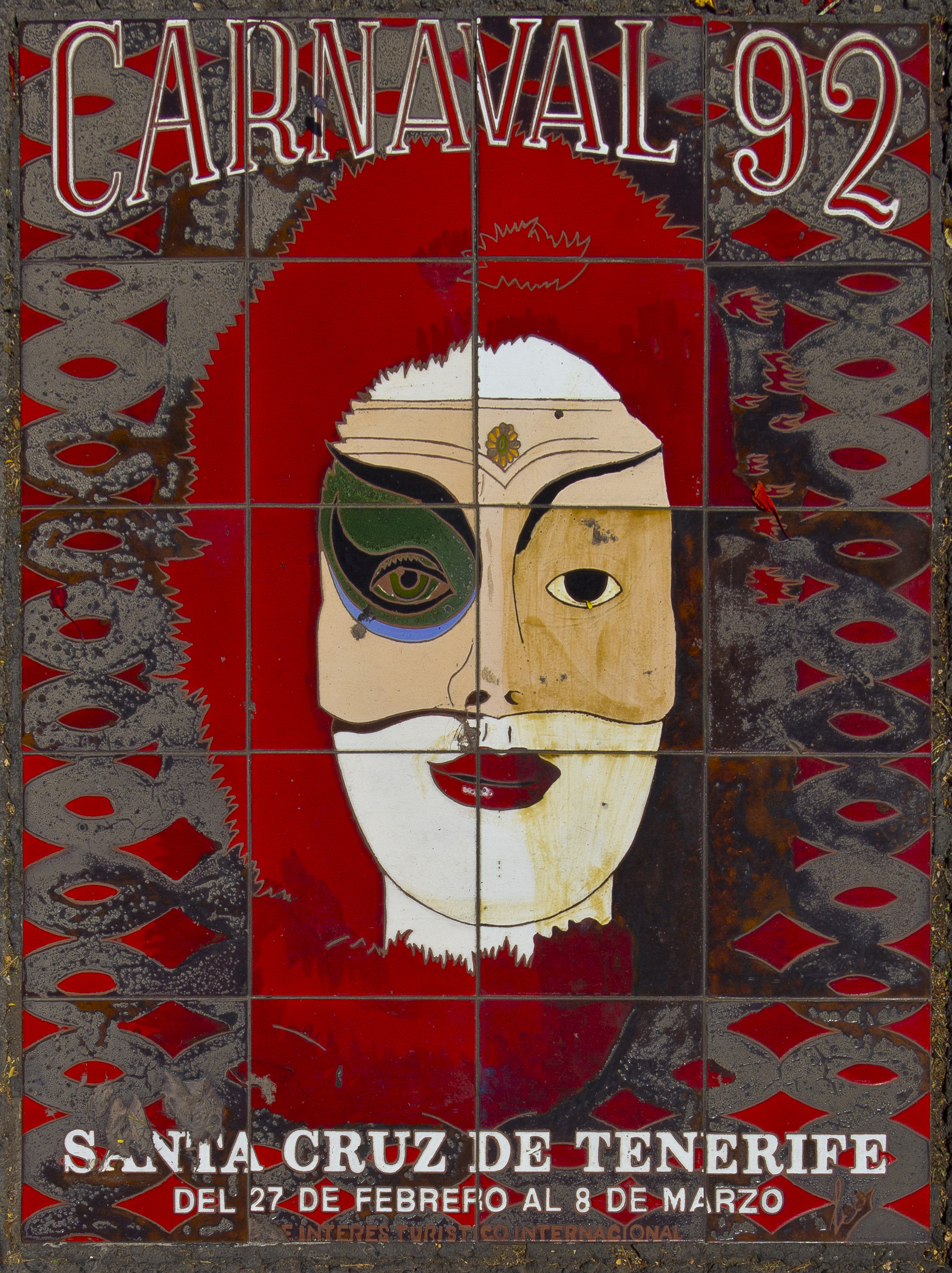
Carnival Poster (1992) on a tile located on Constitution Avenue (Santa Cruz de Tenerife).

- 2000 – Pirates: A pirate galleon was the centerpiece, surrounded by palm trees, islands, beaches and waves.
- 2001 – Space Odyssey: A spaceship was the main feature at the Plaza de España.
- 2002 – The Roaring 20s: The scene of the Plaza de España was decorated with motifs reminiscent of the first two decades of the 20th century. The Eiffel Tower was featured on stage, with the Statue of Liberty and the Golden Gate Bridge behind the Eiffel Tower.
- 2003 – The Far East (China): The center of the Plaza de España was occupied by a Chinese temple in red. A papier-mâché sculpture of the Buddha was withdrawn after protests by the Buddhist community of Tenerife, who objected to a religious figure being used frivolously. The main streets of Santa Cruz de Tenerife were decorated red and gold, with Chinese lanterns.
- 2004 – Celia Cruz: The stage at the Plaza de España was decorated as a Cuban neighborhood, with a neon sign reading "Celia Cruz" in blue.
- 2005 – Hollywood Musicals: The stage of the Spanish Steps was inspired by Hollywood black-and-white musicals.
- 2006 – Tribes: The stage was again moved to the Centro Internacional de Ferias y Congresos de Tenerife. Two sets (one primary and one secondary) were planned, joined by a footbridge. The decoration of both was based on graffiti and Web icons. It was originally intended to target "urban tribes" (punks and hippies) but was given a general theme of "tribes", which proved confusing.
- 2007 – Fashion: Known as the "Bitter Carnival" due to the negative role acquired by the director of that year's Gala Election of the Queen, Rafael Amargo (amargo in Spanish means "bitter") and the show itself.
- 2008 – Magic: The stage was moved to the parking lot of the Parque Marítimo César Manrique. The decor was inspired by the struggle between good and evil (white magic and black magic), incorporating motifs from The NeverEnding Story, The Lord of the Rings and Harry Potter.
- 2009 – Horror Films: This was known as "the anti-crisis Carnival". The main stage at the Centro Internacional de Ferias y Congresos de Tenerife was flat, without any carvings or models. The decoration was large-format canvases printed with motifs from an early influence of Ed Wood, Nosferatu. The satanic hymn "Ave Satani" (of the horror movie The Omen) was heard several times at the introduction to the gala.
- 2010 – Tenerife, Carnival History: At first the theme was "History of Mankind"; after a policy change in the city, it was changed to "Tenerife, story of a carnival".
- 2011 – Enrique González and Canary murgas: This year honored Don Enrique González, the "father of street musicians", founder of several acts of the carnival. The Murgas final was held for the first time in Heliodoro Rodriguez López Stadium, with an attendance of 20,000.
- 2012 – Flower Power: The stage was filled with hippies symbols and legends as "do not worry be hippy", volume figures, and drawings of characters with clothing hippies. He also decorated the stage a number of city buildings painted with psychedelic style. At the gala queen issues highlighted as the man on the Moon, the Vietnam War, student protests, the struggle for the protection of nature and the rise of New Age. There was a great tribute to bands and singers of the 60 among which were The Beatles and The Rolling Stones among others.
- 2013 – Bollywood: The India: First time for the theme of Carnival to be chosen by internet voters. The stage was based on those used in the Eurovision Song Contest, with a large LED screen, the largest in Europe. The Carnival Queen was chosen by choreographer and Bollywood actor Sunny Singh (born in Bombay), and the president of the jury was the consul of India in Canary Islands, Boagwandas Gope Mahtani.
- 2014 – The Cartoons: This was the first year that the placard of the carnival was chosen by the citizens. However, there was controversy about various problems with the voting process. The voting results were cancelled and the organizers of the contest decided who the winner would be. The stage was once again a LED screen, imported this time from Belgium and featuring a surround effect. A second screen was also incorporated. During the gala it showed various cartoon characters including: Cinderella, The Little Mermaid, the Pink Panther, Inspector Gadget, Barbie, Tadeo Jones, The Lion King and Monster High. They also showed characters from Warner Bros and Hanna Barbera, as Sylvester, Tweety and Scooby-Doo.

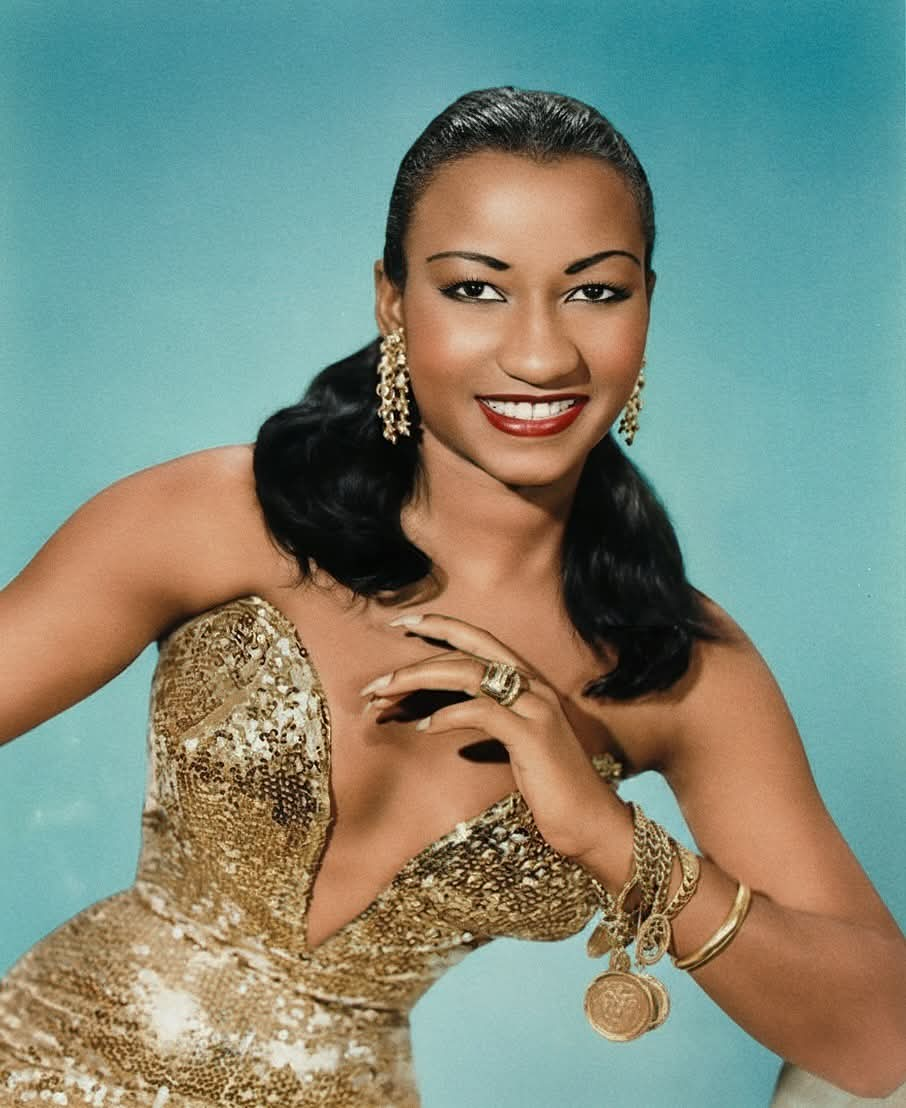
The singer Celia Cruz was always a great promoter of the Carnival of Santa Cruz de Tenerife. In 2004 was declared by the city as "Queen of Honor of Carnival of Santa Cruz de Tenerife".

- 2015 – The Future: Nearly 7,000 attendees enjoyed an overture that recreated the planet Earth in the future, featuring robots, dancers, stilt walkers and galactic beings from other planets. Several trapeze flying over the fairgrounds in Tenerife and a giant human figure moved among the spectators up to the stage, the style of La Fura dels Baus. All wrapped by light and images projected the large LED screen more than 50 meters wide that surrounded the stage. The collaborative program of Antena 3 "El Hormiguero" Anna Simon, was a presenter at the event. She was accompanied by two canaries communicators, Ivan Bonales and Manuel Artiles. One of the most exciting moments of the Gala was when revived on stage the Guinness record who fought in the Plaza de España in 1987. That year more than 200,000 people danced to salsa queen Celia Cruz. The tables were filled with dancers from different Carnival parades and voices six singers did a review of the great successes of the Cuban artist.
- 2016 – The Roaring 80s: This time the LED screen is removed and the traditional Carnival decorated recovers, with ochenteros recover reasons: a pseudo reproduction of a "Game Boy"; giant tape "cassette"; Play a stuffed Mobile honoring Freddie Mercury...
- 2017 – Caribbean: The Gala of Election of the Queen was directed (for second consecutive year), by Enrique Camacho, and also repeated like master of ceremonies the singer Jadel, this time accompanied by the artist Roko. More than 5,000 spectators head to the gala at the Recinto Ferial de Tenerife, an event for which just a week before the tickets sold out. The Gala was broadcast live by the Televisión Canaria and Televisión Española, through La 2 de TVE and TVE International, being the year (until then) in which this party has had more international media repercussions. The Gala staged a "trip" in a cruise through the Caribbean, where there was a tribute to the carnival of different Caribbean countries such as Puerto Rico, Cuba, Jamaica, Bahamas, etc. Also during the Gala was the homage to Antonio Messeguer, Que He said goodbye to the character he gave life to during the carnival of the last decades, Fidel Castro, with a great ovation of all the spectators. In addition to the year 2017, it was recorded as the year of the inauguration of the Carnival House of Santa Cruz de Tenerife, a museum dedicated to the history of this emblematic festival.
- 2018 – The Fantasy: For the first time in the history of Carnival, three women acted as masters of ceremony at the Queen's gala: Laura Afonso, from Canarias Radio; Eloísa González, of Televisión Canaria, and Berta Collado, which has been linked to Antena 3, Cuatro and La Sexta. He also had the stellar performance of Olga Tañón. The stage is the largest of those built in the Tenerife Fairground with its more than 2,100 square meters. The gala began with the projection on the screens of a child who had found a book in an enchanted forest and raised it from among the chairs of the Fairgrounds to the Carnival stage. It was a story with fairies, enchanted trees and unicorns... The overture, due to the quality of the projections, enhanced the stage, with a cascade that set itself on fire, a great virtual dragon and others were projected on the stage. One of the most emotional moments of the night came when the young Saida Prieto could fulfill her dream of returning to parade as a candidate at the gala of the election of the queen, something that in 2013 could not perform, because minutes before climbing to the scenario a fateful accident caused the girl and her suit to end in flames. The humorous note of the gala was given by the Abubukaka group. During this year a record was registered, with a participation of more than one million people, 12 million citizens who visited the official profiles of the party on social networks. Also, 50 million viewers saw at some point the retransmits of the main events of the Santa Cruz de Tenerife Carnival through the different televisions.
- 2019 – The marine depths: The main stage of the carnival this time is chaired by a six meter tall bust of Poseidon, the Greek god of the sea. This sculpture is made by Valencian Falles masters and was transferred to the island of Tenerife from Valencia by sea along with other sets that make up the stage as a great ship wrecked ten meters long and six meters high. In addition, 140 corals were molded with striking colors, orange, green and pink. Several films were also inspired in the sets, among which are Finding Nemo. In total, the stage measures 15 meters and with giant screens that simulate the bottom of the sea with fish. The Queen's Election Gala was directed one more year by Enrique Camacho. The introduction of the same allowed the public to delve into the deep sea, where they waited, a host of aquatic animals. One of the most emotional moments of the night took place when the audience also stood up to cheer and support a candidate who, while marching, fell to the ground and, before the weight of her suit, could not get up by herself. The presenter of the gala was the journalist Laura Afonso, who throughout the event was accompanied by other presenters, such as the last three queens of the carnival, Maria Rozman, Elvis Sanfiel or K-Narias. Guest artists were Carlos Baute and Marta Sánchez. The gala was broadcast live on Televisión Española and on the International Channel, as well as on Televisión Canaria. During the celebration of the Carnival by day the record reached in 1987 with Celia Cruz was surpassed, because in 2019 and according to data of the local Police more than 400,000 people danced to the rhythm of Juan Luis Guerra and with Celia Cruz they had been 250,000. Given this unexpected fact and lack of a notary, the record could not be included in the Guinness Book of Records.
- 2020 – The 1950s: Known as "El Carnaval de La Calima", due to the dust in suspension from the Sahara desert that covered the entire Canary archipelago during the first days of the carnival celebration in the street. The queen's gala featured performances by Paulina Rubio and Soraya Arnelas. As a novelty, the queen candidates were able to access the stage twice at the end of each first round of the participants. The gala was directed by designers Marcos Marrero and María Díaz. In the final moment, only eight queen candidates took the stage, because despite the large dimensions of the stage, it fell short to accommodate all the candidates at the same time. During the gala, which started with an overture based on the popular song "Santa Cruz en Carnaval", 16 candidates paraded through a stage that, like every year, also received the Queen of the Venezuelan Canarian Home. The gala featured singer Soraya Arnelas, who in addition to singing acted as master of ceremonies with Alexis Hernández and Pedro Rodríguez.
- 2021 – Carnivals of the World: Due to the COVID-19 pandemic, the Santa Cruz de Tenerife Carnival is not celebrated this year in person. Some acts and documentaries related to the carnival are broadcast virtually. There was also no new Carnival Queen but there was a guardian of the scepter who will be in charge of guarding it until the election of the Carnival Queen can be celebrated again. The applicants will be young people, girls and adults who have already been proclaimed queens in years past. This gala had the stellar participation of the Mexican singer Carlos Rivera. The Carnival House hosted an exhibition entitled "Traditional Carnivals in the Canary Islands" with representations of Los Toros de Tao and Tiagua, Los Diabletes of Teguise, Los Buches of Arrecife (all of them from Lanzarote), Los Carneros de Tigaday in El Hierro, Achipencos in Fuerteventura or Los Empolvados, like Los Indianos of La Palma, among others.
- 2022 – Science fiction: For the first time in history, the Santa Cruz de Tenerife Carnival was held in summer, in the month of June. This was due to a decision by the City Council to be able to celebrate it as in pre-covid times, since in the month of February of that year the health indicators discouraged a street carnival. The Queen's Gala featured the stellar performance of the singer Chanel Terrero, this being her first performance after her participation in May of that year in the Eurovision Song Contest representing Spain. Artists such as Anuel AA, Myke Towers, Nicky Jam and Jhay Cortez also performed. As in previous years, both the Grand Gala of the Queen and the Rhythm and Harmony Contest were broadcast live on Televisión Canaria and through La 2 of Televisión Española for all of Spain and the world. Ruth González was elected Queen of the Carnival succeeding Sara Cruz, who was the Queen of 2020 and has had the longest reign of the Santa Cruz de Tenerife Carnival. During the parade, one of the carnival queen candidates was unable to access the stage's turntable because her costume exceeded the weight limit. There was also a tribute to the victims of the volcanic eruption of La Palma in 2021 during the Gala, with some reporters from La Palma and other islands from both Televisión Canaria and Televisión Española in the Canary Islands participating as presenters of the queen candidates. There was also a new voting system where the public could participate in the election with SMS messaging.
- 2023 – New York, the city that never sleeps: The Santa Cruz de Tenerife Fairgrounds once again hosted a gala in which Carlos Rivera was once again the star of the night. The opening of the gala was planned as a trip to New York for three hours with more than 3,000 members of groups as fellow passengers. The set design was based on the city's skyline, with emblematic skyscrapers such as the Empire State Building, the Chrysler Building and One World Trade Center. On one side of the stage there was also a gigantic Statue of Liberty. During the gala, the Latin culture of New York was honored by waving the flags of countries such as Mexico, Puerto Rico or Cuba together with the flag of Tenerife itself. They highlighted urban dances, tap dancing and a play of lights in a musical overture with a strong visual and sound impact. It was one of the most attended galas in recent years. The party as a whole brought together more than a million people between all the days of celebration, tens of thousands of attendees came from other islands and many others from other parts of Spain and the world, being one of the most massive editions of the last years.
- 2024 – The Television: The gala was a nostalgic reminder of the great musical hits on television from the 1990s. It began as a musical journey, by comedian Aaron Gómez, who immersed attendees in classic television melodies, such as I'll be there for you, from the popular series Friends, and Hay que venir al sur, by Raffaella Carrà. The historical tour transcended with a clear ovation from the public, which in turn was mixed with a rapping by Gómez that made visible the classic Carnival nights, with early morning meetings in Plaza España and the classic smell of roast potatoes. The gala was also a tribute to Broadway and Madrid musicals, and they also recalled the Latin splendor, with a historical nod to artists like Celia Cruz. Later, Latin rhythms by Tony Tun Tun and a performance by Mónica Naranjo, who delighted the audience with her classic Sobreviviré, played. The stage, in pink and green tones, featured a figure of King Kong with a chicharro in his hand, climbing the Cross of the Monument to the Fallen in the Plaza de España in Santa Cruz de Tenerife, while another figure, this one of the carnival hero Super Chicha tries to take him down.
- 2025 – Secrets of Africa: This year, the opening of the gala was particularly criticised due to discordant and asynchronous elements. Televisión Canaria at a regional level and La 2 of Televisión Española at a national level were the two television channels in charge of broadcasting an event that was also broadcast by the International Channel. The gala was directed by Jep Meléndez and held at the Fairgrounds, and was completely full with the 7,000 spectators expected. The presenters of the gala, Lara Álvarez and Alexis Hernández, led a gala full of references to the African continent with the utmost respect for its culture. On Monday, March 3, a brawl occurred in which a resident of Las Palmas de Gran Canaria died, which is why the events of that day were suspended due to weather conditions. This event has caused a great stir at a local and regional level, generating unrest, rejection and criticism of what happened.
- 2026 – Latin rhythms: The gala's opening was a tribute to the culture and music of Latin American countries. The gala, once again directed by Daniel Pages, was held at the Santa Cruz de Tenerife Fairgrounds, which was packed to capacity with 1,700 people. Carla Castro Castellano, with her "Icónica" costume, was chosen as the new Carnival Queen. The gala was broadcast again by the main regional television channels throughout Spain and abroad.

=== Noise complaint ===
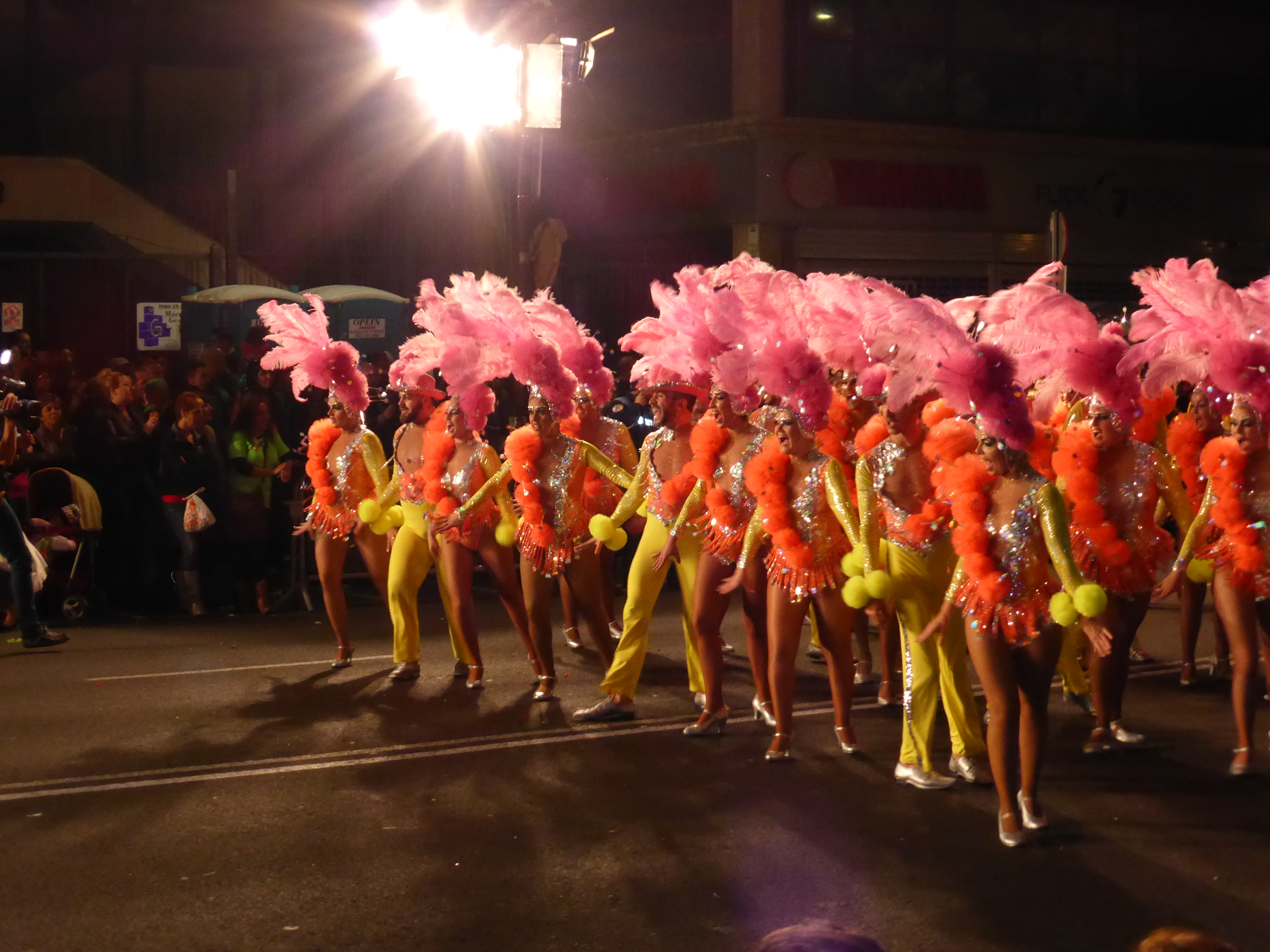
Parade of the Saturday of Carnival in Santa Cruz de Tenerife (2016).

In January 2006 a group of neighbors in Santa Cruz de Tenerife filed a complaint with the Board of Administrative Disputes, supported by eight community buildings and ten residents of the area known as the "ring" (the middle of the festivities). They asked for suspension of the Acts of Carnival in the city center. Several volunteer groups decided in the lawsuit to seek damages. The City Council awarded at least 180 million euros to cover collateral damage. Finally, according to the ruling "the generic request for suspension of the carnival is in no way excessive and could be subject to a full assessment. It is obvious that the carnival is composed of a plurality of events, the adequacy of social discomfort and noise both have separate ratings according to the social reality of the time that the rules must be applied for, as the public prosecutor warns, not all such actions have the same capacity to undermine fundamental rights and therefore that in no way justifies the request for suspension of Carnival because of the violation of fundamental rights." The order added that the neighbors broke the principle of good faith by failing to notify the Town Hall before the Carnival and submit a comprehensive plan, leaving the door open to further demands. That year a storm also struck Tenerife, delaying Carnival plans.

This decision was appealed by the neighbors before the Board of Administrative Disputes Tribunal Superior de Justicia de Canarias (TSJC), which resolved the violation of fundamental rights by the Carnival of 2006 and 2007. In the legal basis of the fifth sentence, suspending the Carnival was not considered appropriate. However, the TSJC said "in no case" noise at night could exceed 55 decibels and that the city should take the necessary steps to control it while moving (if necessary) "the evening activities to residential areas". On Thursday, 8 February 2007, a judge of the Administrative Dispute No. 1 in the capital suspended night dances held in the center, as they violated the fundamental rights of neighbors. On Monday, 12 February 2007, after negotiation with both parties, the court declared inadmissible the suspension of acts of Carnival in the streets. The reason was that this was already resolved for 2007 by the 2006 ruling of the Chamber for Contentious Administrative Tribunal Superior de Justicia de Canarias.

=== 2007 Holiday Act ===
On 14 February 2007 the Parliament of the Canary Islands, in an extraordinary meeting, unanimously approved a new law lifting environmental-noise regulations during certain dates at the discretion of municipalities.

== Daily events ==
During the weeks preceding the Wednesday election of the Carnival Queen, there are contests for adults and children comparsas, lyrical and musical groups, rondallas (string ensembles), the Queen of the Elderly, the Child Queen, Song of Laughter and adult and children's murgas. The official Carnival song is chosen, which will be presented to the Queen candidates in the hall of the City Council. Also featured are a choreography contest and a contest rewarding the most original floats and decorated cars. Nearly a month earlier, preparation starts with the official presentation at the Calle de La Noria. Shortly before Christmas, the Carnival poster is released.

=== Wednesday: Carnival Queen selection ===
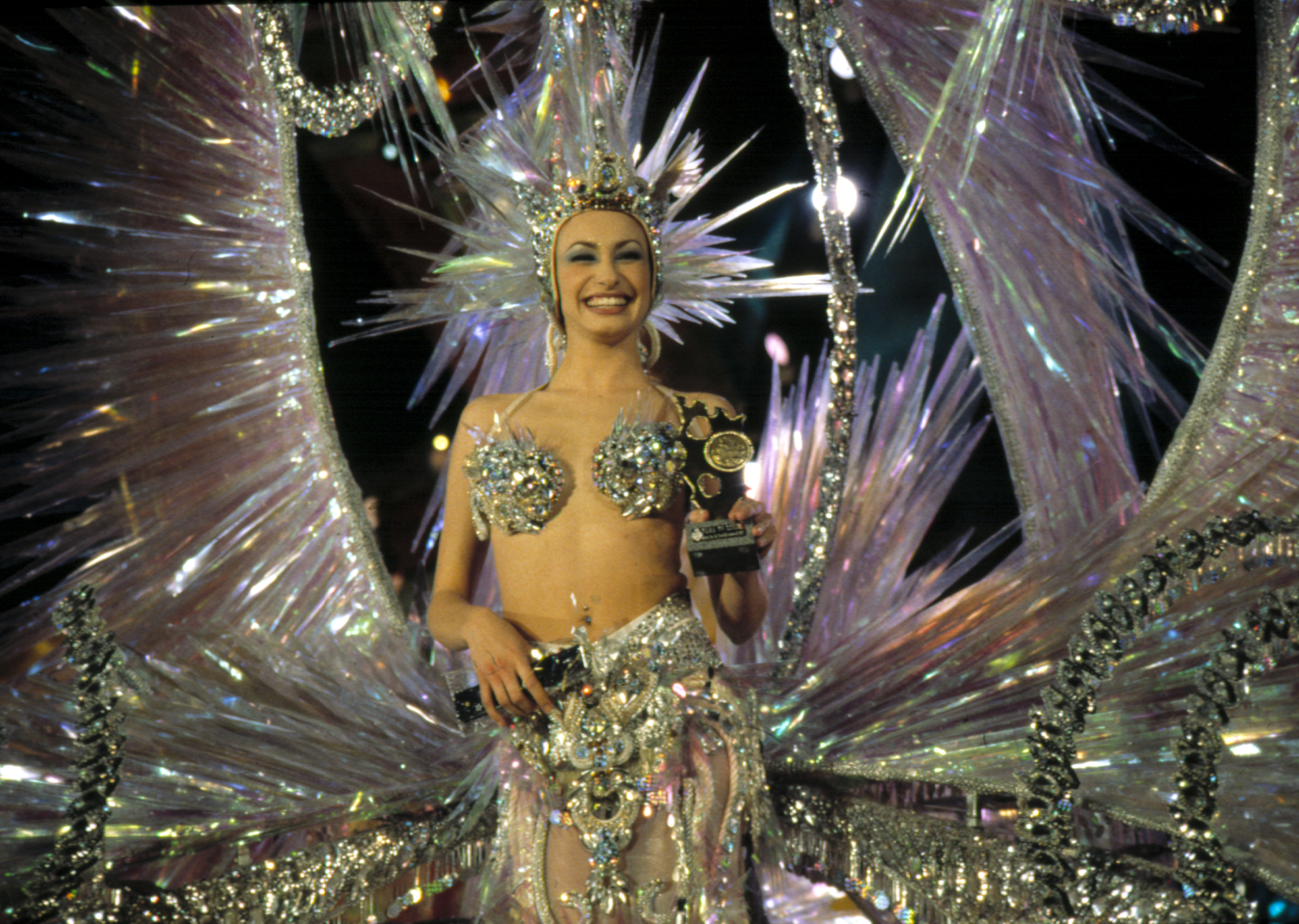
2001 Carnival Queen candidate

The Wednesday before Carnival weekend, the Queen of the Carnival is elected during the so-called Gala Reina. The event is usually broadcast to the entire country, and abroad by satellite. During the gala, the candidates parade across the main stage in their rich and beautiful costumes that might weigh up to 100 kilograms. A jury composed of members of the municipal corporation and celebrities chooses the queen; there is also a vote via SMS (short messaging service). After choosing the bridesmaids, the mayor hands the sceptre to the winner. Since the costumes are heavy, the candidates rely on wheeled transportation. The costumes are also expensive, so the candidates are sponsored (usually by a multinational corporation with a presence on the islands). The Hogar Canario Venezolano also sends its own Queen and holds a privileged position in the next Announcement Parade. Costumes are usually made of feathers, plastic, metal and paper. The queen is responsible for representing the carnival at tourism fairs as an ambassador for the Canary Islands.

=== Friday: Announcement Parade ===
On Friday the Announcement Parade is held, in which all participating groups march along the main thoroughfares of the city announcing the arrival of the carnival. The parade begins at the Parque La Granja, concluding at the Plaza de España. It crosses the Ramblas, Avenida Islas Canarias, Plaza Weyler and Méndez Núñez to return to Las Ramblas, then turning onto the Avenida Anaga and ending at the Plaza de Europa or the Council of Tenerife building. The queen and the bridesmaids (on their own floats) are escorted by the murgas and rondallas. Private carriages also participate in the parade, which lasts more than four hours. That night, the street carnival officially begins.

=== Carnival Saturday ===
The Saturday of Carnival is a day dedicated entirely to dance. There are two main venues: one in the Plaza de la Candelaria (which replacing the one in the Plaza de España during its renovation) and one in the Plaza del Príncipe. Depending on the holiday, one or more stages are built in the Plaza de Europa for electronic music, or tents in the Plaza de la Iglesia de la Concepción and the Plaza de Europa feature Latin music. Dances not only cover the three points but all the connecting streets, bars and cars playing their own music. One of the main streets of the carnival is Bethencourt Afonso, popularly known as Calle San José.

=== Carnival Monday (Lunes de Carnaval) ===
This is a day of feasting, with performances at the main venues in the capital. Since 2009, the Plaza de la Candelaria is home to the Santa Cruz Dance Carnival, an electronic-music event which in its first edition featured DJs Armand Van Helden, Ron Carroll, DJ Craze, Roger Sanchez, DJ Dario, Real El Canario and DJ Ser.

=== Tuesday: Grand finale ===
On Carnival Tuesday a Coso (parade) runs along the Avenida de Anaga, marking the official end of Carnival. Again march carnival groups, floats, decorated cars and the Carnival Queens. During the afternoon a show is held especially for tourists arriving by bus from other areas of the Canary Islands.

=== Ash Wednesday: Burial of the sardine ===
On Ash Wednesday, the first day of Lent, is celebrated "the burial of the sardine". The streets of Santa Cruz are draped in mourning. A giant sardine made of paper is carried in a funeral procession, followed by wailing widows. The Catholic Church is mocked, with participants dressed as popes, bishops and nuns imitating blessings and other religious rites (often accompanied by sexual objects). A few years ago, the decision of the Hall of Santa Cruz de Tenerife to reschedule the burial of the sardine to the following Friday (to coincide with the arrival of a cruise tour of the city) sparked a controversy that led some groups to arrange an alternative funeral for the sardine on Wednesday, replacing the burning of the sardine with placing candles at the monument of the Chicharro in Santa Cruz de Tenerife.

=== Piñata weekend ===
The weekend puts an end to "Don Carnal" until the next year and whose role, especially on Saturday, has grown in recent decades to the point of having internationally renowned entertainment comparable to the Monday of Carnival.

- Saturday of Piñata (Sábado de Piñata): Since 2008 it was called the "Carnival by Day", although its first edition had to be moved to the following Sunday because of inclement weather. From 12:00 to 16:00, it is celebrated with simultaneous musical performances at three venues in the center of the city: Plaza Weyler, Plaza del Príncipe and Plaza de la Candelaria.
- Sunday of Piñata (Domingo de Piñata): On Sunday morning the Old Cars Contest is held, followed by a traditional performance of the Afilarmónica NIFU-NiFá and the year's vocal-group winner at Plaza del Príncipe. The carnival concludes at night with a fireworks display.

== Social area and sociocultural dimension ==
=== Super Chicha ===
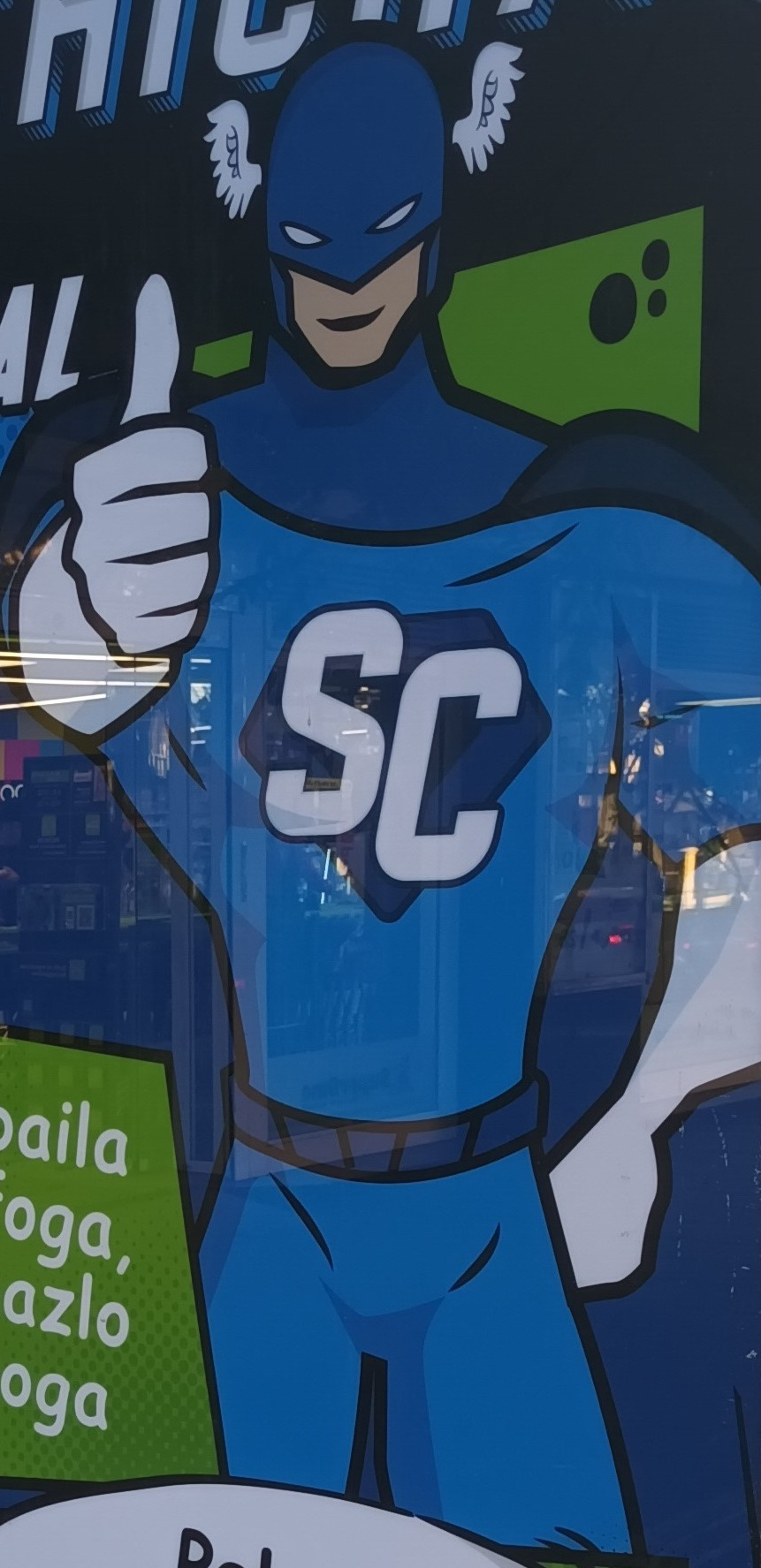
Super Chicha represented in an advertising panel related to the carnival, in Santa Cruz de Tenerife.

Super Chicha was a fictional character created for the Carnival of Santa Cruz de Tenerife in 1999 and who became an allegorical and recurring character of the carnival. To preside over that year's stage whose theme was the world of comics, a monumental statue of a patriotic superhero from the island of Tenerife was created by the designer Guillermo Afonso, inspired by Captain America.

After the carnival, the original sculpture of Super Chicha was exhibited in the market of the La Salud neighborhood in Santa Cruz de Tenerife until 2012, when the City Council was forced to dismantle the sculpture due to its deterioration. Despite the fact that the statue already does not exist as such, Super Chicha has become one of the most endearing and beloved carnival characters, to the point of being popularly considered the "mascot" of the Carnival of Santa Cruz de Tenerife.

=== Musical themes ===
- Santa Cruz en Carnaval: It is the anthem of the Carnival of Santa Cruz de Tenerife par excellence. The song composed in 1974 by Agustín Ramos, with lyrics by the poet Delfín Yeste. The song was composed in the midst of the fall of the Franco regime to extol the true meaning of the festival as carnival, instead of "winter festivals", which is how the festival had been renamed during the dictatorship. The best-known version currently is that of the Billo's Caracas Boys orchestra.
- Chicharrero de Corazón: This is a song created by the murga Ni Pico-Ni Corto in 2008 and which has become another of the hymns of the Carnival of Santa Cruz de Tenerife. Since it was released, Chicharrero de corazón has served to promote the capital of Tenerife and its carnival.

=== Carnival House ===
The Casa del Carnaval or Carnival House is a museum dedicated to this emblematic party located in Santa Cruz de Tenerife and inaugurated in 2017. The venue has two exhibition areas; One for temporary exhibitions and also used as an auditorium, and another for permanent exhibitions, in which the carnival queen's costumes of each year stand out, the original carnival posters, thematic videos of the festival's history, touch screens and Glasses of virtual reality, etc.

In addition, the museum also has a costume shop, makeup, masks and wigs, and also has a gift shop and merchandising with souvenirs inspired by the Carnival of Santa Cruz de Tenerife.

== Contests ==
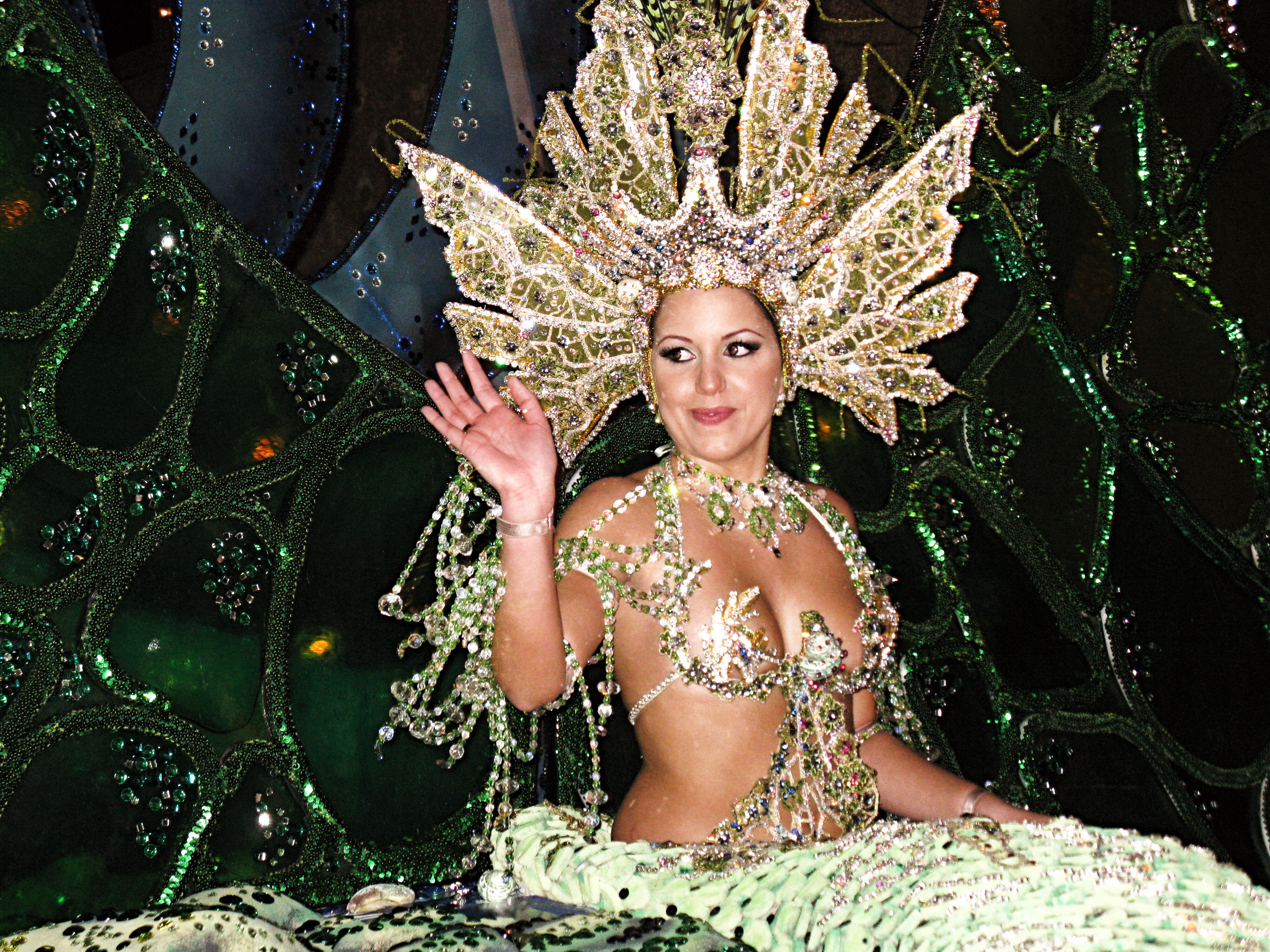
Carnival Queen of Santa Cruz de Tenerife 2009.

- Adult Murgas Contest: The main contest in the Carnival, where murgas sing the best of their repertoire; the audience camps at the box office to get good seats
- Kids' Murgas Contest: A younger version of the adult murgas contest, in which participants are under 18 years
- Music groups: Groups perform Caribbean musical rhythms
- Groups of the Third Age: Oriented toward Canary Island folklore (the "third age")
- Rondalla and Cluster Lyric Contest: Held in the Teatro Guimerá or Auditorio de Tenerife, the contest is a cultural part of the Carnival interpreting Spanish poetry, opera and zarzuela (Spanish opera).
- Adult Choreography Competition: Amateurs mount choreography as if for a ballet
- Kid's Choreography Competition: Children's version of the adult choreography contest
- Adult Comparsas: Awards presentation and choreography on stage
- Kid's Comparsas: Children's version of the adult comparsas
- Rhythm and Harmony: Where the comparasas demonstrates its talent, parading and dancing to the beat of the batucada on the Avenida Anaga
- Competition floats
- The Song of Laughter (La canción de la Risa): Since 2005, its purpose is to reward the song and staging more fun created for the occasion. Held at the Teatro Guimerá, its first edition was won by Los Hijos de Buda with an ironic song about the Spanish royal family.

== Twin ==
The carnival the main festival in the city of Santa Cruz de Tenerife, has motivated both the city and the carnival itself is twinned with some cities where large Carnival celebrations are held, including;

- Cádiz, Spain: Since 1984, the cities of Cádiz and Santa Cruz de Tenerife are twinned, for whose main purpose is the Carnival of Cádiz with the Santa Cruz shares historical ties. Later in 2014, the institutions of both carnivals were also twinned.
- Rio de Janeiro, Brazil: Since 1984, Santa Cruz is twinned with the city of Rio de Janeiro by the special bond between the two carnivals.
- Nice, France: Since 1989, this famous for its carnival city is also twinned with Santa Cruz de Tenerife.

In addition, it is expected that the Santa Cruz and its carnival twin with other cities where large Carnival celebrations are held, including: New Orleans (United States), Venezia (Italy), Aalborg (Denmark) and Barranquilla (Colombia).
