= Music of the Canary Islands =

The music of the Canary Islands reflects its cultural heritage. The islands used to be inhabited by the Guanches which are related to Berbers; they mixed with Spaniards, who live on the islands now. A variant of Jota is popular, as is Latin music, which has left its mark in the form of the timple guitar. There has been a strong connection with Cuban music, Venezuelan, Puerto Rican, and other Caribbean countries both through commerce and migration.

Popular dances from the Canary Islands include:

- Isas
- Tajaraste
  - It probably inspired the Canary dance which became popular all over Europe in the late 16th and early 17th century.
- Baile del Candil
- Baile de Cintas
- Danza de Enanos
- El Santo Domingo
- Tanganillo
- Folias
- Malagueña

Of these, the Isas, a local variation of Jota, are the best-known and most characteristic of the Canary Islands. They are graceful music, with much variation between islands. In some places, a captain leads the dance and organizes others in a chain as the dance grows more and more complex.

Rondalla arrangements are very common. Instruments include charangas, timples (similar to a cavaquinho / ukulele), castanets, panderetas, lauds and guitars. A peculiar ensemble in El Hierro island is made of pito herreño players (a wooden transverse flute) and drums. Some ritual dances in Tenerife island are led by a tabor pipe player. Joyful music for carnival lies to a big extent on brass bands and Latin American patterns.

The chácaras are a type of castanets used in the Canary Islands of La Gomera and El Hierro.

== Canary musicians ==
- Pedro Guerra
- Rosana
- Valentina la de Sabinosa
- Cruz Cafuné
