= TV Canaria 2 =

Televisión Canaria 2
- Country: Spain

Programming
- Picture format: 576i (SDTV)

Ownership
- Sister channels: TV Canaria; TVCi

History
- Launched: 30 May 2006; 19 years ago
- Closed: 31 July 2012; 13 years ago

Links
- Website: www.tvcanariados.com

Availability

Terrestrial
- Analogue: Canary Islands only

TV Canaria 2 was a TDT-exclusive television channel in the Canary Islands.

The channel was an autonomous television network owned by Televisión Canaria. TV Canaria 2 mainly broadcasts programmes such as documentary, cultural programmes and news programmes. The principal place of TV Canaria 2 is located in Santa Cruz de Tenerife.

It started broadcasting on 30 May 2006, Canary Islands Day, but was shut down on 31 July 2012 as a cost-cutting measure from RTVC.
