= Super Chicha =

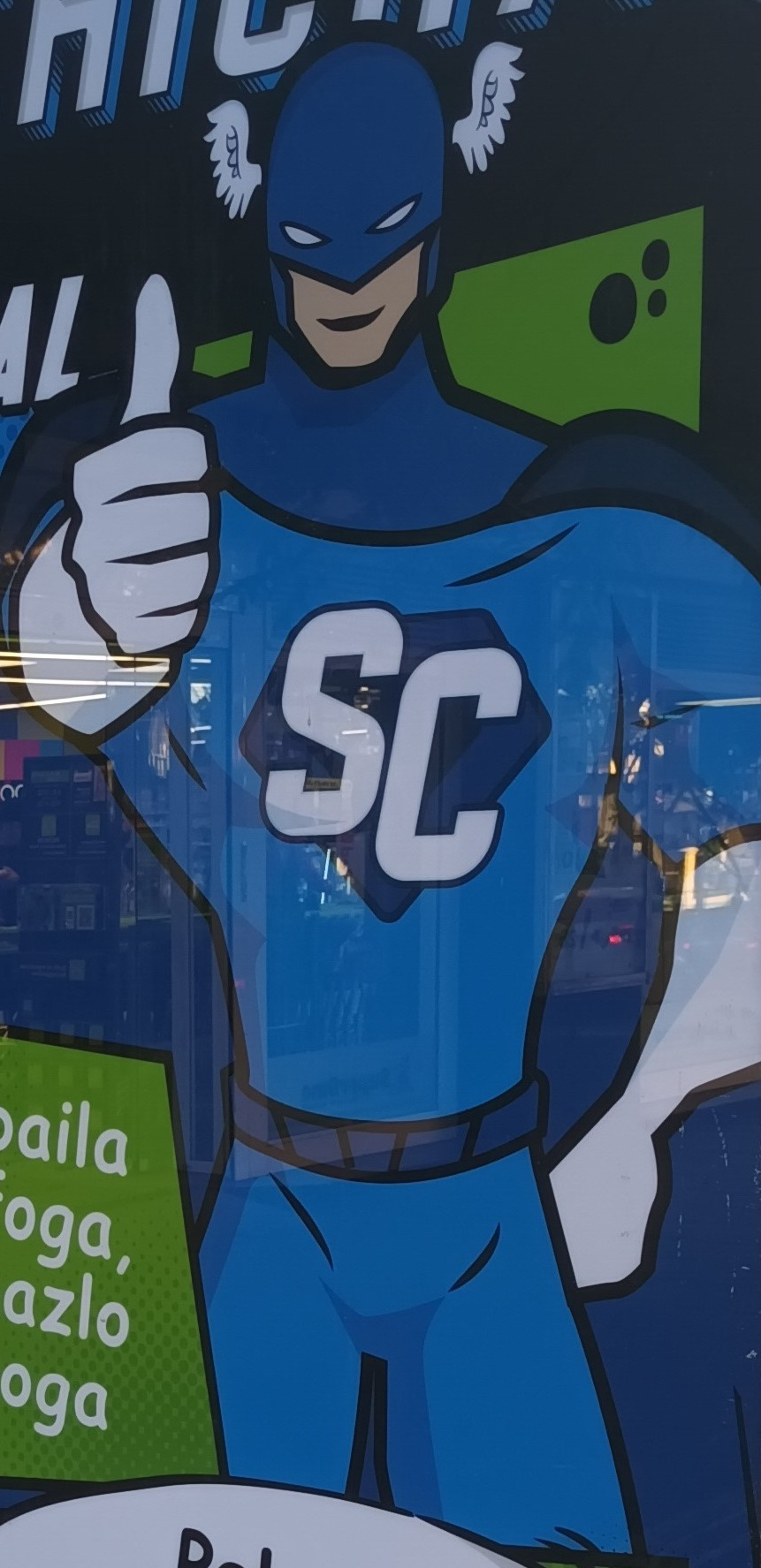
- Advertising panel located in the city of Santa Cruz de Tenerife where you can see an image of Super Chicha.

Publication information
- Publisher: Carnival of Santa Cruz de Tenerife
- First appearance: Carnival of Santa Cruz de Tenerife (February 1999)
- Created by: Guillermo Afonso

Super Chicha is a fictional character created by designer Guillermo Afonso for the Carnival of Santa Cruz de Tenerife in 1999, when the carnival was devoted to comic books and a patriotic superhero of Tenerife (Canary Islands, Spain) was created. It was dubbed "Super Chicha" i.e. "Super Chicharrero" (Chicharrero popular is the adjective of the inhabitants of the city of Santa Cruz de Tenerife). To create that character inspired Captain America.

== History ==
By building the carnival scene in 1999, a giant statue of Super Chicha located in the center of the stage accompanied a smaller sculpture of Lara Croft and other superheroes of the comic world was created. He served as a backdrop to the huge picture wall that mimicked the page of a comic book, and a Super Chicha punching and shield in the other hand seemed to be coming out of it.

Super Chicha wears a blue mask with white wings between the temples, and the word "Sch" on the forehead, blue chest and white gloves, the rest of the costume is blue, with white boots. Super Chicha carries a circular shield, the shield has the colors and shape of the flag of Tenerife, i.e. blue background topped with a cross in the form of white blades.

Today, Super Chicha remains one of the most beloved characters of the Carnival of Santa Cruz de Tenerife. During Carnival of the year 2017, the disguise that used the members of the murga Los Chinchosos was precisely of Super Chicha. For its part, an image of the superhero once again presided over the stage of the 2024 carnival, facing a figure of King Kong.

== See also ==
- Carnival of Santa Cruz de Tenerife
- Chicharrero
