= Maldito Ramírez =

Canarian singer, songwriter and dancer

Maldito Ramirez
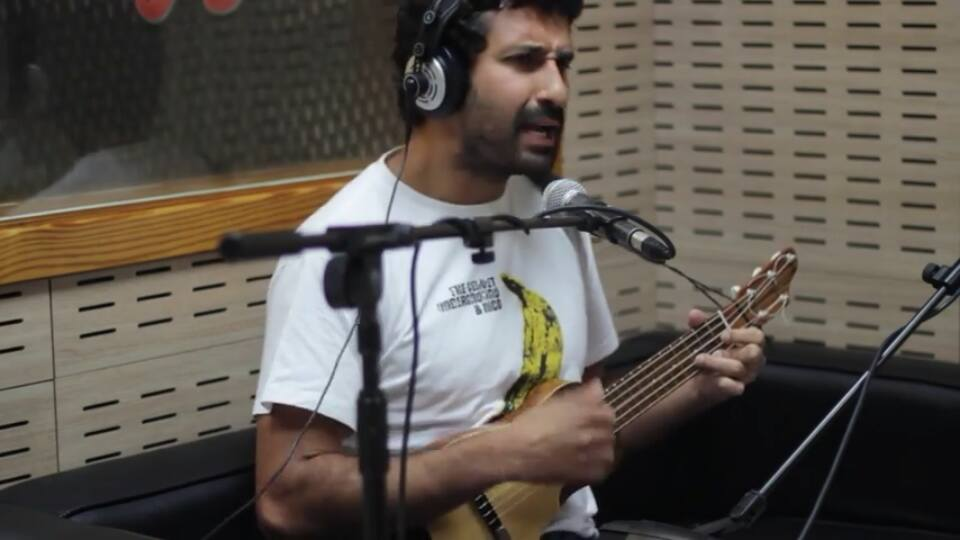

Background information
- Born: Francisco Ramírez; 2 January 1984 (age 41); Las Palmas de Gran Canaria, Canary Islands
- Genres: Folk; Indie
- Occupations: Singer; songwriter; dancer
- Years active: 2014–present

Francisco Ramírez, artistically known as Maldito Ramírez, (born January 2, 1984, Las Palmas de Gran Canaria) is an eclectic Canarian singer-songwriter, between indie and fresh Canarian folk marked to the rhythm of timple.

== Biography ==
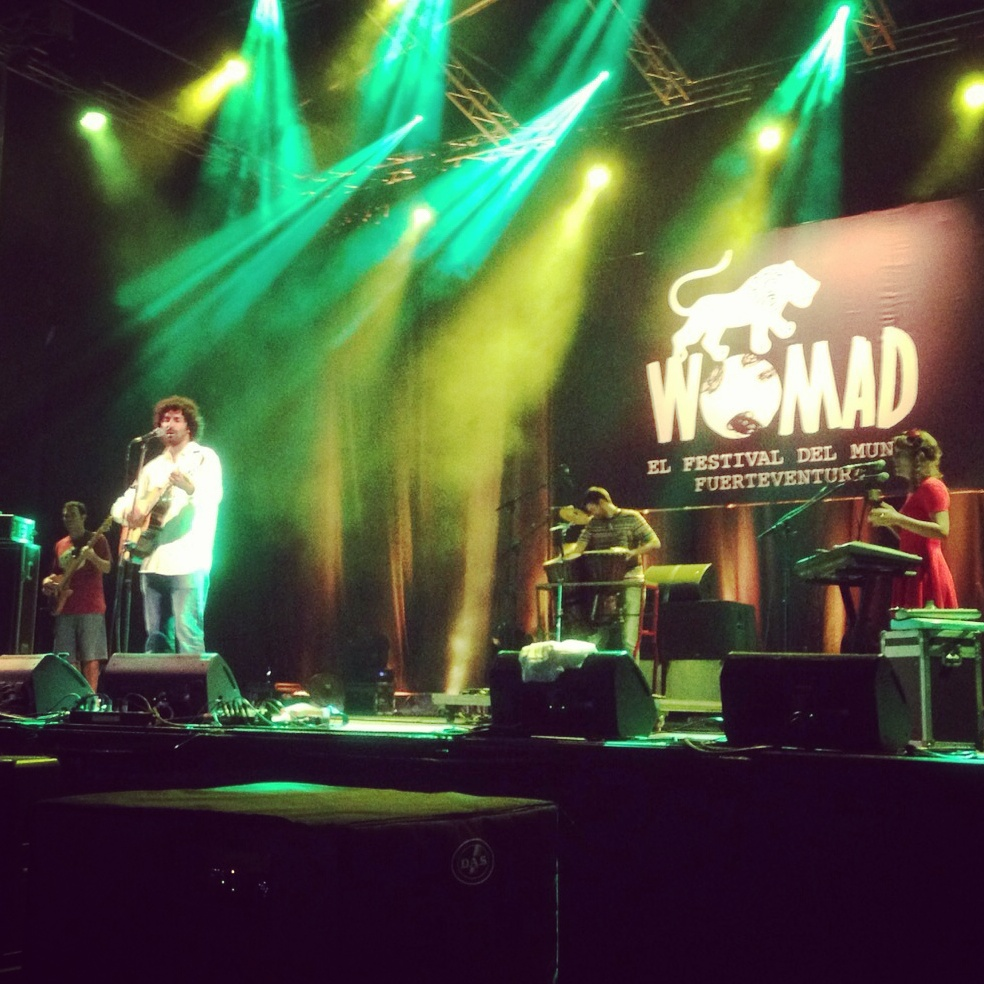
Maldito Ramírez at the WOMAD in 2015

He was born on January 2, 1984, in Las Palmas de Gran Canaria. He lived between the capital of Gran Canaria and the Salinetas. In his adolescence he was in a tribute group to Rage Against the Machine, developing his artistic side from an early age.

He studied psychology at the Universidad Pontificia de Salamanca. He is a reference in the Canary Islands as a psychologist specialized in addiction and sexual therapy. He spent a decade living outside the Canary Islands, having a tour of the Peninsula, the Netherlands, Chile, Brazil and Argentina, where he was steeped in different musical styles along with experiences that inspired him for his musical creations.

== Career ==
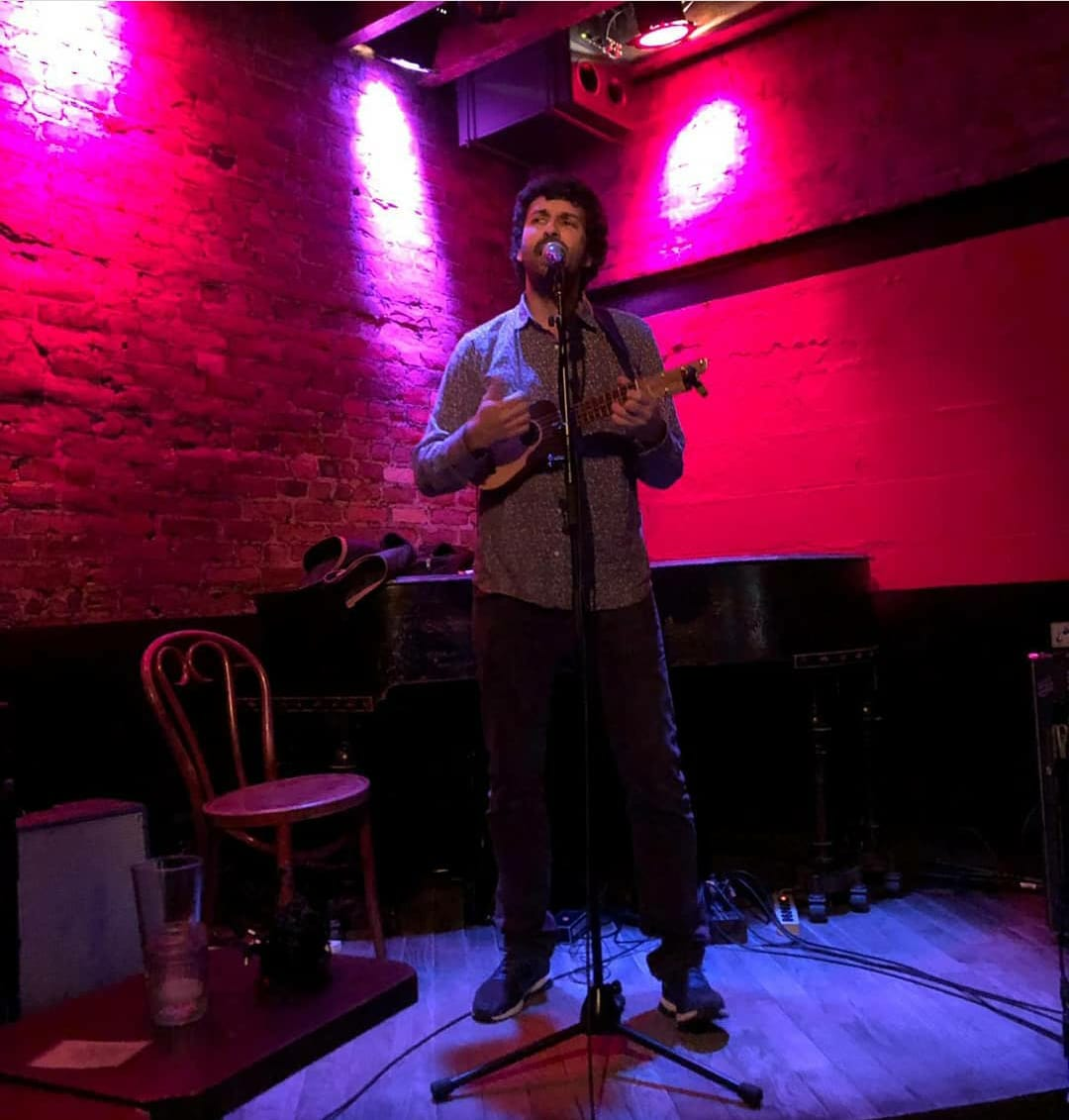
Maldito Ramírez at the Rockwood Music Hall in New York City

Maldito Ramírez released his debut album, Jack Barba , in July 2014. This album opens the doors for him to local circuit festivals (such as the Bioagaete festival, where he has performed on various occasions and NoSoloRock) and international (WOMAD).

Some of his songs also become part of the B.S.O of the documentary Maresía.

In July 2016, he released his second album, Turquesa . He has even made it to the top 40 list of ClickandRoll in October 2016, with the single Searching a mulata, which reaches the first position .

He has given concerts on the PlayaViva route in the capital coast, and has many performances between the strings of his timple in both the Canary Islands and the Peninsula. In 2017 he performed at the Lava Circular festival in El Hierro. He has performed on various occasions at the Bioagaete festival. He has even performed at Rockwood Music Hall in New York City.

=== Discography ===
- Jack Barba (2014)
- Turquesa (2016)
- Tuno Indio (2019)

=== Singles ===
- En el Infierno (2014)
- Vuelve a darle al on (2016)
