= Radio Televisión Canaria =

Regional television broadcaster of the Canary Islands

- Country: Spain
- Availability: Global
- Founded: 1999
- Headquarters: Santa Cruz de Tenerife
- Broadcast area: Canary Islands
- Official website: https://rtvc.es/

The Radio Televisión Canaria (RTVC) is the Canary Islands regional public radio and television broadcaster, based in Santa Cruz de Tenerife. It is currently managed by the 2015 Canary Islands autonomy law.

In 2018, a political crisis nearly lead to its disappearance. The new law regulating it was approved in the same year.

== Channels ==
=== Television ===
Logo	Channel	Start date
	Televisión Canaria	21 August 1999
	Televisión Canaria Internacional	1 May 2001

=== Radio ===
Logo	Channel	Start date
	Canarias Radio	30 May 2008 (Day of the Canary Islands)

== See also ==
- FORTA
