= Maria Rozman =

Journalist

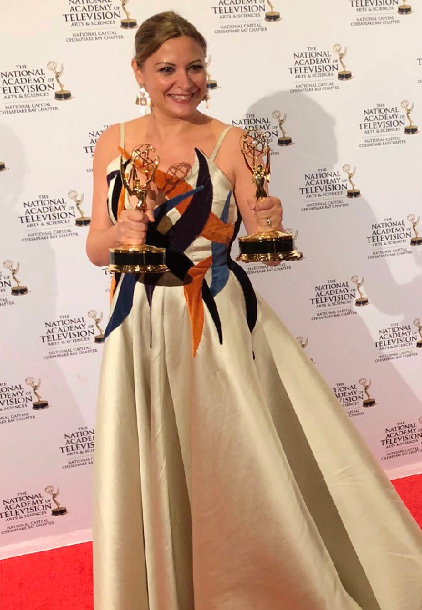
- Born: March 18; Santa Cruz de Tenerife, Canary Islands, Spain
- Occupation: Senior Director

Maria Rozman (born March 18; Santa Cruz de Tenerife, Canary Islands) is currently Senior Director of News at Spectrum Noticias, NY, 11 time Emmy winner, and formerly, News Director of Telemundo Washington DC.

== Biography ==
Rozman attended the University of La Laguna in Tenerife, where she studied law. She holds a bachelor's degree in Science of Communications and Arts in Business as well.

Rozman was named KDEN's news anchor and executive producer for the TV show Noticiero Telemundo Denver. She had been a news anchor/executive producer in Denver and worked at Univision until 2009. She also served as the Spanish program director at the Ohio Center for Broadcasting, a radio and television broadcasting school.

She also worked for CNN Español, where she was nominated for a National Emmy Award. Before that, she was a news director and anchor at Telemundo Denver, as well as a Univision news anchor in Denver. She interviewed U.S. President Barack Obama in 2012 and 2013 as part of the Administration's outreach to Hispanic voters, making her the only Spaniard to interview a sitting U.S. president twice.

In 2018, Rozman was the forerunner of the founding parties of her hometown, Santa Cruz de Tenerife. In 2019, she was one of the presenters at the Gala of Choice of the Queen of Carnival of Santa Cruz de Tenerife.

Currently, she works as a commentator on news related to the United States on Televisión Canaria. Since 2022, she has been the director of Atlántico Televisión, the first regional private television network in the Canary Islands.
