= Day of the Canary Islands =

Annual 30 May celebration

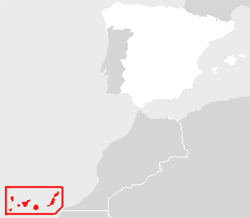
- Location of the Canary Islands with respect to the rest of Spain
- Official name: Día de Canarias
- Also called: Canary Islands' Day
- Observed by: Canary Islands, Spain
- Significance: Anniversary of the first session of the Parliament of the Canary Islands
- Celebrations: Festivities including typical Canarian sports, music, food and culture
- Date: 30 May
- Next time: 30 May 2026
- Frequency: annual

The Day of the Canary Islands (Spanish: Día de Canarias) is celebrated annually on 30 May. It is a public holiday in the Spanish autonomous community of the Canary Islands.

The day was chosen as the anniversary of the first session of the Parliament of the Canary Islands, held on 30 May 1983.

Celebrations generally include cultural activities and private gatherings celebrating all things Canarian, including traditional food, sport and music.

== History ==
The Statute of Autonomy of the Canary Islands was published on 10 August 1982. This law, just like all of the Statutes of Autonomy of the autonomous communities of Spain, recognises the right of the Canary Islands to a degree of self-government within the Kingdom of Spain and under its Constitution.

This form of regional autonomy is enacted through a regional legislature (in this case the Parliament of the Canary Islands), a regional executive (in this case the Government of the Canary Islands) and a High Court of Justice within the judicial system of Spain. The first session of the Parliament of the Canary Islands, presided by Pedro Guerra Cabrera, was held on 30 May 1983.

== Status ==
The Statute of Autonomy of the Canary Islands recognises the festivity of 30 May as one of its official symbols, together with the flag, the coat of arms and the hymn of the Canary Islands.

== See also ==
- Canary Islands
- Parliament of the Canary Islands
- Canarian cuisine
- Music of the Canary Islands
