= Benito Cabrera =

Spanish timple virtuoso, composer, lyricist, from the Canary Islands

Benito Cabrera Hernández (born 1963 in Venezuela) is a Spanish timple composer and virtuoso from the Canary Islands.

He was born in Venezuela. Although he moved to Lanzarote at a young age, he has spent most of his life in Tenerife, having moved there to study psychology at the University of La Laguna.

He is the author of the official anthem of the Autonomous Community of the Canary Islands, and the author of the song Nube de Hielo (literally "Ice Cloud"), one of the most deeply rooted songs in the canaries.

From 2007 until the end of 2020, Benito Cabrera was musical director the group Los Sabandeños. He was replaced by Israel Espino, for whom Cabrera had served as a mentor.

== Discography ==
- 1991 Concierto de timple
- 1992 Timple y orquesta, con la Orquesta Sinfónica de Tenerife
- 1996 Notas de viaje
- 2000 El color del tiempo
- 2002 Travesías
- Puente del sur

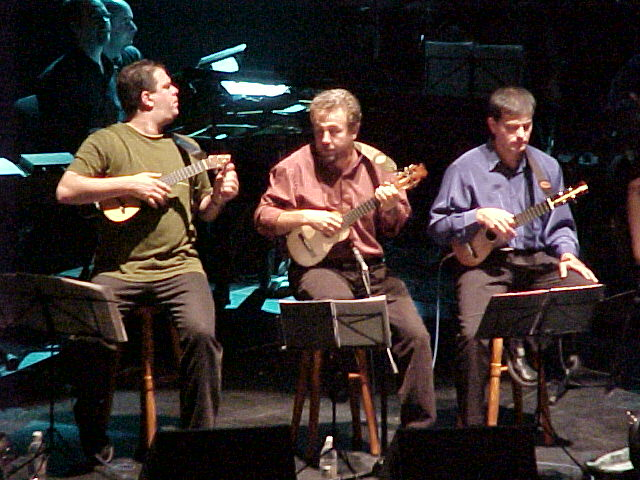
Bdenito Cabarera, Domingo "El Colorao" and José Antonio Ramos, Timples@2000 on 30 April 2001.

== Collaborations ==
Partial List:

- 1999 Castillos de arena, de Taller Canario de Canción
- 1999 Vamos a escuchar al viento, de la Orquesta Sinfónica de Tenerife
- 2001 Teide y Nublo, de Los Sabandeños
- 2001 Étnico, con José Manuel Ramos
- 2001 Timples@2000, con José Antonio Ramos y Domingo Rodríguez Oramas "El Colorao"
