= Centro Internacional de Ferias y Congresos de Tenerife =

Coordinates: 28°27′16″N 16°15′28″W

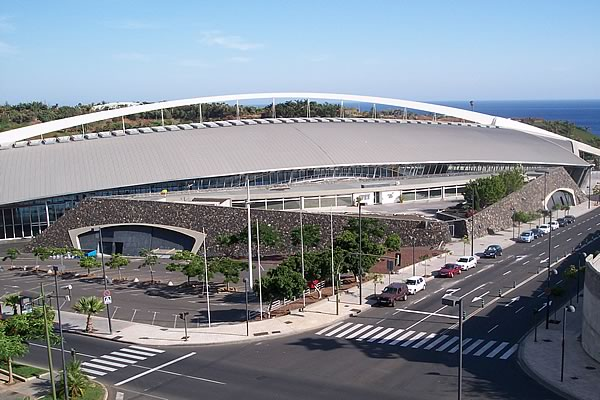
- Interactive map of the Centro Internacional de Ferias y Congresos de Tenerife area

General information
- Type: Event center
- Location: Avenida de la Constitución, 12 38005, Santa Cruze de Tenerife, Canary Island, Spain
- Current tenants: World Trade Center Tenerife, Carnival of Santa Cruz de Tenerife
- Opened: May 1996

Technical details
- Grounds: 40,000 square meters

Design and construction
- Architect: Santiago Calatrava

Website
- recintoferialdetenerife.com

The Tenerife International Centre for Trade Fairs and Congresses (Canary island, Spain), also known as "The Fair Recint" ("Recinto Ferial") was opened in May 1996. The building, covers an area exceeding 40,000 square meters in the sea front of Santa Cruz de Tenerife. Is in close proximity to other venues such as the Parque Marítimo César Manrique, the Auditorio de Tenerife and the Palmetum. The Great Hall, located on the top floor, took a total of 12,000 square meters, making it the largest covered space in the Canary Islands. This building is also the headquarters of the World Trade Center Tenerife.

The complex was designed by architect and engineer Santiago Calatrava is configured as a multipurpose building that can host major fairs, exhibitions and conferences that take place on the island of Tenerife. After its opening in it have developed all kinds of events: trade shows (food, computers, agriculture, recreation, etc.), Music concerts, contests and gala carnival, congresses, seminars, art exhibitions, TV shows, fashion, and a multitude of activities.

== The building ==
The Fair Recint, located on Avenida de la Constitución, Cabo Llanos (expanding neighborhood of Santa Cruz), is divided into three zones: The Great Hall, The Zocalo Building and Annex Building:

- The Great Hall, located on the top floor, took a total of 12,000 square meters, making it the largest covered space in the Canary Islands. This room, which in turn is the main complex is 190 meters long, 70 wide and about 20 meters in height designed in glass, iron and concrete. The maximum capacity reaches 15,000 people. Also on this floor is the cafeteria building.
- Zócalo Building is the place for the development of congresses. It holds a total of 334 people. Located on the lower floor, which also empowers the Multiuses hall od 3,800 square meters.
- Annex Building consists of five plants that houses the offices of the Sociedad de Promoción de Tenerife (SPET) and areas of control techniques of the complex. It is accessible through an arc of 50 meters in length.

== Events and tenants ==
In the building were held in several consecutive years the main events of the Carnival of Santa Cruz de Tenerife in 1996, 1997, 1998, 2006, 2007 and from 2009 to the present.

On March 5, 2015, the building first hosted the Gala de los Premios Cadena Dial in a special commemorating the 25th anniversary of the radio station. Previously done in the near Auditorio de Tenerife. Among the artists who gathered in this gala include: Alejandro Sanz, Amaia Montero, Ana Guerra, Antonio Orozco, Axel, Camila, Carlos Vives, Dani Martín, David Bisbal, David Bustamante, David DeMaría, Dvicio, El Barrio, Ha*ash, Hombres G, Laura Pausini, Malú, Manolo García, Manuel Carrasco, Marta Sánchez, Melendi, Merche, Miguel Bosé, Revólver, Roko, Salvador Beltrán, Sergio Dalma, Tiziano Ferro y Vanesa Martín.

== Gallery ==
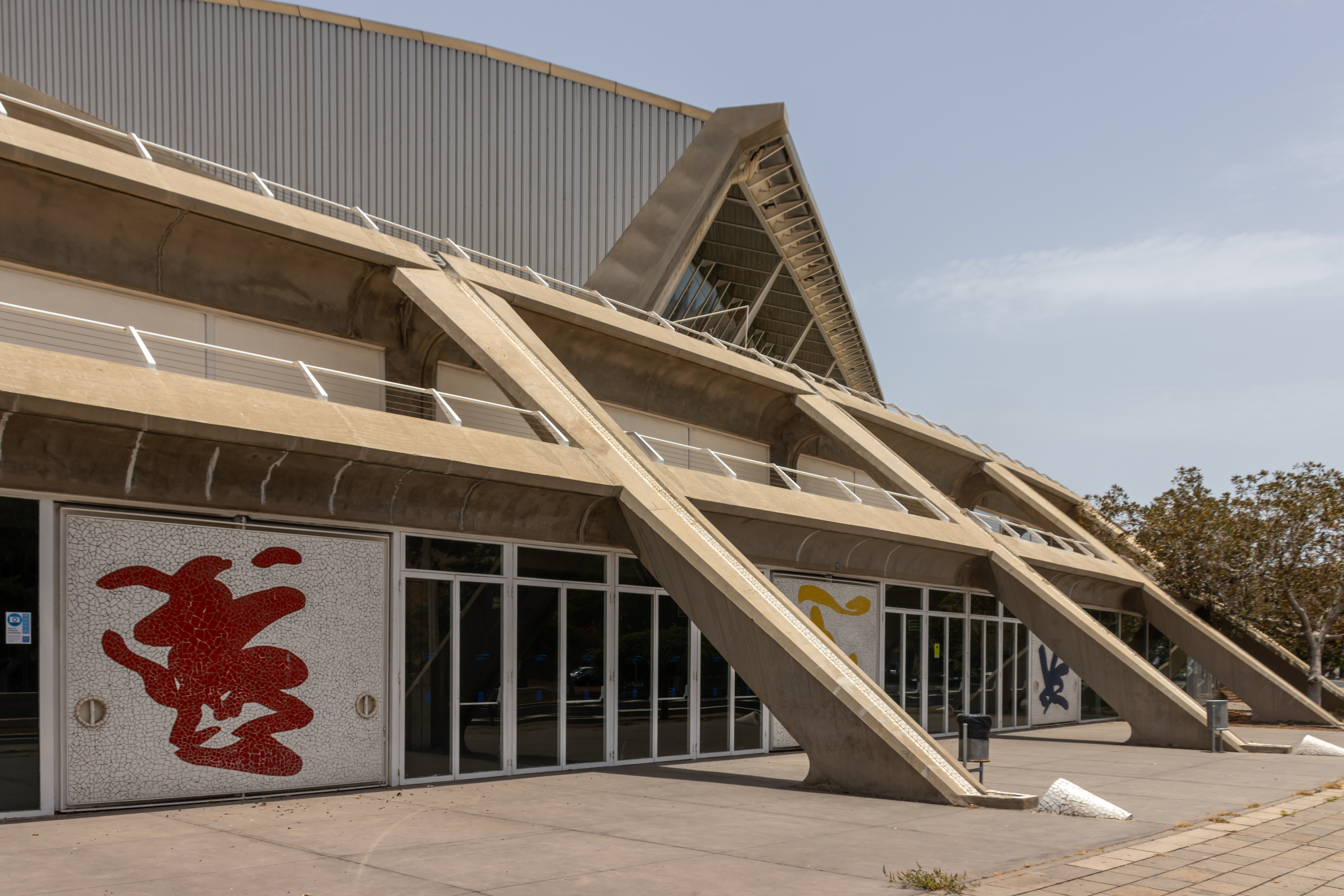
Building in 2020

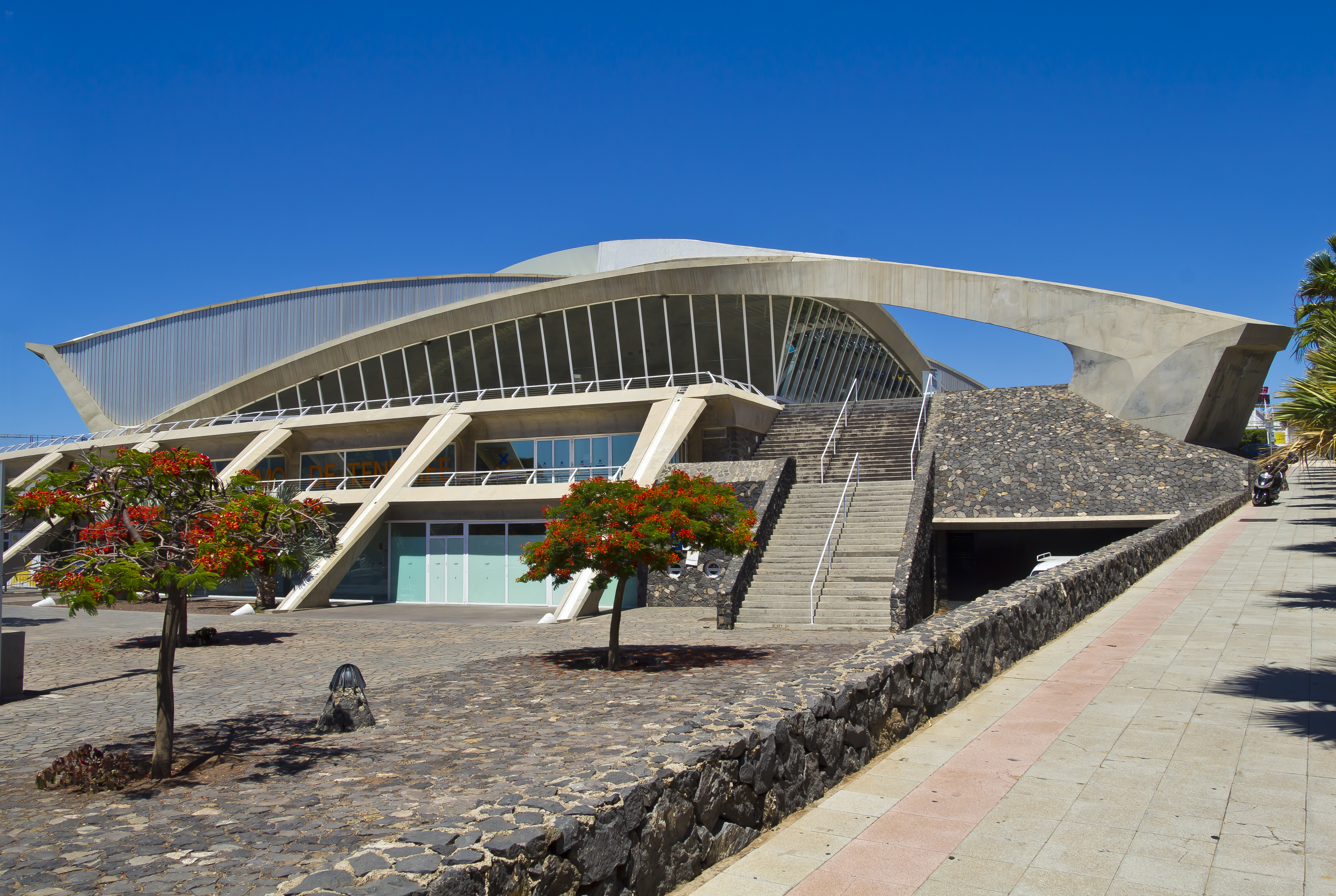
Building 2012

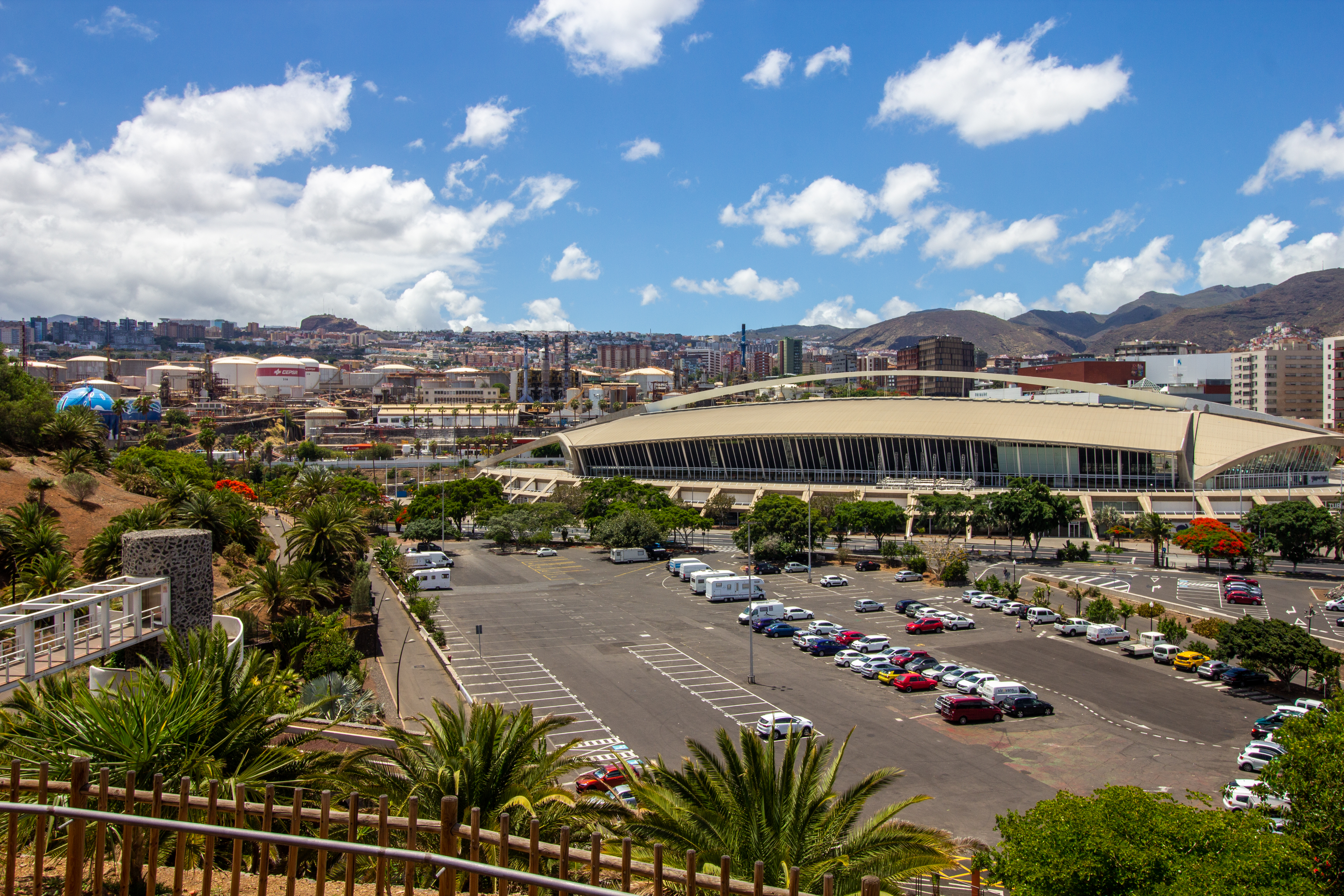
Building and parking lot in 2019
