= Chicharrero =

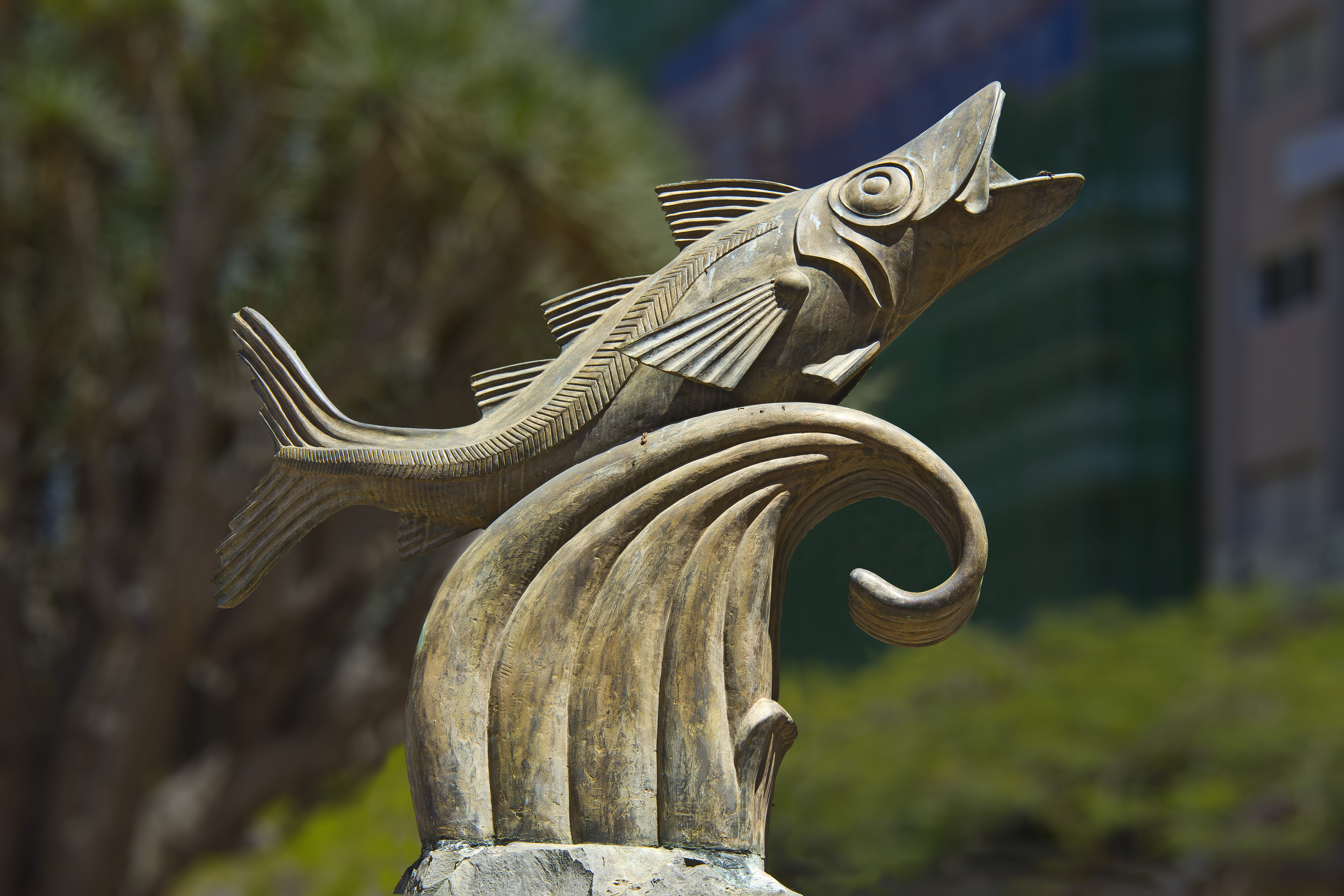
"The Chicharro Sculpture" in Santa Cruz de Tenerife

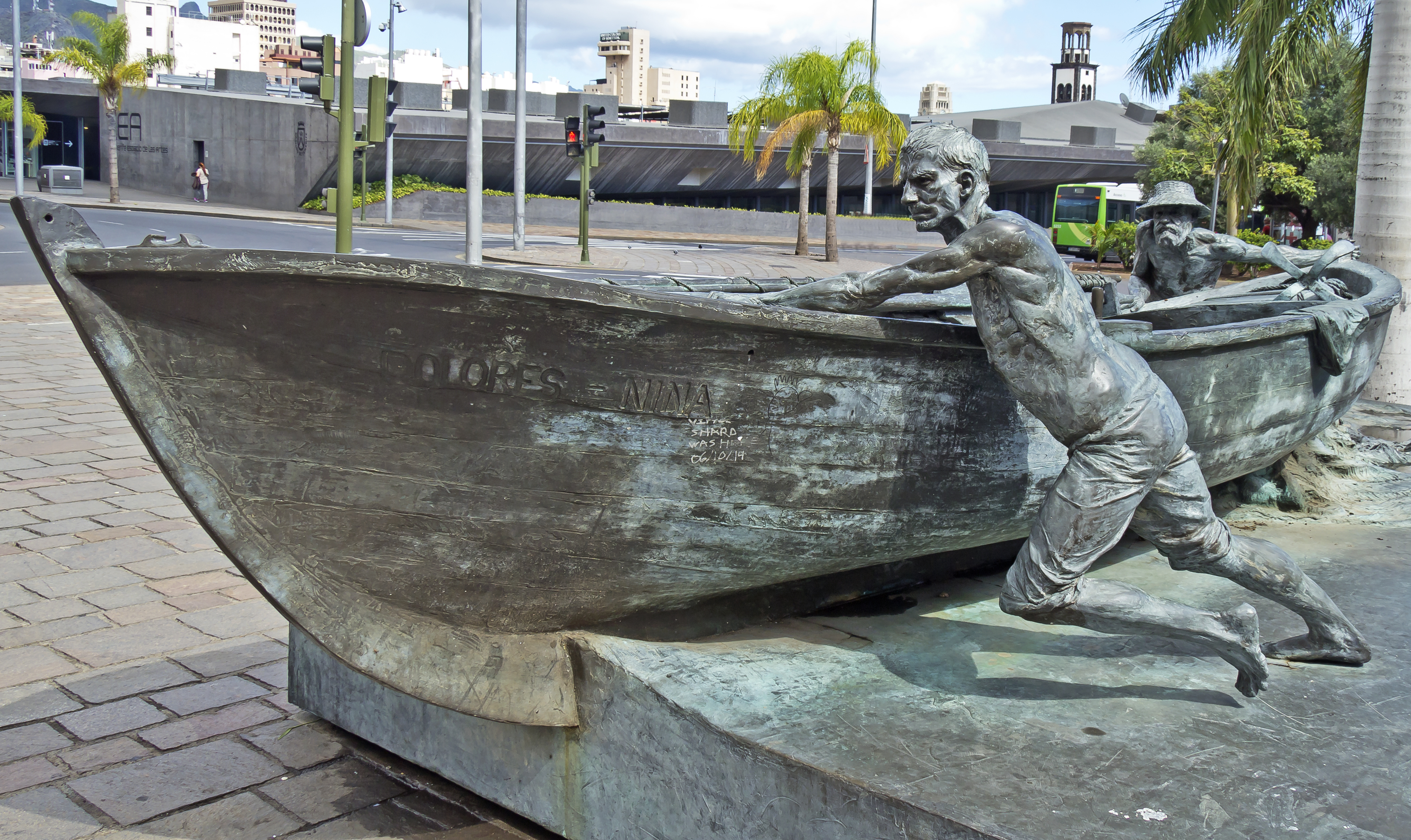
Sculptural complex called Homenaje al Chicharrero located outside Mercado de Nuestra Señora de África in Santa Cruz de Tenerife.

Chicharrero is a name given to the inhabitants of the island of Tenerife, in the Canary Islands. Originally, it was the name given to the inhabitants of the city Santa Cruz de Tenerife by inhabitants of neighbouring San Cristóbal de La Laguna in reference to the former eating the cheap fish chicharro. The term "chicharrero" may refer to people from Tenerife, but also to behaviour, dishes and drinks typical for people from Tenerife.

== The Chicharrero song ==
A popular carnival song is "Chicharrero de Corazón" the chorus of which goes something like this:

"Chicharrero, chicharrero, chicharrero de corazón. Salta a la calle y dale al tambor que el carnaval ya empezó."

Which roughly translated to English is:

"Chicharrero, chicharrero, chicharrero at heart. Hit the street and bang the drum, because Carnival has begun."

Some versions will replace the word empezó with llegó, which changes the translation to "because Carnival has arrived."

Like many drinking songs, versions are just as abundant as ways to create drinks on the vacation paradise of Tenerife.

The song is a variation on the Chilean music group "Mala Junta"'s song "Chileno de corazón."

== See also ==
- Super Chicha
