= The Chicharro Sculpture =

Bronze sculpture of a horse mackerel

Coordinates: 28.4676°N 16.2508°W

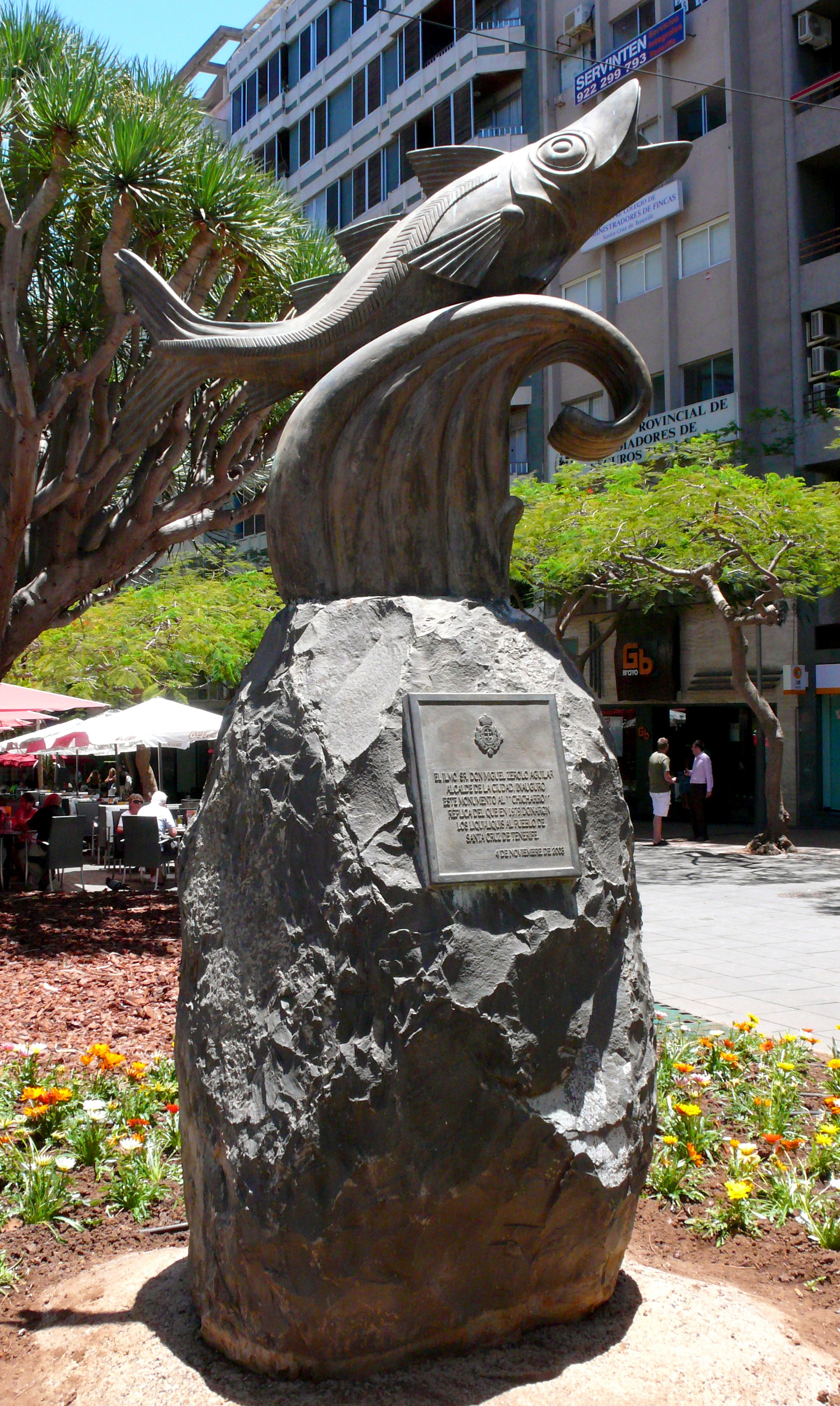
The Chicharro Sculpture

The Chicharro Sculpture or Allegorical sculpture the Chicharro it is a bronze sculpture of a horse mackerel (Trachurus trachurus), located in the city of Santa Cruz de Tenerife (Canary Islands, Spain), which has become one of its most beloved symbols.

Originally the sculpture was donated to the city by the Venezuelan Cultural Association's "Liqui-Liquis" and the city of Santa Cruz and the island of Tenerife gift. He settled in 1979 in a place that was later called Square of Chicharro.

In 2000 the statue was stolen and it was sold in Valencia, where it narrowly escaped being melted for scrap metal. Despite this the original image was found in very bad condition, so the current replica has been created with only preserving the original image of the wave that seems to be jumped by the fish, as this wave was included in the new sculpture.

The current sculpture as above is made from bronze, it weighs approximately 600 kilograms and is located since November 2003 on a basalt stone.

At present, the sculpture is a symbol that gives its name to the inhabitants of the capital and the island; Chicharrero.
