= Nube de Hielo =

Canary traditional melody

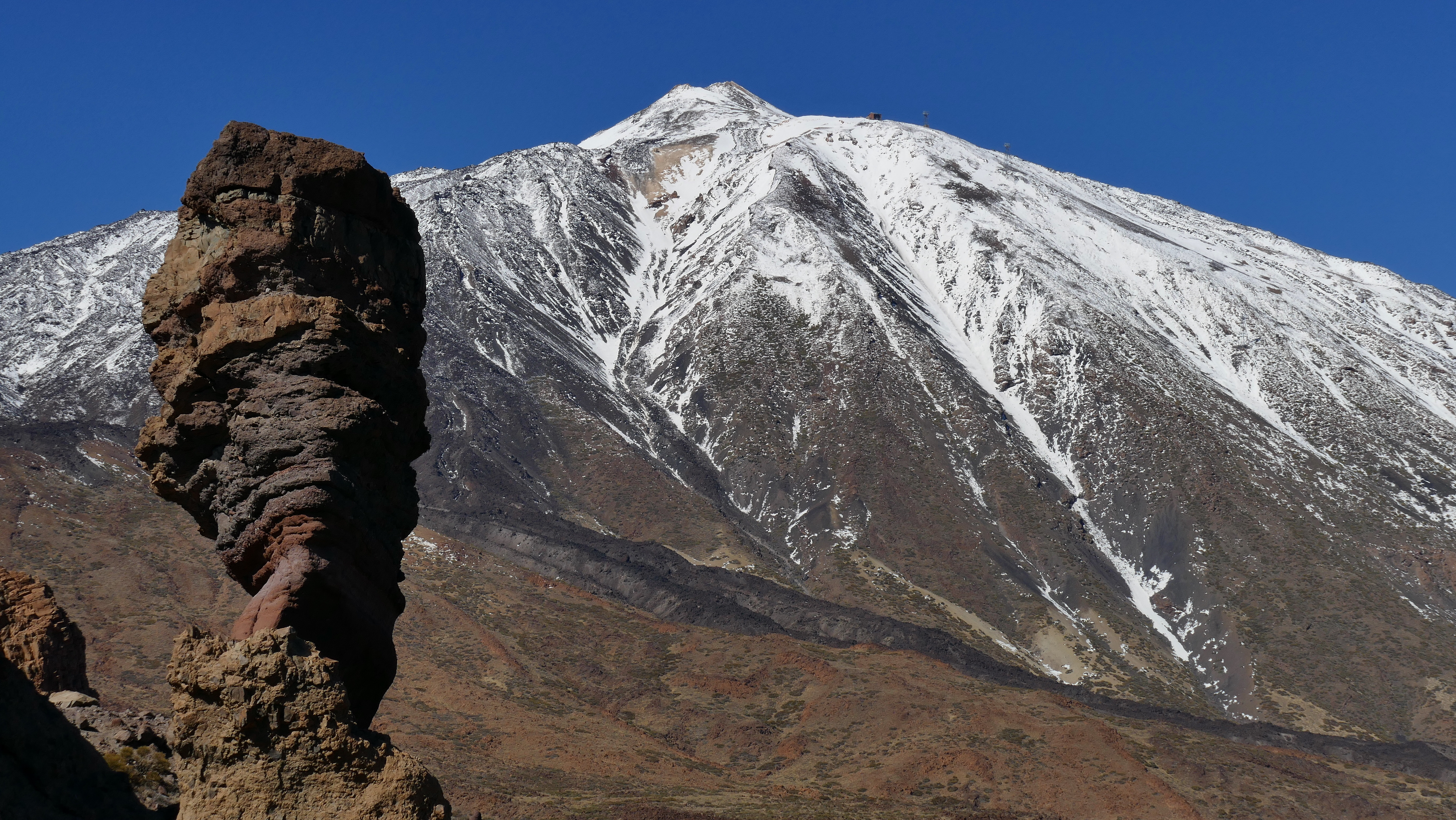
The landscape of Teide was the inspiration for the song.

Nube de Hielo translated as "Ice Cloud" is a traditional melody created by the Canarian composer Benito Cabrera. The song appeared for the first time published on the album «Notas de Viaje» in 1998, and since then it has been covered many times. The Canarians show a great of affection for this song, being deeply rooted in the Canary Islands.

Nube de Hielo is an instrumental melody that has no lyrics really. Although the composer Andrés Molina wrote a letter and Chago Melián is the singer who has sung it more frequently. According to the own Benito Cabrera, the song is inspired by the Teide, especially in the sound of the silence that he found in this place.

The song expresses feelings of isolation, melancholy and nostalgia present in the hearts of the Canaries, which arose after decades of emigration to America, in addition to the sentimentality carried by the peninsulars who emigrated to the islands centuries ago, all of this helping to generate a atmosphere that, as in the case of Portuguese or Galician folklore, impregnated with saudade, constitutes a perceptible background emotionality in Canarian society in very varied ways.

Nube de Hielo was part of the Teide National Park declaration file as a World Heritage Site in 2007.

== Lyrics ==
Te dibujo en un papel, Pintando sombras al mar
Nube que me vio nacer, También me viste marchar
La distancia duele más; si atrás quedo lo mejor
Como un niño sin jugar, como una triste canción

Te dibujo en un papel, y sueño con regresar
Tan cerca te vi ayer, y hoy miro al cielo y no estas

No respira el viento igual, cuando te alejas del sur
Si no tiene olor a sal, la nube no serás tú

Nube de hielo en la cumbre del ancho mar
Nube el silencio que puedes montar
Mi juventud, mi adolescencia, y mi edad de jugar
Tu veras como mi vida se ira

No respira el viento igual, Cuando te alejas del sur
Si no tiene olor a sal, La nube no serás tú

Nube de hielo en la cumbre del ancho mar
Nube el silencio que puedes montar
Mi juventud, mi adolescencia, y mi edad de jugar
Tu veras como mi vida se ira

Nube de hielo en la cumbre del ancho mar
Nube el silencio que puedes montar
Mi juventud, mi adolescencia, y mi edad de jugar
Tu verás como mi vida se irá
Junto al mar mi vida se irá…

Literal English translation

I draw you on paper, painting shadows to the sea
Cloud that saw me born, you also saw me leave
Distance hurts more; if the best is left behind
Like a child without playing, like a sad song

I draw you on a piece of paper, and I dream of returning
I saw you so close yesterday, and today I look at the sky and you're not here

The wind does not breathe the same, when you move away from the south
If it doesn't smell of salt, the cloud won't be you

Cloud of ice on the top of the wide sea
Cloud the silence you can ride
My youth, my adolescence, and my playing age
You will see how my life will go

The wind does not breathe the same, when you move away from the south
If it doesn't smell of salt, the cloud won't be you

Cloud of ice on the top of the wide sea
Cloud the silence you can ride
My youth, my adolescence, and my playing age
You will see how my life will go

Cloud of ice on the top of the wide sea
Cloud the silence you can ride
My youth, my adolescence, and my playing age
You will see how my life will go
By the sea my life will go…

== See also ==
=== Other identity ballads ===
- Scarborough Fair, English traditional ballad.
- Waltzing Matilda, Australian traditional folk song.
