= Valentina la de Sabinosa =

Spanish singer of Canarian folk music

Valentina Hernández

Valentina Hernández, also known as Valentina la de Sabinosa, (Sabinosa, La Frontera, El Hierro, 1889–1976) was a Spanish singer of Canarian folk music. Thanks to her, music from the island of El Hierro got to be known in the rest of the Canary Islands, and even in the rest of Spain. Valentina was recognized in all of the Canary Islands because of her voice. She helped to popularize traditional songs from El Hierro such as El Baile del Vivo, El Tango Herreño, La Meda, El Conde de Cabras and, specially, El Arrorró Herreño.

For Doña Valentina, ancient culture was the most valuable. Such as she repeated in the refrain of the Baile del Santo song: old people's customs should not be abandoned.

Valentina is considered an iconic figure of Canarian folklore. She was an excellent drum player and singer that used to teach young people the songs and dances of her island. She managed to preserve the musical heritage of her ancestors.

As a side note, she also used to work preparing medicinal baths in Sabinosa's Pozo de la Salud along with her husband Esdras by 1949, and in her village she was famed as a midwife.
