= Coat of arms of the Canary Islands =

Versions
- Emblem
- Armiger: Canary Islands
- Adopted: 1982
- Crest: Spanish Royal Crown
- Shield: Azure, seven islands argent
- Supporters: Dogs, (Presa Canario)
- Motto: Océano (Spanish: Ocean)

The coat of arms of the Canary Islands is the central device of the flag of the Canary Islands, Spain. The designs were made official by the Statute of Autonomy of the Canarian Autonomous Community (Organic Law 10/82) on 10 August 1982.

The shield shows seven argent islands, representing the Canary Islands of volcanic origin in the Atlantic Ocean. Atop the shield is the royal crown of Spain. The shield is supported by dogs from which the islands may derive their name, possibly from the Latin term Insula Canaria, meaning Island of the Dogs, a name applied originally only to the island of Gran Canaria. It is thought that the dense population of an endemic breed of large and fierce dogs, like the Presa Canario, was the characteristic that most struck the few ancient Romans who established contact with the islands by the sea.

The motto is Oceano.

== Controversy over the dogs ==
In recent times there has been a controversy over the representation of the dog (Presa Canario) in the shield. This fact motivated the Government of the Canary Islands to remove the two dogs from the official forms and public buildings, although they have been kept in the coat of arms of Canary Islands.

Popularly attributed the Canary Islands name is derived from the Presa Canario, although under a law in force in the Canary Islands since 1991, the dog is the natural symbol of Gran Canaria along with the cactus. For this reason, critics of the current shield argue that it only represents the island of Gran Canaria, and not the entire archipelago.

== See also ==
- Flag of the Canary Islands
