= Canary dance =

Type of dance

The Canary dance (known as Canario in Italian sources, Canarie in French ones) is a Renaissance dance inspired by an indigenous dance and song of the Canary Islands, Spain (probably the one known as Tajaraste) that became popular all over Europe in the late 16th and early 17th century. It is mentioned in dance manuals from France and Italy, and is mentioned in sources from Spain and England, as well, including in plays by William Shakespeare.

== Choreography ==
The dance, which is most often choreographed for a single couple, has been characterized as "a fiery wooing dance" with either Canary origins or at least a Canary flavor from its "rapid heel-and-toe stamps" and distinctive music. It was also historically called frogs legs, because it is an energetic dance that features jumps, stamping of the feet, and violent movement, accompanied by music with syncopated rhythms.

While there are choreographies for the canario as a stand-alone dance in the dancing manuals of Fabritio Caroso, Cesare Negri, and Thoinot Arbeau, it most frequently appears as a section of a larger dance or suite of dances. Several Baroque composers (notably J.S. Bach) used the distinctive rhythm of the canary in a few pieces, such as the gigue of the French Suite in C Minor, and it also appears in one of the Goldberg Variations (Variation 7).

== Literature ==
- Arbeau, Thoinot. Orchesography. (Orchésographie, 1589.) Translated by Mary S. Evans and edited by Julia Sutton. New York: Dover, 1967.
- Brissenden, Alan. Shakespeare and the Dance. Atlantic Highlands, NJ: Humanities Press, 1981. ISBN 978-0391018105 (1st edition), ISBN 978-1852730833 (2nd edition).
- Caroso, Fabritio. Courtly Dance of the Renaissance: A New Translation and Edition of the “Nobiltà di Dame” (1600). Edited and translated by Julia Sutton. New York: Dover Publications, 1986, 1995.
- Cohen, Selma Jeanne, ed. International Encyclopedia of Dance: A Project of Dance Perspectives Foundation, Inc. 6 vols. New York: Oxford University Press, 1998. ISBN 0-391-01810-8 (1st edition), ISBN 978-0195173697 (2nd edition).
- Kendall, G. Yvonne. “Le Gratie d'Amore 1602 by Cesare Negri: Translation and Commentary.” PhD diss., Stanford University, 1985.
- Negri, Cesare. Le Gratie d'Amore. Milan, 1602.
