= Tajaraste =

Music genre and type of dance

Tajaraste (From Berber TAJARAST) is combined music and dance typical of the Canary Islands, Spain. It is specific to the islands of Tenerife and La Gomera. Essentially an upbeat, happy and syncopated rhythm, danced in pairs accompanied by tambourines, drums and small castanet-like instruments called chácaras.

The dance is collective in nature and its choreography changes from island to island. The differences arise from the originating island.

Tajarastes arrived in the European courts in the 16th century. Its songs are from ancient romances rising back to after the conquest of the Canary Islands. They describe stories, miracles and forbidden loves. It probably inspired the Canary dance which became popular all over Europe in the late 16th and early 17th century.
