= Flag of the Canary Islands =

Spanish regional flag

Official flag of the Autonomous Community of the Canary Islands. Flag ratio: 2:3

Version with Coat of Arms (not legislated). Flag ratio: 2:3

Flag of the Maritime Province of the Canary Islands, which is based on the current Flag of Tenerife.

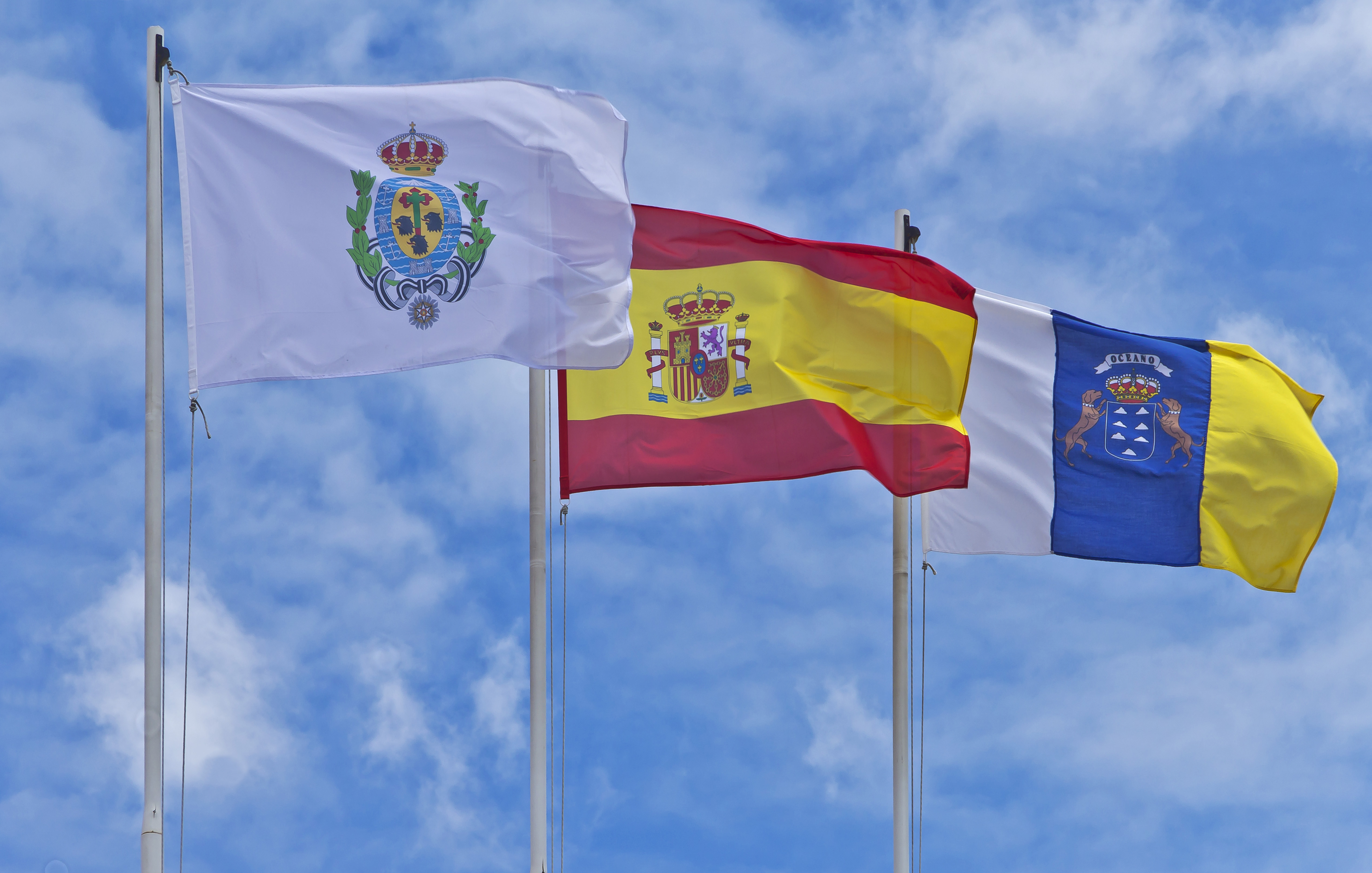
Flags of Santa Cruz de Tenerife, Spain and the Canary Islands

The flag of the Canary Islands, in Spain, is a vertical tricolour of three equal bands of white, blue, and yellow. The state flag includes the coat of arms of the Canary Islands in the central band; the civil flag omits this. The designs were made official by the Statute of Autonomous Community of the Canary Islands (Organic Law 10/82) on 16 August 1982.

== History and meaning ==
The tricolour flag has its origins in the Canarias Libre movement of the 1960s. It was designed by Carmen Sarmiento and her sons Arturo and Jesus Cantero Sarmiento, and first displayed (in paper form) on 8 September 1961. It combined the blue and white colours of the province of Santa Cruz de Tenerife (province of Canary Islands) with the blue and yellow colours of the province of Las Palmas. The two dogs represented on flag's seal centered on the flag are Perro de Presa Canarios, or Canary Catch Dogs, that were first bred on the Canary Islands by ranchers who use them to herd and protect their cattle.

== Color ==
The colors of the flag as specified by the Canarian Government are the following:

	Pantone	CMYK colour model				RGB colour model			Web colors
Color	Identification	C	M	Y	K	R	G	B	HTML code
White*	Not specified	0%	0%	0%	0%	255	255	255	#FFFFFF
Blue	3005	100%	35%	0%	0%	7	104	169	#0768A9
Yellow	7406	0%	20%	100%	0%	255	204	0	#FFCC00

*Assumed to be pure white due to it not being specified exactly.

== Flags of the provinces ==
Flag of Santa Cruz de Tenerife

Flag of Las Palmas

== Island flags ==
Flag of El Hierro

Flag of La Palma

Flag of La Gomera

Flag of Tenerife

Flag of Gran Canaria

Flag of Fuerteventura

Flag of Lanzarote

== See also ==
- Coat of arms of Canary Islands
- Flag of Tenerife
