= Televisión Canaria =

- Country: Spain

Programming
- Picture format: 1080i HDTV

Ownership
- Parent: Radio Televisión Canaria (RTVC)
- Sister channels: Televisión Canaria Internacional

History
- Launched: 21 August 1999; 27 years ago
- Former names: Televisión Pública de Canarias (TVPC)

Links
- Website: Televisión Canaria

Televisión Canaria is a Spanish regional free-to-air television network in the Canary Islands belonging to the regional public broadcaster Radio Televisión Canaria (RTVC). It has two production centers in Las Palmas and Santa Cruz de Tenerife, and has offices in the rest of the Canary Islands, as well as in Madrid . The headquarters and management are located at Santa Cruz de Tenerife.

The channel broadcasts on DTT throughout the Canary Islands. Televisión Canaria also broadcasts an international channel named Televisión Canaria Internacional which broadcasts in the rest of Spain, Europe, North and South America. Formerly TVC also broadcast two more channels: TV Canaria 2 and an online channel named Televisión Canaria Net.

== History ==
Reporting in 2026

The creation of the channel arose in the 1980s with promulgation of the law 8/1984 of the autonomous region of Canaries relating to Broadcasting and Televisión Canaria. The first broadcast was made on the 21 August 1999 under the name Televisión Autonómica de Canarias (TVAC), in 2001 the company adopted the simpler name of Televisión Canaria and the slogan la nuestra. In 2010 the channel launched its HD version.

In 2012 Televisión Canaria faced a financial crisis, in order to solve it was necessary to lay off several workers and close down TV Canaria 2, the TVC's secondary channel.

Since 2012, the channel has faced different processes of administrative changes and interventions by the Canarian Parliament and Government due to problems in the election of its administrative council.

During September 2021, TV Canaria recorded its best audience numbers for the channel's coverage of the volcanic eruption on La Palma, in addition, the channel's signal was used by other media outlets to report on the event.

== Programming ==
Televisión Canaria broadcasts a general programming, which is based on informative programs, contests, local culture, sports, music and typical Canarian festivals.

== Logos and identities ==
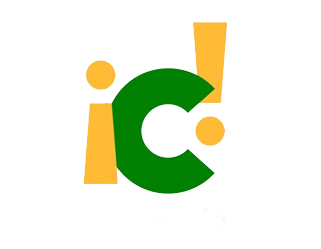
Second logo (2001–2008)

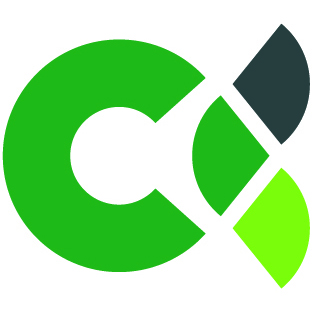
Third logo (2008–2011)
