= Timple =

String instrument

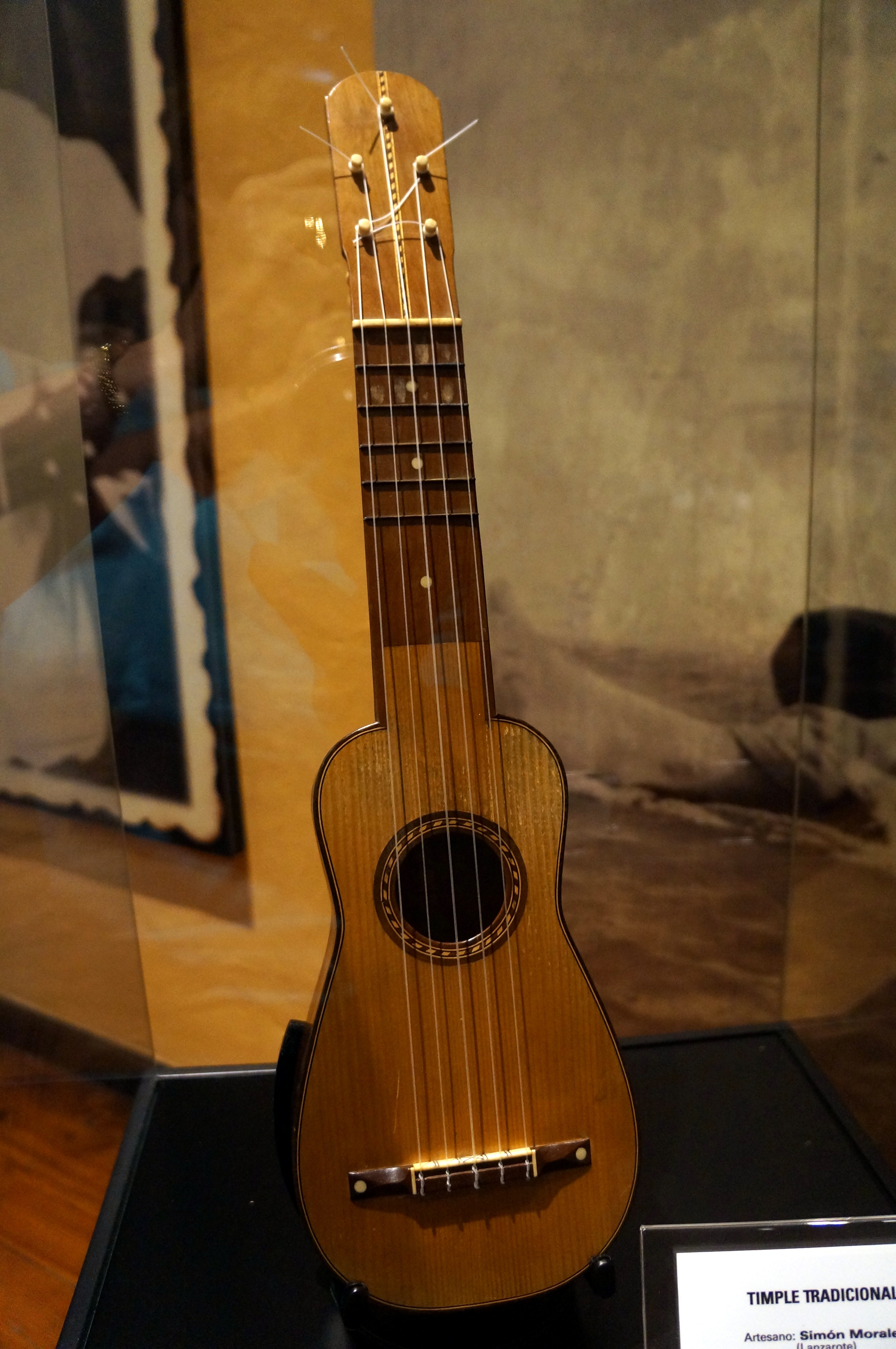
Traditional timple at the Casa Museo Del Timple, Lanzarote, Spain.

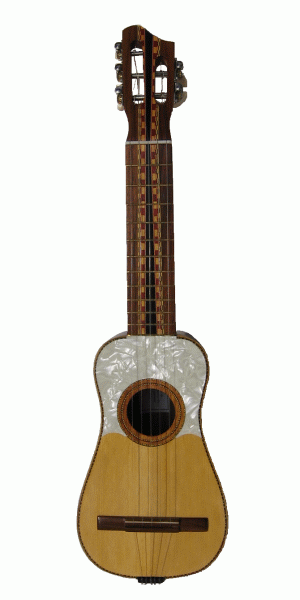
Timple seen from front

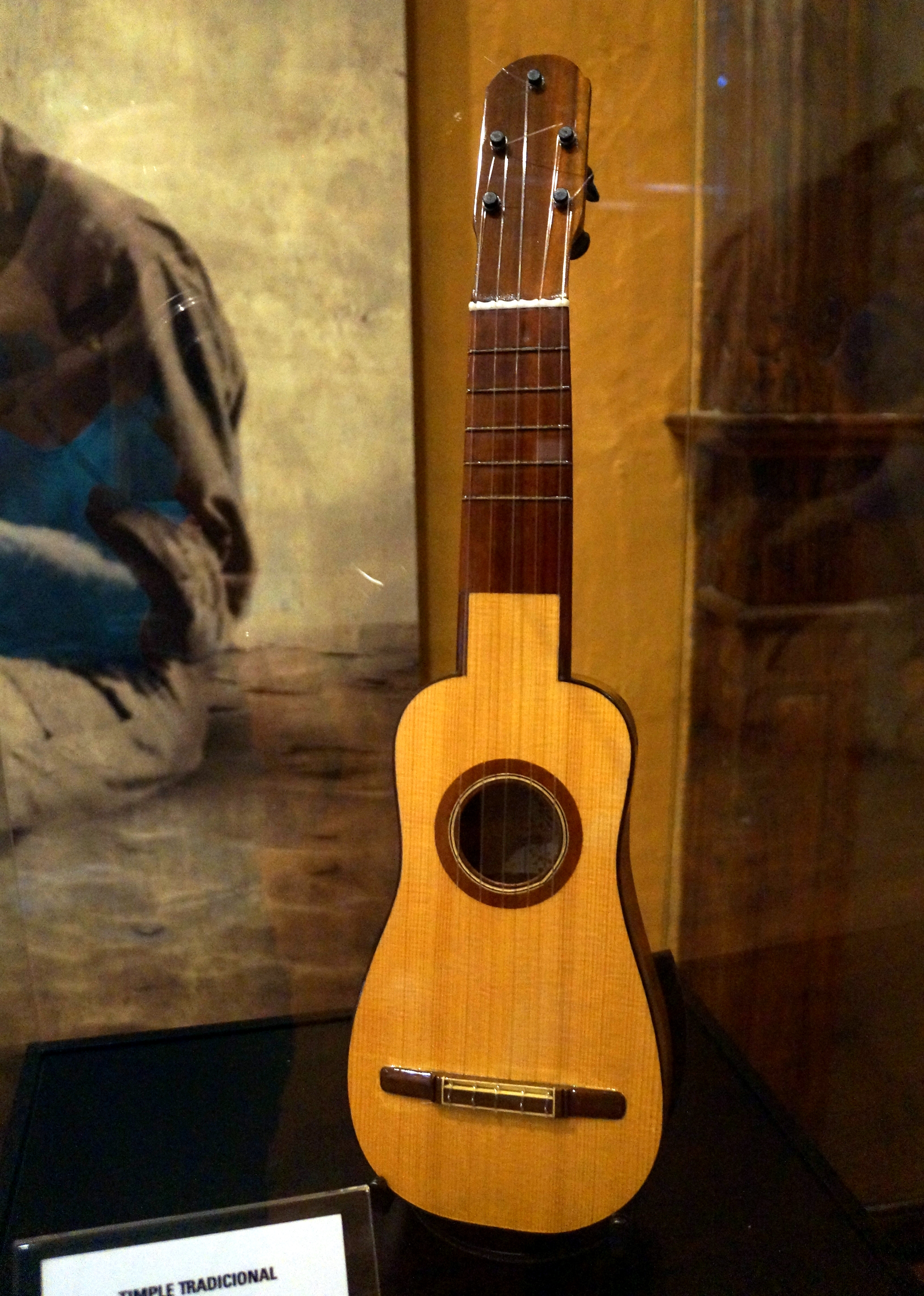
Traditional timple at the Casa Museo Del Timple, Lanzarote, Spain.

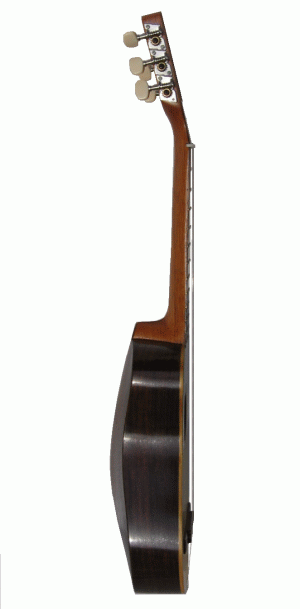
Timple seen from side

The timple is a traditional five-string plucked string instrument of the Canary Islands. It started being manufactured in the 19th century.

In La Palma island and in the north of the island of Tenerife, many timple players omit the first (D) string, in order to play the timple as a four-string ukulele, though this is considered less traditional by players and advocates of the five-string version. The players of the four-string style, in return, say that they are simply playing the timple in the old-fashioned way from before the time when a fifth string was introduced in the late nineteenth or early twentieth century. The common tuning is GCEAD.

Notable timple players (timplistas) are Benito Cabrera (Lanzarote), Germán López (Gran Canaria), José Antonio Ramos, Totoyo Millares, and Pedro Izquierdo (Tenerife).

== See also ==
- Tiple
