= Recreation Gesta July 25 =

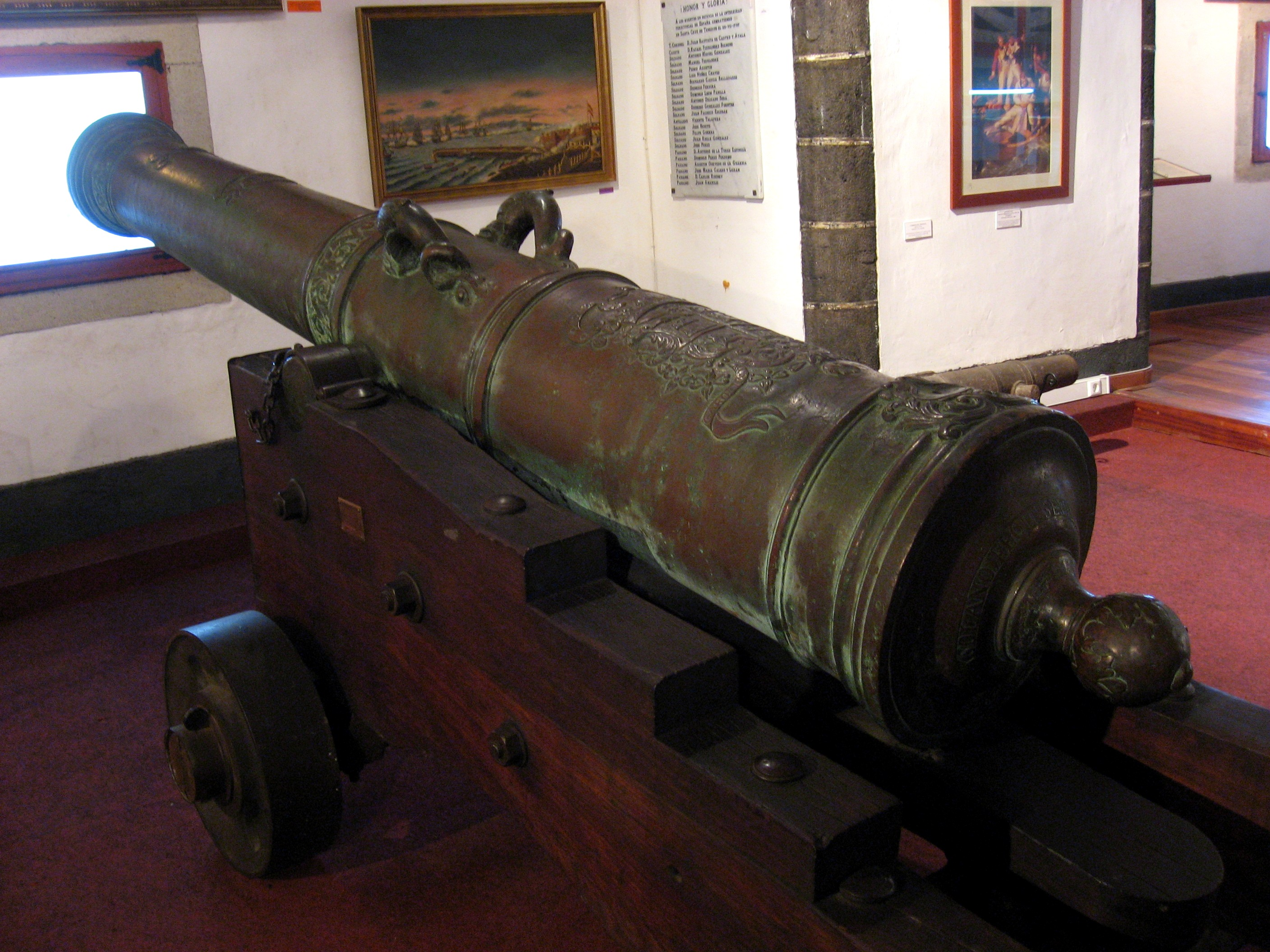
El Tigre, the cannon which reportedly struck Nelson's arm

The Recreation Gesta July 25 (in Spanish: Recreación de la Gesta del 25 de julio) it is a commemoration and historical re-enactment that takes place in the city of Santa Cruz de Tenerife (Canary Islands, Spain) in July. This is a historical representation of Battle of Santa Cruz de Tenerife of 1797.

The current Recreation Gesta began held in 2008 and is organized by the city of Santa Cruz de Tenerife and the Asociación Histórico Cultural Gesta del 25 de julio de 1797. The event also has the support of the Government of the Canary Islands, the municipalities of Santa Cruz de Tenerife and San Cristóbal de La Laguna, Cabildo de Tenerife and the Port Authority of Santa Cruz de Tenerife. Also in this event it has an important and outstanding collaboration the Regional Military Museum of the Canary Islands which it is based in the city.

== Acts ==
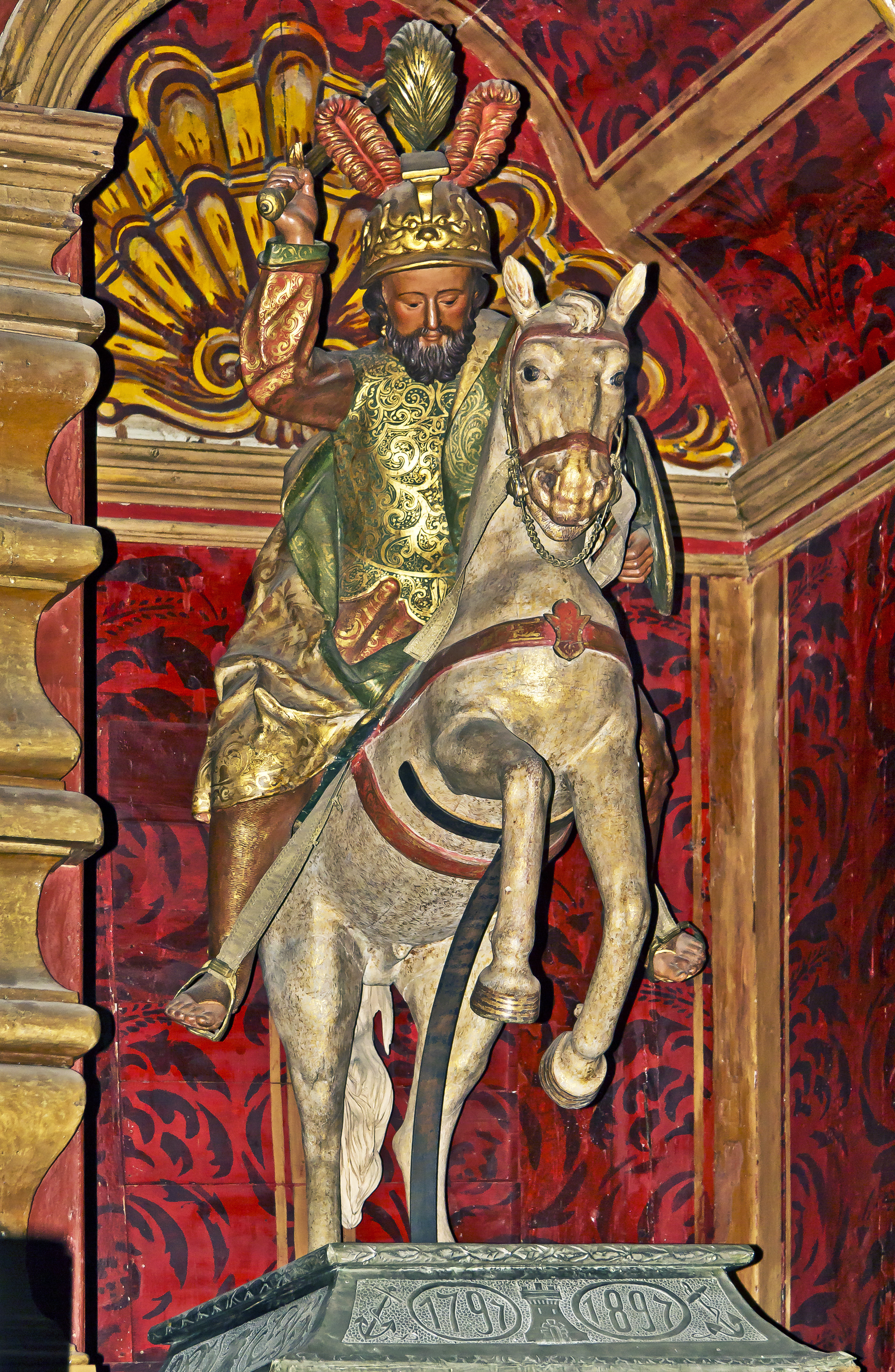
Statue of St. James (patron saint of Santa Cruz de Tenerife) in the Church of the Conception.

This act begins each July 24 with the parade of local troops, in which the First Infantry Battalion of the Canary Islands and the Militias of the neighboring city of San Cristóbal de La Laguna involved. The soldiers, wearing faithful reproductions of uniforms and weapons of the time, start from the Plaza Weyler and walk calle del Castillo until you reach the Plaza de la Candelaria.

On July 25 continue the activities that will recreate the fighting during the landing and in the street, and the final surrender of the troops of Admiral Horatio Nelson. Fighting between Spanish troops, coordinated by Antonio Gutiérrez de Otero y Santayana and British troops, commanded by Admiral Nelson, they are recreated in the same places where they occurred over 218 years ago, i.e. around the Castle of St John the Baptist of Santa Cruz de Tenerife.

Recreation ends on the evening of 25, after holding a religious function in the Parish of Our Lady of Conception, to commemorate the Gesta and patronage of St. James on the city. During this ceremony a wreath is made in the tomb of General Antonio Gutiérrez located in the chapel of St. James in the same church. After this celebration the image of the saint out in procession through the streets of the city.
