= Castle of St John the Baptist =

Cultural property in Santa Cruz de Tenerife, Spain

Coordinates: 28.4554°N 16.2524°W

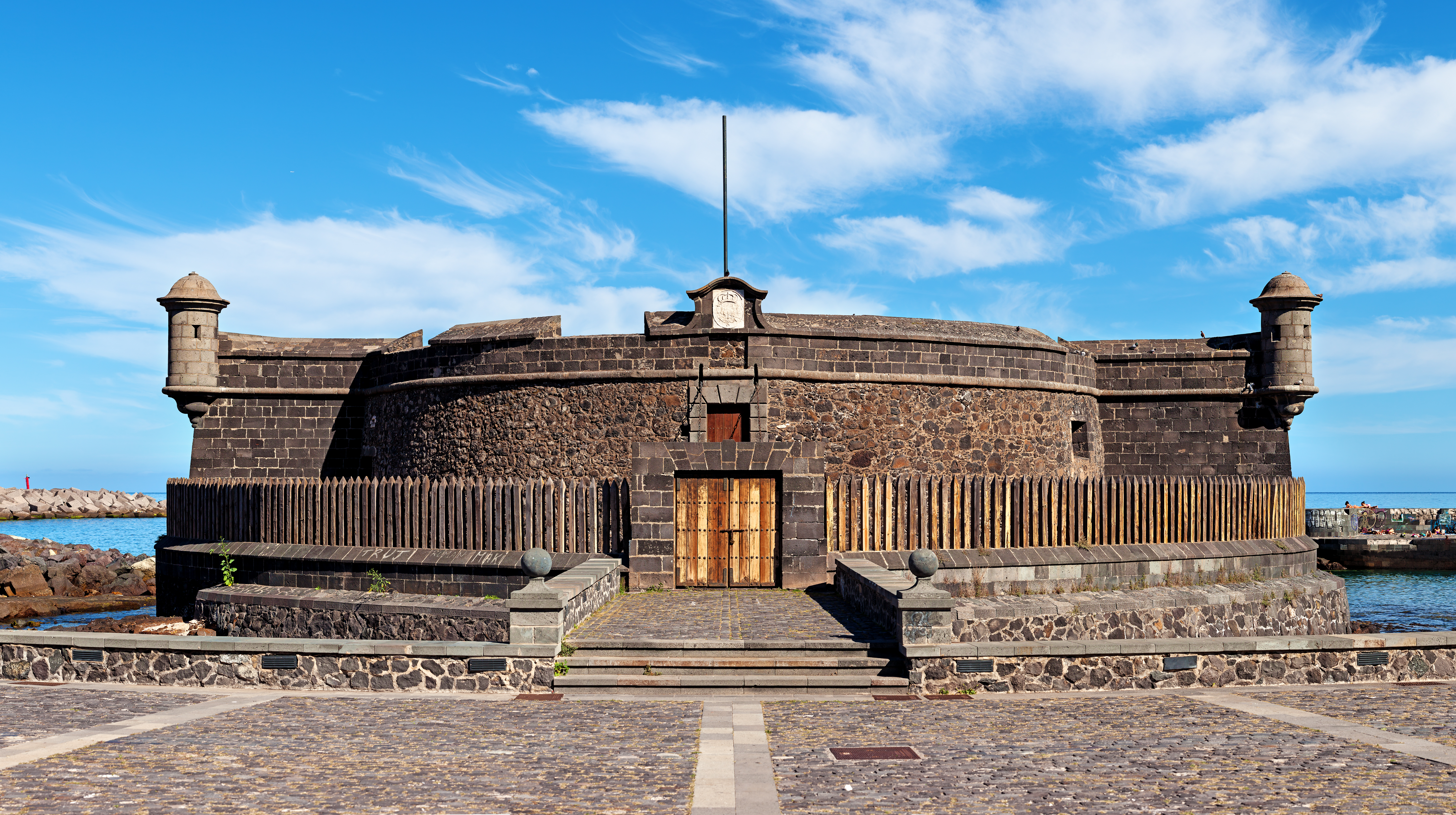
Front view of the fort in 2015

The Castle of St John the Baptist (Spanish: Castillo de San Juan Bautista), also called the Black Castle (Castillo Negro), is a fort on the island of Tenerife in the Canary Islands of Spain. It was the second-most important fort in the defence of Santa Cruz de Tenerife, the island's capital.

It is located in the heart of the capital near the Parque Marítimo César Manrique and behind the Auditorio de Tenerife. Its construction was started in 1641 and completed in 1644. It was later rebuilt in 1765 with the addition of a cylindrical tower facing the sea. It served as a military fort until 1924. It was converted to a military museum in 1948.

In 1684, Charles II of Spain gave the power to appoint the castilian, or warden of the castle, to the Cabildo de Tenerife, the island's governing body. This appointment, along with that of the Castle of San Cristóbal, were coveted by the island's nobility as an honour, but also for two important reasons: it was the most important way to prove their noble status, with a view to entering orders, joining the military or the maestranza de caballería (noble militia), and due to the privileges attached to the position: they were in charge of everything related to health, the port police, granting permits for the entry and exit of the ships, they charged the right to fish, they mediated between the conflicts between fishermen and townsfolk, besides taking care of correspondence and collecting tariffs on salt and flour.

A re-enactment of the Battle of Santa Cruz de Tenerife takes place annually at the fort, in commemoration of the unsuccessful attempt by the British admiral Horatio Nelson to invade the city and the archipelago on 25 July 1797.
