= Antonio Gutiérrez =

Antonio Gutiérrez could refer to:

- Antonio Gutiérrez de la Fuente (1796–1878), president of Peru in 1829
- Antonio Gutiérrez de Humaña, Spanish explorer, member of the Humana and Leyva expedition of 1594 or 1595
- Antonio Gutiérrez Limones (born 1963), Spanish socialist politician
- Antonio Gutiérrez de Otero y Santayana (1729–1799), lieutenant general in the Spanish army
- Antonio Gutiérrez y Ulloa (1771–1831), Spanish colonial administrator
- Antonio Gutiérrez Vegara (born 1951), Spanish trade-unionist, member of the 9th Congress of Deputies (Spain)

== See also ==
- António Guterres (b. 1949), prime minister of Portugal (1995–2002), United Nations secretary-general (since 2017)
- Antoni Gutiérrez Díaz (1929–2006), Spanish (Catalan) physician and communist politician
