= Monument to the Fallen (Santa Cruz de Tenerife) =

Memorial in Spain

Los caídos por Dios y por la patria
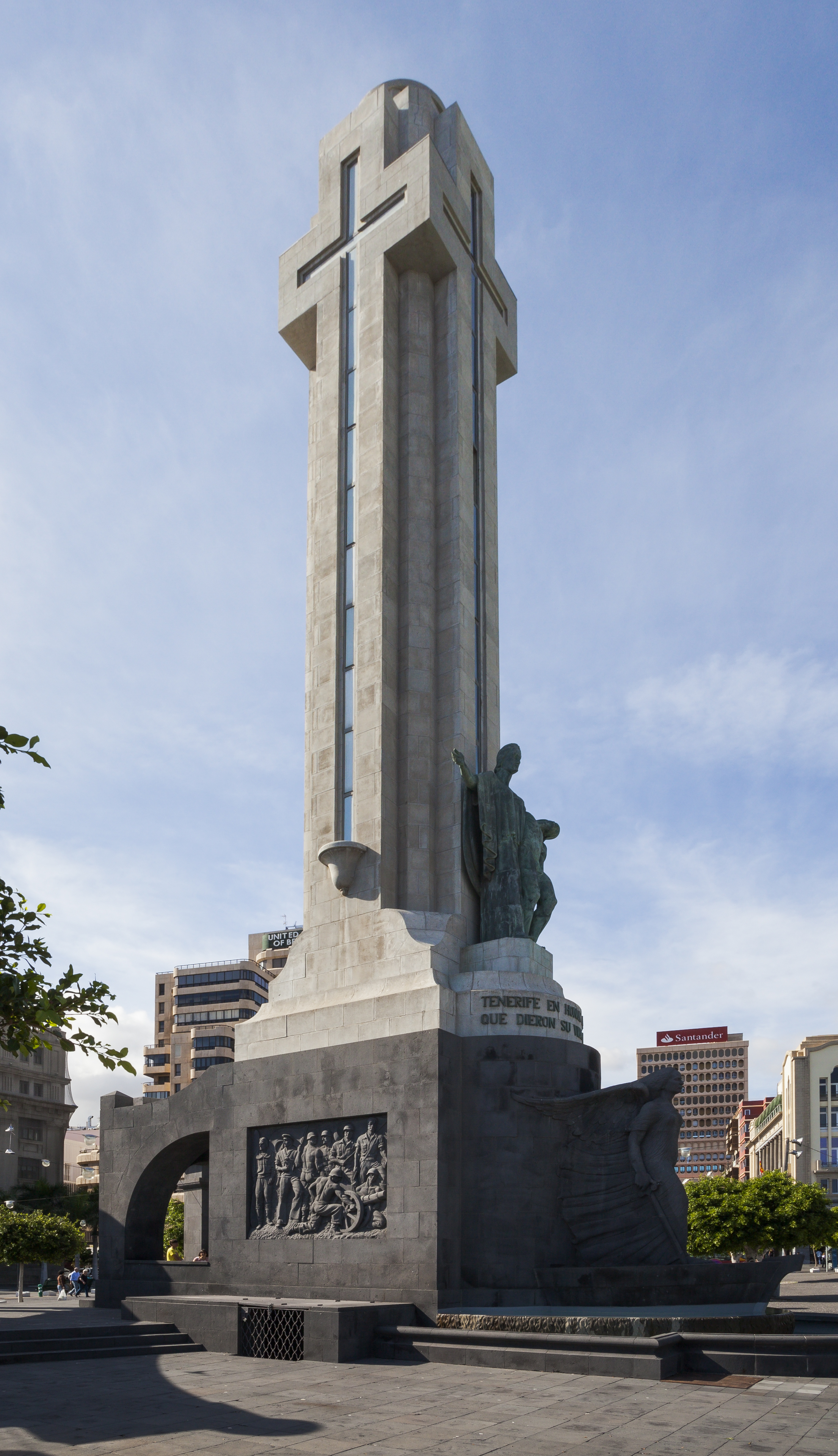
- 28°28′00″N 16°14′50″W
- Location: Plaza de España, Santa Cruz de Tenerife, Spain
- Designer: Tomás Navarro (architect); Enrique Cejas Zaldívar and Alonso Reyes Barroso (sculptures and reliefs)
- Material: Stone, bronze
- Height: 25 m
- Opening date: 17 February 1947
- Dedicated to: Fallen soldiers of the Francoist faction in the Spanish Civil War

The Monument to the Fallen (Spanish: Monumento a los Caídos) is a monument in Plaza de España, near the sea front of Santa Cruz de Tenerife, Spain. It is one of the several erected monuments across the Spanish geography that serve as memorial to the Nationalist victors in the Spanish Civil War.

== History and description ==
The idea of the monument was conceived after the 1936–1939 Civil War and promoted by the Captain General of the Canary Islands Francisco García-Escámez. It was formulated as a "Monument to the Fallen of Santa Cruz de Tenerife in the War of National Liberation" [sic]. The architectural project was authored by Tomás Navarro, while the sculptures are the work of Enrique Cejas Zaldívar and Alonso Reyes Barroso, and it consisted of a 25 m (82 ft) high cross-like obelisk, a basement and a crypt, while incorporating a series of sculptural features. It has four major sculptural elements: an allegory of the Fatherland holding the fallen soldier, a winged female figure representing Victory, and two soldiers wielding a sword, representing the civic and the military value. The sculptures are either made of bronze or basalt. The monument also features some lateral reliefs by Cejas Zaldívar.

It was unveiled on 17 February 1947 during a ceremony attended by García-Escámez; Domingo Pérez Cáceres; Luis Carrero Blanco and the Mayor of Santa Cruz Cándido Luis García Sanjuán.

The building works reportedly made use of forced labour via political prisoners. According to a study commissioned by the local government in 2019, the monument violates the Law of Historical Memory, and it needs to undergo a "resignification" process.
