= Catalina Lercaro =

16th-century Italian-Canarian woman

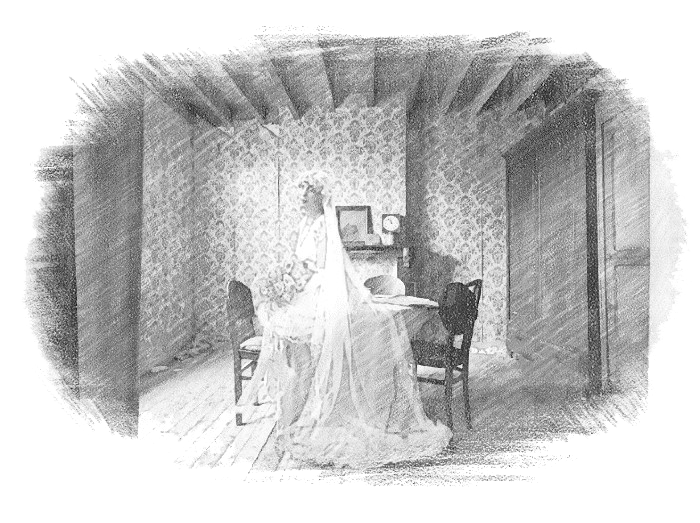
Contemporary representation of the ghost of Catalina Lercaro.

Catalina Lercaro (Catherine Lercaro), 16th century, was an Italian-Canarian woman of the Lercaro family. She was renowned in the city of San Cristóbal de La Laguna (Tenerife, Canary Islands, Spain).

The Lercaro were an important family of Genoese merchants, who were based in Tenerife after the Castilian conquest.

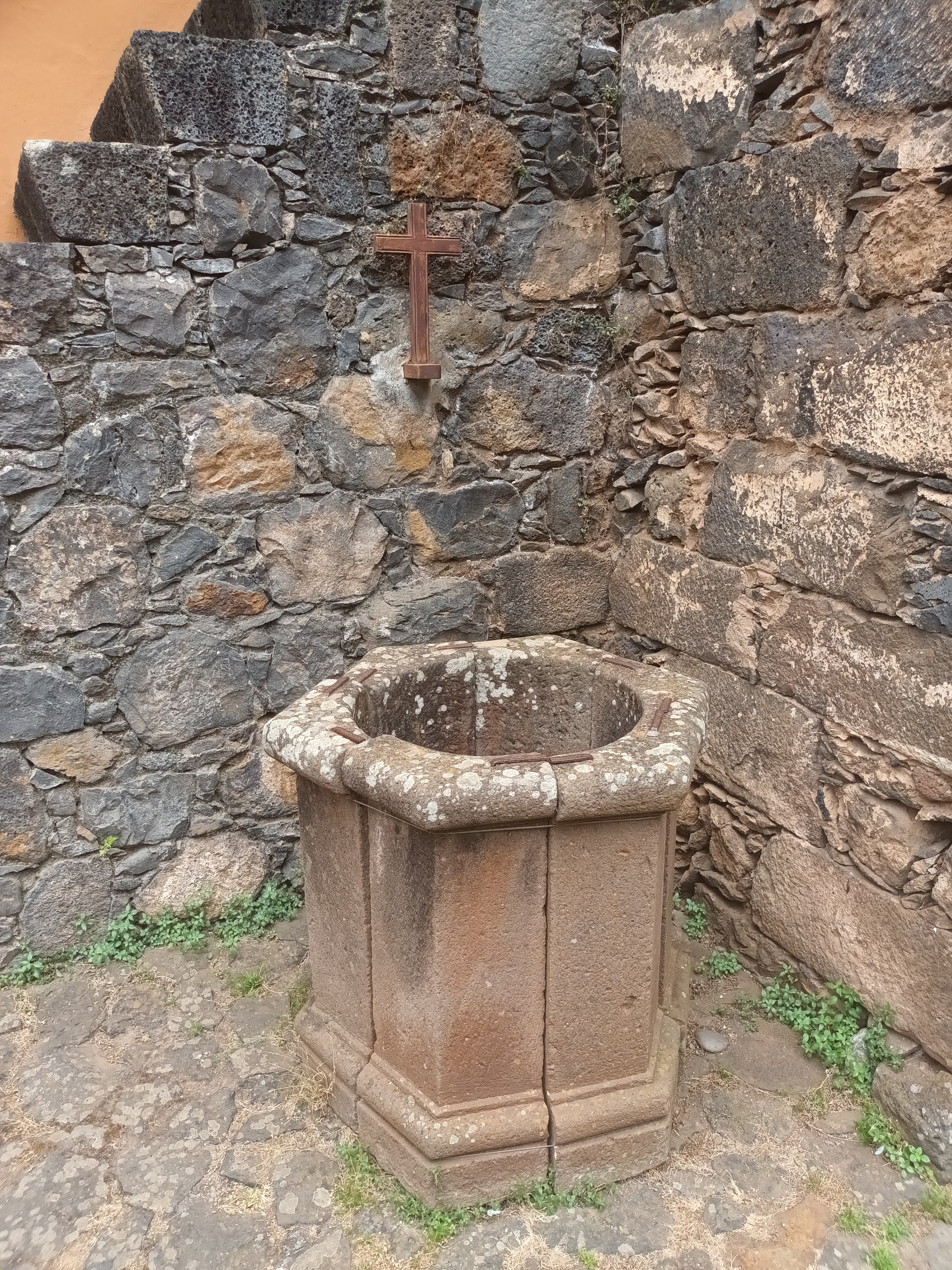
Well believed to be the place where Catalina Lercaro took her own life.

Catalina, daughter of Antonio Lercaro and his wife, was forced to marry an older man, who enjoyed a good position and great wealth. This arranged marriage did not please Catalina, who on her wedding day killed herself by leaping into a pit that was located in the courtyard of the family mansion. (Since 1993, this building has been operated as the Museum of the History of Tenerife). The legend suggests that Catalina's body was interred in one of the rooms in the house. Because she committed the sin of suicide, the Catholic Church prohibited her receiving a Christian burial in a consecrated cemetery. The Lercaro family left the city and moved to La Orotava. Since then many people claim to have seen the specter of Catalina Lercaro walking through the mansion (now the museum).

Catalina Lercaro is the most famous ghost of the Canary Islands. Her ghost story is also known in Spain. The mansion where she died is the most famous "haunted mansion" on the islands.

== In popular culture ==
This legend was popularized in the rest of Spain in the early 2000s, thanks to the radio program Milenio 3 and the television program Cuarto Milenio.

== Bibliography ==
- Finucane, R. C. (1996). Ghosts. Appearances of the Dead and Cultural Transformation. Prometheus Books. ISBN 978-1573920681.
- González, José Gregorio (2002). Canarias misteriosa. Los enigmas del Archipiélago Canario. Ediciones Alternativas. ISBN 978-84-932609-1-0.
- Díaz Viana, Luis (2008). Leyendas populares de España. Históricas, maravillosas y contemporáneas. La Esfera de los Libros. ISBN 978-8497347105.
