= Plaza de España (Santa Cruz de Tenerife) =

Public square in the Canary Islands

Coordinates: 28°28′01″N 16°14′50″W

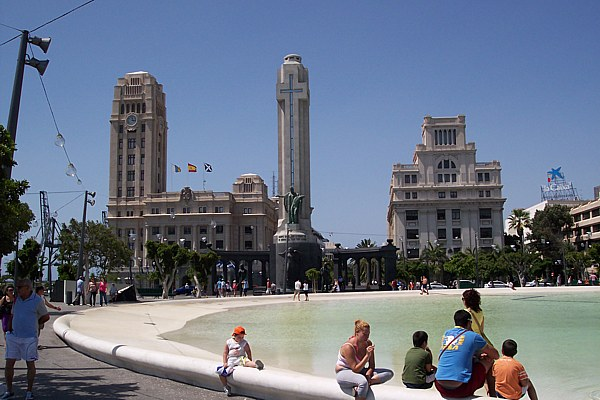
Plaza de España

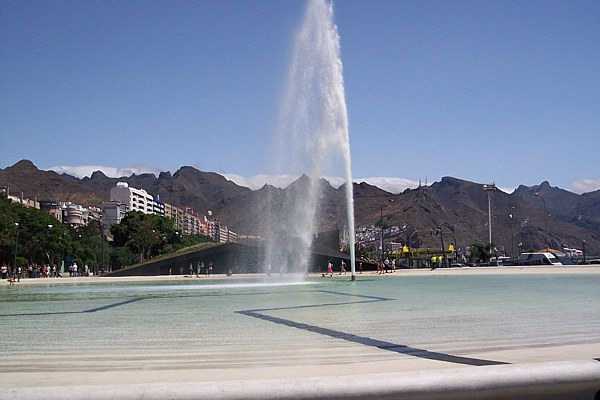
Artificial lake

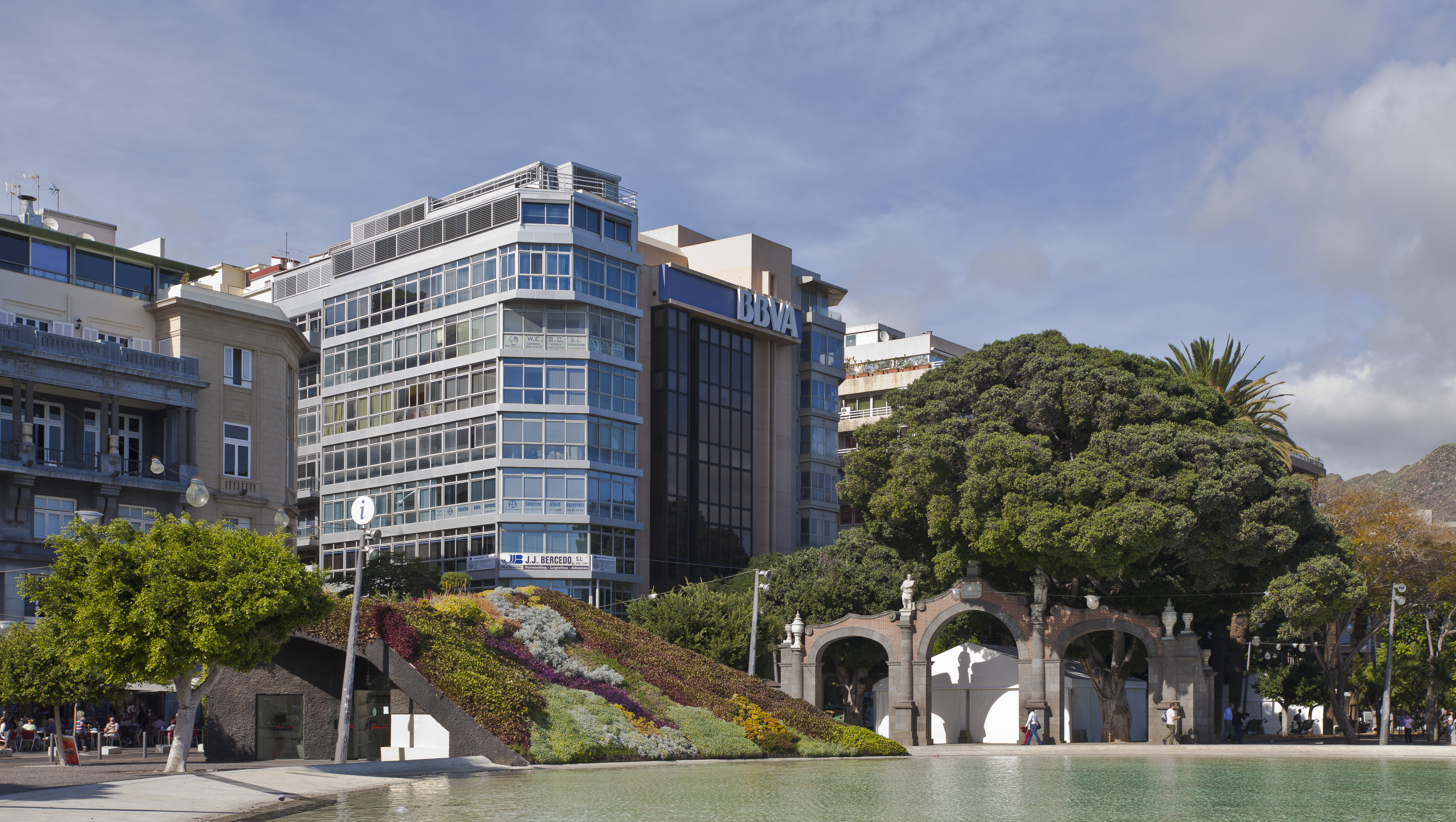
Buildings in the square next to the lake

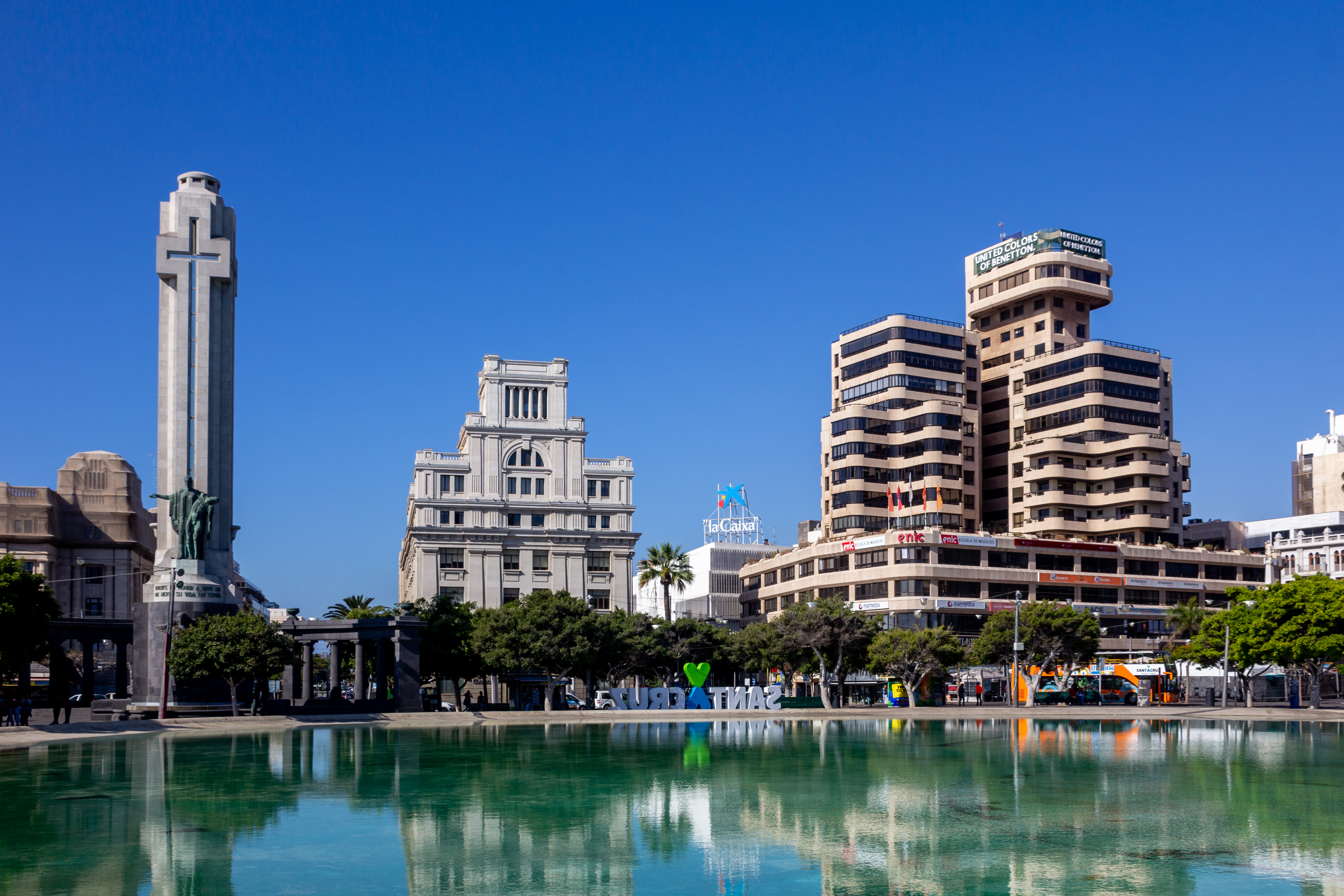
The lake and surrounding buildings

Plaza de España (lit. Spain Square), is the largest square in the city of Santa Cruz de Tenerife and the Canary Islands (Spain). The square is located in the centre of town, 1.4 km north of the Auditorio de Tenerife. This square is considered one of the "main squares" of the island of Tenerife, together with the Plaza del Cristo de La Laguna in San Cristóbal de La Laguna and the Plaza de la Patrona de Canarias in Candelaria. It hosts an artificial lake fountain, a work of Swiss architects Herzog & de Meuron.

The square was built in 1929 on the historic Castillo de San Cristóbal, a bastion for defending the island of piracy, currently there are only a few walls of the original building on display in a tunnel under the square. Recently the square was refurbished by the Swiss architects Herzog & de Meuron. The Plaza de España is surrounded by the Palacio Insular de Tenerife, the Palacio de la Carta and the Plaza de la Candelaria. In the centre of the square stands Monumento a los Caídos (a tribute to the fallen in the Spanish Civil War).

== Location ==
The plaza is located between Calle del Castillo and the port of Santa Cruz.

== History ==
=== Castle of San Cristóbal ===
The location of the square was originally the site of the San Cristóbal Castle, which was the city's main line of defense, responsible for defending the port.

=== Construction of the plaza ===
The creation of the plaza was first conceived in the 19th century. The square was constructed in 1929.

=== Refurbishment ===
The park was refurbished by Herzog & de Meuron in 2006. The refurbishment added a pond and pavilions. In June 2006 the remains of the castle were rediscovered, leading to the creation of an underground gallery to display the castle remains.

== Featured sculptures ==
=== Tourist sign ===
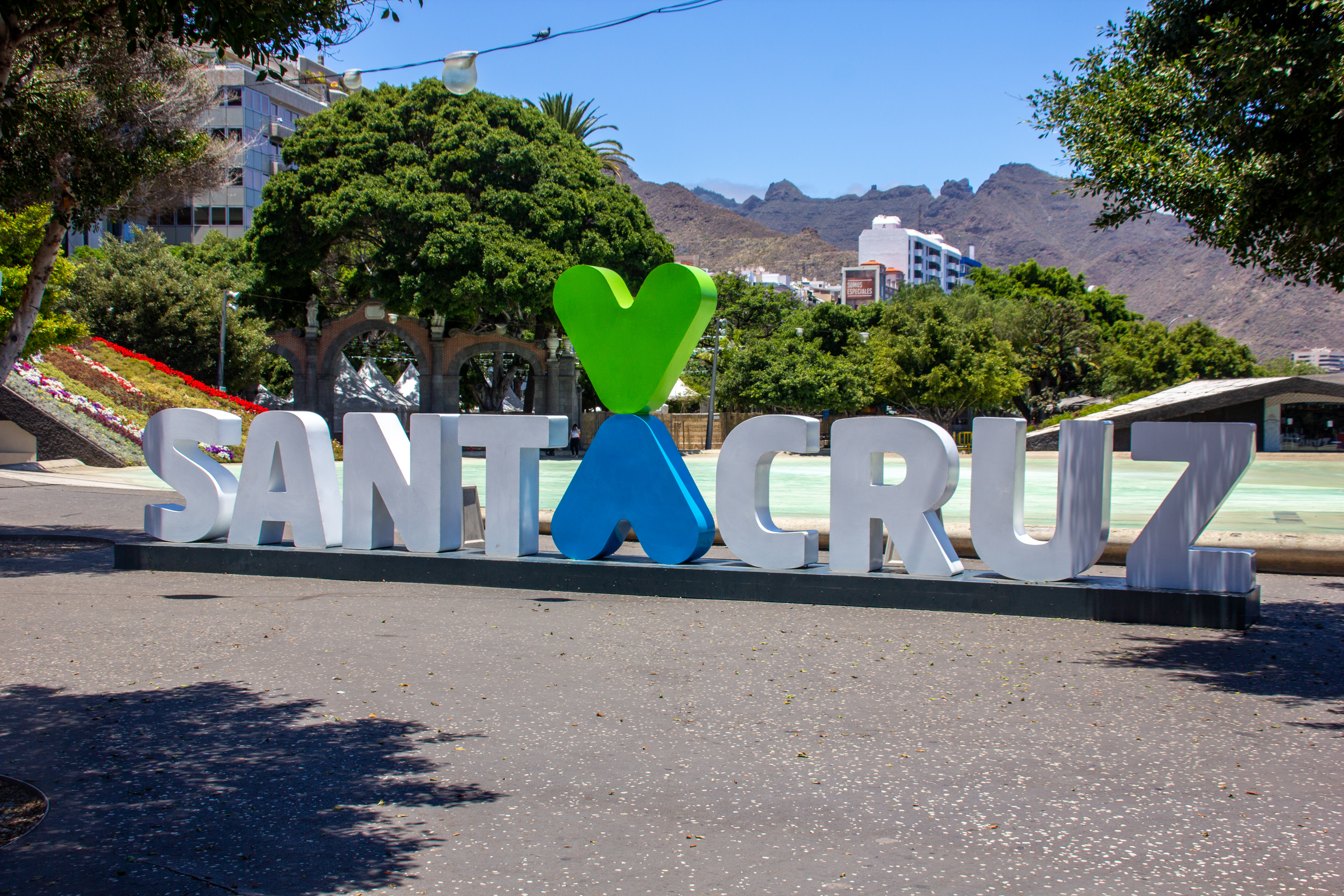
Tourist sign

A large sign of the tourist brand of the city (introduced in September 2016) is located at one end of the plaza, adjacent to the lake. The sign reads "Santa Cruz", short for the tourist slogan of "Santa Cruz, el corazón de Tenerife" - "Santa Cruz, the heart of Tenerife". The letters are white except for the last "a" of the word Santa, which is an inverted blue heart, on top of which is an upright green heart. Erected in December 2016, the structure is 11.1 metres (36 ft) long and 1.4 metres (4.6 ft) high (double that height at the hearts). It is made of galvanised steel with epoxy paint. The sign is repainted in different colors and with different symbols during important events.

=== Lo llevo bien ===
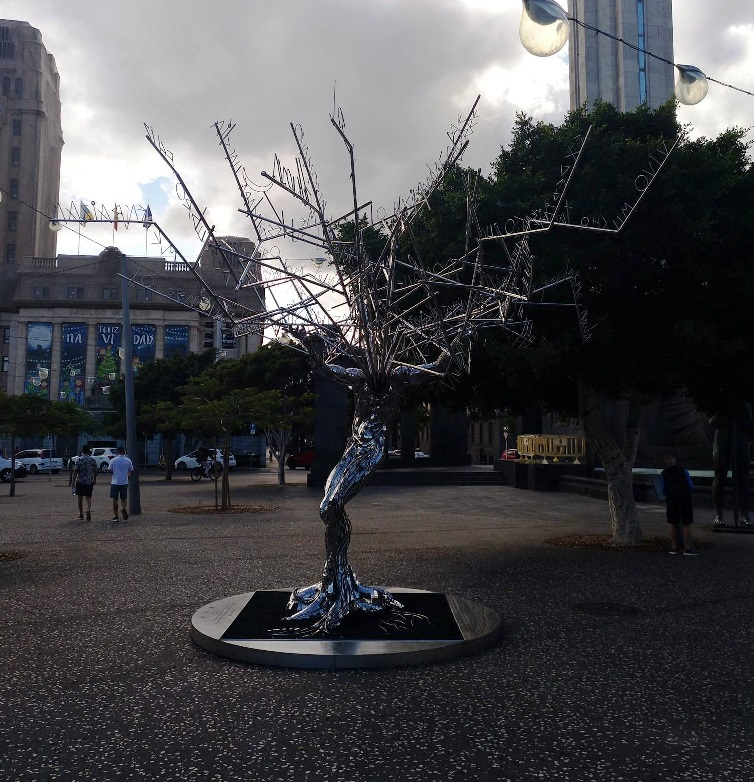
Sculpture titled Lo llevo bien.

Sculpture by the Basque artist Julio Nieto and located in the center of the square next to its artificial lake. It is a piece of stainless steel, five meters high and 450 kilos in weight with the appearance of a man in the shape of a tree that symbolizes "the optimism of the human being, who, despite all his thoughts, takes it well".

Originally exhibited in 2014 in the square during a street exhibition, it later left the city and moved to various art galleries in different cities around the world such as Madrid, Barcelona, Baltimore, Miami, Krefeld and New York. The citizens of Santa Cruz expressed their desire for the sculpture to remain in the city. In 2021 it was donated to the Santa Cruz town hall and was permanently installed in the Plaza de España.

== In popular culture ==
The plaza appeared in Jason Bourne, the fifth film of the Bourne series, representing the Syntagma Square of Athens.
