= Museum of the History of Tenerife =

Museum in Tenerife

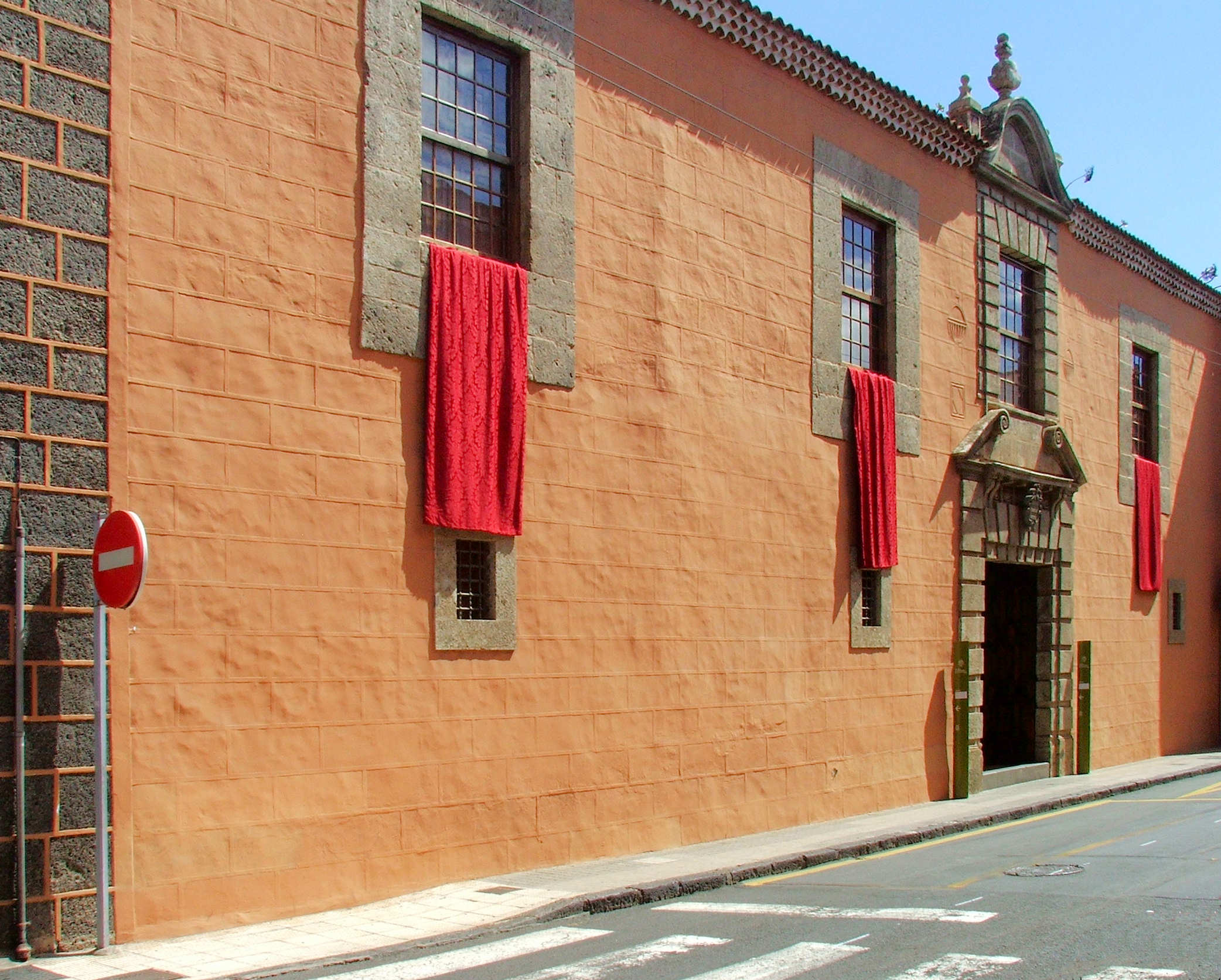
Museum of the History of Tenerife

The Museum of History and Anthropology of Tenerife (Spanish: Museo de Historia y Antropología de Tenerife) is part of the Autonomous Organism of Museums and the Cabildo de Tenerife. It opened in December 1993 in the property known as "Casa Lercaro" in San Cristóbal de La Laguna, Canary Islands, Spain.

The museum holds out the prospect of spreading the history of the island of Tenerife, offering an overview of institutional, socio-economic and cultural development of the island, from the fifteenth century to the twentieth century.

The museum also performs a task of research, rescue, preservation, dissemination and exhibition of heritage treasure pieces, documentary and bibliographic.

== Legend ==
In this mansion there is the legend of Catalina Lercaro. She was forced to marry an older man, who enjoyed a good position and great wealth. This marriage of convenience did not please Catalina, who on her wedding day decided to kill herself by leaping into the pit which is located in the courtyard of the family mansion. Since then many people claim to have seen the spectre of Catalina Lercaro walking through the halls of the museum. The mansion/museum is the most famous "haunted mansion" of the Canary Islands.
