= Museos de Tenerife =

- Location within Canary Islands
- Established: 1990s
- Location: Santa Cruz de Tenerife, Province of Santa Cruz de Tenerife, Canary Islands, Spain
- Website: Official website

Museums of Tenerife (Spanish: Museos de Tenerife), originally Autonomous Organization of Museums and Centers of Tenerife (Spanish: Organismo Autónomo de Museos y Centros de Tenerife), is an organisation in Tenerife.

== History ==
The organisation was created by Cabildo de Tenerife in the early 1990s. In 2011 it was renamed from "Organismo Autónomo de Museos y Centros de Tenerife" to "Museos de Tenerife".

At present, it constitutes the most complete museum network in the Canary Islands.

== Museums ==
The organisation comprises the following museums:

- Museo de la Naturaleza y Arqueología
  - Museo Arqueologico de Tenerife
  - Instituto Canario de Bioantropología
  - Museo de Ciencias Naturales de Tenerife
- Museum of Science and the Cosmos
- Museum of the History of Tenerife
  - Sede Casa Lercaro
  - Sede Casa de Carta
  - Centro de Interpretación "Castillo de San Cristóbal"
- Centro de Documentación Canario-Americano
- Cueva del Viento
