= Museum of Science and the Cosmos =

Museum in the Spanish Canary Islands of Macaronesia

- El Museo de la Ciencia y el Cosmos
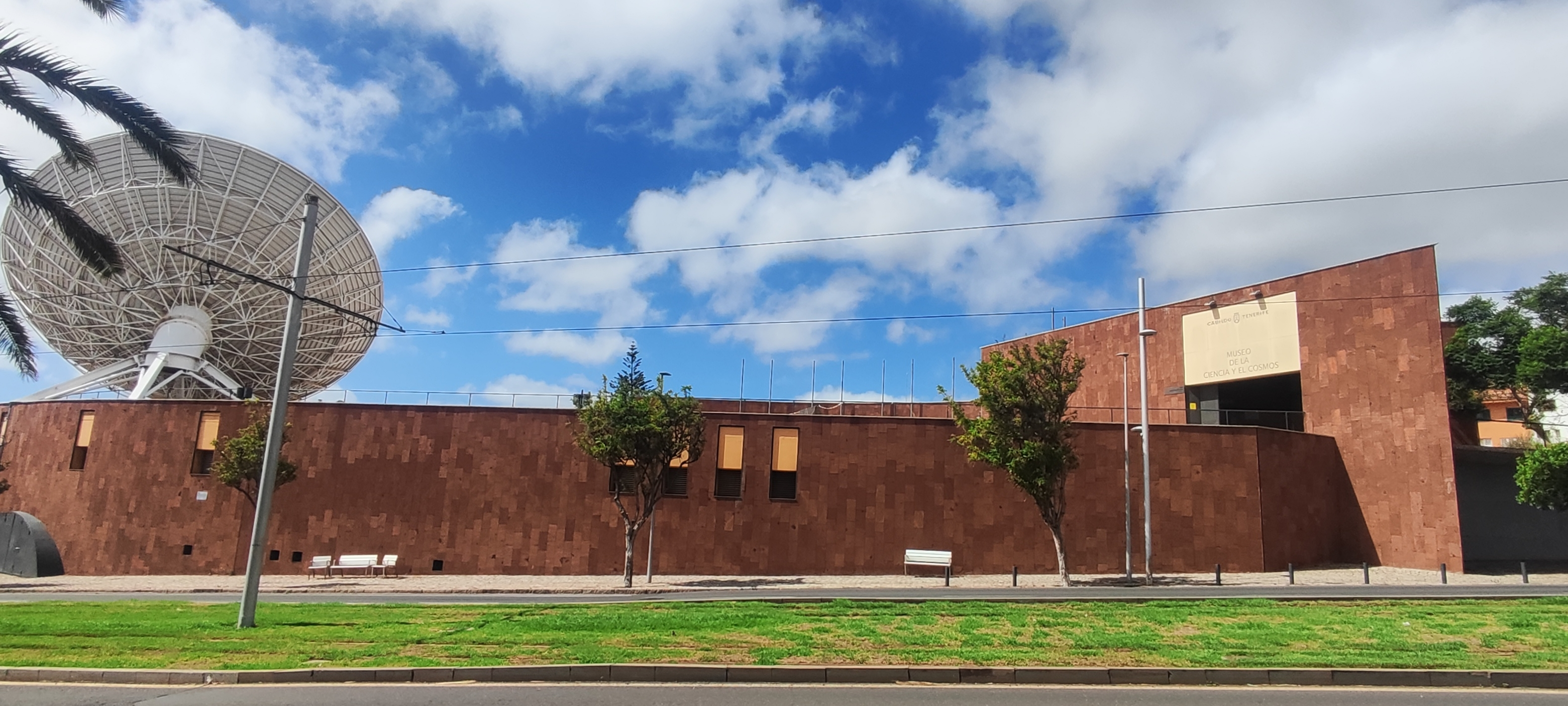

- Location within Canary Islands
- Established: 1993
- Location: San Cristóbal de La Laguna, Spain
- Type: science museum
- Founders: Island Council of Tenerife, Instituto de Astrofísica de Canarias
- Website: Official website

The Museum of Science and the Cosmos (Spanish: El Museo de las Ciencias y el Cosmos) is an astronomy, technology, and science museum located in the city of San Cristóbal de La Laguna on Tenerife island, in the Spanish Canary Islands of Macaronesia. It belongs to the Cabildo de Tenerife and the Tenerife Organization of Museums and Centers. The museum opened in 1993 under the initiative of the Cabildo and the Instituto de Astrofisica de Canarias (IAC). It is considered the primary astronomy and science museum of the Canary Islands and the Macaronesian archipelago.

== History ==
The building was designed by architects Jordi Garcés and Enric Sòria, with the museum designed by Enric Franch. The museum is in the shape of a half-star, and is located adjacent to the IAC in La Laguna.

The creation of the museum was promoted by the Instituto de Astrofísica de Canarias (led by Ignacio García de la Rosa) and the Cabildo de Tenerife. The inauguration on 11 May 1993 was attended by Russian cosmonaut Sergei Krikalev, and it was visited by the Prince of Asturias on 6 July 1993.

The current museum director is Héctor Socas-Navarro (since 11 April 2019).

== Exhibitions ==
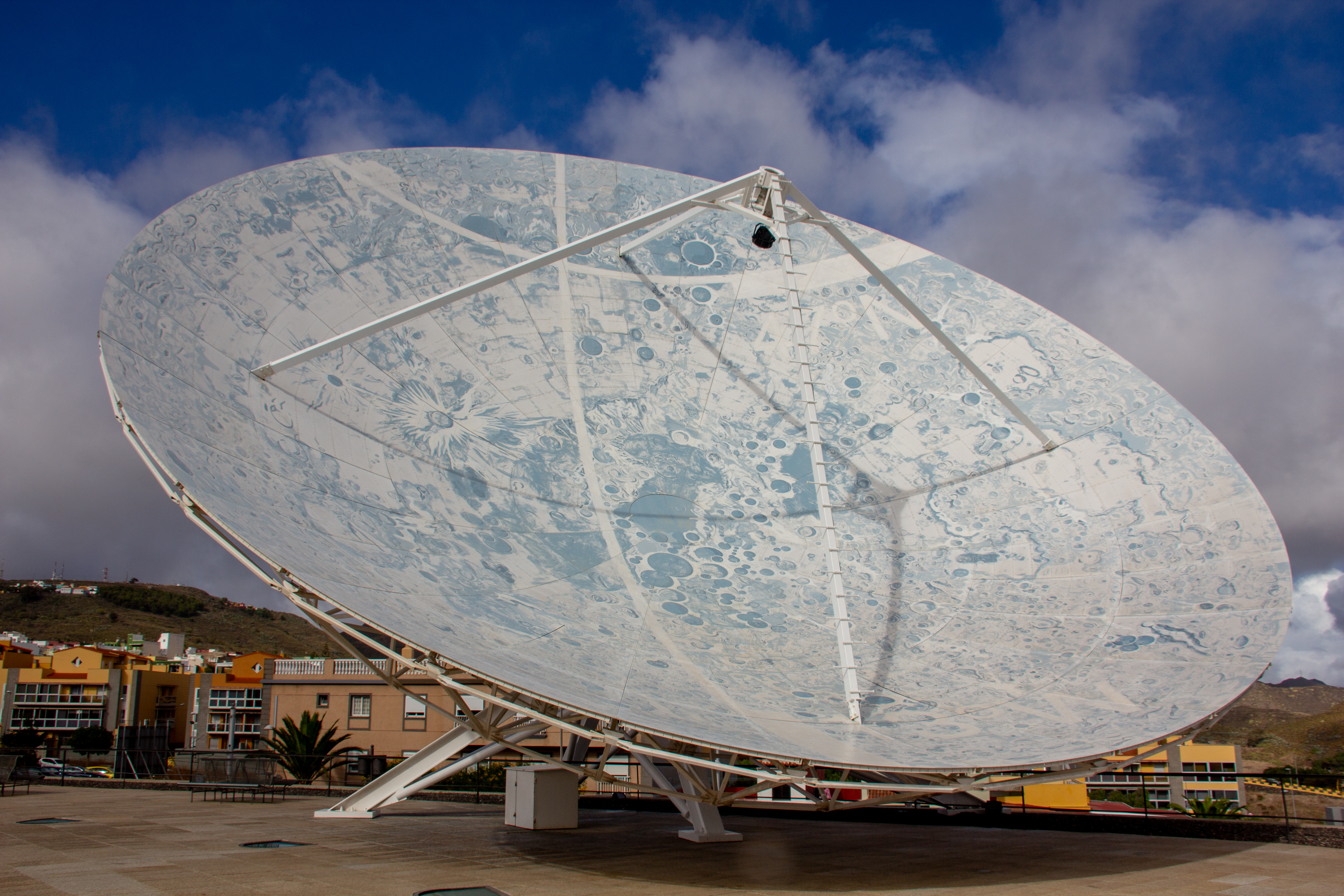
The radio telescope

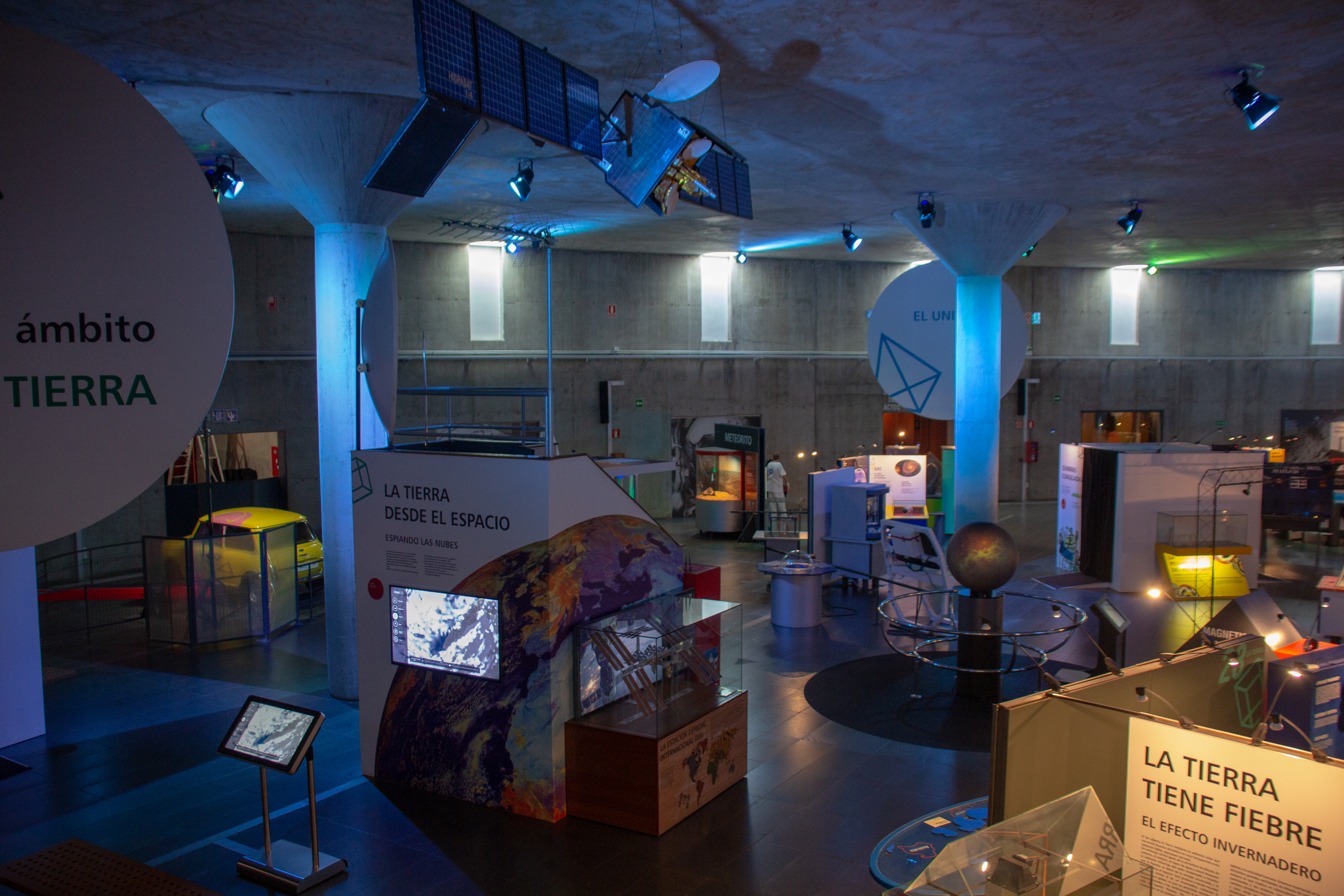
Exhibits in the museum

The museum was designed as modern science museum, focused on science communication through interactivity with the displays.

It covers all sciences, with a bias towards astronomy. It has a permanent exhibition that covers such topics as the Earth's rotation, solar activity (including sunspots and flares), orbits around black holes, as well as more general science topics such as the principles of a lever, how a mobile phone works, and human organs. It also has an astronomy room with models of telescopes such as the Gran Telescopio Canarias, and the Teide Observatory and Roque de los Muchachos Observatory.

It has a 6.5 metres (21 ft) planetarium, with a GOTO GE II projection system to show 2,800 stars, and a Digistar 5 digital projection system, with a variety of shows.

The Plaza del Museo (museum plaza) has a radio telescope painted with the coordinates of Montes Teneriffe on the Moon, as well as a small telescope and an Analemmatic sundial.

It has an auditorium with regular talks, and also offers astronomical nights and camping.

== Operation ==
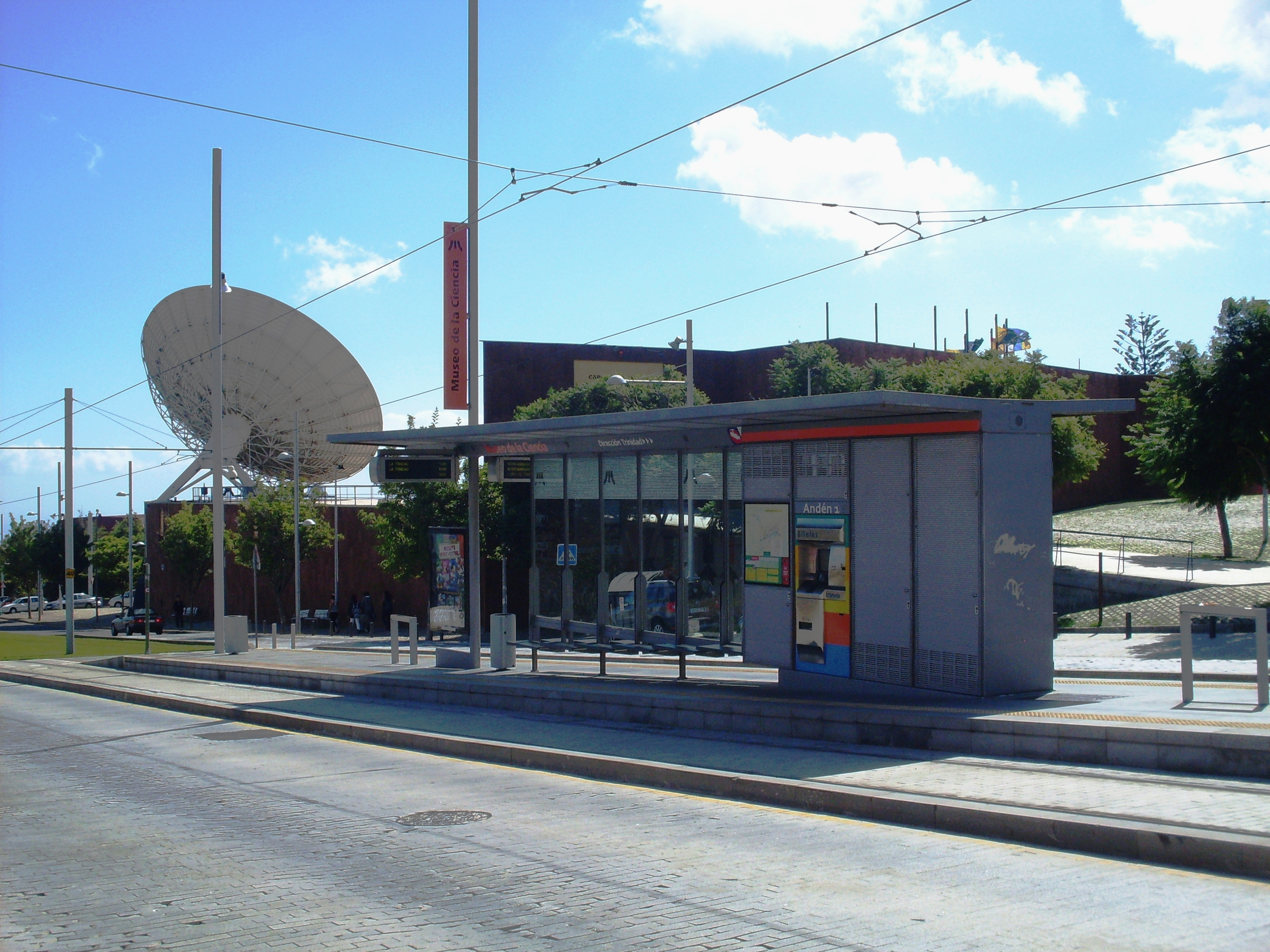
Transit stop at the museum

The museum is operated by Cabildo de Tenerife and Museos de Tenerife. The Museo de la Ciencia stop of Line 1 of the Tenerife Tram is immediately outside the museum.

It is open between 9 am and 8 pm on Tuesdays through Saturdays, and 10 am to 5 pm on Sundays, Mondays and holidays. As of 2019, general admission costs €5 (reduced to €3 for residents), discounted to €3.50 for students and pensioners (€2 if also resident), with free entry on Fridays and Saturdays between 4 pm and 8 pm, and on holidays between 1 pm and 5 pm. The planetarium entrance fee is €1.
