= Castle of San Cristóbal (Santa Cruz de Tenerife) =

Castle in the Canary Islands

- Santa Cruz de Tenerife (Canary Islands, Spain)
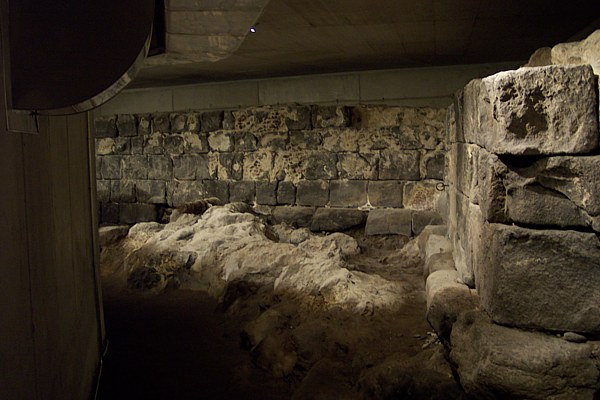

Location
- Location of the fortification on the island of Tenerife
- Coordinates: 28°28′01″N 16°14′51″W

Site history
- Built: 1575–1577
- Fate: demolished in 1928

The Castle of San Cristóbal (Spanish: Castillo de San Cristóbal) in Santa Cruz de Tenerife (Canary Islands, Spain) was the first fortification of significance on the island of Tenerife and the main defensive building on Santa Cruz Bay. The central Castle Street is named after this fort.

Under the administration of Gov. Álvarez de Fonseca, construction began in 1575 but it was the January 20, 1577 when it entered service. The castle was demolished in 1928 to construct the Plaza de España, with the remains of the castle buried under it for centuries. On June 28, 2006, during the refurbishment of the Plaza of Spain, some remains were later found to belong to the castle. At that time precautionary and protective measures were taken in order to ensure the preservation of the find.

There remain only a few walls of the original building on display in a tunnel under the Plaza de España. Today, the castle is a museum which houses the famous "Cañón Tigre" (Tiger Cannon), which shot a musketball to Rear-Admiral Horatio Nelson's right arm, which fractured his humerus bone in multiple places on July 25, 1797, the reason why he had his arm amputated.

== Construction and use ==
The castle was the main defensive castle for Santa Cruz. It was constructed in 1575, with construction work starting on 15 December 1575, and the Cabildo moving the artillery there in 1577. The work was started by the then-governor of the island, Juan Alvarez de Fonseca. It was built on a reef in Bias Diaz Cove. The square-shaped building had a rampart at each corner.

It was involved in battles against Blake on 30 April 1657; Jennings on 6 November 1706; and Nelson on 25 July 1797. It was also the residence of the Captains General and the Governors, and was the seat of the Military Government.

== Destruction ==
The castle was demolished in 1928.

The castle was remembered in the name of "Calle Castillo", Castle Street, in Santa Cruz.

== Rediscovery and visitor centre ==
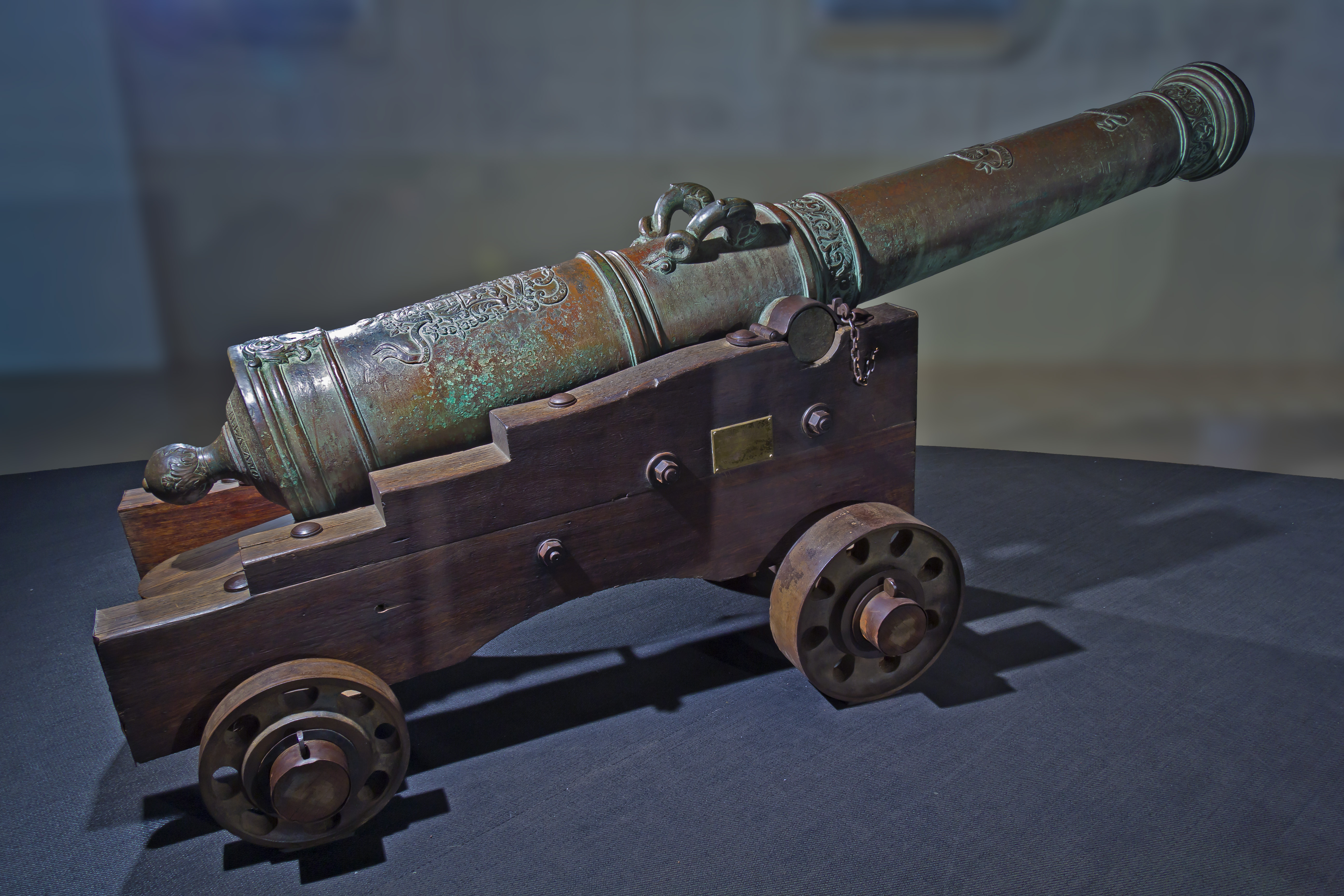
Cañón Tigre

The Plaza de España was remodeled in 2006, and in June 2006 the remains of the castle were discovered. Due to its historical importance, the designs for the new plaza were modified to incorporate an underground gallery to display the remains, and an outline of the castle was added to the bottom of the plaza's lake.

The remains under the Plaza de España are protected. One corner of the castle remains, and can be visited underneath the plaza, along with a small exhibition, operated by Museos de Tenerife.

On 25 July 2009, the El Tigre cannon was installed in a dedicated room at the centre. The bronze cannon was constructed in Seville in the 18th century, and is 3 metres (9.8 ft) long and weighs 2,000kg. It is said to be the cannon that injured Nelson during the Battle of Santa Cruz de Tenerife (1797).
