= Battle of Santa Cruz de Tenerife (1706) =

During the War of the Spanish Succession in the Canary Islands, Spain

Coordinates: 28°28′26″N 16°14′35″W

- Part of the War of the Spanish Succession
Date	6 November 1706
Location	Santa Cruz de Tenerife, Tenerife, Spain
Result	Bourbon Spanish victory

Belligerents
Bourbon Spain	Kingdom of England

Commanders and leaders
(Spain) José de Ayala y Rojas	(England) John Jennings

Strength
4,000 soldiers 70 guns	13 ships 800 guns

Casualties and losses
Light	Heavy

The Battle of Santa Cruz de Tenerife was a minor military action of the War of the Spanish Succession during which an English fleet of 13 ships under the command of Admiral John Jennings attempted unsuccessfully to seize the city of Santa Cruz de Tenerife. Jennings previously relied on the English triumphs in the Iberian Peninsula demanding recognition for the sovereignty of Charles II of England over the Canary Islands, but their offers were rejected.

== Battle ==
By 1706, during the War of the Spanish Succession, Philip V had lost Gibraltar to an Anglo-Dutch fleet commanded by George Rooke, the Spanish galleons in the port of Vigo had been burnt or captured, and the Allied army was entering Castile after overrunning Aragon, Catalonia and Valencia. At this time, Admiral Jennings sailed into Santa Cruz bay with 12 ships of the line and several minor warships in order to capture the town. The English ships were subjected to a heavy gunfire from hidden shore batteries, suffering many casualties.

After an initial landing attempt was repulsed by the Spanish artillery of Castle of San Cristóbal, Jennings sent an emissary to the authorities of Santa Cruz who apologized for the attack saying that it was an error. In addition, the emissary urged the authorities of the island to join the Hapsburg side under the menace of take the city by force. The mayor José de Ayala y Rojas, head of the defense of Santa Cruz in the absence of Governor Agustín de Robles, refused, confirming the loyalty of the islands to King Philip V. «If Philip, our king, had lost his all in the Peninsula, these islands would still remain faithful to him.» He said. After this, the English fleet withdrew.

== Aftermath ==
Although the British fleet retreated rapidly at night, the Spanish armed militia continued to patrol Santa Cruz for two days, and La Palma for a few months. For this victory over the English, a second lion head was added to the coat of arms of Santa Cruz de Tenerife (the third lion head was added after the repulse of Horatio Nelson in 1797). The British again attacked the Canary Islands in 1743, but were again beaten off.

== See also ==
- Battle of Santa Cruz de Tenerife (1657)
- Battle of Santa Cruz de Tenerife (1797)
