= Plaza de la Candelaria =

Square in Santa Cruz de Tenerife

Coordinates: 28.466706°N 16.247948°W

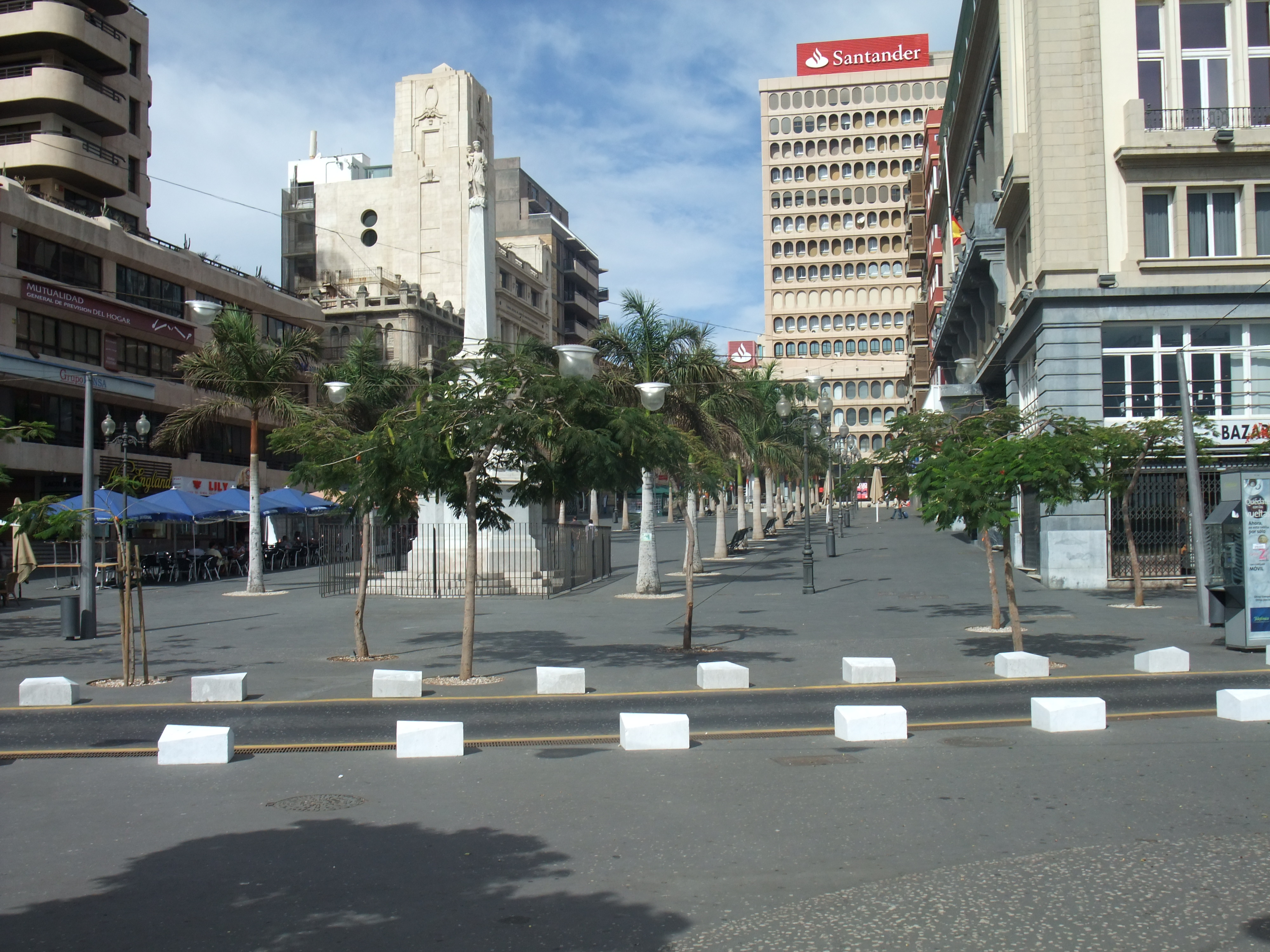
Plaza de la Candelaria.

The Plaza de la Candelaria, is a square in the city of Santa Cruz de Tenerife (Canary Islands, Spain), which is located next to the Plaza de España.

In the square stands the monument of Triunfo de la Candelaria, also called the Obelisk of La Candelaria, which is one of the major sculptural monuments of the city, and is dedicated to the Virgin of Candelaria, the patroness of the Canary Islands, which is named this square.

== Triunfo de la Candelaria ==
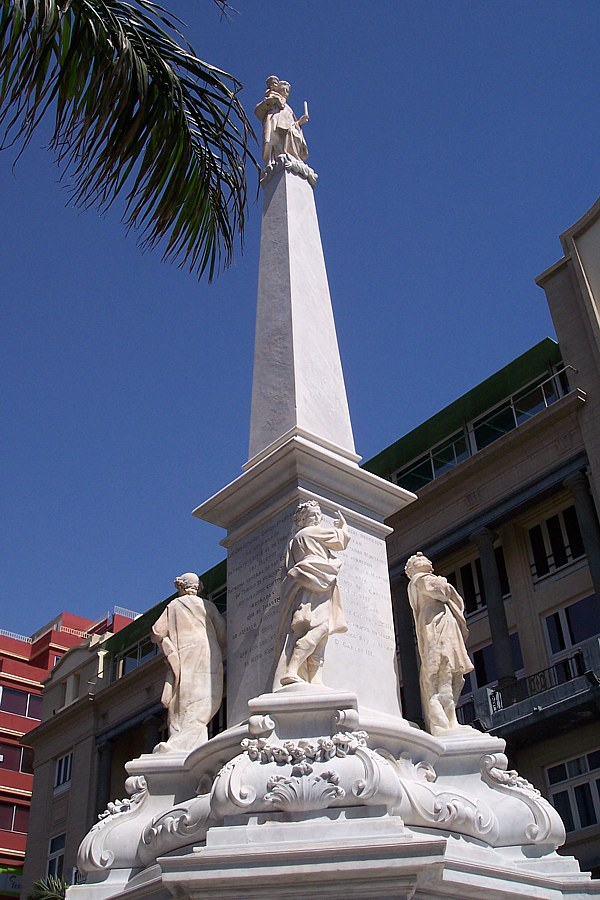
Triunfo de la Candelaria, obelisk of La Candelaria.

The Triunfo de la Candelaria also called Obelisco de la Candelaria, is a major sculptural monuments of the city. The monument is of white marble and was carved by sculptor Pasquale Bocciardo in 1768.

Originally had a height of 11 meters on a square base, currently it is 4 meters. At the base there are four marble statues representing the Guanches, who venerate the image of the Virgin of Candelaria, located at the top of the obelisk.

There are several inscriptions that refer to the devotion that Canarians have always had by this invocation of the Virgin. Many travel books written in the 19th and 20th centuries have described this monument, because until the 20th century was the first religious monument and the first symbol that passengers saw after arriving to Tenerife.

Currently during the month of May makes a floral offering folk and monument at the foot of the Triunfo de la Candelaria, in commemoration of the "Fiestas de Mayo" which celebrates the anniversary of the founding of the city of Santa Cruz de Tenerife.

== See also ==
- Plaza de La Candelaria
