= Antonio Gutiérrez de Otero y Santayana =

Spanish Army officer

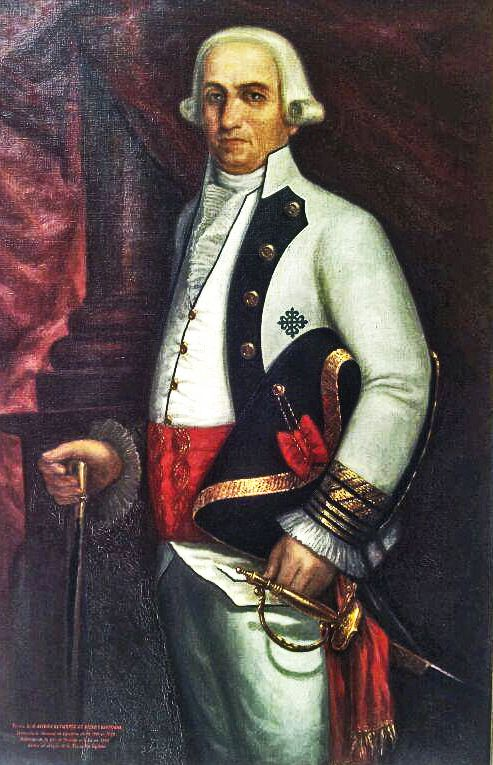
- Born: 8 May 1729; Aranda de Duero, Burgos
- Died: 15 May 1799 (aged 70); Santa Cruz de Tenerife, Canary Islands
- Burial place: Iglesia de la Concepción (Santa Cruz de Tenerife)
- Military career
- Allegiance: Spain
- Service years: 1736-1799
- Rank: Lieutenant general
- Unit: 1st King's Immemorial Infantry Regiment of AHQ
- Conflicts: Invasion of Algiers (1775); Great Siege of Gibraltar; Battle of Santa Cruz de Tenerife (1797)
- Memorials: Busts and streets in Aranda de Duero and Santa Cruz de Tenerife

Lieutenant-General Antonio Gutiérrez de Otero y Santayana (8 May 1729 – 15 May 1799) was a Spanish Army officer who served in the American Revolutionary War and French Revolutionary Wars.

== Biography ==
He was born in Aranda de Duero, in Burgos, Old Castile, Spain. His father was in the military, and Gutiérrez followed his father's footsteps by enlisting as a cadet in the Spanish army at the age of seven.

He participated in Spanish military campaigns in Italy, the failed invasion of Algiers in 1775, and in the Great Siege of Gibraltar under General Martín Alvarez. Gutiérrez also served as Commander of the island of Menorca.

He was named Commander-General of the Canary Islands in 1791, and assumed this position on 31 January 1791; his predecessor in the position had been the Marquis of Branciforte.

During the Battle of Santa Cruz de Tenerife (1797), Gutiérrez was suffering from an attack of asthma, but he managed to repulse an attempt to capture the port by British forces under Rear-Admiral Horatio Nelson. Gutiérrez allowed the British to leave with the honours of war.

As a result of this victory, Gutiérrez was granted the Encomienda of Esparragal in the Order of Alcántara (a system of endowments) by Charles IV of Spain.

Gutiérrez's health continued to suffer and he was afflicted by an attack of paralysis on 22 April 1799. He died on 15 May that year at Santa Cruz de Tenerife, and was buried in the chapel of Saint James the Great (Apóstol Santiago) in the parish of La Concepción de Santa Cruz de Santiago de Tenerife.
