= En marcha (Santa Cruz de Tenerife) =

Tenerife newspaper

- Founded: 1930
- Ceased publication: 1936
- Political alignment: Anarcho-syndicalism
- Language: Spanish language
- Headquarters: Santa Cruz de Tenerife

En marcha ('On March') was a newspaper published from Santa Cruz de Tenerife, Spain, as the organ of the Canarian Regional Federation of Confederación Nacional del Trabajo (CNT). En marcha was launched in 1930. It was published, albeit with some interruptions, until the outbreak of the Spanish Civil War in 1936. The founding director of the newspaper was Bartolomé Hernández. During 1933 Hernández was temporarily substituted by Manuel Pérez. All in all some 200 issues of En marcha were published.
