= Canary Islands =

Spanish archipelago off the coast of Northwest Africa

Canary Islands Canarias (Spanish)
- Autonomous community
- Flag Coat of arms
- Anthem: "Himno de Canarias" "Anthem of the Canaries"
- Location of the Canary Islands in Spain
- Interactive map of Canary Islands
- Coordinates: 28°N 16°W
- Country: Spain
- Capital: Santa Cruz de Tenerife (executive and legislative) and Las Palmas de Gran Canaria (executive and judicial)
- Largest city: Las Palmas de Gran Canaria
- Provinces: Las Palmas and Santa Cruz de Tenerife

Government
  - Type: Devolved government in a constitutional monarchy
  - Body: Parliament of the Canary Islands
  - President: Fernando Clavijo Batlle (CC)

Area
  - Total: 7,445.58 km^{2} (2,874.75 sq mi)
  - Rank: 13th in Spain
- 1.5% of Spain

Population (2025)
  - Total: 2,258,866
  - Rank: 7th in Spain
  - Density: 303.383/km^{2} (785.760/sq mi)
- 4.6% of Spain
- Demonym(s): Canarian canario/-a (Spanish)

GDP (nominal)
  - Total: €58.145 billion
  - Per capita: €25,751
- Time zone: UTC+0 (WET)
  - Summer (DST): UTC+1 (WEST)
- ISO 3166 code: IC; ES-CN
- Statute of Autonomy: 10 August 1983
- Official languages: Spanish
- Congress: 15 deputies (out of 350)
- Senate: 14 senators (out of 265)
- HDI (2023): 0.884 very high · 15th in Spain
- Website: www.gobiernodecanarias.org

The Canary Islands (/kəˈnɛəri/; Spanish: Canarias [kaˈnaɾjas]) or Canaries are an archipelago in the Atlantic Ocean and the southernmost autonomous community of Spain, located about 100 kilometres (60 mi) off the northwest coast of Africa. The archipelago has a population of over 2.2 million inhabitants, making it the most populous overseas special territory of the European Union.

The seven main islands, listed from largest to smallest by area, are Tenerife, Fuerteventura, Gran Canaria, Lanzarote, La Palma, La Gomera, and El Hierro. The only other inhabited island is La Graciosa, which is administratively dependent on Lanzarote. The archipelago also includes numerous smaller islands and islets, such as Alegranza, Isla de Lobos, Montaña Clara, Roque del Oeste, and Roque del Este, as well as various rocks, including Garachico and Anaga. Historically, the island chain was referred to as "the Fortunate Isles". The Canary Islands are the southernmost and westernmost region of Spain as well as the largest and most populous archipelago of Macaronesia. They are also the largest and most populated archipelago in Spain. The archipelago has long played a geo-strategic role as a bridge between Europe, the Americas, and Africa.

As of 2025, the Canary Islands had a population of 2,258,866, an area of 7,445.58 square kilometres (2,874.75 sq mi) and a density of 303 inhabitants per km^{2}. This makes them the 7th most populous autonomous community in Spain, the 13th-largest in area, and the 3rd-highest in population density, behind only Madrid and the Basque Country. The population is mostly concentrated on the two capital islands, with around 43% on Tenerife and 39% on Gran Canaria. In 2026, the Canary Islands are expected to have a nominal GDP of €64.123 billion, resulting in a GDP per capita of €28,272.

The Canary Islands, especially Tenerife, Gran Canaria, Fuerteventura, and Lanzarote, are a major tourist destination, with over 14.1 million visitors in 2023. This is due to their beaches, subtropical climate, and important natural attractions, especially Maspalomas in Gran Canaria and Mount Teide, a World Heritage Site in Tenerife. Mount Teide is the highest peak in Spain and the 3rd tallest volcano in the world, measured from its base on the ocean floor. The islands have warm summers and winters warm enough for the climate to be technically tropical at sea level. The amount of precipitation and the level of maritime moderation vary depending on location and elevation. The archipelago includes green areas as well as semi-desert. The islands' high mountains are ideal for astronomical observation, because they lie above the temperature inversion layer. As a result, the archipelago has two professional astronomical observatories: the Teide Observatory on Tenerife, and Roque de los Muchachos Observatory on La Palma.

In 1927, the Province of Canary Islands was split into two provinces, Santa Cruz de Tenerife and Las Palmas. In 1982, the autonomous community of the Canary Islands was established. The cities of Santa Cruz de Tenerife and Las Palmas de Gran Canaria are, jointly, the capitals of the islands. Those cities are also, respectively, the capitals of the provinces of Santa Cruz de Tenerife and Las Palmas. Las Palmas de Gran Canaria has been the largest city in the Canaries since 1768, except for a brief period in the 1910s. Between the 1833 territorial division of Spain and 1927, Santa Cruz de Tenerife was the sole capital of the Canary Islands. In 1927, it was ordered by decree that the capital of the Canary Islands would be shared between two cities, and this arrangement persists to the present day. The third largest city in the Canary Islands is San Cristóbal de La Laguna, another World Heritage Site on Tenerife.

During the Age of Sail, the islands were the main stopover for Spanish galleons during the Spanish colonisation of the Americas, which sailed that far south in order to catch the prevailing northeasterly trade winds.

== Etymology ==
The name Islas Canarias is likely derived from the Latin name Canariae Insulae, meaning 'Islands of the Dogs', perhaps because monk seals or sea dogs were abundant, a name that was evidently generalised from the ancient name of one of these islands, Canaria – presumably Gran Canaria. According to the historian Pliny the Elder, the island Canaria contained "vast multitudes of dogs of very large size". The connection to dogs is retained in their depiction on the islands' coat-of-arms.

Other theories speculate that the name comes from the Nukkari Berber tribe living in North Africa, named in Roman sources as Canarii, though Pliny again mentions the relation of this term with dogs.

The name of the islands is not derived from the canary bird; rather, the birds are named after the islands.

Canary Wharf, located on the Isle of Dogs in London, was named after a warehouse which handled imports from the islands.

== History ==
=== Ancient and pre-Hispanic times ===
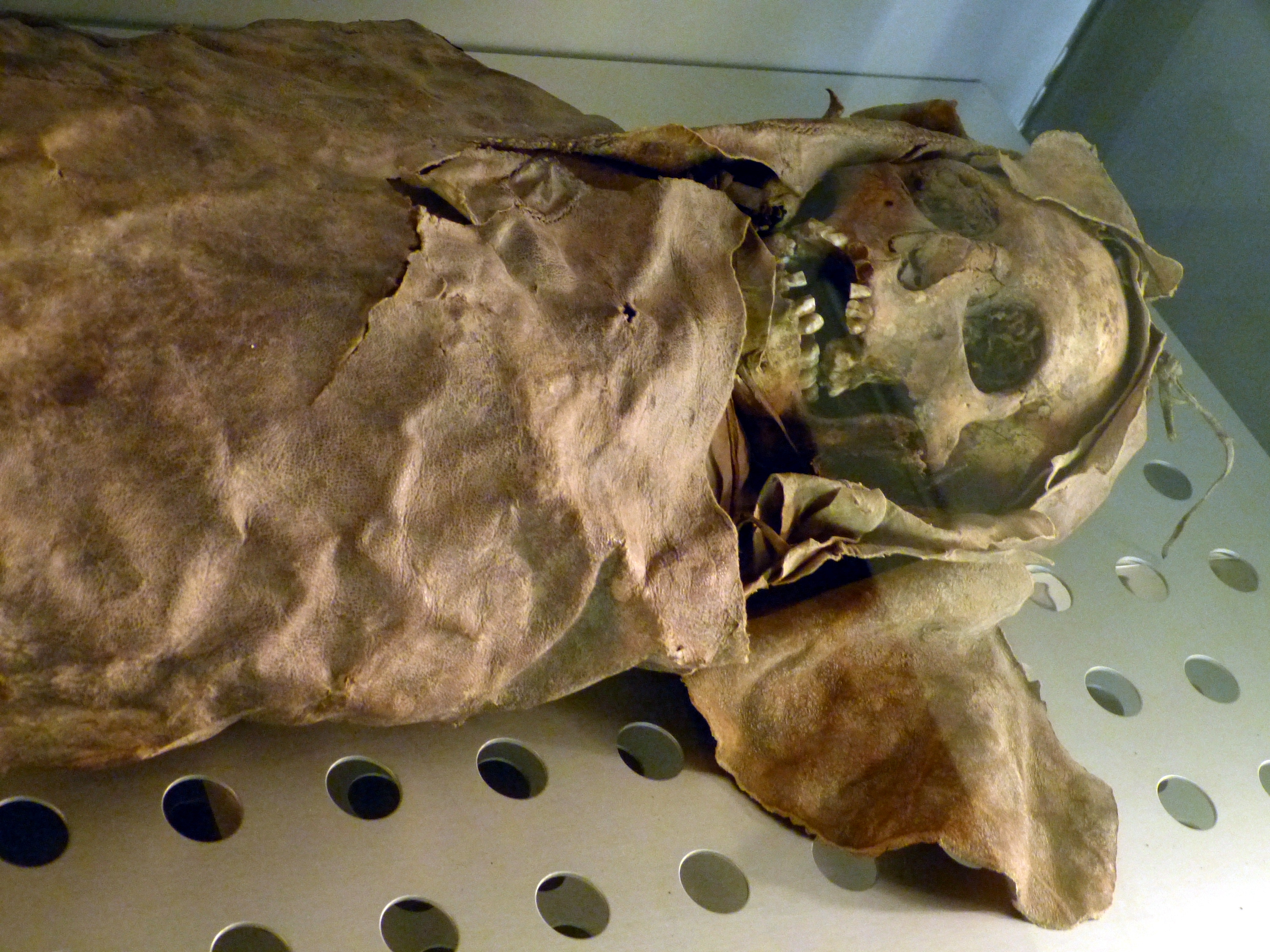
Guanche mummy of a woman (830 AD). Museo de la Naturaleza y el Hombre, Santa Cruz de Tenerife.

Before the arrival of humans, the Canaries were inhabited by prehistoric animals including the giant lizard (Gallotia goliath), the Tenerife and Gran Canaria giant rats, and giant tortoises, Geochelone burchardi and Geochelone vulcanica.

Although the original settlement of what are now called the Canary Islands is not entirely clear, linguistic, genetic, and archaeological analyses indicate that indigenous peoples were living on the Canary Islands at least 2,000 years ago, possibly 3,000, and that they shared a common origin with the Amazighs on the nearby North African coast. Reaching the islands may have taken place using several small boats, landing on the easternmost islands Lanzarote and Fuerteventura. These groups came to be known collectively as the Guanches, although Guanches had been the name for only the indigenous inhabitants of Tenerife.

According to a 2024 study by the University of Las Palmas de Gran Canaria, there is archaeological evidence that the Romans were the first to establish contact with the islands, during the period from the 1st century BC to the 1st century AD. There was no overlap with the occupation by the people who were inhabiting the islands at the time of the Spanish conquest, who had first arrived sometime between the 1st and 3rd centuries AD.

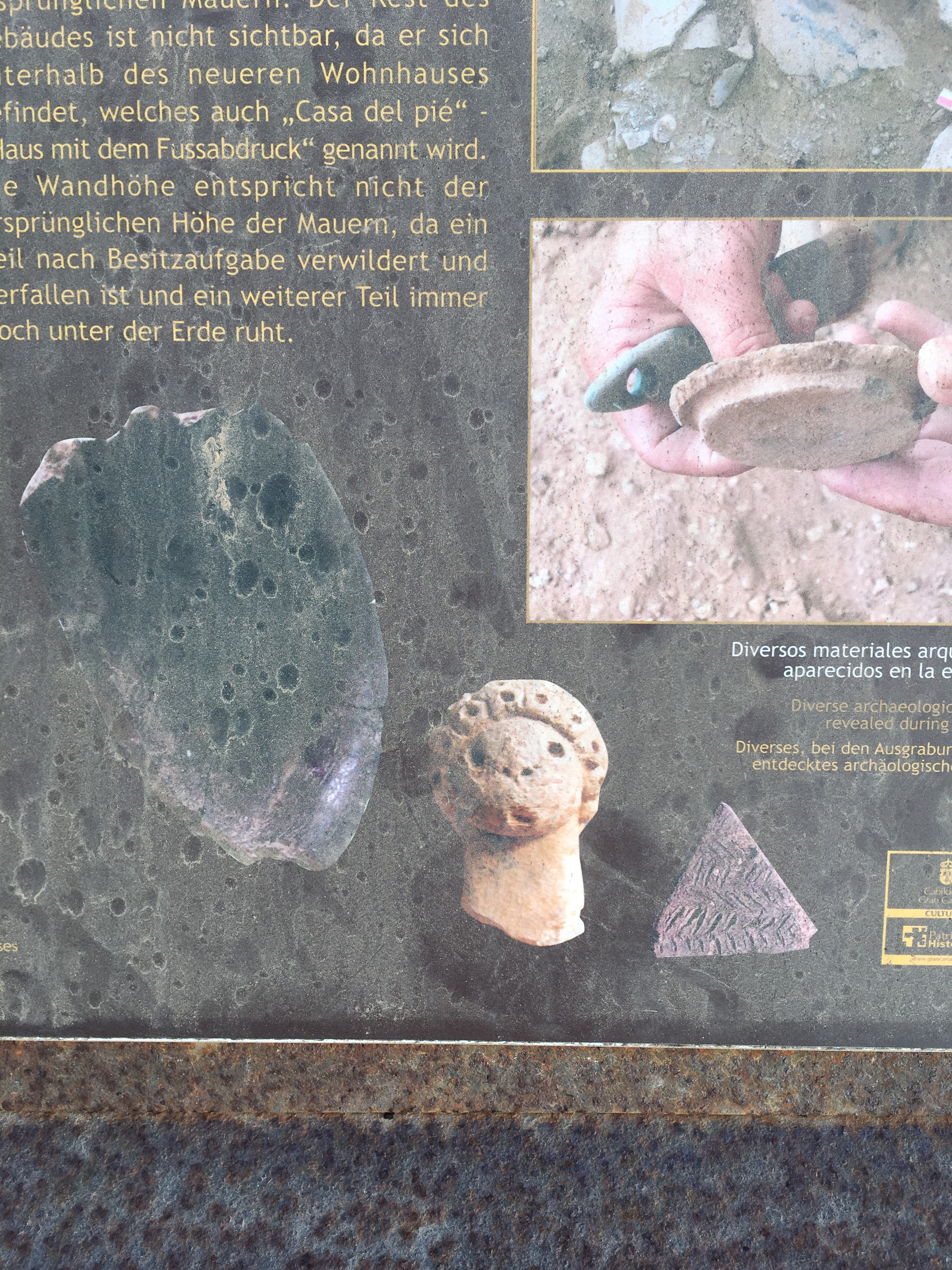
A selection of artefacts unearthed from the Lomo de los Gatos site on Gran Canaria

As José Farrujia describes, "The indigenous Canarians lived mainly in natural caves, usually near the coast, 300 to 500 metres (1,000 to 1,600 ft) above sea level. These caves were sometimes isolated but more commonly formed settlements, with burial caves nearby". Archaeological work has uncovered a rich culture visible through artefacts of ceramics, human figures, fishing, hunting and farming tools, plant fibre clothing and vessels, as well as cave paintings. At Lomo de los Gatos on Gran Canaria, a site occupied from 1,600 years ago up until the 1960s, round stone houses, complex burial sites, and associated artefacts have been found. Across the islands are thousands of Libyco-Berber alphabet inscriptions that have been extensively documented by many linguists.

The social structure of indigenous Canarians encompassed "a system of matrilineal descent in most of the islands, in which inheritance was passed on via the female line. Social status and wealth were hereditary and determined the individual's position in the social pyramid, which consisted of the king, the relatives of the king, the lower nobility, villeins, plebeians, and finally executioners, butchers, embalmers, and prisoners". Their religion was animist, centring on the sun and moon, as well as natural features such as mountains.

=== Exploration ===
The islands may have been visited by the Phoenicians, the Greeks, and the Carthaginians. King Juba II, Caesar Augustus's Numidian protégé, is credited with discovering the islands for the Western world. According to Pliny the Elder, Juba found the islands uninhabited, but found "a small temple of stone" and "some traces of buildings". Juba dispatched a naval contingent to re-open the dye production facility at Mogador in what is now western Morocco in the early first century AD. That same naval force was subsequently sent on an exploration of the Canary Islands, using Mogador as their mission base.

The names given by Romans to the individual islands were Ninguaria or Nivaria (Tenerife), Canaria (Gran Canaria), Pluvialia or Invale (Lanzarote), Ombrion (La Palma), Planasia (Fuerteventura), Iunonia or Junonia (El Hierro) and Capraria (La Gomera).

From the 14th century onward, numerous visits were made by sailors from Mallorca, Portugal, and Genoa. Lancelotto Malocello settled on Lanzarote in 1312. The Mallorcans established a mission with a bishop in the islands that lasted from 1350 to 1400.

=== Castilian conquest ===
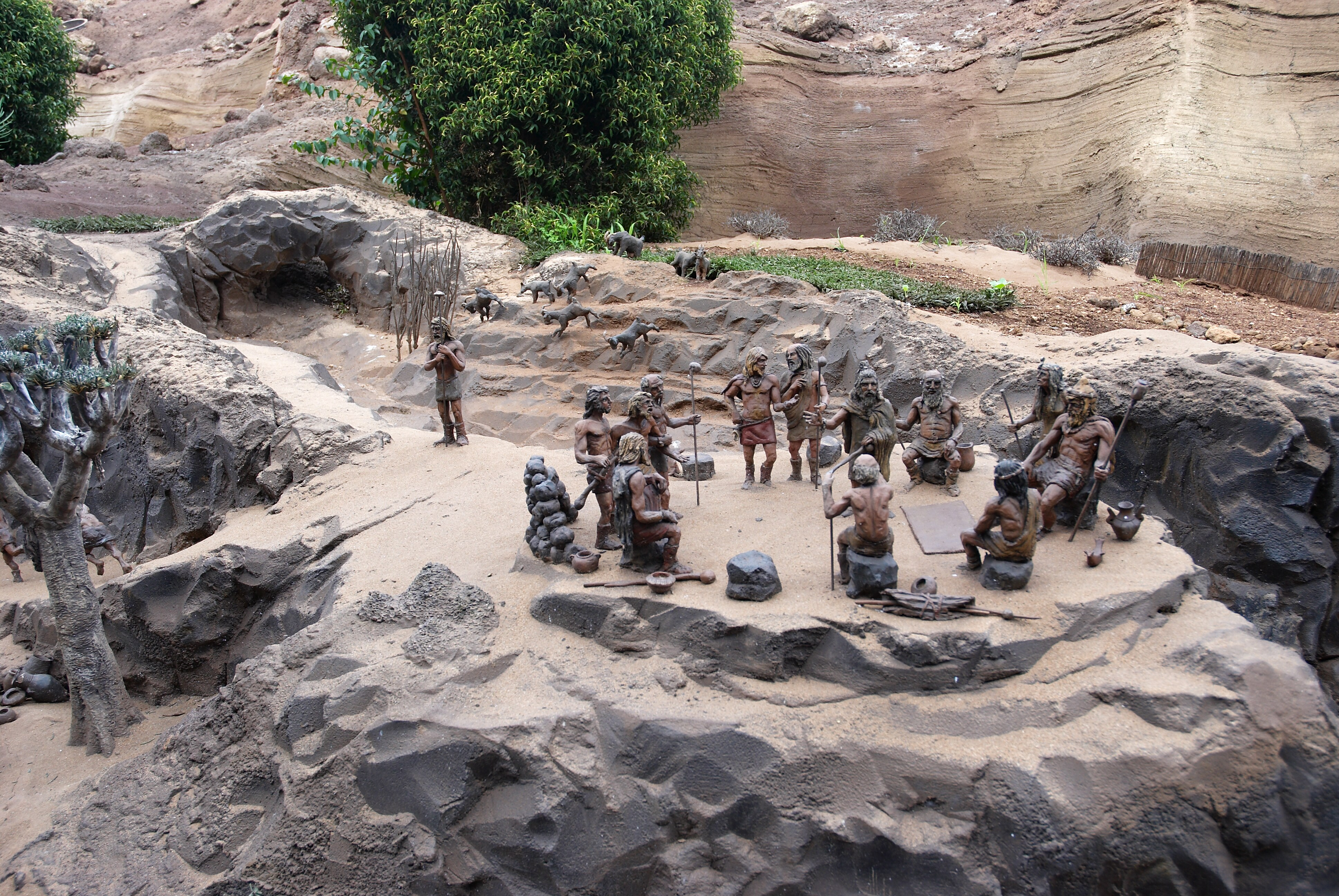
Reconstruction of a Guanche settlement of Tenerife

In 1402, the Castilian colonisation of the islands began with the expedition of the French explorers Jean de Béthencourt and Gadifer de la Salle, nobles and vassals of Henry III of Castile, to Lanzarote. From there, they went on to conquer Fuerteventura (1405) and El Hierro. These invasions were "brutal cultural and military clashes between the indigenous population and the Castilians" lasting over a century due to formidable resistance by indigenous Canarians. Some scholars, such as Mohamed Adhikari, describe the conquest of the islands as a genocide of the Guanches.

Béthencourt received the title King of the Canary Islands, but still recognised King Henry III as his overlord. It was not a simple military enterprise, given the aboriginal resistance on some islands. Neither was it politically, since the particular interests of the nobility (determined to strengthen their economic and political power through the acquisition of the islands) conflicted with those of the states, particularly Castile, which were in the midst of territorial expansion and in a process of strengthening of the crown against the nobility.

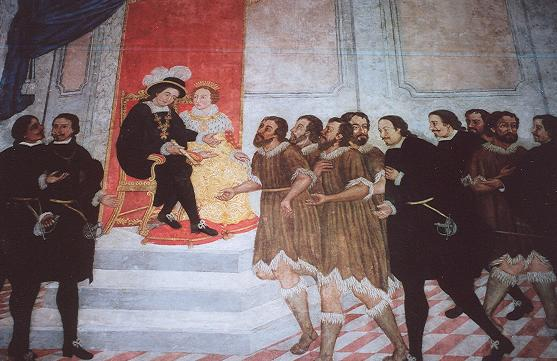
Alonso Fernández de Lugo presenting the captured native Guanche kings of Tenerife to the Catholic Monarchs

Historians distinguish two periods in the conquest of the Canary Islands:

Aristocratic conquest (conquista señorial): This refers to the early conquests carried out by the nobility, for their own benefit and without the direct participation of the Crown of Castile, which merely granted rights of conquest in exchange for pacts of vassalage between the noble conqueror and the Crown. One can identify within this period an early phase known as the Betancurian or Norman conquest, carried out by Jean de Bethencourt (who was originally from Normandy) and Gadifer de la Salle between 1402 and 1405, which involved the islands of Lanzarote, El Hierro, and Fuerteventura. The subsequent phase is known as the Castilian conquest, carried out by Castilian nobles who acquired, through purchases, assignments and marriages, the previously conquered islands and also incorporated the island of La Gomera around 1450.

Royal conquest (conquista realenga): This defines the conquest between 1478 and 1496, carried out directly by the Crown of Castile, during the reign of the Catholic Monarchs, who armed and partly financed the conquest of those islands which were still unconquered: Gran Canaria, La Palma and Tenerife. This phase of the conquest came to an end in the year 1496, with the dominion of the island of Tenerife, bringing the entire Canarian Archipelago under the control of the Crown of Castile.

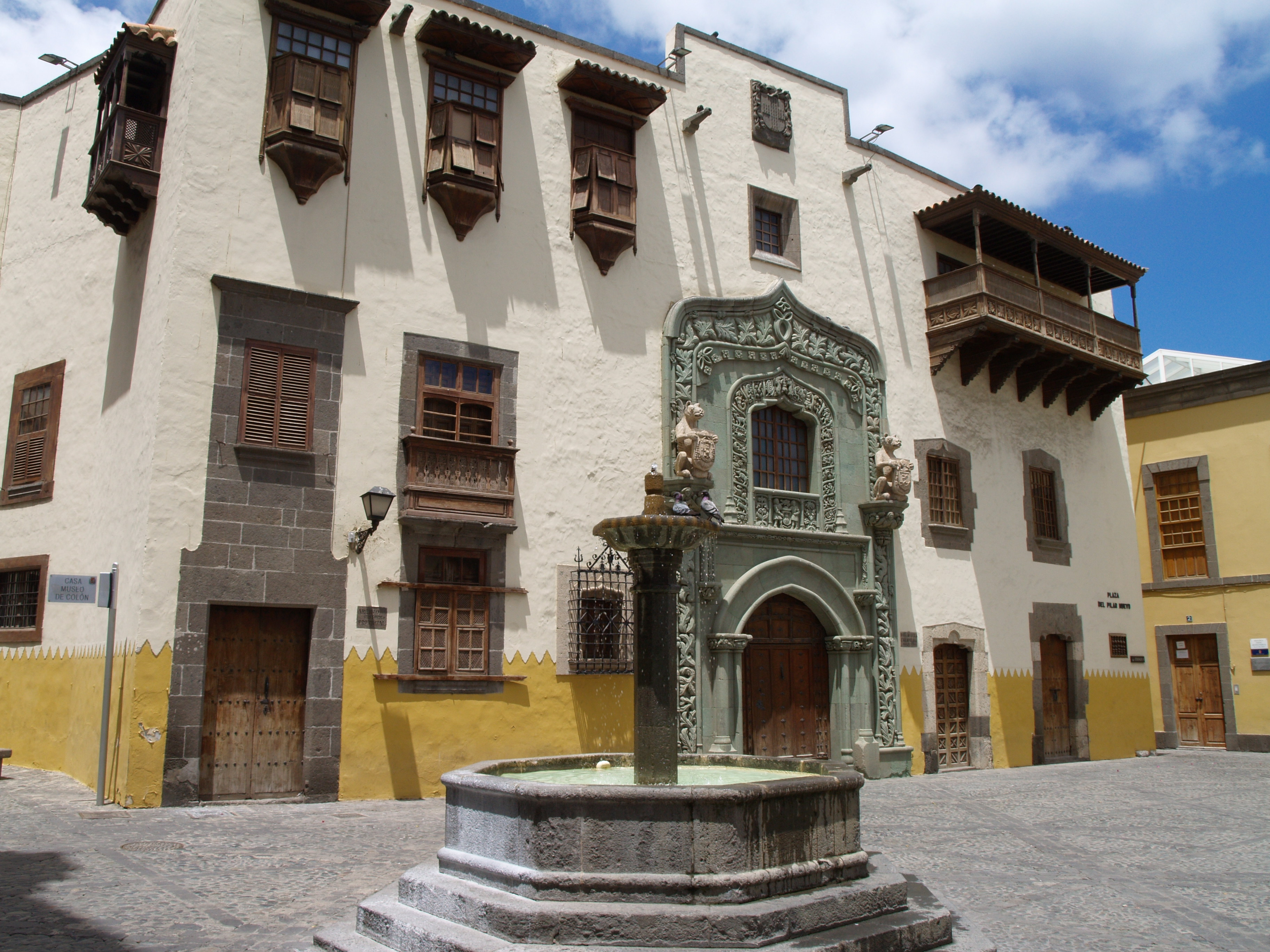
Casa de Colón (Las Palmas de Gran Canaria), which Christopher Columbus visited during his first trip

Béthencourt also established a base on the island of La Gomera, but it would be many years before the island was fully conquered. The natives of La Gomera, and of Gran Canaria, Tenerife, and La Palma, resisted the Castilian invaders for almost a century. In 1448, Maciot de Béthencourt sold the lordship of Lanzarote to Portugal's Prince Henry the Navigator, an action that was accepted by neither the natives nor the Castilians. Despite Pope Nicholas V ruling that the Canary Islands were under Portuguese control, the crisis swelled to a revolt which lasted until 1459 with the final expulsion of the Portuguese. In 1479, Portugal and Castile signed the Treaty of Alcáçovas, which settled disputes between Castile and Portugal over the control of the Atlantic. This treaty recognised Castilian control of the Canary Islands but also confirmed Portuguese possession of the Azores, Madeira, and the Cape Verde islands, and gave the Portuguese rights to any further islands or lands in the Atlantic that might be discovered.

The Castilians continued to dominate the islands, but due to the topography and the resistance of the native Guanches, they did not achieve complete control until 1496, when Tenerife and La Palma were finally subdued by Alonso Fernández de Lugo. As a result of this "the native pre-Hispanic population declined quickly due to war, epidemics, and slavery". The Canaries were incorporated into the Kingdom of Castile.

=== After the conquest and the introduction of slavery ===
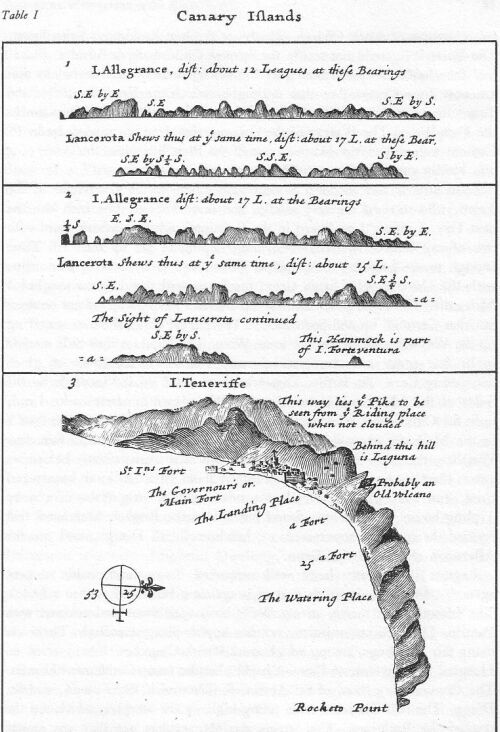
Maps of the Canary Islands drawn by William Dampier during his voyage to New Holland in 1699

Coat of arms of the Castilian and Spanish Realm of Canary Islands

After the conquest, the Castilians imposed a new economic model, based on single-crop cultivation: first sugarcane; then wine, an important item of trade with England. Gran Canaria was conquered by the Crown of Castile on 6 March 1480, and Tenerife was conquered in 1496, and each had its own governor. There has been speculation that the abundance of Roccella tinctoria on the Canary Islands offered a profit motive for Jean de Béthencourt during his conquest of the islands. Lichen has been used for centuries to make dyes. This includes royal purple colors derived from R. tinctoria, also known as orseille.

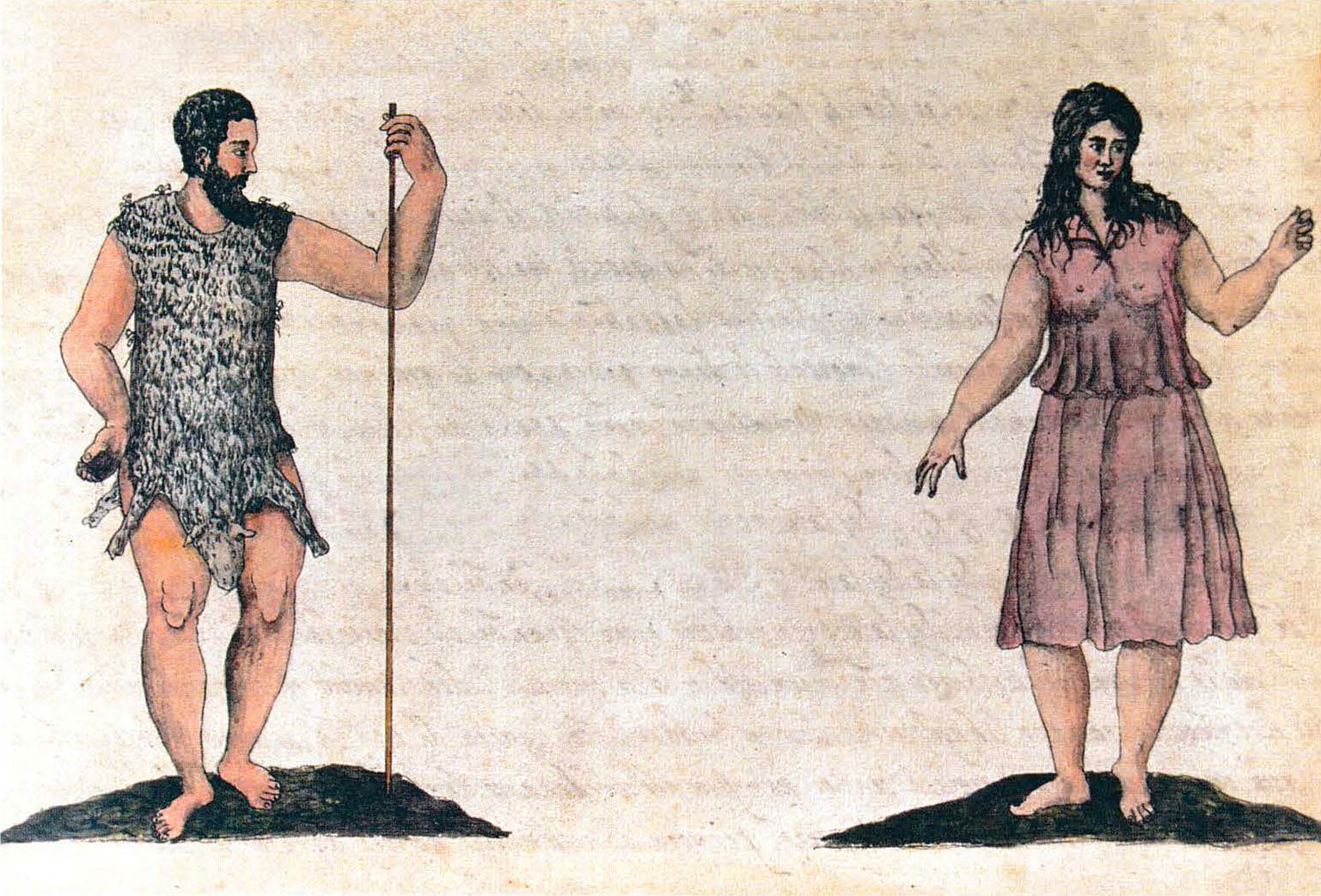
Painting of Bimbache of El Hierro by Leonardo Torriani, 1592

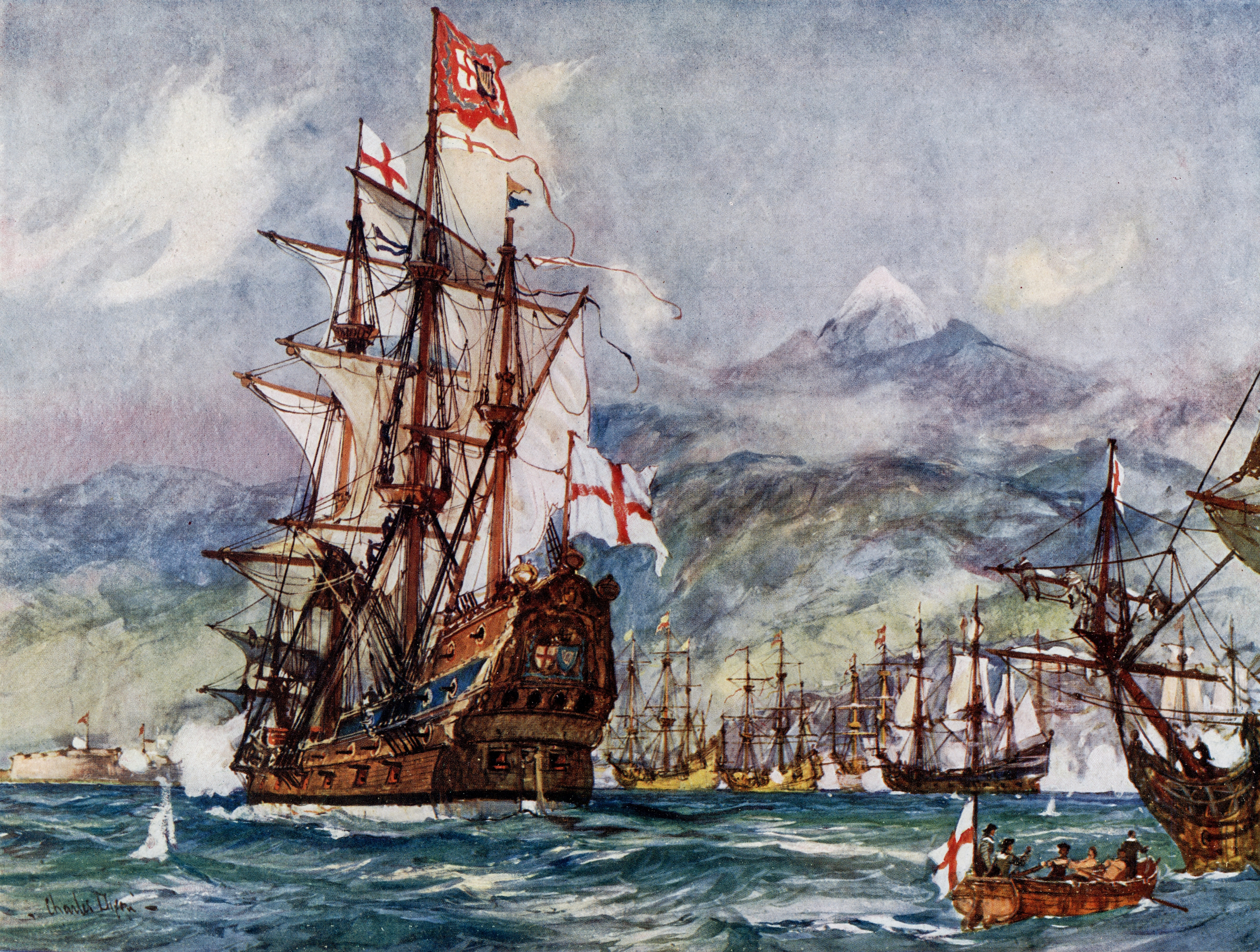
Robert Blake's flagship at the Battle of Santa Cruz de Tenerife during the Anglo-Spanish War, 1657

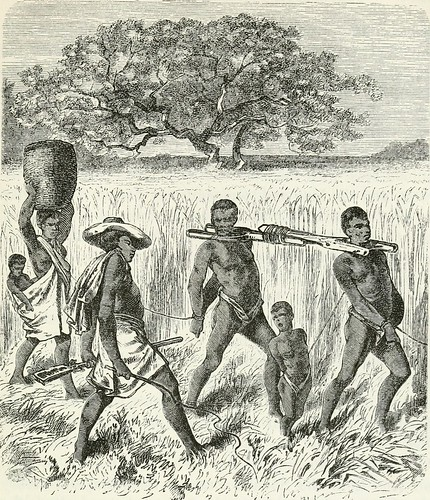
Slave-driving in the interior of Africa in order to sell into enforced labour

The objective of the Spanish Crown to convert the islands into a powerhouse of cultivation required a much larger labour force. This was attained through a practice of enslavement, not only of indigenous Canarians, but large numbers of Africans who were taken from North and Sub-Saharan Africa. Whilst the first slave plantations in the Atlantic region were across Madeira, Cape Verde, and the Canary Islands, it was only the Canary Islands which had an indigenous population and were therefore invaded rather than newly occupied.

Because this agriculture industry was largely based on sugarcane, the Castilians converted large swaths of the landscape for sugarcane production and the processing and manufacturing of sugar, largely enabled by slave labour. The cities of Santa Cruz de Tenerife and Las Palmas de Gran Canaria became a stopping point for the Spanish traders, as well as conquistadors, and missionaries on their way to the New World. This trade route brought great wealth to the Castilian social sectors of the islands and soon were attracting merchants and adventurers from all over Europe. As wealth increased, enslaved Africans were also forced into more domestic roles for the richer Castilians on the islands.

Research on the skeletons of some of the enslaved from the burial site of Finca Clavijo on Gran Canaria has shown that "all of the adults buried in Finca Clavijo undertook extensive physical activity that involved significant stress on the spine and appendicular skeleton", a result of relentless hard labour, akin to the physical abnormalities found within other enslaved groups from sugarcane plantations around the world.

As a result of the wealth generated, palaces and churches were built on La Palma during this busy and prosperous period. The Church of El Salvador survives as one of the island's finest examples of the architecture of the 16th century. Civilian architecture survives in forms such as Casas de los Sánchez-Ochando or Casa Quintana.

The Canaries' wealth invited attacks by pirates and privateers. Ottoman Turkish admiral and privateer Kemal Reis ventured into the Canaries in 1501, while Murat Reis the Elder captured Lanzarote in 1585.

The most severe attack took place in 1599, during the Dutch Revolt. A Dutch fleet of 74 ships and 12,000 men, commanded by Pieter van der Does, attacked the capital Las Palmas de Gran Canaria (the city had 3,500 of Gran Canaria's 8,545 inhabitants). The Dutch attacked the Castillo de la Luz, which guarded the harbor. The Canarians evacuated civilians from the city, and the Castillo surrendered (but not the city). The Dutch moved inland, but Canarian cavalry drove them back to Tamaraceite, near the city.

The Dutch then laid siege to the city, demanding the surrender of all its wealth. They received 12 sheep and 3 calves. Furious, the Dutch sent 4,000 soldiers to attack the Council of the Canaries, who were sheltering in the village of Santa Brígida. Three hundred Canarian soldiers ambushed the Dutch in the village of Monte Lentiscal, killing 150 and forcing the rest to retreat. The Dutch concentrated on Las Palmas de Gran Canaria, attempting to burn it down. The Dutch pillaged Maspalomas, on the southern coast of Gran Canaria, San Sebastián on La Gomera, and Santa Cruz on La Palma, but eventually gave up the siege of Las Palmas and withdrew.

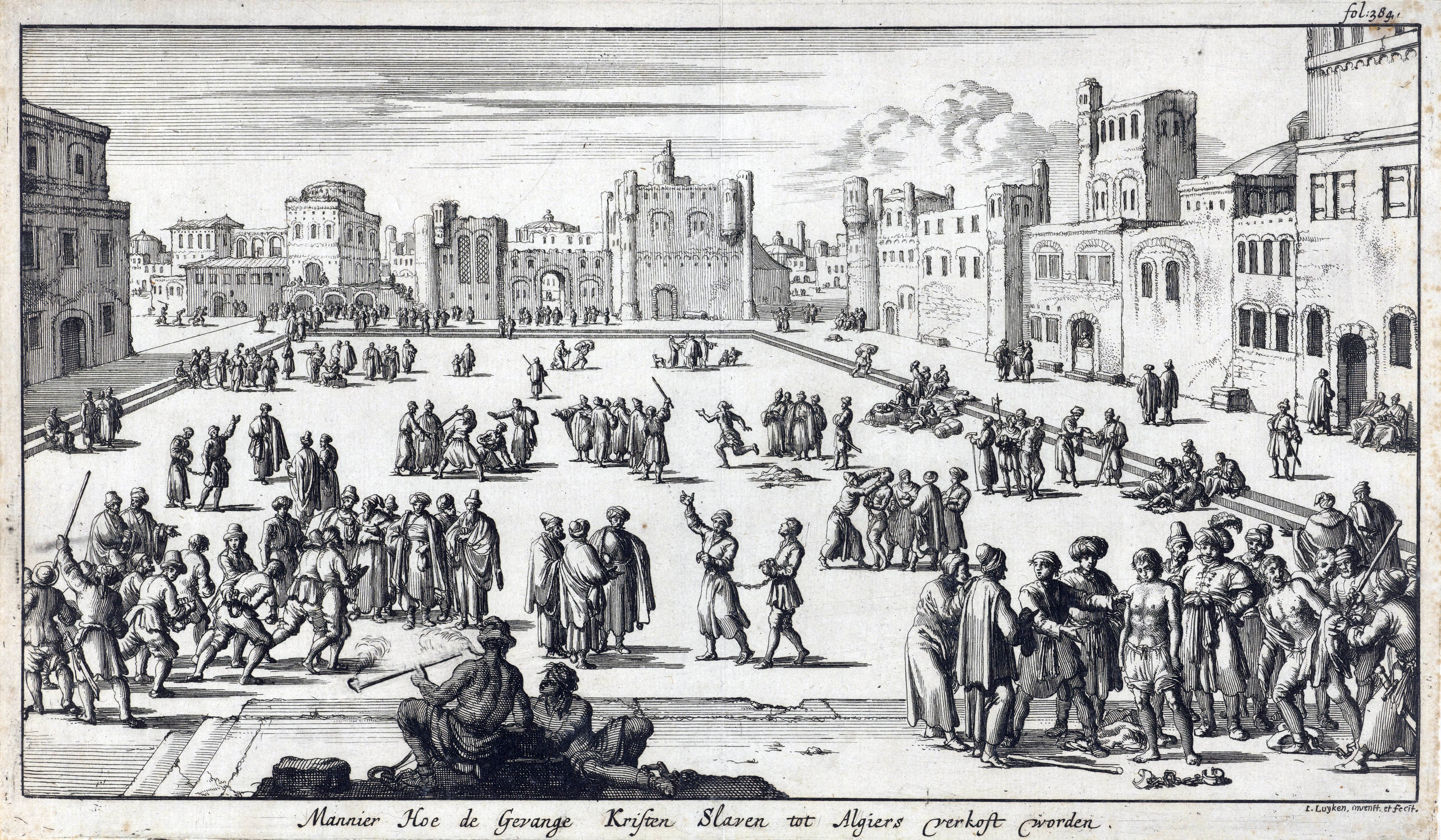
Christian prisoners are sold as slaves in a square in Algiers. Barbary pirates captured almost 2,000 Canarians during four invasions between 1569 and 1618.

In 1618 the Barbary pirates from North Africa attacked Lanzarote and La Gomera taking 1000 captives to be sold as slaves. Another noteworthy attack occurred in 1797, when Santa Cruz de Tenerife was attacked by a British fleet under Horatio Nelson on 25 July. The British were repulsed, losing almost 400 men. It was during this battle that Nelson lost his right arm.

Santa Cruz de Tenerife was, especially during the first half of the 18th century, the most important corsair center in the Macaronesian region. The recent discovery of abundant documentary evidence of significant corsair activity, carried out primarily by natives, residents, and those living on the island, confirms this fact. At the same time, the numerous pirate ships that frequented the Canary Islands waters used landing places along its coast. Such was the case of Valle de Salazar or San Andrés, which had acquired a reputation as a "pirate port" until the construction of its castle or defensive tower.

Aside from the pirates and privateers who attacked the islands, the archipelago also gave rise to native privateers who defended their own coasts or those of the Spanish Empire, especially in the Caribbean. Among these, we can highlight the figure of Amaro Pargo, a privateer and merchant from Tenerife, who participated in the Spanish treasure fleet (the Spanish-Hispanic American trade route) in the 18th century, attacking enemy ships of Spain both in Canary waters and along the coasts of the New World.

Apart from the passage of Christopher Columbus, the Canary Islands were the site of some of the most important fleets in Western history. Such as the fleet of the Virginia Company in 1606, which marked the foundation of Fort Jamestown -the first permanent English settlement in what is now the United States- and the passage of the First Fleet through Tenerife, which marked the first European settlement in Australia in Botany Bay.

=== 18th to 19th century: trade with Hispanic America and emigration ===
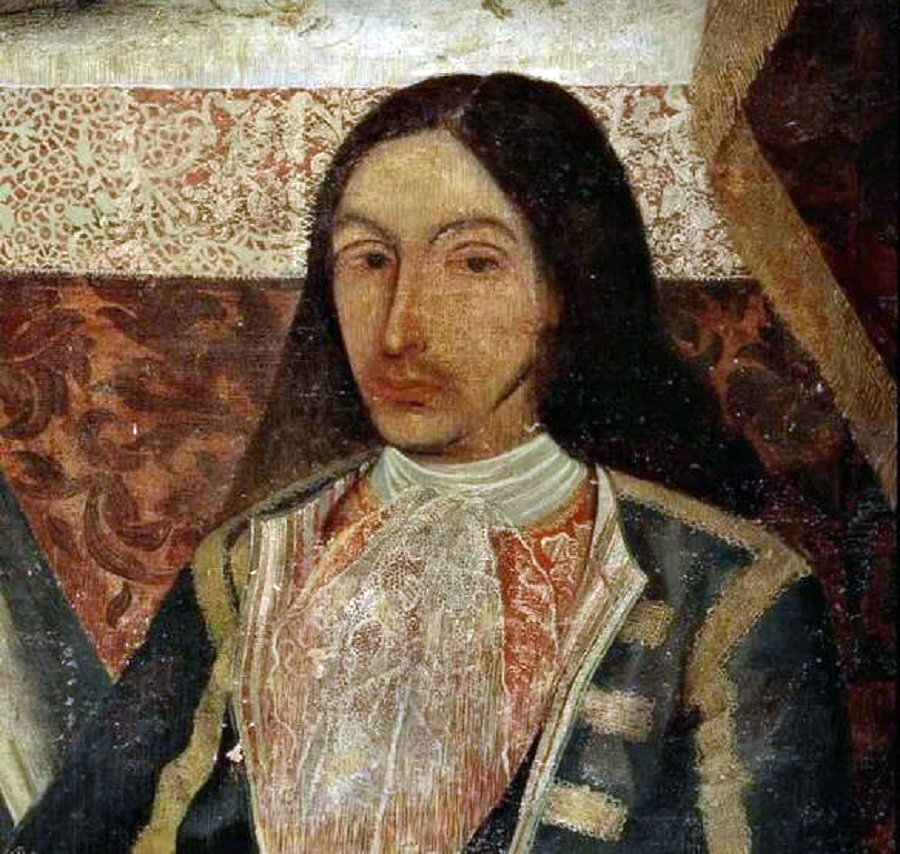
Amaro Pargo (1678–1741), corsair and merchant from Tenerife who participated in the Spanish treasure fleet, the Spanish-American trade route

The sugar-based economy of the islands faced stiff competition from Spain's Caribbean colonies. Low sugar prices in the 19th century caused severe recessions on the islands. A new cash crop, cochineal (cochinilla), came into cultivation during this time, reinvigorating the islands' economy. During this time the Canarian-American trade was developed, in which Canarian products such as cochineal, sugarcane and rum were sold in American ports such as Veracruz, Campeche, La Guaira and Havana, among others.

By the end of the 18th century, Canary Islanders had already emigrated to Spanish American territories, such as Havana, Veracruz, and Santo Domingo, San Antonio, Texas and St. Bernard Parish, Louisiana. These economic difficulties spurred mass emigration during the 19th and first half of the 20th century, primarily to the Americas. Between 1840 and 1890 as many as 40,000 Canary Islanders emigrated to Venezuela. Also, thousands of Canarians moved to Puerto Rico where the Spanish monarchy felt that Canarians would adapt to island life better than other immigrants from the mainland of Spain. Deeply entrenched traditions, such as the Mascaras Festival in the town of Hatillo, Puerto Rico, are an example of Canarian culture still preserved in Puerto Rico. Similarly, many thousands of Canarians emigrated to the shores of Cuba. During the Spanish–American War of 1898, the Spanish fortified the islands against a possible American attack, but no such event took place.

=== Romantic period and scientific expeditions ===
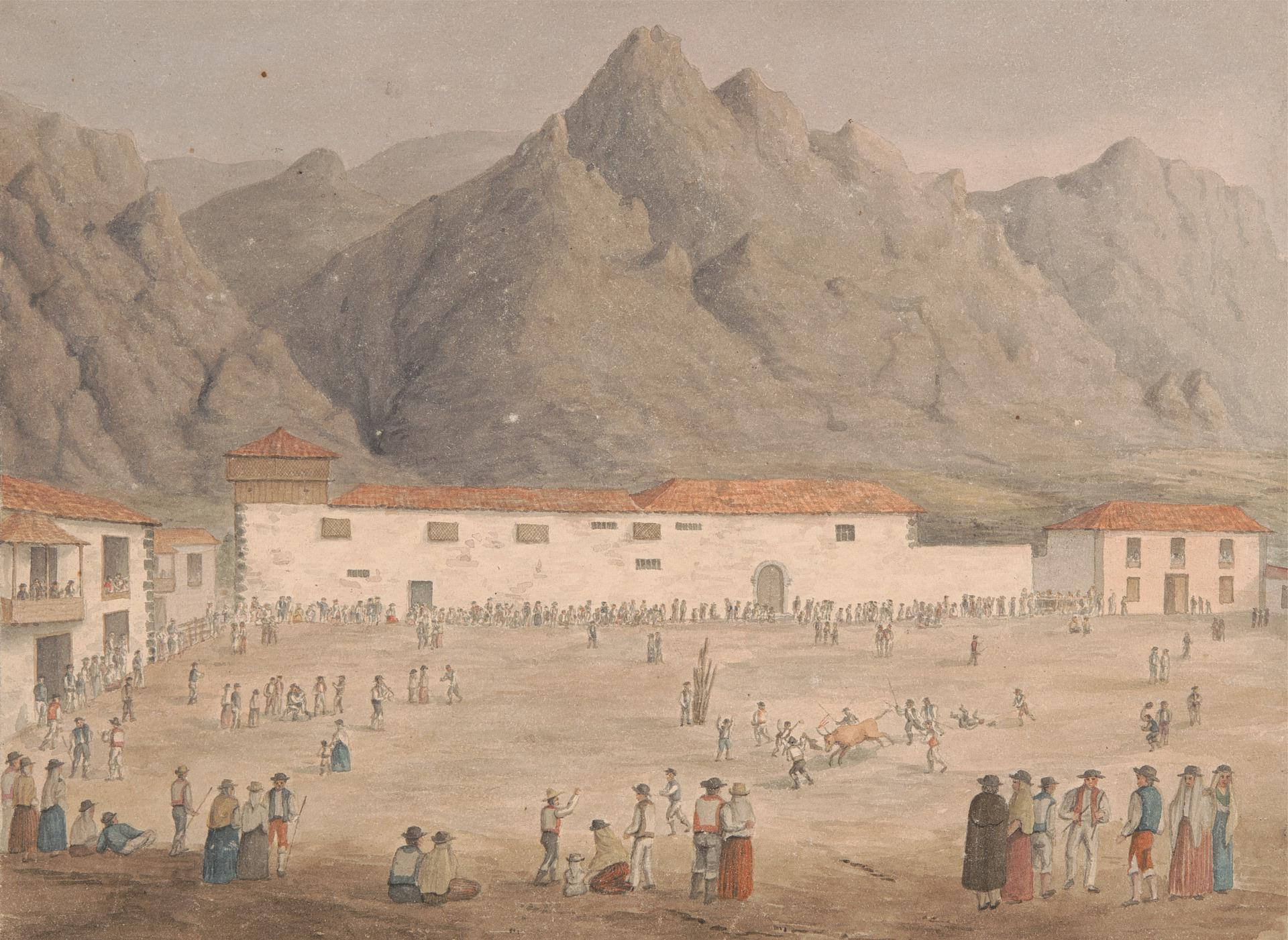
Square in the village of Los Silos, Tenerife, by Alfred Diston, 1827

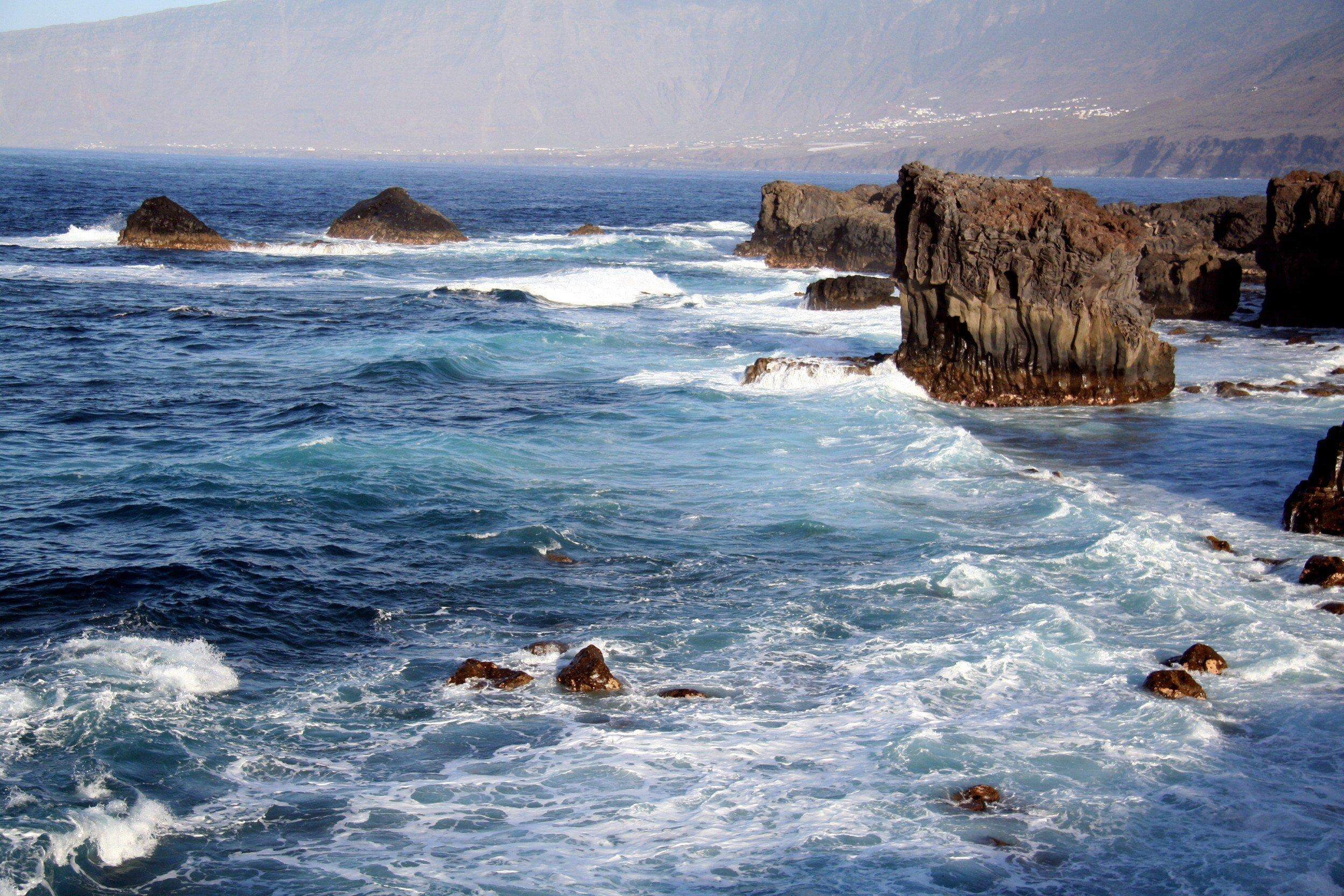
Coast El Golfo, El Hierro

Sirera and Renn (2004) distinguish two different types of expeditions, or voyages, during the period 1770–1830, which they term "the Romantic period":

First are "expeditions financed by the States, closely related with the official scientific Institutions. characterised by having strict scientific objectives (and inspired by) the spirit of Illustration and progress". In this type of expedition, Sirera and Renn include the following travellers:

- J. Edens, whose 1715 ascent and observations of Mt. Teide influenced many subsequent expeditions.
- Louis Feuillée (1724), who was sent to measure the meridian of El Hierro and to map the islands.
- Jean-Charles de Borda (1771, 1776) who more accurately measured the longitudes of the islands and the height of Mount Teide
- the Baudin-Ledru expedition (1796) which aimed to recover a valuable collection of natural history objects.

The second type of expedition identified by Sirera and Renn is one that took place starting from more or less private initiatives. Among these, the key exponents were the following:

- Alexander von Humboldt (1799)
- Buch and Smith (1815)
- Broussonet
- Webb
- Sabin Berthelot.

Sirera and Renn identify the period 1770–1830 as one in which "In a panorama dominated until that moment by France and England enters with strength and brio Germany of the Romantic period whose presence in the islands will increase".

=== Early 20th century ===
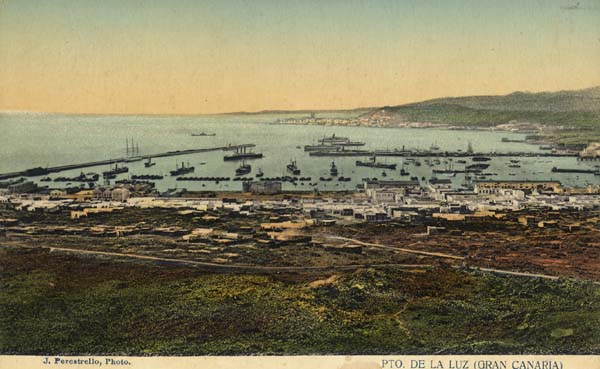
The port of Las Palmas in 1912

At the beginning of the 20th century, the British introduced a new cash-crop, the banana, the export of which was controlled by companies such as Fyffes.

30 November 1833 the Province of Canary Islands had been created with the capital being declared as Santa Cruz de Tenerife. The rivalry between the cities of Las Palmas de Gran Canaria and Santa Cruz de Tenerife for the capital of the islands led to the division of the archipelago into two provinces on 23 September 1927.

During the time of the Second Spanish Republic, Marxist and anarchist workers' movements began to develop, led by figures such as Jose Miguel Perez and Guillermo Ascanio. However, outside of a few municipalities, these organisations were a minority and fell easily to Nationalist forces during the Spanish Civil War.

=== Franco regime ===
In 1936, Francisco Franco was appointed General Commandant of the Canaries. He joined the military revolt of 17 July which began the Spanish Civil War. Franco quickly took control of the archipelago, except for a few points of resistance on La Palma and in the town of Vallehermoso, on La Gomera. Though there was never a war in the islands, the post-war suppression of political dissent on the Canaries was most severe.

During the Second World War, Winston Churchill prepared plans for the British seizure of the Canary Islands as a naval base, in the event of Gibraltar being invaded from the Spanish mainland. (Note: "So great was the danger that for nearly two years we kept constantly at a few days' notice an expedition of over five thousand men and their ships, ready to seize the Canary Islands, by which we could maintain air and sea control over the U-boats, and contact with Australasia round the Cape, if ever the harbour of Gibraltar were denied to us by the Spaniards.") The planned operation was known as Operation Pilgrim.

Opposition to Franco's regime did not begin to organise until the late 1950s, which experienced an upheaval of parties such as the Communist Party of Spain and the formation of various nationalist, leftist parties.

During the Ifni War, the Franco regime set up concentration camps on the islands to extrajudicially imprison those in Western Sahara suspected of disloyalty to Spain, many of whom were colonial troops recruited on the spot but were later deemed to be potential fifth columnists and deported to the Canary Islands. These camps were characterised by the use of forced labour for infrastructure projects and highly unsanitary conditions resulting in the widespread occurrence of tuberculosis.

=== Self-governance ===
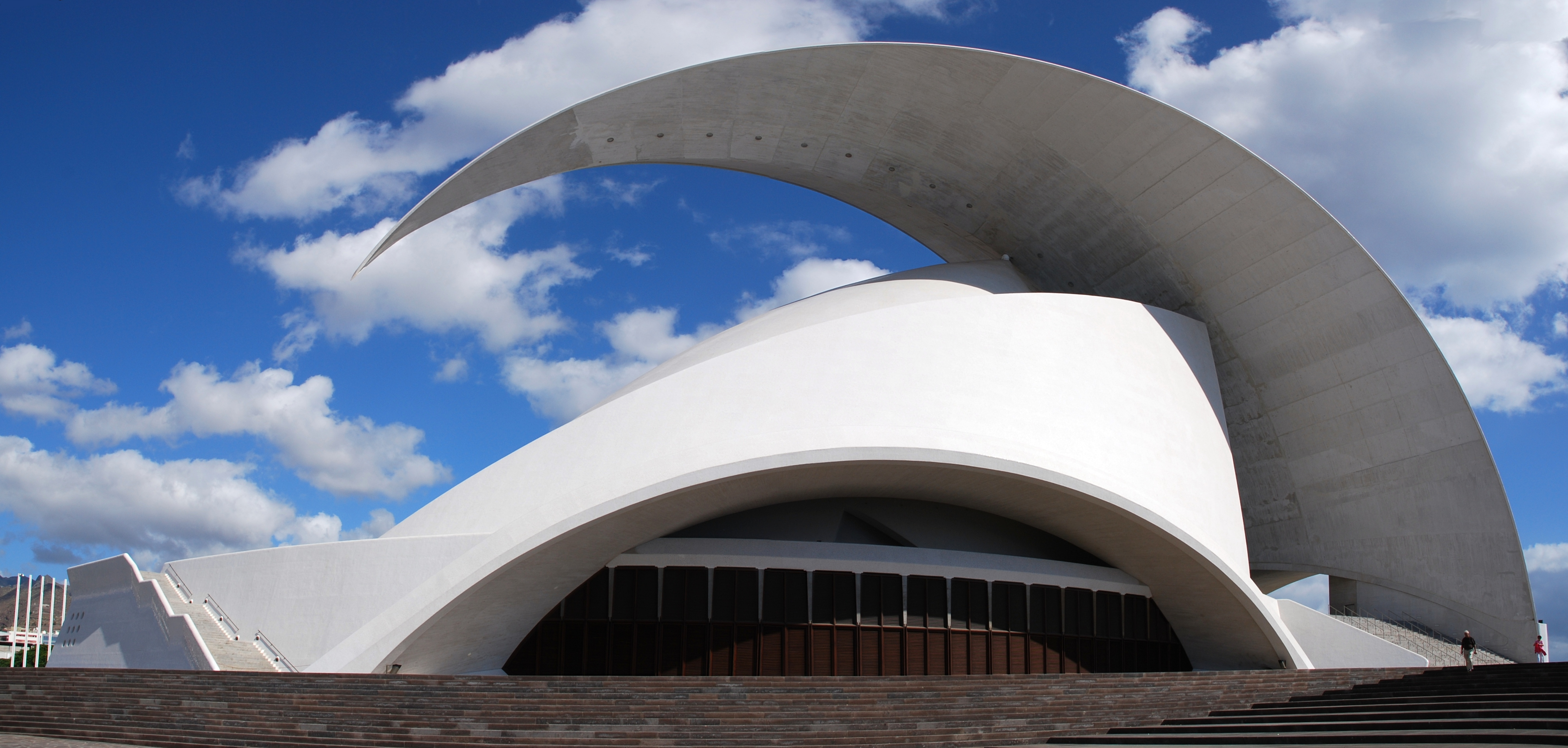
Auditorio de Tenerife by Santiago Calatrava, and an icon of contemporary architecture in the Canary Islands, (Santa Cruz de Tenerife)

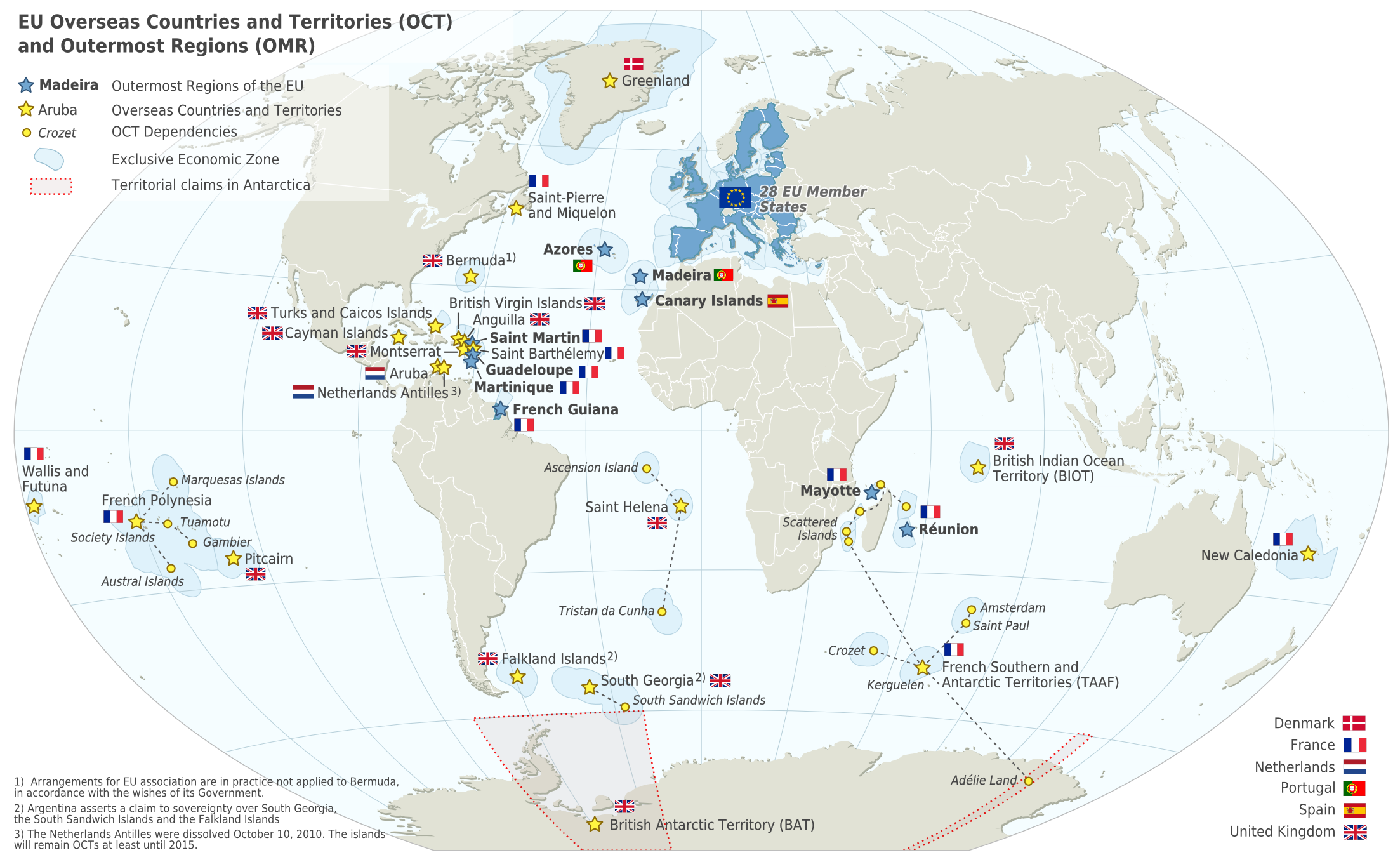
Map of the European Union in the world with overseas countries and territories and outermost regions (as of 2018), with a few French and Spanish territories missing.

After the death of Franco, there was a pro-independence armed movement based in Algeria, the Movement for the Independence and Self-determination of the Canaries Archipelago (MAIAC). In 1968, the Organisation of African Unity recognised the MAIAC as a legitimate African independence movement, and declared the Canary Islands as an African territory still under foreign rule.

=== Modern history ===
The archipelago experienced a period of Canarian nationalism during the 1970s, aiming to achieve autonomy or independence.

Since August 16, 1982, the Canary Islands have been established as one of Spain's seventeen autonomous communities, with the capital shared between the cities of Santa Cruz de Tenerife and Las Palmas de Gran Canaria. The seat of the President of the Government alternates between the two cities with each four-year legislative term. The Parliament of the Canary Islands has its permanent seat in Santa Cruz de Tenerife.

Since 1992, the Canary Islands have been an outermost region of the European Union.

The Canary Islands have become one of the European Union's busiest migration frontiers in recent years. The archipelago is often the first European territory reached by migrants and refugees departing from countries such as Senegal, Mauritania, Mali and Gambia. The Atlantic route is considered one of the world's most dangerous migration corridors. For this reason, Pope Leo XIV visited Canary Islands on June, 2026, marking the final leg of his historic apostolic journey to Spain to spotlight of irregular migrants crossing the Atlantic ocean.

== Geography ==
A map of the Canary Islands

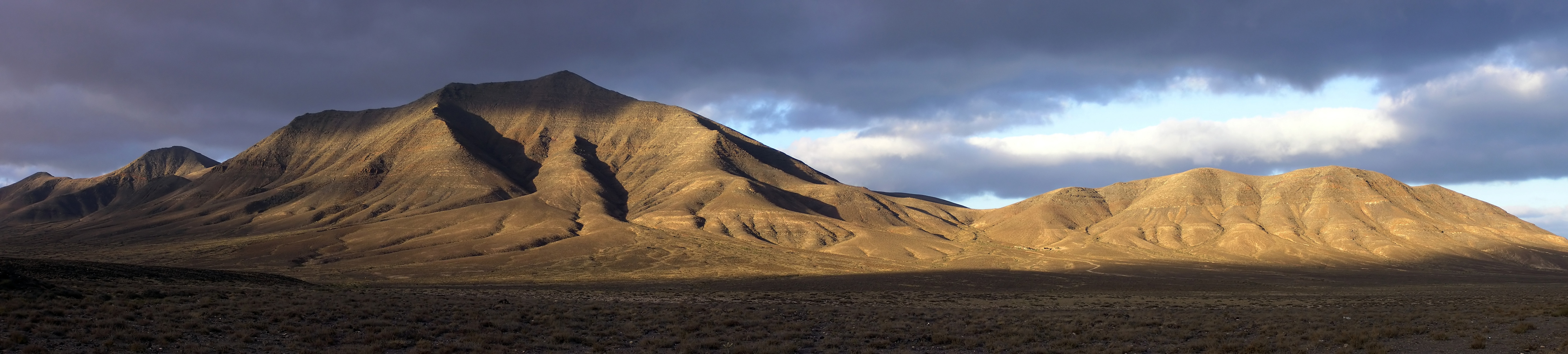
Hacha Grande, a mountain in the south of Lanzarote, viewed from the road to the Playa de Papagayo

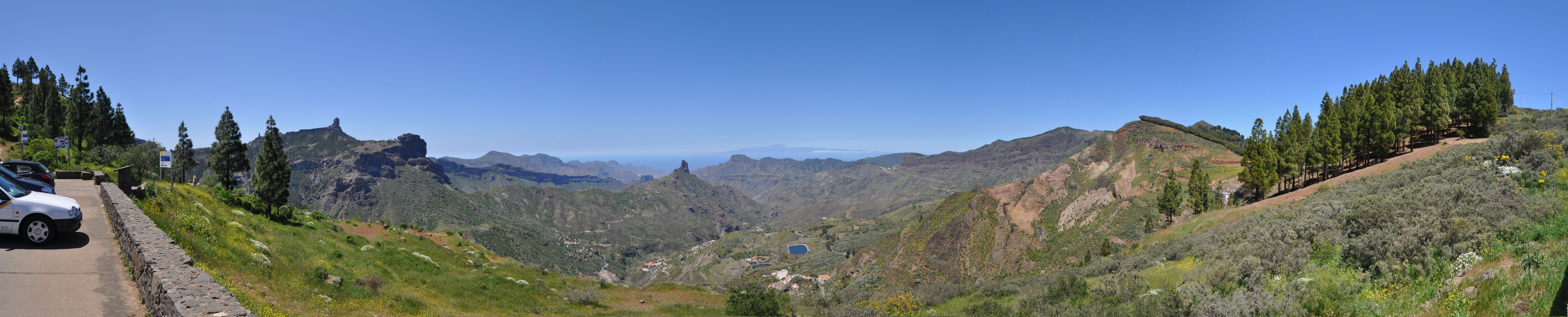
A panoramic view of Gran Canaria, with Roque Nublo at the left and Roque Bentayga at the center

Tenerife is the largest and most populous island of the archipelago. Gran Canaria, with 865,070 inhabitants, is both the Canary Islands' second most populous island, and the third most populous one in Spain after Tenerife (966,354 inhabitants) and Mallorca (896,038 inhabitants). The island of Fuerteventura is the second largest in the archipelago and located 100 km (62 mi) from the African coast.

The islands form the Macaronesia ecoregion with the Azores, Cape Verde, Madeira, and the Savage Isles. The Canary Islands constitute the largest and most populated archipelago of the Macaronesia region. The archipelago has seven large and several smaller islands, all of which are volcanic in origin.

According to the position of the islands with respect to the north-east trade winds, the climate can be mild and wet or very dry. Several native species form laurisilva forests.

The individual islands in the Canary archipelago tend to have distinct microclimates. Those islands such as El Hierro, La Palma and La Gomera lying to the west of the archipelago have a climate which is influenced by the moist Canary Current. They are well vegetated even at low levels and have extensive tracts of sub-tropical laurisilva forest. Travelling east toward the African coast, the influence of the current diminishes, and the islands become increasingly arid. Fuerteventura and Lanzarote, the islands which are closest to the African mainland, are effectively desert or semi-desert.

Gran Canaria is known as a "continent in miniature" for its diverse landscapes like Maspalomas and Roque Nublo. The north of Tenerife lies under the influence of the moist Atlantic winds and is well vegetated. The south of the island around the tourist resorts of Playa de las Américas and Los Cristianos is arid. The island rises to almost 4,000 m (13,000 ft) above sea level. At altitude, in the cool relatively wet climate, forests of the endemic pine Pinus canariensis thrive. Many of the plant species in the Canary Islands, like the Canary Island pine and the dragon tree, Dracaena draco are endemic, as noted by Sabin Berthelot and Philip Barker Webb in their work, L'Histoire Naturelle des Îles Canaries (1835–50).

=== Climate ===
The Canary Islands are considered tropical and generally arid, moderated by the sea and in summer by the trade winds. It is the northernmost location with a tropical climate, having all its monthly average temperatures above 18° C/64.4° F There are a number of microclimates and the classifications range mainly from semi-desert to desert. The majority of the Canary Islands have a hot desert climate (BWh) and a hot semi-desert climate (BSh) within the Köppen system, caused partly due to the cool Canary Current. A subtropical humid climate, which is very influenced by the ocean, is in the middle of the islands of La Gomera, Tenerife and La Palma, where laurisilva cloud forests grow.

Climate data for Santa Cruz de Tenerife 35m (1981–2010 normals)
Month	Jan	Feb	Mar	Apr	May	Jun	Jul	Aug	Sep	Oct	Nov	Dec	Year
Mean daily maximum °C (°F)	21.0 (69.8)	21.2 (70.2)	22.1 (71.8)	22.7 (72.9)	24.1 (75.4)	26.2 (79.2)	28.7 (83.7)	29.0 (84.2)	28.1 (82.6)	26.3 (79.3)	24.1 (75.4)	22.1 (71.8)	24.6 (76.3)
Daily mean °C (°F)	18.2 (64.8)	18.3 (64.9)	19.0 (66.2)	19.7 (67.5)	21.0 (69.8)	22.9 (73.2)	25.0 (77.0)	25.5 (77.9)	24.9 (76.8)	23.4 (74.1)	21.3 (70.3)	19.4 (66.9)	21.5 (70.7)
Mean daily minimum °C (°F)	15.4 (59.7)	15.3 (59.5)	15.9 (60.6)	16.5 (61.7)	17.8 (64.0)	19.5 (67.1)	21.2 (70.2)	21.9 (71.4)	21.7 (71.1)	20.3 (68.5)	18.4 (65.1)	16.6 (61.9)	18.4 (65.1)
Average rainfall mm (inches)	31.5 (1.24)	35.4 (1.39)	37.8 (1.49)	11.6 (0.46)	3.6 (0.14)	0.9 (0.04)	0.1 (0.00)	2.0 (0.08)	6.8 (0.27)	18.7 (0.74)	34.1 (1.34)	43.2 (1.70)	225.7 (8.89)
Average rainy days (≥ 1.0 mm)	8.0	7.2	6.9	5.5	2.9	0.9	0.2	0.8	2.7	6.1	8.8	9.4	59.4
Mean monthly sunshine hours	178	186	221	237	282	306	337	319	253	222	178	168	2,887
Source: Agencia Estatal de Meteorología

Climate data for Gran Canaria Airport 24m (1981–2010 normals)
Month	Jan	Feb	Mar	Apr	May	Jun	Jul	Aug	Sep	Oct	Nov	Dec	Year
Mean daily maximum °C (°F)	20.8 (69.4)	21.2 (70.2)	22.3 (72.1)	22.6 (72.7)	23.6 (74.5)	25.3 (77.5)	26.9 (80.4)	27.5 (81.5)	27.2 (81.0)	26.2 (79.2)	24.2 (75.6)	22.2 (72.0)	24.2 (75.6)
Daily mean °C (°F)	18.1 (64.6)	18.4 (65.1)	19.3 (66.7)	19.5 (67.1)	20.5 (68.9)	22.2 (72.0)	23.8 (74.8)	24.6 (76.3)	24.3 (75.7)	23.1 (73.6)	21.2 (70.2)	19.3 (66.7)	21.2 (70.2)
Mean daily minimum °C (°F)	15.3 (59.5)	15.6 (60.1)	16.2 (61.2)	16.3 (61.3)	17.3 (63.1)	19.2 (66.6)	20.8 (69.4)	21.6 (70.9)	21.4 (70.5)	20.1 (68.2)	18.1 (64.6)	16.5 (61.7)	18.2 (64.8)
Average precipitation mm (inches)	25 (1.0)	24 (0.9)	13 (0.5)	6 (0.2)	1 (0.0)	0 (0)	0 (0)	0 (0)	9 (0.4)	16 (0.6)	22 (0.9)	31 (1.2)	151 (5.9)
Average precipitation days (≥ 1 mm)	3	3	2	1	0	0	0	0	1	2	4	5	22
Mean monthly sunshine hours	184	191	229	228	272	284	308	300	241	220	185	179	2,821
Source: World Meteorological Organization (UN), Agencia Estatal de Meteorología

Climate data for San Cristóbal de La Laguna (1981–2010) 632 m – Tenerife North Airport
Month	Jan	Feb	Mar	Apr	May	Jun	Jul	Aug	Sep	Oct	Nov	Dec	Year
Mean daily maximum °C (°F)	16.0 (60.8)	16.7 (62.1)	18.2 (64.8)	18.5 (65.3)	20.1 (68.2)	22.2 (72.0)	24.7 (76.5)	25.7 (78.3)	24.9 (76.8)	22.5 (72.5)	19.7 (67.5)	17.1 (62.8)	20.5 (68.9)
Daily mean °C (°F)	13.1 (55.6)	13.4 (56.1)	14.5 (58.1)	14.7 (58.5)	16.1 (61.0)	18.1 (64.6)	20.2 (68.4)	21.2 (70.2)	20.7 (69.3)	18.9 (66.0)	16.5 (61.7)	14.3 (57.7)	16.8 (62.2)
Mean daily minimum °C (°F)	10.2 (50.4)	10.0 (50.0)	10.7 (51.3)	10.9 (51.6)	12.0 (53.6)	14.0 (57.2)	15.7 (60.3)	16.6 (61.9)	16.5 (61.7)	15.2 (59.4)	13.3 (55.9)	11.5 (52.7)	13.0 (55.4)
Average rainfall mm (inches)	80 (3.1)	70 (2.8)	61 (2.4)	39 (1.5)	19 (0.7)	11 (0.4)	6 (0.2)	5 (0.2)	16 (0.6)	47 (1.9)	81 (3.2)	82 (3.2)	517 (20.2)
Average rainy days (≥ 1.0 mm)	11	10	10	10	7	4	3	3	5	10	10	12	95
Mean monthly sunshine hours	150	168	188	203	234	237	262	269	213	194	155	137	2,410
Source: Agencia Estatal de Meteorología

Climate data for Tenerife South Airport 64m (1981–2010 normals)
Month	Jan	Feb	Mar	Apr	May	Jun	Jul	Aug	Sep	Oct	Nov	Dec	Year
Mean daily maximum °C (°F)	21.7 (71.1)	22.0 (71.6)	23.1 (73.6)	23.1 (73.6)	23.9 (75.0)	25.4 (77.7)	27.7 (81.9)	28.4 (83.1)	27.9 (82.2)	26.8 (80.2)	24.8 (76.6)	22.8 (73.0)	24.8 (76.6)
Daily mean °C (°F)	18.4 (65.1)	18.5 (65.3)	19.3 (66.7)	19.5 (67.1)	20.4 (68.7)	22.1 (71.8)	24.0 (75.2)	24.7 (76.5)	24.5 (76.1)	23.4 (74.1)	21.5 (70.7)	19.7 (67.5)	21.4 (70.5)
Mean daily minimum °C (°F)	15.2 (59.4)	15.0 (59.0)	15.6 (60.1)	16.0 (60.8)	17.0 (62.6)	18.8 (65.8)	20.2 (68.4)	21.1 (70.0)	21.1 (70.0)	20.0 (68.0)	18.2 (64.8)	16.5 (61.7)	17.9 (64.2)
Average rainfall mm (inches)	16.6 (0.65)	19.9 (0.78)	14.7 (0.58)	7.4 (0.29)	1.1 (0.04)	0.1 (0.00)	0.1 (0.00)	1.3 (0.05)	3.6 (0.14)	11.9 (0.47)	26.3 (1.04)	30.3 (1.19)	133.3 (5.23)
Average rainy days (≥ 1.0 mm)	1.8	2.2	1.9	1.1	0.3	0.0	0.0	0.2	0.6	1.6	1.9	3.5	15.1
Mean monthly sunshine hours	193	195	226	219	246	259	295	277	213	214	193	195	2,725
Source: Agencia Estatal de Meteorología

Climate data for La Palma Airport 33m (1981–2010 normals)
Month	Jan	Feb	Mar	Apr	May	Jun	Jul	Aug	Sep	Oct	Nov	Dec	Year
Mean daily maximum °C (°F)	20.6 (69.1)	20.7 (69.3)	21.2 (70.2)	21.6 (70.9)	22.6 (72.7)	24.1 (75.4)	25.5 (77.9)	26.3 (79.3)	26.6 (79.9)	25.5 (77.9)	23.5 (74.3)	21.8 (71.2)	23.3 (74.0)
Daily mean °C (°F)	18.1 (64.6)	18.0 (64.4)	18.5 (65.3)	18.9 (66.0)	20.0 (68.0)	21.7 (71.1)	23.1 (73.6)	23.9 (75.0)	24.0 (75.2)	22.8 (73.0)	20.9 (69.6)	19.3 (66.7)	20.8 (69.4)
Mean daily minimum °C (°F)	15.5 (59.9)	15.3 (59.5)	15.7 (60.3)	16.2 (61.2)	17.4 (63.3)	19.2 (66.6)	20.7 (69.3)	21.4 (70.5)	21.3 (70.3)	20.2 (68.4)	18.3 (64.9)	16.7 (62.1)	18.2 (64.7)
Average rainfall mm (inches)	49 (1.9)	57 (2.2)	33 (1.3)	19 (0.7)	7 (0.3)	2 (0.1)	1 (0.0)	1 (0.0)	12 (0.5)	41 (1.6)	70 (2.8)	80 (3.1)	372 (14.5)
Average rainy days	5	4	4	3	1	0	0	0	2	5	7	8	40
Mean monthly sunshine hours	141	146	177	174	192	188	222	209	187	175	140	138	2,106
Source: Agencia Estatal de Meteorología

=== Geology ===
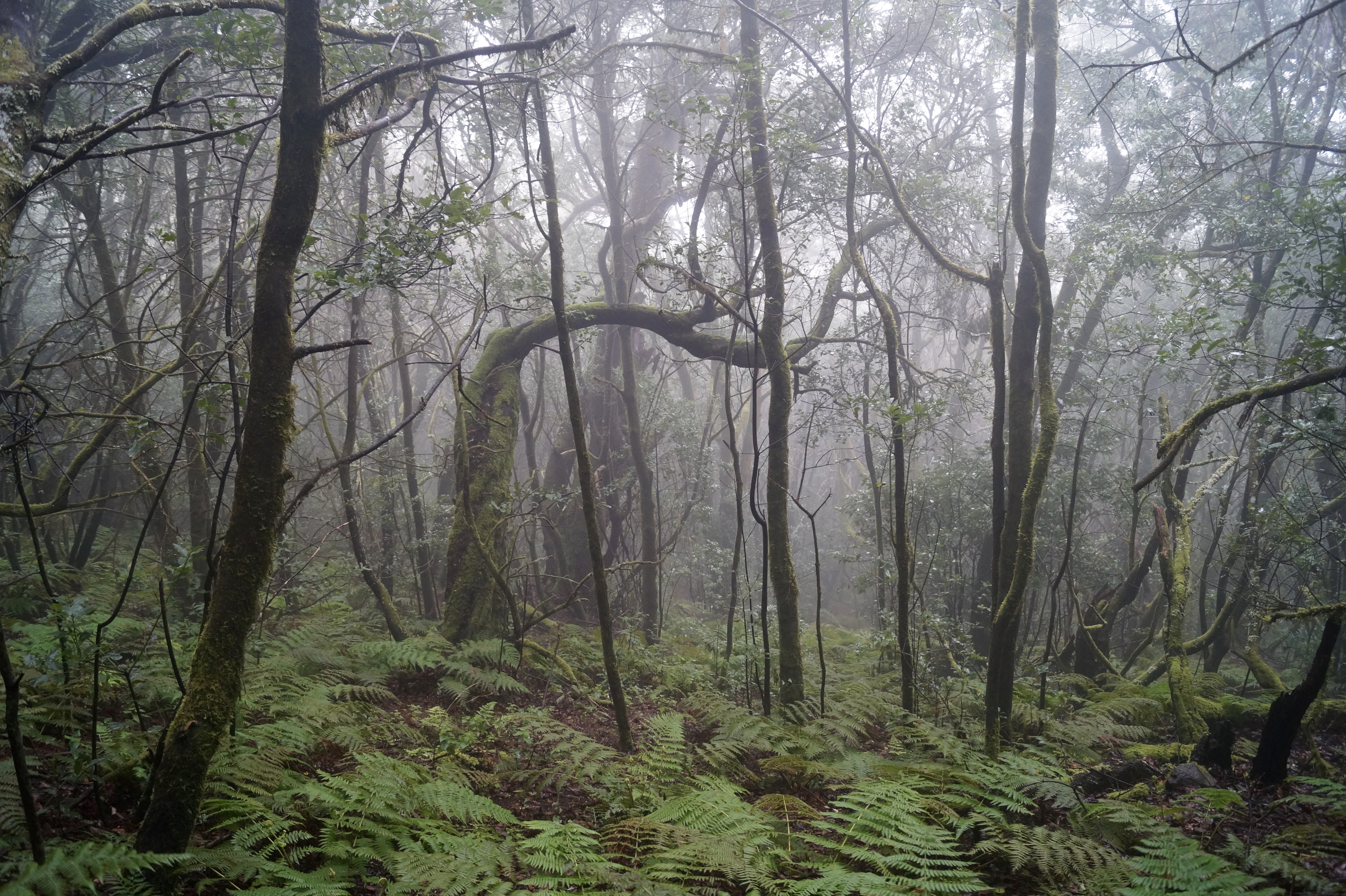
A humid laurel forest in La Gomera

The seven major islands, one minor island, and several small islets were originally volcanic islands, formed by the Canary hotspot. The Canary Islands is the only place in Spain where volcanic eruptions have been recorded during the Modern Era, with some volcanoes still active (El Hierro, 2011). Volcanic islands such as those in the Canary chain often have steep ocean cliffs caused by catastrophic debris avalanches and landslides. The island chain's most recent eruption occurred at Cumbre Vieja, a volcanic ridge on La Palma, in 2021.

The Teide volcano on Tenerife is the highest mountain in Spain, and the third tallest volcano on Earth on a volcanic ocean island. All the islands except La Gomera have been active in the last million years. Four of them, Lanzarote, Tenerife, La Palma and El Hierro, have historical records of eruptions since European discovery. The islands rise from Jurassic oceanic crust associated with the opening of the Atlantic. Underwater magmatism began during the Cretaceous, and has continued to the present day. The islands were once considered as a distinct physiographic section of the Atlas Mountains province, which is part of the larger African Alpine System division, but are now recognised as being related to a magmatic hot spot.

In the summer of 2011, a series of low-magnitude earthquakes occurred beneath El Hierro. These had a linear trend of northeast–southwest. In October a submarine eruption occurred about 2 km (1 1/4 mi) south of Restinga. This eruption produced gases and pumice, but no explosive activity was reported.

The following table shows the highest mountains in each of the islands:

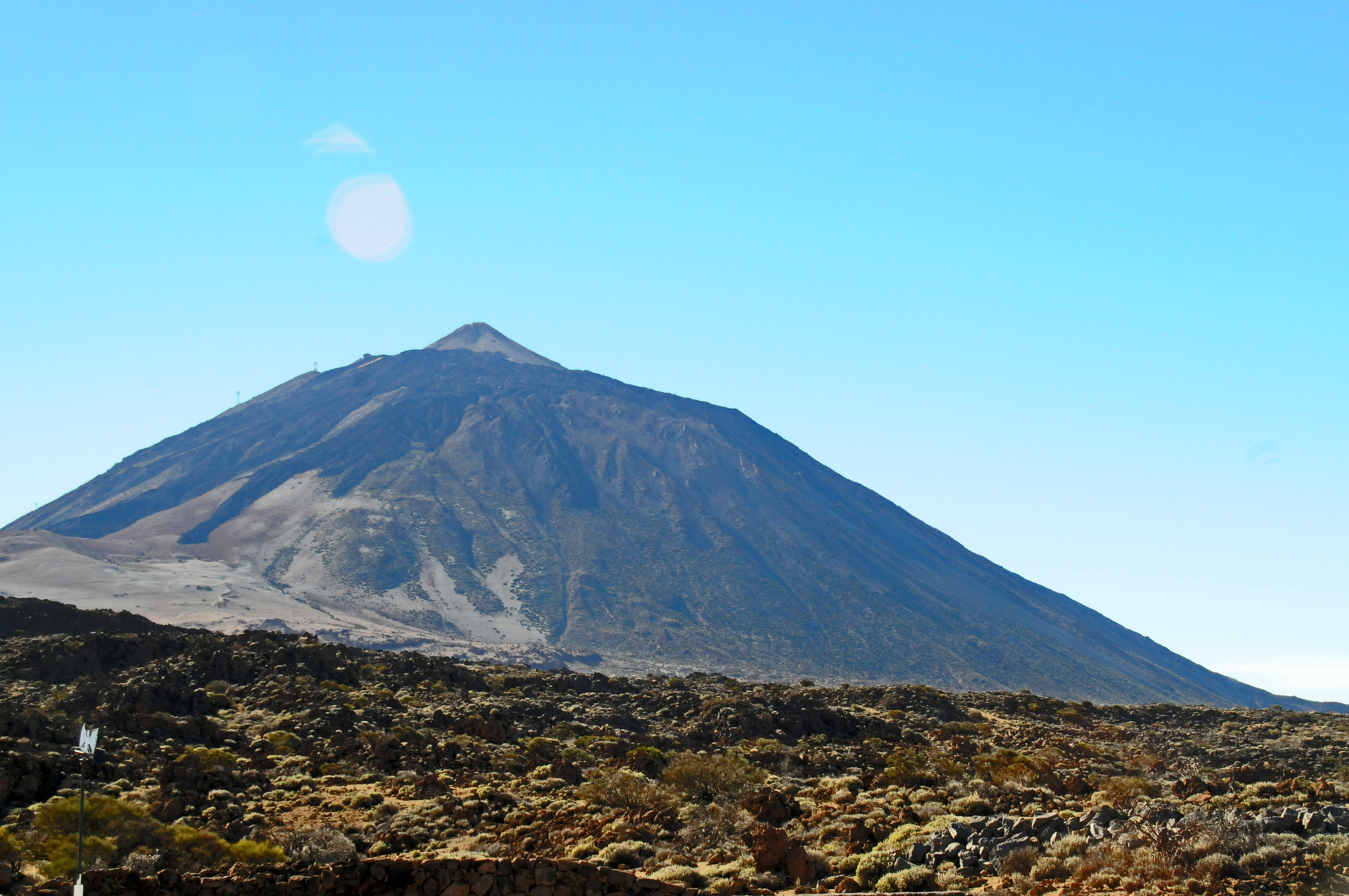
Mount Teide, the highest mountain in Spain at 3,715 metres (12,188 feet), is the most visited National Park in Spain.

Mountain	Elevation		Island
Mountain	m	ft	Island
Teide	3,715	12,188	Tenerife
Roque de los Muchachos	2,426	7,959	La Palma
Pico de las Nieves	1,949	6,394	Gran Canaria
Pico de Malpaso	1,501	4,925	El Hierro
Garajonay	1,487	4,879	La Gomera
Pico de la Zarza	812	2,664	Fuerteventura
Peñas del Chache	670	2,200	Lanzarote
Aguja Grande	266	873	La Graciosa
Caldera de Alegranza	289	948	Alegranza
Caldera de Lobos	126	413	Lobos
La Mariana	256	840	Montaña Clara

=== Islands ===
From west to east, the Canary Islands are El Hierro, La Palma, La Gomera, Tenerife, Gran Canaria, Fuerteventura, Lanzarote, and La Graciosa. North of Lanzarote are the islets of Montaña Clara, Alegranza, Roque del Este and Roque del Oeste, belonging to the Chinijo Archipelago. Northeast of Fuerteventura is the islet of Lobos. There are a series of small adjacent rocks in the Canary Islands: the Roques de Anaga, Garachico and Fasnia in Tenerife, and Salmor and Bonanza in El Hierro.

The Canary Islands

El Hierro

La Palma

La Gomera

Tenerife

Gran Canaria

Fuerteventura

Lanzarote

==== El Hierro ====
El Hierro, the westernmost island, covers 268.71 km^{2} (103.75 sq mi). It is the second smallest of the major islands, and the least populous with 10,798 inhabitants. The whole island was declared a Reserve of the Biosphere in 2000. Its capital is Valverde. Also known as Ferro, it was once the westernmost known land in the world. Ancient European geographers such as Ptolemy recognised the island as the prime meridian of longitude with the Ferro meridian. That remained so until the 19th century, when it was displaced by the one passing through Greenwich.

==== Fuerteventura ====
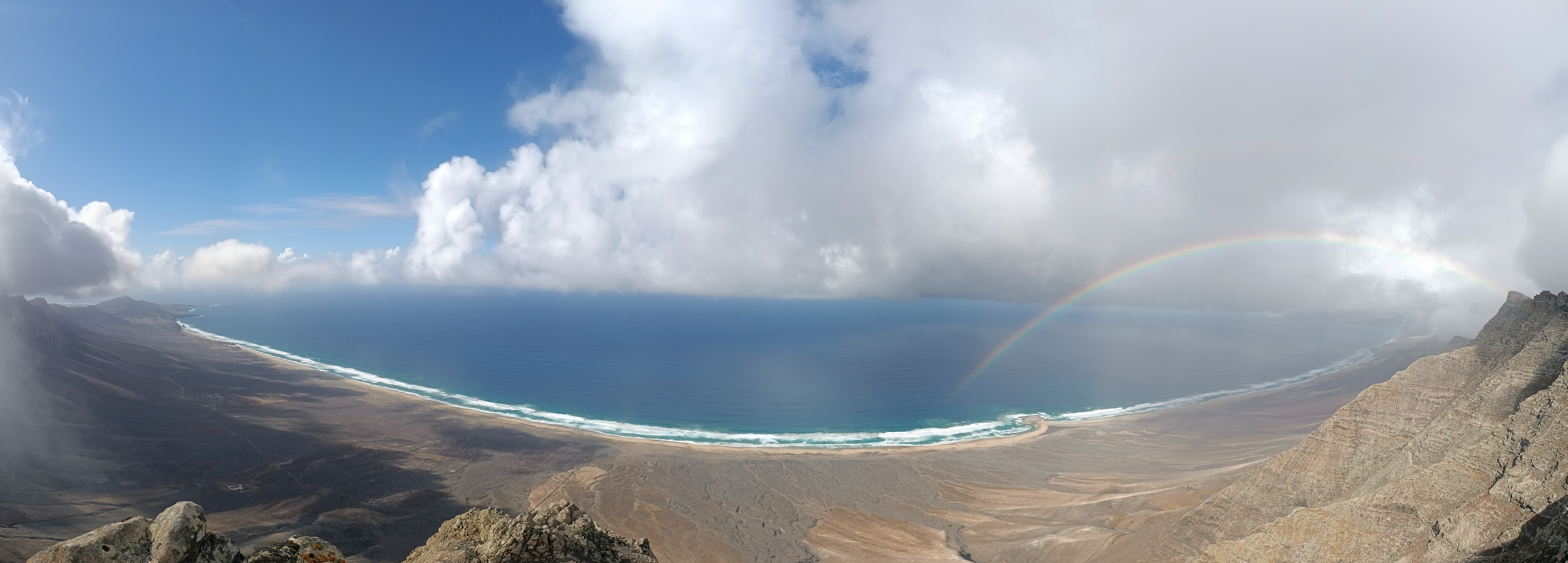
View from Pico de la Palma, Fuerteventura

Fuerteventura, with a surface of 1,660 km^{2} (640 sq mi), is the second largest island of the archipelago. It has been declared a biosphere reserve by UNESCO. It is the oldest of the islands being more eroded. Its highest point is the Pico de la Zarza, at a height of 807 metres (2,648 feet). Its capital is Puerto del Rosario.

==== Gran Canaria ====
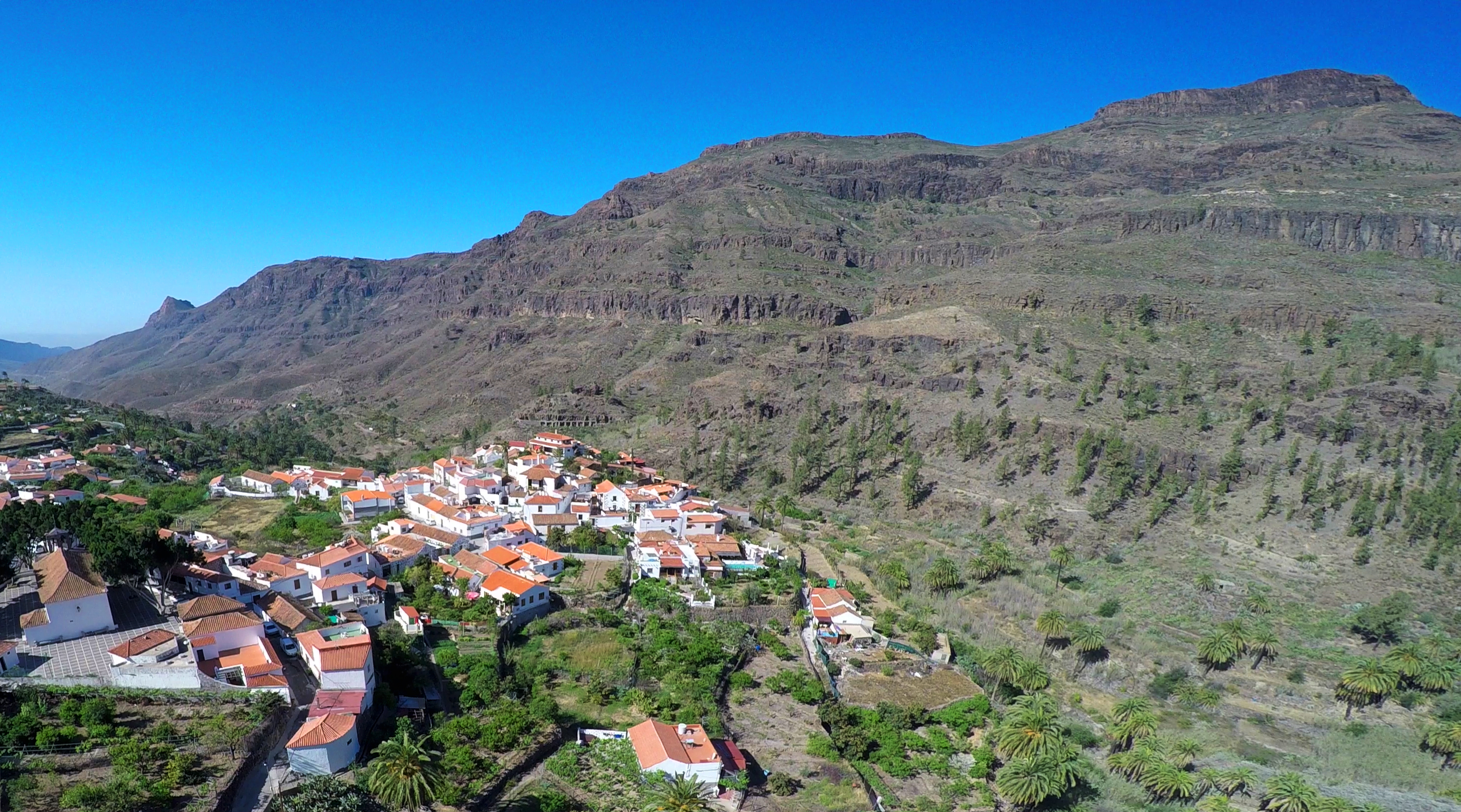
View of Fataga, Gran Canaria

Gran Canaria has 846,717 inhabitants. The capital, Las Palmas de Gran Canaria, with 377,203 inhabitants, is the most populous city and shares the status of capital of the Canaries with Santa Cruz de Tenerife. Gran Canaria's surface area is 1,560 km^{2} (600 sq mi). Roque Nublo 1,813 metres (5,948 feet) and Pico de las Nieves ("Peak of Snow") 1,949 metres (6,394 feet) are located in the center of the island. On the south of the island are the Maspalomas Dunes (Gran Canaria).

==== La Gomera ====
La Gomera (informally known as 'Isla Colombina') has an area of 369.76 km^{2} (142.77 sq mi) and is the second least populous island with 21,136 inhabitants. It has been declared a biosphere reserve by UNESCO. Geologically it is one of the oldest of the archipelago. The insular capital is San Sebastián de La Gomera. Garajonay National Park is located on the island.

==== Lanzarote ====
Lanzarote is the easternmost island and one of the oldest of the archipelago, and it has shown evidence of recent volcanic activity. It has a surface of 845.94 km^{2} (326.62 sq mi), and a population of 149,183 inhabitants, including the adjacent islets of the Chinijo Archipelago. The capital is Arrecife, with 56,834 inhabitants.

==== Chinijo Archipelago ====
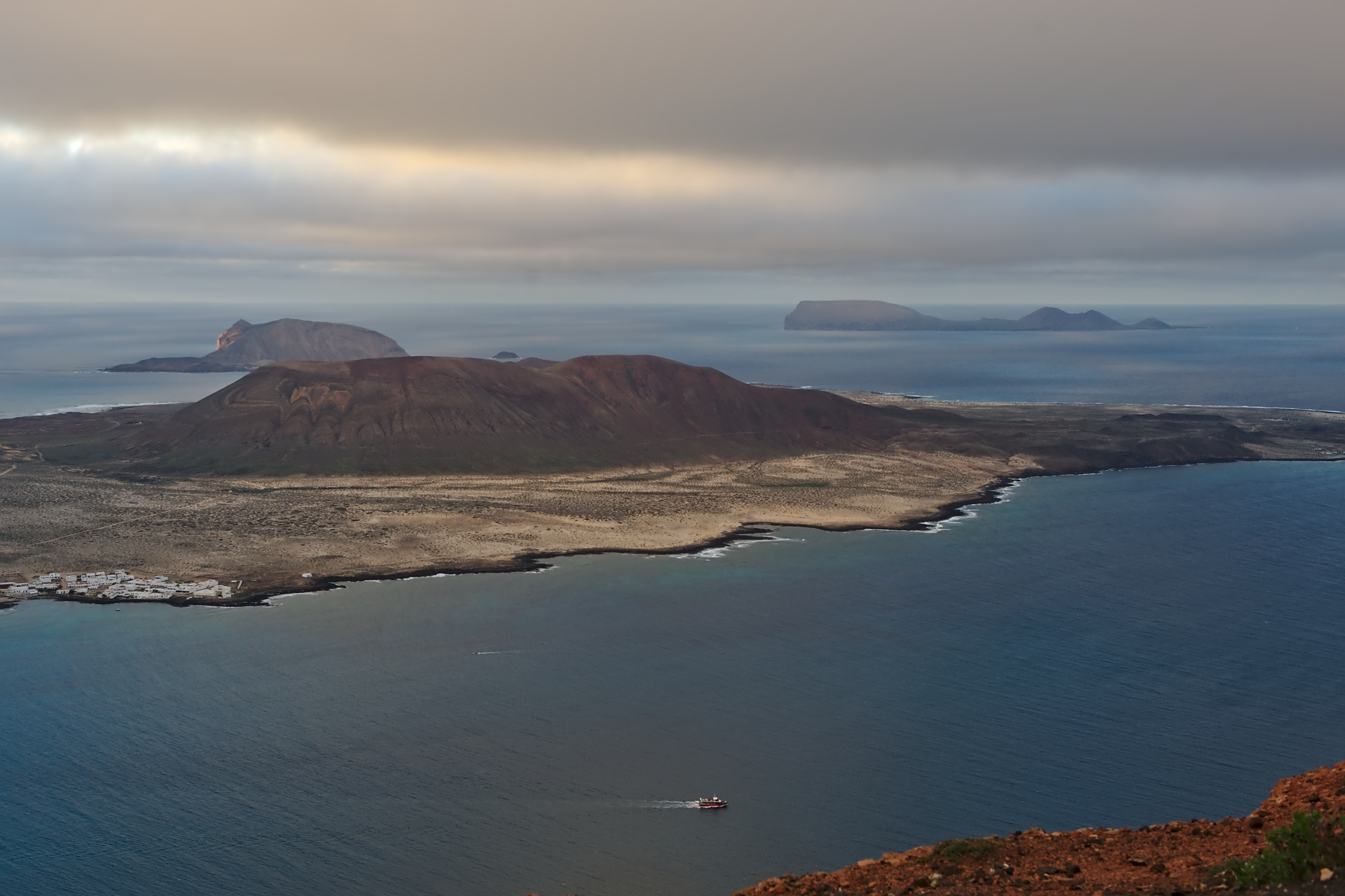
The Chinijo Archipelago, seen from Lanzarote

The Chinijo Archipelago includes the islands La Graciosa, Alegranza, Montaña Clara, Roque del Este and Roque del Oeste. It has a surface of 40.8 km^{2} (15.8 sq mi), and only La Graciosa is populated, with 658 inhabitants. With 29 km^{2} (11 sq mi), La Graciosa is the largest island of the Chinijo Archipelago and the smallest inhabited island of the Canaries.

===== La Graciosa =====
Graciosa Island or commonly La Graciosa is a volcanic island in the Canary Islands of Spain, located 2 km (1.2 mi) north of the island of Lanzarote across the Strait of El Río. It was formed by the Canary hotspot. The island is part of the Chinijo Archipelago and the Chinijo Archipelago Natural Park (Parque Natural del Archipiélago Chinijo). It is administered by the municipality of Teguise. In 2018, La Graciosa was declared as the eighth Canary Island by the Spanish Senate, though it is not recognised as such by the Canarian administration. It is administratively dependent on the island of Lanzarote. It is the smallest and least populated of the main islands, with about 700 people.

==== La Palma ====
La Palma, with 81,863 inhabitants covering an area of 708.32 km^{2} (273.48 sq mi), is in its entirety a biosphere reserve. For long it showed no signs of volcanic activity, even though the volcano Teneguía entered into eruption last in 1971. On 19 September 2021, the volcanic Cumbre Vieja on the island erupted. It is the second-highest island of the Canaries, with the Roque de los Muchachos at 2,423 metres (7,949 feet) as its highest point. Santa Cruz de La Palma, known to those on the island as simply "Santa Cruz", is its capital.

Built by volcanic eruptions over roughly two million years, the volcanic structure continues several thousand metres below the ocean surface down to the ocean floor.

==== Tenerife ====
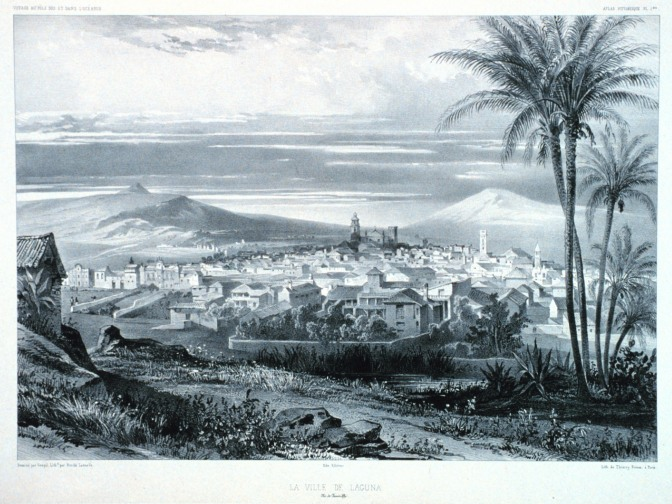
San Cristóbal de La Laguna in 1880 (Tenerife)

Tenerife is, with its area of 2,034 km^{2} (785 sq mi), the most extensive island of the Canary Islands. With 904,713 inhabitants, it is the most populated island of the archipelago and Spain. Two of the islands' principal cities are located on it: the capital, Santa Cruz de Tenerife and San Cristóbal de La Laguna, a World Heritage Site. San Cristóbal de La Laguna, the second city of the island, is home to the oldest university in the Canary Islands, the University of La Laguna. Teide, with its 3,715 metres (12,188 feet) is the highest peak of Spain and a World Heritage Site. Tenerife is the site of the worst air disaster in the history of aviation, in which 583 people were killed in the collision of two Boeing 747s on 27 March 1977.

==== List of islands ====
Flag	Coat of arms	Island	Capital	Population (2025)	Area (km^{2})	Population density (people/km^{2})
		El Hierro	Valverde	11,993	268.71	44.6
		Fuerteventura	Puerto del Rosario	129,080	1,660	77.8
		Gran Canaria	Las Palmas de Gran Canaria	875,589	1,560.1	561.2
		La Gomera	San Sebastián	22,560	369.76	61.0
		Lanzarote	Arrecife	166,878	845.94	197.3
		La Palma	Santa Cruz de La Palma	86,297	708.32	121.8
		Tenerife	Santa Cruz de Tenerife	966,469	2,034.38	475.1
–	–	La Graciosa	Caleta de Sebo	-	29.05	-
–	–	Alegranza	–	–	10.3	–
–	–	Isla de Lobos	–	–	4.5	–
–	–	Montaña Clara	–	–	1.48	–
–	–	Roque del Este	–	–	0.06	–
–	–	Roque del Oeste	–	–	0.015	–

=== Natural symbols ===
The official natural symbols associated with Canary Islands are the bird Serinus canaria (canary) and the Phoenix canariensis palm.

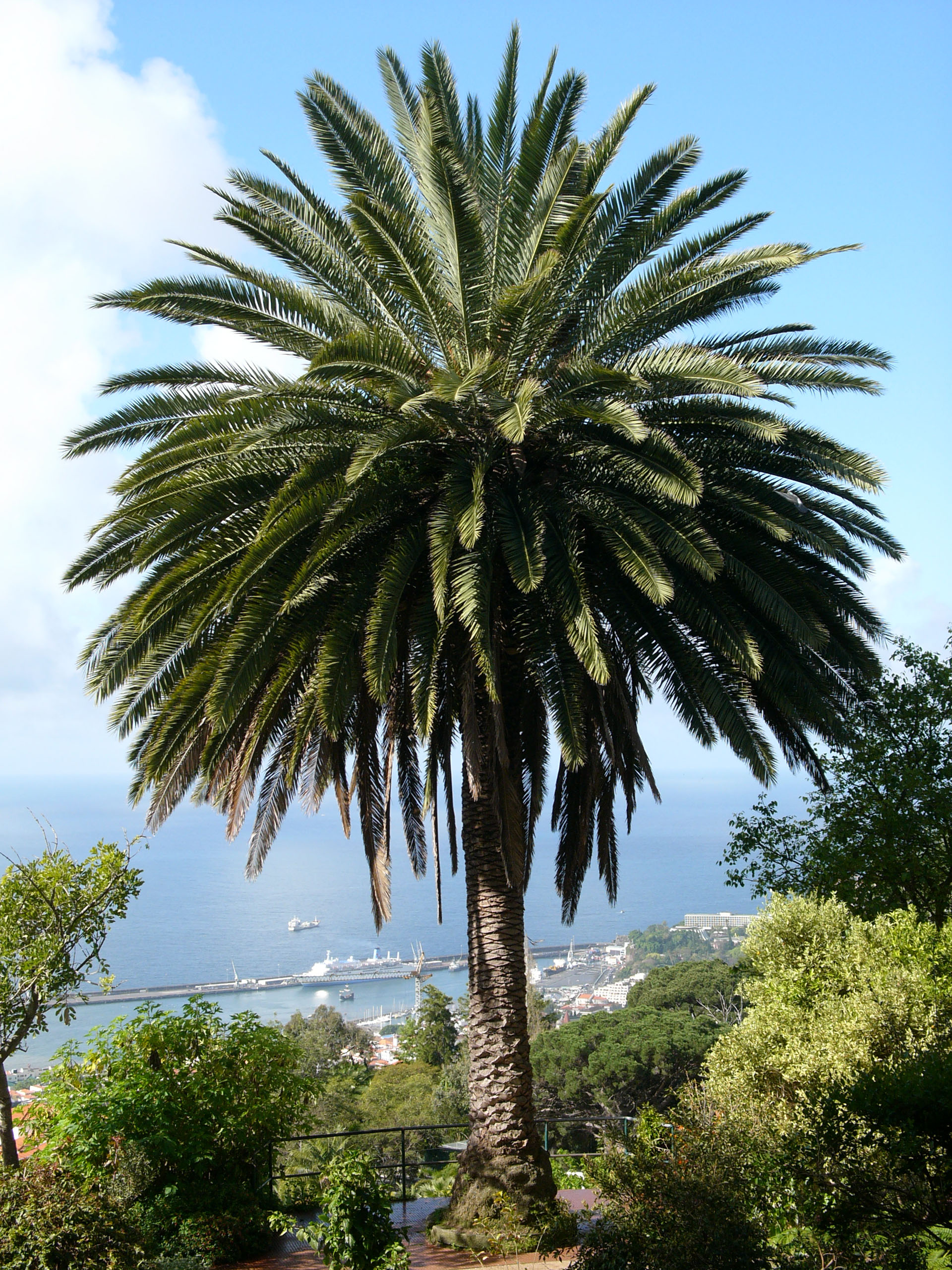
Canary Island date palm, Phoenix canariensis

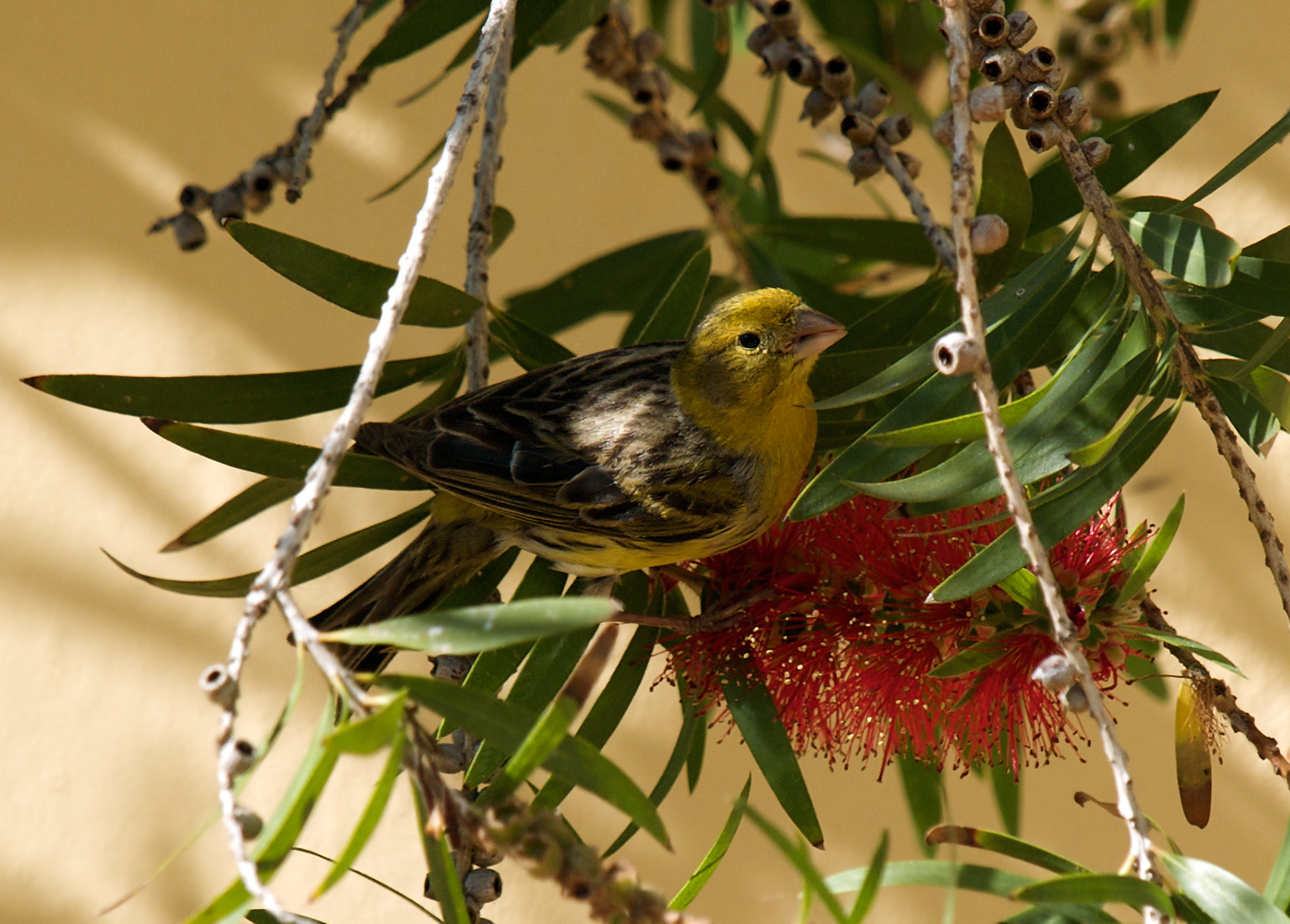
Atlantic canary, Serinus canaria

=== National parks ===
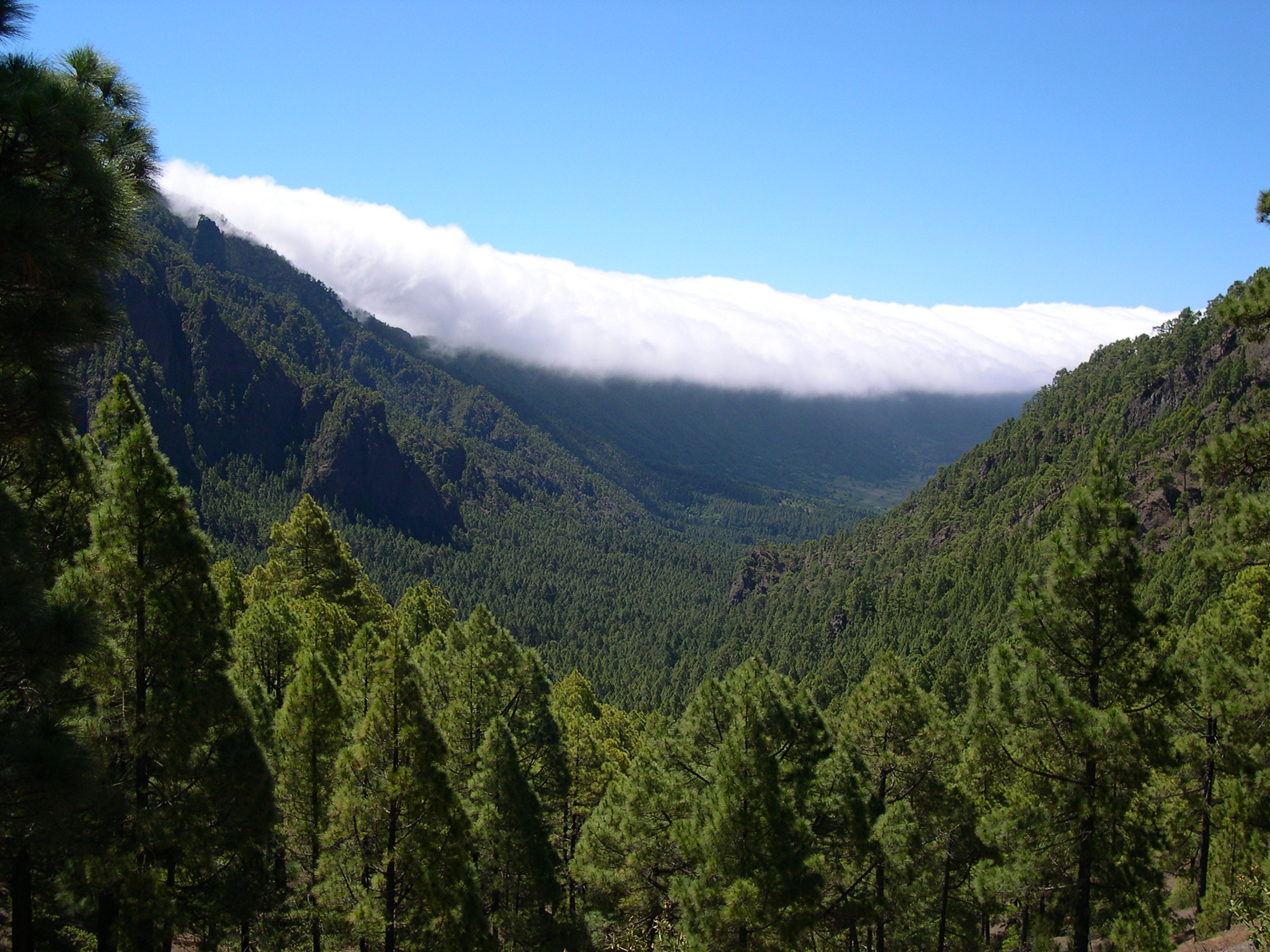
The Caldera de Taburiente National Park (La Palma)

Four of Spain's thirteen national parks are located in the Canary Islands, more than any other autonomous community. Two of these have been declared UNESCO World Heritage Sites and the other two are part of Biosphere Reserves. The parks are:

Park	Island	Area	Year of designation	UNESCO Status
Caldera de Taburiente National Park	La Palma	46.9 km^{2} (18.1 sq mi)	1954	Part of the La Palma Biosphere Reserve since 2002
Garajonay National Park	La Gomera	39.86 km^{2} (15.39 sq mi)	1981	World Heritage Site since 1986
Teide National Park	Tenerife	189.9 km^{2} (73.3 sq mi)	1954	World Heritage Site since 2007
Timanfaya National Park	Lanzarote	51.07 km^{2} (19.72 sq mi)	1974	Part of the Lanzarote Biosphere Reserve since 1993

Teide National Park is the oldest and largest national park in the Canary Islands and one of the oldest in Spain. Located in the geographic centre of the island of Tenerife, it is the most visited national park in Spain. The park's highlight is the Teide volcano. Standing at an altitude of 3,715 metres (12,188 ft), it is the highest elevation in Spain and the third largest volcano on Earth from its base. In 2007, the Teide National Park was declared one of the 12 Treasures of Spain.

=== Wildlife ===
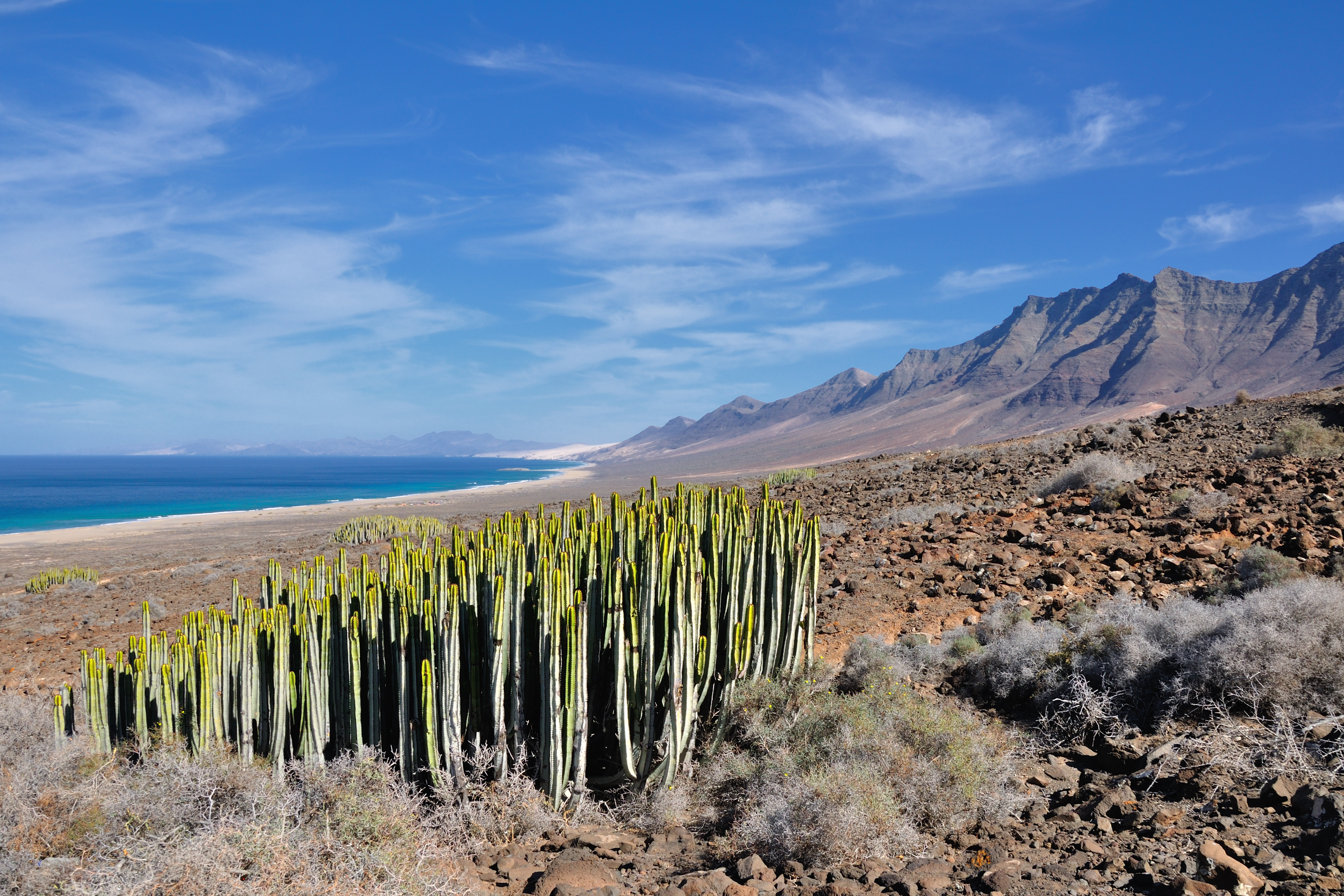
Canary Island spurge in Fuerteventura

==== Fauna ====
The bird life includes European and African species, such as the black-bellied sandgrouse, canary, graja – a subspecies of red-billed chough endemic to La Palma, Gran Canaria blue chaffinch, Tenerife blue chaffinch, Canary Islands chaffinch, Canary Islands chiffchaff, Fuerteventura chat, Tenerife goldcrest, Canarian Egyptian vulture, Bolle's pigeon, laurel pigeon, plain swift, and houbara bustard.

Terrestrial fauna includes the El Hierro giant lizard, Tachina canariensis, La Gomera giant lizard, and the (possibly extinct) La Palma giant lizard. Mammals include the Canarian shrew, Canary big-eared bat, the Algerian hedgehog, and the more recently introduced mouflon.

===== Extinct fauna =====
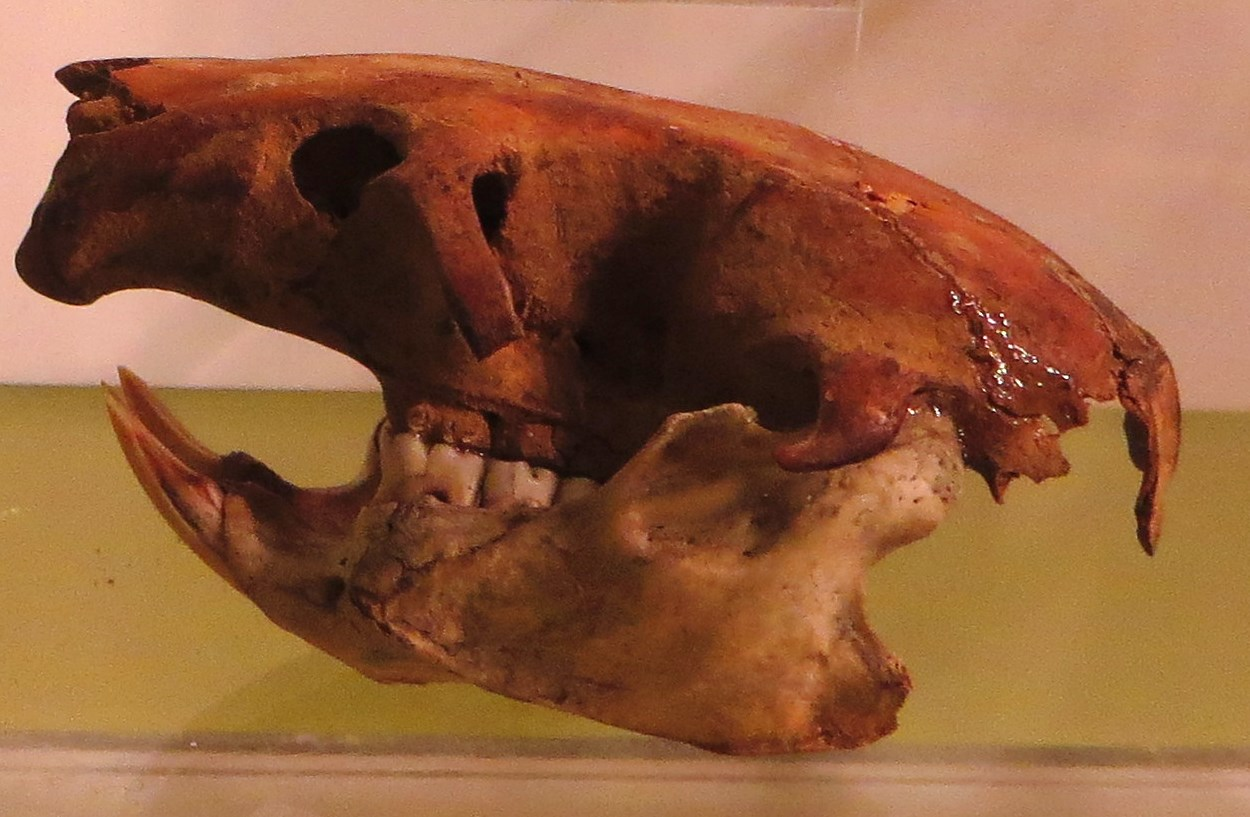
Skull of Tenerife giant rat (Canariomys bravoi), an endemic species that is now extinct

The Canary Islands were previously inhabited by a variety of endemic animals, such as extinct giant lizards (Gallotia goliath), giant tortoises (Centrochelys burchardi and C. vulcanica), Tenerife and Gran Canaria giant rats (Canariomys bravoi and C. tamarani), and the lava mouse Malpaisomys insularis. The Canary Islands oystercatcher went extinct in the 20th century, and extinct birds known only from Pleistocene and Holocene age bones include the Canary Islands quail (Coturnix gomerae), dune shearwater (Puffinus holeae), lava shearwater (P. olsoni), Trias greenfinch (Chloris triasi), slender-billed greenfinch (C. aurelioi) and the long-legged bunting (Emberiza alcoveri).

==== Marine life ====
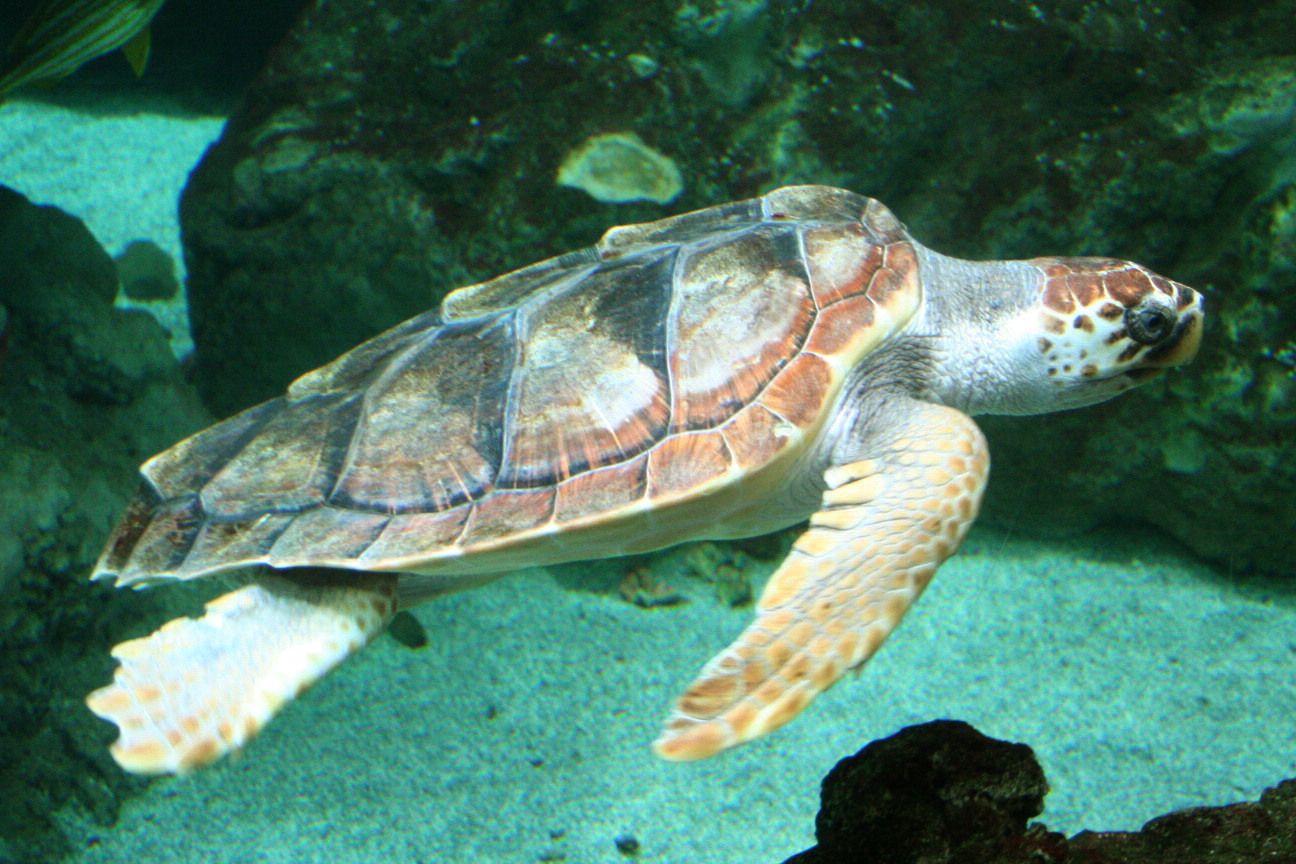
A loggerhead sea turtle, by far the most common species of marine turtle in the Canary Islands

The marine life found in the Canary Islands is also varied, being a combination of North Atlantic, Mediterranean and endemic species. In recent years, the increasing popularity of both scuba diving and underwater photography have provided biologists with much new information on the marine life of the islands.

Fish found in the islands include many species of shark, ray, moray eel, bream, jack, grunt, scorpionfish, triggerfish, grouper, goby, and blenny. In addition, there is a variety of invertebrates, including numerous species of sponge, jellyfish, anemone, crab, mollusc, sea urchin, starfish, sea cucumber and coral.

There are five species of marine turtle that are sighted periodically in the islands, the most common of these being the endangered loggerhead sea turtle. The other four are the green, hawksbill, leatherback and Kemp's ridley sea turtles. Currently, there are no signs that any of these species breed in the islands, and so those seen in the water are usually migrating. However, it is believed that some of these species may have bred in the islands in the past, and there are records of several sightings of leatherback sea turtle on beaches in Fuerteventura, adding credibility to the theory.

Marine mammals include a large variety of cetaceans. Hooded seals have also been known to be biologically vagrant. The Canary Islands were also formerly home to a population of the rarest pinniped in the world, the Mediterranean monk seal.

==== Native flora gallery ====
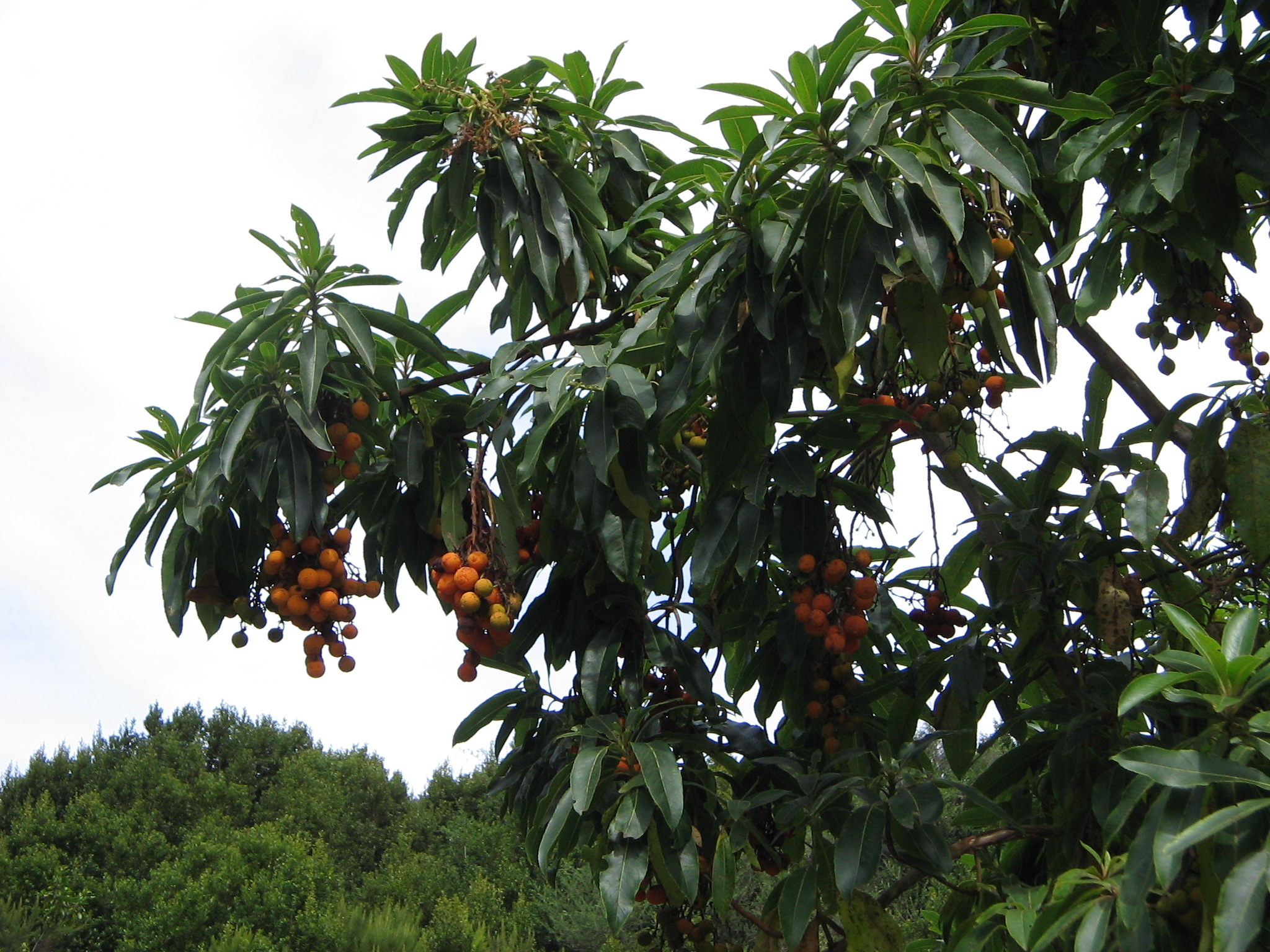
Arbutus canariensis

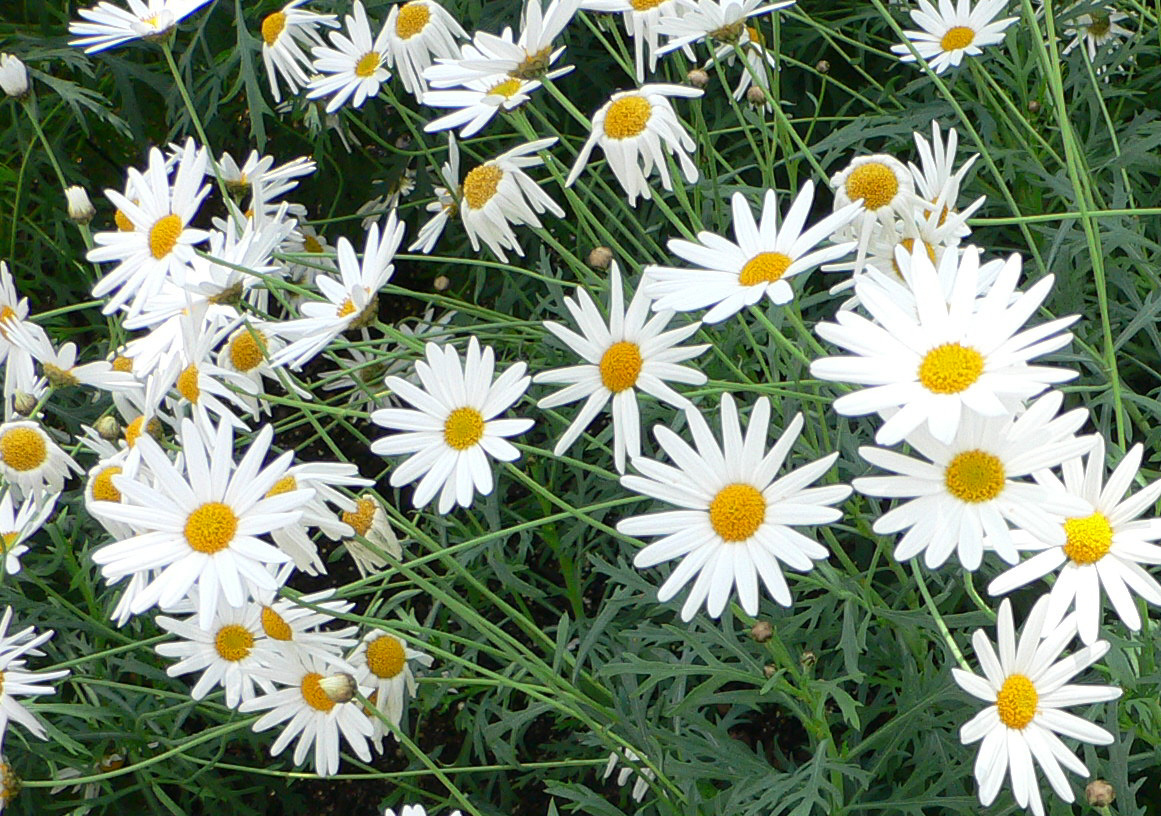
Argyranthemum frutescens

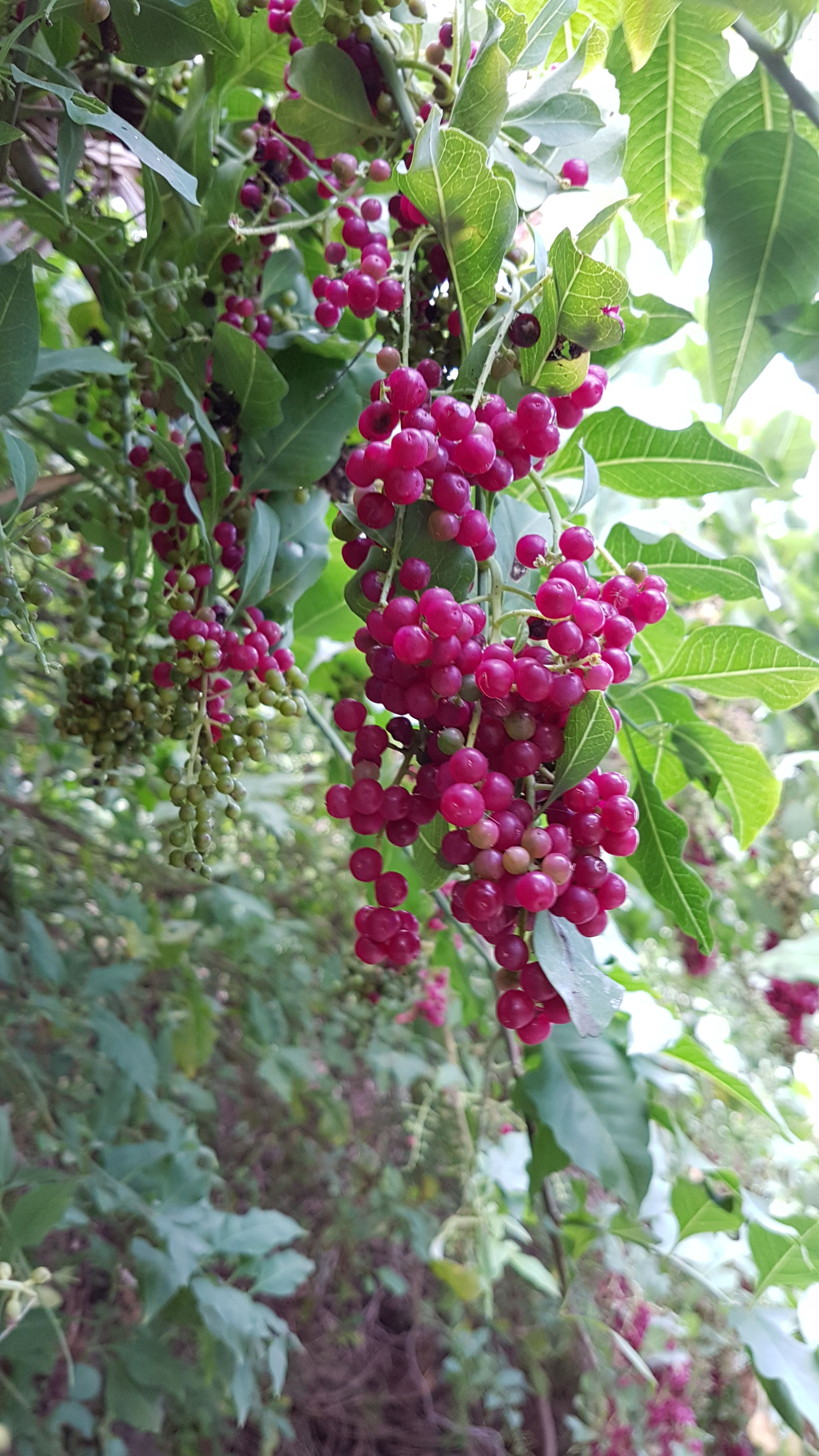
Bosea yervamora

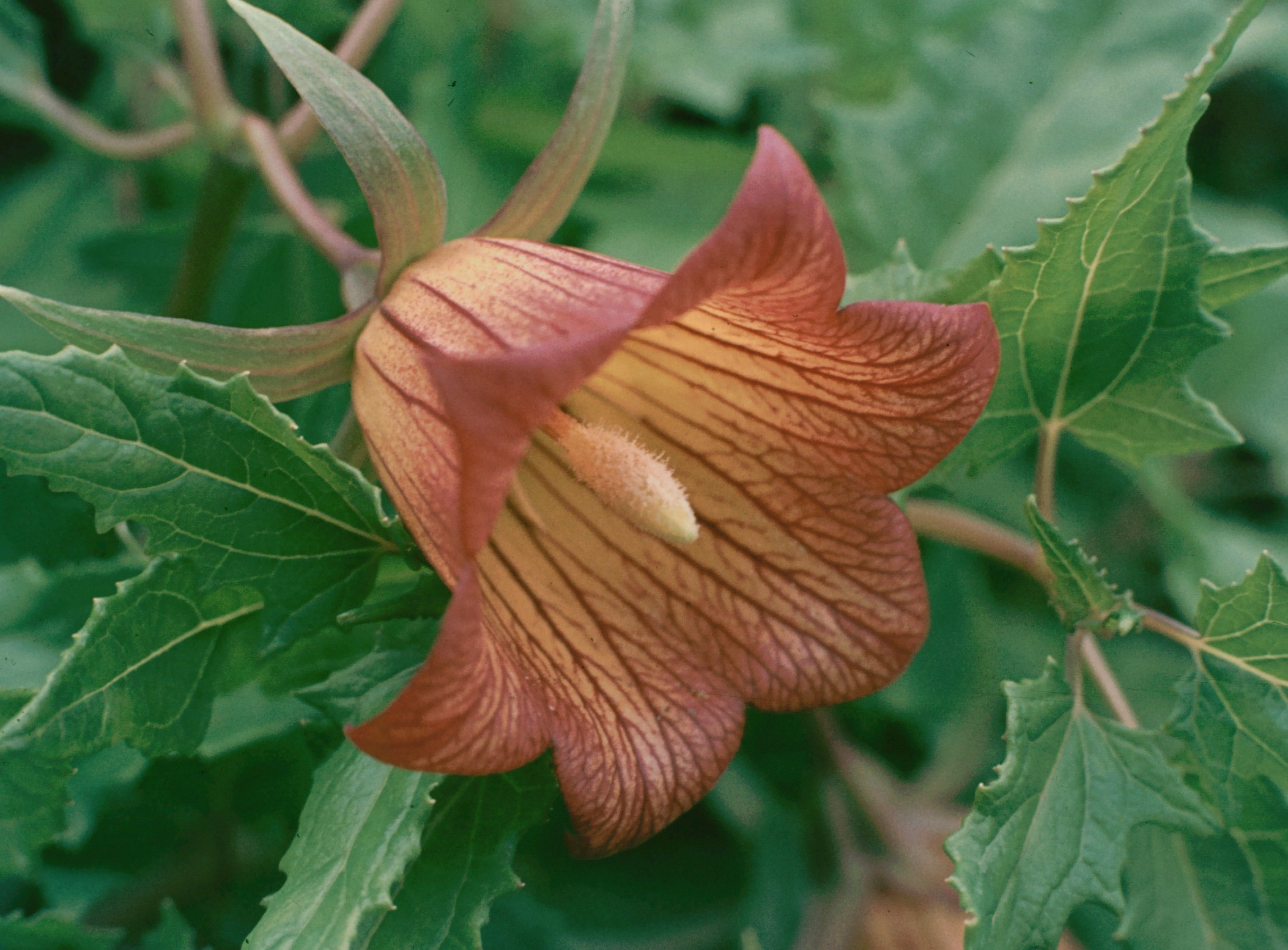
Canarina canariensis

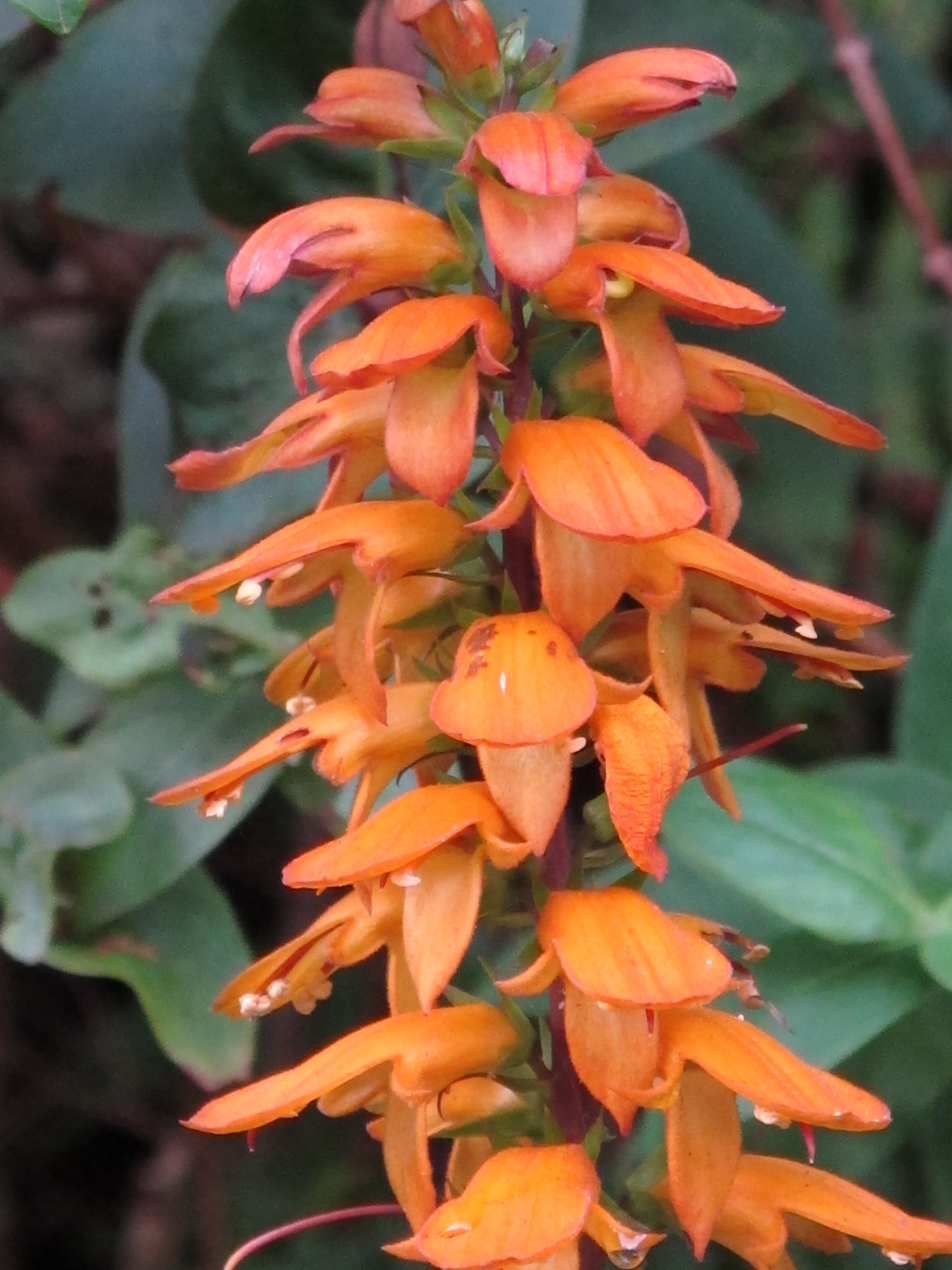
Digitalis canariensis

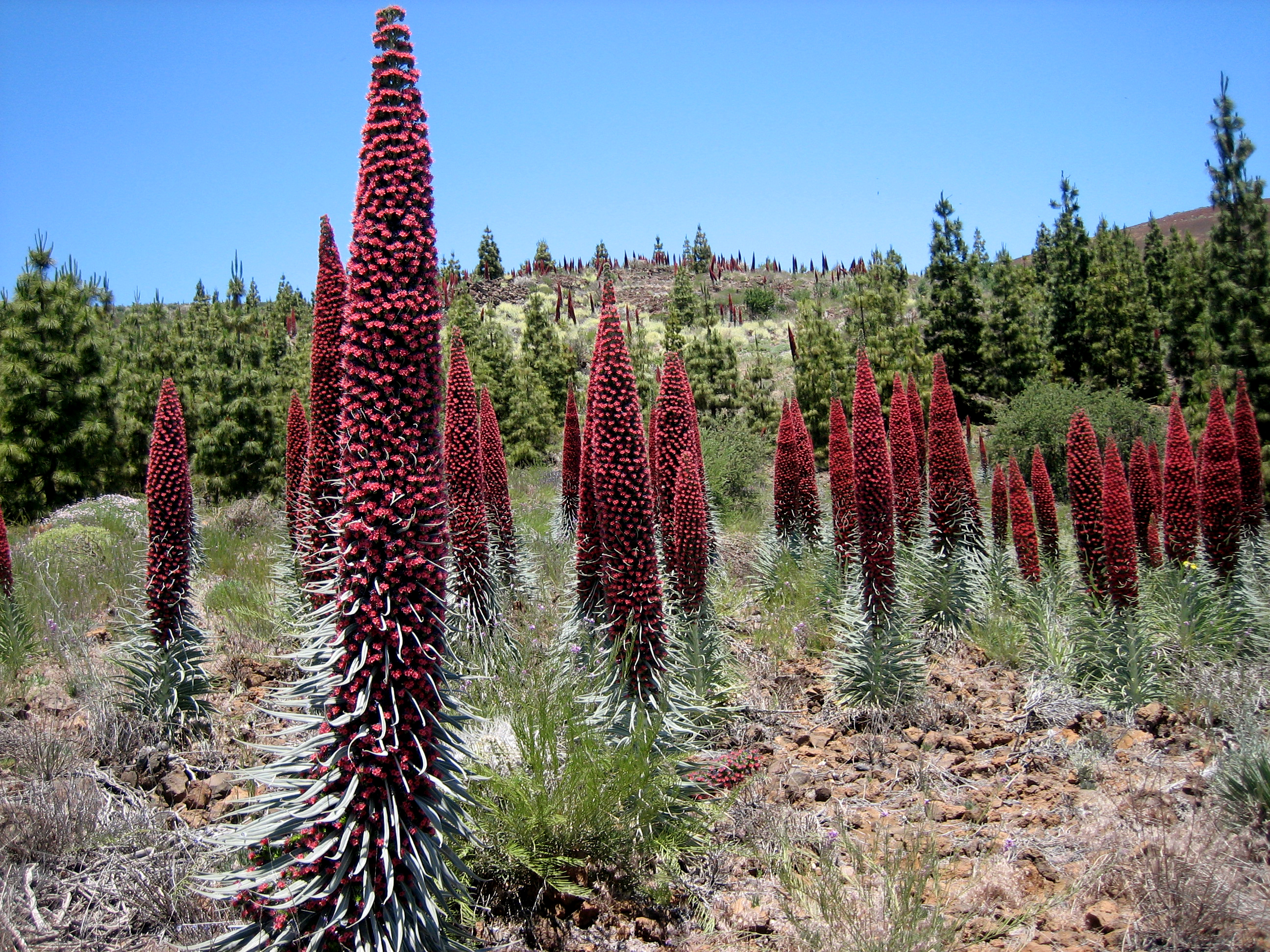
Echium wildpretii

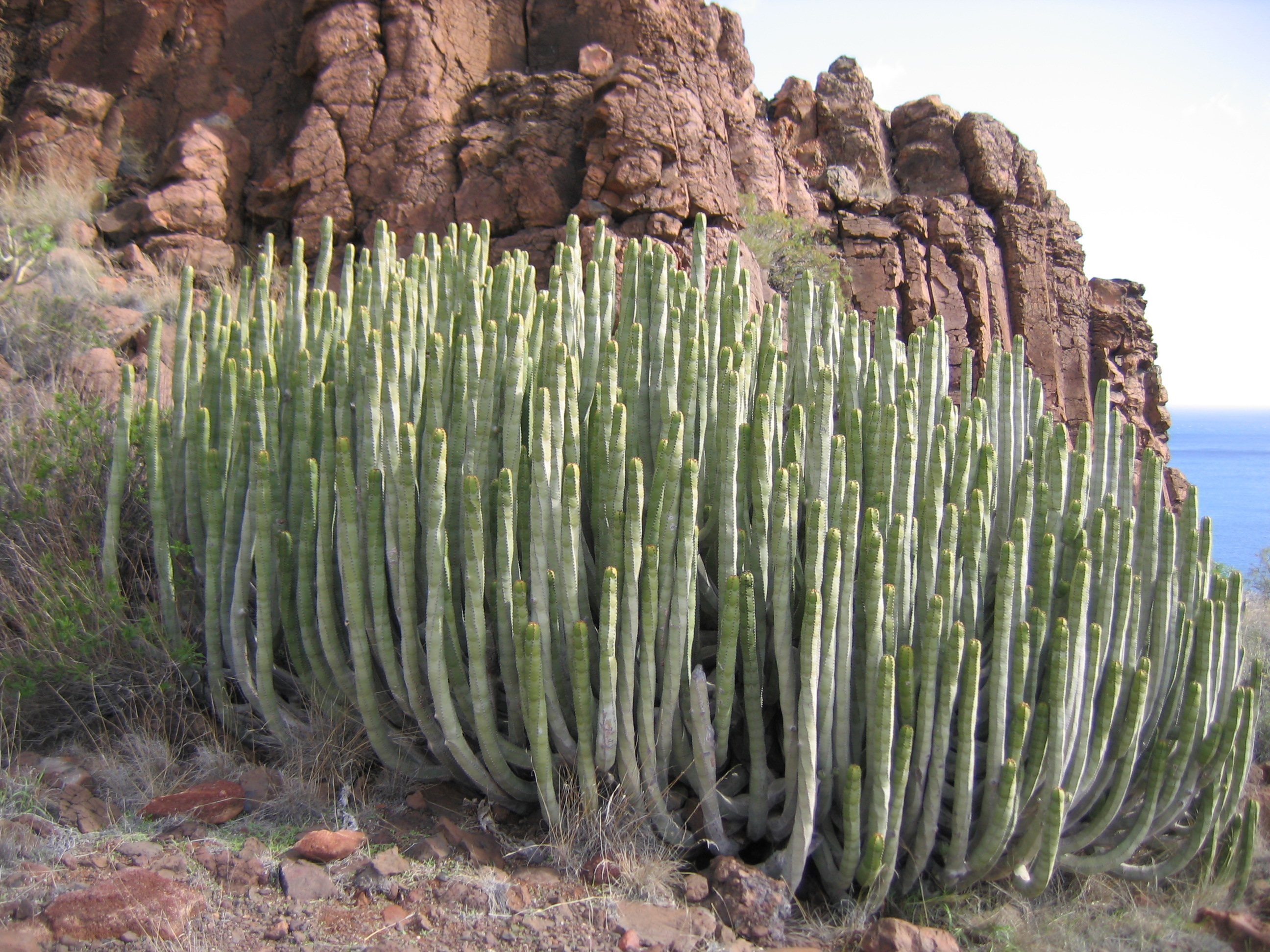
Euphorbia canariensis

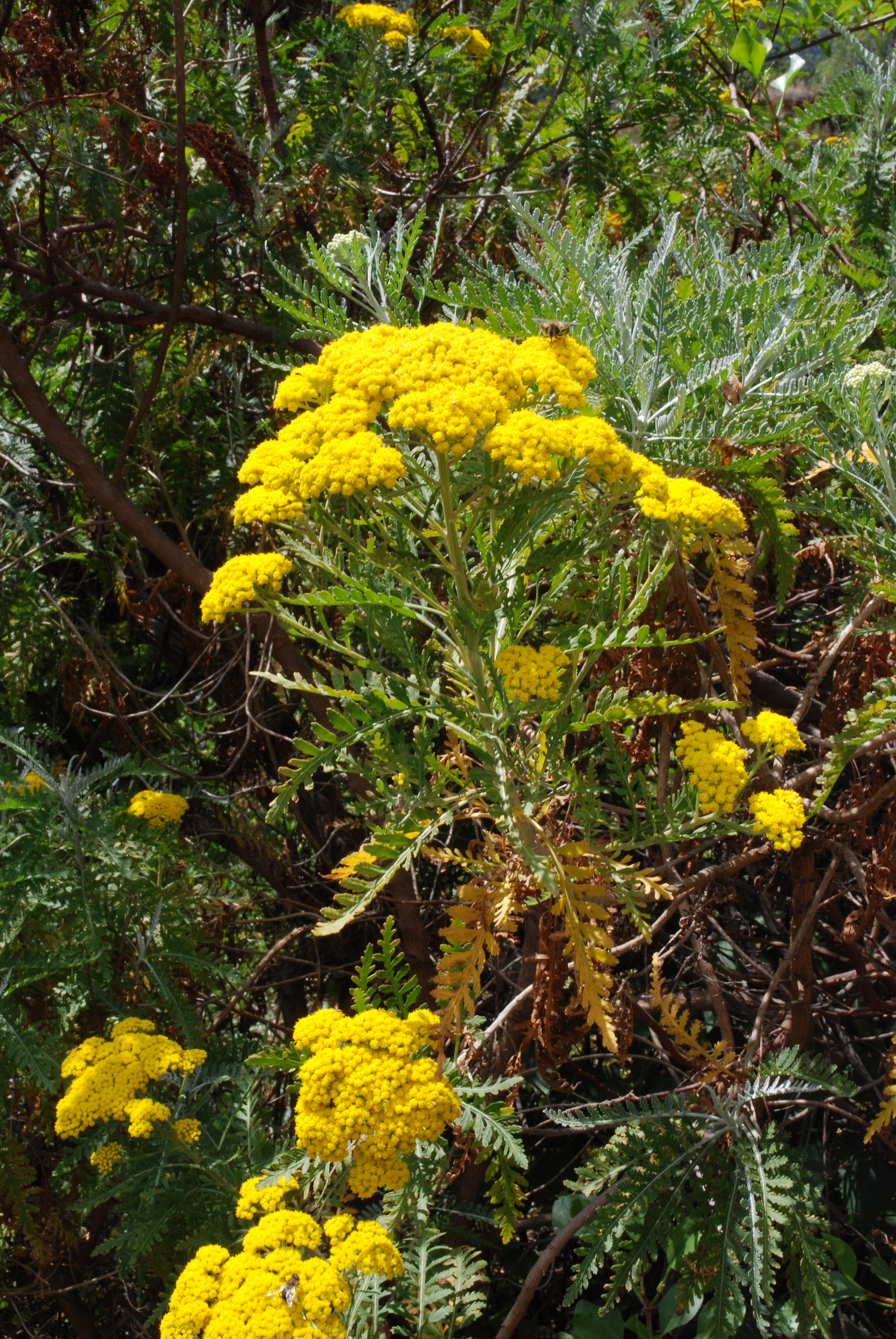
Gonospermum elegans

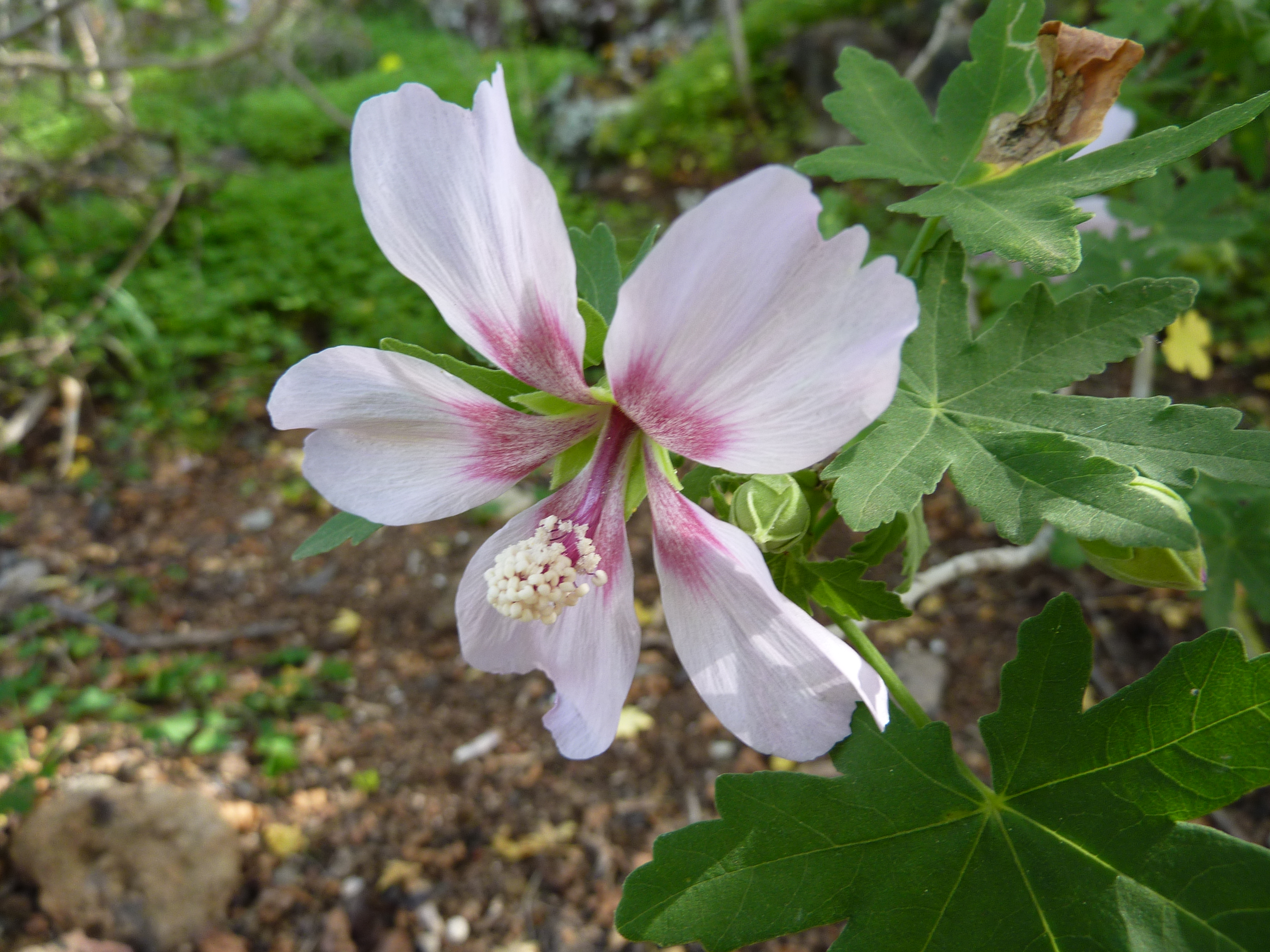
Lavatera acerifolia var. acerifolia

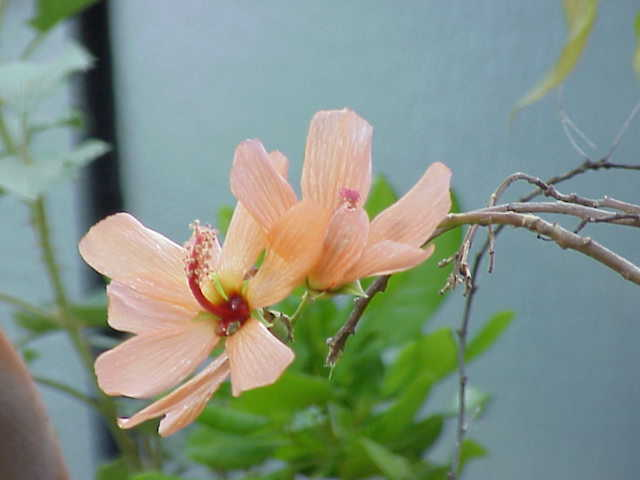
Lavatera phoenicea

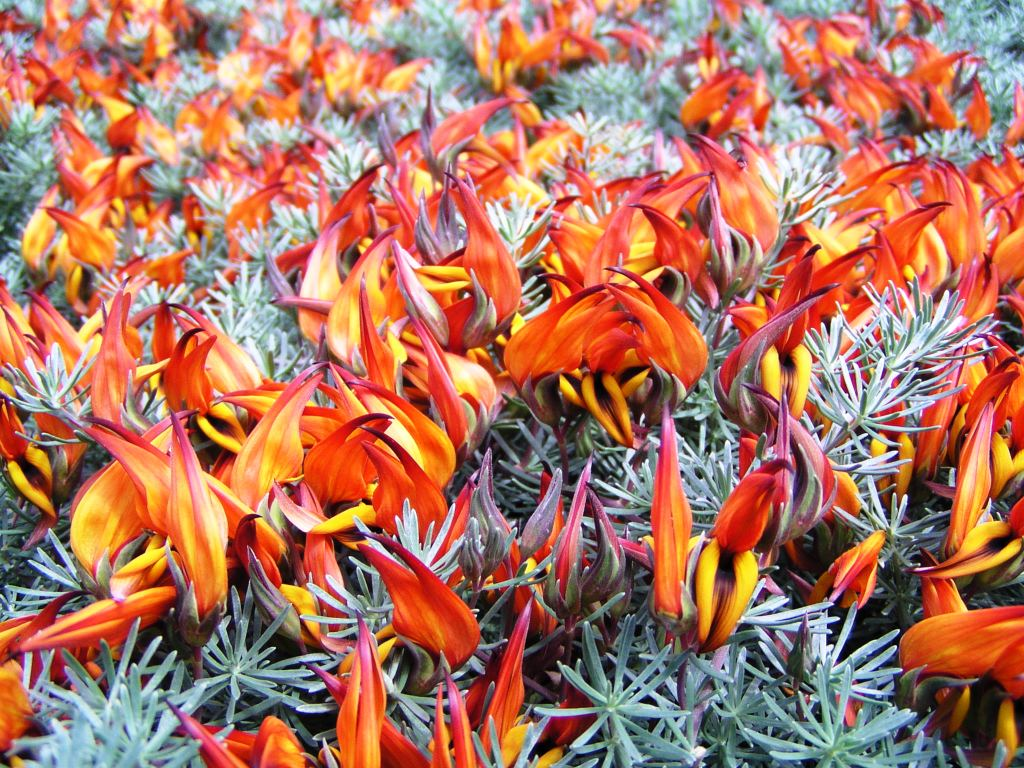
Lotus berthelotii

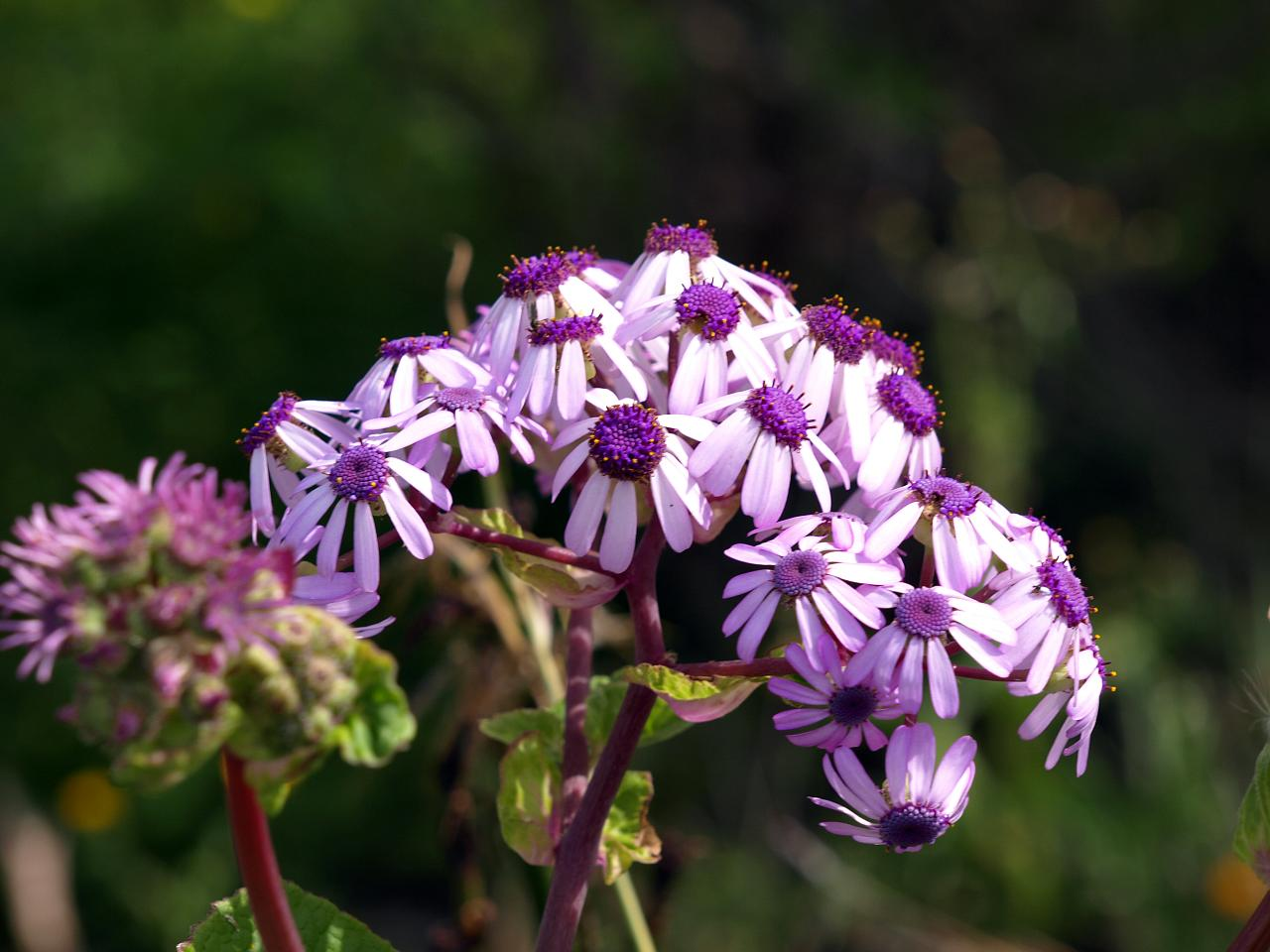
Pericallis webbii

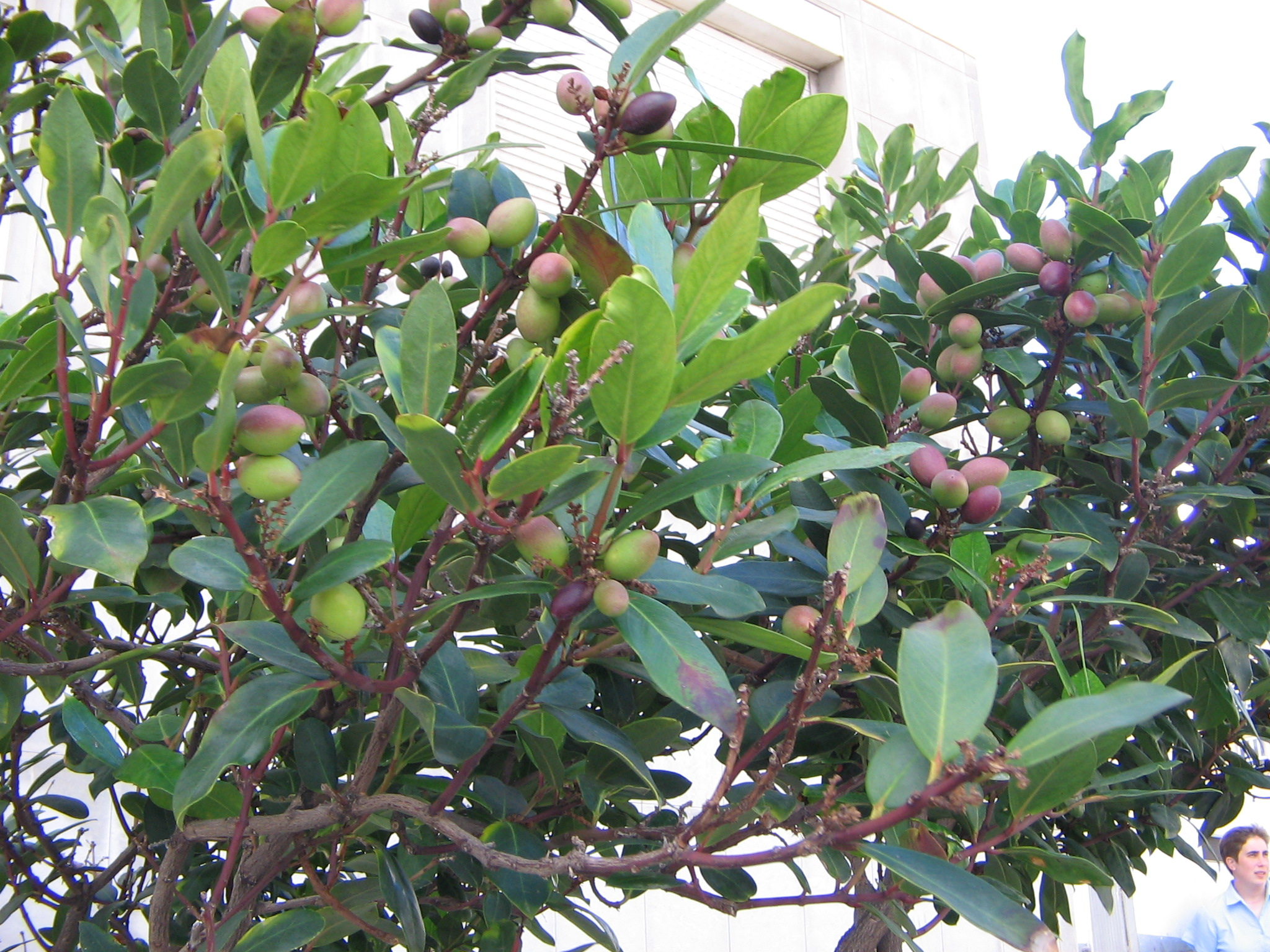
Persea indica

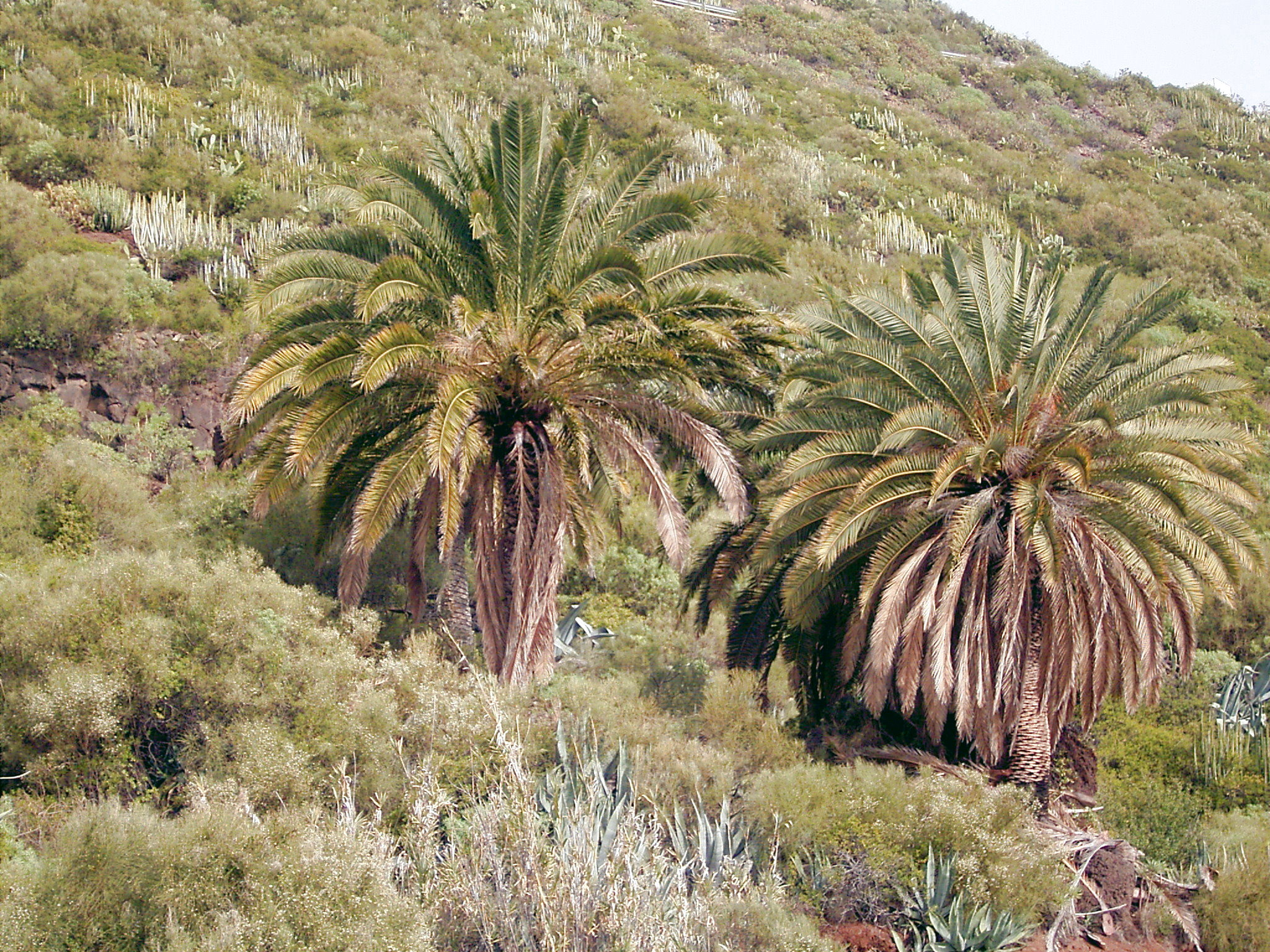
Phoenix canariensis

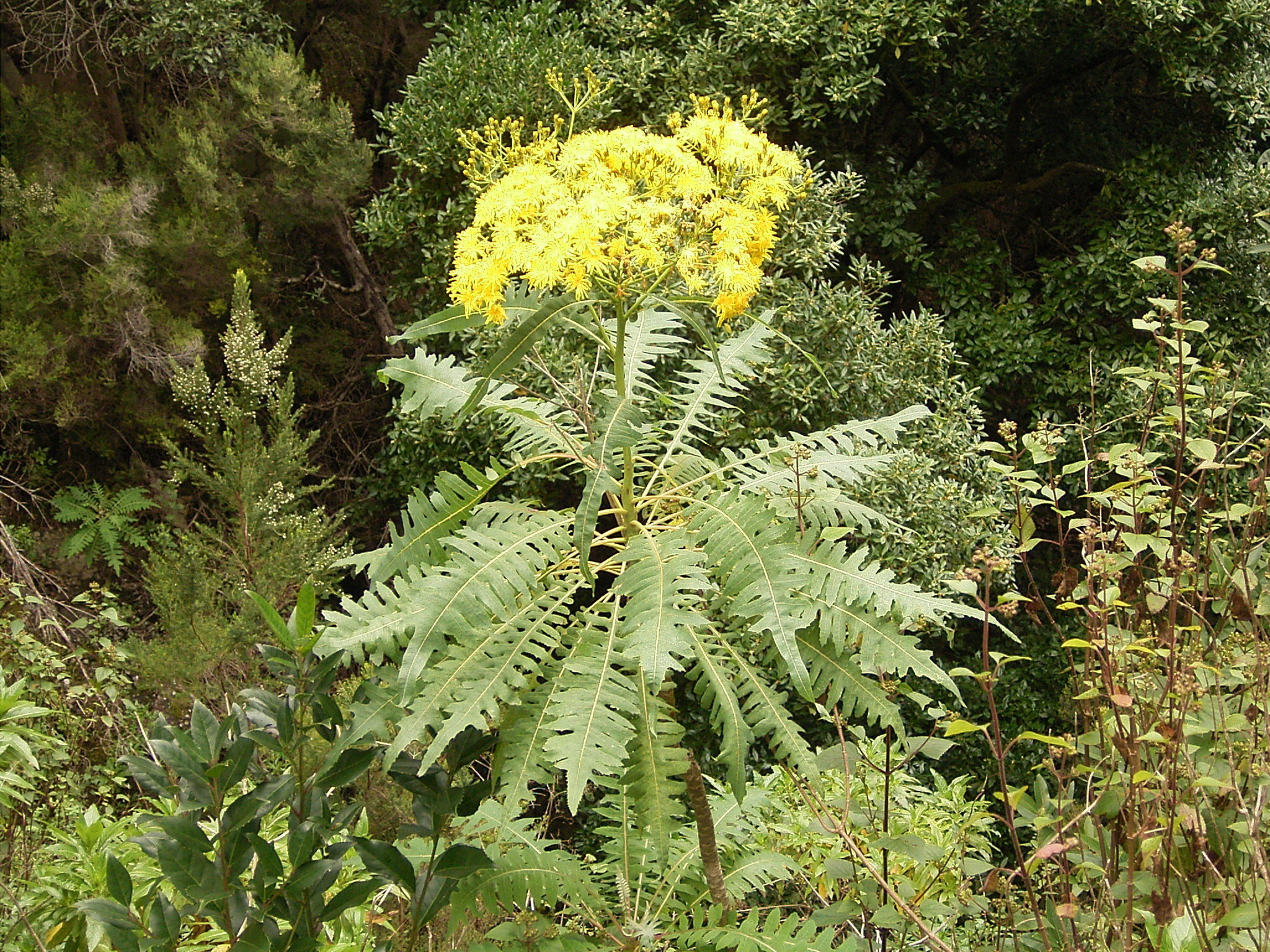
Sonchus palmensis

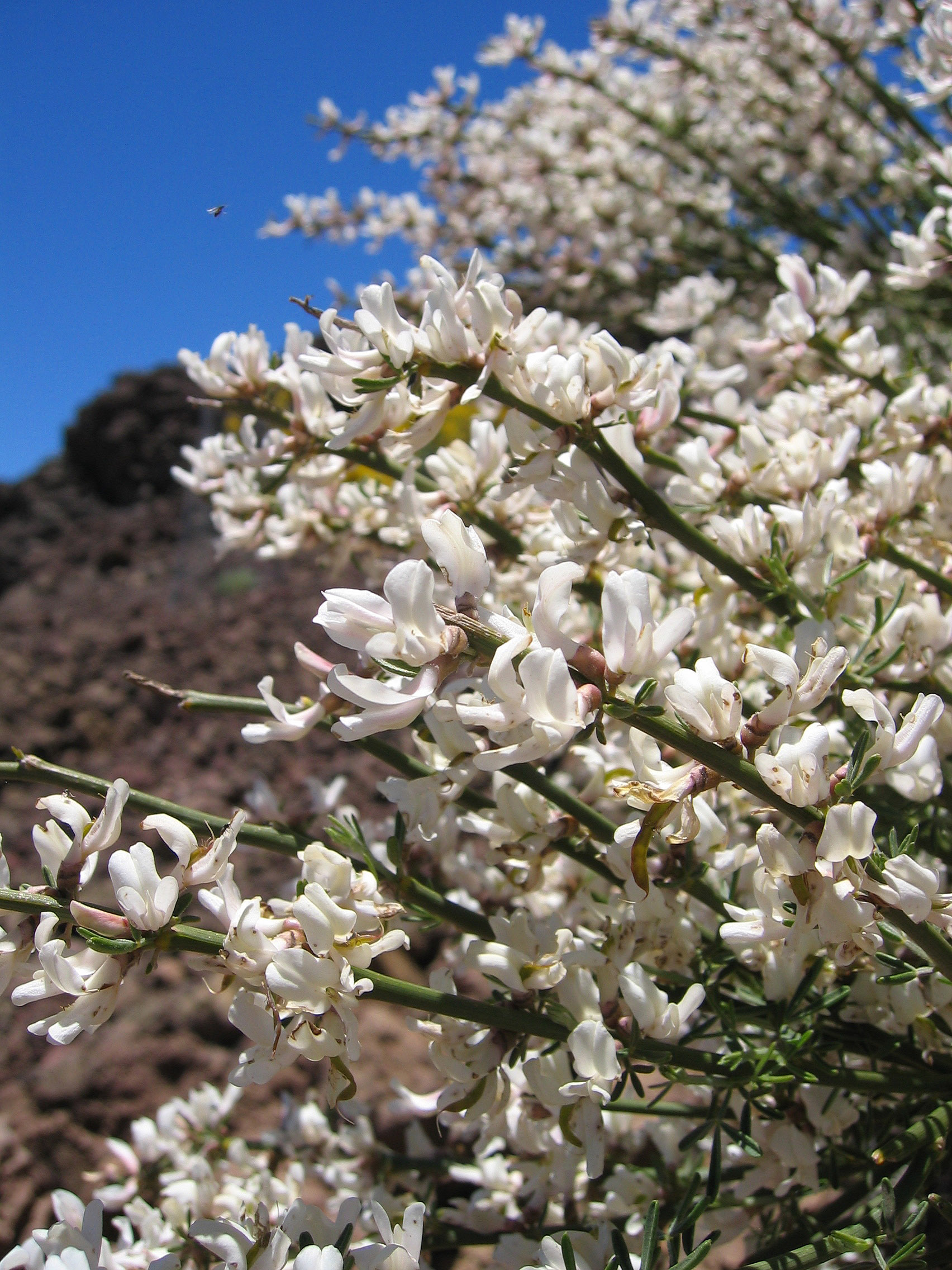
Cytisus supranubius

== Politics ==
The Province of Las Palmas (red)

The Province of Santa Cruz de Tenerife (red)

Municipalities in the Province of Las Palmas

Municipalities in the Province of Santa Cruz de Tenerife

=== Governance ===
The regional executive body, the Parliament of the Canary Islands, is presided over by Fernando Clavijo Batlle (Canarian Coalition), the current President of the Canary Islands. The members of the regional legislature, the Parliament of the Canary Islands, has 70 elected legislators. The last regional election took place in May 2023.

The islands have 14 seats in the Spanish Senate. Of these, 11 seats are directly elected, 3 for Gran Canaria, 3 for Tenerife, and 1 each for Lanzarote (including La Graciosa), Fuerteventura, La Palma, La Gomera and El Hierro. The other 3 are appointed by the regional legislature.

=== Political geography ===
The Autonomous Community of the Canary Islands has two provinces (provincias), Las Palmas and Santa Cruz de Tenerife, whose capitals, Las Palmas de Gran Canaria and Santa Cruz de Tenerife, are capitals of the autonomous community. Each of the seven major islands are ruled by an island council named a Cabildo Insular. Each island is subdivided into smaller municipalities (municipios). Las Palmas is divided into 34 municipalities, and Santa Cruz de Tenerife is divided into 54 municipalities.

Province	Capital	Population (2025)	Area (km^{2})	Density (inh./km^{2})	Municipalities
Las Palmas	Las Palmas	1,171,547	4,069.70	287.9	34
Santa Cruz de Tenerife	Santa Cruz de Tenerife	1,087,319	3,375.88	322.1	54

The international boundary of the Canaries is disputed in Morocco–Spain relations. In 2022 the UN declared the Canary Island's territorial waters as being Moroccan coast and Morocco has authorised gas and oil exploration in what the Canary Islands states to be Canarian territorial waters and Western Sahara waters. Morocco's official position is that international laws regarding territorial limits do not authorise Spain to claim seabed boundaries based on the territory of the Canaries, since the Canary Islands enjoy a large degree of autonomy. In fact, the islands do not enjoy any special degree of autonomy, as each one of the Spanish regions is considered an autonomous community, with equal status to the European ones. Under the Law of the Sea, the only islands not granted territorial waters or an exclusive economic zone (EEZ) are those that are not fit for human habitation, or do not have an economic life of their own, which is not the case of the Canary Islands.

=== Canarian nationalism ===
There are some pro-independence political parties, like the National Congress of the Canaries (CNC) and the Popular Front of the Canary Islands. Their popular support is almost insignificant, with no presence in either the autonomous parliament or the cabildos insulares. In a 2012 study by the Centro de Investigaciones Sociológicas, when asked about national identity, the majority of respondents from the Canary Islands (53.8%) considered themselves Spanish and Canarian in equal measures, followed by 24% who consider themselves more Canarian than Spanish. 6.1% of the respondents considered themselves only Canarian, and 7% considered themselves only Spanish.

=== Defence ===
The defence of the territory is the responsibility of the Spanish Armed Forces. Components of the Army, Navy, Air Force and the Civil Guard are based in the territory.

After the establishment of a democratic constitutional monarchy in Spain, autonomy was granted to the Canaries via a law passed in 1982, with a newly established autonomous devolved government and parliament. In 1983, the first autonomous elections were held. The Spanish Socialist Workers' Party (PSOE) won.

=== Capitals ===
At present, the Canary Islands is the only autonomous community in Spain that has two capitals: Santa Cruz de Tenerife and Las Palmas de Gran Canaria, since the Statute of Autonomy of the Canary Islands was created in 1982.

The political capital of the archipelago did not exist as such until the nineteenth century. The first cities founded by the Europeans at the time of the conquest of the Canary Islands in the 15th century were: Telde (in Gran Canaria), San Marcial del Rubicón (in Lanzarote) and Betancuria (in Fuerteventura). These cities boasted the first European institutions present in the archipelago, including Catholic bishoprics. Although, because the period of splendor of these cities developed before the total conquest of the archipelago and its incorporation into the Crown of Castile never had a political and real control of the entire Canary archipelago.

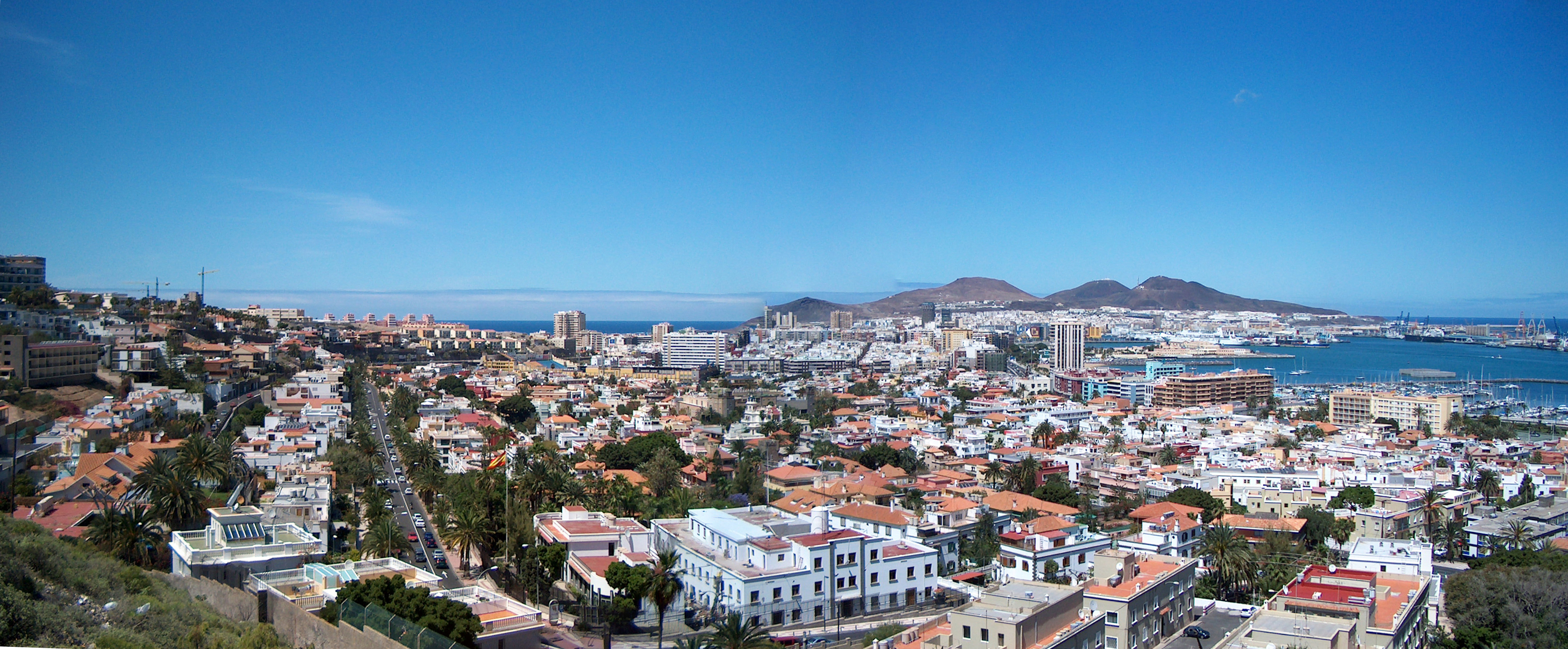
Overview of Las Palmas de Gran Canaria

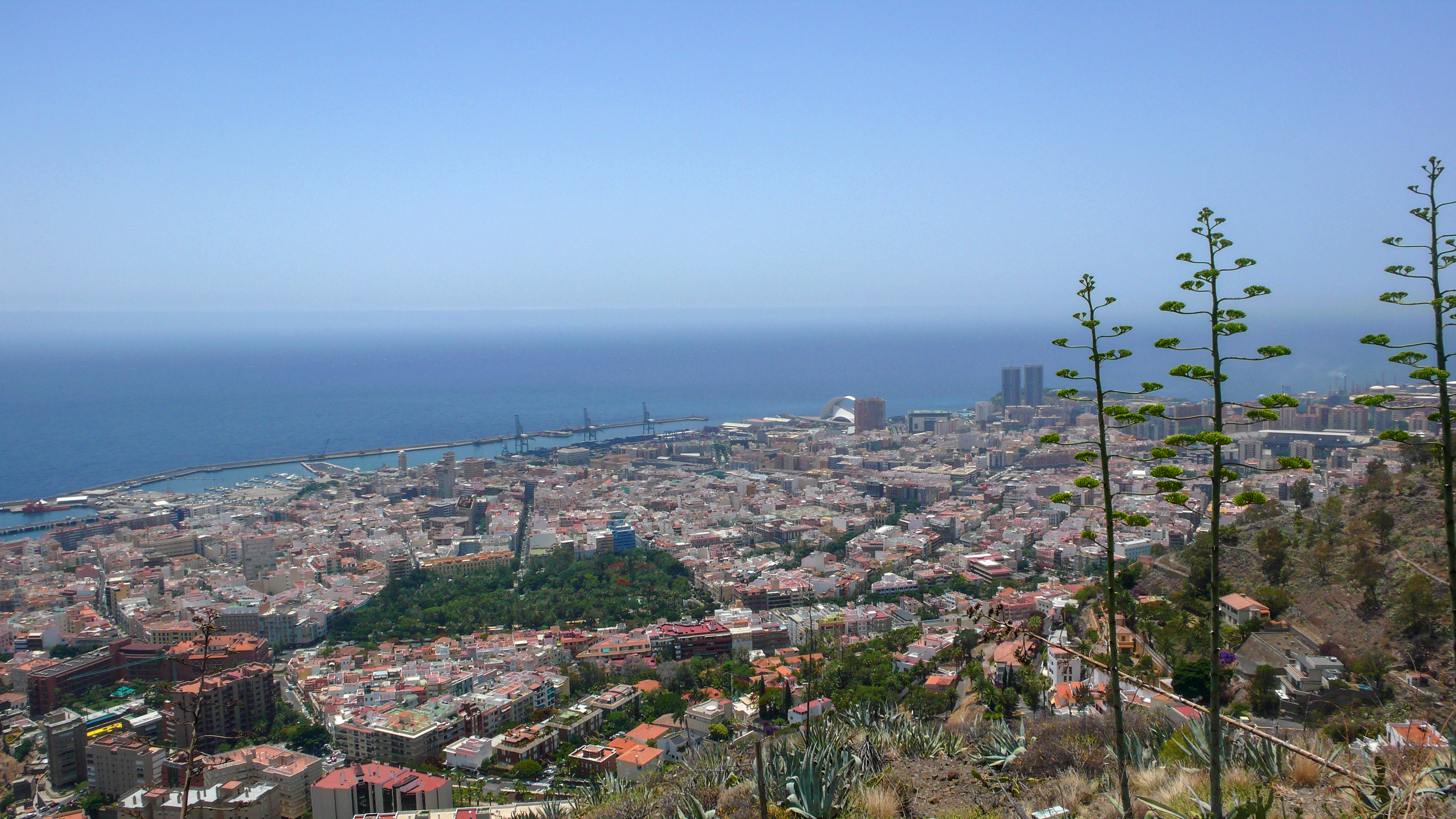
View of Santa Cruz de Tenerife

The function of a Canarian city with full jurisdiction for the entire archipelago only exists after the conquest of the Canary Islands, although originally de facto, that is, without legal and real meaning and linked to the headquarters of the Canary Islands General Captaincy.

Las Palmas de Gran Canaria was the first city that exercised this function. This is because the residence of the Captain General of the Canary Islands was in this city during part of the sixteenth and seventeenth centuries. In May 1661, the Captain General of the Canary Islands, Jerónimo de Benavente y Quiñones, moved the headquarters of the captaincy to the city of San Cristóbal de La Laguna on the island of Tenerife. This was due to the fact that this island since the conquest was the most populated, productive and with the highest economic expectations. La Laguna would be considered the de facto capital of the archipelago until the official status of the capital of Canary Islands in the city of Santa Cruz de Tenerife was confirmed in the 19th century, due in part to the constant controversies and rivalries between the bourgeoisies of San Cristóbal de La Laguna and Las Palmas de Gran Canaria for the economic, political and institutional hegemony of the archipelago.

Already in 1723, the Captain General of the Canary Islands Lorenzo Fernandez de Villavicencio had moved the headquarters of the General Captaincy of the Canary Islands from San Cristóbal de La Laguna to Santa Cruz de Tenerife. This decision continued without pleasing the society of the island of Gran Canaria. It would be after the creation of the Province of Canary Islands in November 1833 in which Santa Cruz would become the first fully official capital of the Canary Islands (De jure and not of de facto as happened previously). Santa Cruz de Tenerife would be the capital of the Canary archipelago until during the Government of General Primo de Rivera in 1927 the province of Canary Islands was split in two provinces: Las Palmas with capital in Las Palmas de Gran Canaria, and Santa Cruz de Tenerife with capital in the homonymous city.

Finally, with the Statute of Autonomy of the Canary Islands in 1982 and the creation of the Autonomous Community of the Canary Islands, the capital of the archipelago between Las Palmas de Gran Canaria and Santa Cruz de Tenerife is fixed, which is how it remains today.

== Demographics ==
Historical population
Year	Pop.	±%
1768	155,763	—
1787	168,928	+8.5%
1797	173,865	+2.9%
1842	241,266	+38.8%
1857	234,046	−3.0%
1877	284,857	+21.7%
1887	301,983	+6.0%
1900	364,408	+20.7%
1910	458,719	+25.9%
1920	488,483	+6.5%
1930	572,273	+17.2%
1940	687,937	+20.2%
1950	807,773	+17.4%
1960	966,177	+19.6%
1970	1,125,442	+16.5%
1981	1,367,646	+21.5%
1991	1,493,784	+9.2%
2001	1,694,477	+13.4%
2011	2,082,654	+22.9%
2021	2,178,924	+4.6%
Source: Government of the Canary Islands, INE

As of 2025, the population is 2,258,866, of which 49.4% are males, and 50.6% are females. Minors make up 14.3% of the population, and seniors make up 18.2%.

=== Immigration ===
As of 2025, immigrants make up 23.5% of the population. The 5 largest foreign countries of birth are Venezuela, Cuba, Colombia, Italy, and Morocco.

The Canary Islands have become home to many European residents, mainly coming from Italy, Germany and the UK. Because of the vast immigration to Venezuela and Cuba during the second half of the 20th century and the later return to the Canary Islands of these people along with their families, there are many residents whose country of origin was Venezuela (88,602) or Cuba (63,837). Since the 1990s, many illegal migrants have reached the Canary Islands, Melilla and Ceuta, using them as entry points to the EU. A record number of 46,843 migrants, mostly from Senegal, Mali and Morocco, arrived illegally in the Canary Islands in 2024, up from 39,910 in 2023.

Places of birth (2025)
Birthplace	Population	Share
Spain	1,729,127	76.5%
Canary Islands	1,541,077	68.2%
Rest of Spain	188,050	8.3%
Foreign-born	529,739	23.5%
Americas	282,082	12.5%
Venezuela	88,602	3.9%
Cuba	63,837	2.8%
Colombia	54,362	2.4%
Argentina	21,532	1.0%
Uruguay	9,335	0.4%
Rest of Europe	172,022	7.6%
Italy	43,162	1.9%
Germany	27,406	1.2%
United Kingdom	26,214	1.2%
Africa	50,998	2.3%
Morocco	30,852	1.4%
Asia	24,267	1.1%
China	9,565	0.4%
India	6,173	0.3%
Oceania	370	0.0%
Total	2,258,866	100.0%

=== Religion ===
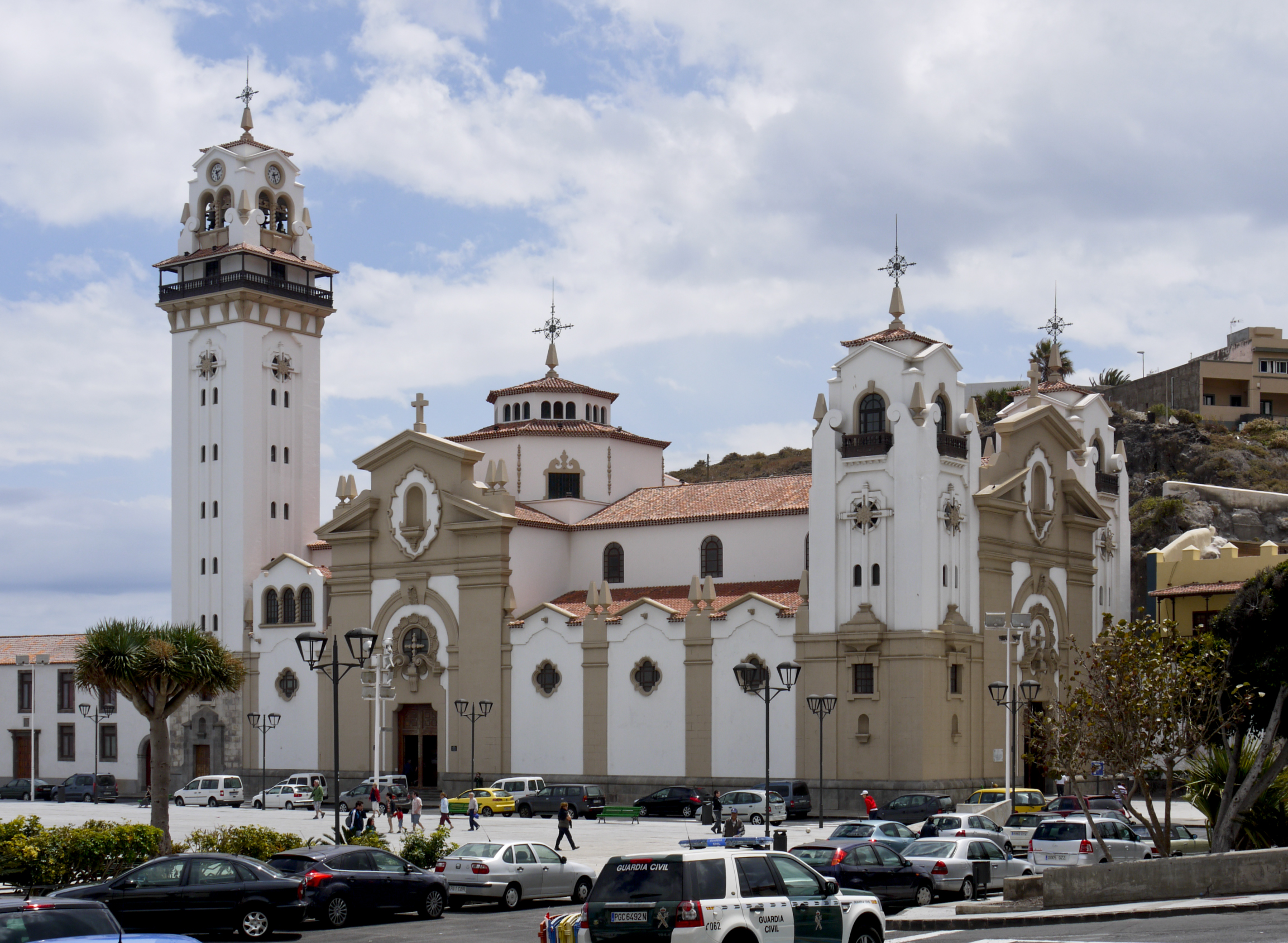
Basilica of the Virgin of Candelaria (Patroness of the Canary Islands) in Candelaria, Tenerife

The distribution of beliefs in 2012 according to the CIS Barometer Autonomy was as follows:

- Catholic 84.9%
- Atheist/Agnostic/Nonbeliever 12.3%
- Other religions 1.7%

The Catholic Church has been the majority religion in the archipelago for more than five centuries, ever since the Conquest of the Canary Islands. There are also several other religious communities.

==== Roman Catholic Church ====
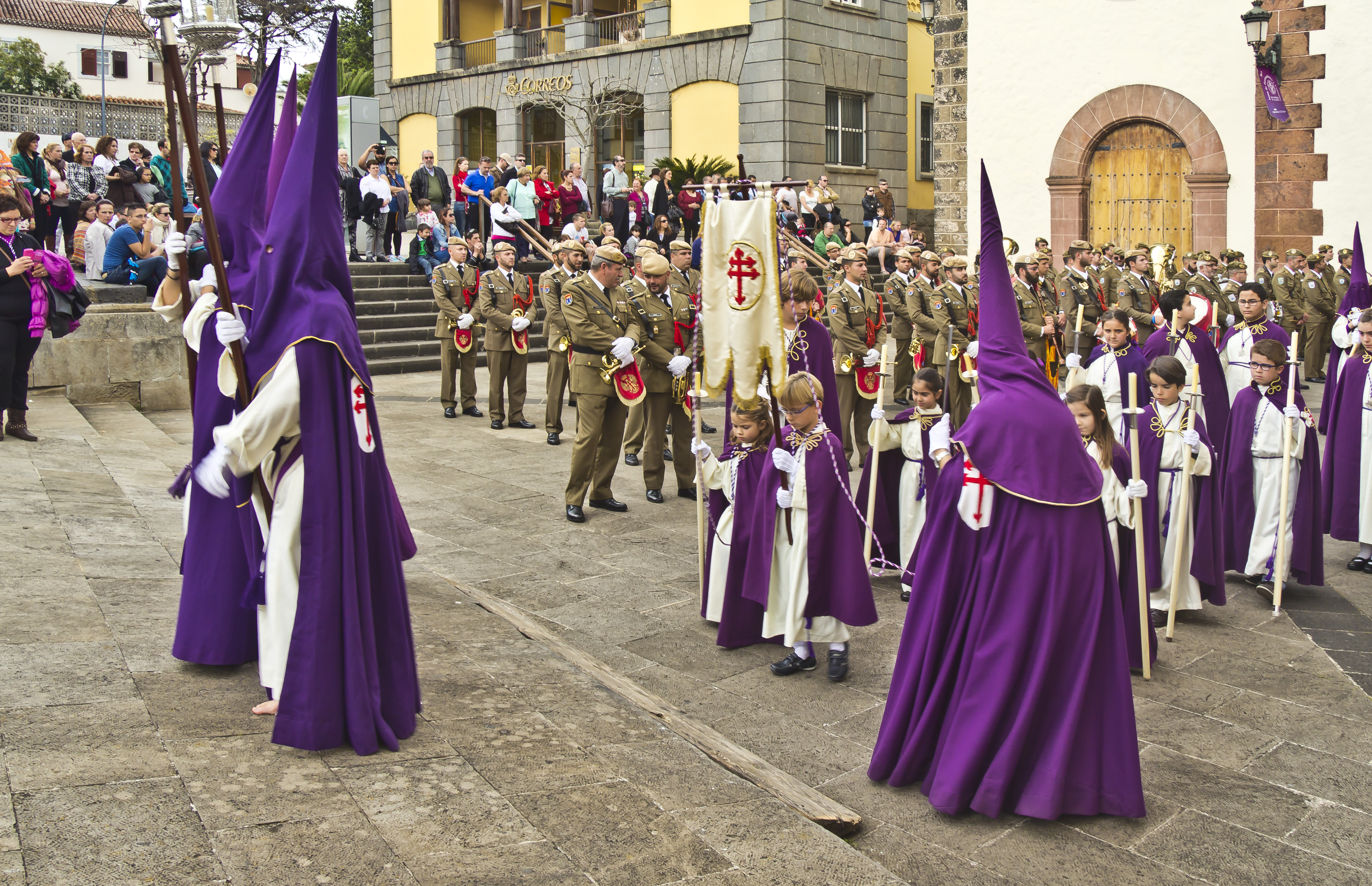
Procession of Holy Week in San Cristóbal de La Laguna

The overwhelming majority of native Canarians are Roman Catholic (76.7%) with various smaller foreign-born populations of other Christian beliefs such as Protestants.

The appearance of the Virgin of Candelaria (Patron of Canary Islands) was credited with moving the Canary Islands toward Christianity. Two Catholic saints were born in the Canary Islands: Peter of Saint Joseph de Betancur and José de Anchieta. Both born on the island of Tenerife, they were respectively missionaries in Guatemala and Brazil.

The Canary Islands are divided into two Catholic dioceses, each governed by a bishop:

- Diócesis Canariense: Includes the islands of the Eastern Province: Gran Canaria, Fuerteventura and Lanzarote. Its capital was San Marcial El Rubicón (1404) and Las Palmas de Gran Canaria (1483–present). There was a previous bishopric which was based in Telde, but it was later abolished.
- Diócesis Nivariense: Includes the islands of the western province: Tenerife, La Palma, La Gomera and El Hierro. Its capital is San Cristóbal de La Laguna (1819–present).

==== Other religions ====
Separate from the overwhelming Catholic majority are a minority of Muslims. Among the followers of Islam, the Islamic Federation of the Canary Islands exists to represent the Islamic community in the Canary Islands as well as to provide practical support to members of the Islamic community. For its part, there is also the Evangelical Council of the Canary Islands in the archipelago.

Other religious faiths represented include Jehovah's Witnesses, The Church of Jesus Christ of Latter-day Saints as well as Hinduism. Minority religions are also present such as the Church of the Guanche People which is classified as a neo-pagan native religion. Also present are Buddhism, Judaism, Baháʼí, African religion, and Chinese religions.

=== Population genetics ===
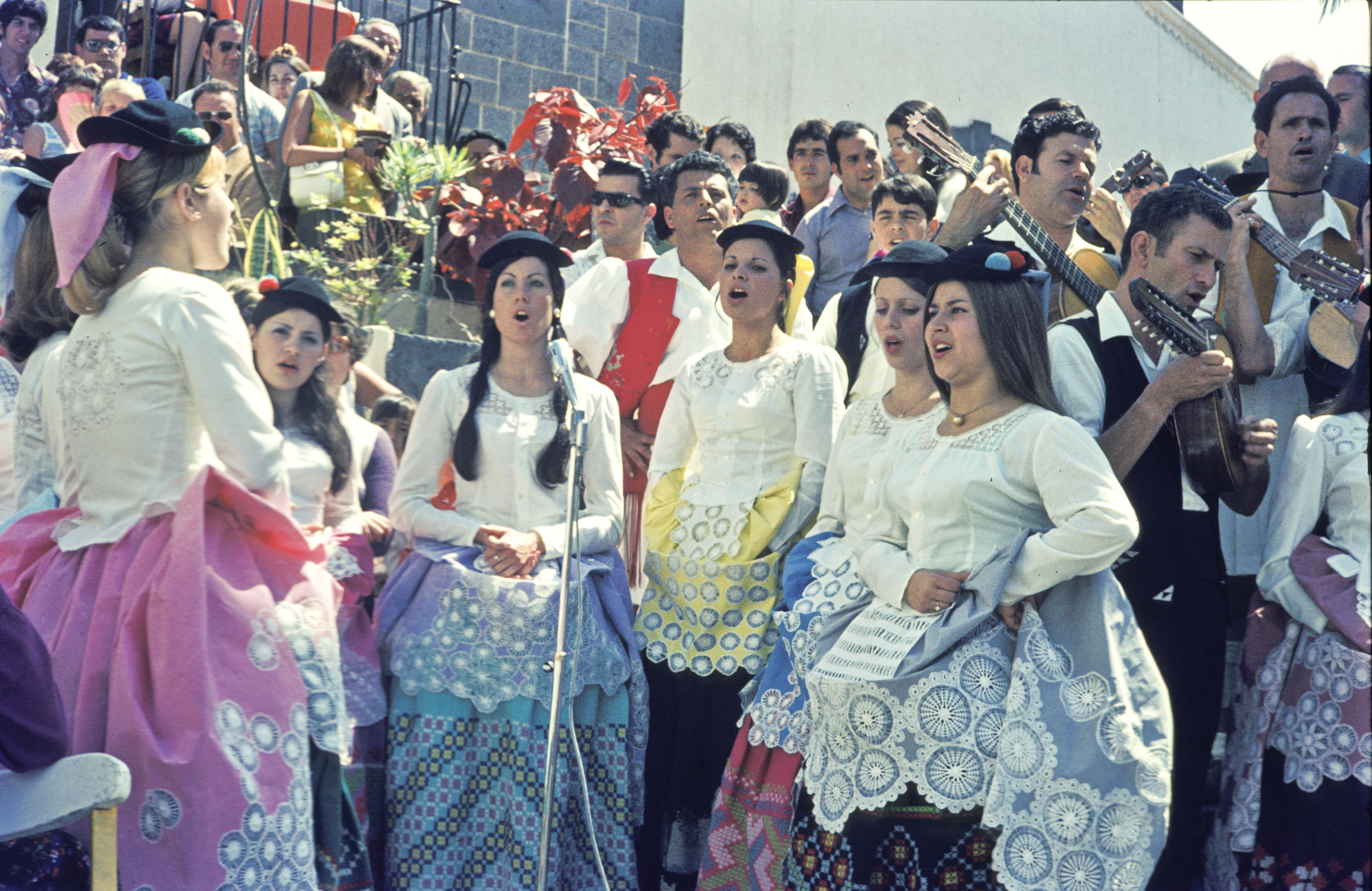
Canarian women singing in Gran Canaria, 1972

The native inhabitants of the Canary Islands hold a gene pool that is predominantly European and native Guanche. It was found that Guanche males contributed less to the gene pool of modern Canary Islanders than Guanche females. Haplogroups typical among the Guanche have been found at high frequencies in Latin America, suggesting that descendants of the Guanche played an active role in the Spanish colonisation of the Americas.

In 2017, the first genome-wide data from the Guanches confirmed a North African origin and that they were genetically most similar to ancient North African Berber peoples of the nearby North African mainland. It also showed that modern inhabitants of Gran Canaria carry an estimated 16%–31% Guanche autosomal ancestry. A 2018 genetic study found that the Canarian population is, on average at an autosomal level, 75–83% European, 17–23% North African and 3% Sub-saharan.

== Culture ==
=== Holidays ===
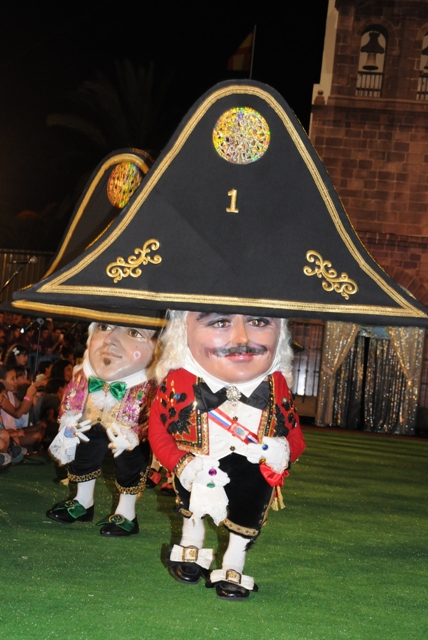
The Dance of the Dwarves is one of the most important acts of the Lustral Festivities of the Bajada de la Virgen de las Nieves in Santa Cruz de La Palma.

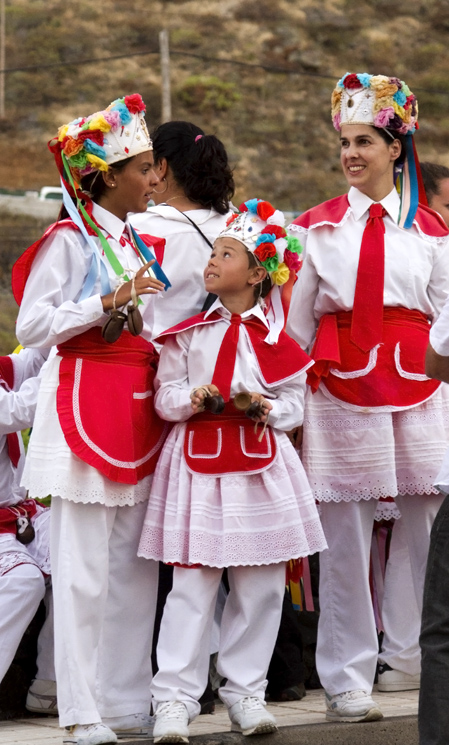
Dancers with typical costume in El Tamaduste (El Hierro)

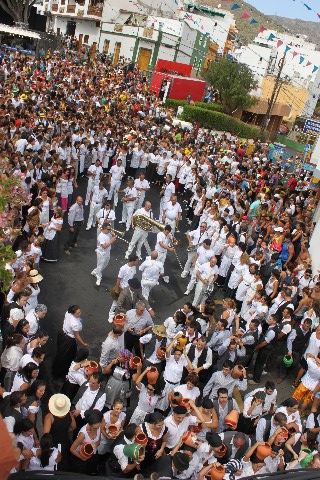
Band of Agaete in the Traída del Agua (Gran Canaria)

Some holidays of those celebrated in the Canary Islands are international and national, others are regional holidays and others are of insular character. The official day of the autonomous community is Canary Islands Day on 30 May. The anniversary of the first session of the Parliament of the Canary Islands, based in the city of Santa Cruz de Tenerife, held on 30 May 1983, is commemorated with this day.

The common festive calendar throughout the Canary Islands is as follows:

Date	Name	Description / details
1 January	New Year	International festival.
6 January	Epiphany	Catholic festival.
March or April	Holy Thursday and Holy Friday	Christian festival.
1 May	International Workers' Day	International festival.
30 May	Canary Islands Day	Day of the autonomous community. Anniversary of the first session of the Parliament of the Canary Islands.
15 August	Assumption of Mary	Catholic festival. This day is festive in the archipelago as in all of Spain. Popularly, in the Canary Islands it is known as the day on which the Virgin of Candelaria (Saint Patron of Canary Islands) is celebrated.
12 October	Fiesta Nacional de España (Día de la Hispanidad)	National Holiday of Spain. Commemoration of discovery of the Americas.
1 November	All Saints' Day	Catholic festival.
6 December	Constitution Day	Commemoration of the Spanish constitutional referendum, 1978.
8 December	Immaculate Conception	Catholic festival. The Immaculate Conception is the Saint Patron of Spain.
25 December	Christmas	Christian festival. Commemoration of the birth of Jesus of Nazareth.

In addition, each of the islands has an island festival, in which it is a holiday only on that specific island. These are the festivities of island patrons saints of each island. Organised chronologically are:

Date	Island	Saint/Virgin
2 February	Tenerife	Our Lady of Candelaria
5 August	La Palma	Our Lady of the Snows
8 September	Gran Canaria	Our Lady of the Pine
15 September	Lanzarote	Our Lady of Dolours
Third Saturday of the month of September	Fuerteventura	Our Lady of the Peña
24 September	El Hierro	Our Lady of the Kings
Monday following the first Saturday of October	La Gomera	Our Lady of Guadalupe

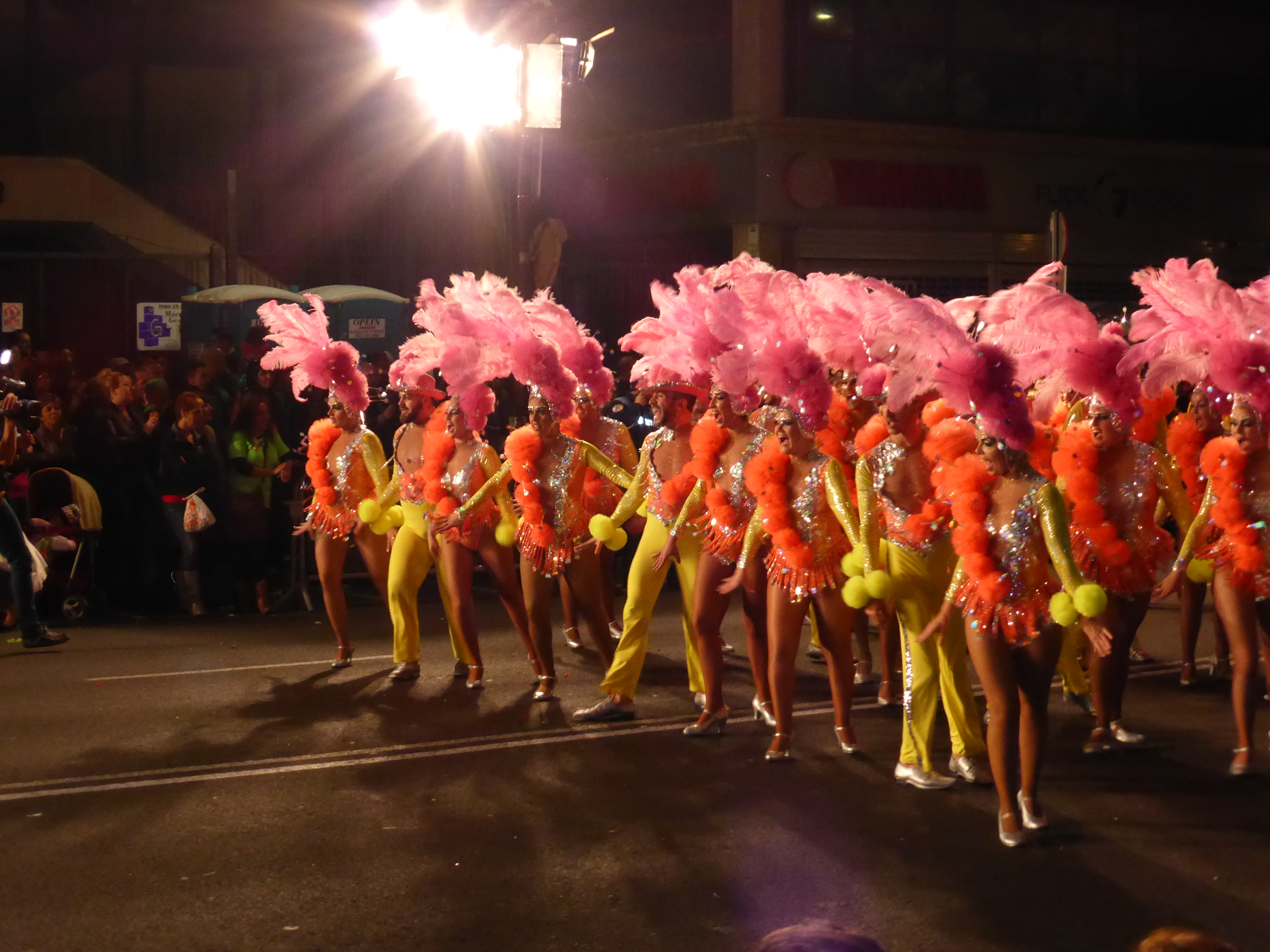
Parade in the Carnival of Santa Cruz de Tenerife

The most famous festivals of the Canary Islands is the carnival. It is the most famous and international festival of the archipelago. The carnival is celebrated in all the islands and all its municipalities, perhaps the two busiest are those of the two Canarian capitals; the Carnival of Santa Cruz de Tenerife (Tourist Festival of International Interest) and the Carnival of Las Palmas de Gran Canaria. It is celebrated on the streets between the months of February and March. But the rest of the islands of the archipelago have their carnivals with their own traditions among which stand out: The Festival of the Carneros of El Hierro, the Festival of the Diabletes of Teguise in Lanzarote, Los Indianos de La Palma, the Carnival of San Sebastián de La Gomera and the Carnival of Puerto del Rosario in Fuerteventura.

== Economy and environment ==
Tourism in the Canary Islands
Year	Visitors
2024	17,767,834
2023	16,210,910
2010	10,432,047
2008	9,210,509
2007	9,326,116
2006	9,530,039
2005	9,276,963
2004	9,427,265
2003	9,836,785
2002	9,778,512
2001	10,137,205
2000	9,975,977
1993	6,545,396
Largest by Country (2008)	Population
United Kingdom	3,355,942
Germany	2,498,847

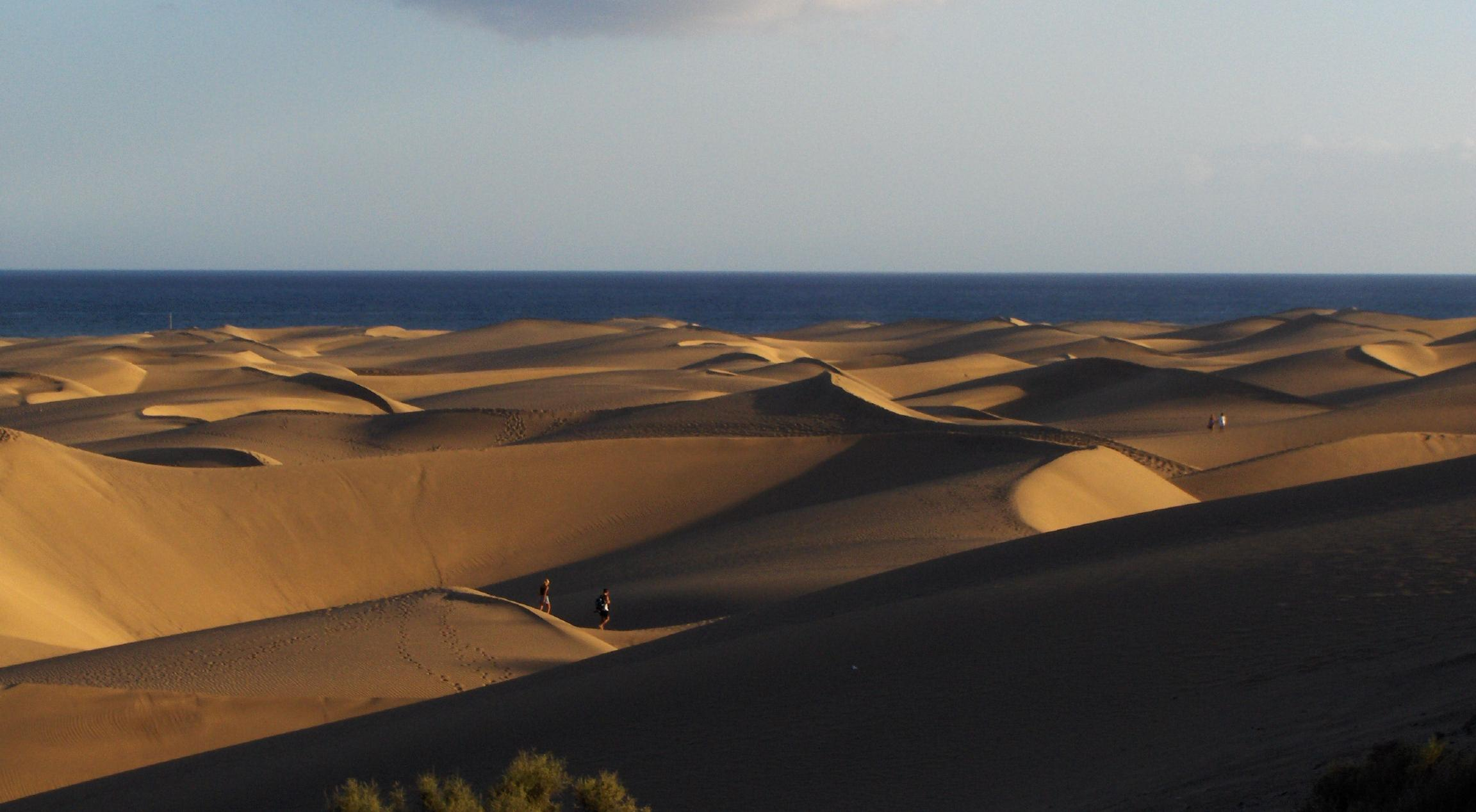
The dunes of Maspalomas in Gran Canaria is one of the tourist attractions.

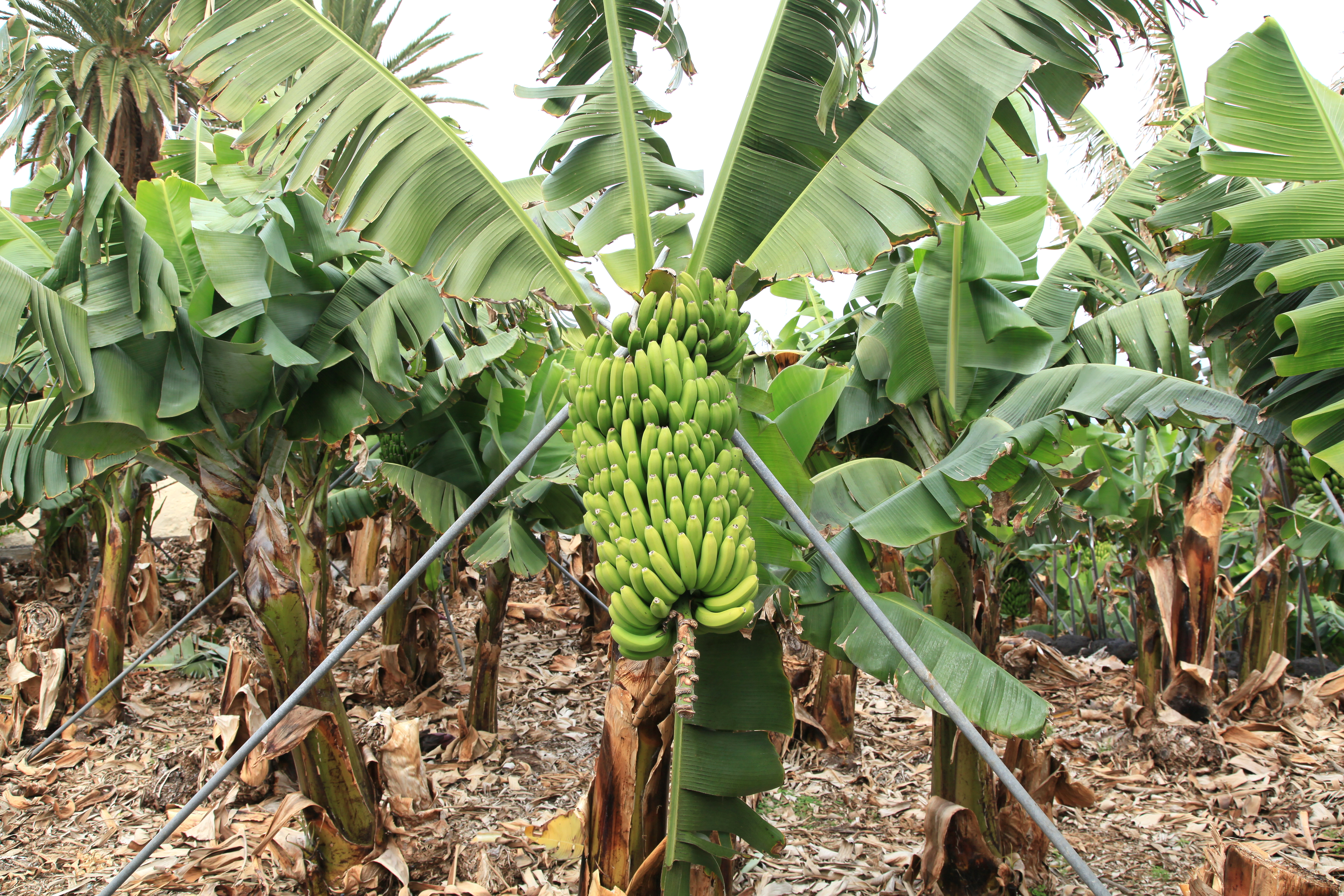
A banana plantation in San Andrés y Sauces

The economy is based primarily on tourism, which makes up 32% of the GDP. The Canaries receive about 12 million tourists per year. Construction makes up nearly 20% of the GDP and tropical agriculture, primarily bananas and tobacco, are grown for export to Europe and the Americas. Ecologists are concerned that the resources, especially in the more arid islands, are being overexploited but there are still many agricultural resources like tomatoes, potatoes, onions, cochineal, sugarcane, grapes, vines, dates, oranges, lemons, figs, wheat, barley, maize, apricots, peaches and almonds.

Water resources are also being overexploited, due to the high water usage by tourists. Also, some islands (such as Gran Canaria and Tenerife) overexploit the ground water. This is done in such degree that, according to European and Spanish legal regulations, the current situation is not acceptable. To address the problems, good governance and a change in the water use paradigm have been proposed. These solutions depend largely on controlling water use and on demand management. As this is administratively difficult and politically unpalatable, most action is currently directed at increasing the public offer of water through import from outside; a decision which is economically, politically and environmentally questionable.

To bring in revenue for environmental protection, innovation, training and water sanitation a tourist tax was considered in 2018, along with a doubling of the ecotax and restrictions on holiday rents in the zones with the greatest pressure of demand.

The economy is € 25 billion (2001 GDP figures). The islands experienced continuous growth during a 20-year period, up until 2001, at a rate of approximately 5% annually. This growth was fueled mainly by huge amounts of foreign direct investment, mostly to develop tourism real estate (hotels and apartments), and European Funds (near €11 billion in the period from 2000 to 2007), since the Canary Islands are labelled Region Objective 1 (eligible for euro structural funds). Additionally, the EU allows the Canary Islands Government to offer special tax concessions for investors who incorporate under the Zona Especial Canaria (ZEC) regime and create more than five jobs.

Spain gave permission in August 2014 for Repsol and its partners to explore oil and natural gas prospects off the Canary Islands, involving an investment of €7.5 billion over four years, to commence at the end of 2016. Repsol at the time said the area could ultimately produce 100,000 barrels of oil a day, which would meet 10 percent of Spain's energy needs. However, the analysis of samples obtained did not show the necessary volume nor quality to consider future extraction, and the project was scrapped.

Despite currently having very high dependence on fossil fuels, research on the renewable energy potential concluded that a high potential for renewable energy technologies exists on the archipelago. This, in such extent even that a scenario pathway to 100% renewable energy supply by 2050 has been put forward.

The Canary Islands have great natural attractions, climate and beaches make the islands a major tourist destination, being visited each year by about 12 million people (11,986,059 in 2007, comprising 29% Britons, 22% Spanish from outside the Canaries, and 21% Germans). Among the islands, Tenerife receives the largest number of tourists annually, followed by Gran Canaria and Lanzarote. The archipelago's principal tourist attraction is the Teide National Park in Tenerife where the highest mountain in Spain and third largest volcano in the world (Mount Teide) receives over 2.8 million visitors annually.

The combination of high mountains, proximity to Europe, and clean air has made the Roque de los Muchachos peak (on La Palma island) a leading location for telescopes like the Grantecan.

The islands, as an autonomous region of Spain, are in the European Union and the Schengen Area. They are in the European Union Customs Union but outside the VAT area. Instead of VAT there is a local Sales Tax (IGIC) which has a general rate of 7%, an increased tax rate of 13.5%, a reduced tax rate of 3% and a zero tax rate for certain basic need products and services. Consequently, some products are subject to additional VAT if being exported from the islands into mainland Spain or the rest of the EU. This VAT plus transportation costs make it very difficult for small Canarian shops to sell to the rest of Spain. The transportation costs are even higher outside of Tenerife and Gran Canaria.

Canarian time is Western European Time (WET), or GMT. In summer, one hour ahead of GMT. Canarian time is one hour behind mainland Spain, and the same time as the UK, Ireland and mainland Portugal all year round.

=== Tourism statistics ===
The number of tourists who visited the Canary Islands in 2022 was 14,617,383. In 2023, there were 16,210,911 arrivals.

Number of tourists who visited the Canary Islands in 2023, by island of destination
Rank	Island	Number of Visitors
1	Tenerife	6,449,359
2	Gran Canaria	4,235,141
3	Lanzarote	3,049,188
4	Fuerteventura	2,274,859
5	La Palma	148,720
6	La Gomera and El Hierro	53,644

Number of tourists who visited the Canary Islands by air, by island of destination
Month	Lanzarote	Fuerteventura	Gran Canaria	Tenerife	La Palma
2020 May	0	0	0	0	0
2020 April	0	0	0	0	0
2020 March	99,407	71,988	141,692	208,696	11,531
2020 February	215,054	175,618	387,432	528,873	31,996
2020 January	209,769	149,140	405,208	512,153	36,618
2020	524,230	396,746	934,332	1,249,722	80,145
2019 December	256,733	168,717	416,723	526,258	35,515
2019 November	231,995	159,352	405,715	487,576	29,614
2019 October	258,722	175,472	354,718	484,905	24,506
2019 September	235,534	154,056	291,855	432,241	21,106
2019 August	273,783	175,153	328,921	501,712	26,465
2019 July	270,438	171,819	333,530	481,976	22,059
2019 June	242,901	159,945	274,881	451,244	18,266
2019 May	230,821	140,370	261,250	423,740	19,447
2019 April	256,776	179,318	324,647	484,097	32,927
2019 March	295,614	201,556	447,905	579,224	39,570
2019 February	272,428	164,970	403,123	513,880	32,162
2019 January	239,830	172,468	424,117	522,601	42,043
2019	3,065,575	2,023,196	4,267,385	5,889,454	343,680
2018 December	258,185	171,248	420,041	519,566	34,266
2018 November	256,755	163,189	410,456	513,953	40,401
2018 October	265,950	207,176	397,411	541,492	27,865
2018 September	249,877	181,272	326,673	451,957	22,094
2018 August	260,216	206,718	370,232	516,048	28,054
2018 July	258,746	208,723	374,844	485,961	23,453
2018 June	233,824	181,406	301,068	448,667	19,384
2018 May	245,563	159,808	285,178	421,763	22,702
2018 April	266,433	184,772	347,043	488,679	30,675
2018 March	299,270	223,478	441,620	572,515	35,369
2018 February	246,215	181,218	396,707	484,485	40,282
2018 January	222,283	184,199	438,555	503,856	50,215
2018	3,063,317	2,253,207	4,509,828	5,948,942	374,760
Source (05/2020):

=== GDP statistics ===
The Gross Domestic Product (GDP) in the Canary Islands in 2015 was €40,923 million, €19,222 per capita. The figures by island are as follows:

GDP by island in million euros
Island	GDP
Tenerife	17,615
Gran Canaria	15,812
Lanzarote	3,203
Fuerteventura	2,298
La Palma	1,423
La Gomera	394
El Hierro	178

== Transport ==
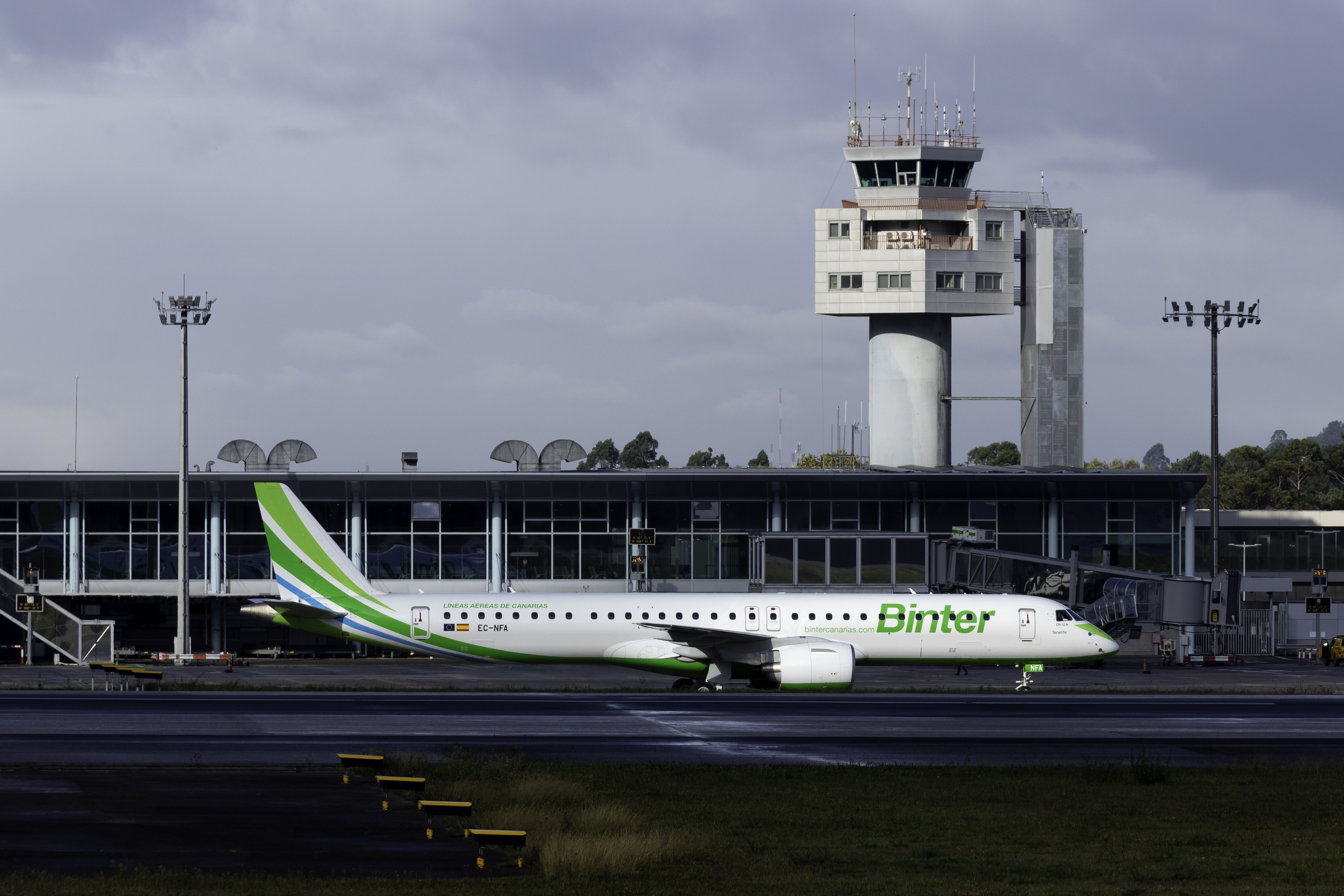
A Binter Canarias Embraer 195 E2 at the Galician airport of Vigo. Binter is the biggest airline of the Canary Islands and labels itself as the flag carrier of the Autonomous Community (Líneas Aéreas de Canarias).

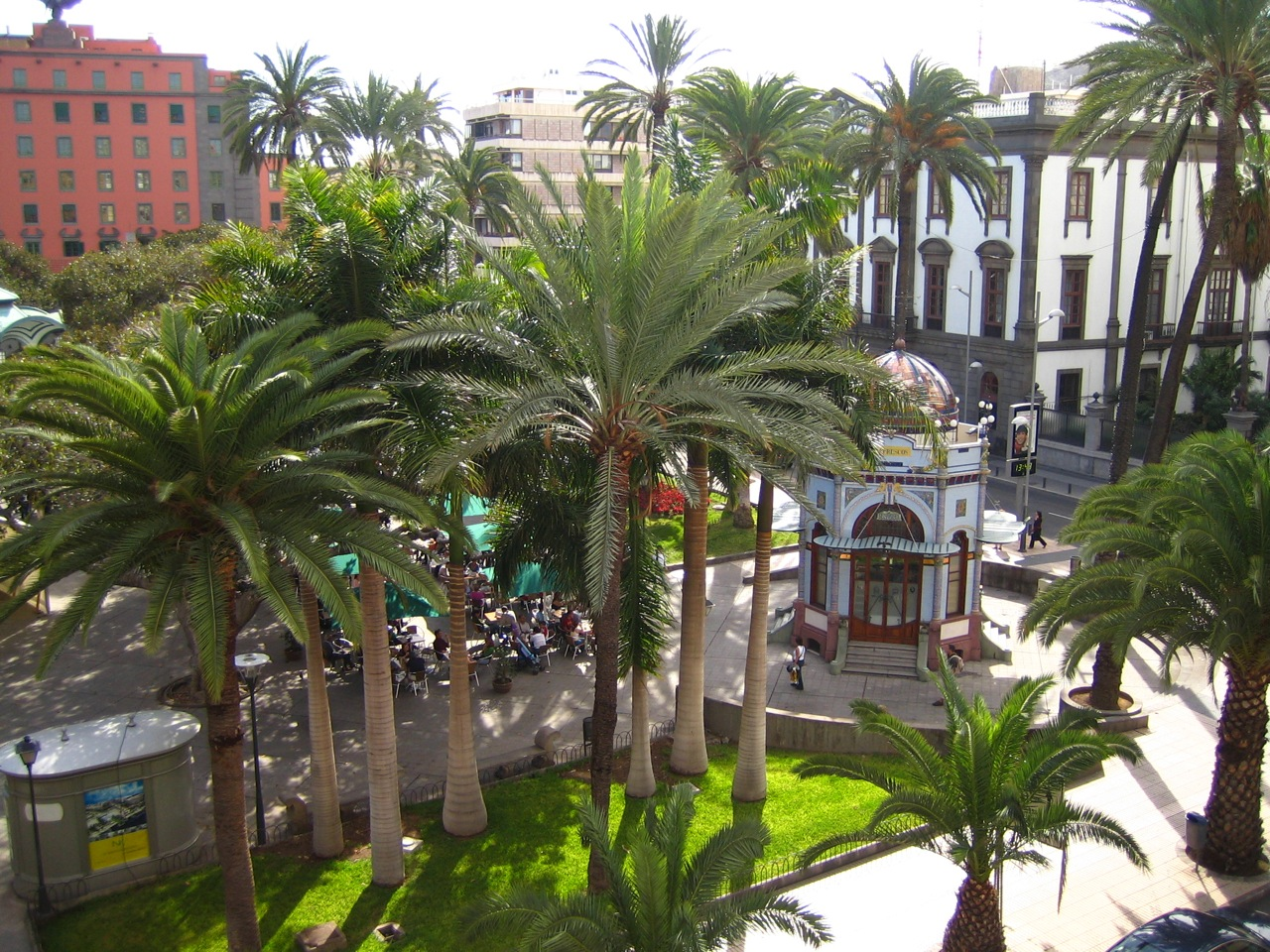
Bus Station—Estación de Guaguas also known as El Hoyo (The hole), on the left, out of the image—at San Telmo Park, Las Palmas de Gran Canaria

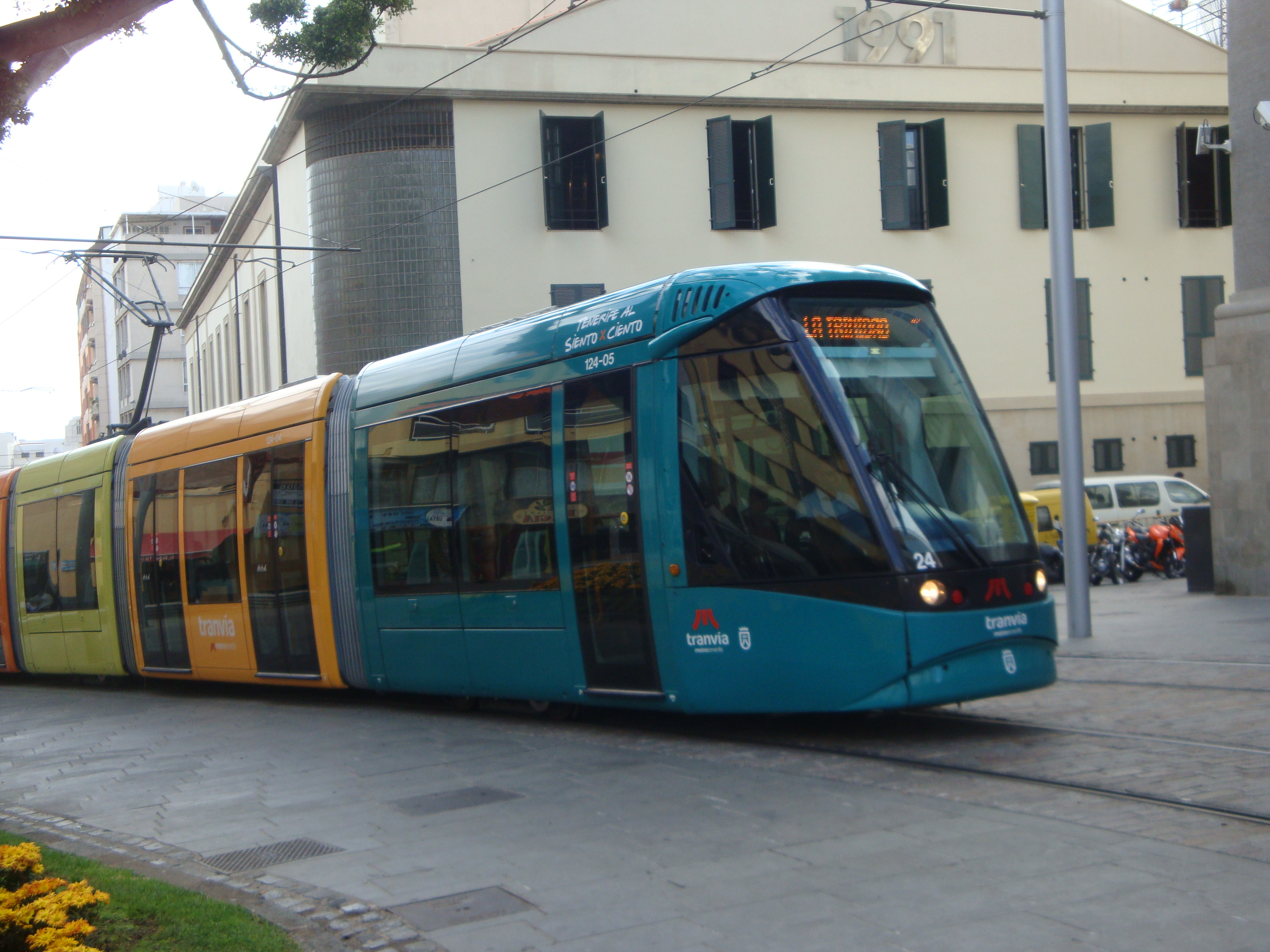
Tenerife Tram, is the only existing tramway or train in the Canary Islands

The Canary Islands have eight airports altogether, two of the main ports of Spain, and an extensive network of autopistas (highways) and other roads. For a road map see multimap. Traffic congestion is sometimes a problem in Tenerife and on Gran Canaria.

Large ferry boats and fast ferries link most of the islands. Both types can transport large numbers of passengers, cargo, and vehicles. Fast ferries are made of aluminium and powered by modern and efficient diesel engines, while conventional ferries have a steel hull and are powered by heavy oil. Fast ferries travel in excess of 30 kn (56 km/h; 35 mph); conventional ferries travel in excess of 20 kn (37 km/h; 23 mph), but are slower than fast ferries. A typical ferry ride between La Palma and Tenerife may take up to eight hours or more while a fast ferry takes about two and a half hours and between Tenerife and Gran Canaria can be about one hour.

The largest airport is the Gran Canaria Airport. Tenerife has two airports, Tenerife North Airport and Tenerife South Airport. The island of Tenerife gathers the highest passenger movement of all the Canary Islands through its two airports. The two main islands (Tenerife and Gran Canaria) receive the greatest number of passengers. Tenerife 6,204,499 passengers and Gran Canaria 5,011,176 passengers.

The port of Las Palmas is first in freight traffic in the islands, while the port of Santa Cruz de Tenerife is the first fishing port with approximately 7,500 tons of fish caught, according to the Spanish government publication Statistical Yearbook of State Ports. Similarly, it is the second port in Spain as regards ship traffic, only surpassed by the Port of Algeciras Bay. The port's facilities include a border inspection post (BIP) approved by the European Union, which is responsible for inspecting all types of imports from third countries or exports to countries outside the European Economic Area. The port of Los Cristianos (Tenerife) has the greatest number of passengers recorded in the Canary Islands, followed by the port of Santa Cruz de Tenerife. The Port of Las Palmas is the third port in the islands in passengers and first in number of vehicles transported.

The SS America was beached at the Canary islands on 18 January 1994. However, the ocean liner broke apart after the course of several years and eventually sank beneath the surface.

=== Rail transport ===
The Tenerife Tram opened in 2007 and is currently the only one in the Canary Islands, travelling between the cities of Santa Cruz de Tenerife and San Cristóbal de La Laguna.

Three more railway lines are being planned for the Canary Islands:

Line	Island	Terminus A	Terminus B
Tren de Gran Canaria	Gran Canaria	Las Palmas de Gran Canaria	Maspalomas
Tren del Sur	Tenerife	Santa Cruz de Tenerife	Los Cristianos
Tren del Norte	Tenerife	Santa Cruz de Tenerife	Los Realejos

=== Airports ===
- Tenerife South Airport – Tenerife
- Tenerife North Airport – Tenerife
- César Manrique-Lanzarote Airport – Lanzarote
- Fuerteventura Airport – Fuerteventura
- Gran Canaria Airport – Gran Canaria
- La Palma Airport – La Palma
- La Gomera Airport – La Gomera
- El Hierro Airport – El Hierro

=== Ports ===
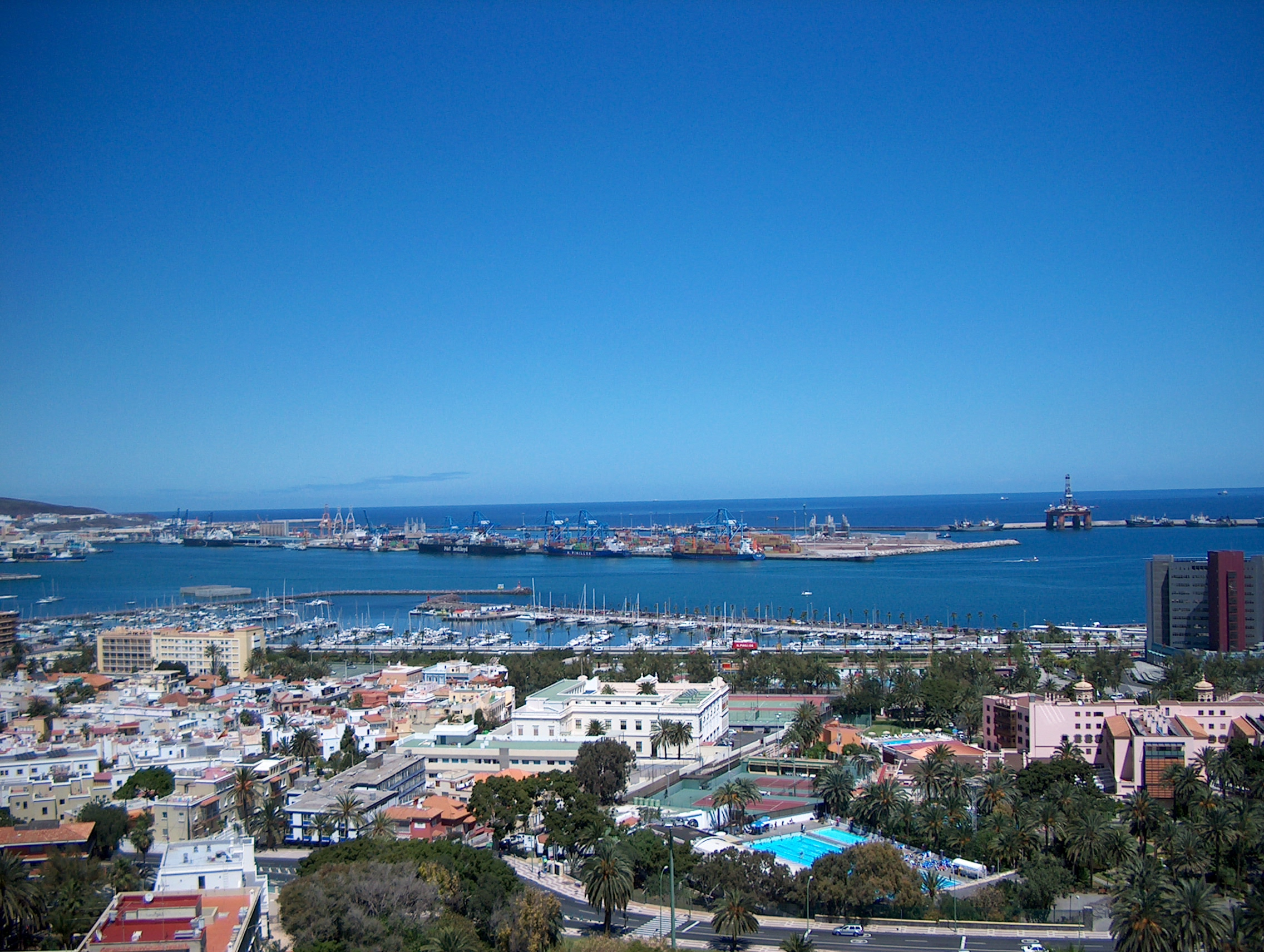
Port of Las Palmas, the largest port in the Canary Islands

- Port of Puerto del Rosario – Fuerteventura
- Port of Arrecife – Lanzarote
- Port of Playa Blanca—Lanzarote
- Port of Santa Cruz de La Palma – La Palma
- Port of San Sebastián de La Gomera – La Gomera
- Port of La Estaca – El Hierro
- Port of Las Palmas – Gran Canaria
- Port of Arinaga – Gran Canaria
- Port of Agaete – Gran Canaria
- Port of Los Cristianos – Tenerife
- Port of Santa Cruz de Tenerife – Tenerife
- Port of Garachico – Tenerife
- Port of Granadilla – Tenerife

== Health ==
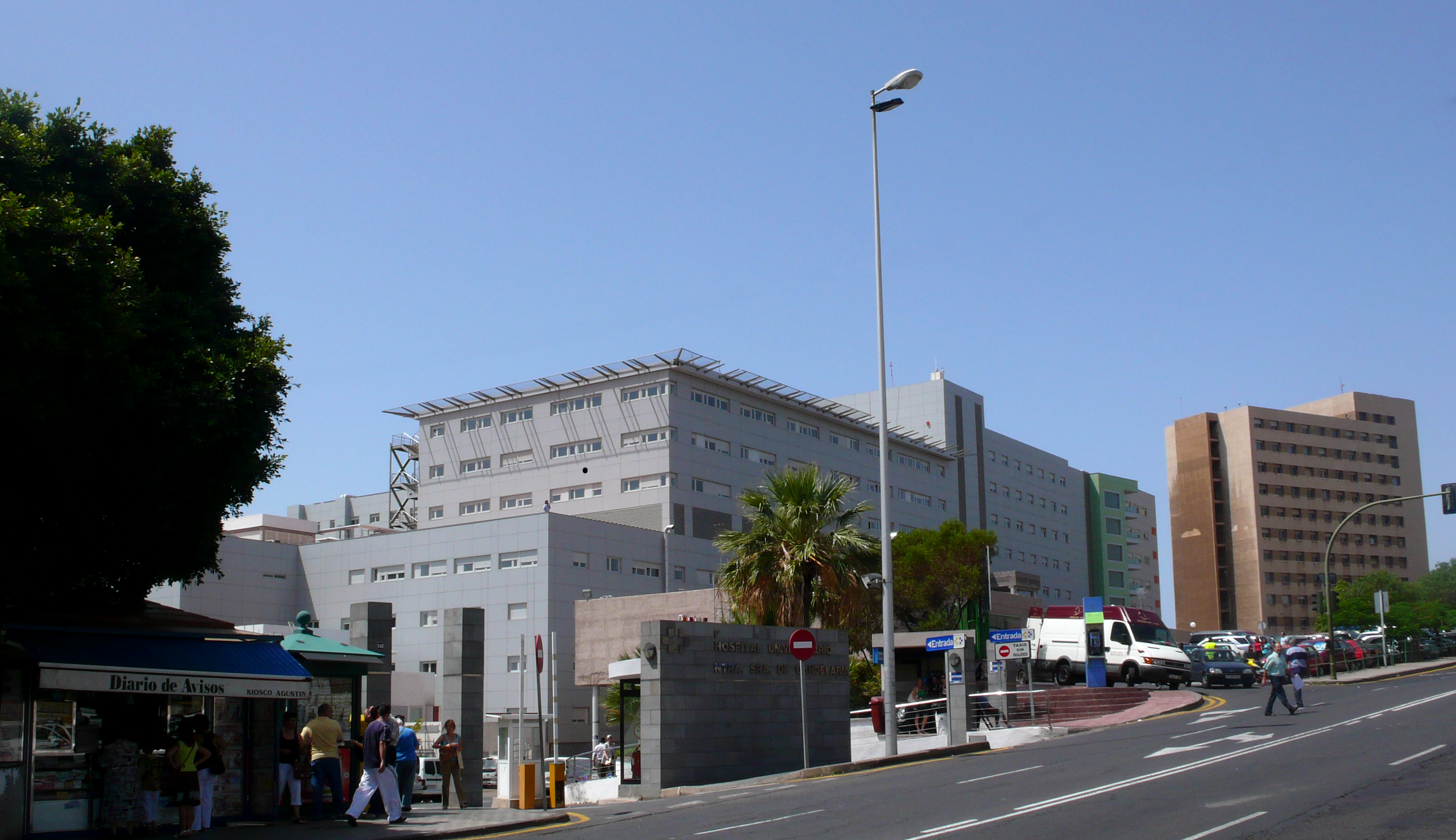
Hospital Universitario Nuestra Señora de Candelaria, Tenerife. It is the largest hospital complex in the Canary Islands.

The Servicio Canario de Salud is an autonomous body of administrative nature attached to the Ministry responsible for Health of the Government of the Canary Islands.

- Hospital Nuestra Señora de los Reyes – El Hierro
- Hospital General de La Palma – La Palma
- Hospital Nuestra Señora de Guadalupe – La Gomera
- Hospital Universitario Nuestra Señora de Candelaria – Tenerife
- Hospital Universitario de Canarias – Tenerife
- Hospital del Sur de Tenerife – Tenerife
- Hospital del Norte de Tenerife – Tenerife
- Hospital Universitario de Gran Canaria Doctor Negrín – Gran Canaria
- Hospital Universitario Insular de Gran Canaria – Gran Canaria
- Hospital General de Lanzarote Doctor José Molina Orosa – Lanzarote
- Hospital General de Fuerteventura – Fuerteventura

== Science and technology ==
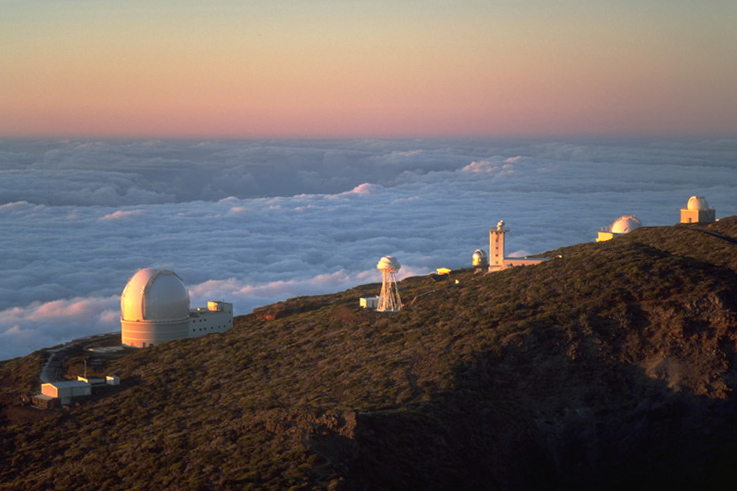
Roque de los Muchachos Observatory, La Palma

In the 1960s, Gran Canaria was selected as the location for one of the 14 ground stations in the Manned Space Flight Network (MSFN) to support the NASA space program. Maspalomas Station, located in the south of the island, took part in a number of space missions including the Apollo 11 Moon landings and Skylab. Today it continues to support satellite communications as part of the ESA network.

Because of the remote location, a number of astronomical observatories are located in the archipelago, including the Teide Observatory on Tenerife, the Roque de los Muchachos Observatory on La Palma, and the Temisas Astronomical Observatory on Gran Canaria.

Tenerife is the home of the Instituto de Astrofísica de Canarias (Astrophysical Institute of the Canaries). There is also an Instituto de Bio-Orgánica Antonio González (Antonio González Bio-Organic Institute) at the University of La Laguna. Also at that university are the Instituto de Lingüística Andrés Bello (Andrés Bello Institute of Linguistics), the Centro de Estudios Medievales y Renacentistas (Center for Medieval and Renaissance Studies), the Instituto Universitario de la Empresa (University Institute of Business), the Instituto de Derecho Regional (Regional Institute of Law), the Instituto Universitario de Ciencias Políticas y Sociales (University Institute of Political and Social Sciences) and the Instituto de Enfermedades Tropicales (Institute of Tropical Diseases). The latter is one of the seven institutions of the Red de Investigación de Centros de Enfermedades Tropicales (RICET, "Network of Research of Centers of Tropical Diseases"), located in various parts of Spain. The Instituto Volcanológico de Canarias (Volcanological Institute of the Canary Islands) is based in Tenerife.

== Sports ==
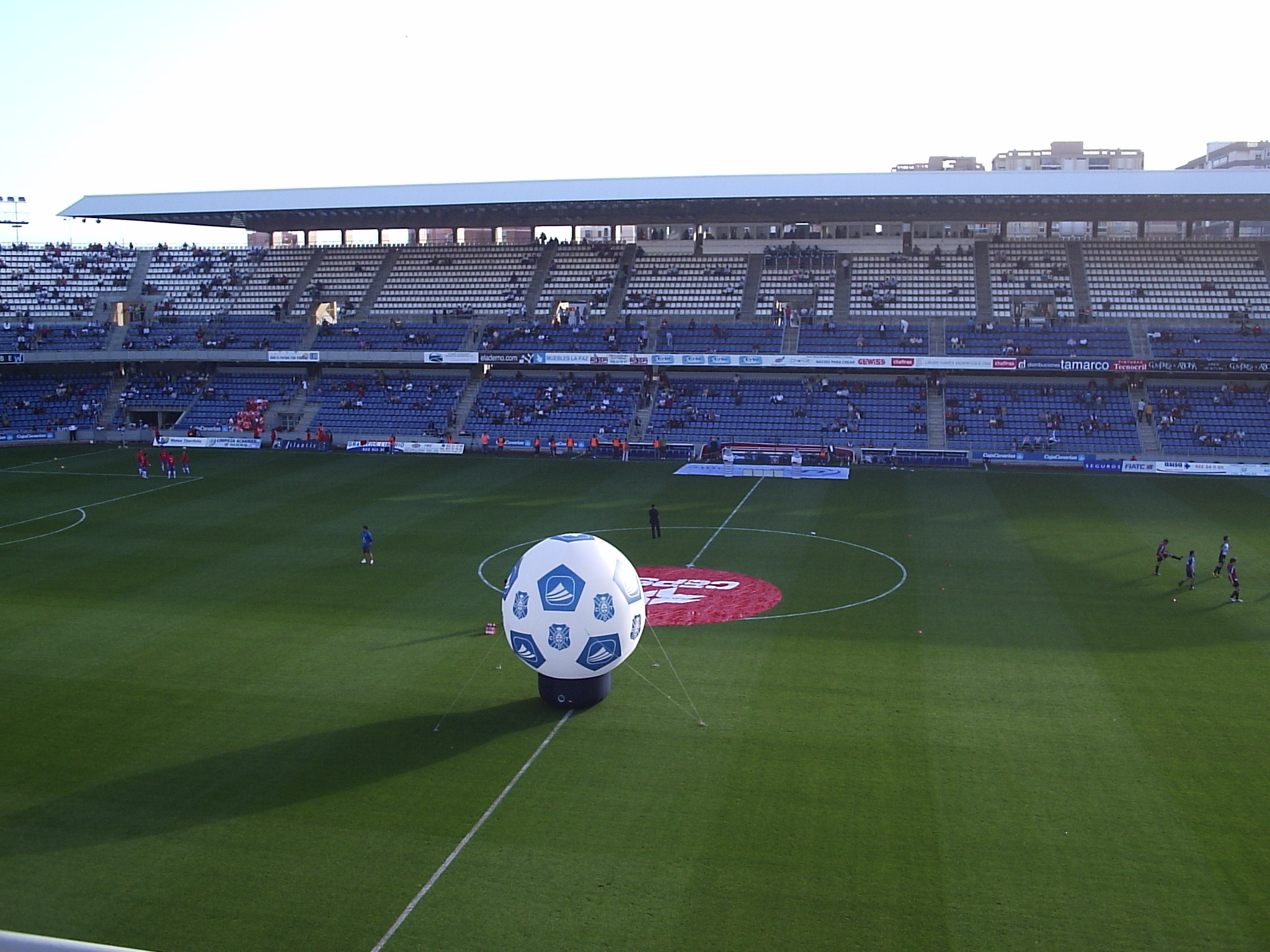
Heliodoro Rodríguez López Stadium in Tenerife, the stadium with the largest field area in the Canary Islands

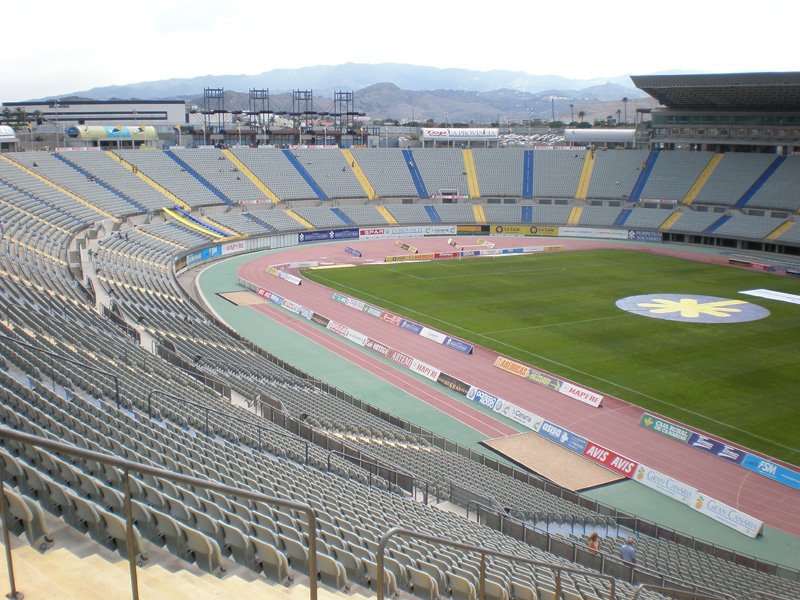
Gran Canaria Stadium, the biggest sports venue in the Canary Islands

A unique form of wrestling known as Canarian wrestling (lucha canaria) has opponents stand in a special area called a "terrero" and try to throw each other to the ground using strength and quick movements.

Another sport is the "game of the sticks" (palo canario) where opponents fence with long sticks. This may have come about from the shepherds of the islands who would challenge each other using their long walking sticks.

Furthermore, there is the shepherd's jump (salto del pastor). This involves using a long stick to vault over an open area. This sport possibly evolved from the shepherd's need to occasionally get over an open area in the hills as they were tending their sheep.

The two main football teams in the archipelago are: the CD Tenerife (founded in 1912) and UD Las Palmas (founded in 1949). As of the 2025/2026 season, UD Las Palmas plays in the Segunda División, the second tier of Spanish football. CD Tenerife however plays in The Primera Federación. When in the same division, the clubs contest the Canary Islands derby. There are smaller clubs also playing in the mainland Spanish football league system, most notably UD Lanzarote and CD Laguna, although no other Canarian clubs have played in the top flight.

The mountainous terrain of the Canary Islands also caters to the growing popularity of ultra running and ultramarathons as host of annual competitive long-distance events including CajaMar Tenerife Bluetrail on Tenerife, Transvulcania on La Palma, Transgrancanaria on Gran Canaria, and the Half Marathon des Sables on Fuerteventura. A yearly Ironman Triathlon has been taking place on Lanzarote since 1992.

=== Notable athletes ===
- Paco Campos, (1916–1995); a footballer who played as a forward. With 127 goals, 120 of which were for Atlético Madrid, he is the highest scoring player from the Canary Islands in La Liga.
- Nicolás García Hemme, born 20 June 1988 in Las Palmas de Gran Canaria, Canary Islands, 2012 London Olympics, Taekwondo Silver Medalist in Men's Welterweight category (−80 kg).
- Alfredo Cabrera, (1881–1964); shortstop for the St. Louis Cardinals in 1913
- Sergio Rodríguez, born in San Cristóbal de La Laguna in 1986, played point guard for the Portland Trail Blazers, Sacramento Kings, and New York Knicks.
- David Silva, born in Arguineguín in 1986, plays association football for Real Sociedad, member of the 2010 FIFA World Cup champion Spain national football team
- Juan Carlos Valerón, born in Arguineguín in 1975, played association football for Deportivo la Coruna and Las Palmas.
- Pedro, born in Santa Cruz de Tenerife in 1987, plays association football for Lazio, member of the 2010 FIFA World Cup champion Spain national football team
- Carla Suárez Navarro, born in Las Palmas de Gran Canaria in 1988, professional tennis player
- Paola Tirados, born in Las Palmas de Gran Canaria in 1980, synchronised swimmer, who participated in the Olympic Games of 2000, 2004 and 2008. She won the silver medal in Beijing in 2008 in the team competition category.
- Jesé, born in Las Palmas de Gran Canaria in 1993, plays association football for Las Palmas.
- Christo Bezuidenhout, born in Tenerife in 1970, played rugby union for Gloucester and South Africa.
- Pedri, born in Tegueste in 2002, plays association football for Barcelona.
- Misa Rodríguez, born in Las Palmas de Gran Canaria in 1999, plays association football for Real Madrid Femenino. Member of the 2023 Women's World Cup winning Spain women's national football team.
- Nico Paz, born in Santa Cruz de Tenerife in 2004, plays association football for Como.

== See also ==
=== History ===
- Battle of Santa Cruz de Tenerife (1797)
- First Battle of Acentejo
- Pyramids of Güímar
- Second Battle of Acentejo
- Tanausu
- Tenerife airport disaster; the deadliest commercial aviation disaster in history.

=== Geography ===
- Cumbre Vieja, a volcano on La Palma
- Guatiza (Lanzarote)
- La Matanza de Acentejo
- Los Llanos de Aridane
- Orotava Valley
- San Andrés
- Islands of Macaronesia
  - Azores
  - Madeira
  - Cabo Verde

=== Culture ===
- Canarian cuisine
- Canarian Spanish
- Religion in Canary Islands
- Isleños
- Military of the Canary Islands
- Music of the Canary Islands
- Silbo Gomero, a whistled language, is an indigenous variant of Spanish
- Tortilla canaria
- Virgin of Candelaria (Patron saint of Canary Islands)

== Sources ==
- Alfred Crosby, Ecological Imperialism: The Biological Expansion of Europe, 900–1900 (Cambridge University Press) ISBN 0-521-45690-8
- Felipe Fernández-Armesto, The Canary Islands after the Conquest: The Making of a Colonial Society in the Early-Sixteenth Century, Oxford U. Press, 1982. ISBN 978-0-19-821888-3; ISBN 0-19-821888-5
- Sergio Hanquet, Diving in Canaries, Litografía A. ROMERO, 2001. ISBN 84-932195-0-9
- Martin Wiemers: The butterflies of the Canary Islands. – A survey on their distribution, biology and ecology (Lepidoptera: Papilionoidea and Hesperioidea) – Linneana Belgica 15 (1995): 63–84 & 87–118
