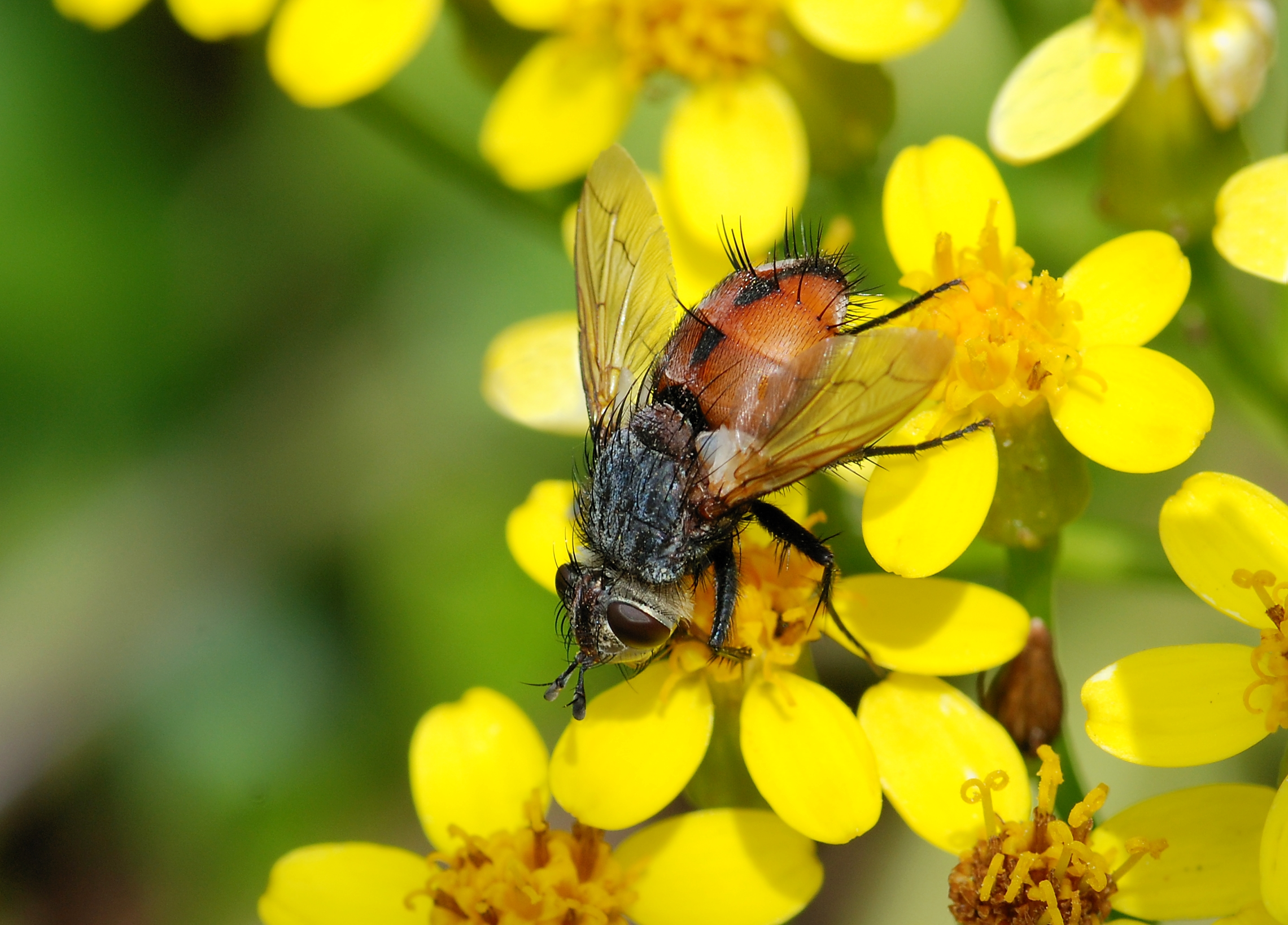
- Tachina praeceps

Scientific classification
- Kingdom: Animalia
- Phylum: Arthropoda
- Clade: Pancrustacea
- Class: Insecta
- Order: Diptera
- Family: Tachinidae
- Subfamily: Tachininae
- Tribe: Tachinini
- Genus: Tachina; Meigen, 1803

Type species
- Musca grossa Linnaeus, 1758

Subgenera
- Eudoromyia Bezzi, 1906; Servillia Robineau-Desvoidy, 1830; Tachina

Synonyms
- Echinomya Duméril, 1804; Echinomyia Latreille, 1809; Larvaevora Meigen, 1800; Fabriciella Bezzi, 1906

= Tachina =

Genus of flies

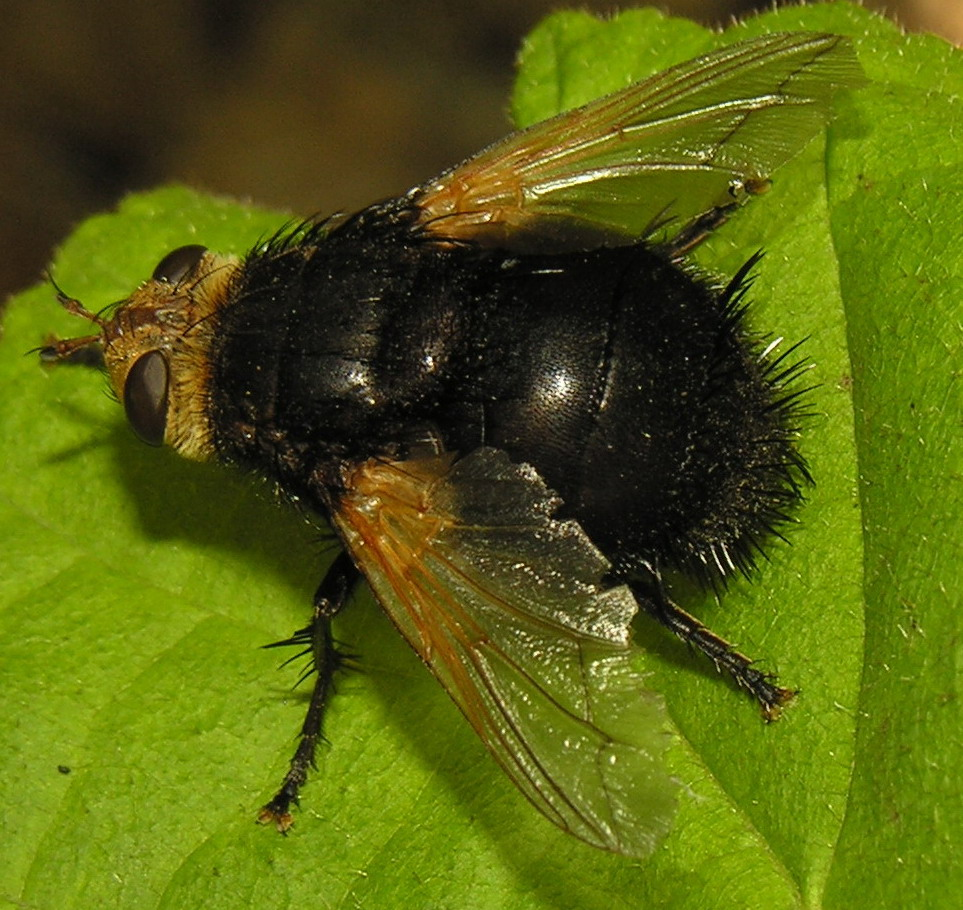
Tachina grossa

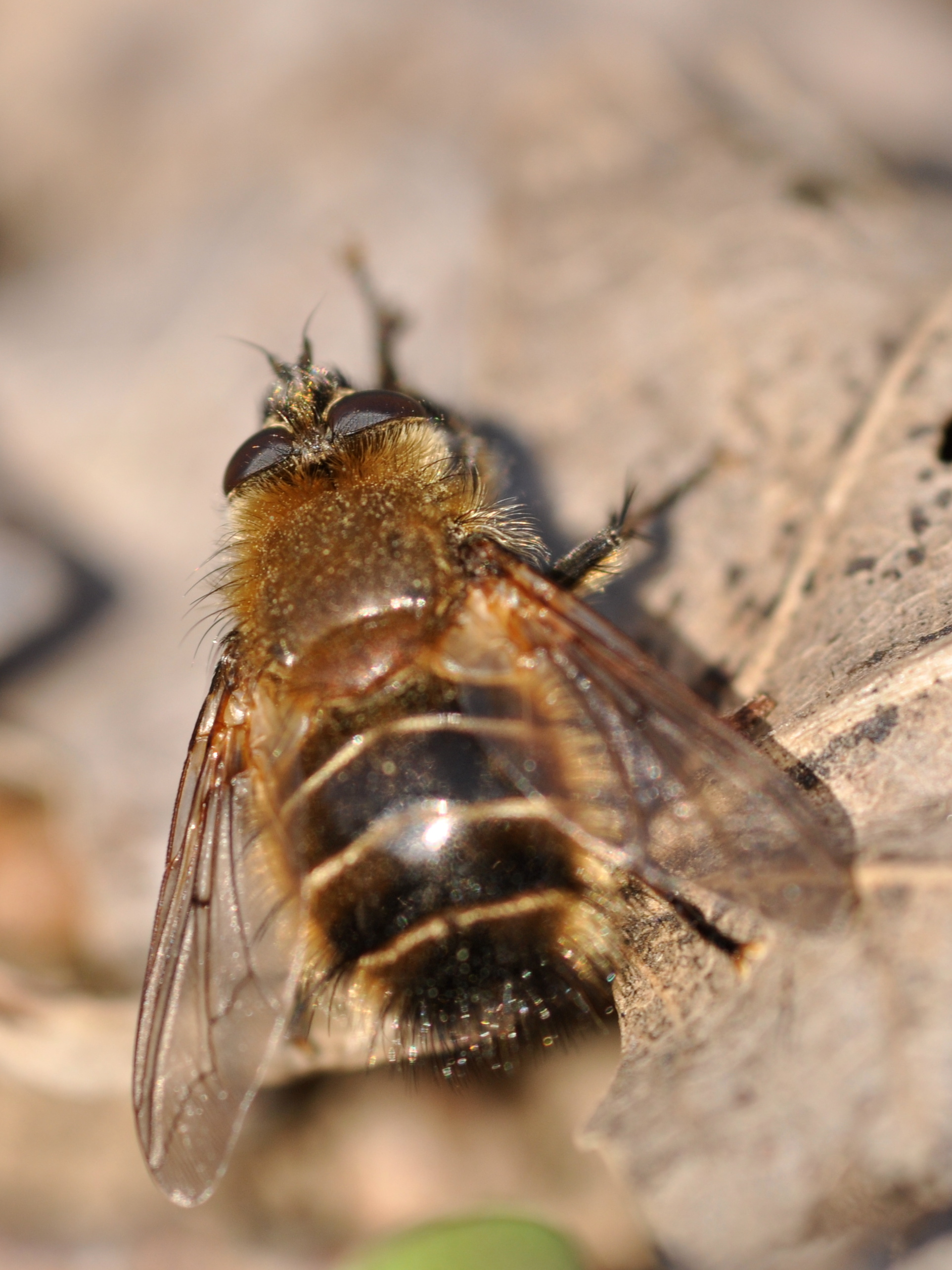
Tachina ursina

Tachina is a genus of large flies in the family Tachinidae. There are approximately 600 species worldwide. Most have larvae that are parasitoids of lepidopteran caterpillars.

== Taxonomy ==
Nowickia Wachtl, 1894, treated by some authors as a subgenus of Tachina Meigen, 1803, following most authors is now accepted as a valid genus and treated separately.

== Species ==
Species within this genus include:

- Tachina actinosa (Reinhard, 1938)
- Tachina acuminata (Tothill, 1924)
- Tachina agnita Meigen, 1838
- Tachina alacer Macquart, 1854
- Tachina albidopilosa (Portschinsky, 1882)
- Tachina albifrons (Walker, 1836)
- Tachina algens Wiedemann, 1830
- Tachina alticola (Malloch, 1932)
- Tachina amasia Meigen, 1838
- Tachina amica Waltl, 1837
- Tachina amurensis (Zimin, 1929)
- Tachina anguisipennis (Chao, 1987)
- Tachina angulata (Meijere, 1924)
- Tachina angusta Macquart, 1854
- Tachina antennata (Walker, 1853)
- Tachina apicalis (Chao, 1962)
- Tachina ardens (Zimin, 1929)
- Tachina arvensis Robineau-Desvoidy, 1830
- Tachina asiatica (Tothill, 1918)
- Tachina astytos Walker, 1849
- Tachina atra (Malloch, 1932)
- Tachina augens Walker, 1853
- Tachina aurulenta (Chao, 1987)
- Tachina barbata Zimin, 1984
- Tachina basalis (Zimin, 1929)
- Tachina bicolor Macquart, 1835
- Tachina bijuncta Walker, 1853
- Tachina bipartita Macquart, 1834
- Tachina bombidiforma (Chao, 1987)
- Tachina bombylia (Villeneuve, 1936)
- Tachina breviala (Chao, 1987)
- Tachina breviceps (Zimin, 1929)
- Tachina brevicornis Macquart, 1854
- Tachina brevipalpis (Chao & Zhou, 1993)
- Tachina brevirostris (Tothill, 1924)
- Tachina breviventris (Wiedemann, 1830)
- Tachina brunneri (Loew, 1873)
- Tachina brunnipalpis Macquart, 1834
- Tachina californimyia Arnaud, 1992
- Tachina calliphon (Walker, 1849)
- Tachina canadensis (Tothill, 1924)
- Tachina candens (Walker, 1849)
- Tachina casta (Rondani, 1859)
- Tachina celer Macquart, 1854
- Tachina chaetaria Zimin, 1980
- Tachina chaoi Mesnil, 1966
- Tachina cheni (Chao, 1987)
- Tachina chrysocephala (Walker, 1836)
- Tachina chrysotelus (Walker, 1853)
- Tachina cincta (Walker, 1853)
- Tachina comitata Walker, 1853
- Tachina compressa (Tothill, 1924)
- Tachina confecta Walker, 1853
- Tachina conjuncta Walker, 1853
- Tachina contracta Walker, 1853
- Tachina cordiforceps (Rowe, 1931)
- Tachina corsicana (Villeneuve, 1931)
- Tachina corylana Gimmerthal, 1834
- Tachina defecta Walker, 1853
- Tachina demissa Walker, 1853
- Tachina derracm Walker, 1853
- Tachina despicienda (Walker, 1861)
- Tachina diaphana (Fabricius, 1805)
- Tachina discifera (Walker, 1860)
- Tachina dispartita Walker, 1853
- Tachina dispecia Walker, 1853
- Tachina dispuncta Walker, 1853
- Tachina distenta Walker, 1853
- Tachina diversa Waltl, 1837
- Tachina divulsa Walker, 1853
- Tachina domator Walker, 1853
- Tachina dorycus Walker, 1849
- Tachina effecta Walker, 1853
- Tachina egula (Reinhard, 1938)
- Tachina emarginata (Tothill, 1924)
- Tachina enodata Walker, 1853
- Tachina enotata Walker, 1853
- Tachina enussa Walker, 1853
- Tachina erecta Walker, 1853
- Tachina erogara Walker, 1853
- Tachina erratica Meigen, 1838
- Tachina errors (Robineau-Desvoidy, 1830)
- Tachina erucarum Schrank, 1803
- Tachina eurekana (Reinhard, 1942)
- Tachina evanida (Reinhard, 1953)
- Tachina evocata Walker, 1853
- Tachina evoluta Walker, 1853
- Tachina ewdens Walker, 1853
- Tachina exacta Walker, 1853
- Tachina exagens Walker, 1853
- Tachina exclusa Walker, 1853
- Tachina excoriata (Wiedemann, 1830)
- Tachina exilistyla Macquart, 1835
- Tachina expleta Walker, 1853
- Tachina fallax Meigen, 1824
- Tachina fera (Linnaeus, 1761)
- Tachina ferina Meigen, 1830
- Tachina fesfiva Meigen, 1824
- Tachina fischeri Gimmerthal, 1834
- Tachina fissa Walker, 1853
- Tachina flavicalyptrata Macquart, 1854
- Tachina flaviceps Macquart, 1854
- Tachina flavifrons Macquart, 1854
- Tachina flavipes (Chao, 1962)
- Tachina flavopilosa (Bigot, 1888)
- Tachina flavosquama Chao, 1982
- Tachina flexa Walker, 1853
- Tachina florum Walker, 1849
- Tachina furcipennis (Chao & Zhou, 1987)
- Tachina garretti Arnaud, 1994
- Tachina genurufa (Villeneuve, 1936)
- Tachina gibbiforceps (Chao, 1962)
- Tachina gimmerthali Gimmerthal, 1834
- Tachina glabrata Meigen, 1824
- Tachina griseicollis Meigen, 1824
- Tachina griseifrons Zimin, 1984
- Tachina grisescens Meigen, 1838
- Tachina grossa (Linnaeus, 1758)
- Tachina haemorrhoa (Mesnil, 1953)
- Tachina hirta Macquart, 1834
- Tachina hispida (Tothill, 1924)
- Tachina hortensis Meigen, 1838
- Tachina idiotica Meigen, 1824
- Tachina imbuta (Walker, 1853)
- Tachina incisa Macquart, 1834
- Tachina infestans Walker, 1853
- Tachina inflexicornis Macquart, 1854
- Tachina innovata (Walker, 1861)
- Tachina inoperta Walker, 1853
- Tachina inquilina Walker, 1853
- Tachina insedata Walker, 1853
- Tachina instigata Meigen, 1835
- Tachina intacta Walker, 1853
- Tachina intaminata Walker, 1853
- Tachina intercedens Walker, 1853
- Tachina interclusa Walker, 1853
- Tachina intermedia (Reinhard, 1942)
- Tachina intermixta' Walker, 1853
- Tachina interna Walker, 1853
- Tachina interrupta (Robineau-Desvoidy, 1863)
- Tachina intracta Walker, 1853
- Tachina intricata Meigen, 1830
- Tachina inumbrata Meigen, 1838
- Tachina invelata (Reinhard, 1953)
- Tachina involuta Walker, 1853
- Tachina iota Chao & Arnaud, 1993
- Tachina isea (Walker, 1849)
- Tachina jacobsoni (Townsend, 1926)
- Tachina jakovlewii (Portschinsky, 1882)
- Tachina javana Malloch, 1932
- Tachina jawensis Chao & Arnaud, 1993
- Tachina kolomietzi Zimin, 1967
- Tachina kunmingensis Chao & Arnaud, 1993
- Tachina laeta Robineau-Desvoidy, 1830
- Tachina laterolinea (Chao, 1962)
- Tachina lateromaculata (Chao, 1962)
- Tachina latianulum (Tothill, 1924)
- Tachina latifacies (Tothill, 1924)
- Tachina latiforceps (Tothill, 1924)
- Tachina latifrons (Tothill, 1924)
- Tachina latigena (Tothill, 1924)
- Tachina levicula Macquart, 1854
- Tachina lindemanni Gimmerthal, 1834
- Tachina longiunguis (Tothill, 1924)
- Tachina longiventris (Chao, 1962)
- Tachina ludibunda Macquart, 1854
- Tachina lueola (Coquillett, 1898)
- Tachina lurida (Fabricius, 1781)
- Tachina luteisquama Zimin, 1984
- Tachina macropuchia Chao, 1982
- Tachina macropuchia Chao, 1982
- Tachina macularia Wiedemann, 1824
- Tachina magica Meigen, 1824
- Tachina magna (Giglio-Tos, 1890)
- Tachina magnicornis (Zetterstedt, 1844)
- Tachina majae (Zimin, 1935)
- Tachina mallochi Chao & Arnaud, 1993
- Tachina margella (Reinhard, 1942)
- Tachina marginella (Reinhard, 1942)
- Tachina medogensis (Chao & Zhou, 1988)
- Tachina melaleuca Meigen, 1824
- Tachina metallica Brullé, 1833
- Tachina minor (Suster, 1953)
- Tachina minuta (Chao, 1962)
- Tachina montana (Townsend, 1916)
- Tachina morosa Meigen, 1824
- Tachina multans Walker, 1853
- Tachina nearctica Arnaud, 1992
- Tachina nectarea Meigen, 1824
- Tachina nicaeana (Robineau-Desvoidy, 1863)
- Tachina nigella (Reinhard, 1938)
- Tachina nigrifera (Walker, 1853)
- Tachina nigrocastanea Chao, 1962
- Tachina nigrolineata Stephens, 1829
- Tachina nitida (Wulp, 1882)
- Tachina nivalis (Tothill, 1924)
- Tachina nupta (Rondani, 1859)
- Tachina objecta Walker, 1853
- Tachina occidentalis (Wiedemann, 1830)
- Tachina oligoria Arnaud, 1992
- Tachina orbitalis (Reinhard, 1942)
- Tachina pagana Meigen, 1838
- Tachina pallipalpis Macquart, 1834
- Tachina palpalis (Coquillett, 1902)
- Tachina particeps Walker, 1853
- Tachina persica (Portschinsky, 1873)
- Tachina pertinens Walker, 1853
- Tachina picea (Robineau-Desvoidy, 1830)
- Tachina piceifrons (Townsend, 1916)
- Tachina pictilis (Reinhard, 1942)
- Tachina pilosa (Tothill, 1924)
- Tachina pingbian Chao & Arnaud, 1993
- Tachina planiforceps (Tothill, 1924)
- Tachina planiventris (Macquart, 1851)
- Tachina plumasana (Reinhard, 1953)
- Tachina plumbea Stephens, 1829
- Tachina politula (Coquillett, 1898)
- Tachina polychaeta Egger, 1861
- Tachina potens (Robineau-Desvoidy, 1863)
- Tachina praeceps (Meigen, 1824)
- Tachina pubiventris Chao, 1962
- Tachina pubiventris (Chao, 1962)
- Tachina pudibunda Gimmerthal, 1829
- Tachina pulvera (Chao, 1962)
- Tachina pulverea (Chao, 1962)
- Tachina pulvillata Belanovsky, 1953
- Tachina pumila Macquart, 1854
- Tachina punctocincta (Villeneuve, 1936)
- Tachina pusilla Macquart, 1834
- Tachina pygmaea Macquart, 1834
- Tachina qingzangensis (Chao, 1982)
- Tachina quadricincia Stephens, 1829
- Tachina quadrimaculata Macquart, 1835
- Tachina quadrinotata Meigen, 1824
- Tachina quadrivittata Zimin, 1984
- Tachina reclusa Walker, 1853
- Tachina rectinervis Macquart, 1854
- Tachina refecta Walker, 1853
- Tachina robinsoni (Townsend, 1915)
- Tachina rohdendorfi Zimin, 1935
- Tachina rohdendorfiana Chao & Arnaud, 1993
- Tachina rondanii (Giglio-Tos, 1890)
- Tachina rostrata (Tothill, 1924)
- Tachina rubricornis Zetterstedt, 1844
- Tachina ruficauda (Chao, 1987)
- Tachina ruficornis (Robineau-Desvoidy, 1830)
- Tachina rufifrons Macquart, 1854
- Tachina rufiventris Suster, 1929
- Tachina rufoanalis (Macquart, 1851)
- Tachina rustica Robineau-Desvoidy, 1830
- Tachina sacontala Walker, 1849
- Tachina saltatrix (Wiedemann, 1830)
- Tachina scita (Walker, 1853)
- Tachina senoptera Macquart, 1834
- Tachina sibirica Kolomiets, 1984
- Tachina silvestris Robineau-Desvoidy, 1830
- Tachina sinerea Chao, 1962
- Tachina sobria Walker, 1853
- Tachina soror Robineau-Desvoidy, 1830
- Tachina sosilus (Walker, 1849)
- Tachina spina Chao, 1987
- Tachina spina (Chao, 1987)
- Tachina spineiventer (Tothill, 1924)
- Tachina spinipennis (Wiedemann, 1830)
- Tachina spinosa (Tothill, 1924)
- Tachina stackelbergi (Zimin, 1929)
- Tachina stackelbergiana Herting, 1993
- Tachina strenua (Robineau-Desvoidy, 1863)
- Tachina stupida Herting, 1993
- Tachina subcinerea Walker, 1853
- Tachina subfasciata Meigen, 1838
- Tachina subpilosa (Robineau-Desvoidy, 1830)
- Tachina subvaria (Walker, 1853)
- Tachina sumatrensis (Townsend, 1926)
- Tachina tadzhica Zimin, 1980
- Tachina taenionota Meigen, 1830
- Tachina tahoensis (Reinhard, 1938)
- Tachina tenebrifera (Walker, 1853)
- Tachina tephra Meigen, 1824
- Tachina terminalis Meigen, 1824
- Tachina testacea (Robineau-Desvoidy, 1830)
- Tachina testaceifrons Roser, 1840
- Tachina testaceipes Stephens, 1829
- Tachina tienmushan Chao & Arnaud, 1993
- Tachina trianguli (Walker, 1849)
- Tachina tricincta Meigen, 1824
- Tachina tricolor (Lichtwardt, 1909)
- Tachina trifasciata (Walker, 1836)
- Tachina trigonophora Zimin, 1980
- Tachina trimaculata Meigen, 1824
- Tachina turanica Zimin, 1980
- Tachina ursina (Meigen, 1824)
- Tachina ursinoidea (Tothill, 1918)
- Tachina vallata (Meigen, 1838)
- Tachina venosa Meigen, 1824
- Tachina ventralis (Wiedemann, 1824)
- Tachina vernalis (Robineau-Desvoidy, 1830)
- Tachina vicina Robineau-Desvoidy, 1830
- Tachina victoria (Townsend, 1897)
- Tachina virginea Meigen, 1838
- Tachina viridulans Walker, 1853
- Tachina vittata (Walker, 1853)
- Tachina vulgata (Walker, 1853)
- Tachina xizangensis (Chao, 1982)
- Tachina zaqu Chao & Arnaud, 1993
- Tachina zimini (Chao, 1962)
