= Tachina actinosa =

Scientific classification
- Kingdom: Animalia
- Phylum: Arthropoda
- Class: Insecta
- Order: Diptera
- Family: Tachinidae
- Genus: Tachina
- Subgenus: Nowickia
- Species: T. actinosa

Binomial name
- Tachina actinosa (Reinhard, 1938)

Synonyms
- Fabriciella actinosa Reinhard, 1938

Species of fly

Tachina actinosa is a species of fly in the family Tachinidae. It is endemic to the United States with records from Colorado and Oregon.
