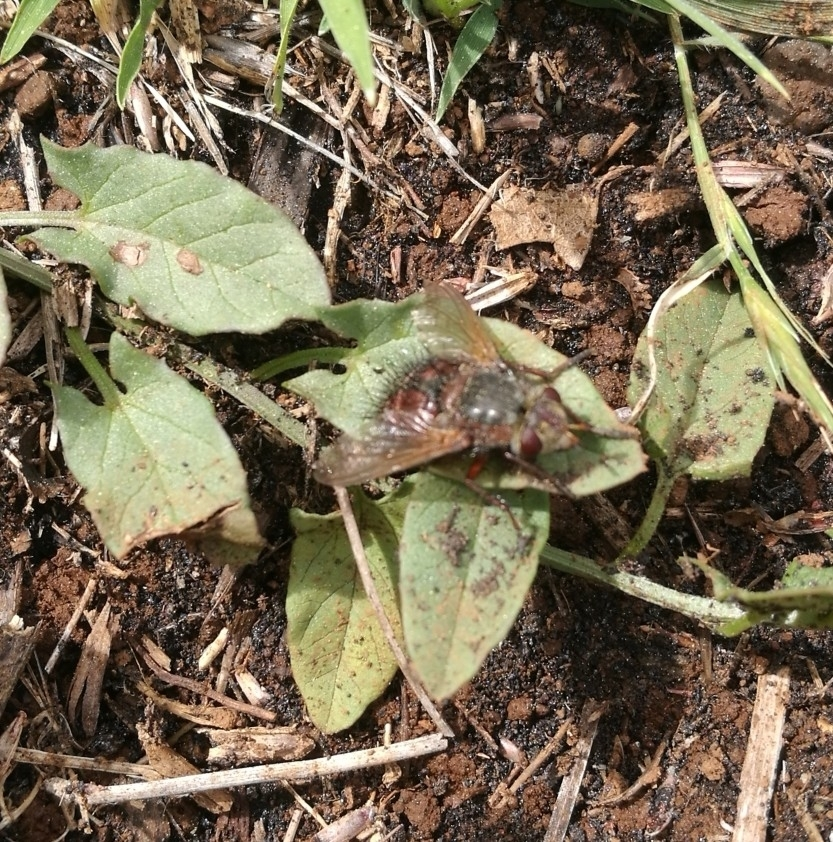

Scientific classification
- Kingdom: Animalia
- Phylum: Arthropoda
- Clade: Pancrustacea
- Class: Insecta
- Order: Diptera
- Family: Tachinidae
- Genus: Tachina
- Species: T. canariensis

Binomial name
- Tachina canariensis (Macquart, 1839)

= Tachina canariensis =

Species of fly

Tachina canariensis is a species of fly in the genus Tachina of the family Tachinidae that is endemic to Canary Islands. They are blackish-brown coloured.
