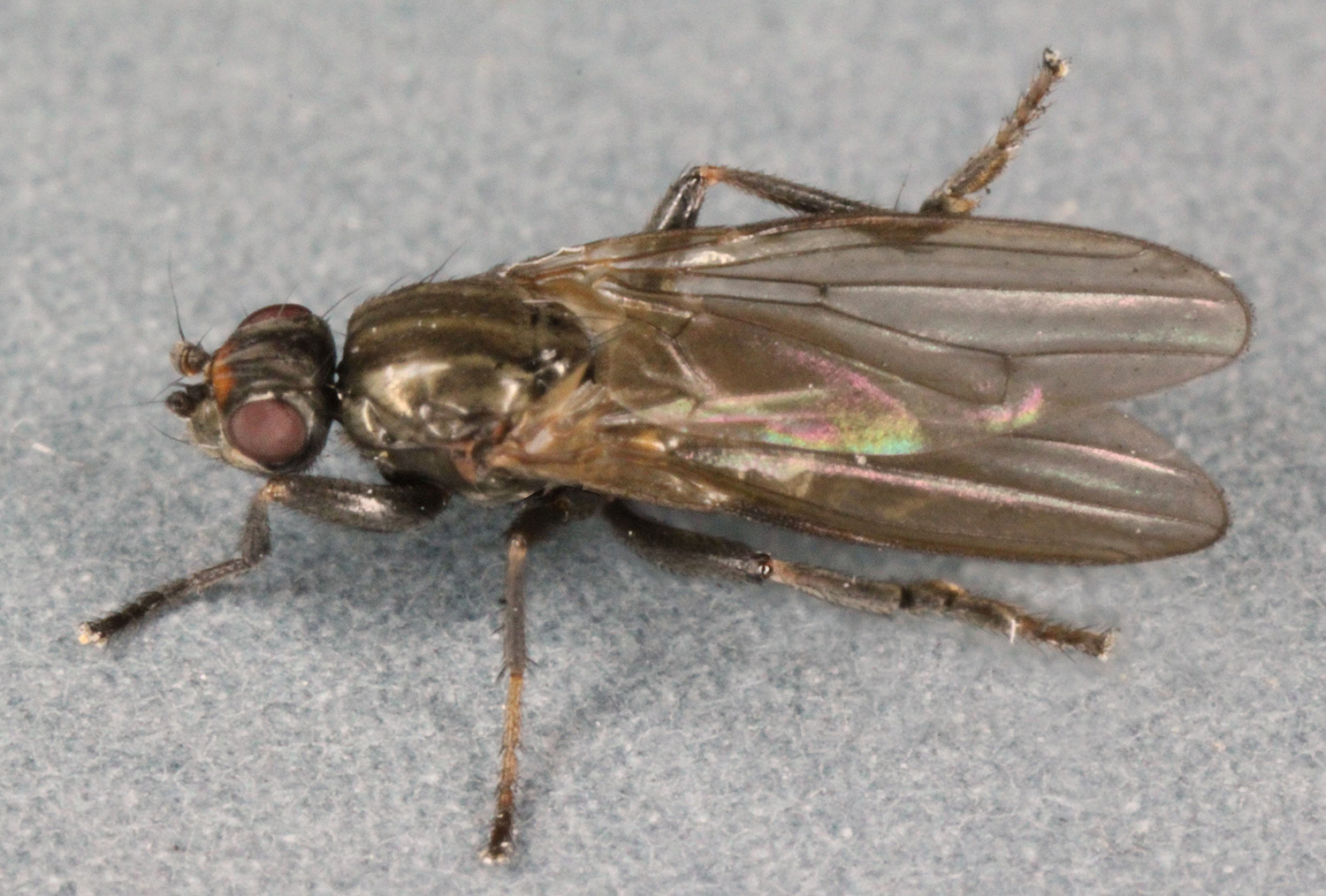
- Copromyza nigrina North Wales

Scientific classification
- Kingdom: Animalia
- Phylum: Arthropoda
- Class: Insecta
- Order: Diptera
- Family: Sphaeroceridae
- Genus: Copromyza
- Species: C. nigrina

Binomial name
- Copromyza nigrina (Gimmerthal, 1847)

Synonyms
- Borborus similis Collin, 1930

= Copromyza nigrina =

Species of fly

Copromyza nigrina is a species of fly in the family Sphaeroceridae. It is found in the Palearctic.
