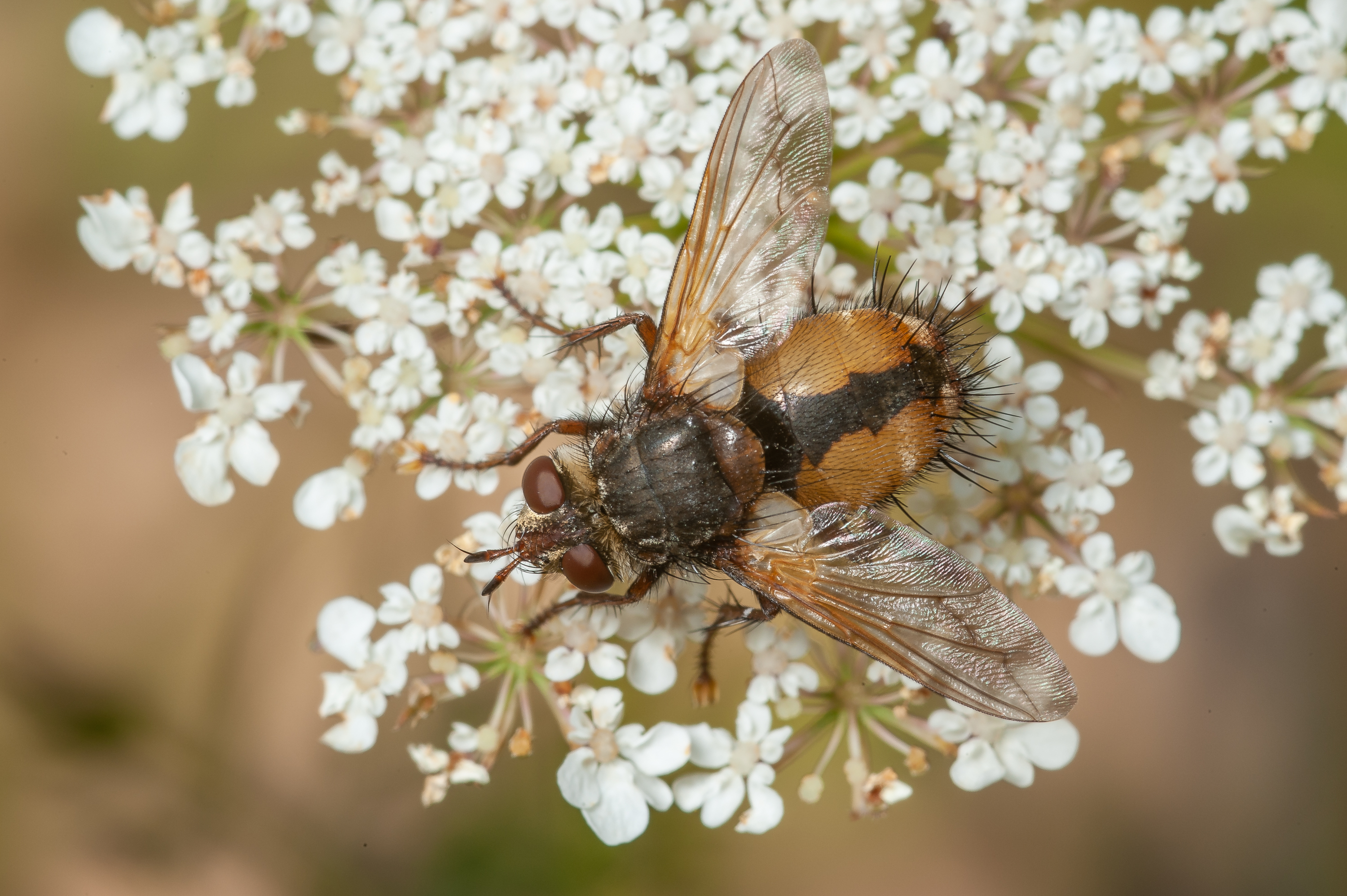

Scientific classification
- Kingdom: Animalia
- Phylum: Arthropoda
- Class: Insecta
- Order: Diptera
- Family: Tachinidae
- Genus: Tachina
- Species: T. fera

Binomial name
- Tachina fera (Linnaeus, 1761)

Synonyms
- List: Musca reccumbo Harris, 1776; Tachina reccumbo (Harris, 1776); Musca fera Linnaeus, 1761; Echinomyia algira Macquart, 1849; Echinomyia autumnalis Giglio-Tos, 1890; Echinomyia cenisia Giglio-Tos, 1891; Echinomyia fulviceps Meigen, 1838; Echinomyia intermedia Robineau-Desvoidy, 1830; Echinomyia ligustica Giglio-Tos, 1891; Echinomyia macquarti Giglio-Tos, 1891; Echinomyia meigeni Giglio-Tos, 1891; Echinomyia ruficornis Meigen, 1838; Echinomyia tetramera Zetterstedt, 1849; Musca rerumbo Harris, 1780; Tachina imitatrix Zimin, 1967; Tachina pamirica Zimin, 1967; Tachina virgo Meigen, 1824

= Tachina fera =

Species of fly

Tachina fera is a species of fly in the genus Tachina of the family Tachinidae. It was first described by Carl Linnaeus in 1761.

== Distribution ==
This species can be found in the entire Palearctic realm, across Europe as far north as Scandinavia and European Russia. It is also present in Israel and North Asia, east to China, Mongolia, Korea, and Japan, and in North Africa.

== Habitat ==
These flies inhabit the vegetation of humid regions, meadows, woodland, forests, forest edges, clearings, heath and moorland and natural gardens.

== Description ==
Tachina fera can reach a length of 9–14 millimetres (0.35–0.55 in), with a wingspan of 16–27 mm. These tachinids show a grayish upperside of the thorax, due to dense pollinosity, with regular black stripes. The abdomen is yellow orange with a wide black dorsal stripe ending in a point. They are bristly on the thorax and abdomen, especially towards the tip, where they have long thorn-shaped, protruding black bristles. Close to the thorax there is a striking, orange-red and shiny 'bump' called postscutellum, with a thin black edge. The head is yellowish colored, with long antennae, whose second segment is yellow, while the third, much shorter, is black. The back of the head shows yellowish hairs and the large compound eyes are red in color. The size of the eyes in relation to the head is sex dependent. The palps of the mouthparts are long, thin and thread like. The wings are slightly yellow tinged, show a brownish yellow veining and are yellow brown at the base. Calyptrae are whitish yellow. The legs are predominantly yellowish, but in the male they are usually dark with a yellow tip.

This species is very similar to Tachina magnicornis, that is a little smaller, has a medial dorsal band forming lozenges and that does not terminate in a point.

== Biology ==
There are two generations per year, as this species is bivoltine. Adults can be seen from the end April to the end June and from mid-July to mid-October. They feed on nectar and pollen of flowers, especially of Asteraceae (Cirsium arvense) and Apiaceae (Heracleum sphondylium). Females do not lay eggs, like a parasitic wasp, in the caterpillar, but on the leaves of a potential nutritive plant of the host caterpillars. When the eggs hatch the young larvae enter the body of the caterpillars (one larva per caterpillar) and eat them from the inside. In fact larvae are parasitoids of the caterpillars and larvae of other young insects, but mainly of moths in the families Noctuidae and Lymantriidae. In Britain afflicted species include the broom moth (Ceramica pisi), the dun-bar (Cosmia trapezina), small Quaker (Orthosia cruda) and common Quaker (Orthosia cerasi). They also parasitize caterpillars of the gypsy moth (Lymantria dispar), the black arches (Lymantria monacha), and the pine beauty (Panolis flammea). Pupation occurs outside the host in the soil litter. After about two weeks the adult flies will appear. This species has a potential economic importance in forest pest control.

== Bibliography ==
- Agnieszka Draber-Mońko: State of knowledge of the tachinid fauna of Eastern Asia, with new data from North Korea. Part II. Tachininae. In: FragmentaFaunistica, 54(2), 2011, S. 157–177.
- F.I. van Emden: Diptera Cyclorrhapha Calyptrata (1) Section a: Tachinidae and Calliphoridae. Handbook for the identification of British insects Vol X Part 4a. Published by the Royal Entomological Society of London, 1954
- H.P. Tschorsnig, V.A. Richter: Kap. 3.54. Family Tachinidae. In: L Papp, B Darvas (editors): Contributions to a Manual of Palaearctic Diptera, Vol 3: Higher Brachycera. Science Herald, Budapest 1998, S. 691–827.
- John O. Stireman III, James E. O'Hara, D. Monty Wood: Tachinidae: Evolution, Behavior, and Ecology. In: Annual Revue of Entomology, 51, 2006, S. 525–555, doi:10.1146/annurev.ento.51.110104.151133
- N. Muráriková, J. Vanhara, A. Tóthová, J. Havel: Polyphasic approach applying artificial neural networks, molecular analysis and postabdomen morphology to West Palaearctic Tachina spp. (Diptera, Tachinidae). In: Bulletin of Entomological Research, 101, 2011, S. 165–175, doi:10.1017/S0007485310000295
- Sergey P.Gaponov: Evolution trends in Tachinid egg morphology. In: Arch. Universidad de Granada, 9, 1997, S. 33–54.
