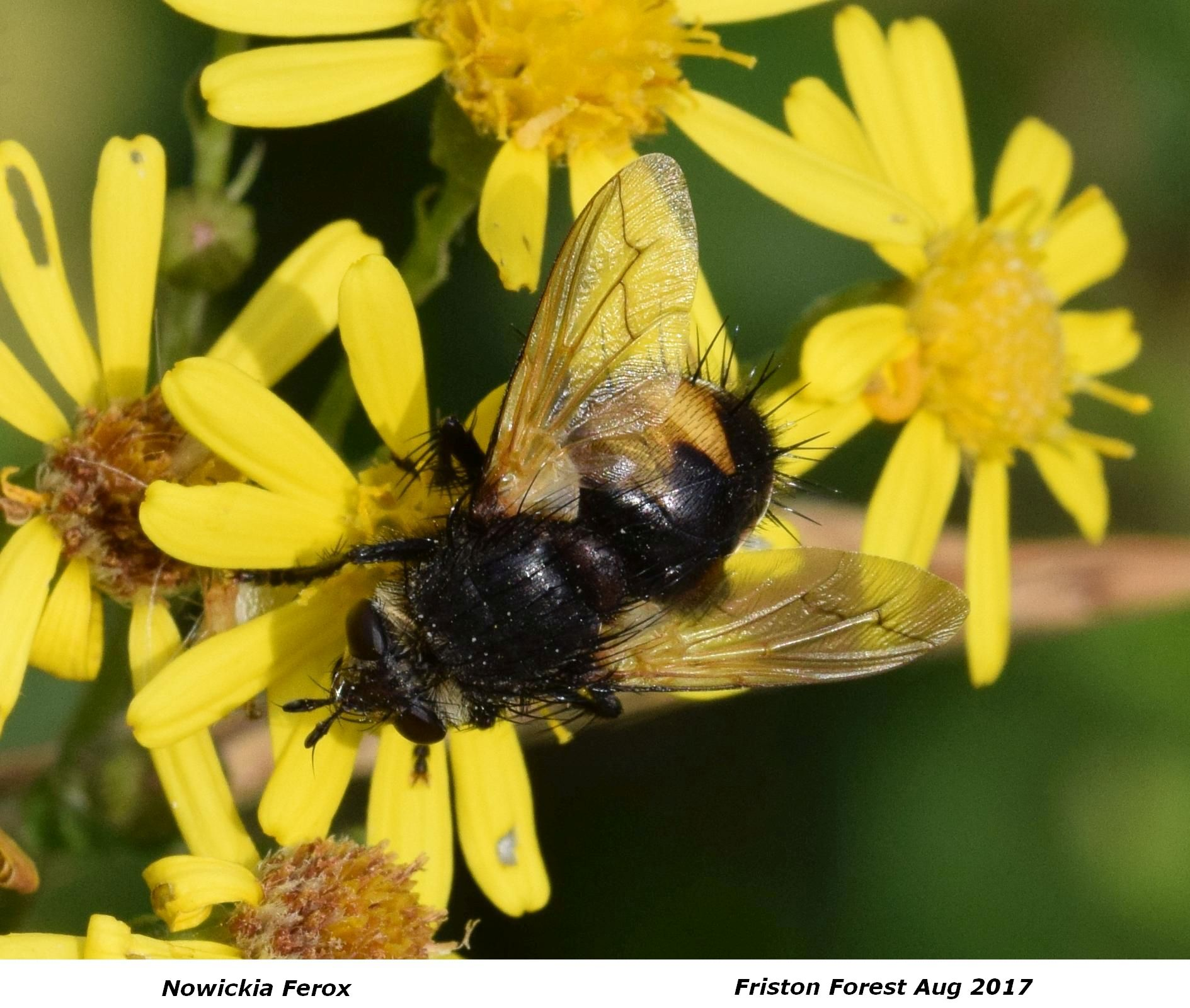
- Tachinid fly, Tachina (Nowickia) ferox, dorsal view

Scientific classification
- Kingdom: Animalia
- Phylum: Arthropoda
- Class: Insecta
- Order: Diptera
- Family: Tachinidae
- Tribe: Tachinini
- Genus: Tachina
- Subgenus: Nowickia
- Species: T. ferox

Binomial name
- Tachina ferox (Panzer, 1809)

Synonyms
- Tachina ferox Panzer, 1809; Echinomyia nigricornis Robineau-Desvoidy, 1830; Fabriciella pandellei Baranov, 1929

= Tachina ferox =

Species of fly

Tachina (Nowickia) ferox is a species of fly in the family Tachinidae first described by Georg Wolfgang Franz Panzer in 1809.

== Distribution and habitat ==
This species is present in most of Europe. These flies mainly inhabit spruce forest edge, meadows, areas of heath and mountains at an elevation up to 1,500 metres (4,900 ft) above sea level.

== Description ==
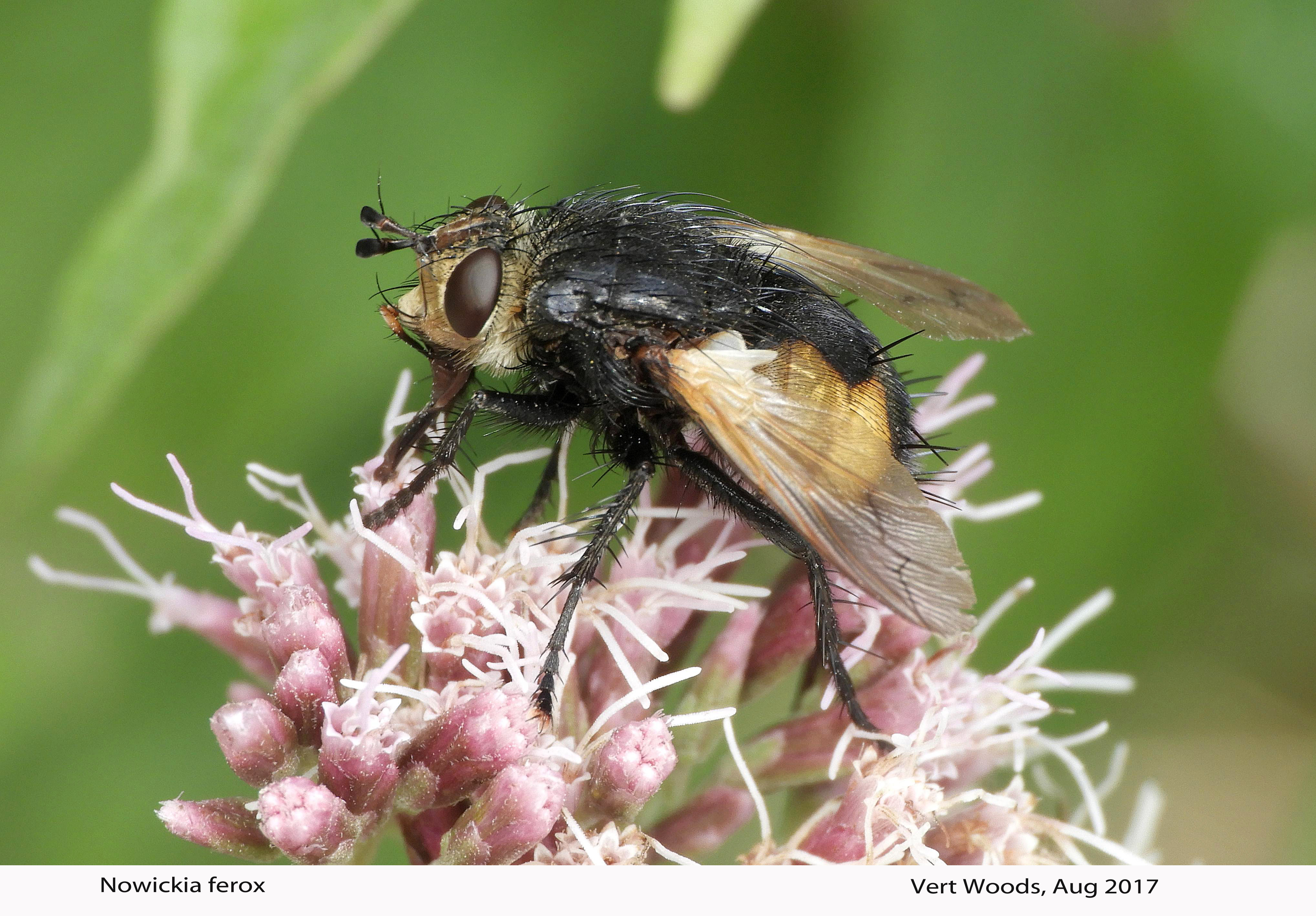
Side view

Tachina (Nowickia) ferox can reach a length of 11–15 millimetres (0.43–0.59 in). These flies have a black hairy thorax and a yellow-red abdomen, with a black longitudinal marking in the middle and numerous long straight bristles at the end. Wings are hyaline (glass like), yellowish at the base. Basal half of the palps are brown or blackish. Males are a little concave in theirs dorsal centre. In the abdomen only segments 7 and 8 are hairy.

== Biology ==
Tachina (Nowickia) ferox is a univoltine species. Adults can be found from mid-June to October, with a peak from June to August. They fed on nectar and pollen, especially of Centaurea jacea. Larvae develop in the dark arches moth (Apamea monoglypha).
