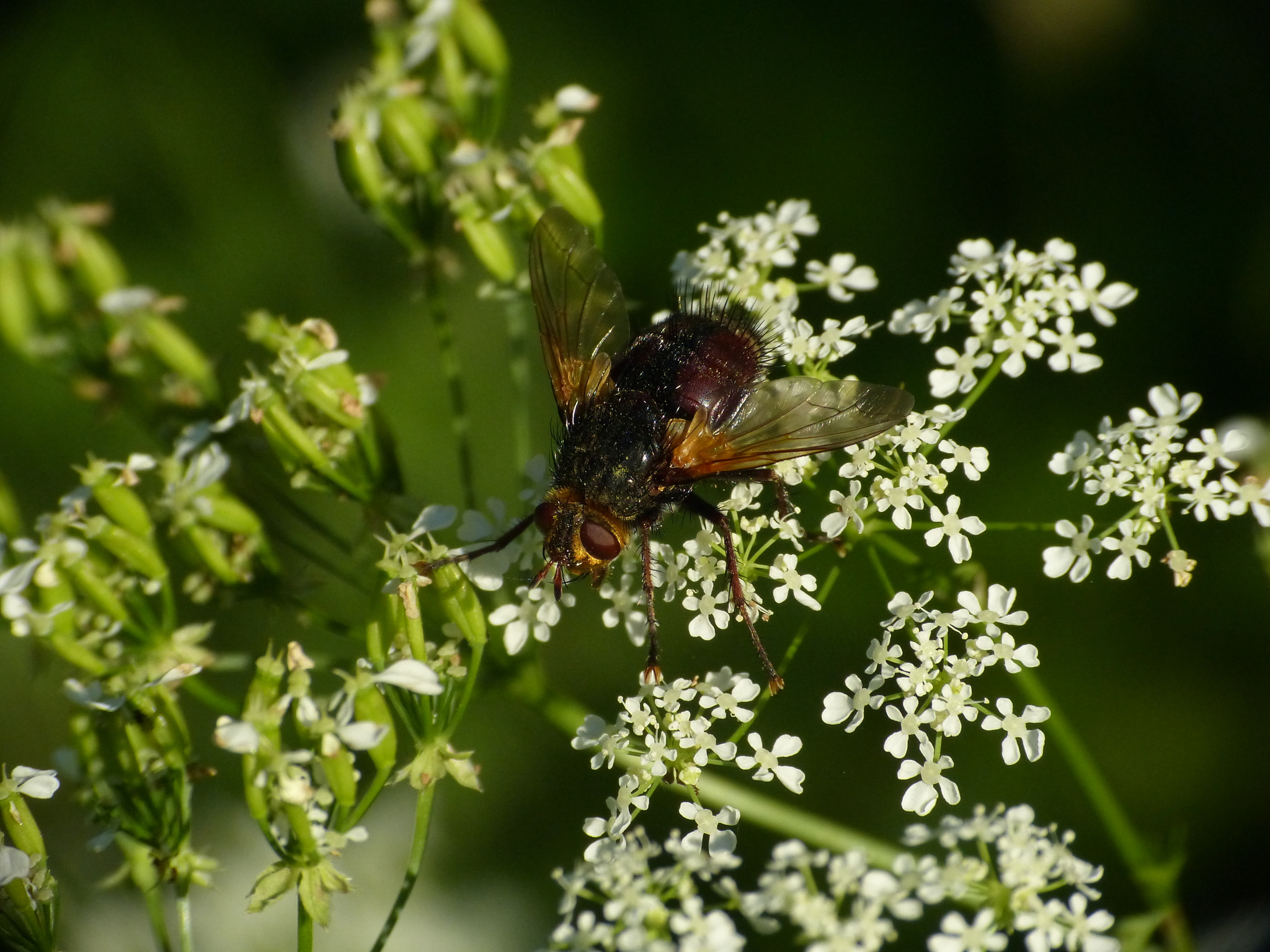

Scientific classification
- Kingdom: Animalia
- Phylum: Arthropoda
- Class: Insecta
- Order: Diptera
- Family: Tachinidae
- Genus: Tachina
- Species: T. magna

Binomial name
- Tachina magna (Giglio-Tos, 1890)

= Tachina magna =

Species of fly

Tachina magna is a species of fly in the genus Tachina of the family Tachinidae that can be found in such European countries as Albania, Bulgaria, France, Greece, Italy, Romania, Spain, and Ukraine.
