= Tachina tadzhica =

Scientific classification
- Kingdom: Animalia
- Phylum: Arthropoda
- Class: Insecta
- Order: Diptera
- Family: Tachinidae
- Genus: Tachina
- Species: T. tadzhica

Binomial name
- Tachina tadzhica (Zimin, 1980)

Species of fly

Tachina barbata is a species of fly in the genus Tachina of the family Tachinidae that is endemic to Tajikistan.
