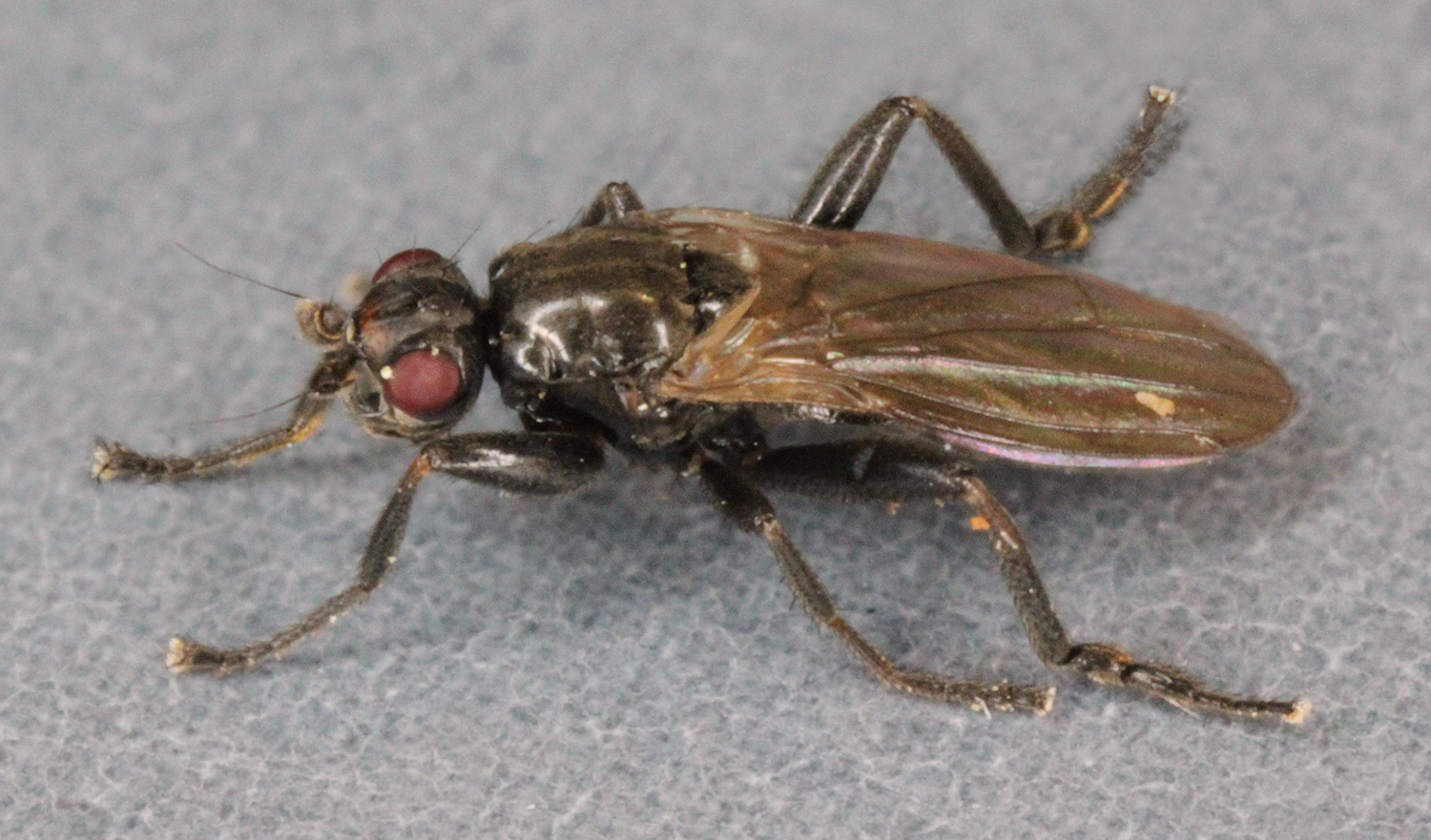
- Copromyza stercoraria North Wales

Scientific classification
- Kingdom: Animalia
- Phylum: Arthropoda
- Class: Insecta
- Order: Diptera
- Family: Sphaeroceridae
- Genus: Copromyza
- Species: C. stercoraria

Binomial name
- Copromyza stercoraria (Meigen, 1830)

Synonyms
- Borborus stercoraria Meigen, 1830; Borborus nigrifemoratus Macquart, 1835; Copromyza tibialis Zetterstedt, 1847; Copromyza pallipes Stenhammar, 1855; Cypsela zetterstedti Wahlgren, 1918; Cypsela stenhammari Wahlgren, 1918

= Copromyza stercoraria =

Species of fly

Copromyza stercoraria is a species of fly in the family Sphaeroceridae. It is found in the Palearctic.
