= Tachina acuminata =

Scientific classification
- Kingdom: Animalia
- Phylum: Arthropoda
- Class: Insecta
- Order: Diptera
- Family: Tachinidae
- Genus: Tachina
- Species: T. acuminata

Binomial name
- Tachina acuminata (Tothill, 1924)

Species of fly

Tachina acuminata is a species of fly in the genus Tachina of the family Tachinidae that can be found in Mexico and the United States.
