= Tachina tephra =

Scientific classification
- Kingdom: Animalia
- Phylum: Arthropoda
- Class: Insecta
- Order: Diptera
- Family: Tachinidae
- Genus: Tachina
- Species: T. tephra

Binomial name
- Tachina tephra Meigen, 1824

Species of fly

Tachina tephra is a species of fly in the genus Tachina of the family Tachinidae that is endemic to Austria.
