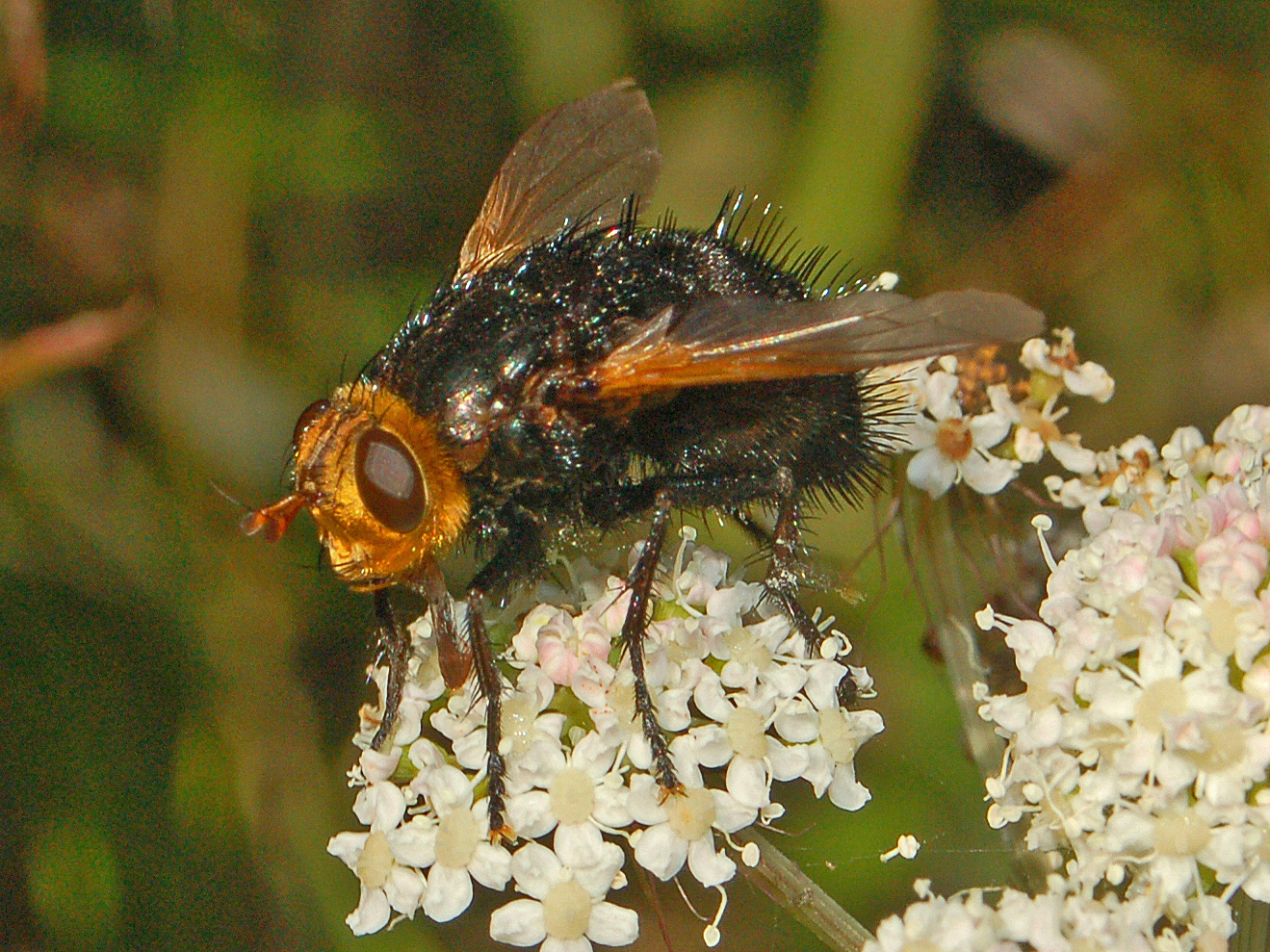

Scientific classification
- Kingdom: Animalia
- Phylum: Arthropoda
- Class: Insecta
- Order: Diptera
- Family: Tachinidae
- Genus: Tachina
- Species: T. grossa

Binomial name
- Tachina grossa (Linnaeus, 1758)

Synonyms
- Musca grossa Linnaeus, 1758; Musca interrupta Geoffroy, 1785

= Tachina grossa =

Species of fly

Tachina grossa is a very large tachinid fly.

== Distribution ==
This species can be found throughout most of Western Europe, east to Asia and in Mongolia.

== Habitat ==
These flies mainly inhabit dry open meadows, peat land, moors, forests, heaths and gardens.

== Description ==
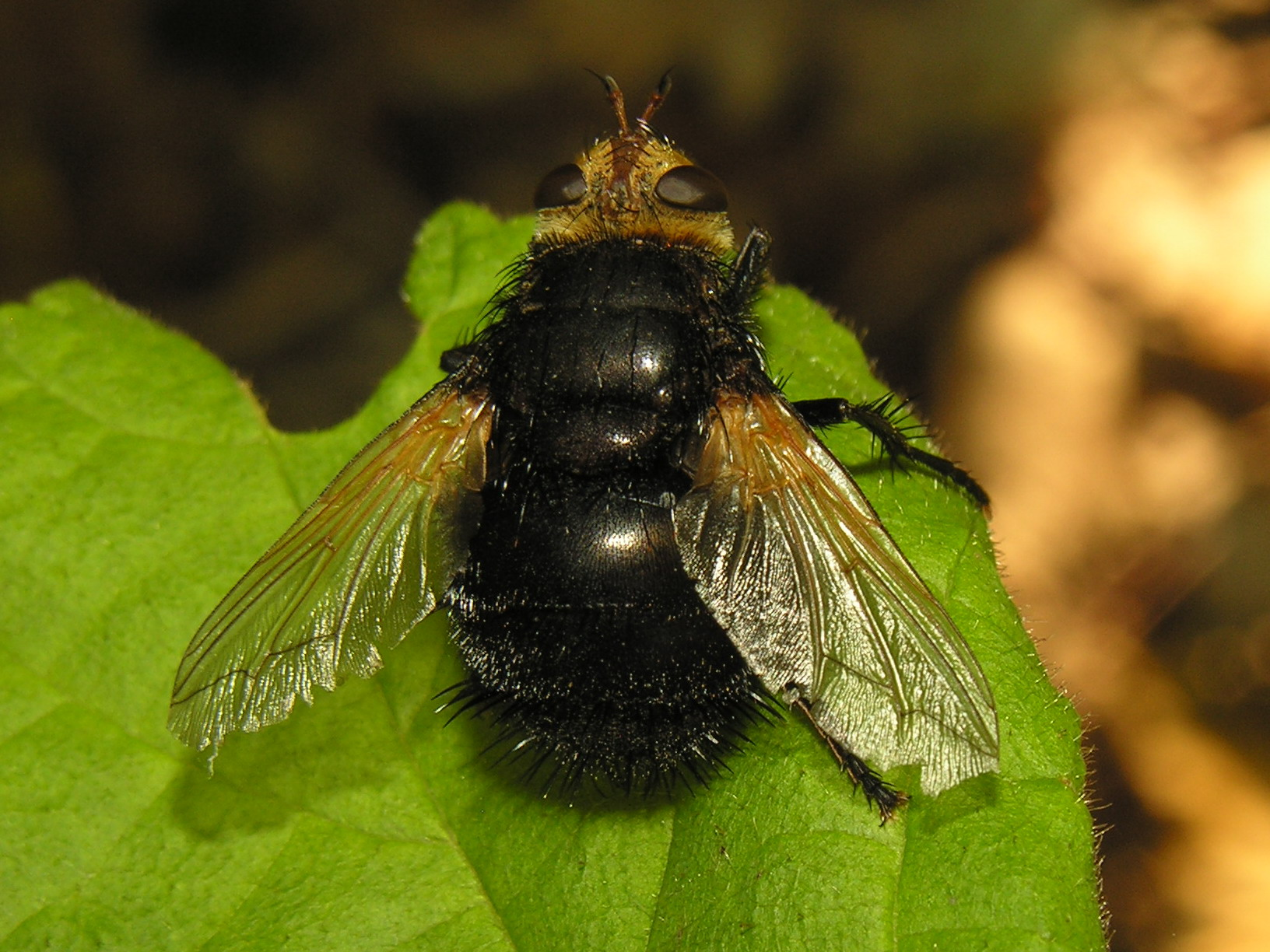
Dorsal view

Tachina grossa can reach a length of 15–19 millimetres (0.6–0.7 in). This species of fly is one of the largest throughout much of its range and is the largest tachinid in Europe. These flies are very distinctive, being hairy and with a black thorax and abdomen. In flight they resemble a bumblebee. The inflated, curved, all-black abdomen is covered with stiff, straight bristles, especially at the end of the abdominal segments. The head is bright yellow, with occipital yellow bristles. The large compound eyes are dark brown. The forehead forms a sharp angle at the base of the antennae. Maxillary palpi are thin, filiform. Wings are hyaline, yellowish-brown at the base.

== Biology ==
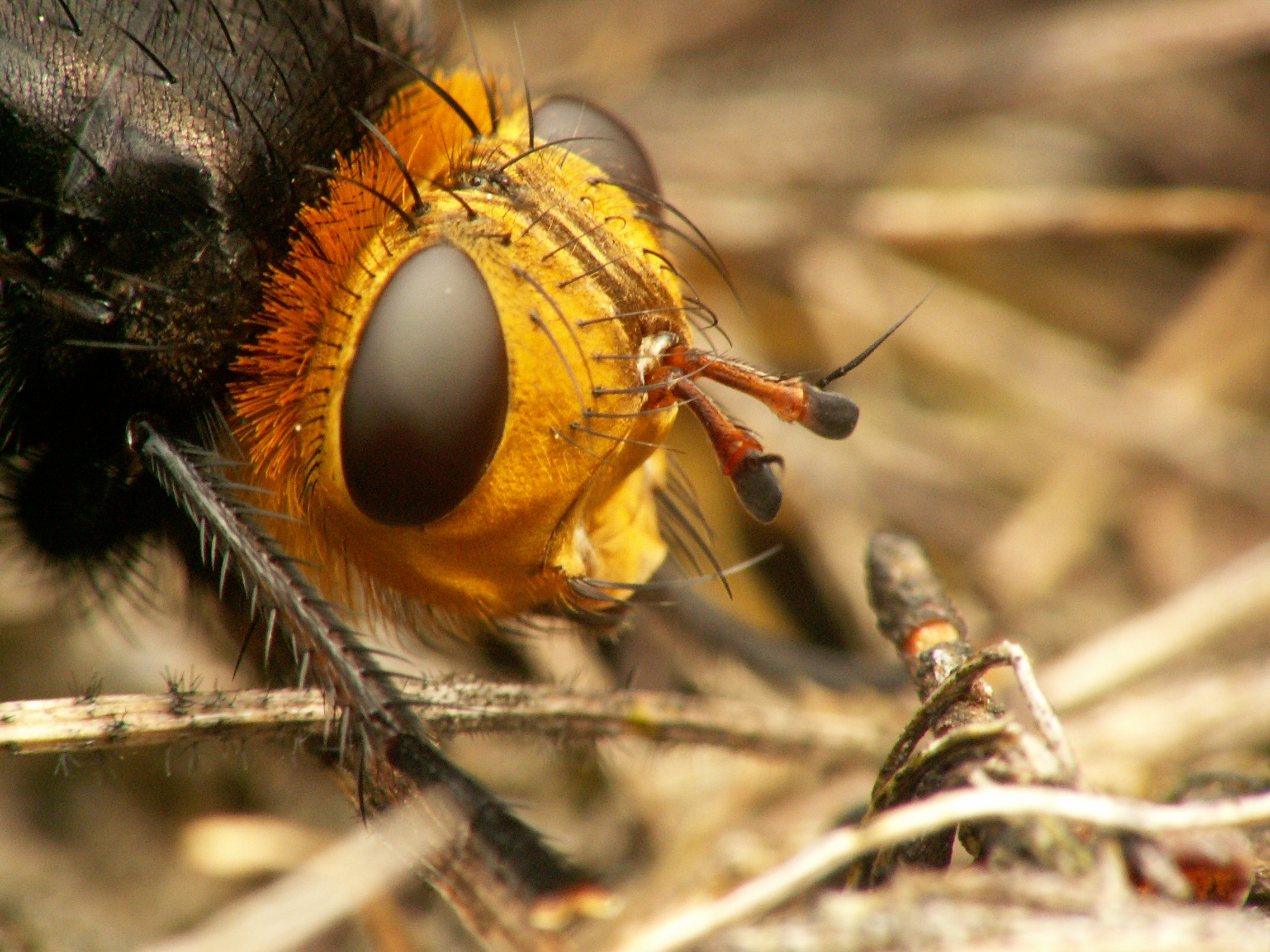
Tachina grossa, close-up on eyes

The adult flight period is from late June to early September. In the UK there is usually only one generation per year, though in southern Europe there may be two generations per summer season, though this has not yet been verified. Adults feed on nectar and pollen of flowers.

Like most tachinid flies, the female lays eggs on other living insect larva, the fly larvae then develop inside the living host, devouring it and eventually killing it. Its main hosts are the large hairy Lepidopteran caterpillars, particularly the oak eggar moth (Lasiocampa quercus), the fox moth (Macrothylacia rubi) and other Lasiocampidae.
