= Tachina breviventris =

Scientific classification
- Kingdom: Animalia
- Phylum: Arthropoda
- Class: Insecta
- Order: Diptera
- Family: Tachinidae
- Genus: Tachina
- Species: T. breviventris

Binomial name
- Tachina breviventris (Wiedemann, 1830)

Species of fly

Tachina breviventris is a species of fly in the genus Tachina of the family Tachinidae that is endemic to Brazil.
