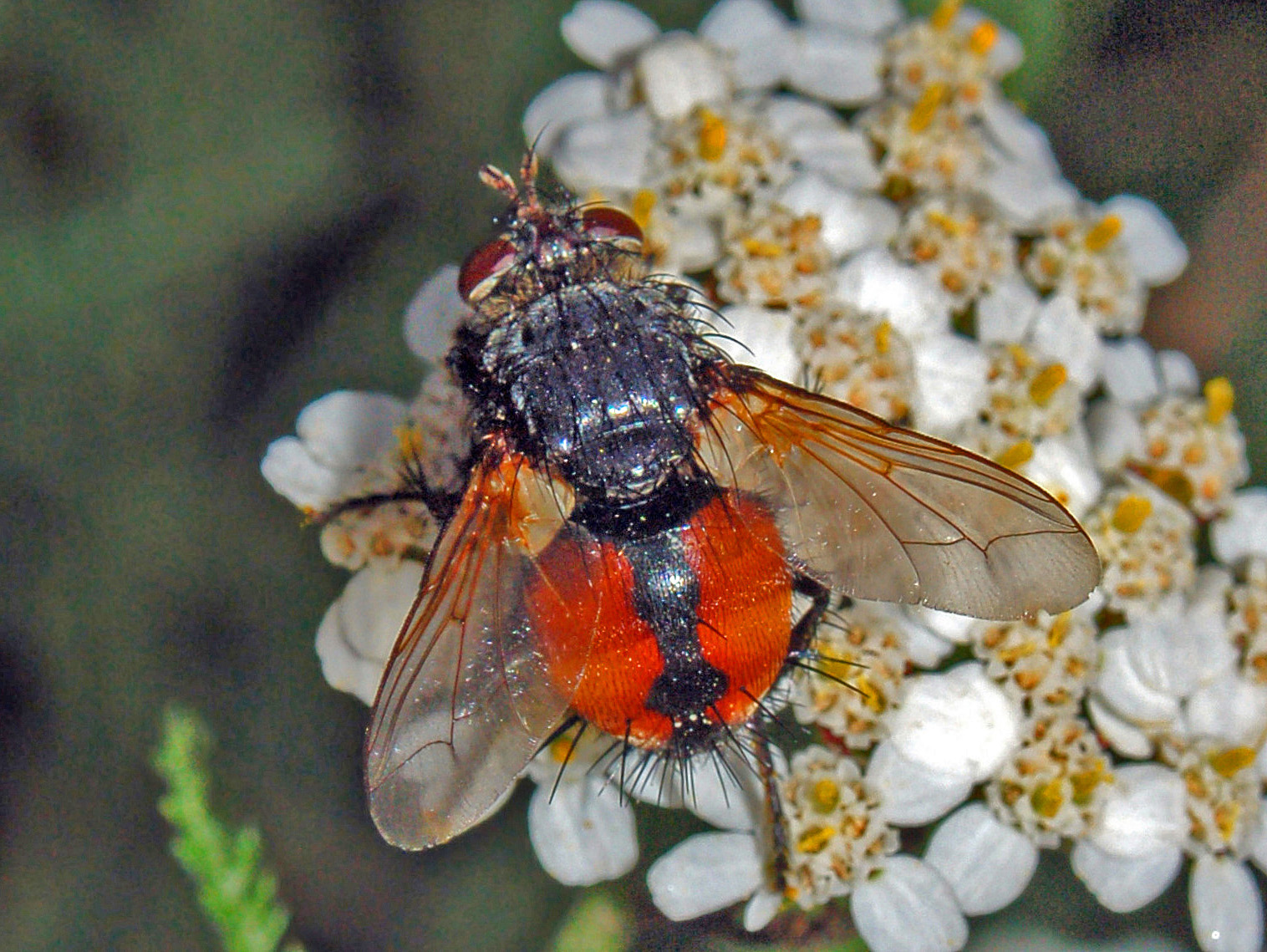
- Tachina (Nowickia) ferox

Scientific classification
- Kingdom: Animalia
- Phylum: Arthropoda
- Class: Insecta
- Order: Diptera
- Family: Tachinidae
- Subfamily: Tachininae
- Tribe: Tachinini
- Genus: Tachina
- Subgenus: Nowickia; Wachtl, 1894

Synonyms
- Belosiphonomyia Zimin, 1935; Diplopygomyia Zimin, 1935; Gigliomyia Zimin, 1935; Reinigia Enderlein, 1934; Rohdendorfiola Zimin, 1935

= Nowickia =

Subgenus of flies

Nowickia is a subgenus of large flies in the family Tachinidae.

== Taxonomy ==
Treated by some authors as a subgenus of Tachina Meigen, 1803, formally, most authors accepted as a valid genus and treated separately. However, the most recent review has reinstated it as a subgenus.

== Species ==
- Tachina (Nowickia) alpina (Zetterstedt, 1849)
- Tachina (Nowickia) astra (Zimin, 1935)
- Tachina (Nowickia) atripalpis (Robineau-Desvoidy, 1863)
- Tachina (Nowickia) brevipalpis Zhao & Zhou, 1993
- Tachina (Nowickia) deflexa Zimin, 1980
- Tachina (Nowickia) deludans (Villeneuve, 1936)
- Tachina (Nowickia) ferox (Meigen & Panzer, 1806)
- Tachina (Nowickia) funebris (Villeneuve, 1936)
- Tachina (Nowickia) gussakovskii (Zimin, 1928)
- Tachina (Nowickia) gussakovskyi Zimin, 1980
- Tachina (Nowickia) heifu Chao & Shi, 1982
- Tachina (Nowickia) hingstoniae Mesnil, 1970
- Tachina (Nowickia) latilinea Zhao & Zhou, 1993
- Tachina (Nowickia) marklini (Zetterstedt, 1837)
- Tachina (Nowickia) memorabilis (Zimin, 1949)
- Tachina (Nowickia) mongolica (Zimin, 1935)
- Tachina (Nowickia) nigrovillosa (Zimin, 1935)
- Tachina (Nowickia) pamirica (Enderlein, 1934)
- Tachina (Nowickia) polita (Zimin, 1935)
- Tachina (Nowickia) reducta Mesnil, 1970
- Tachina (Nowickia) rondanii (Giglio-Tos, 1890)
- Tachina (Nowickia) strobelii (Rondani, 1865)
- Tachina (Nowickia) umbripennis (Zimin, 1974)
