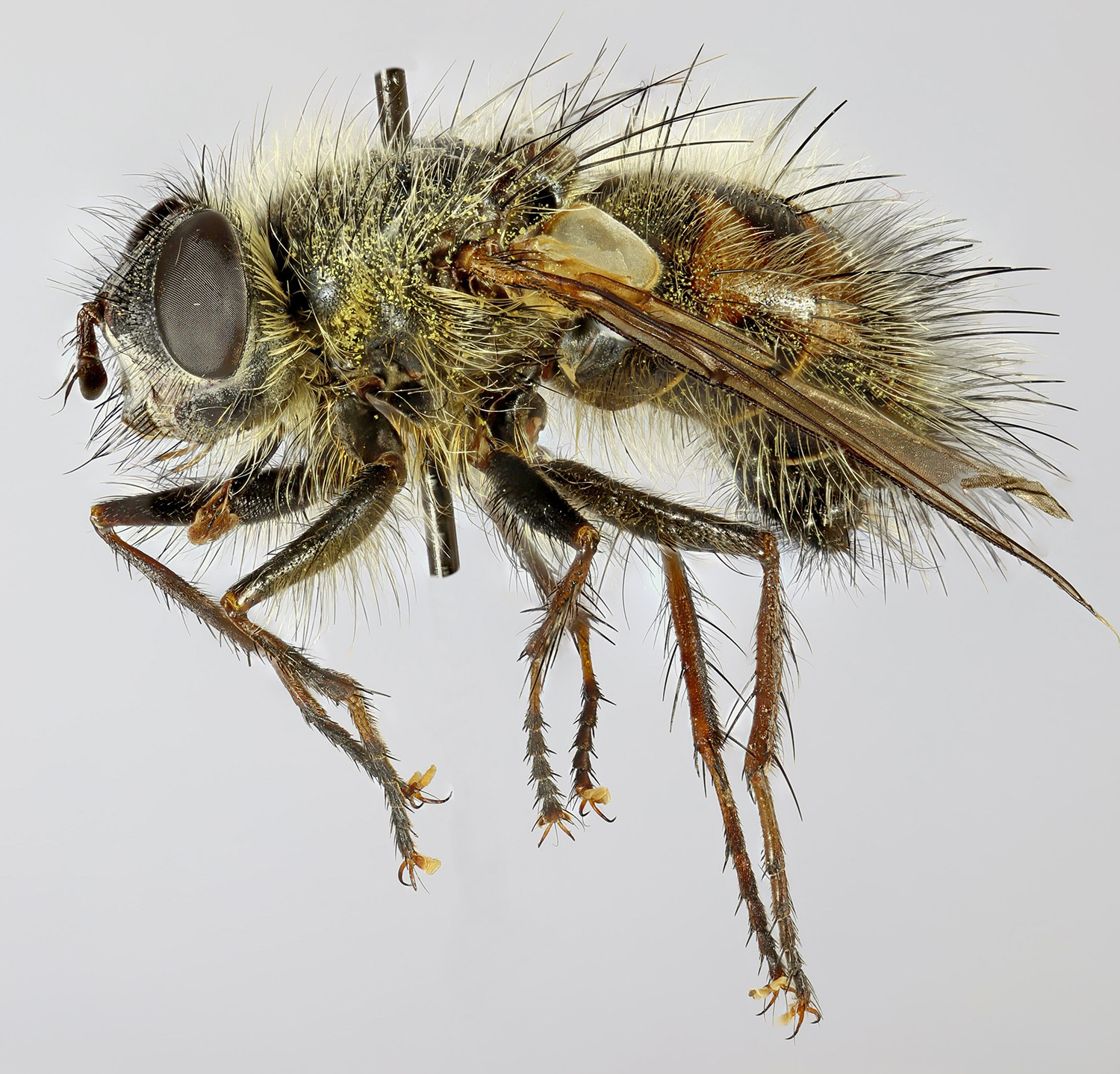

Scientific classification
- Kingdom: Animalia
- Phylum: Arthropoda
- Class: Insecta
- Order: Diptera
- Family: Tachinidae
- Genus: Tachina
- Species: T. lurida

Binomial name
- Tachina lurida (Fabricius, 1781)

= Tachina lurida =

Species of fly

Tachina lurida is a species of fly in the genus Tachina of the family Tachinidae that can be found throughout most of Europe.
