= Mystacella aurea =

Scientific classification
- Kingdom: Animalia
- Phylum: Arthropoda
- Class: Insecta
- Order: Diptera
- Family: Tachinidae
- Subfamily: Exoristinae
- Tribe: Goniini
- Genus: Mystacella
- Species: M. aurea

Binomial name
- Mystacella aurea (Townsend, 1916)

Synonyms
- Macromeigenia aurea Townsend, 1916

Species of fly

Mystacella aurea is a species of bristle fly in the family Tachinidae.

== Distribution ==
Mystacella aurea can be found around Brazil.
