= Tachina alticola =

Scientific classification
- Kingdom: Animalia
- Phylum: Arthropoda
- Class: Insecta
- Order: Diptera
- Family: Tachinidae
- Genus: Tachina
- Species: T. alticola

Binomial name
- Tachina alticola (Malloch, 1932)

Species of fly

Tachina alacer is a species of fly in the genus Tachina of the family Tachinidae that is endemic to Borneo.
