= Tachina ursinoidea =

Scientific classification
- Kingdom: Animalia
- Phylum: Arthropoda
- Class: Insecta
- Order: Diptera
- Family: Tachinidae
- Genus: Tachina
- Species: T. ursinoidea

Binomial name
- Tachina ursinoidea (Tothill, 1918)

Synonyms
- Servillia rufa; Tachina fulva

Species of fly

Tachina ursinoidea is a species of fly in the genus Tachina of the family Tachinidae that can be found in Burma, China, Nepal, Taiwan, Thailand, and Indian provinces like Assam, Uttar Pradesh, and Western Bengal.
