= Tachina turanica =

Scientific classification
- Kingdom: Animalia
- Phylum: Arthropoda
- Class: Insecta
- Order: Diptera
- Family: Tachinidae
- Genus: Tachina
- Species: T. turanica

Binomial name
- Tachina turanica Zimin, 1980

Species of fly

Tachina turanica is a species of fly in the genus Tachina of the family Tachinidae that is endemic to Russia.
