= Copromyza neglecta =

Scientific classification
- Kingdom: Animalia
- Phylum: Arthropoda
- Class: Insecta
- Order: Diptera
- Family: Sphaeroceridae
- Genus: Copromyza
- Species: C. neglecta

Binomial name
- Copromyza neglecta (Malloch, 1913)

Synonyms
- Borborus calcitrans Spuler, 1925; Borborus neglecta Malloch, 1913

Species of fly

Copromyza neglecta is a species of lesser dung fly in the family Sphaeroceridae. It is found in Europe.
