= Tachina brevicornis =

Scientific classification
- Kingdom: Animalia
- Phylum: Arthropoda
- Class: Insecta
- Order: Diptera
- Family: Tachinidae
- Genus: Tachina
- Species: T. brevicornis

Binomial name
- Tachina brevicornis Macquart, 1854

Species of fly

Tachina brevicornis is a species of fly in the genus Tachina of the family Tachinidae that is endemic to France.
