= Mystacella =

Scientific classification
- Kingdom: Animalia
- Phylum: Arthropoda
- Class: Insecta
- Order: Diptera
- Family: Tachinidae
- Subfamily: Exoristinae
- Tribe: Goniini
- Genus: Mystacella; Wulp, 1890

Type species
- Mystacella solita Wulp, 1890

Synonyms
- Bolomyia Brauer & von Berganstamm, 1891; Macromeigenia Brauer & von Berganstamm, 1891; Organomyia Townsend, 1915

Genus of flies

Mystacella is a genus of flies in the family Tachinidae.

== Species ==
- Mystacella aurea (Townsend, 1916)
- Mystacella chrysoprocta (Wiedemann, 1830)
- Mystacella commetans (Walker, 1861)
- Mystacella flavifrons Wulp, 1890
- Mystacella frioensis (Reinhard, 1921)
- Mystacella frontalis (Townsend, 1915)
- Mystacella rufata (Bigot, 1889)
- Mystacella solita Wulp, 1890
- Mystacella violacea Wulp, 1890
