= Tachina bijuncta =

Scientific classification
- Kingdom: Animalia
- Phylum: Arthropoda
- Class: Insecta
- Order: Diptera
- Family: Tachinidae
- Genus: Tachina
- Species: T. bijuncta

Binomial name
- Tachina bijuncta Walker, 1853

Species of fly

Tachina bijuncta is a species of fly in the genus Tachina of the family Tachinidae that is endemic to England.
