= Tachina victoria =

Scientific classification
- Kingdom: Animalia
- Phylum: Arthropoda
- Class: Insecta
- Order: Diptera
- Family: Tachinidae
- Genus: Tachina
- Species: T. victoria

Binomial name
- Tachina victoria (Townsend, 1897)

Species of fly

Tachina vernalis is a species of fly in the genus Tachina of the family Tachinidae that is endemic to US state of New Mexico.
