= Tachina brunneri =

Scientific classification
- Kingdom: Animalia
- Phylum: Arthropoda
- Class: Insecta
- Order: Diptera
- Family: Tachinidae
- Genus: Tachina
- Species: T. brunneri

Binomial name
- Tachina brunneri (Loew, 1873)

Species of fly

Tachina brunneri is a species of fly in the genus Tachina of the family Tachinidae that is endemic to Serbia.
