= Tachina testaceipes =

Scientific classification
- Kingdom: Animalia
- Phylum: Arthropoda
- Class: Insecta
- Order: Diptera
- Family: Tachinidae
- Genus: Tachina
- Species: T. testaceipes

Binomial name
- Tachina testaceipes Stephens, 1829

Species of fly

Tachina testaceipes is a species of fly in the genus Tachina of the family Tachinidae that is endemic to England.
