= Tachina vicina =

Scientific classification
- Kingdom: Animalia
- Phylum: Arthropoda
- Class: Insecta
- Order: Diptera
- Family: Tachinidae
- Genus: Tachina
- Species: T. vicina

Binomial name
- Tachina vicina Robineau-Desvoidy, 1830

Species of fly

Tachina vicina is a species of fly in the genus Tachina of the family Tachinidae that is endemic to France.
