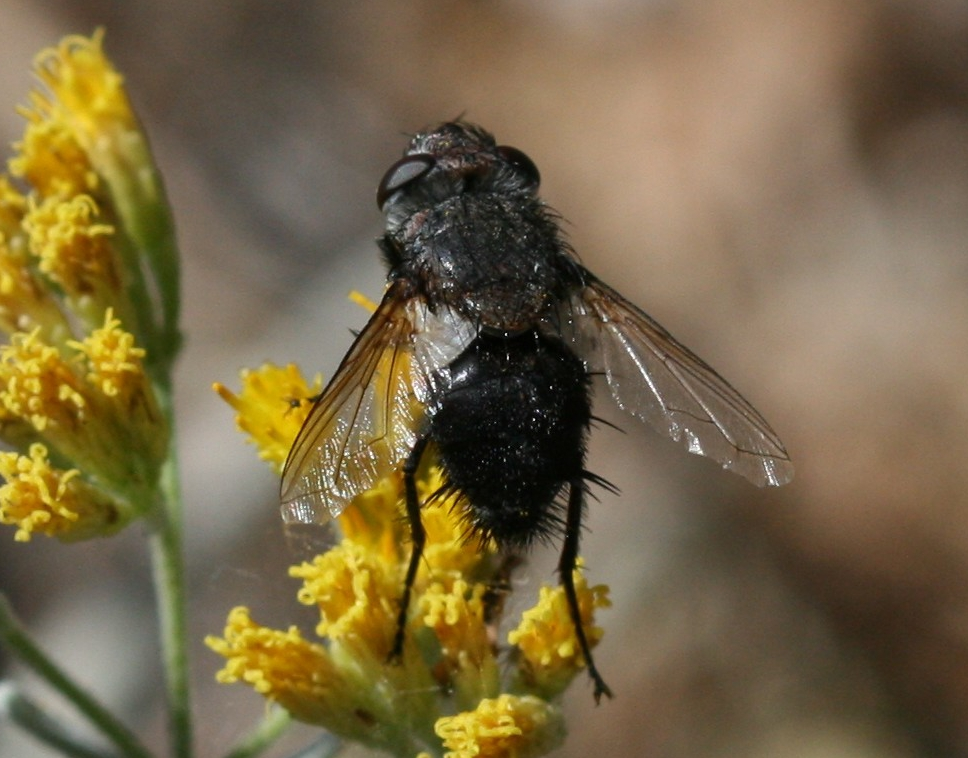
- Pseudogonia fasciata

Scientific classification
- Kingdom: Animalia
- Phylum: Arthropoda
- Class: Insecta
- Order: Diptera
- Family: Tachinidae
- Subfamily: Exoristinae
- Tribe: Goniini
- Genus: Pseudogonia; Brauer & von Berganstamm, 1889

Type species
- Gonia cinerascens Rondani, 1859

Synonyms
- Gaediogonia Townsend, 1927

= Pseudogonia =

Genus of flies

Pseudogonia is a genus of flies in the family Tachinidae.

== Species ==
- Pseudogonia fasciata (Wiedemann, 1819)
- Pseudogonia madagascariensis Villeneuve, 1915
- Pseudogonia metallaria Cerretti, 2004
- Pseudogonia parisiaca (Robineau-Desvoidy, 1851)
- Pseudogonia rufifrons (Wiedemann, 1830)
- Pseudogonia suspecta Villeneuve, 1915
- Pseudogonia valens (Richter, 1974)
