= Tachina chaetaria =

Scientific classification
- Kingdom: Animalia
- Phylum: Arthropoda
- Class: Insecta
- Order: Diptera
- Family: Tachinidae
- Genus: Tachina
- Species: T. chaetaria

Binomial name
- Tachina chaetaria Zimin, 1980

Species of fly

Tachina chaetaria is a species of fly in the genus Tachina of the family Tachinidae that is endemic to Tajikistan.
