= Tachina amurensis =

Scientific classification
- Kingdom: Animalia
- Phylum: Arthropoda
- Class: Insecta
- Order: Diptera
- Family: Tachinidae
- Genus: Tachina
- Species: T. amurensis

Binomial name
- Tachina amurensis (Zimin, 1929)

Synonyms
- Servillia cincta

Species of fly

Tachina amurensis is a species of fly in the genus Tachina of the family Tachinidae that can be found in Japan and Russia.
