= Tachina tricolor =

Scientific classification
- Kingdom: Animalia
- Phylum: Arthropoda
- Class: Insecta
- Order: Diptera
- Family: Tachinidae
- Genus: Tachina
- Species: T. tricolor

Binomial name
- Tachina tricolor (Lichtwardt, 1909)

Species of fly

Tachina tricolor is a species of fly in the genus Tachina of the family Tachinidae that is endemic to Himachal Pradesh, a province of India.
