= Tachina nupta =

Scientific classification
- Kingdom: Animalia
- Phylum: Arthropoda
- Class: Insecta
- Order: Diptera
- Family: Tachinidae
- Genus: Tachina
- Species: T. nupta

Binomial name
- Tachina nupta (Rondani, 1859)

Synonyms
- Echinomyia micado; Echinomyia trigonata; Tachina mesnili; Tachina nigriventris; Tachina orientalis; Tachina turanica

Species of fly

Tachina nupta is a species of fly in the genus Tachina of the family Tachinidae that can be found in such European countries as Austria, Bulgaria, Czech Republic, France, Germany, Hungary, Italy, Moldova, Romania, Switzerland, Ukraine, Yugoslavia, and Sicily island. They can also be found in Japan, Mongolia, and in Chinese capital, Beijing.

== Larvae ==
The species larvae transfers parasites into various caterpillars of moths and butterflies.
