= Tachina apicalis =

Scientific classification
- Kingdom: Animalia
- Phylum: Arthropoda
- Class: Insecta
- Order: Diptera
- Family: Tachinidae
- Genus: Tachina
- Species: T. apicalis

Binomial name
- Tachina apicalis Meigen, 1824

Species of fly

Tachina apicalis is a species of fly in the genus Tachina of the family Tachinidae that can be found in China and Germany.
