= Tachina breviala =

Scientific classification
- Kingdom: Animalia
- Phylum: Arthropoda
- Class: Insecta
- Order: Diptera
- Family: Tachinidae
- Genus: Tachina
- Species: T. breviala

Binomial name
- Tachina breviala (Chao, 1987)

Species of fly

Tachina breviala is a species of fly in the genus Tachina of the family Tachinidae that is endemic to China.
