= Tachina trigonophora =

Scientific classification
- Kingdom: Animalia
- Phylum: Arthropoda
- Class: Insecta
- Order: Diptera
- Family: Tachinidae
- Genus: Tachina
- Species: T. trigonophora

Binomial name
- Tachina trigonophora Zimin, 1980

Species of fly

Tachina trigonophora is a species of fly in the genus Tachina of the family Tachinidae that is endemic to North Korea.
