= Tachina barbata =

Scientific classification
- Kingdom: Animalia
- Phylum: Arthropoda
- Class: Insecta
- Order: Diptera
- Family: Tachinidae
- Genus: Tachina
- Species: T. barbata

Binomial name
- Tachina barbata (Zimin, 1984)

Species of fly

Tachina barbata is a species of fly in the genus Tachina of the family Tachinidae that is endemic to Russia.
