= Tachina virginea =

Scientific classification
- Kingdom: Animalia
- Phylum: Arthropoda
- Class: Insecta
- Order: Diptera
- Family: Tachinidae
- Genus: Tachina
- Species: T. virginea

Binomial name
- Tachina virginea (Meigen, 1838)

Species of fly

Tachina virginea is a species of fly in the genus Tachina of the family Tachinidae that is endemic to Europe.
