= Tachina zaqu =

Scientific classification
- Kingdom: Animalia
- Phylum: Arthropoda
- Class: Insecta
- Order: Diptera
- Family: Tachinidae
- Genus: Tachina
- Species: T. zaqu

Binomial name
- Tachina zaqu Chao & Arnaud, 1993

Species of fly

Tachina zaqu is a species of fly in the genus Tachina of the family Tachinidae that is endemic to Qinghai, province of China.
