= Tachina vernalis =

Scientific classification
- Kingdom: Animalia
- Phylum: Arthropoda
- Class: Insecta
- Order: Diptera
- Family: Tachinidae
- Genus: Tachina
- Species: T. vernalis

Binomial name
- Tachina vernalis (Robineau-Desvoidy, 1830)

Species of fly

Tachina vernalis is a species of fly in the genus Tachina of the family Tachinidae that is endemic to Europe, but was introduced to New England.
