= Tachina tahoensis =

Scientific classification
- Kingdom: Animalia
- Phylum: Arthropoda
- Class: Insecta
- Order: Diptera
- Family: Tachinidae
- Genus: Tachina
- Species: T. tahoensis

Binomial name
- Tachina tahoensis (Reinhard, 1938)

Species of fly

Tachina tahoensis is a species of fly in the genus Tachina of the family Tachinidae that can be found in British Columbia and US states such as Arizona and California.
