= Tachina calliphon =

Scientific classification
- Kingdom: Animalia
- Phylum: Arthropoda
- Clade: Pancrustacea
- Class: Insecta
- Order: Diptera
- Family: Tachinidae
- Genus: Tachina
- Species: T. calliphon

Binomial name
- Tachina calliphon (Walker, 1849)

Species of fly

Tachina calliphon is a species of fly in the genus Tachina of the family Tachinidae that is endemic to Australia.
