= Tachina tricincta =

Scientific classification
- Kingdom: Animalia
- Phylum: Arthropoda
- Class: Insecta
- Order: Diptera
- Family: Tachinidae
- Genus: Tachina
- Species: T. tricincta

Binomial name
- Tachina tricincta Meigen, 1824

Species of fly

Tachina tricincta is a species of fly in the genus Tachina of the family Tachinidae that is endemic to Austria.
