= Tachina brevirostris =

Scientific classification
- Kingdom: Animalia
- Phylum: Arthropoda
- Class: Insecta
- Order: Diptera
- Family: Tachinidae
- Genus: Tachina
- Species: T. brevirostris

Binomial name
- Tachina brevirostris (Tothill, 1924)

Synonyms
- Fabriciella brevirostris Tothill, 1924

Species of fly

Tachina brevirostris is a species of fly in the genus Tachina.

It is of the family Tachinidae, that can be found in Canada and the United States.
