= Tachina trianguli =

Scientific classification
- Kingdom: Animalia
- Phylum: Arthropoda
- Class: Insecta
- Order: Diptera
- Family: Tachinidae
- Genus: Tachina
- Species: T. trianguli

Binomial name
- Tachina trianguli (Walker, 1849)

Species of fly

Tachina trianguli is a species of fly in the genus Tachina of the family Tachinidae that is endemic to Venezuela.
