= Tachina tenebrifera =

Scientific classification
- Kingdom: Animalia
- Phylum: Arthropoda
- Class: Insecta
- Order: Diptera
- Family: Tachinidae
- Genus: Tachina
- Species: T. tenebrifera

Binomial name
- Tachina tenebrifera (Walker, 1853)

Species of fly

Tachina tenebrifera is a species of fly in the genus Tachina of the family Tachinidae that is endemic to Brazil.
