= Tachina breviceps =

Scientific classification
- Kingdom: Animalia
- Phylum: Arthropoda
- Class: Insecta
- Order: Diptera
- Family: Tachinidae
- Genus: Tachina
- Species: T. breviceps

Binomial name
- Tachina breviceps Zimin, 1929

Species of fly

Tachina brevicornis is a species of fly in the genus Tachina of the family Tachinidae that can be found in China, Japan, and Russia.
