= Tachina asiatica =

Scientific classification
- Kingdom: Animalia
- Phylum: Arthropoda
- Class: Insecta
- Order: Diptera
- Family: Tachinidae
- Genus: Tachina
- Species: T. asiatica

Binomial name
- Tachina asiatica (Tothill, 1918)

Species of fly

Tachina asiatica is a species of fly in the genus Tachina of the family Tachinidae that is endemic to India. It is found in such Indian provinces as Himachal Pradesh and Uttar Pradesh.
