= Mystacella solita =

Scientific classification
- Kingdom: Animalia
- Phylum: Arthropoda
- Class: Insecta
- Order: Diptera
- Family: Tachinidae
- Subfamily: Exoristinae
- Tribe: Goniini
- Genus: Mystacella
- Species: M. solita

Binomial name
- Mystacella solita Wulp, 1890

Species of fly

Mystacella solita is a species of bristle fly in the family Tachinidae.

== Distribution ==
Mexico
