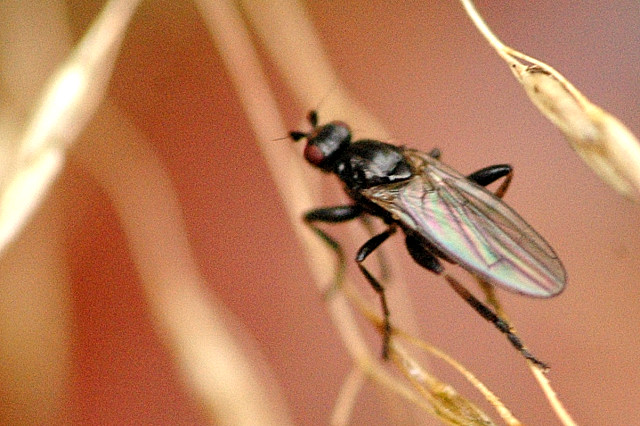
- Copromyza equina of the Copromyzinae

Scientific classification
- Kingdom: Animalia
- Phylum: Arthropoda
- Clade: Pancrustacea
- Class: Insecta
- Order: Diptera
- Family: Sphaeroceridae
- Subfamily: Copromyzinae
- Genus: Copromyza; Duda, 1923

Type species
- Borborus uncinatus Duda, 1921

= Copromyza =

Genus of flies

Copromyza is a genus of flies belonging to the family Sphaeroceridae.

== Species ==
- C. borealis Zetterstedt, 1847
- C. equina Fallén, 1820
- C. hackarsi (Vanschuytbroeck, 1948)
- C. montana Rohček, 1992
- C. neglecta (Malloch, 1913)
- C. nigrina (Gimmerthal, 1847)
- C. pappi Norrbom & Kim, 1985
- C. pedipicta Richards, 1959
- C. pseudostercoraria Papp, 1976
- C. stercoraria (Meigen, 1830)
- C. zhongensis Norrbom & Kim, 1985
