= Tachina corsicana =

Scientific classification
- Kingdom: Animalia
- Phylum: Arthropoda
- Class: Insecta
- Order: Diptera
- Family: Tachinidae
- Genus: Tachina
- Species: T. corsicana

Binomial name
- Tachina corsicana (Villeneuve, 1931)

Species of fly

Tachina corsicana is a species of fly in the genus Tachina of the family Tachinidae that can be found in Bulgaria, Greece, the islands of Corsica and Sardinia, as well as parts of Northern Africa, including Algeria.
