= Mystacella frontalis =

Scientific classification
- Kingdom: Animalia
- Phylum: Arthropoda
- Class: Insecta
- Order: Diptera
- Family: Tachinidae
- Subfamily: Exoristinae
- Tribe: Goniini
- Genus: Mystacella
- Species: M. frontalis

Binomial name
- Mystacella frontalis (Townsend, 1915)

Synonyms
- Macromeigenia owenii Reinhard, 1930; Organomyia frontalis Townsend, 1915

Species of fly

Mystacella frontalis is a species of bristle fly in the family Tachinidae.

== Distribution ==
United States.
