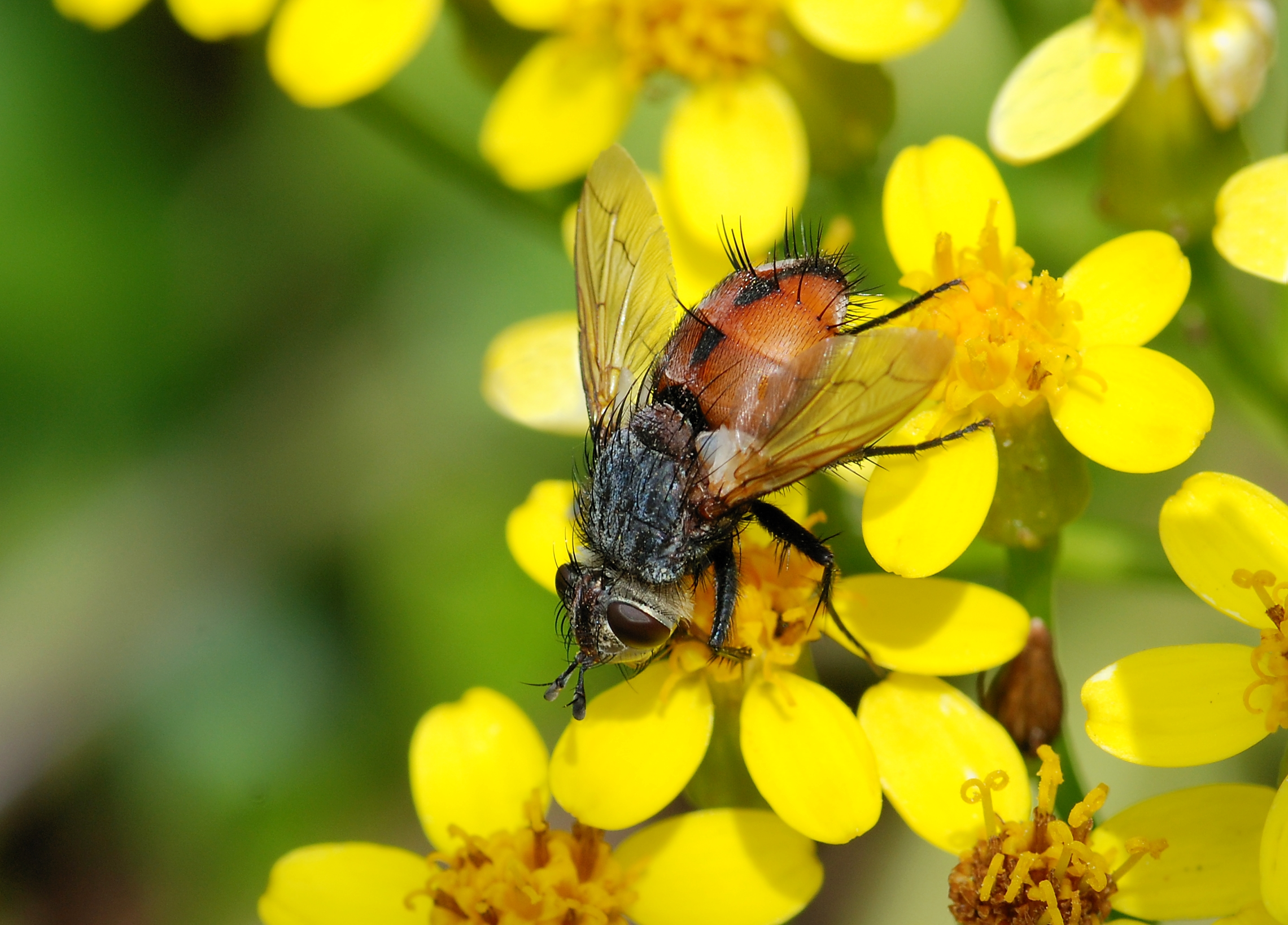

Scientific classification
- Kingdom: Animalia
- Phylum: Arthropoda
- Clade: Pancrustacea
- Class: Insecta
- Order: Diptera
- Family: Tachinidae
- Genus: Tachina
- Species: T. praeceps

Binomial name
- Tachina praeceps (Zetterstedt, 1824)

= Tachina praeceps =

Species of fly

Tachina praeceps is a species of fly in the genus Tachina of the family Tachinidae that can be found in such European countries as Austria, Bulgaria, Czech Republic, France, Germany, Greece (including Crete), Hungary, Italy, Malta, Moldova, Poland, Romania, Russia, Slovakia, Spain,Sweden, Switzerland, Ukraine, and all states of former Yugoslavia (except for Bosnia and Herzegovina).
