= Tachina chrysocephala =

Scientific classification
- Kingdom: Animalia
- Phylum: Arthropoda
- Class: Insecta
- Order: Diptera
- Family: Tachinidae
- Genus: Tachina
- Species: T. chrysocephala

Binomial name
- Tachina chrysocephala (Walker, 1836)

Species of fly

Tachina chaetaria is a species of fly in the genus Tachina of the family Tachinidae that is endemic to South America.
