= Tachina bombylia =

Scientific classification
- Kingdom: Animalia
- Phylum: Arthropoda
- Class: Insecta
- Order: Diptera
- Family: Tachinidae
- Genus: Tachina
- Species: T. bombylia

Binomial name
- Tachina bombylia (Villeneuve, 1936)

Synonyms
- Servillia bombylia Villeneuve, 1936

Species of fly

Tachina bombylia is a species of fly in the genus Tachina of the family Tachinidae that is endemic to China.
