= Tachina corylana =

Scientific classification
- Kingdom: Animalia
- Phylum: Arthropoda
- Class: Insecta
- Order: Diptera
- Family: Tachinidae
- Genus: Tachina
- Species: T. corylana

Binomial name
- Tachina corylana Gimmerthal, 1834

Species of fly

Tachina corylana is a species of fly in the genus Tachina of the family Tachinidae that is endemic to Latvia.
