= Tachina discifera =

Scientific classification
- Kingdom: Animalia
- Phylum: Arthropoda
- Class: Insecta
- Order: Diptera
- Family: Tachinidae
- Genus: Tachina
- Species: T. discifera

Binomial name
- Tachina discifera Walker, 1860

Species of fly

Tachina discifera is a species of fly in the genus Tachina of the family Tachinidae that is endemic to Maluku province of Indonesia.
