= Tachina xizangensis =

Scientific classification
- Kingdom: Animalia
- Phylum: Arthropoda
- Class: Insecta
- Order: Diptera
- Family: Tachinidae
- Genus: Tachina
- Species: T. xizangensis

Binomial name
- Tachina xizangensis (Chao, 1982)

Species of fly

Tachina xizangensis is a species of fly in the genus Tachina of the family Tachinidae that is endemic to China.
