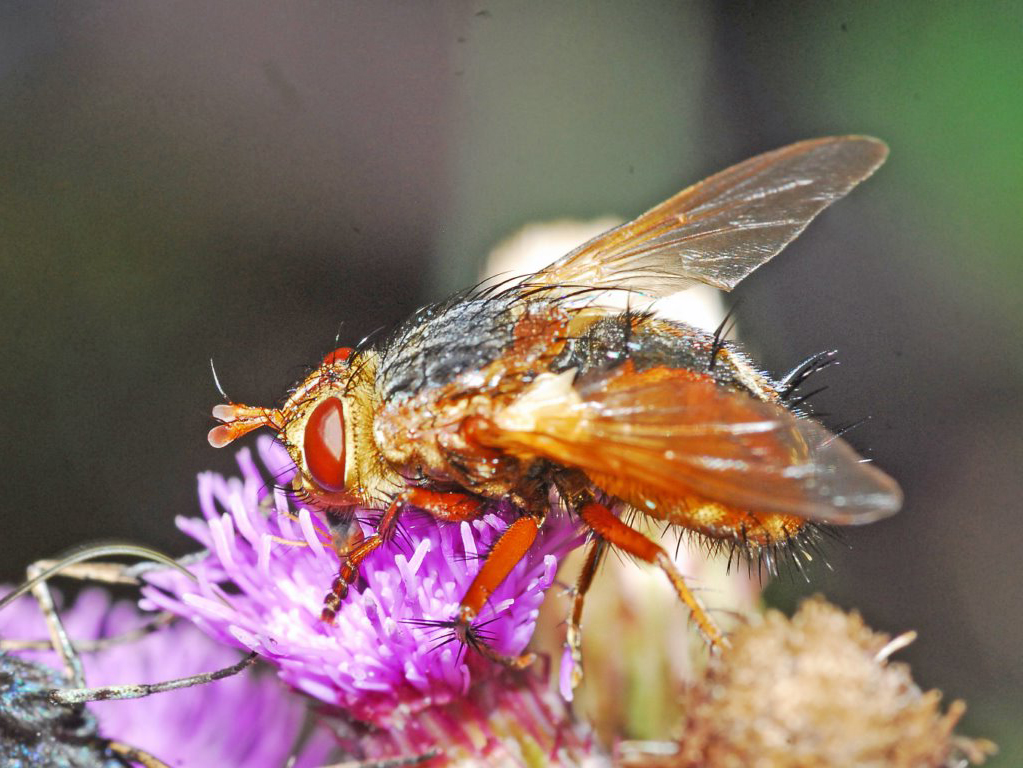
- Tachina casta. Female

Scientific classification
- Kingdom: Animalia
- Phylum: Arthropoda
- Class: Insecta
- Order: Diptera
- Family: Tachinidae
- Genus: Tachina
- Species: T. casta

Binomial name
- Tachina casta (Rondani, 1859)

= Tachina casta =

Species of fly

Tachina casta is a species of fly in the genus Tachina of the family Tachinidae.

== Distribution ==
This species can be found in such European countries as Bulgaria, Croatia, France, Greece, Italy, (including Sicily), North Macedonia, and Spain.

== Description ==
Tachina casta can reach a body length of about 15 mm (0.59 in). These flies are red or orange fire coloured, including antennae. Femurs, tibiae and tarsi are yellow-orange. The back of the abdomen has a black longitudinal median band ending in a point at tergite tergite 5. The lateral sector of the scutum and the post-pronotum are black. Post-pronotal (humerus), post-alar callus, lateral margins of the scutum, and pleural sclerites of the thorax are entirely or mostly orange-red. They show 2 intra-alar postsutural setae, 4-8 marginal bristles on tergite 3 and 18-30 bristles on tergite 4.

== Biology ==
Adults of Tachina casta feed on pollen. Their larvae are parasites of larvae of other insects, usually moths. They lay eggs on plants and the larvae move in the hope of finding a caterpillar and piercing its skin. If they succeed, they will feed on it and will pupate. Consequently, they are good regulators of larvae of some species of moths, that seriously harm some plants.
