= Tachina anguisipennis =

Scientific classification
- Kingdom: Animalia
- Phylum: Arthropoda
- Class: Insecta
- Order: Diptera
- Family: Tachinidae
- Genus: Tachina
- Species: T. anguisipennis

Binomial name
- Tachina anguisipennis Chao, 1987

Species of fly

Tachina anguisipennis is a species of fly in the family Tachinidae. It is endemic to China.
