= Tachina testaceifrons =

Scientific classification
- Kingdom: Animalia
- Phylum: Arthropoda
- Class: Insecta
- Order: Diptera
- Family: Tachinidae
- Genus: Tachina
- Species: T. testaceifrons

Binomial name
- Tachina testaceifrons Roser, 1840

Species of fly

Tachina testaceifrons is a species of fly in the genus Tachina of the family Tachinidae that is endemic to Germany.
