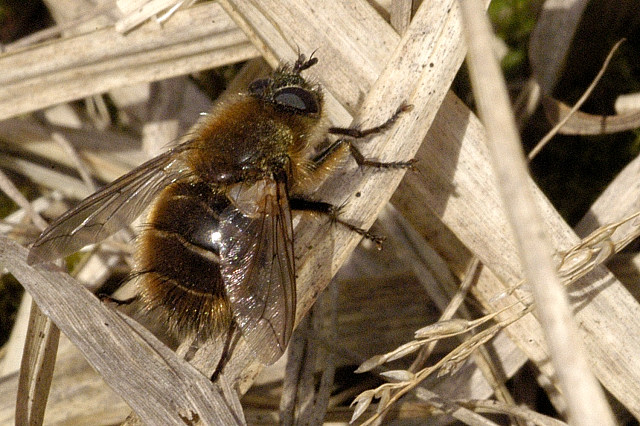

Scientific classification
- Kingdom: Animalia
- Phylum: Arthropoda
- Class: Insecta
- Order: Diptera
- Family: Tachinidae
- Genus: Tachina
- Species: T. ursina

Binomial name
- Tachina ursina (Meigen, 1824)

Synonyms
- Musca ursina Meigen, 1824

= Tachina ursina =

Species of fly

Tachina ursina is a species of fly in the genus Tachina of the family Tachinidae that can be found in such European countries as Austria, Benelux, Czech Republic, France, Germany, Hungary, Italy, Poland, Romania, Scandinavia, Spain, Switzerland, the United Kingdom and Ukraine.
