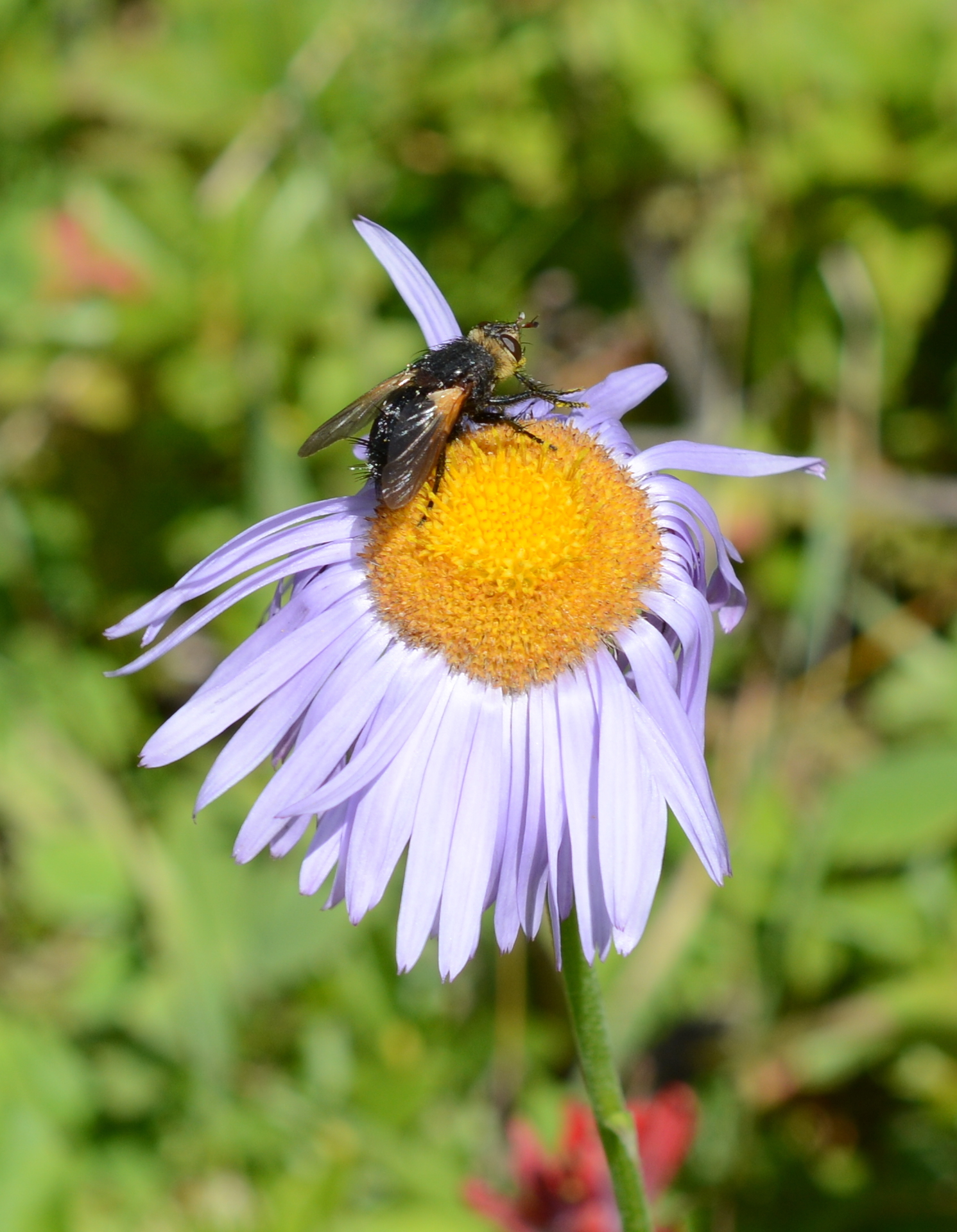

Scientific classification
- Kingdom: Animalia
- Phylum: Arthropoda
- Class: Insecta
- Order: Diptera
- Family: Tachinidae
- Genus: Tachina
- Species: T. latianulum

Binomial name
- Tachina latianulum (Tothill, 1924)

Synonyms
- Fabriciella latianulum Tothill, 1924

= Tachina latianulum =

Species of fly

Tachina latianulum is a species in the family Tachinidae ("bristle flies"), in the order Diptera ("flies"). Tachina latianulum is found in North America.
