= Pseudogonia parisiaca =

Scientific classification
- Kingdom: Animalia
- Phylum: Arthropoda
- Class: Insecta
- Order: Diptera
- Family: Tachinidae
- Subfamily: Exoristinae
- Tribe: Goniini
- Genus: Pseudogonia
- Species: P. parisiaca

Binomial name
- Pseudogonia parisiaca (Robineau-Desvoidy, 1851)

Synonyms
- Gonia cognata Rondani, 1859; Isomera parisiaca Robineau-Desvoidy, 1851

Species of fly

Pseudogonia parisiaca is a genus of flies in the family Tachinidae.

== Distribution ==
Hungary, Moldova, Romania, Slovakia, Ukraine, Bulgaria, Corse, Croatia, Greece, Italy, Serbia, Spain, Austria, France, Switzerland, Kazakhstan, Russia, China, Transcaucasia.
