= Tachina terminalis =

Scientific classification
- Kingdom: Animalia
- Phylum: Arthropoda
- Class: Insecta
- Order: Diptera
- Family: Tachinidae
- Genus: Tachina
- Species: T. terminalis

Binomial name
- Tachina terminalis (Meigen, 1824)

Species of fly

Tachina terminalis is a species of fly in the genus Tachina of the family Tachinidae that is endemic to Europe.
