= Tachina compressa =

Scientific classification
- Kingdom: Animalia
- Phylum: Arthropoda
- Class: Insecta
- Order: Diptera
- Family: Tachinidae
- Genus: Tachina
- Species: T. compressa

Binomial name
- Tachina compressa (Tothill 1924)

Synonyms
- Fabriciella compressa

Species of fly

Tachina compressa is a species of fly in the genus Tachina of the family Tachinidae that can be found in such US states as California, Oregon, and Washington.
