= Tachina zimini =

Scientific classification
- Kingdom: Animalia
- Phylum: Arthropoda
- Class: Insecta
- Order: Diptera
- Family: Tachinidae
- Genus: Tachina
- Species: T. zimini

Binomial name
- Tachina zimini Chao, 1962

Species of fly

Tachina zimini is a species of fly in the genus Tachina of the family Tachinidae that is endemic to China.
