= Solieria testacea =

Scientific classification
- Kingdom: Animalia
- Phylum: Arthropoda
- Class: Insecta
- Order: Diptera
- Family: Tachinidae
- Subfamily: Tachininae
- Tribe: Leskiini
- Genus: Solieria
- Species: S. testacea

Binomial name
- Solieria testacea (Robineau-Desvoidy, 1830)

Species of fly

Solieria testacea is a species of fly in the family Tachinidae. This species is often considered Nomen dubium.

== Distribution ==
France.
