= Pseudogonia rufifrons =

Scientific classification
- Kingdom: Animalia
- Phylum: Arthropoda
- Class: Insecta
- Order: Diptera
- Family: Tachinidae
- Subfamily: Exoristinae
- Tribe: Goniini
- Genus: Pseudogonia
- Species: P. rufifrons

Binomial name
- Pseudogonia rufifrons (Wiedemann, 1830)

Synonyms
- Tachina rufifrons Wiedemann, 1830; Gaediogonia jacobsoni Townsend, 1927; Gonia cinerascens Rondani, 1859; Gonia exigua Doleschall, 1858; Gonia javana Macquart, 1848; Gonia minuta Wulp, 1881; Gonia munroi Curran, 1927; Gonia ritchiei Cuthbertson & Munro, 1941; Latreillia lalandii Robineau-Desvoidy, 1830

Species of fly

Pseudogonia rufifrons is a genus of flies in the family Tachinidae.

== Distribution ==
Tajikistan, Turkmenistan, Uzbekistan, Czech Republic, Hungary, Poland, Romania, Slovakia, Ukraine, Bulgaria, Corsica, Croatia, Greece, Italy, Malta, Portugal, Serbia, Spain, Turkey, Austria, France, Germany, Switzerland, Japan, Kazakhstan, South Korea, Iran, Israel, Palestine, Mongolia, Egypt, Morocco, Russia, Transcaucasia, Cape Verde, Nigeria, South Africa, Tanzania, United Arab Emirates, Yemen, China, India, Java, Sumatra, Japan, Malaysia, Myanmar, Pakistan, Philippines, Taiwan, Thailand, Australia, Hawaii, Indonesia, Papua New Guinea, Solomon Islands, Hawaii
