= Mystacella chrysoprocta =

Scientific classification
- Kingdom: Animalia
- Phylum: Arthropoda
- Class: Insecta
- Order: Diptera
- Family: Tachinidae
- Subfamily: Exoristinae
- Tribe: Goniini
- Genus: Mystacella
- Species: M. chrysoprocta

Binomial name
- Mystacella chrysoprocta (Wiedemann, 1830)

Synonyms
- Tachina chrysoprocta Wiedemann, 1830; Tachina interrupta Walker, 1853

Species of fly

Mystacella chrysoprocta is a species of bristle fly in the family Tachinidae.

== Distribution ==
Canada, United States, Mexico.
