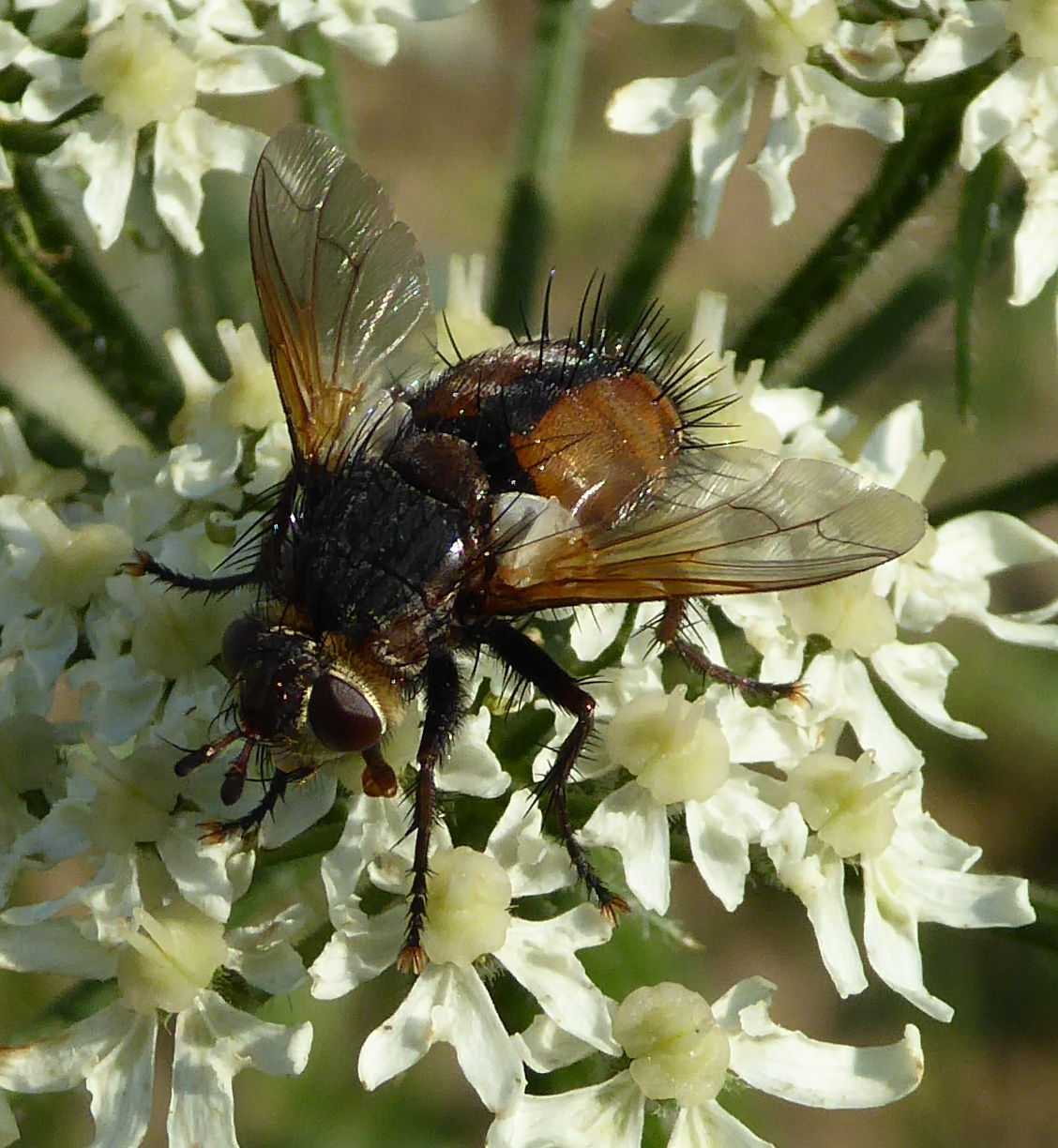

Scientific classification
- Kingdom: Animalia
- Phylum: Arthropoda
- Class: Insecta
- Order: Diptera
- Family: Tachinidae
- Genus: Tachina
- Species: T. magnicornis

Binomial name
- Tachina magnicornis (Zetterstedt, 1844)

Synonyms
- Echinomya magnicornis

= Tachina magnicornis =

Species of fly

Tachina magnicornis is a species of fly in the genus Tachina of the family Tachinidae that can be found almost everywhere in Europe, except for Belarus, Ireland, Liechtenstein, Luxembourg, Monaco, San Marino, Vatican City, and various European islands. It is a parasitoid of Noctuidae and some Lasiocampidae caterpillars.
