= Benjamin August Gimmerthal =

German entomologist

Benjamin August Gimmerthal (1779, Zittau- 1848, Riga (then Russian Empire)) was a German entomologist who specialised in Diptera. His collection of Chloropidae is held by the Museum of Systematic Zoology, University of Latvia, Riga. The remaining Diptera and other insects by the Natural History Museum of Latvia (Homepage)

== Works ==
partial list

- Gimmerthal B.A. (1842). Uebersicht der Zweifluegler (Diptera Ln) Lief- und Kurlands. Bulletin de la Société des naturalistes de Moscou 15: 639-659.
- Gimmerthal, B.A. (1845) Erster Beitrag zu einer Künftig zu Bearbeitenden Dipterologie Russlands. Bulletin de la Société Impériale des Naturalistes de Moscou 18, 287–331.
- Gimmerthal B.A. (1847). Vierter Beitrag zur Dipterologie Russlands Bulletin de la Société des naturalistes de Moscou 20: 140-208.
