= Religion in the Canary Islands =

Religion in the Canary Islands (2019)
1. Catholicism (76.7%)
2. Atheism (8.10%)
3. Agnosticism (6.30%)
4. Indifferent/Non-believer (5.80%)
5. Other religions (2.80%)
6. Unanswered (0.30%)

As in the rest of Spain, the majority religion in the Canary Islands is the Catholic Church. The Catholic religion has been the majority since the Conquest of the Canary Islands in the fifteenth century. This religion would largely replace the Canarian aboriginal religion through the prohibition of the latter and syncretism. According to a survey conducted in 2019, Canary Islands is the fifth autonomous community in Spain with the highest percentage of people who declare themselves to be Catholics after the Region of Murcia, Extremadura, Galicia, Aragon, and Castile and León. 76.7% of the population is Catholic.

In the Canary Islands there are also minorities of other religions, such as Islam, Evangelical Churches, Hinduism, Afro-American religion, Chinese Religions, Buddhism, Baháʼí Faith and Judaism, as well as the existence in the archipelago of a form of autochthonous neo-paganism, the Church of the Guanche People. The Canary Islands is currently one of the regions with the greatest religious diversity in Spain and Europe.

== Religious self-definition ==
According to a Metroscopy survey of 2011, which conducts social studies:

- 77% of the Canaries consider themselves believers in any of the religions
- 19% are atheists
- Of the respondents, 71% of the islanders identify with some religion
- 28% do not identify with any religion

Therefore, there is a 6% difference between people who identify with some religion and those who believe in some divinity.

According to the Autonomous Barometer of the CIS, the distribution of beliefs in 2019 was as follows:

76.7%	Catholics
5.8%	Non-believers
8.1%	Atheists
6.3%	Agnostics
2.8%	Other religions

== Canarian aboriginal religion ==
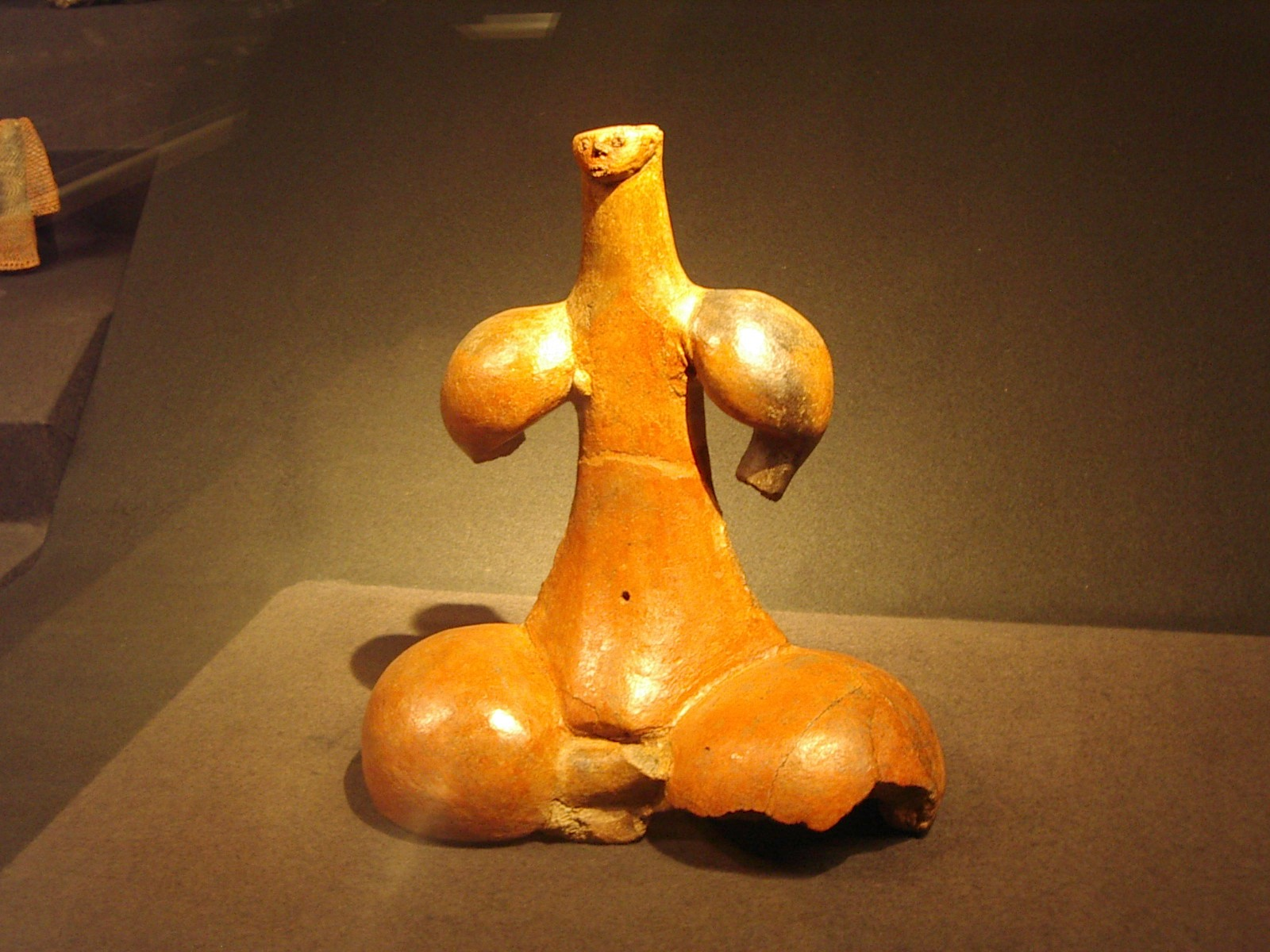
Idol of Tara, in Museo Canario of Las Palmas de Gran Canaria: possibly represents a divinity of fertility.

The original religion practiced by the native or aboriginal peoples of the archipelago (Guanches) was a belief of animistic and polytheistic type, with a strong presence of astral cult.

This religiosity sacralized certain places, mainly rock and mountains, such as the volcano Teide in Tenerife, the Idafe Rock in La Palma, the Bentayga Rock in Gran Canaria or the mountain of Tindaya in Fuerteventura. They also held sacred the trees, among which the drago and the pine stand out. There was a pantheon of different gods and ancestral spirits; among the main gods for example of the island of Tenerife, we could highlight: Achamán (god of heaven and supreme creator), Chaxiraxi (mother goddess later identified with the Virgin of Candelaria), Magec (god of the sun) and Guayota (the demon) among many other gods and ancestral spirits. Also practiced was the cult of the dead and the mummification of corpses, as on the island of Tenerife where it reached greater perfection. They also fashioned clay or stone idols.

== Catholicism ==
The Christianization of the Canary Islands is linked to the process of conquest, although the presence of Christian elements in the archipelago dates back at least a century before its incorporation into the Crown of Castile.

The first news that speaks of the introduction of Christianity in the islands dates from 1351, the year Pope Clement VI created the Bishopric of the Islands of Fortune or Bishopric of Telde on the island of Gran Canaria. The Bishopric of Telde was basically a project of evangelization of the Canary Islands by Mallorcan and Catalan missionaries, which failed because of raids by European pirates which angered the natives. This situation led to the martyrdom of thirteen Catalan hermit missionaries who were thrown by the aborigines to the abyss of Jinámar in 1393.

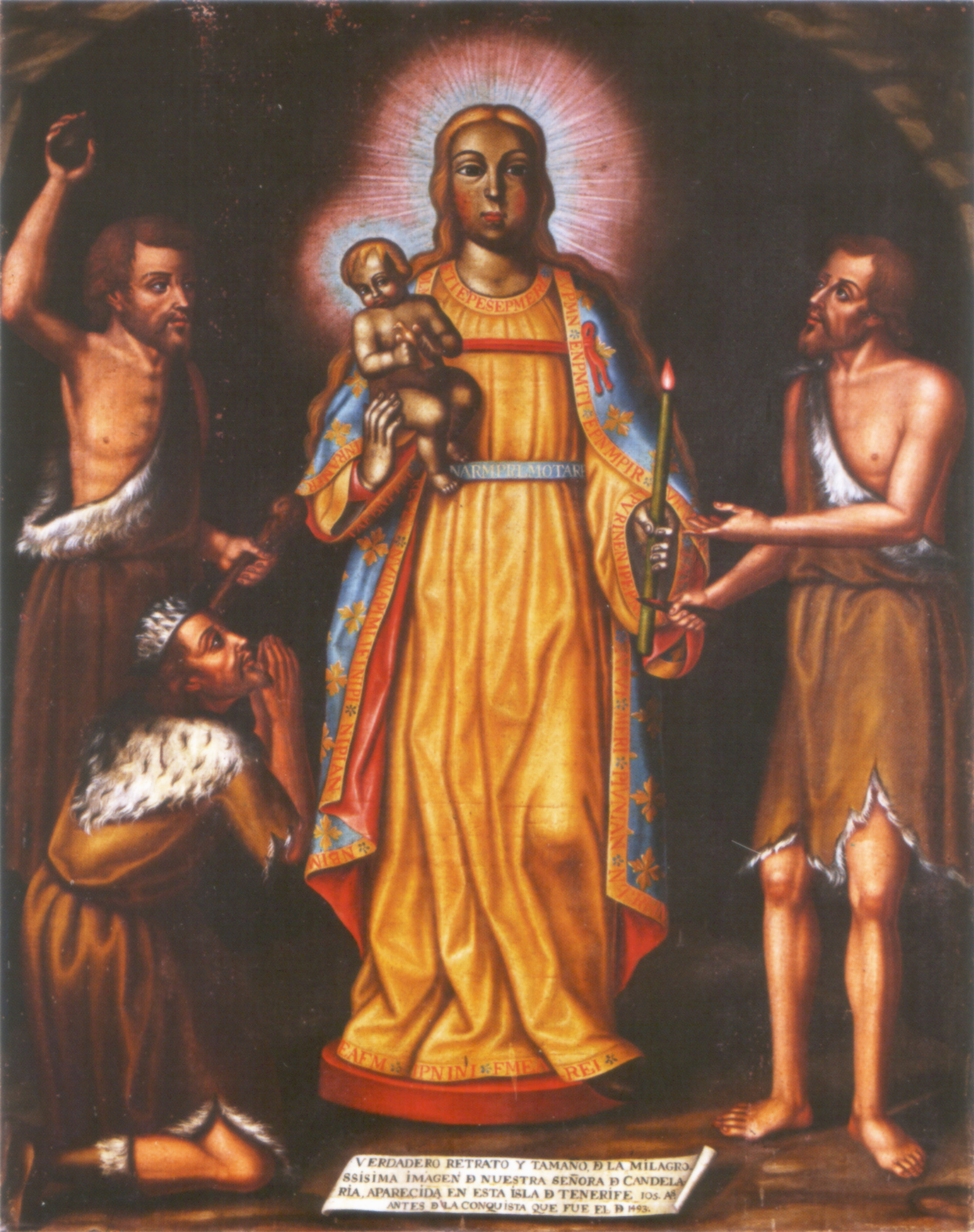
18th-century painting depicting the Virgin of Candelaria between two Guanche shepherds and the mencey Acaimo of Güímar. The original image of this Virgin was found by the Guanches on the beaches of Tenerife; probably the Christian missionaries would have taken it there.

Later the Norman conquerors Jean de Béthencourt and Gadifer de la Salle arrived on the island of Lanzarote. After the conquest of the island in 1402 a small church or hermitage was established in the Rubicon Castle, which later acquired the title of cathedral by papal concession, dedicated to Saint Martial. The Antipope Benedict XIII in a bull issued on July 7, 1404, created the Diocese of San Marcial del Rubicón. Thereafter, aboriginal leaders subdued on the islands of Lanzarote, Fuerteventura, La Gomera and El Hierro were baptized along with their followers.

In 1424, Pope Martin V erected in Betancuria the Bishopric of Fuerteventura, which encompassed all the Canary Islands except the island of Lanzarote. This bishopric was abolished in 1431, just seven years after it was created.

In the mid-fifteenth century there is evidence of the presence of Christian missionaries in the western Canary Islands, because around 1450 in the area of the modern municipality of Candelaria in Tenerife a hermitage is found consisting of three friars led by friar Alfonso de Bolaños, considered the "Apostle of Tenerife". These religious lived among the Guanches, speaking their language and baptizing many of them. This mission would last until near the beginning of the conquest of this island. It is at this time when most researchers locate the finding of the image of the Virgin of Candelaria by the Guanches of Tenerife and the Virgin of the Snows by aborigines of the island of La Palma, both possibly carried to these islands by Mallorcan or Catalan missionaries. The Virgin of Candelaria would enjoy a considerable religious and cultural importance in the archipelago, to the point that in 1599 she was declared Patron Saint of the Canary Islands by Pope Clement VIII, a title ratified in 1867 by Pius IX.

In 1485, after the conquest of Gran Canaria, Pope Innocent VIII definitively authorized the transfer of the diocesan seat from San Marcial del Rubicón to Las Palmas. The name of the diocese was changed to be called Diocese Canariense-Rubicense, making reference to the island where its headquarters would be from that moment, that is, Gran Canaria, but retaining in its name its origin, the Rubicón.

From here the Christianization of the islands of La Palma and Tenerife would begin. The Christianization of the Canary Islands was quick and complete. Insular Catholicism has given two saints to the Church up to the present: José de Anchieta (1534-1597) and Peter of Saint Joseph de Betancur (1626-1667). Both, born on the island of Tenerife, were missionaries respectively in Brazil and Guatemala.

In the nineteenth century a new bishopric was founded in the Canary Islands, the Diocese of San Cristobal de La Laguna in 1819. Although the origins of creating a diocese based in Tenerife began shortly after the conquest of the Canary Islands, it was the same Alonso Fernández de Lugo (conqueror of this island) who in 1513 asked the Court to erect a new diocese on the island of Tenerife. However, this project would always have the opposition of the Grancanarian bishop. From 1819, the Canary Islands was divided into two dioceses: The Diocese Canariense-Rubicense that encompasses the eastern islands (Gran Canaria, Fuerteventura and Lanzarote) and the Diocese of San Cristóbal of La Laguna or Nivariense that encompasses the western islands (Tenerife, La Gomera, La Palma and El Hierro).

In the Canary Islands, religious devotions of great tradition in history and culture are particularly important, such as the Virgin of Candelaria and the Christ of La Laguna in Tenerife, the Virgin of the Pine in Gran Canaria, the Virgin of the Snows in La Palma, the Virgin of La Peña in Fuerteventura, the Virgin of Guadalupe in La Gomera, the Our Lady of Dolours in Lanzarote, and the Virgin of the Kings in El Hierro. Many of the Canarian festivities have a Catholic religious background, such as the romerias and the tradition of the bajadas of some images of the island patrons worshiped in the archipelago.

Between June 11 and 12, 2026, Pope Leo XIV visited the Canary Islands, specifically Gran Canaria and Tenerife, as part of his apostolic journey to Spain. This marked the first papal visit to the archipelago in history. The visit focused on migration.

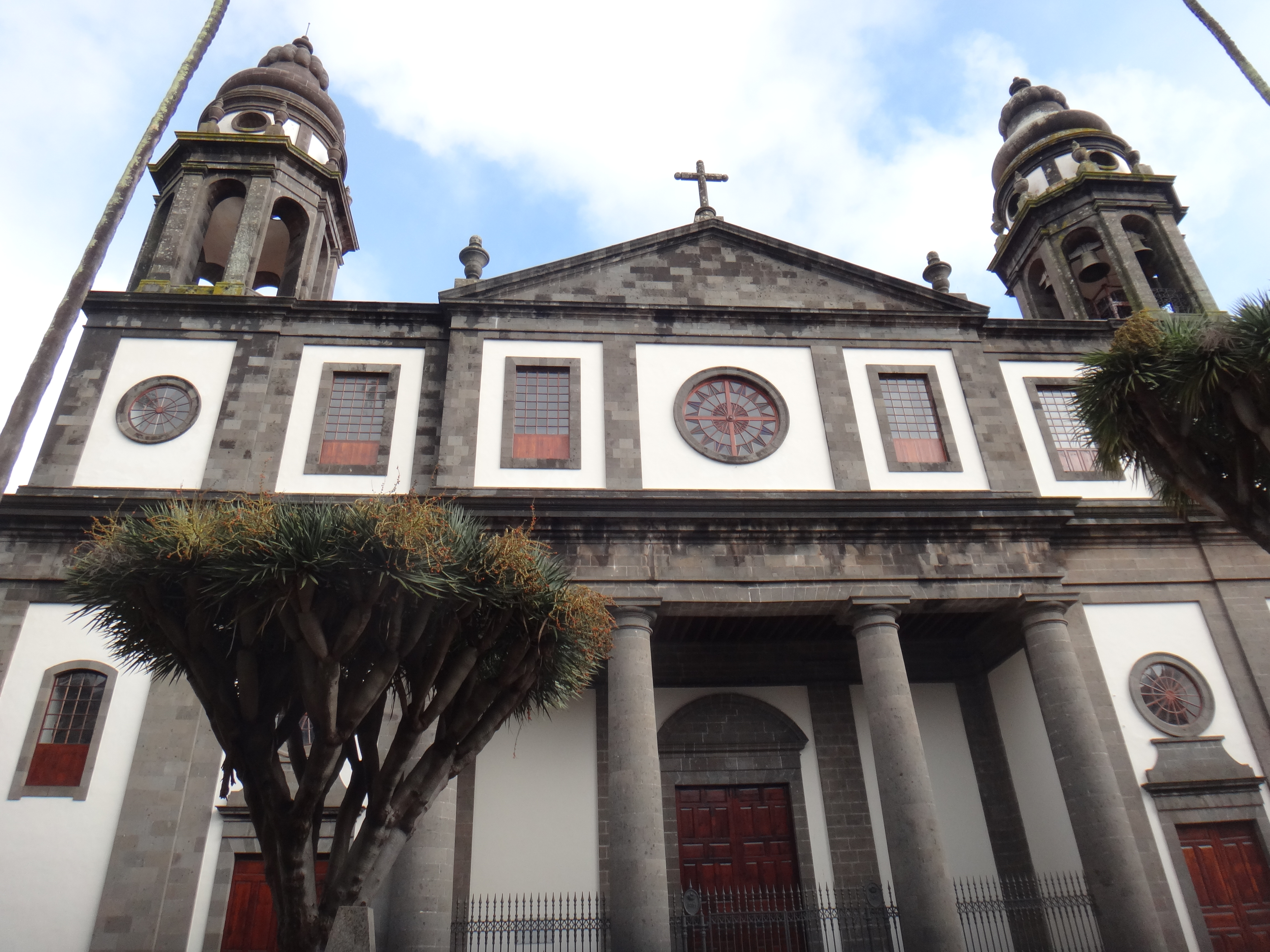
La Laguna Cathedral, seat of the Roman Catholic Diocese of San Cristóbal de La Laguna.

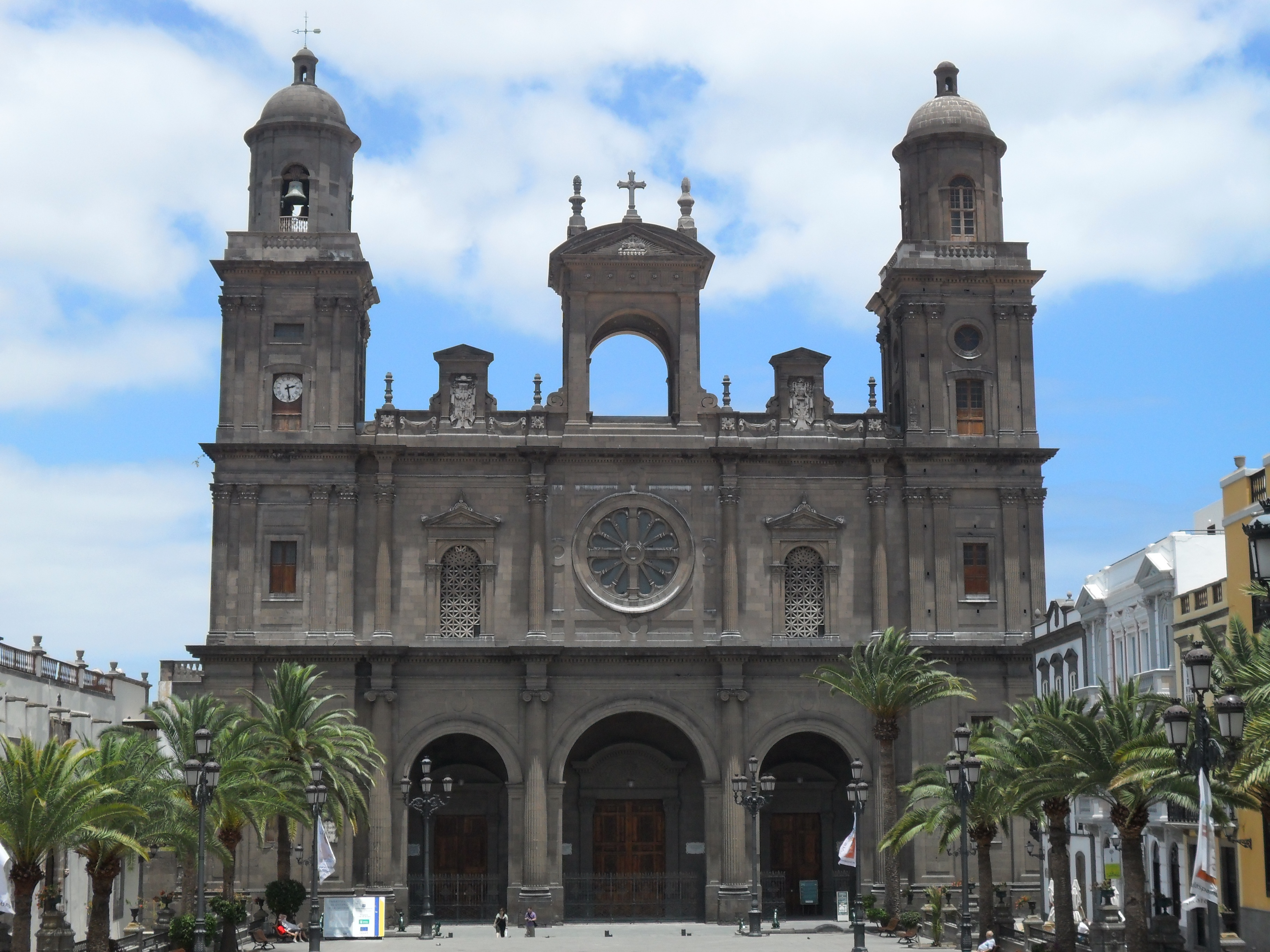
Las Palmas Cathedral, seat of the Roman Catholic Diocese of Canarias.

== Other religions ==
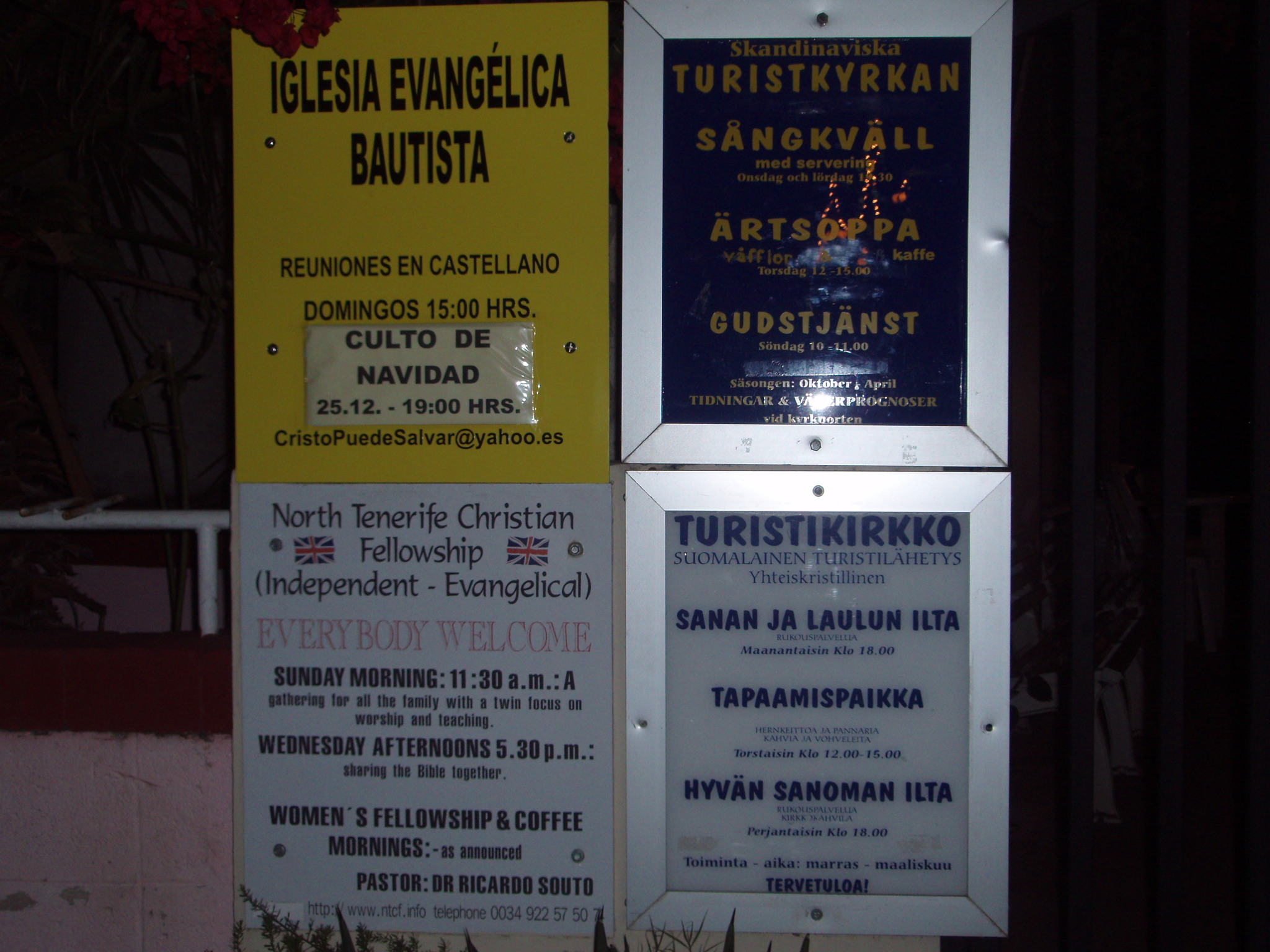
Churches in Tenerife advertising 2008

The strategic situation of the archipelago on the commercial routes and its condition as a bridge of union between Europe, Africa and America motivated the establishment in the islands of merchants and missions of various religions, including Jews and Protestants.

=== Other Christian denominations ===
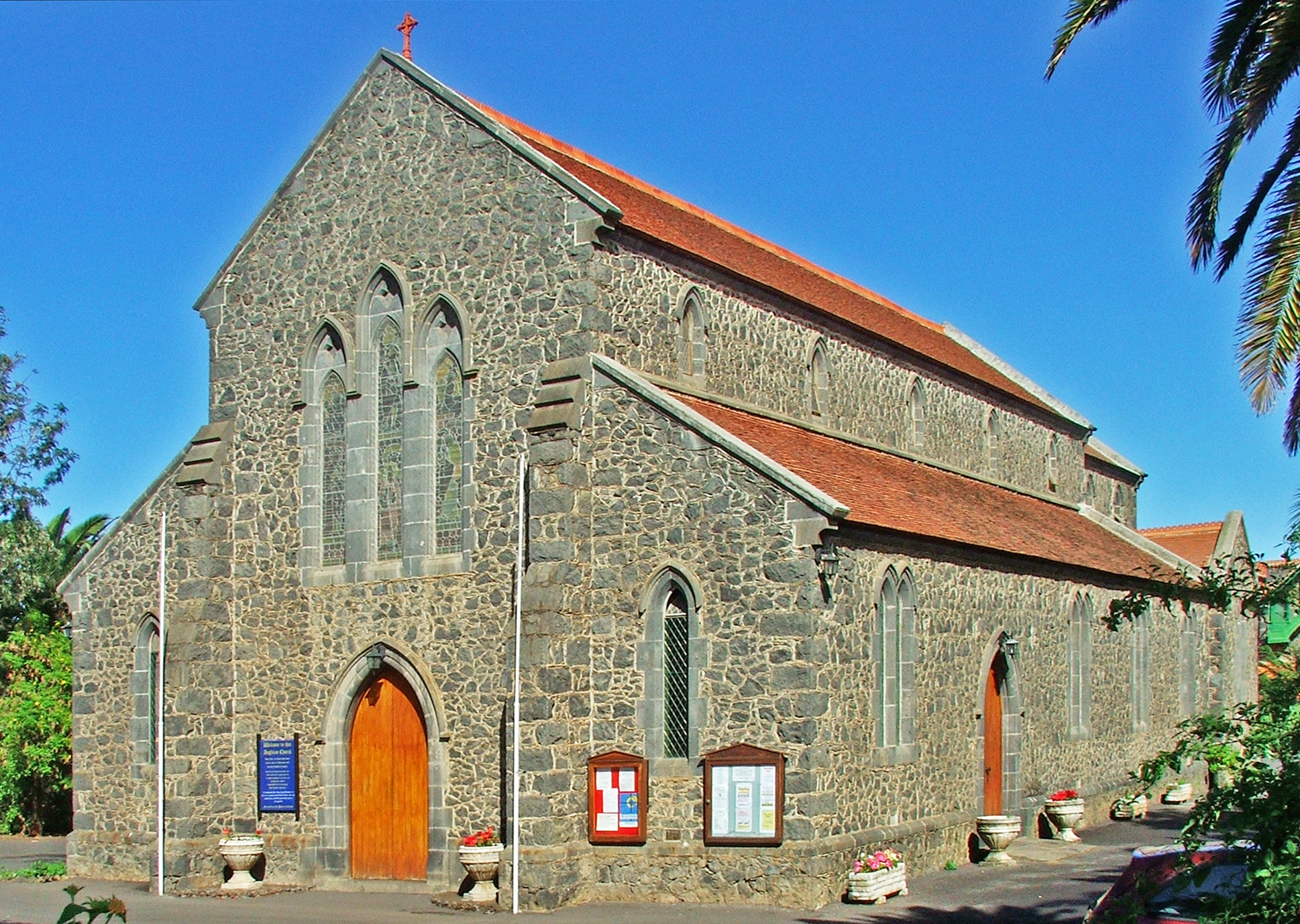
All Saints' Church, Puerto de la Cruz (Tenerife). It was the first Anglican church built in the Canary Islands.

The presence of Anglican communities in the archipelago dates back to the late sixteenth century, although growth was slow until the nineteenth century. The first Anglican communities in the Canary Islands were established in the cities of Puerto de la Cruz, Santa Cruz de Tenerife, Las Palmas de Gran Canaria and to a lesser extent in Santa Cruz de La Palma.

In the city of Puerto de la Cruz in the north of the island of Tenerife would be built at the end of the nineteenth century the first Anglican church in the Canaries, the Church of All Saints. In addition, this city also has the oldest Anglican cemetery in the archipelago. Later, others were built, such as the Anglican Chapel of Las Palmas de Gran Canaria and the Church of San Jorge in Santa Cruz de Tenerife (today a Catholic church).

Regarding Evangelicalism, the majority of Evangelical churches in the Canary Islands were built in the second half of the 20th century, among which the following stand out: The Assembly of God, the Philadelphia Church of God, the Pentecostal Church, the Baptists, the Body Church of Christ, and the Salvation Army. The Evangelical Council of the Canary Islands is the federation that brings together the majority of the various evangelical churches existing in the archipelago. There are also national churches of the Scandinavian countries such as the Church of Sweden, the Church of Norway, the German Evangelical Church and the Evangelical Lutheran Church of Finland.

The Eastern Orthodox Church is also present, although it is the Christian community that has most recently established itself in the archipelago, mostly at the beginning of the 21st century, including the Russian Orthodox Church, the Romanian Orthodox Church, and the new Orthodox Church of the Canary Islands which is a small community within the Spanish Orthodox Church under the jurisdiction of the Serbian Orthodox Church and in communion with the universal Orthodox Church. Its headquarters is in Puerto de la Cruz in Tenerife.

There are also communities of Jehovah's Witnesses and the Church of Jesus Christ of Latter-day Saints, of which there are 3,300 members in the Canary Islands. On the island of Tenerife there are three Latter-day Saint centers: in Santa Cruz de Tenerife, Los Cristianos and San Cristóbal de La Laguna; the latter is the only one in the Canary Islands built expressly as such. On the island of Gran Canaria there are three other centers: Las Palmas de Gran Canaria, Telde, and Vecindario. On other islands there are one on the island of Fuerteventura in Puerto del Rosario and one on the island of Lanzarote in Arrecife. There is also a small group on the island of La Palma.

=== Islam ===
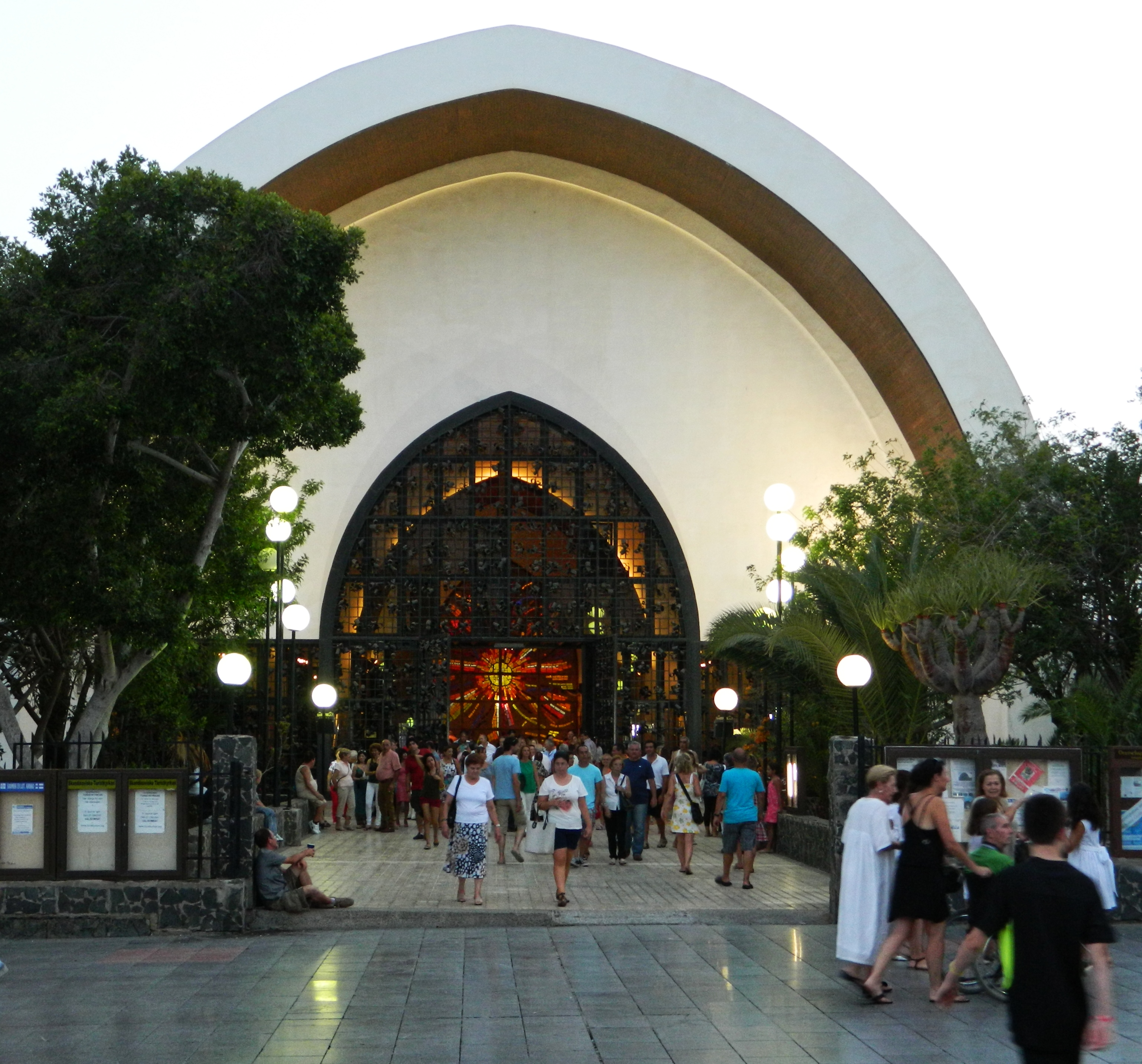
Ecumenical Templo in Playa del Inglés (Gran Canaria).

Islam is currently the second religion most practiced in the archipelago after Catholicism. In 2022, there are 80.171 Muslims in the Canary Islands.

The Muslim communities were definitively established in the Canary Islands on Tenerife and Gran Canaria between the 19th and 20th centuries, later on Fuerteventura and Lanzarote, and still later on La Palma.

Currently, the Islamic Federation of the Canary Islands is the religious organization that brings together the associations and communities of the Canarian archipelago.

=== Judaism ===
Judaism came to the Canary Islands in the 15th century with the conquest, from the converted Jews who moved from the Iberian Peninsula and who would continue practicing their ancient religion in secret. Originally, the Canarian Jews resided mainly on the islands of Tenerife and La Palma. The mother of the future Catholic saint, José de Anchieta, a missionary in Brazil born in San Cristobal de La Laguna, Tenerife, was a descendant of Jewish converts.

Just as in the rest of Spain, the Jews would suffer persecution from the Holy Inquisition, although to a much lesser extent than in the Iberian Peninsula. The current community of Sephardic exile origin in the Canary Islands began to settle in the islands in the middle of the 20th century.

=== Oriental religions ===
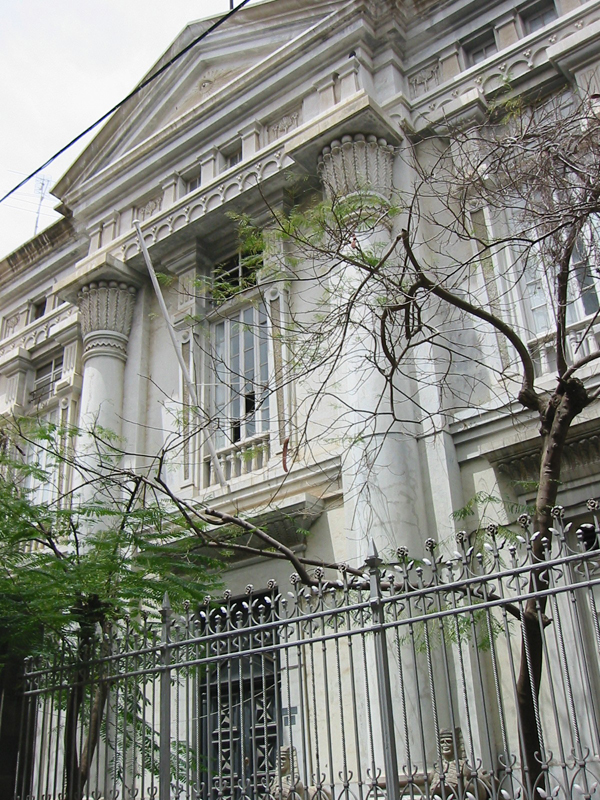
Masonic Temple of Santa Cruz de Tenerife.

The Canary Islands is the region with the largest community of Hindus in Spain, in fact, almost half of the country's Hindus live in the archipelago. Hinduism came to the Canary Islands from the Indian merchants who began settling there in 1870s of the 19th century. They initially concentrated around the free ports of Las Palmas de Gran Canaria and Santa Cruz de Tenerife, but have spread out. Tenerife is one of the few places in Europe where Ganesh Chaturthi is celebrated publicly.

Buddhist communities have emerged since the 1980s. At present, the Tibetan Buddhist denominations are more prominent within the Buddhist community. In 2005, two Canarian Buddhist converts were recognized as Dharma teachers by the orthodox Buddhist institutions, Francisco Mesa (Denkō Mesa) and Alejandro Torrealba (Acharya Dharmamitra Dhiraji), as lay spiritual leaders of Buddhist centers in Tenerife and Gran Canaria respectively.

There is also a presence of traditional Chinese religions among immigrants from this country, and also members of the Baháʼí Faith.

=== African American religions ===
Due to the strong link existing with Latin American countries such as Cuba and Venezuela, there is a presence in the islands of African-American practices such as Santería, Voodoo, Candomblé, Palo Mayombe and Venezuelan Spiritism.

=== Other ===
Freemasonry has had a great influence on the development of the history of the archipelago especially between the nineteenth and early twentieth centuries. The Masonic Temple of Santa Cruz de Tenerife was the largest Masonic center in Spain before it was occupied by the military of the Franco regime.

There are other small religious communities qualified as sects, such as the Church of Scientology (of which its founder L. Ron Hubbard visited the Canary Islands several times in the 1960s and 1970s) among others.

Especially singular is the Church of the Guanche People, a neo-pagan religion founded in 2001 that tries to implement the Canarian aboriginal religion as an ethnic religion in the current Canarian society.

== See also ==
- Religion in Spain
