= Domingo Vega de la Rosa =

Domingo Vega de la Rosa (born 1953, in Tenerife) is a painter from the Canary Islands, Spain. He lives and works in Los Realejos.

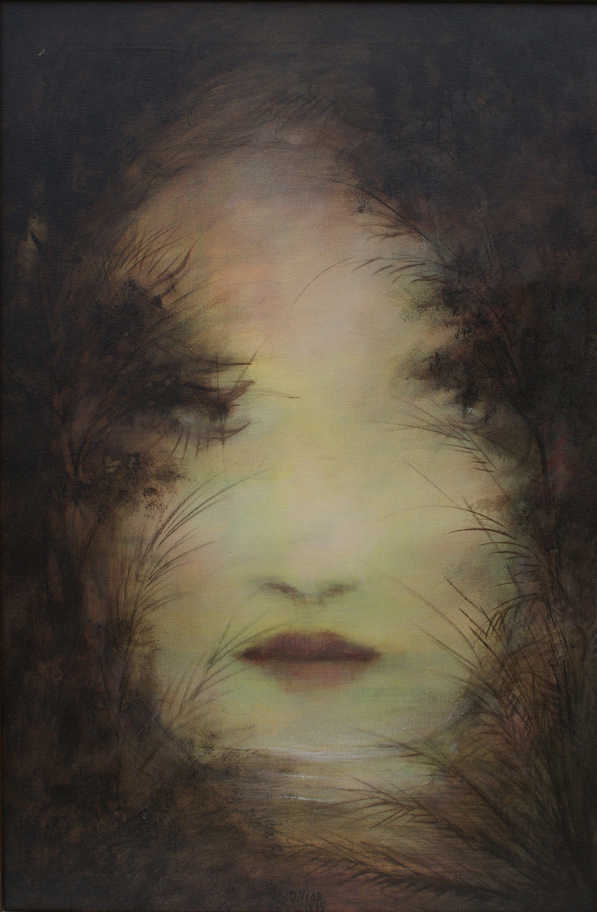
Rostro-Paisaje, 1985

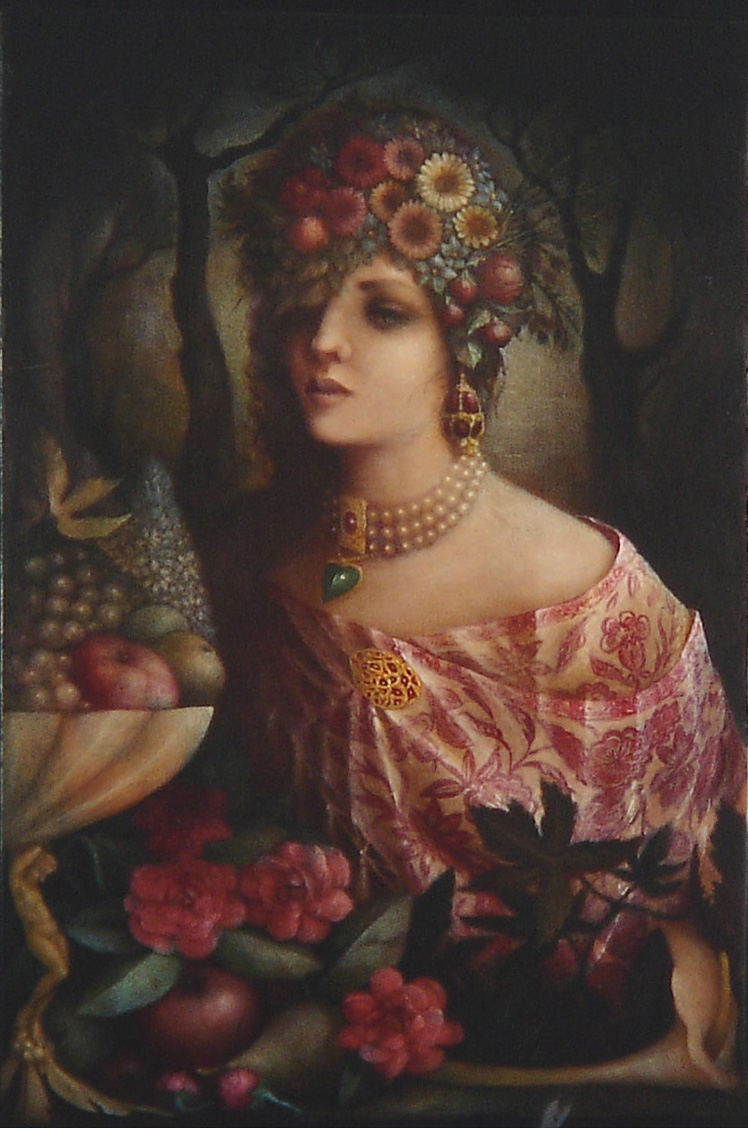
Odalisca con frutero y camelias, 1996

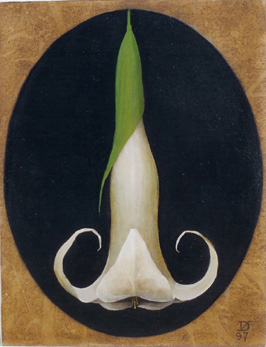
Datura, 1997

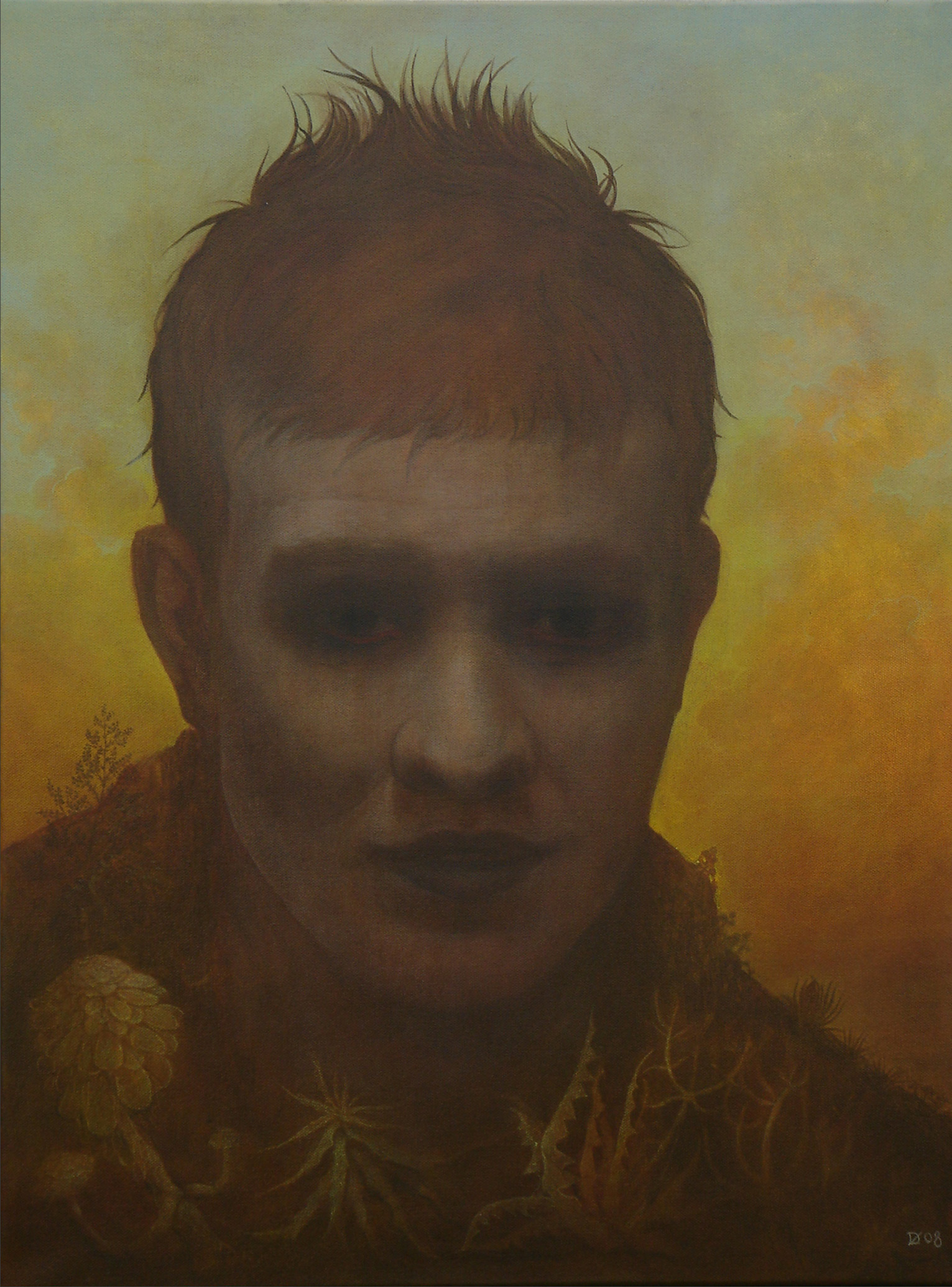
Paisaje imagen, 2008

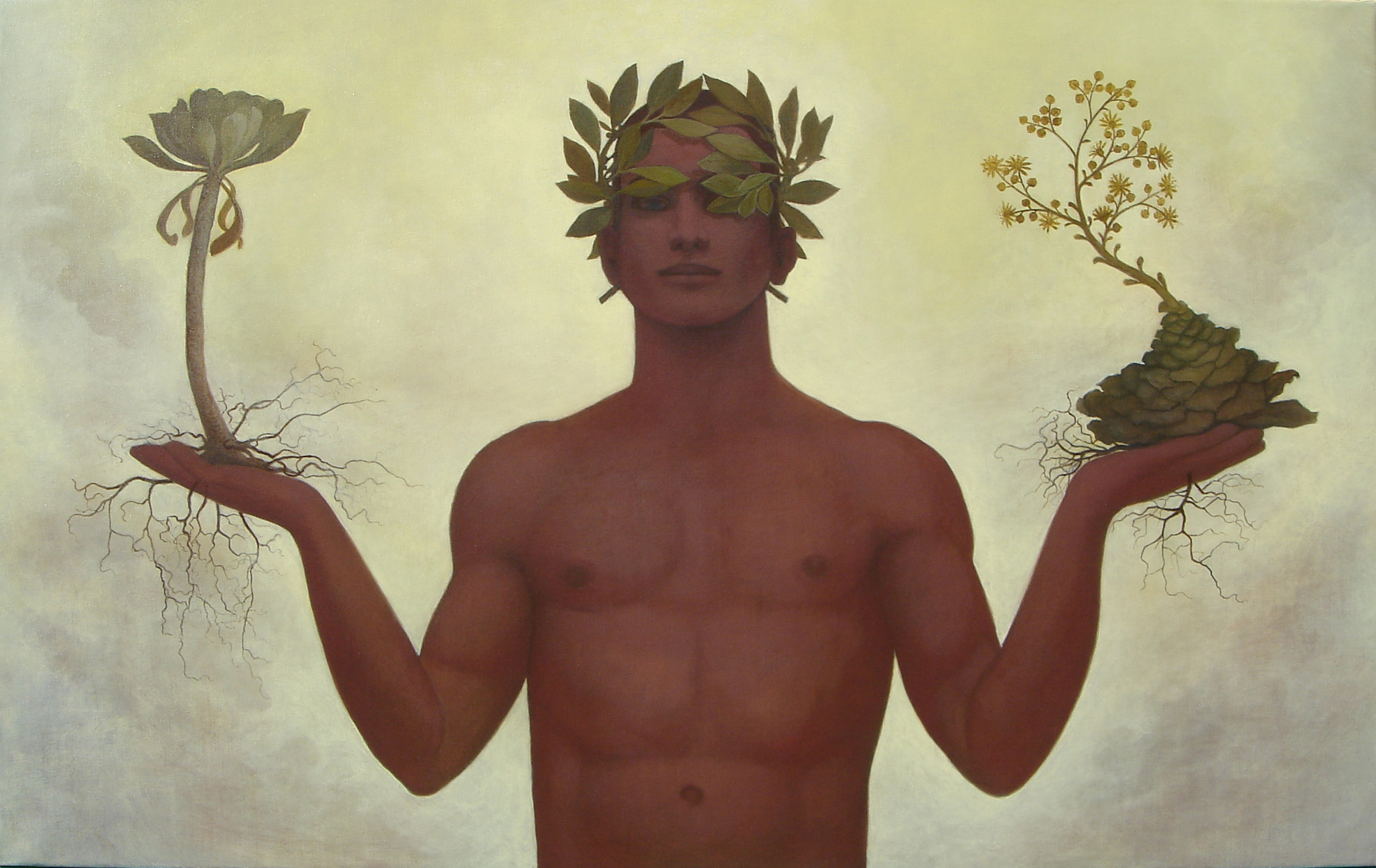
Atlante oferente, 2010

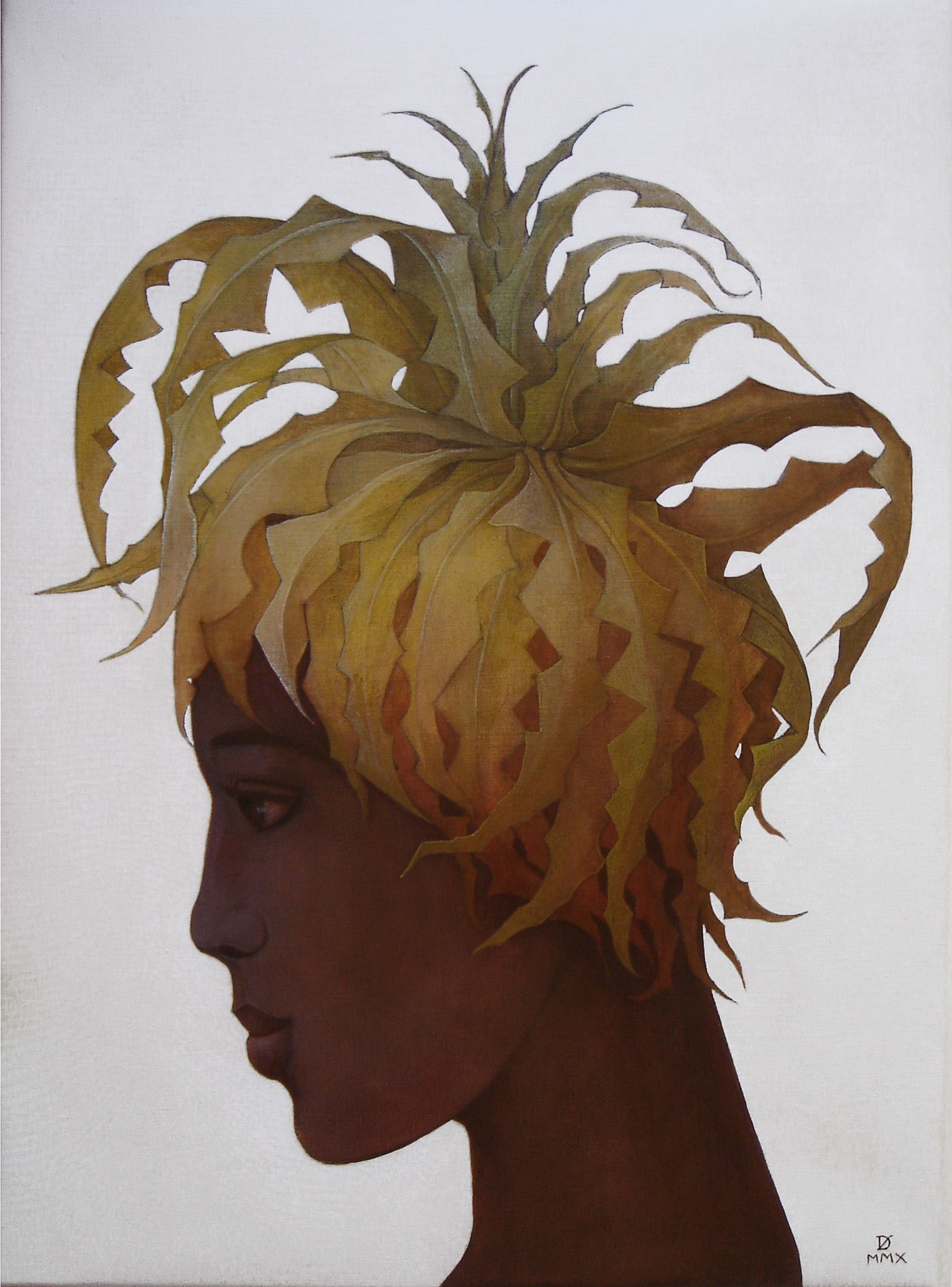
Negritud Sonchus, 2010

== Biography ==
=== Early life ===
Dominga Vega de la Rosa is born in Puerto de la Cruz, a town at the north coast of Tenerife. At the age of about thirteen, he got interested in painting because of an old encyclopaedia with black and white art reproductions. Later, he went to the library, to read books about modern art. His first exhibition was in 1977 in Palma de Mallorca.

He is an autodidact. After a study in tourism, he moved to Barcelona in 1974 and made a journey to the Netherlands where he visited the Frans Hals Museum in Haarlem. In musea he was trying to learn more about art. He felt a vocation as an artist.

=== The 70's ===
In 1975 he had to come back to Tenerife for military service. This was the year Francisco Franco died. This event was very important for his personal development and also for life in the Canarian Islands. In his spare time he followed a course about technical drawing and read a lot of books about different types of art. He felt a special attraction to surrealism. Salvador Dalí and the Canarian painter Óscar Domínguez were his examples. After his seniority, he decided to concentrate on painting seriously. He moved to Madrid, where he achieved to sell his first works. In 1977 he got an opportunity to exhibit some of his drawings in a bookshop in Palma de Mallorca, after having been painting all summer in Manacor. Afterwards he returned to Tenerife.

In the seventies, the only university of the Canary Islands was in La Laguna, Tenerife. This was also the period of the new democracy in Spain. A formative period, where culture and politics were very important and La Laguna was a meeting point which facilitated contacts. In 1978 Vega has his first solo exhibition of paintings in La Laguna. Through this exhibition he became known at the Canarian Islands and from this time on, he was able to make a living as a painter.

=== Later development ===
From 1984, he lived in Las Palmas de Gran Canaria and Madrid. He studied the original paintings of Néstor Martín-Fernández de la Torre and got lessons in actual art by Guillermo Pérez Vilalta. From 1993 he travelled several times to New York City to experience the artistic environment of this city and to participate in exhibitions.

Alongside his artistic activities, he went to study history in 1997, at the UNED (Universidad Nacional de Educaciόn a Distancia). He obtained his degree in January 2003 and in 2005 he graduated in his specialty of Art History with the research about Figurative art in the Latin-Mediterranean countries.

In 2007, he started to write articles about art in a few weeklies of Tenerifes newspapers. He also gave a series of lectures about Actual art (2008) and a series about Art and movies (2009) at the Instituto de Estudios Hispánicos de Canarias in Puerto de la Cruz, Tenerife. In 2011 the Council of Culture of the government of the Canary Islands organized an exhibition of the paintings of Domingo Vega de la Rosa in La Laguna, which he called Anthropoflora Vernacula. This exhibition meant an official recognition of his work.

=== Artistic Movement ===
In a wide way, his first work is influenced by Surrealism. This is very popular in Tenerife, since André Breton presented an international exhibition in 1935. Vega says, his work can be fitted in the actual figurative painting. His early works coincide with the beginning of neo-figurative movements and movements such as Anachronism, Pittura Colta or Iper Mannerism, arising in Italy in the late 70's and early 80's. He has also starred symbolism in his works. He was inspired by French symbolist painters and English Pre-Raphaelites. In his recent paintings, the Canarian flora is always present.

== Selection of exhibitions ==
- 1978 First individual exhibition of paintings, cultural center Ateneo, La Laguna, Tenerife
- 1985 Individual exhibition of touring artists in Caja Postal. Madrid, San Lorenzo del Escorial, Huelva and Jerez
- 1997 Participation in Five Artists, Maximillian Café, New York
- 2001 Individual exhibition "De la Apariencia al la Forma", Sala Barquillo, Caja Madrid, Madrid
- 2003 Individual exhibition "Transfiguraciones", Estudio Artizar, La Laguna, Tenerife
- 2011 Individual exhibition "Antropoflora Vernácula", Instituto de Canarias Cabrera Pinto in La Laguna, Tenerife
- Group exhibition "Grup Dimecres.1975-1980", Ses Voltes (Palma de Mallorca)
- 2012 Individual exhibition "Antropoflora Vernácula", Espacio Canarias, Creacion y Cultura, Madrid
