= Sagar Prakash Khatnani =

Spanish writer of Indian origin (born 1983)

- Born: Puerto de la Cruz, Tenerife; June 6, 1983 (age 43)
- Occupation: Novelist
- Notable work: Amagi (2013)

Sagar Prakash Khatnani (born June 6, 1983) is a Spanish writer of Indian descent.

== Biography ==
Sagar Prakash was born in Sindhi family in the city of Puerto de la Cruz on the island of Tenerife (Canary Islands). He studied for a Higher Level Training Course in Audiovisual Production, Radio Shows, and several courses in filmmaking and photography. He later studied International Technician Protocol in Madrid. After winning several competitions of literature, he decided to embark on writing of Amagi for more than six years, writing in the evenings and between the hours free from work.

His first book, Amagi, was published in Spain by Suma de Letras publishing house in 2013 and became a bestseller, both to be published later in Latin America. Sagar Prakash is also collaborator of the blog Migrated of newspaper El País.

In 2014, the City of Puerto de la Cruz proposed Sagar Prakash Khatnani for Premios "Joven Canarias" that year, prize that was finally granted. In June 2016 Amagi was also published in Italian by the publisher Tre60.

== Works ==
- Amagi (2013)
- Sawai (2018)
