= Puerto de la Cruz =

City in Tenerife, Spain

- Municipality and city
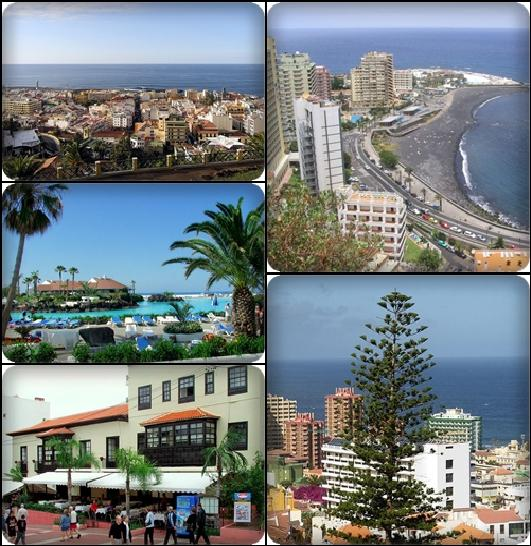
- Top left: panorama view of Puerto de la Cruz; top right: Martianez Beach; middle left: Laguna Martianez; bottom left: Armas Square shopping area; bottom right: view of Araucaria heterophylla tree in Loro Park

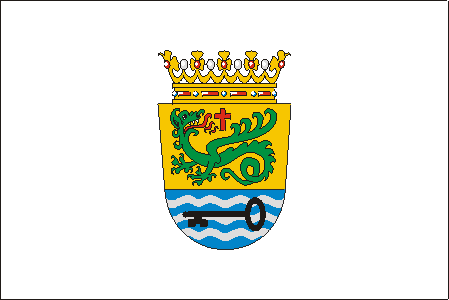
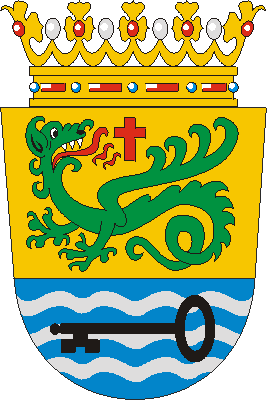
- Flag Coat of arms
- Location of Puerto de la Cruz
- Location within Tenerife
- Coordinates: 28°25′N 16°32′W
- Country: Spain
- Autonomous community: Canary Islands
- Province: Santa Cruz de Tenerife

Government
  - Alcalde (Mayor): Leopoldo José Afonso Hernández (PP)

Area
  - Total: 8.73 km^{2} (3.37 sq mi)
- Elevation: 4 m (13 ft)

Population (2025-01-01)
  - Total: 31,137
  - Density: 3,570/km^{2} (9,240/sq mi)
- Time zone: UTC±0 (WET)
  - Summer (DST): UTC+1 (WEST)
- Postal code: 38400
- Official language(s): Spanish
- Website: Official website

Puerto de la Cruz is a city and municipality in the northern part of the island of Tenerife, Canary Islands, Spain. It was formerly known by its English translation, "Port of the Cross", although now it is known by its Spanish name in all languages. Puerto de la Cruz is located on the northern coast, 4 km (2 mi) northwest of La Orotava and 30 km (19 mi) west of Santa Cruz de Tenerife. The TF-5 motorway passes through the municipality. The population is 30,483 (2018). In Spanish, the local inhabitants are known as Portuenses. With an area of 8.73 km^{2} (3 sq mi), the municipality is the smallest in Tenerife. The elevation of the town's centre is 9 m (30 ft) above sea level and the highest point being Las Arenas, a volcanic cone with an elevation of 249 m (817 ft).

== Historical population ==
Year	Population
1991	25,447
1996	24,542
2001	26,441
2002	30,466
2003	31,830
2004	30,088
2013	28,929
2018	30,483
2021	30,179

== Economy ==
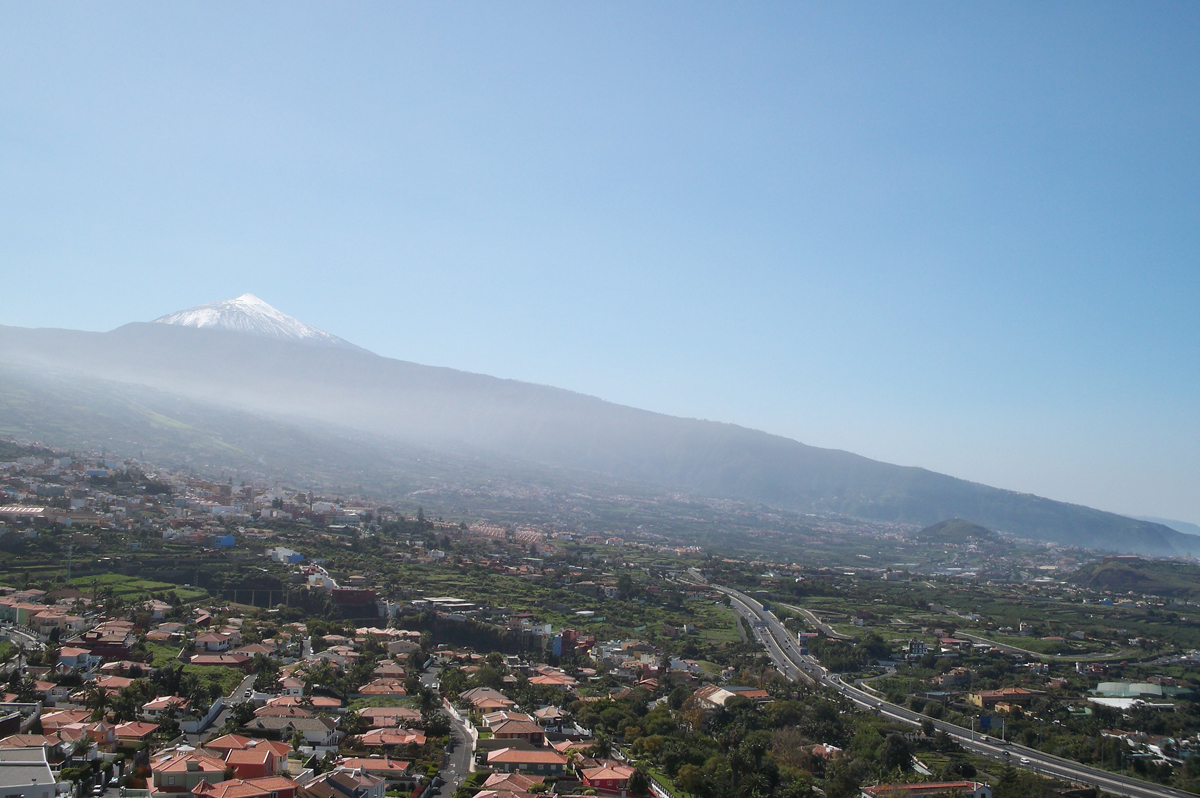
Valle de La Orotava and Puerto de la Cruz were the first holiday resorts on the Canary Islands.

Puerto de la Cruz occupies a prominent place in the history of tourism of the islands. The export economy established by the European colonizers after the conquest in the 15th century generated large commercial and passenger movements for decades. The first foreign visitors quickly felt drawn to the beneficial qualities of the weather in the Taoro Valley.

Before mass tourism existed in Puerto de la Cruz, minority tourism catered for privileged elites who were interested in climatology, botany and the tranquillity of the location. The proximity of the Canary Islands to Europe meant that travel for health reasons was a primary driver for launching modern tourism here.

At the beginning of the 19th century, the environment of Puerto de la Cruz attracted researchers and travellers from Europe. At this stage Puerto de la Cruz was a leading cultural center accommodating many travellers and writers, including William Wilde, Alexander von Humboldt, or Sabin Berthelot.

Puerto de la Cruz therefore gained an illustrious reputation in Europe, and when it came to the subsequent advent of modern tourism, the city was at an advantage compared with other tourist sites.

== Climate ==
Puerto de la Cruz enjoys a hot semi-arid climate (Köppen climate classification: BSh) bordering a tropical wet and dry climate, with warm winters and hot, dry summers.

== History ==
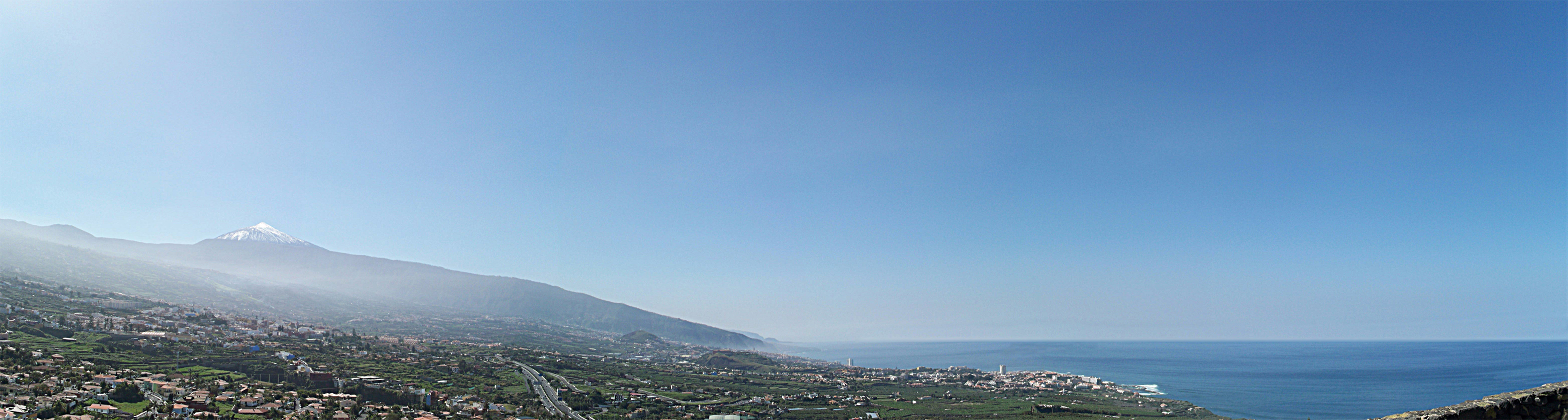
Panorama of Valle de La Orotava

The city's origins date back to the early 16th century. It existed in 1502 as a coastal port, and as the dependent population center of La Orotava. In 1603 a church and its corresponding square were built.

It was originally a fishing village that grew as local trade was increasing. The port became the most important in the island when a volcano eruption destroyed Garachico in 1706. The sugar trade gave way to wine, resulting in large scale social and economic development.

In the mid-17th century the inhabitants began to express their desire to form their own community, receiving the Royal Provision of Felipe IV on 3 May 1651, which empowered them to appoint a village head.

It belonged to the municipality of La Orotava, and in 1772, a municipal corporation was elected by the residents. It was known as Puerto de La Orotava, and it was not until 1808 that it obtained full municipal autonomy, changing its name to the current Puerto de la Cruz.

Tourism began to have an important role in the local economy in the late 19th century. It was in those years that the Grand Hotel Taoro was built and that old family houses began to be remodelled, for example as Marquesa or Monopol, transforming them into the first hotels in the city center. Finally, the real tourism boom came in the 1950s, when the city began its transformation into the tourist reference point of the island and of the archipelago.

During the second edition of the Ecological Film Festival of Nature in Puerto de la Cruz, at which guests were invited to give lectures and provide round tables, the Tenerife Manifesto was announced (29 May 1983). This text was a precursor of political ecology in Spain, and would initiate a process leading to the founding of the political party of the Greens.

== Sites of interest ==
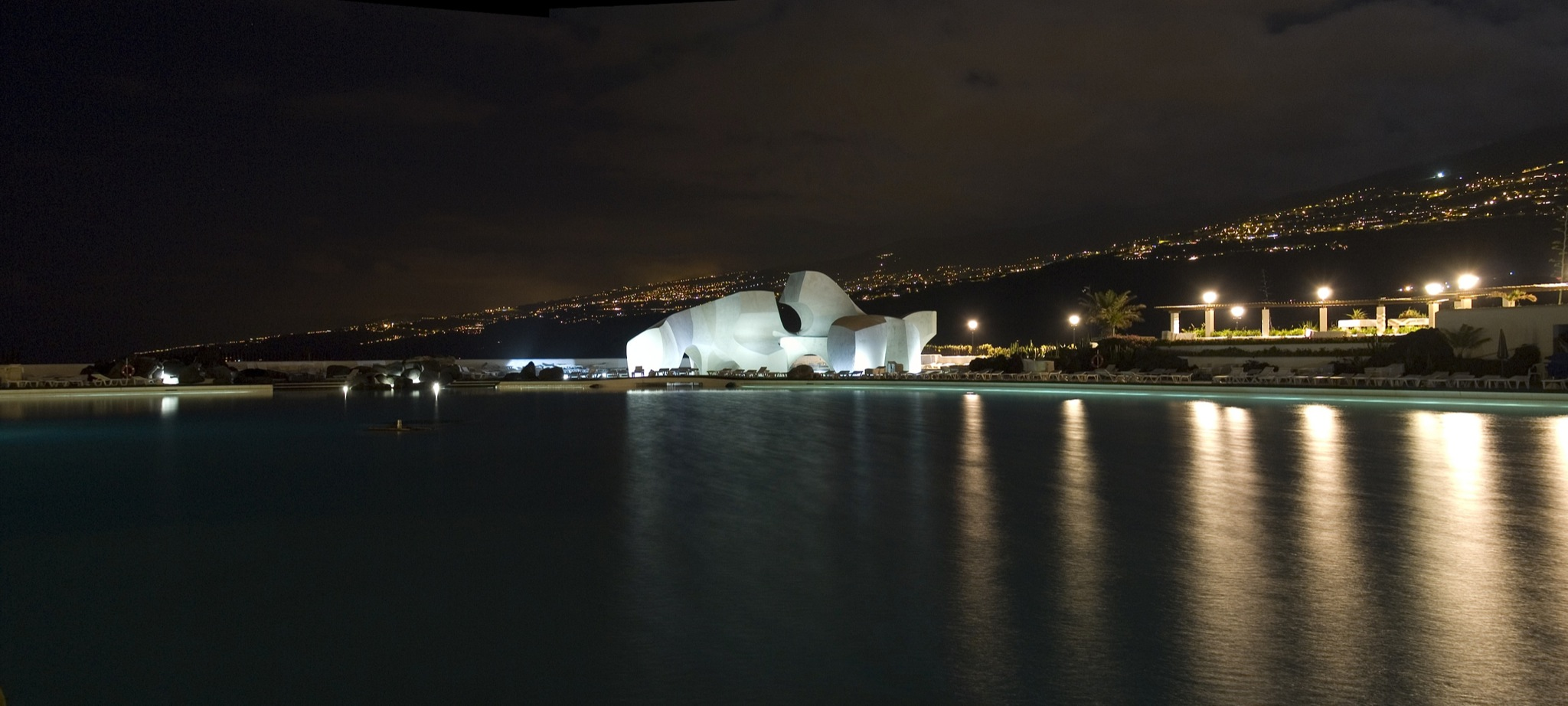
Monument to the waves, Lago Martianez (night view). Puerto de la Cruz, Tenerife.

- Martiánez Pools (Lago Martiánez) completed and designed by the famous Canary architect César Manrique.
- Jardín Beach in Puerto de la Cruz, a famous beach filled with palm trees and hotels.
- Plaza del Charco, in the town centre.
- Loro Parque, a famous park and zoo located on the outskirts of the city.
- Ermita de San Amaro, dedicated to the semi-legendary Saint Amaro.
- Archaeological Museum of Puerto de la Cruz, with important pieces of prehistory of the island, which also houses the idol Guanche, called Guatimac.
- Anglican Church of Puerto de la Cruz The Church of All Saints, located within the Taoro Park, was built by British residents in the city. Puerto de la Cruz has the oldest Anglican cemetery in the Canary Islands.
- Church of Nuestra Señora de la Peña de Francia, located in the town centre, the largest Catholic church in Puerto.
- Botanical Garden in the El Botánico district, opened in 1788, it is the second-oldest Botanical garden in Spain.
- Castillo San Felipe, a small stone castle next to Playa Jardín.
- La Ranilla, a fisherman's neighborhood (recently renovated).

== Tourism ==
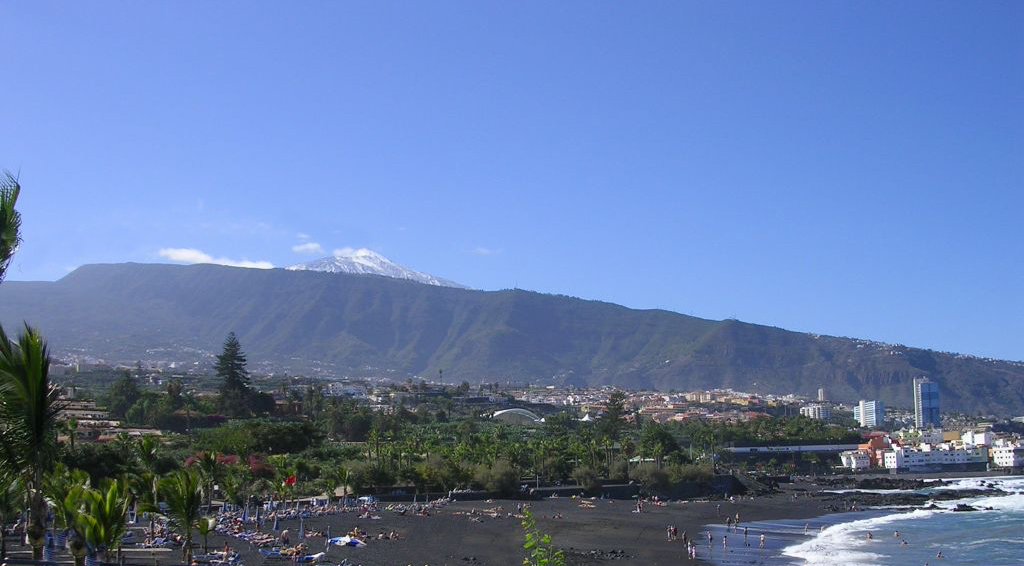
Jardín Beach. Puerto de la Cruz

Tourism is an important industry in Puerto de la Cruz, as evidenced by the number of large hotels visible on the skyline.

Puerto de la Cruz is frequented by Northern Europeans during the winter months, due to its mild climate, and is particularly popular over the Christmas and the New Year periods. The Western European contingent tends to consist of more mature couples vis-à-vis resorts such as Playa de las Americas. The summer months see more Spanish tourists, particularly during August when conditions on the Spanish mainland can be excessively hot.

== Education ==
The British School of Tenerife has its Yeoward Campus in Puerto de la Cruz.

== Events ==
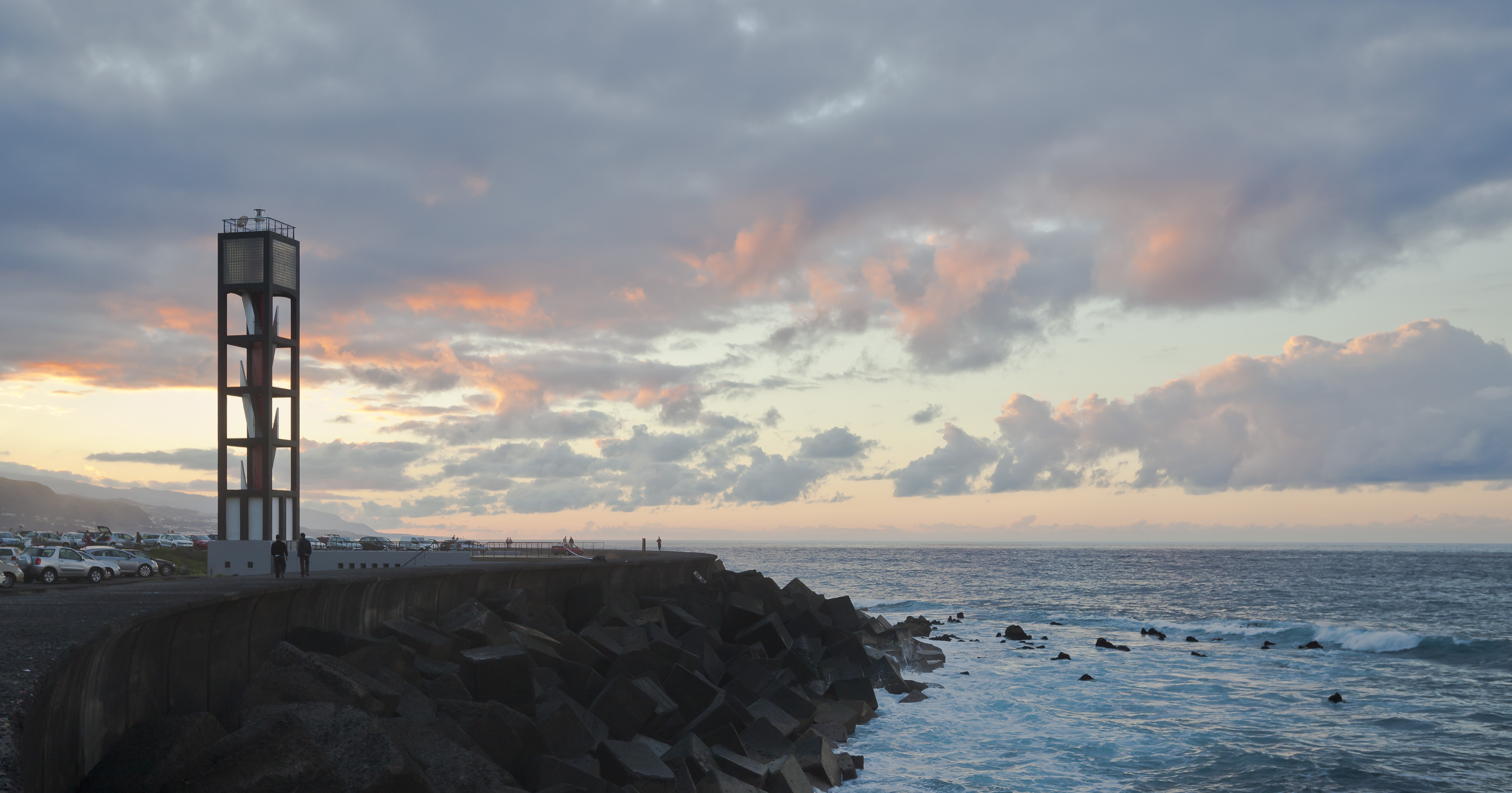
Faro, Puerto de la Cruz, Tenerife, España.

The Tenerife Airshow (Festival de Aeromodelismo) (Spanish for 'Aeromodelling festival') is held every year near the harbour, usually in Europa Square. The airshow celebrated its 25th anniversary in 2006.

El Carnaval, held every year. Ash Wednesday is in the middle of Carnival.

"La Embarcacion de la Virgen del Carmen" (The Sea-setting of the Virgin Carmen), is held on 16 July. In latter years it has become "la Fiesta del Agua" (The Water Party), where copious amounts of water are thrown during the festivities.

It is preceded by "La Sardinada" (The Sardine Festival), where sardines are fried and sold the night before at San Telmo. Hundreds of people congregate in Charco Square and its fishing port, where festival goers participate in games, like the popular 'run-along-the grease-pole', which involves participants having to run along a greased pole and catch a flag to win the game. Because of the normally mild July weather, people go in T-shirt and shorts, or just bathing suits, and enjoy a quick dip in the waters of the port to help cool themselves down. The event starts around 12-1 o'clock in the afternoon and lasts until around 10–12 o'clock at night.

A few days before the main carnival procession a large papier mache sardine is wheeled through the streets, brought to the waterfront and "blessed" with "holy water" (normally petrol or lighter fluid) by a man dressed as a bishop. The sardine is then set alight, to huge applause. After this, a huge firework display ensues. The event is known as the "Burial of the Sardine".

Amongst the crowd at this event, "professional mourners" can be seen; these are invariably men in drag, who wail for comic effect.

Although the Burial of the Sardine rarely starts on time, the event always attracts crowds, and it is advised to arrive early at the harbour.

== Photos ==
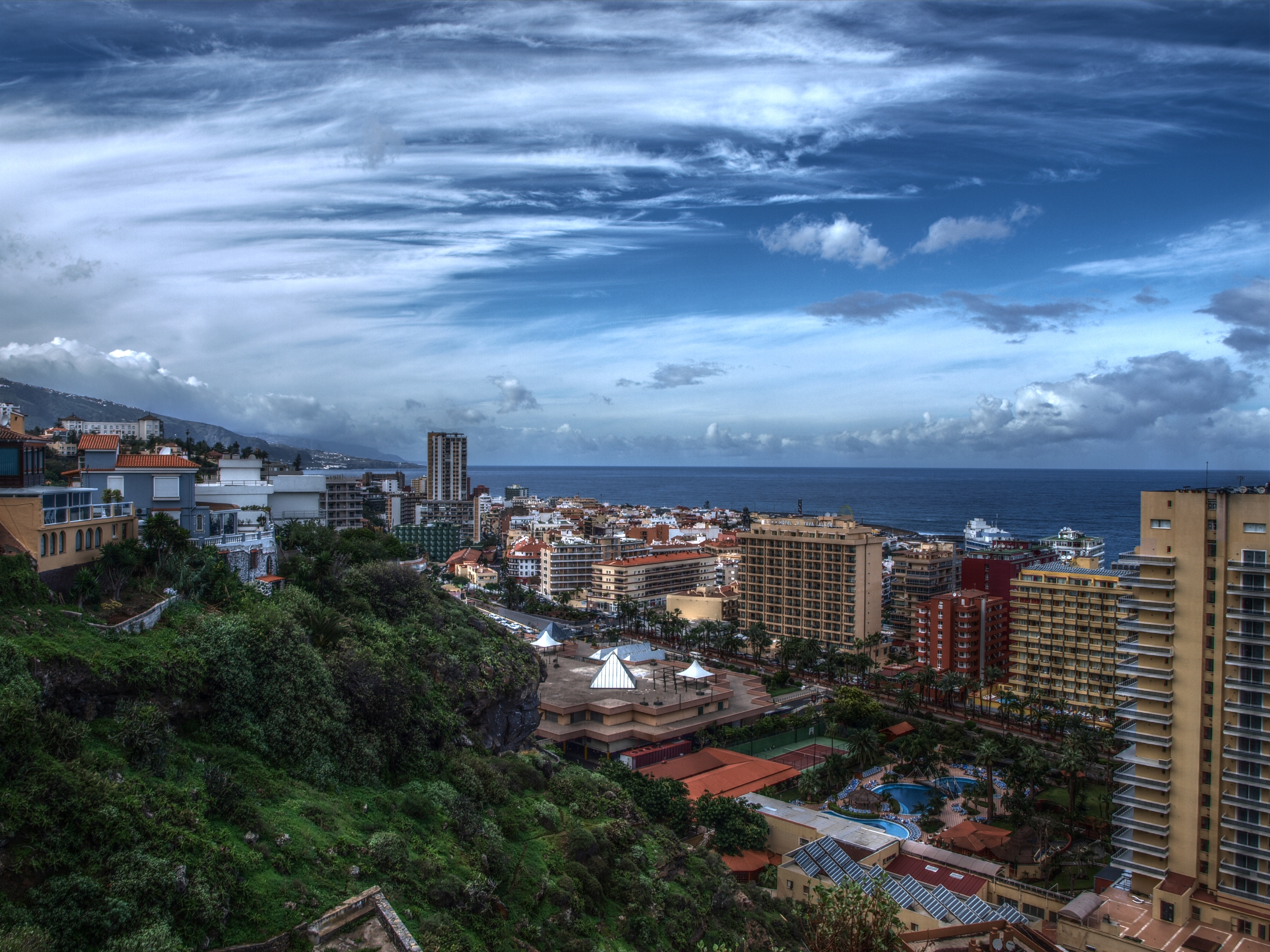
Puerto de la Cruz

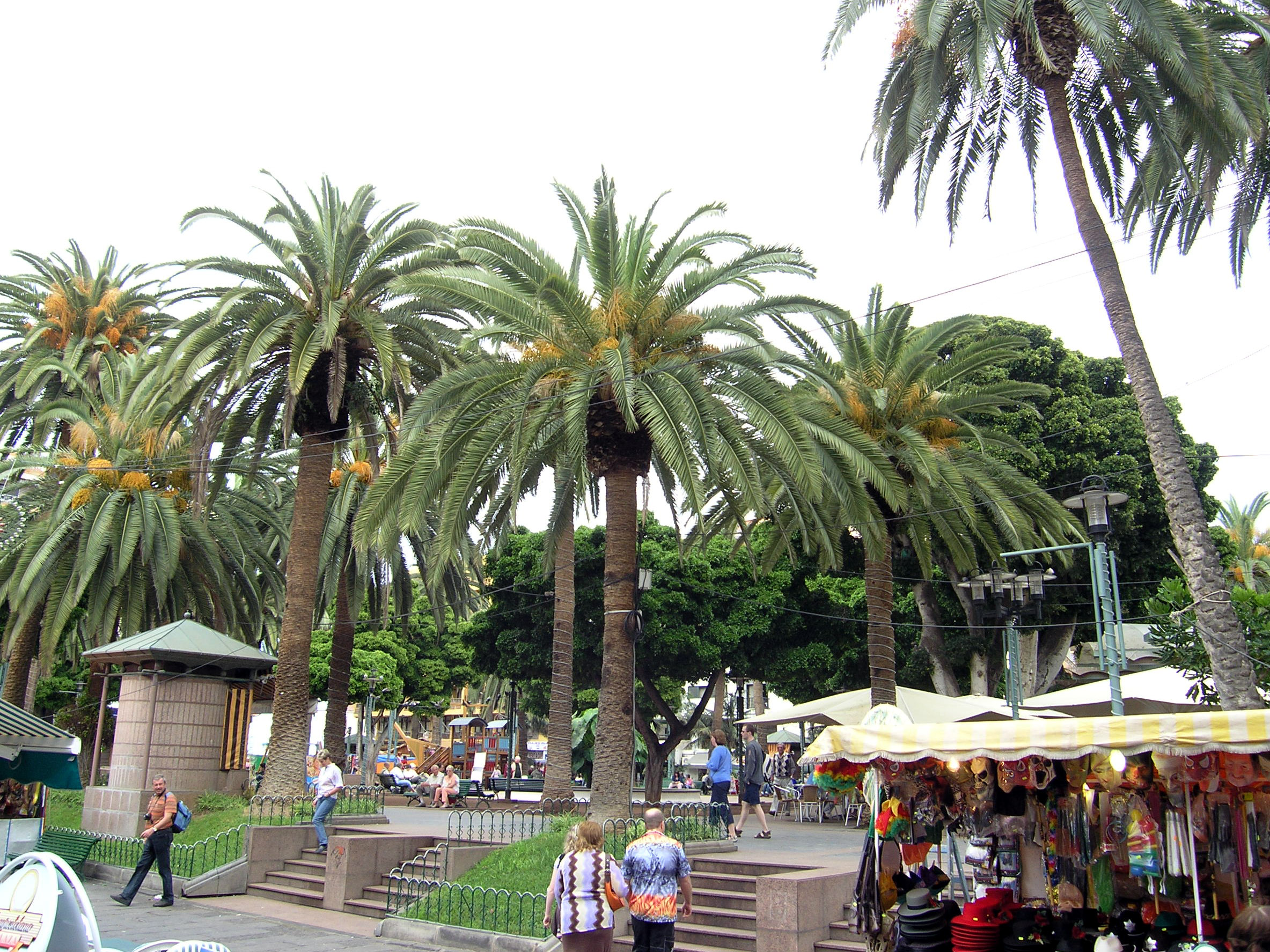
Charco Square

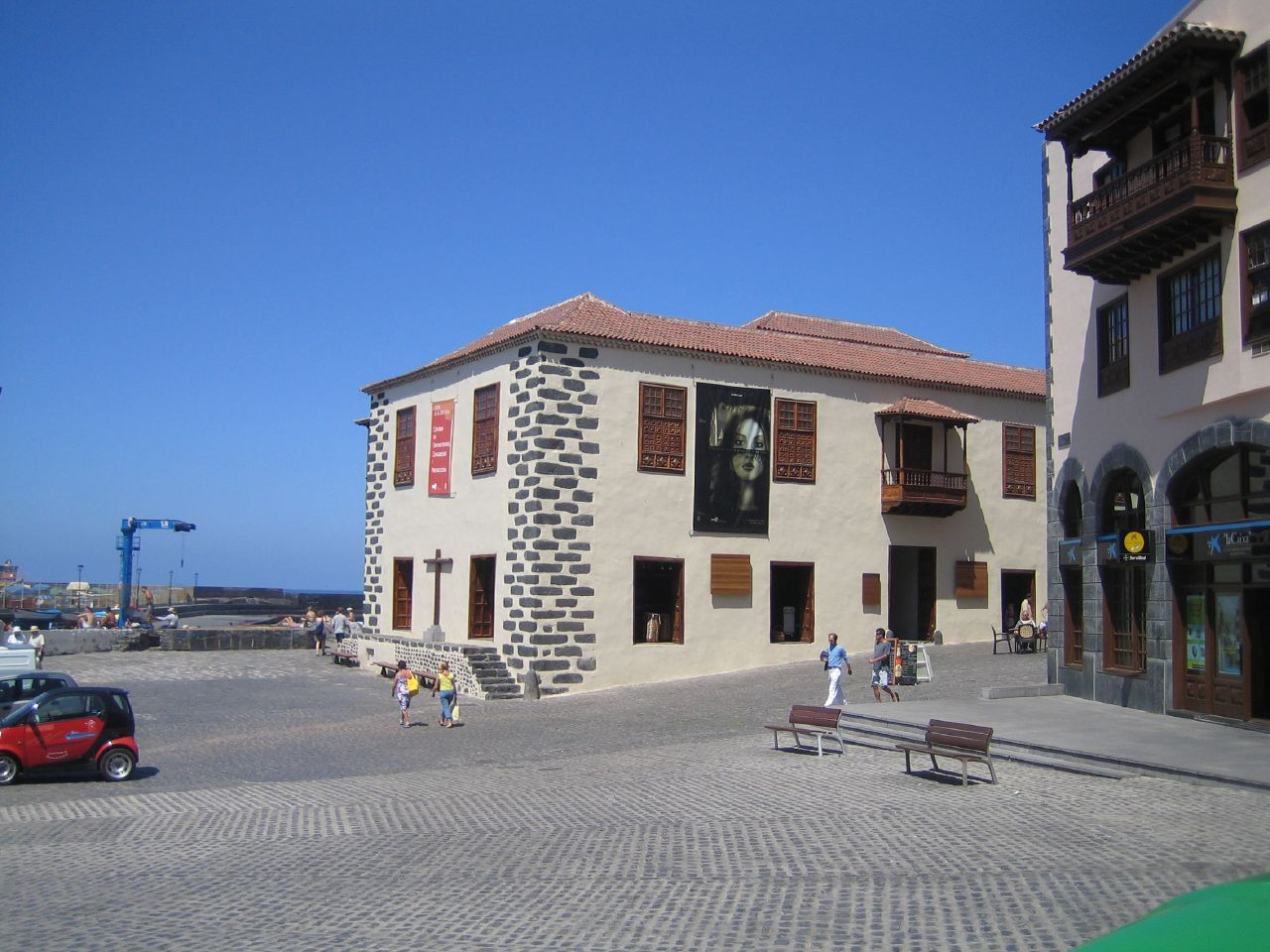
Casa de la Aduana

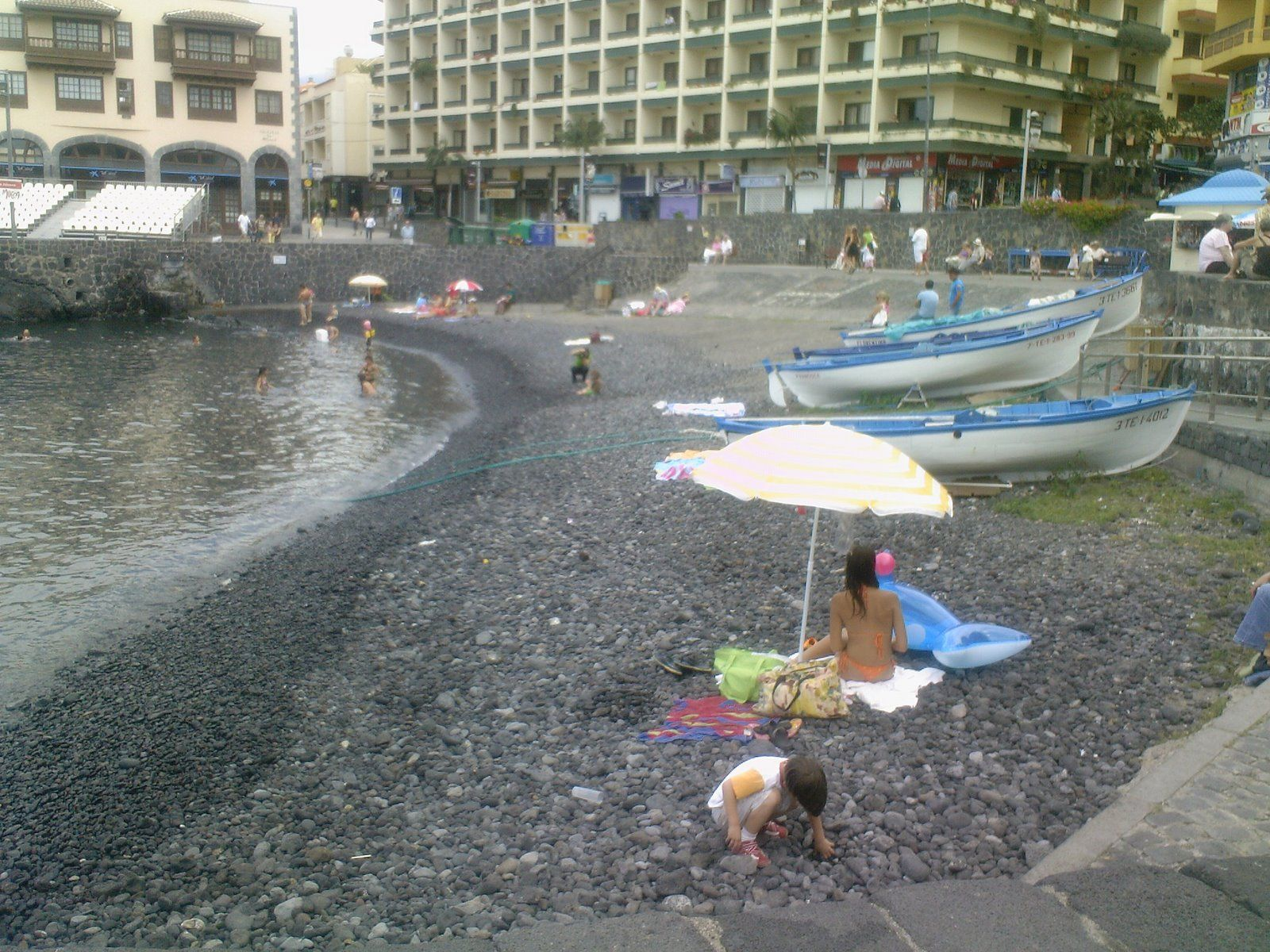
Old harbour

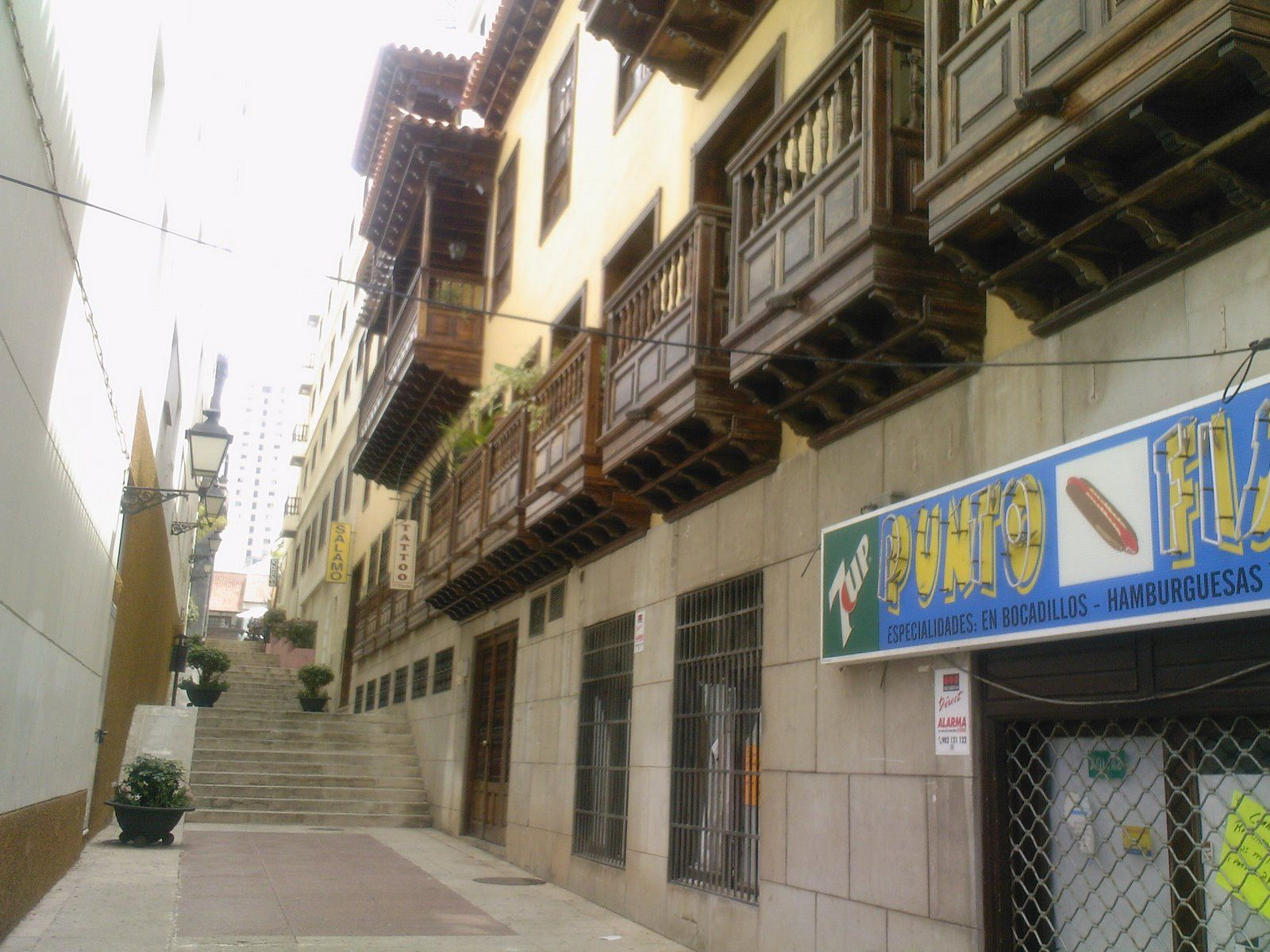
Typical houses

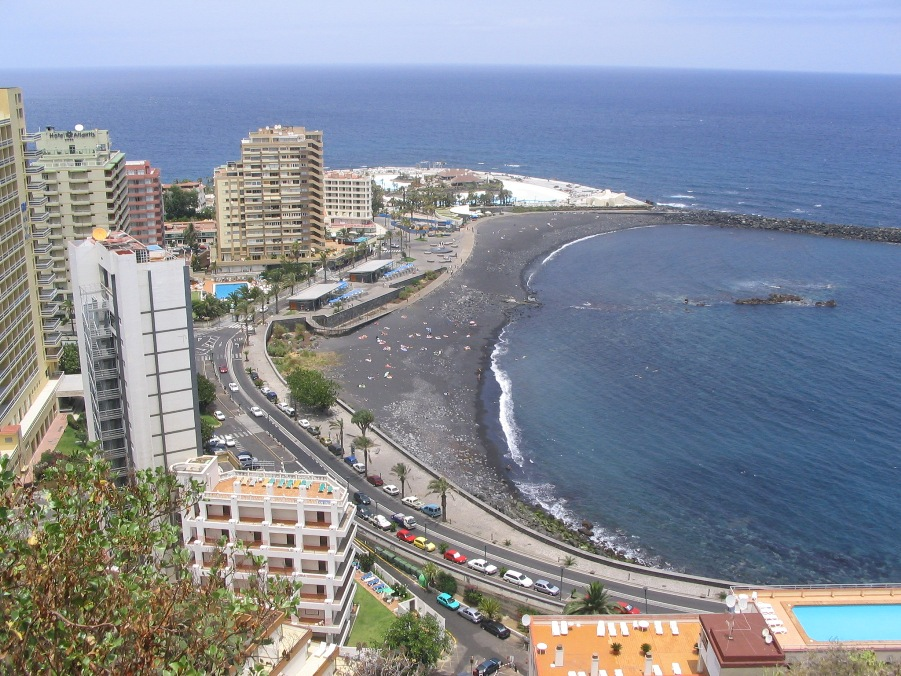
Playa de Martianez

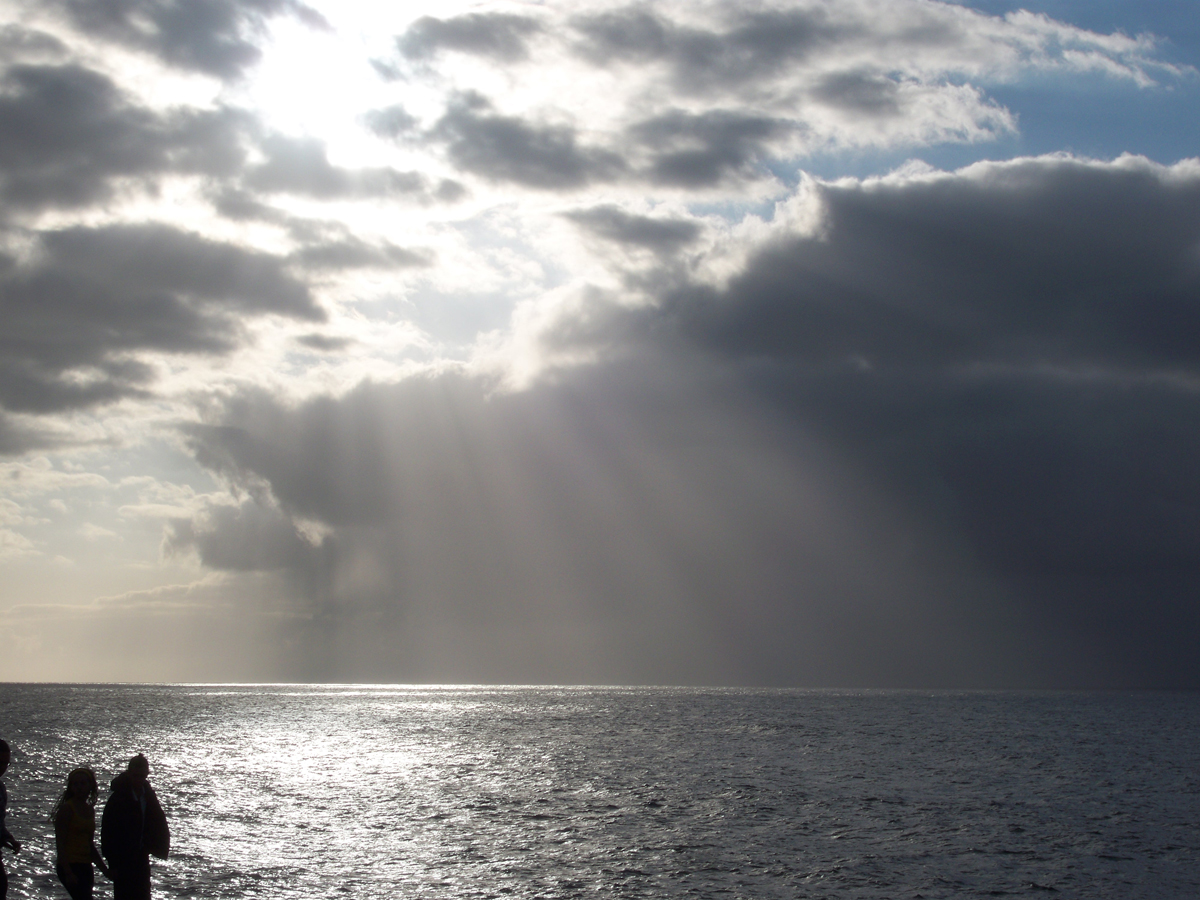
Views of Atlantic Ocean from Puerto de la Cruz

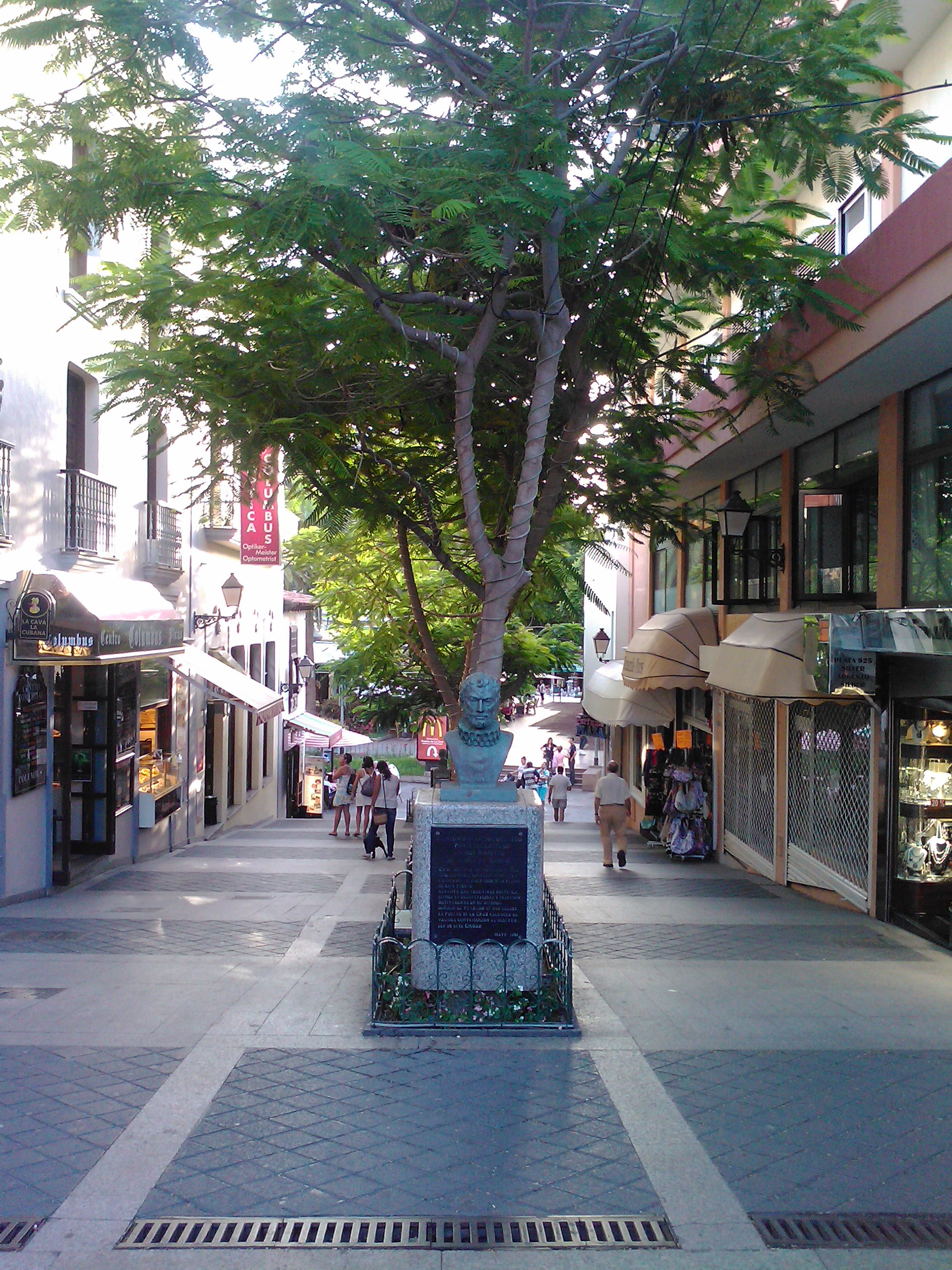
Quintana Street

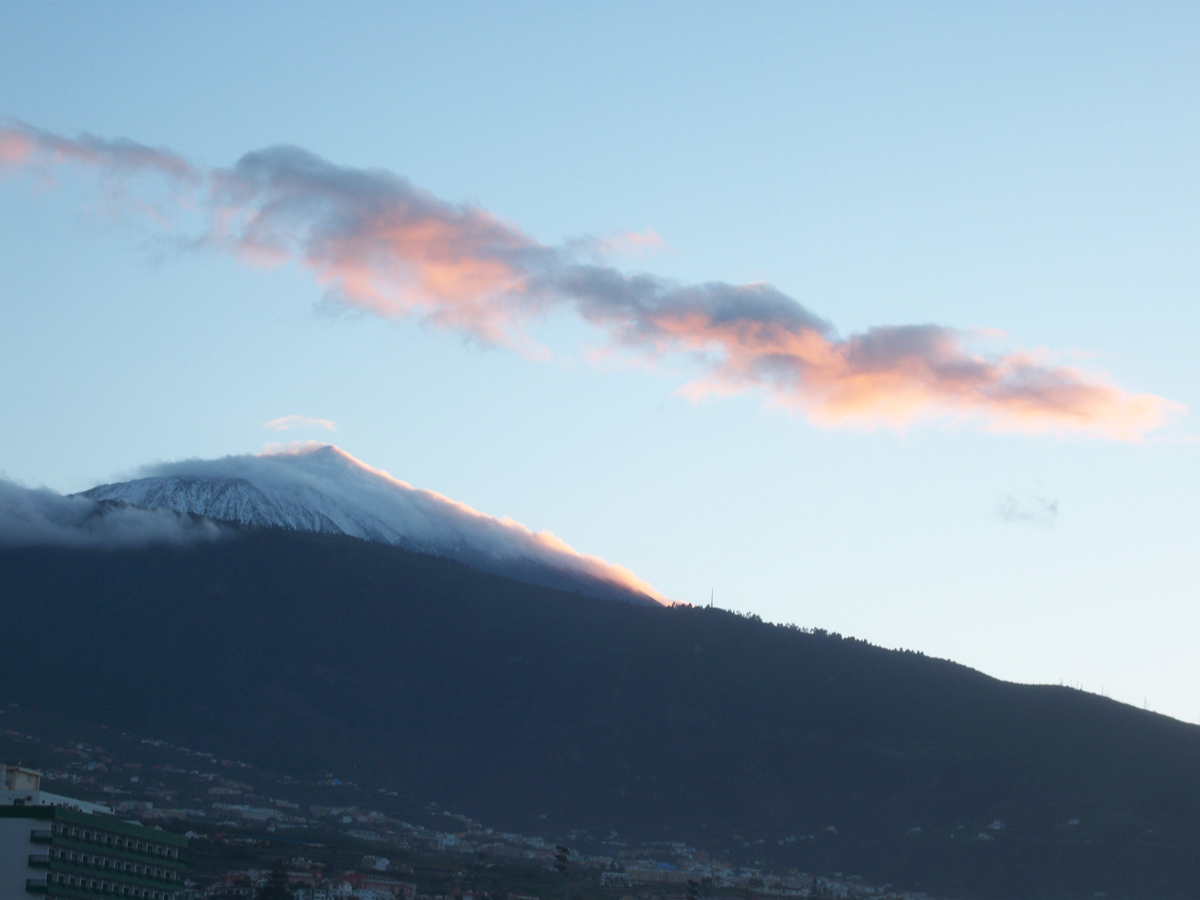
Teide seen from Puerto de la Cruz

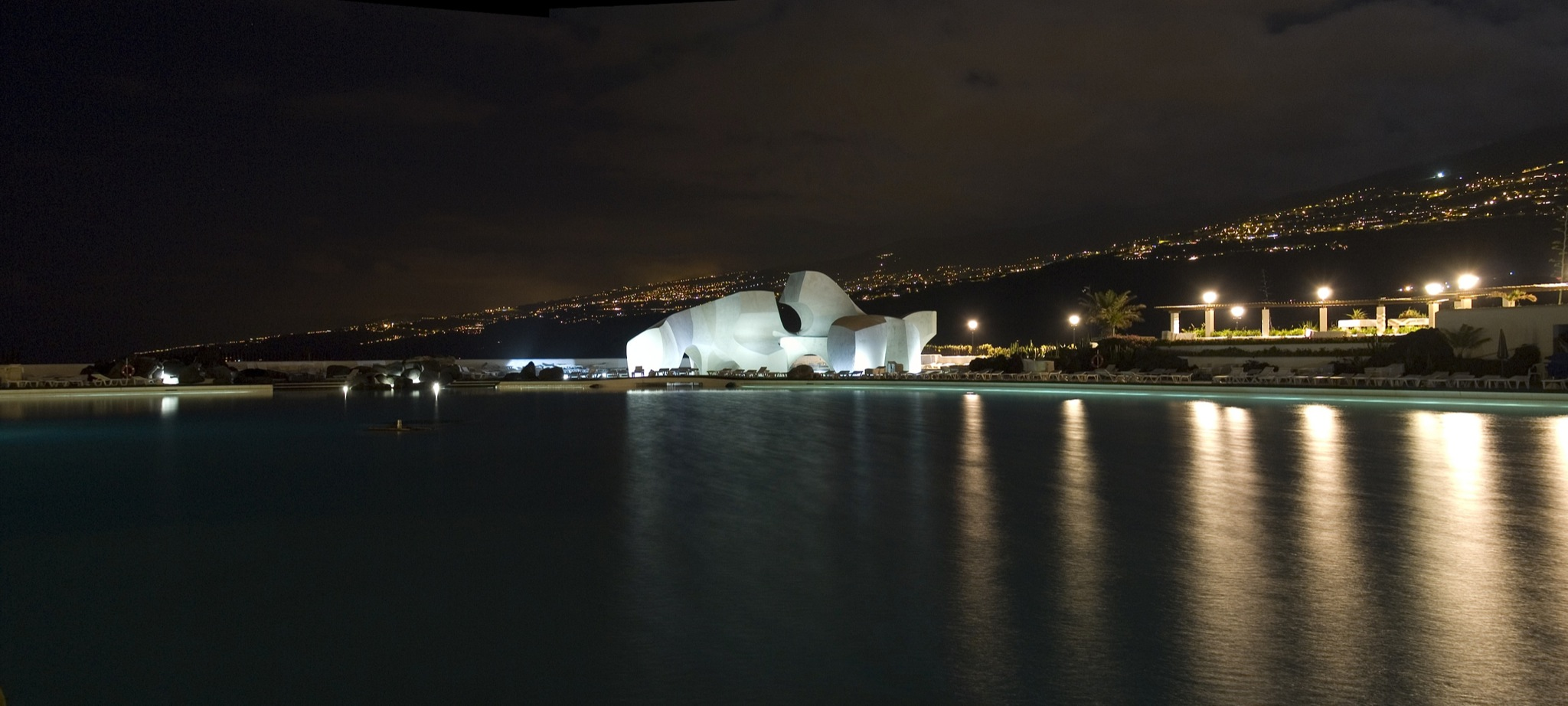
Complejo Lago Martiánez

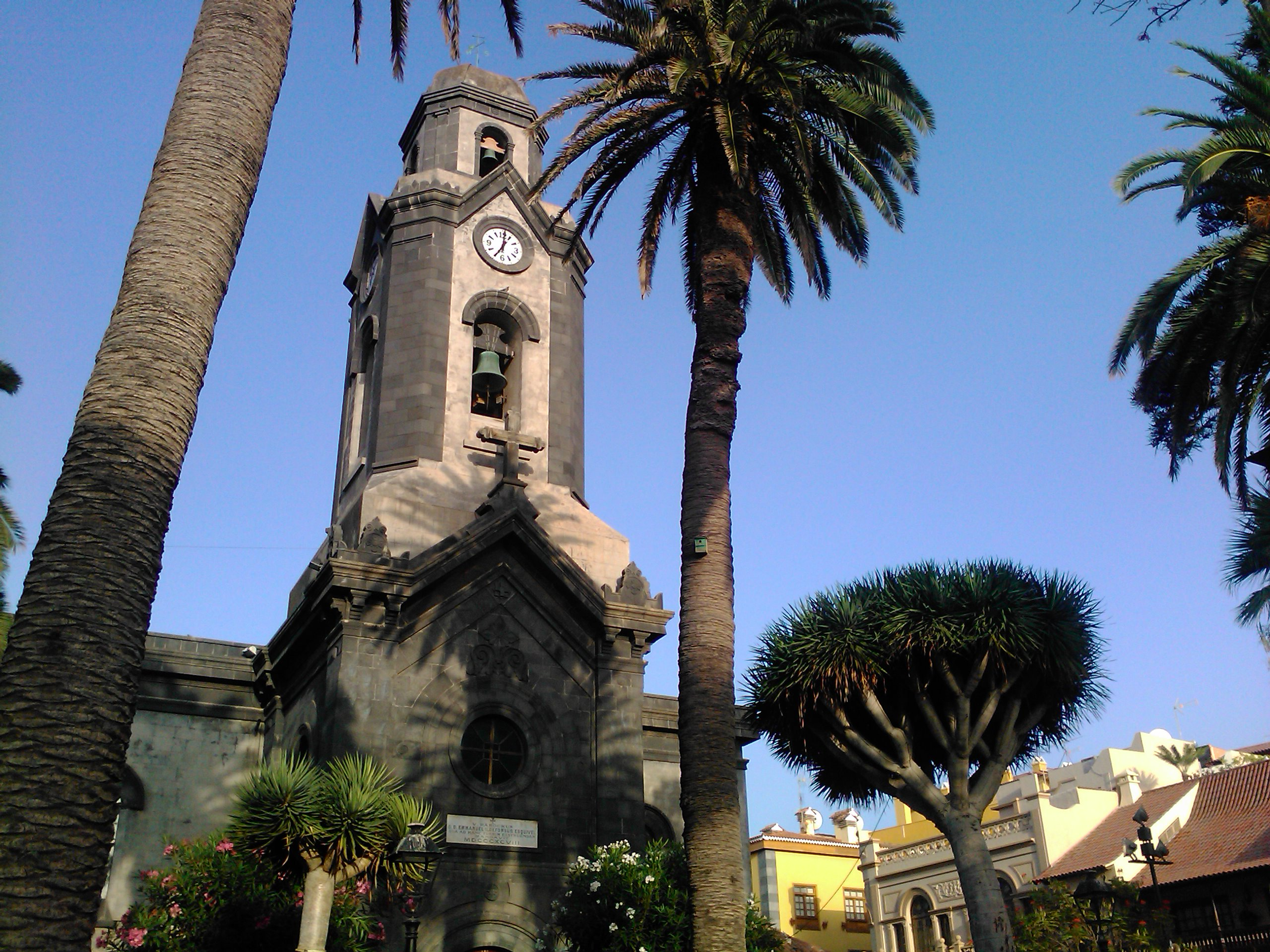
Nuestra Señora de la Peña de Francia Church

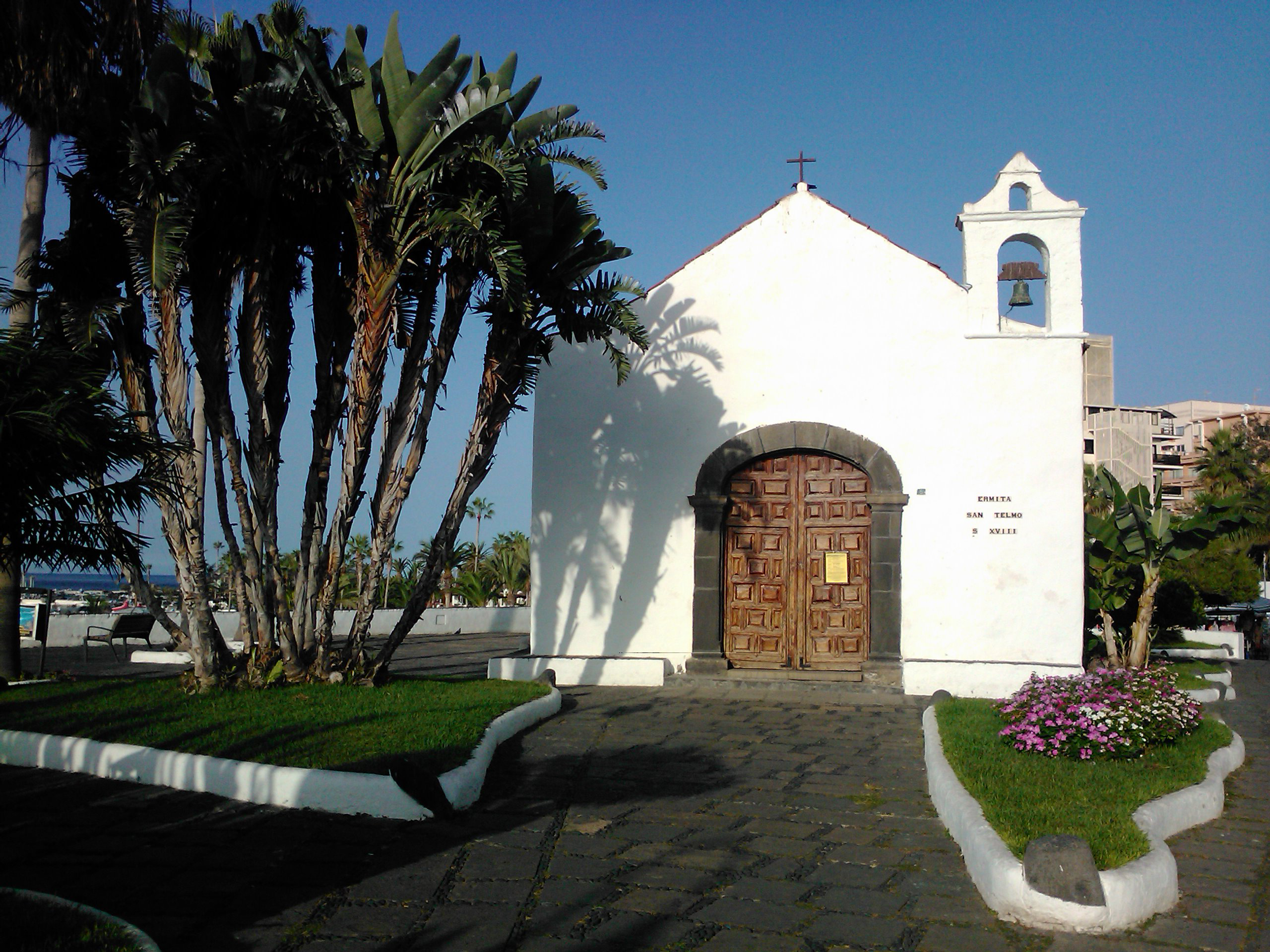
San Telmo Hermitage

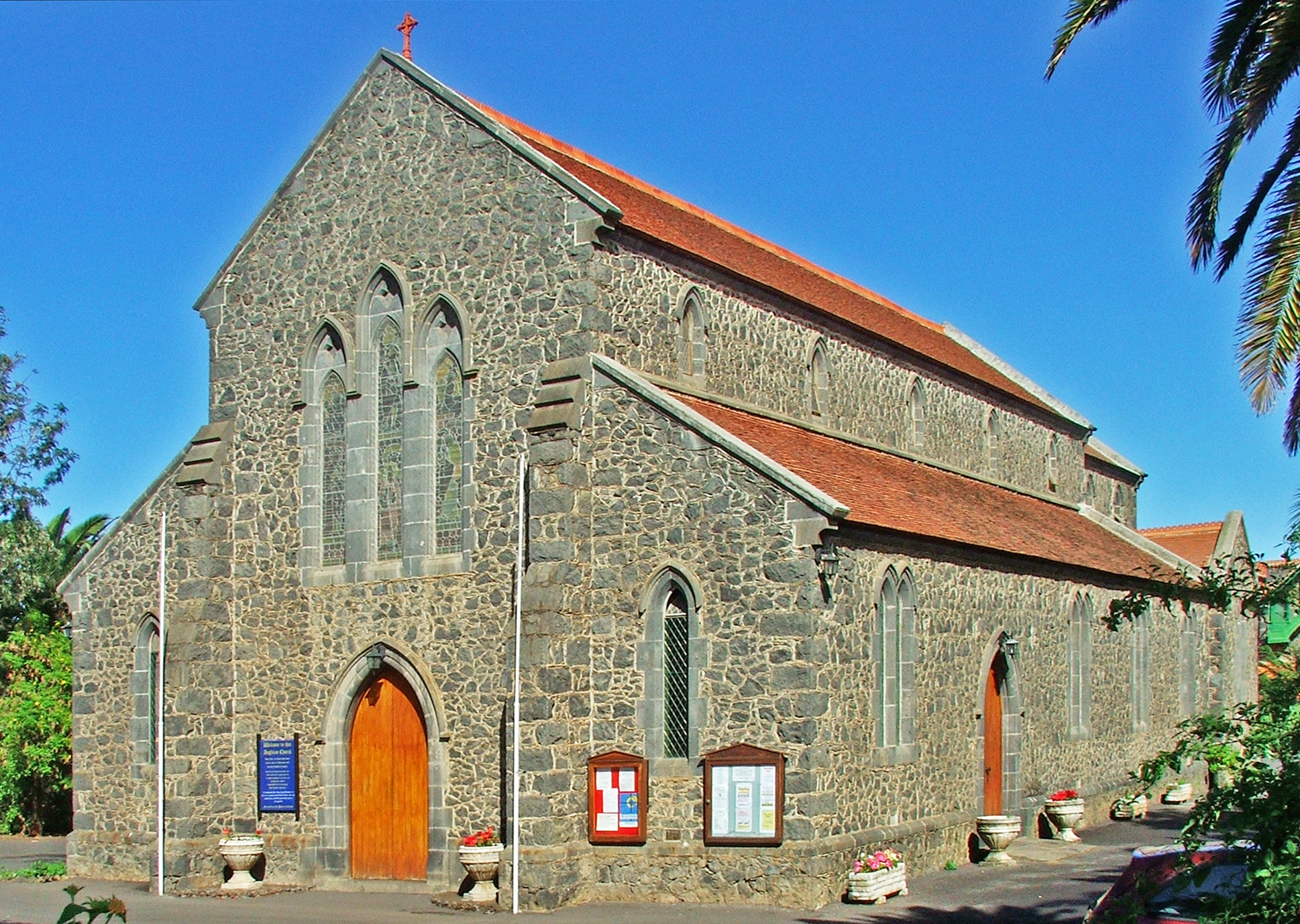
All Saints Church (anglican worship)

== People ==
- Tomás de Iriarte (1750–1791), poet
- Agustín de Betancourt (1758–1824), engineer
- Agustín Espinosa (1897–1939), poet
- Tom Hernández (1915–1984), actor
- Domingo Vega de la Rosa (born 1953), a painter of the movement: surrealism
- Andi Deris (born 1964), a German singer
- Michael Weikath (born 1962), a German musician
- Michael Hennet Sotomayor (born 1983), known as Mikel, singer, member of the Spanish band D'NASH
- Sagar Prakash Khatnani (born 1983), is a Spanish writer of Indian origin.

== Sister cities ==
- Almuñécar, Spain
- Düsseldorf (2003), Germany
- Martinsicuro, Italia (2000), Italy
- Puerto la Cruz, Venezuela

== See also ==
- List of municipalities in Santa Cruz de Tenerife
