= All Saints' Church, Puerto de la Cruz =

- Iglesia de Todos los Santos
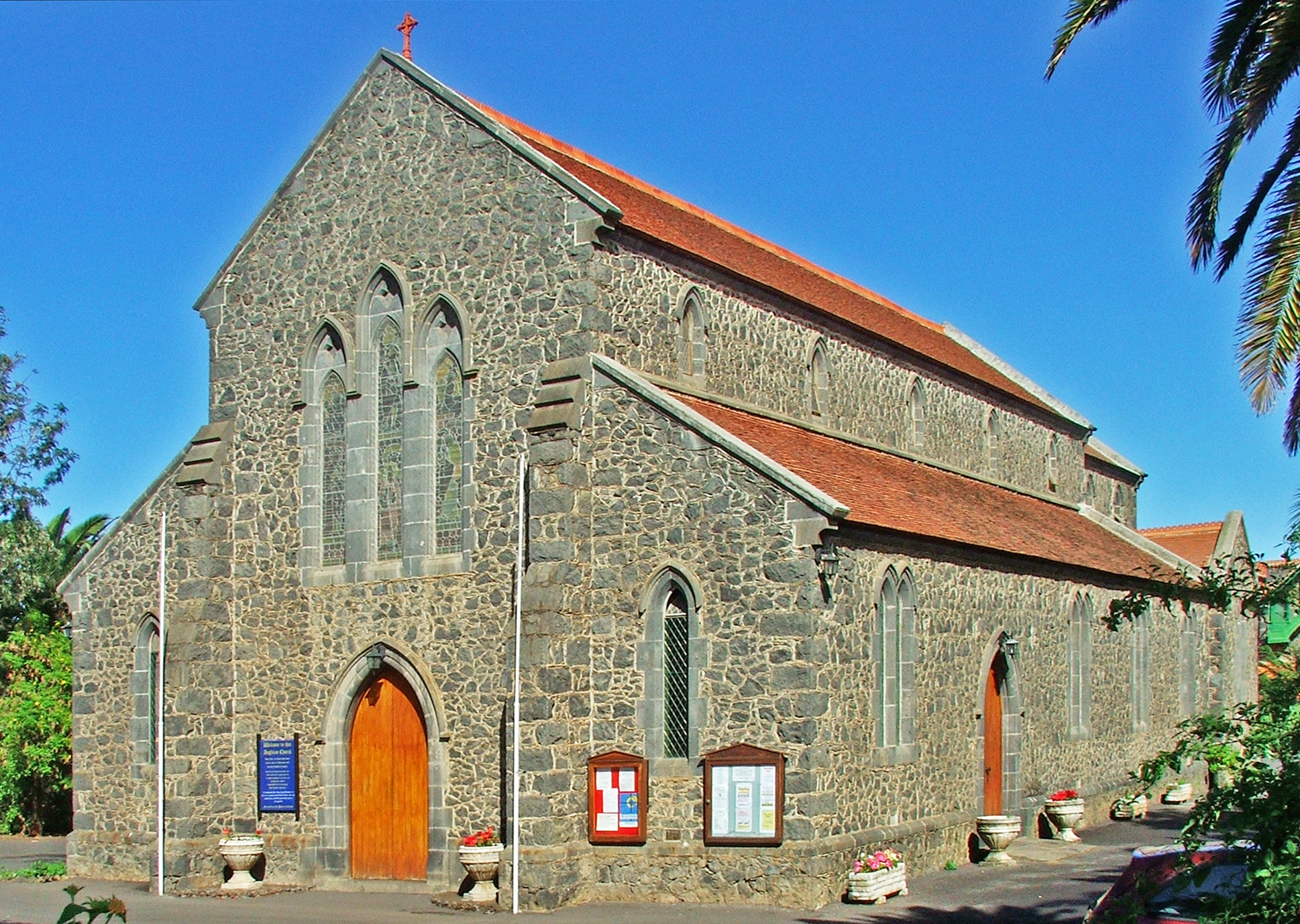
- All Saints' Church, Puerto de la Cruz

- Location within Canary Islands
- 28°24′34″N 16°32′54″W
- Location: Puerto de la Cruz, Tenerife
- Country: Spain
- Denomination: Church of England
- Website: allsaintstenerife.org

History
- Status: Parish church
- Consecrated: 1893

Architecture
- Functional status: Active
- Architect: Frederick Franey
- Architectural type: Church
- Style: Gothic Revival
- Groundbreaking: 7 May 1890
- Completed: 14 June 1891

Administration
- Province: Canterbury
- Diocese: Europe
- Archdeaconry: Gibraltar

All Saints' Church (Spanish: Iglesia de Todos los Santos, opened 1890), also known as Anglican Church of All Saints, is a Church of England parish church located in the city of Puerto de la Cruz on the island of Tenerife (Canary Islands, Spain).

== History ==
The first Anglican communities to arrive in the Canary Islands settled mainly in the cities of Puerto de la Cruz, Las Palmas, Santa Cruz de Tenerife, and to a lesser extent in Santa Cruz de La Palma.

In Puerto de la Cruz, Anglican worship was originally held every Sunday at the home of the British Vice-Consul Peter Spence Reid, although he was a Presbyterian and a member of the Church of Scotland.

In 1887 he founded the Taoro Company, which, in the same year, designated free land for the construction of an Anglican church. In November of that year the Bishop of the Anglican Diocese of Sierra Leone the Rt Revd Ernest Graham Ingham visited Puerto de la Cruz and formed a committee to implement the church building project.

The church was built with money donated by foreign visitors and British residents in the city. The organ, the pulpit, stained glass windows, baptismal font and other items were private donations. The clergy house and the stained glass windows were gifts from Mary Boreham and other family members. She was the widow of Walter Long Boreham who had died in 1890. The church is built in Gothic Revival style.

All Saints' of Puerto de la Cruz was the first Anglican church built in the Canary Islands. Puerto de la Cruz also has the archipelago's oldest Anglican cemetery. In 1964 the church fell under the administration of the Anglican Diocese of Gibraltar.

== Parish ==
The parish of All Saints covers all of northern Tenerife, the metropolitan area of the island and the island of La Palma. To the south of Tenerife is the Anglican Church of St. Francis, South Tenerife in the municipality of Adeje.

== See also ==
- Anglicanism in Spain
