= Timeline of the COVID-19 pandemic in Spain =

Sequence of major events in ongoing COVID-19 viral pandemic in Spain

The COVID-19 pandemic in Spain has resulted in 13,980,340 confirmed cases of COVID-19 and 121,886 deaths.

The virus was first confirmed to have spread to Spain on 31 January 2020, when a German tourist tested positive for SARS-CoV-2 in La Gomera, Canary Islands. Post-hoc genetic analysis has shown that at least 15 strains of the virus had been imported, and community transmission began by mid-February. By 13 March, cases had been confirmed in all 50 provinces of the country.

A lockdown was imposed on 14 March 2020. On 29 March, it was announced that, beginning the following day, all non-essential workers were ordered to remain at home for the next 14 days. By late March, the Community of Madrid has recorded the most cases and deaths in the country. Medical professionals and those who live in retirement homes have experienced especially high infection rates. On 25 March, the official death toll in Spain surpassed that of mainland China. On 2 April, 950 people died of the virus in a 24-hour period—at the time, the most by any country in a single day. On 17 May, the daily death toll announced by the Spanish government fell below 100 for the first time, and 1 June was the first day without deaths by COVID-19. The state of alarm ended on 21 June. However, the number of cases increased again in July in a number of cities including Barcelona, Zaragoza and Madrid, which led to reimposition of some restrictions but no national lockdown.

Studies have suggested that the number of infections and deaths may have been underestimated due to lack of testing and reporting, and many people with only mild or no symptoms were not tested. Reports in May suggested that, based on a sample of more than 63,000 people, the number of infections may be ten times higher than the number of confirmed cases by that date, and Madrid and several provinces of Castilla–La Mancha and Castile and León were the most affected areas with a percentage of infection greater than 10%. There may also be as many as 15,815 more deaths according to the Spanish Ministry of Health monitoring system on daily excess mortality (Sistema de Monitorización de la Mortalidad Diaria – MoMo). On 6 July 2020, the results of a Government of Spain nationwide seroprevalence study showed that about two million people, or 5.2% of the population, could have been infected during the pandemic. Spain was the second country in Europe (behind Russia) to record half a million cases. On 21 October, Spain passed 1 million COVID-19 cases, with 1,005,295 infections and 34,366 deaths reported, a third of which occurred in Madrid.

As of September 2021, Spain is one of the countries with the highest percentage of its population vaccinated (76% fully vaccinated and 79% with the first dose), while also being one of the countries more in favor of vaccines against COVID-19 (nearly 94% of its population is already vaccinated or wants to be).

As of 4 February 2023, a total of 112,304,453 vaccine doses have been administered.

== January ==
On 31 January 2020, Spain confirmed its first COVID-19 case in La Gomera, Canary Islands. A tourist from Germany tested positive and was admitted to University Hospital of the Nuestra Señora de Candelaria.

== February ==
On 9 February, the second case involved a British male tourist in Palma de Mallorca, Balearic Islands, who contracted the disease after coming into contact with someone in France who subsequently tested positive.

On 12 February, Barcelona's Mobile World Congress was cancelled.

On 13 February, the first death in Spain was recorded involving a 69-year-old man who had been in Nepal. He died in Valencia and was diagnosed post-mortem.

On 24 February, following a COVID-19 outbreak in Italy, a medical doctor from Lombardy, Italy, who was on holiday in Tenerife, tested positive at the University Hospital of the Nuestra Señora de Candelaria in Spain. The H10 Costa Adeje Palace in Tenerife was put on lockdown.

On 25 February, four new cases related to the Italian cluster were confirmed in Spain:

- In Canary Islands, the wife of the medical doctor from Lombardy, who was on holiday in Tenerife, tested positive.
- In Catalonia, a 36-year-old Italian woman living in Spain, who visited Bergamo and Milan from 12 to 22 February, also tested positive in Barcelona.
- A 24-year-old man from Madrid, who recently returned from Northern Italy, tested positive and was admitted to Hospital Carlos III.
- In the Valencian Community, a man from Villarreal, who recently travelled to Milan, tested positive and was admitted to Hospital Universitario De La Plana, Castellón.

On 26 February:

- The first reported case in Andalusia was confirmed in Seville.
- On the Canary Islands, two Italian tourists, who were on holiday with the Italian doctor and his wife, also tested positive. The group were transferred to University Hospital of the Nuestra Señora de Candelaria and underwent quarantine. In Barcelona, a 22-year-old man who visited Italy a few days ago was tested positive. Another positive was detected in Hospital Nuestra Señora de Guadalupe, San Sebastián de La Gomera.
- A second case in Madrid was also reported.

On 27 February:

- In Barcelona, a 22-year-old woman from Tenerife, who travelled to Italy from 19 to 25 February, was admitted to Hospital Clínic.
- In Castile and León, an 18-year-old Italian Erasmus student studying in IE University, Segovia, who had just returned from Milan, was admitted to Hospital General de Segovia, and an engineer from Iran, working in Valladolid.
- In the Valencian Community, a 44-year-old man from Valencia, who worked as a sportswriter and travelled to Milan's San Siro Stadium on 19 February to watch a football clash between Atalanta B.C. and Valencia CF, tested positive and was admitted to Hospital Clínico Universitario de Valencia. Two other people with whom he had contact also tested positive and were admitted to the same hospital. Two more people, who had visited the same football game in Milan, were hospitalised at the same place. A woman, who had visited Milan, was hospitalised at Hospital de Sagunto, Valencia. An Italian student studying in Valencia, who had visited Northern Italy, was admitted to Hospital Universitario Doctor Peset.

On 28 February:

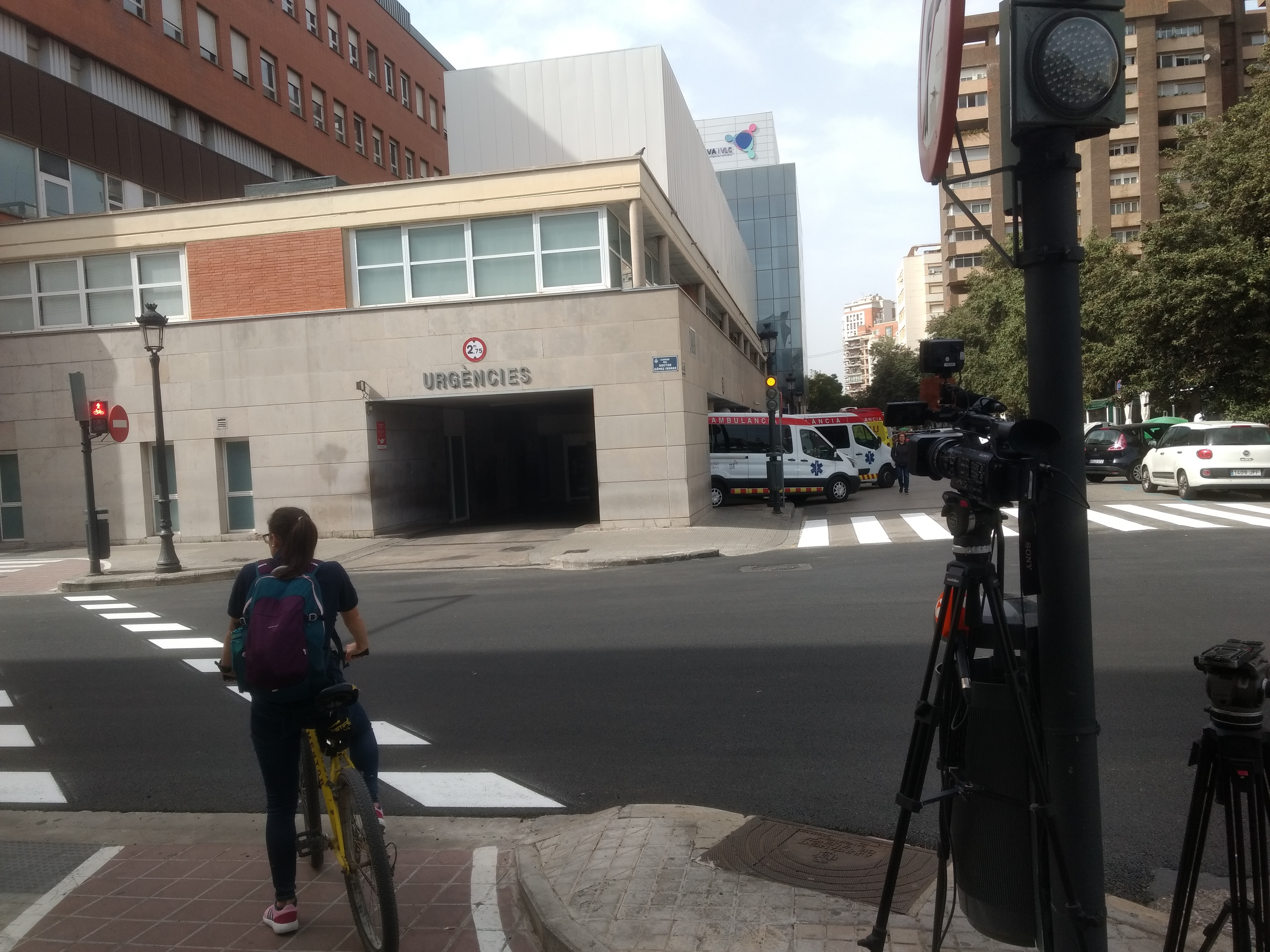
Television cameras covering the first coronavirus cases in a Hospital in Valencia.

- In Andalusia, a 28-year-old male who resides in Milan tested positive in Almería had been admitted to Hospital Mediterráneo. Another eight people tested positive: two men of 42 and 53 years and an 81-year-old woman in Marbella, a 25-year-old nurse from Arjonilla who treated a person who was positive for coronavirus at the Torrejón de Ardoz Hospital, a 58-year-old Sevillian doctor and two men aged 42 and 53 years and a 55-year-old woman in Fuengirola.
- The Community of Madrid confirmed the fifth positive case of coronavirus at the Infanta Sofía University Hospital in the town of San Sebastián de los Reyes involving a 66-year-old man.
- Following the discovery of a COVID-19 case involving a Spanish sportswriter who went to Milan for the game of 2019–2020 UEFA Champions League Round of 16 against Atalanta B.C., Valencia CF announced the suspension of all non-sports indoor events such as news conferences.

On 29 February:

- In Andalusia, two new suspicious cases tested positive in Fuengirola involving two men aged 59 and 62 years old residing in the province of Málaga, increasing to a total of ten cases.
- The first positive in Asturias was reported.
- On the Balearic Islands, a new positive case was confirmed, a woman in Mallorca who remains isolated at the Son Espases University Hospital.
- In the Basque Country the first case was reported.
- In Cantabria, the first case involving a person who travelled to Italy tested positive.
- Two more cases were confirmed in Catalonia: one in Girona and the other in Sant Cugat del Vallès.
- The first case in Navarre was reported.

== March ==
1 March 2020

- In Andalusia two young infected doctors increased the number of Andalusian cases to 12.
- In the Basque Country another four cases were reported, three originated from previous positive contacts in the province of Álava, while one from Gipuzkoa was a healthcare professional and did not have any relationship or history of risk.
- In Castilla–La Mancha the first case of coronavirus was confirmed, a 62-year-old male from the province of Guadalajara.
- In Castile and León, one case was reported of a 62-year-old truck driver who had travelled to Milan two weeks before and tested positive for coronavirus at El Bierzo Hospital.
- Extremadura announced the first four cases, a 56-year-old male in Coria, a 56-year-old man in Cáceres also and two males of 58 years and another of 19 in Llerena-Zafra.

2 March 2020

- In the Basque Country, another healthcare worker was reported infected in Álava province, bringing the number of cases to 10.
- In Cantabria, nine new cases originating from people who travelled to Italy increased the total cases there 10 cases in the community.
- Castilla–La Mancha announced two new cases: men of 23 and 30 years of age, both imported cases, with an epidemiological link with the risk zone of northern Italy and who were being treated in the Almansa and Albacete hospitals.
- In Castile and León five new cases in one day brought the total to eight people affected by coronavirus in the region. Three in Leon, of which one was a policeman from León who had been taking a statement from two Korean citizens with an active cough, a 19-year-old student of the University of Salamanca, and a 52-year-old man from La Rioja in the province of Burgos.
- Catalonia reported three more positive cases to the list: two 16 and 20-year-old women residing in Girona who had travelled to northern Italy between 14 and 16 February. The third case is a 28-year-old man living in Barcelona who had travelled to Milan from 20 to 23 February.
- Two new positives in Extremadura, two women aged 20 and 21 from Badajoz, increased the total to 6.
- Positive cases of coronavirus increased to 29 in the Community of Madrid, after an initial erroneous report that reported the figure as 32 in a press conference by the director of the Centre for Coordination of Health Alerts and Emergencies of the Ministry of Health, Fernando Simón.
- In Navarre, a second positive case was reported of a man aged 34, who was a family member of the admitted woman.
- In La Rioja the first case was confirmed.

3 March 2020

- Another infected person was reported in Málaga, Andalusia, with a total of 13 reported cases.
- The second and third positives in Asturias were reported, amounting to 3 cases.
- In the Balearic Islands a third positive case was confirmed.
- In the Basque Country three more positives, two new infected in Álava, and the first one from Biscay, raising the total positives to 13, 10 in Álava, 2 in Gipuzkoa and 1 in Biscay.
- In Castilla–La Mancha there were four new cases reported, bringing the total up to seven, two in the province of Guadalajara and another two in the province of Toledo.
- A new case in Catalonia, a 38-year-old tourist who had been in Milan, reaching 18 infected people.
- In the Community of Madrid 27 new positive cases of coronavirus bring the total up to 56, with five serious in intensive care.
- In La Rioja the second case of coronavirus was confirmed, a man who was in contact with the person who is part of the health staff of the Txagorritxu Hospital (Vitoria-Gasteiz, Álava) that was confirmed as the first case in the community.
- In the Valencian Community the number of infected rises to 19 cases, with four new cases. After a forensic investigation, a man who had been infected with coronavirus in the Hospital Arnau de Vilanova died on 13 February in Valencia.
- The first death in Madrid took place this day; it was reported on 5 March after a forensic analysis.

4 March 2020

- In Asturias a new positive case was reported, amounting 4 cases.
- In Aragon the first case of coronavirus was confirmed, a 79-year-old man.
- In the Balearic Islands, two more confirmed cases, two young men from Sa Pobla who travelled to Bergamo, making a total of 4 active cases and one recovered.
- In the Basque Country 8 another positives bring the total positives to 21, 16 active cases in Álava, two in Gipuzkoa and three more infected and one death in Vizcaya. 250 people remain in isolation, more than of them a hundred are health professionals.
- In Castile and León three more new cases in one day bring the total to 11 affected by coronaviruses in the region: a young woman, health professional from the Basque Health Service, admitted to the Burgos University Assistance Complex, another male in Miranda de Ebro and young man from a recent trip to Italy in Segovia.
- In Castilla–La Mancha there were 5 new cases reported, bringing the total up to 12: 7 in the province of Guadalajara, 2 in Toledo, 1 in Albacete, 1 in Almansa and 1 in Tomelloso.
- 10 new cases in Catalonia, reaching a total of 28 infected people, a 23-year-old woman from Barcelona who had been on holiday in Milan, a 39-year-old man from Barcelona who had travelled to Bergamo and Milan, a 40-year-old man from Barcelona who also travelled to Milan, a 47-year-old man from Manresa who was infected by a positive from Valencia, and a 53-year-old woman and a 52-year-old man, both from Girona, who have also been infected by previously confirmed cases, all these last three cases by local contact.
- In Galicia, the first case in the community was confirmed in A Coruña.
- In the Community of Madrid 20 new positive cases of coronavirus brought the total to 76, of which 41 were hospitalised and 7 in intensive care.
- Five new cases were reported in La Rioja, but one of them is counted in Burgos, Castilla y León, so the positives cases total in the community amounts to 6.
- In the Valencian Community the infected rises to 22 cases, with four new cases and one of the previous day discarded, 3 of them in the province of Alicante.

5 March 2020

- In Andalusia 4 new cases were reported, a 17-year-old girl in Málaga at the Santa Rosa de Lima school who returned last week from a study trip to Italy, a 23-year-old woman and a 37-year-old woman in Seville and a 41-year-old woman in Alhaurín de la Torre, bringing the total to 17 active cases and not 16 as reported by the media.
- In Asturias a new positive case in Gijón, a 48-year-old male related to the Torrejón de Ardoz cluster (Madrid), was reported, amounting 5 cases.
- In the Balearic Islands, one more positive male, making a total of 5 active cases and one recovered.
- In the Basque Country 6 another positives, raising the total positives to 27.
- In the Canary Islands two new cases (a female Italian tourist in Gran Canaria and an Italian tourist in San Cristobal de la Laguna) and a recovery of a person (an hotel guest of H10 Costa Adeje Palace) were reported, raising the total to 8 active cases and 3 recoveries.
- In Castile and León two new cases in Tamames, province of Salamanca, and Valladolid, raise the total positives to 13.
- In Castilla–La Mancha 1 new case in Guadalajara was reported, raising the total to 13.
- In Catalonia, 4 new positive cases of coronavirus increase to 32 in total.
- In Galicia, the second positive in the community, a 43-year-old male admitted to the Álvaro Cunqueiro de Vigo Hospital was confirmed in Vigo.
- In the Community of Madrid, 13 new positive cases of coronavirus increase to 89 in total and, after a forensic investigation, it is discovered that a 99-year-old woman died in Madrid on 3 March due to coronavirus, becoming the third confirmed death in Spain.
- In Navarra a third case was announced, making a total of 3 cases and not 4 as the media account, since one is hospitalised and accounted for in the Basque Country.
- In La Rioja 4 new positive cases of coronavirus brought the total to 10. Subsequently, that same afternoon the figure was increased to 17 cases.
- In the Valencian Community the infected rises to 30 cases, with 8 new cases in Castellón, Elche, Orihuela, and Valencia.

6 March 2020

- In Andalusia 5 new cases were reported, a 63-year-old woman in Malaga who had recently travelled to Italy, a 48-year-old woman in Baeza (Jaén) who has recently travelled to Italy, a 78-year-old man in Jaén, a 74-year-old man in Marbella admitted to the Costa del Sol Hospital and a 72-year-old man in Torremolinos who is admitted to the Vithas Xánit Internacional hospital in Malaga, totalling 22 active cases.
- In Aragon the second case of coronavirus was confirmed, an 87-year-old man admitted to the hospital at the Nuestra Señora de Gracia Hospital in Zaragoza, who died a few hours later. Another 8 were reported, rising the total to 9 active cases and 1 deceased.
- Asturias adds two new positive cases, related to the 48-year-old man with epidemiological link to the cluster of Torrejón de Ardoz (Madrid), amounting 7 active cases.
- In the Balearic Islands, one more case test positive, a male admitted to the Can Misses Hospital, making a total of 6 active cases and one recovered.
- In Basque Country 18 another positives, 13 new positives in Álava and 5 in Biscay, raising the total positives to 45.
- In Canary Islands a new case is reported, a male in San Cristobal de la Laguna, Tenerife. Another three Italian female tourist and another person in Tenerife tested positive, raising the total to 13 active cases and 3 recoveries, 9 of them in Tenerife and 4 in Gran Canaria.
- In Cantabria a new case, a "young person" who has been infected in the Basque Country, which currently records a total of 11 cases in the community.
- In Castile and León a new case in Burgos, a young woman, raise the total positives to 14.
- In Castilla–La Mancha 2 new cases in Guadalajara were reported, rising the total to 15, distributed in Guadalajara with ten confirmed cases, Toledo two, Albacete one, Almansa one and Tomelloso one.
- In Catalonia, 5 new positive cases of coronavirus, a 29-year-old woman who is in serious condition, a 19-year-old girl in Barcelona, a 57-year-old man in Cabrils (Barcelona), a 35-year-old woman in Barcelona and a 55-year-old woman in Barcelona who travelled to Milan, increase to 37 in total.
- In Galicia, the third and fourth positives in the community, a 15-year-old and a 47-year-old woman admitted to the Álvaro Cunqueiro de Vigo Hospital were confirmed in Vigo.
- In the Community of Madrid, 46 new positive cases of coronavirus in Valdemoro increase to 134 active cases and 4 deaths in total, including a 76-year-old man with previous pathologies who died at the Infanta Elena Hospital of Valdemoro, the fourth confirmed death in Spain, other 91 years old man dead at the Gregorio Marañón Hospital and another 83 years old man deceased at the Severo Ochoa Hospital in Leganés.
- In La Rioja 21 new positive cases of coronavirus increase to 38 in total.
- A new positive case, a man admitted to the University General Hospital of Alicante who travelled to northern Italy and a 31-year-old person from Burriana discharged, giving a total of 30 active cases in the Valencian Community.
- The Spanish Episcopal Conference indicated that churches should remove the holy water from the pillars, avoid the gesture of shaking hands as a way of giving peace, and not kiss religious images, a typical gesture in Lent.

7 March

- A student of Colegio Santa María de los Rosales in Madrid tested positive for the coronavirus. This is the college where Leonor, Princess of Asturias, heir presumptive to the throne of Spain and her sister Infanta Sofía study. The Royal Household of Spain announced that the daughters of the King would attend classes when they resume on Monday.
- In La Rioja, Haro was put on lockdown.

8 March

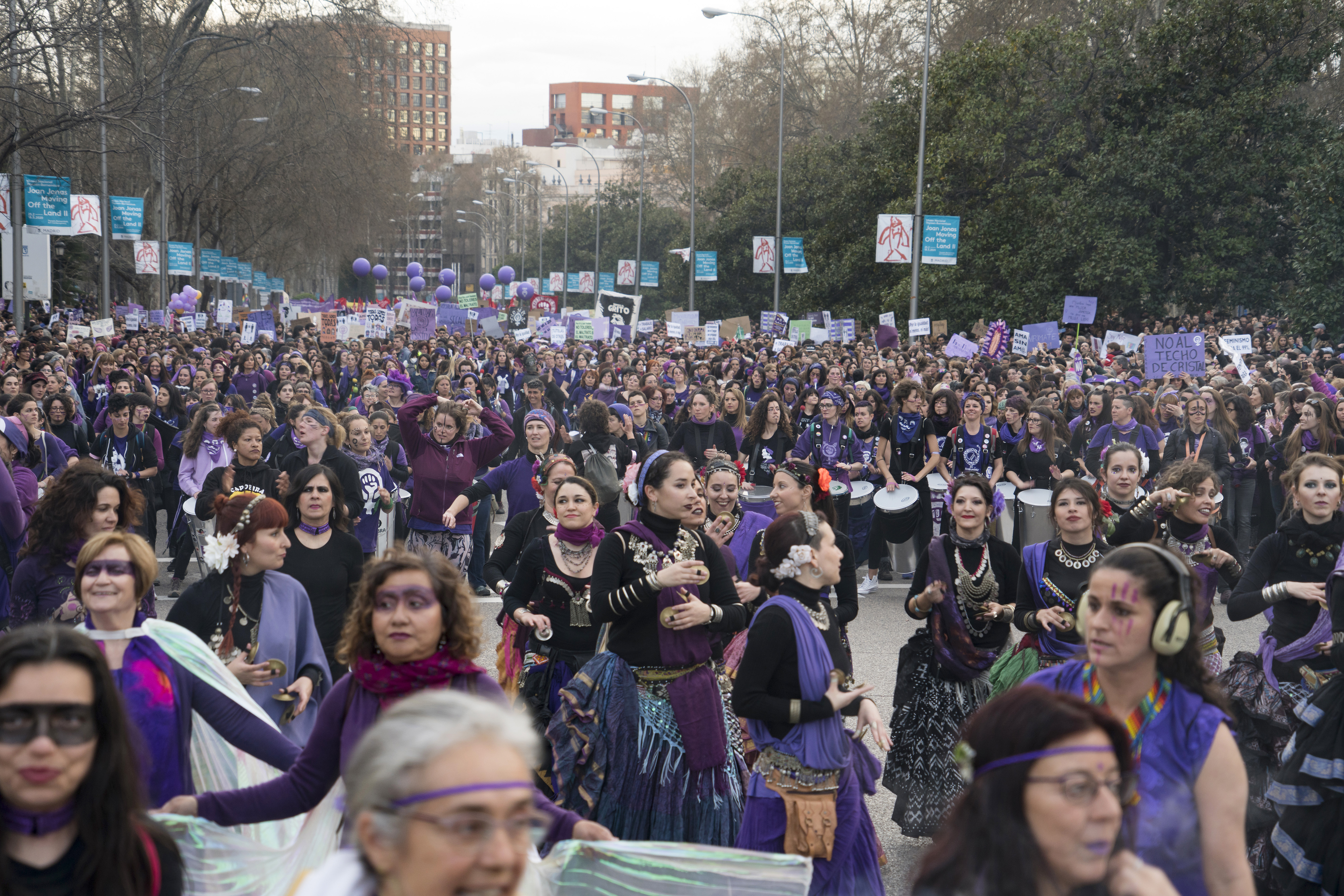
International Women's Day march in Madrid, 8 March 2020

- Seven more people were confirmed to have died.
- First case diagnosed in the Region of Murcia.

9 March

- The confirmed cases rose to 1,231 and the death toll to 30.
- In Barcelona, a kindergarten is closed amid a worker testing positive and three members of the City Council, including First Deputy Mayor Jaume Collboni self-isolating.
- The Catalan Ministry of Health reported two new deaths in Catalonia.
- The Basque government announced the closure of all schools in the municipalities of Vitoria and Labastida.
- President of the regional government of Madrid, Isabel Díaz Ayuso, announced the cancellation of classes in the Autonomous community of Madrid at all educational levels due to the strong increase in cases in the region, a measure that would affect more than 1.5 million students.

10 March

- First death confirmed in La Rioja.
- The regional government of La Rioja announced the suspension of classes for a period of two weeks.
- Javier Ortega Smith, General Secretary of the far-right Vox, third political force in Spanish parliament, tests positive.
- After Ortega Smith tested positive for COVID-19, the Congress of Deputies and the Senate suspended its parliamentary activity for a period of a week and 52 Vox's lawmakers are asked to stay at home.
- All direct flights between Spanish and Italian airports suspended until 25 March.
- The first cases in province of Tarragona are confirmed; two in Cambrils and two others in Salou.
- An elderly woman from Castellserà becomes the first case in Province of Lleida, making all Catalan provinces with cases.
- The Constitutional Court suspended its activity for the following two days. The Royal Spanish Academy also suspends its plenary sessions.
- The Royal Household announced that the King's agenda of the week was suspended, except for an official visit to France the following day.
- The Conference of rectors of Madrid public universities (CRUMA) decided to delay the academic calendar, classes, exams and enrollments by two weeks.
- Spanish Government suspends events with more than one thousand attendants in Madrid, La Rioja and Vitoria.
- The Valencian Government decides to postpone the Falles of Valencia for the fifth time in its history and the Magdalena, in Castellón.

11 March

- The Catalan government followed the steps of the Spanish government taken the previous day and suspended events with more than one thousand attendees in the region.
- Madrid cancelled the main tribute in honour of the 11-M terrorist attacks in Atocha.
- First death reported in Extremadura.
- A second national deputy of the far-right Vox that did not have any contact with the first one tests positive for COVID-19.
- The Assembly of Madrid, regional parliament of Madrid, suspended its activities for a period of 15 days, after Ortega Smith had tested positive.
- The Parliament of Andalusia, regional parliament of Andalusia, suspended its activities for a week after a deputy in the regional chamber from Vox was confirmed positive.
- Ana Pastor, second vice-president of the Spanish Congress, former President of the Congress and former Minister of Health and of Public Works, announced she was affected by the coronavirus.
- A woman in El Vendrell becomes the fifth case in the province of Tarragona.
- Ana Vega, Vox's spokesperson in the Valencian Corts, announces she is positive in COVID-19, becoming the fourth elected politician of the far-right party infected.
- Minister of Health of the Basque government, Nekane Murga, announces the closure of all schools in the Álava, after 12 pupils were affected by COVID-19. The measure will affect more than 60,000 students.
- Spanish Ministry of Culture orders in Madrid the closing of all ministry dependent centres, including the museums of El Prado, Reina Sofía, Thyssen, the Spanish Filmoteca Española, Archaeological and Anthropological museums, as well as the National Library and the Royal Palace among others.
- The 2020 Copa del Rey Final – the national football cup final due to be held in Seville on 18 April between two teams from the Basque Country – was postponed on the assumption that it would have been cancelled or played in an empty stadium, in the hope that a solution would be found in the coming weeks to allow supporters to attend the important event as normal. No rescheduled date for the fixture was proposed at that point.

12 March

- The Autonomous City of Melilla suspended the passage of Moroccan goods carriers to avoid crowds on its frontier.
- Spanish Minister of Equality, Irene Montero, tests positive for COVID-19, resulting in her and her husband, Second Deputy Prime Minister of Spain Pablo Iglesias, being placed under quarantine, thus becoming the highest-ranking Spanish officials to be confirmed with the disease, which prompted Moncloa palace to announce a coronavirus testing for the remaining members of the Spanish government.
- First two cases reported in the island of La Palma.
- The regional governments of Murcia, Galicia, Catalonia, the Basque Country, Asturias, Aragon, Canary Islands, Castile-La Mancha, Navarre, Extremadura, Balearic Islands, Cantabria and the city of Melilla announced the cancellation of classes at all educational levels in their respective regions, making a total of 14 out of 17 autonomous communities and one of the autonomous cities with cancelled classes.
- The King and Queen of Spain underwent a test after Queen consort Letizia had been in contact with Irene Montero on 6 March.
- Mayor of Barcelona Ada Colau announces she is in preventive quarantine.
- The Spanish Cortes Generales suspend their activity for a period of 15 days.
- Traffic between Morocco and Spain is suspended.
- The Ministry of the Interior decided to isolate its 69 jails.
- Carmen Leyte, Spanish Senator of the conservative People's Party in representation of Ourense tests positive for COVID-19, becoming the first member of the Senate to be affected by the disease.
- The Sagrada Familia closed for tourists and construction workers.
- Catalan Government orders the confinement of the city of Igualada and the towns of Vilanova del Camí, Òdena and Santa Margarida de Montbui after Igualada Hospital became a contagion focus. This first measure in Spain will affect 70,000 people during 14 days.
- IBEX 35 falls 14% in its worst drop in history in a single day.
- Nationwide closure of schools after all Autonomous Communities order it. More than 10 million students (1 million from university and 9 million from schools) ordered to stay at home for a period of two weeks.
- Leader of Vox Santiago Abascal and spokesperson of Vox in the Congress Macarena Olona confirm they have both tested positive in COVID-19.
- Spanish Minister of Territorial Policy and Civil Service Carolina Darias tested as positive.
- Two cases of the virus are confirmed in the autonomous city of Melilla.
- The Liga de Fútbol Profesional announced that La Liga and the Segunda División (the top two leagues of football in Spain) had been suspended for at least 14 days. This announcement followed Real Madrid CF's Champions League match against Manchester City F.C. being postponed, due to the Real Madrid players being put into quarantine. A Real Madrid basketball player had tested positive for the virus, and the Real Madrid football players were feared at risk as well due to sharing training facilities with their basketball team.

13 March

- Mayor of Madrid, José Luis Martínez Almeida, ordered the closure of bars and terraces in the capital, and announced that his government is prepared, if needed, to isolate the city.
- Beatriz Jiménez Linuesa, deputy of the People's Party, confirms she has tested positive, which makes a total of 7 deputies and 1 senator infected by the disease.
- The Basque Country announced a declaration of sanitary emergency in the region, which allows population confinement.
- The first two cases are reported in the autonomous city of Melilla.
- The president of the National court announced the suspension of all the ordinary functions of this Court for 15 days, keeping only the urgent proceedings and the court on duty.
- The Queen consort Letizia Ortiz suspended her agenda for some days and self-isolates. She tested negative for COVID-19 after meeting some days before with an infected Government Minister.
- Judicial activity in the Community of Madrid, Basque Country, Igualada and Haro are suspended by an order of the General Council of the Judiciary.
- The government of Murcia announced the confinement of more than 500,000 people in coastal municipalities.
- All provinces of Spain confirmed at least one positive after cases are confirmed in: Ávila, Cuenca, Huesca, Palencia and Soria, leaving the Autonomous City of Ceuta and the islands of El Hierro and Formentera as the only territories without cases reported.
- Prime Minister of Spain Pedro Sánchez announced a declaration of the constitutional state of alarm in the nation for a period of 15 days, to become effective the following day after the approval of the Council of Ministers.
- Doñana National Park, Santiago de Compostela Cathedral and Tower of Hercules closed for visitors and activities.
- Catalonia reported 190 new cases in the highest rise in cases in a day.
- Adriana Lastra, spokesperson of the PSOE, self-isolated after one of her collaborators tested positive, although she announced that she had no symptoms.
- From Saturday, Asturias, Catalonia, Cantabria, Galicia and Madrid closed all shops except those selling food and basic necessities.
- Vicepresident of Castile and León, Francisco Igea, announced the suspension of the Holy Week festivities in the region after talks with the regional administration.
- President of the Balearic Islands, Francina Armengol, asked the Prime Minister to suspend traffic between the mainland and the islands.
- President of Catalonia, Quim Torra, asked the Prime Minister to authorise the closure of all Catalonia's ports, airports and railways.
- It was reported that on 11 March 2020 former Secretary General of NATO and former High Representative of the Union for Foreign Affairs and Security Policy Javier Solana, had been admitted to the hospital after being infected by COVID-19.
- In Extremadura, Arroyo de la Luz was put on lockdown.

14 March

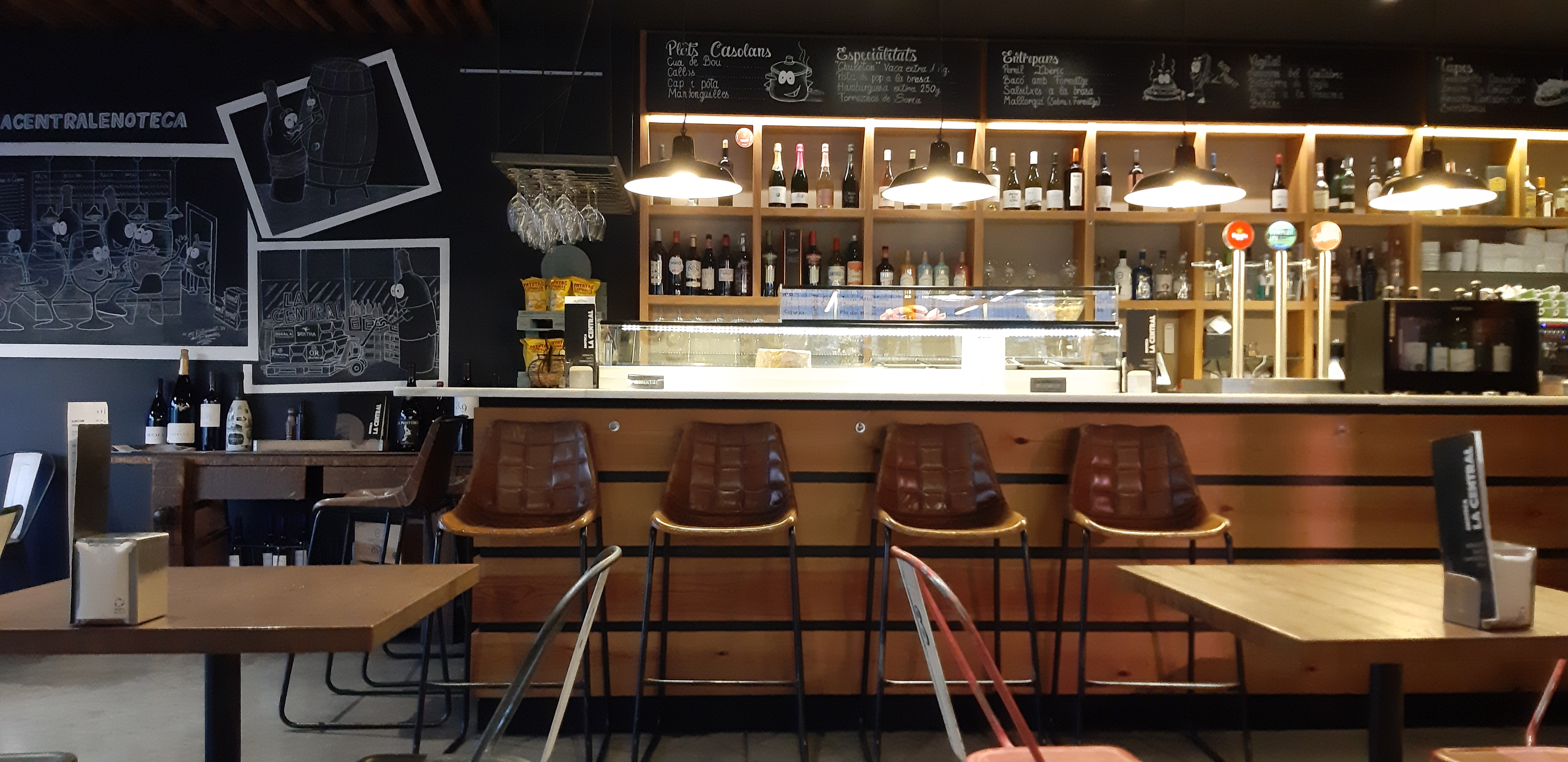
Vilafranca del Penedès bar closed due to the coronavirus

- Vox Deputy Antonio Salvá tested positive for COVID-19.
- Seville, Granada and Cordoba City Councils, as well as the Region of Murcia, officially cancelled the Holy Week festivities.
- First death reported in Galicia.
- The regional governments of Murcia and the Basque Country close all shops except those selling food and basic necessities.
- The Mayor of Madrid closes parks and public gardens.
- The Spanish government imposes a nationwide lockdown, bans all trips that are not force majeure and announces it may intervene in companies to guarantee supplies.
- Other provinces start to announce the cancellation of the Holy Week festivities.
- Begoña Gómez, Prime Minister's wife, tests positive for COVID-19.

15 March

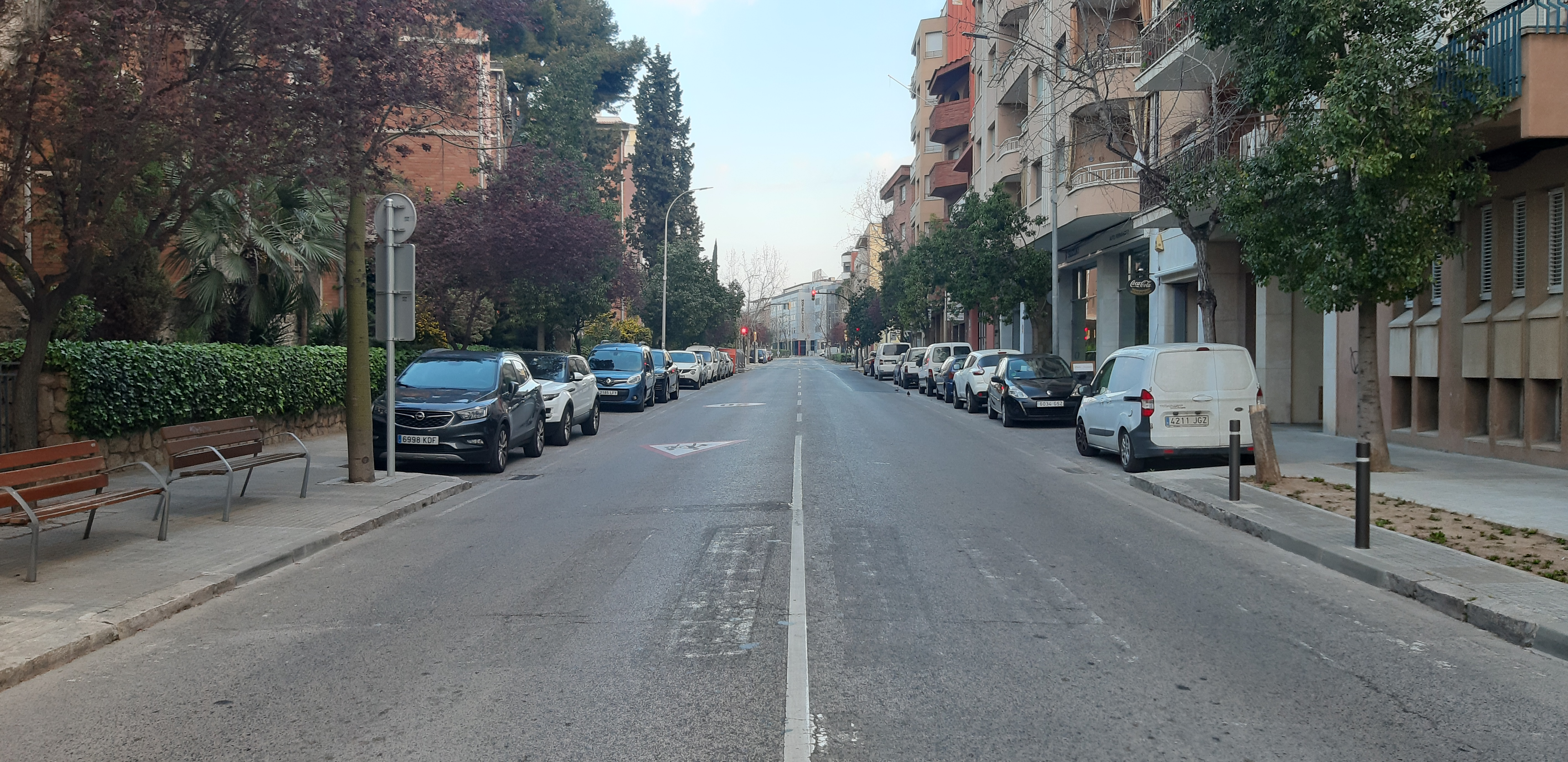
Deserted streets in Vilafranca del Penedès.

- First case in the autonomous city of Ceuta, a student from Madrid.
- Seville's Feria de Abril is postponed to September for the first time in its history.
- Ombudsman of Catalonia Rafael Ribó and Catalan Vice President Pere Aragonès test positive for the virus.
- Valencia CF announces five cases of coronavirus; footballers Ezequiel Garay, Eliaquim Mangala and José Gayà, and one member of the technical team and one doctor.
- In response to the increasing number of cases of the COVID-19 pandemic, the Spanish government declared a State of Alarm and announced the imposition of a national lockdown starting on 15 March as part of emergency measures to combat the coronavirus outbreak in the country. All residents are mandated to remain in their normal residences except to purchase food and medicines, work or attend emergencies. Lockdown restrictions also mandated the temporary closure of non-essential shops and businesses, including bars, restaurants, cafes, cinemas and commercial and retail businesses, while also announcing that the government will be able to take over private healthcare providers, if needed. The announcement came following significant increases in the number of confirmed cases of COVID-19 in Spain, increasing by 66% from 3,146 cases to 5,232 cases on 13 March 2020. The "extraordinary decision", according to the PM Pedro Sánchez, is necessary as Spain deals with a "health, social and economic crisis".

16 March

- President of the Community of Madrid, Isabel Díaz Ayuso, who presides over the most affected region, becomes the first regional president to test positive for the virus.
- Basque elections, scheduled for 5 April, are delayed until the crisis is overcome, after an agreement between all the political parties represented in the Basque parliament.
- President of the Government of Catalonia Quim Torra, who presides over the second-most affected region, also tested positive for coronavirus.
- Galician elections, also scheduled for 5 April, were delayed until the crisis had been resolved.
- Minister of the Interior Grande-Marlaska announced the closing of Spanish frontiers to be in effect from 12 pm on 16 March, only authorising the entry of Spanish citizens and those that prove cause of force majeure or situation of need. The entry restrictions will have no effect on the transport of merchandise to guarantee the supply chain. It will not affect foreign diplomatic personnel either.

17 March

- The first death in the province of Tarragona is confirmed in Valls hospital, an 88-year-old woman from Badalona.
- The Selectividad (Spanish University Access Tests), scheduled in June for more than 300,000 students, were delayed until further notice.
- President of the Government of the Balearic Islands, Francina Armengol, announced that after receiving the approval of the Spanish government, her government would proceed to the closure of all airports and ports in the region, with "a few exceptions".
- PM Pedro Sánchez announces a support package of more than 200 billion euros, almost 20% of the Spanish GDP, to cushion the impact of the coronavirus crisis. The Royal Decree approved by his government also includes a moratorium on the payment of mortgages for workers and self-employed in economic vulnerability and for those affected by COVID-19, as well as the streamlining of temporary dismissal files (known as ERTE), support for workers and companies affected by downturns, measures to guarantee the liquidity of companies and to promote research to achieve a vaccine.
- Former President of Real Madrid Lorenzo Sanz is admitted to hospital in serious condition after testing positive for coronavirus.

18 March

- The number of infections reached 14,500 as the death toll reached more than 600.
- A donation from the Chinese government of more than 500,000 facemasks arrives in Spain.
- The Basque Minister of Education lengthened the closure of schools indefinitely.
- The Congress of Deputies met in a historic session as the Prime Minister reports on the management of the state of Alarm. In strict health security measures, only 5% of lawmakers were present.
- Former Senator and former Mayor of Badalona Xavier García Albiol tested positive for COVID-19.
- The King Felipe VI addressed a message to the nation in a special speech for the second time in his reign and the sixth by a monarch in 40 years of democracy.
- The Eurovision Song Contest 2020 was cancelled due to the coronavirus pandemic, where Blas Cantó was supposed to perform his song "Universo" in Rotterdam, representing Spain in May.

19 March

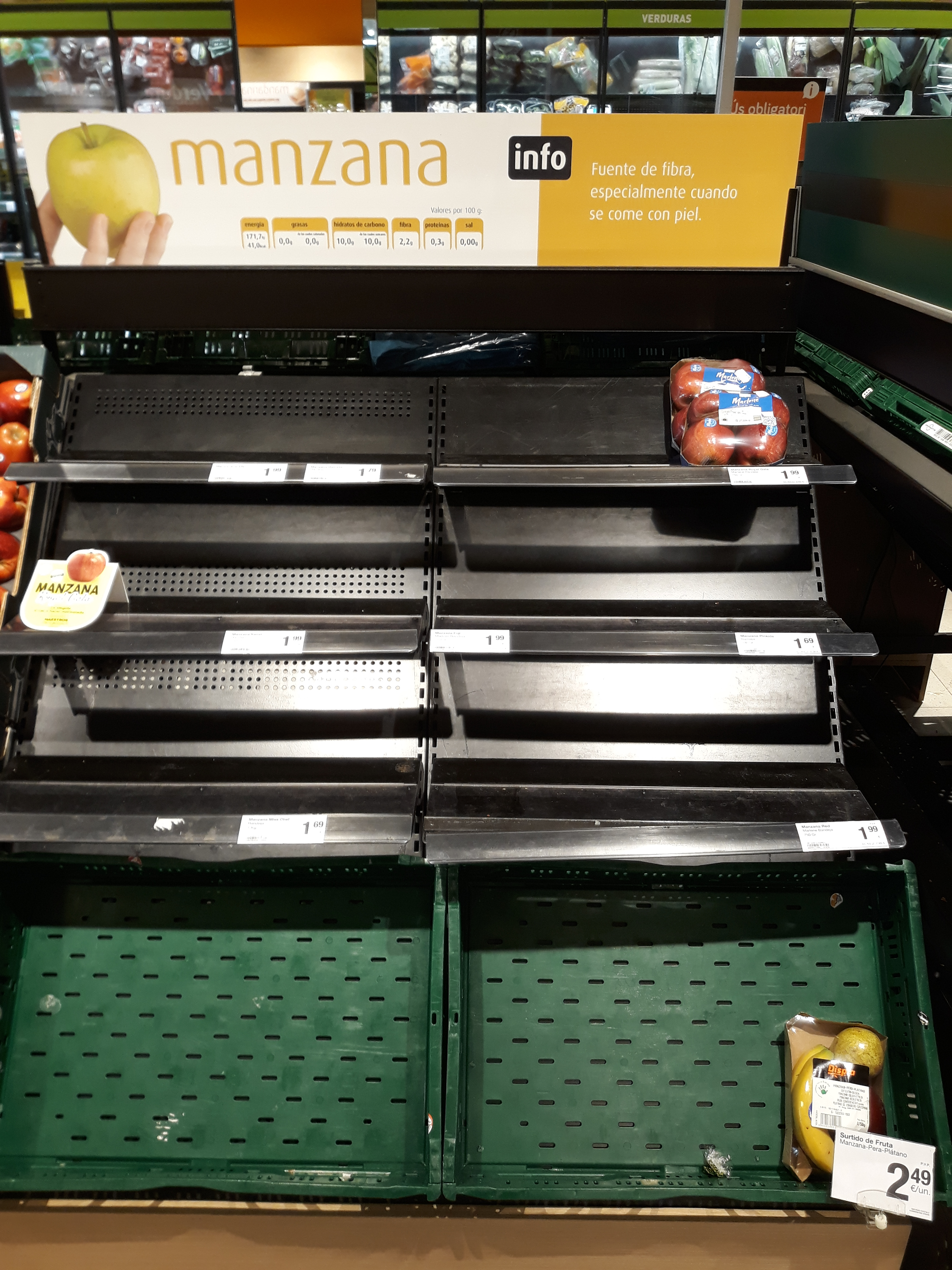
Empty shelves in a Consum supermarket on 14 March

- The Canary Islands restrict flights between the peninsula and its islands. Air and sea connections to The Balearic Islands cease due to flight companies stopping all flights.
- First reported death of a healthcare worker in the country, a nurse from the Basque Country.
- Former President of the Community of Madrid and former President of the Senate Esperanza Aguirre and her husband are hospitalised.
- Itziar Ituño, an actress known for her role as Inspector Raquel Murillo in the Spanish television series Money Heist, announced she had tested positive.

20 March

- Spain exceeds 1,000 deaths.
- First case confirmed on the island of El Hierro.
- La Liga club RCD Espanyol player Wu Lei, who originates from China, tested positive.
- Carlos Falcó, 5th Marquess of Griñón peer, socialite, entrepreneur and Grandee of Spain died from COVID-19 aged 83.

21 March

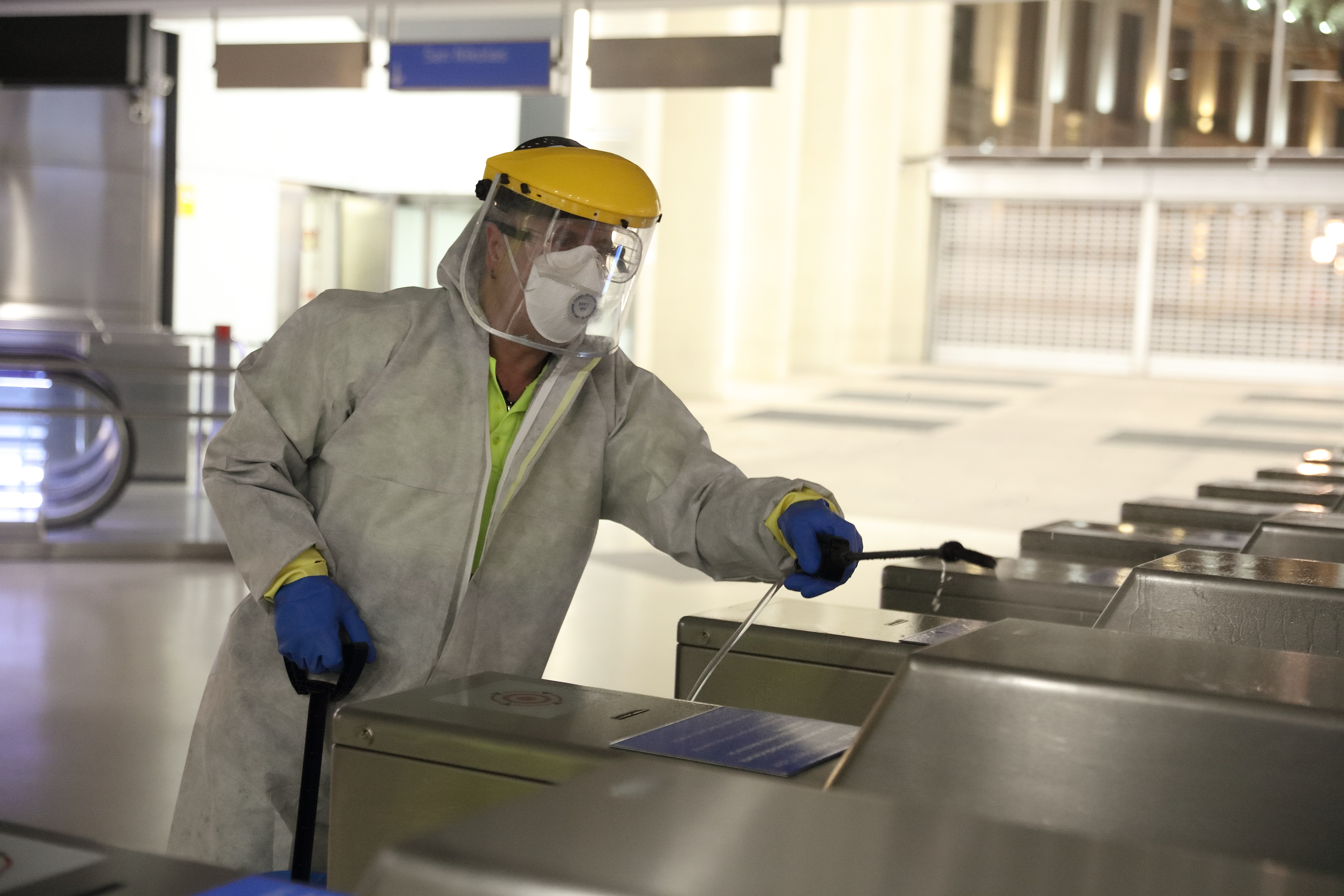
Disinfection of subway in Bilbao, Basque Country, 21 March

- The Ministry of Health announced the purchase of 640,000 rapid tests.
- Former Real Madrid president Lorenzo Sanz died of COVID-19.
- Isabel Díaz Ayuso (President of the Community of Madrid) announced that 80% of the Madrid's residents might get the disease.
- More than 350,000 tests for COVID-19 had been conducted.

22 March

- Plácido Domingo, a well-known Spanish opera singer, announced he has tested positive for COVID-19.
- Spanish PM Pedro Sánchez announces that he will take the petition to extend the State of Alarm in the nation until 11 April to the Congress after consultations with regional presidents.
- The mother and the father-in-law of the Prime Minister Pedro Sánchez are hospitalised after being infected with coronavirus.
- The President of the Region of Murcia orders the cessation of all non-essential economic activities, a decision later revoked by the central government.

23 March

- Spain adds 4,000 cases in a single day, reaching 33,000 infected and 2,182 dead.
- Romería de El Rocío, scheduled for 29 May until 1 June, and the transfer of the Virgin of El Rocío are suspended.
- José Folgado, Secretary of State for Budgets and Expenses between 1996 and 2000; for Economy, Energy and SMEs between 2000 and 2002; and for Energy, Industrial Development and SMEs since 2002 until 2004, Deputy of Congress in 2000 and from 2004 to 2008, for the People's Party, died aged 75 from COVID-19.
- Alberto Fabra, former President of the Valencian Community; Juan Cotino, former president of the Corts Valencianes and Fernando Martín Álvarez, former president of Real Madrid were admitted to an intensive care unit after testing positive for coronavirus.
- Italian actress and former Miss Italia Lucia Bosè died aged 89 from pneumonia complicated by COVID-19.
- Spanish Army found elderly people abandoned and dead inside retirement homes, according to Defence Minister Margarita Robles. A criminal investigation was launched.

24 March

- The number of deaths had risen by 514 in the previous 24 hours (a record) with 2,696 now reported to have died.
- "Palacio del Hielo", an ice rink in Madrid, begins to be used as a morgue.
- Former Minister of Defence and former President of Castile-La Mancha María Dolores de Cospedal and her husband tested positive for coronavirus. They were hospitalised a few days earlier but were without serious symptoms at home.
- Judge Baltasar Garzón and retired Argentine goalkeeper Hugo Gatti were admitted to hospital after contracting COVID-19.
- 5,400 medical professionals were confirmed to have tested positive for coronavirus and sent home, further straining the hospitals, where a lack of protective equipment has put workers at risk.
- Madrid LGBT Pride, the biggest LGBT event in Europe and planned for the month of July, is postponed until further notice.

25 March

- First Deputy Prime Minister and Minister of the Presidency, Relations with the Cortes and Democratic Memory Carmen Calvo, hospitalised since the previous Sunday, tests positive for COVID-19.

26 March

- Princess Maria Teresa of Bourbon-Parma, cousin of King Felipe VI of Spain became the first royal who died from COVID-19 on 26 March in Paris at the age of 86.

28 March

- The Spanish government halted all non-essential activity in Spain.
- The daily death toll surpassed 800, with 832 people dying in a single day,

29 March

- The first two cases of COVID-19 detected in the island of Formentera, Balearic Islands, leaving the island of La Graciosa (Canary Islands) as the only territory with no cases detected.
- Former Mayor of Barcelona Xavier Trias is admitted to hospital after testing positive for COVID-19. He was discharged on 7 April.

30 March

- Doctor Fernando Simón, the head of Spain's Centre for Health Emergencies and the public face of the government's response because of his daily briefings, is tested positive for the virus, being replaced by doctor María José Sierra.

== April ==
3 April

- 950 dead on a single day, the highest number in the world recorded over 24 hours.

4 April

- First day of overall decrease in data in a week.
- At least 6,416 hospitalised people have needed intensive care.
- Prime Minister Pedro Sánchez announces a request to the Congress of Deputies to extend the State of Alarm for two more weeks, until 26 April.

7 April

- Several hospitals report a decrease in the number of emergency room admissions and a slightly reduced demand for intensive care.

10 April

- On Good Friday night, Enrique Múgica, who was Minister of Justice between 1988 and 1991, Deputy from 1977 to 2000 and Ombudsman between 2000 and 2010 died from coronavirus at the age of 88.

20 April

- Spain surpasses more than 200,000 detected cases and registers its lowest number of deaths in a period of a month.

21 April

- Festivities of San Fermín, in Pamplona, are suspended.
- Government announces that starting on 26 April, children under 14 will be allowed to take a walk, with further conditions to be announced.
- Government fixes a maximum price of 0.96 euros per facemask.

26 April

- Children under 14 allowed to go outside, following the specified precautions and restrictions.
- Spain registers less than 300 deceased in a single day, the lowest number since more than a month.

== June ==
27 June

- Asturias became the first Autonomous Community to accumulate 14 consecutive days (a complete incubation period) without new cases, thus being named as a "COVID-free Community".
