= Reinhard Busse =

German physician and health economist

- Born: March 1963 (age 63)
- Education: University of Marburg (Dr. med., 1992); Hannover Medical School (M.S.P., 1993)
- Known for: Healthcare management; Health services research; Health economics
- Scientific career
- Workplaces: Technische Universität Berlin; Charité

Reinhard Busse (born 26 March 1963) is a German physician and health economist. He is a university professor at Technische Universität Berlin, where he has, since 2002, headed the Department of Healthcare Management at the Faculty of Economics and Management.

He is the current scientific director and a founding member of the Berlin Centre of Health Economics Research (BerlinHECOR) and a faculty member of the Charité - Universitätsmedizin Berlin. He is also Co-director and head of the Berlin hub of the European Observatory on Health Systems and Policies. His department has been designated as a WHO Collaborating Centre for Health Systems Research and Management. And he is the director of the Observatory's annual summer school in Venice.

In addition, Busse is a member of several scientific advisory boards and a regular consultant for national health and research institutions in Germany and various international organizations, such as World Health Organization (WHO), the European Commission, the World Bank, and the OECD.

His research focuses on comparative health system analysis, health services research, health economics, and health technology assessment (HTA).

Busse also supports the rigorous training of public health professionals globally through his teaching and other activities. From 2015 to 2018, he acted as speaker of the board of directors of the Berlin School of Public Health, a new collaborative initiative of three Berlin Universities. More recently, he supports the School of Public Health at Kwame Nkrumah University of Science and Technology in Kumasi, Ghana.

He has been editor-in-chief of the international peer-reviewed journal Health Policy since 2011.

Since 2013, the Frankfurter Allgemeine Zeitung (F.A.Z) has ranked him among Germany's most influential economists. In 2017 and 2018, he reached 8th and 11th place, respectively, highest among health economists.

Busse is the author of myriad publications, including journal articles, book chapters and books.

== Early life and education ==
Busse was born in Hamelin in the German state of Lower Saxony. After finishing high school in Bad Nenndorf, Lower Saxony, he completed his civilian service as a paramedic and ambulance driver. In 1984, he began his medical studies at the Philipps University in Marburg. He went on to study at Harvard Medical School and the United Medical and Dental Schools of Guy's and St Thomas' Hospitals (University of London), finishing in 1990. In addition to a doctorate in medicine (Dr. med.), Busse has a master's degree in population medicine and public health (Magister sanitatis publicae; M.S.P.). He was granted a lifelong medical license to practice as a physician in 1994 and in 1999 he successfully completed a habilitation in epidemiology, social medicine and health system research at the Hannover Medical School.

== Career ==
From 1991 to 1992, Busse worked as a research associate under German teacher, pediatric neurologist, and epilepsy researcher, Dieter Scheffner, in the planning group for the reform of medical training in Berlin (Reformstudiengang Medizin) at the Rudolf Virchow Hospital, Free University of Berlin. He then went on to conduct research and medical work in the Department of Rheumatology at the Center for Internal Medicine and Dermatology of the Hannover Medical School. After, he became a research fellow and physician in the Department of Epidemiology, Social Medicine and Health Systems Research under the direction of Friedrich Wilhelm Schwartz at the Center for Public Health, Hannover Medical School. While there, he was also head of the unit for Health Systems Research.

From 1996 to 1997, Busse was a visiting fellow in the Department of Health at the London School of Economics and Political Science. From 1999 to 2002, he held a visiting professorship at the Escuela Nacional de Sanidad in Madrid, Spain, and was the head of the Madrid Hub of the European Observatory on Health Care Systems. Busse has been a university professor of healthcare management at Technische Universität Berlin since 2002. His department currently comprises around 30 research fellows and four administrative employees, with whom he collaborates and oversees national and international projects.

== Other activities ==
Busse has been or is a member of various standing and ad-hoc commissions, including WHO, the European Commission, the World Bank, the OECD, the (German) Academy of Sciences Leopoldina, the German Council of Science and Humanities, the German Bundestag (Parliament), the German Ministry of Health, the German Medical Association, the German Institute for Quality and Efficiency in Health Care, the Federal Association of Statutory Health Insurance Funds, the National Association of Statutory Health Insurance Physicians, and different sickness funds.

From 2020 to 2021, Busse – following an appointment by the World Health Organization's Regional Office for Europe – served on the scientific advisory board to the Pan-European Commission on Health and Sustainable Development, chaired by Mario Monti.

== Awards ==
Since 2013, Busse has been ranked in the F.A.Z. economist list of "Germany's most influential economists", reaching 8th and 11th position in 2017 and 2018, respectively, the highest among health economists.

== Research interests ==
Busse's research is interdisciplinary, bridging medicine, economics, politics, and public health, aimed at combining methodological advancement and policy-relevance. He links these fields of research to make clear policy recommendations, including his recommendation of significantly reducing hospital locations and the number of hospital beds in Germany, while still retaining the clinical staffing levels, which would significantly improve quality of care.

Busse's primary research areas are: health systems, health services, health economics, and health technology assessment (HTA).

Health systems: Busse's work has had a particular emphasis on reforms in Germany, the systematic and comparative description and evaluation (performance assessment) of other countries health systems, including those in Central and Eastern Europe, as well as research about the design of social insurance systems, benefit baskets and the tension between market and regulation in the international and national contexts. He also researches the role of the EU in the health care sector. Beyond thematic areas, Busse's research has also focused on the methods of comparative health systems analysis. In this regard, his work has helped advance international health system research. The Coverage Cube, designed by Busse, is used worldwide to describe Universal Health Coverage (see Goal 3 of Sustainable Development Goals).

Health services: Busse focuses on the design and effect of payment mechanisms, in particular Diagnosis-related groups (DRG-systems), quality of care, models of integrated care and the role of nursing staff, among other things on its impact on patient outcomes, a line of study he has developed since the 1990s.

Health economics: Busse's health economics research centers on the assessment of health systems, in general, and of health technologies such as pharmaceuticals and medical devices, in particular.

HTA: Busse's work on developing methods to appropriately and effectively assess health technologies has been instrumental in this area of activity. For example, the methodology used across Europe today was informed by Busse's publication from 2002, entitled BEST PRACTICE IN UNDERTAKING AND REPORTING HEALTH TECHNOLOGY ASSESSMENTS: Working Group 4 Report).

== Excerpt of other activities and memberships ==
- 2003: Elected to the Fellowship of the Faculty for Public Health of the Royal College of Physicians of the United Kingdom
- 2006–2009: Dean of the Faculty VII Economics and Management, Technische Universität Berlin
- 2007–2008: Member of the Ministry of Health-appointed Scientific Advisory Board on the further development of the risk structure compensation (until the collective resignation of the Advisory Board in 2008)
- 2009–2011: Principal investigator (coordinator) of the EU-funded project "EuroDRG: Diagnosis-Related Groups in Europe: towards Efficiency and Quality"
- Since 2011: Editor-in-chief of the international peer-reviewed journal Health Policy
- Since 2012: Head of the German Federal Ministry of Education and Research-funded Berlin Centre of Health Economics Research (BerlinHECOR)
- 2016–2017: Chairman of the German Association for Health Economics

In addition, from 2015 to 2018, Busse acted as speaker of the board of directors of the then newly established inter-university Berlin School of Public Health (BSPH), involving Alice Salomon University of Applied Sciences Berlin, Charité, and Technische Universität Berlin, and aimed at training a new generation of public health professionals in Germany and the world. Busse was instrumental in setting up and designing the BSPH's public health master's program. Since 2017, Busse has supported the School of Public Health at Kwame Nkrumah University of Science and Technology (KNUST) in Kumasi, Ghana, in setting up a new master's program in Health Systems' Research and Management.

== Selected publications ==
- Busse, Reinhard; Blümel, Miriam; Knieps, Franz; Bärnighausen, Till (August 2017). "Statutory health insurance in Germany: a health system shaped by 135 years of solidarity, self-governance, and competition". The Lancet. 390 (10097): 882–897. doi:10.1016/S0140-6736(17)31280-1. PMID 28684025.
- Pross, Christoph; Geissler, Alexander; Busse, Reinhard (March 2017). "Measuring, Reporting, and Rewarding Quality of Care in 5 Nations: 5 Policy Levers to Enhance Hospital Quality Accountability". The Milbank Quarterly. 95 (1): 136–183. doi:10.1111/1468-0009.12248. PMC 5339388. PMID 28266076.
- Busse, Reinhard; Schreyögg, Jonas; Stargardt, Tom (2017). Management im Gesundheitswesen: Das Lehrbuch für Studium und Praxis [Healthcare Management: The textbook for study and practice] (in German). Springer-Verlag. ISBN 978-3-662-55024-3.
- Blümel, Miriam; Busse, Reinhard (2014). "Germany: Health system review". Health Systems in Transition. 16 (2): 1–296. hdl:10665/130246. PMID 25115137.
- Busse, Reinhard; Stahl, Juliane (September 2014). "Integrated Care Experiences And Outcomes In Germany, The Netherlands, And England". Health Affairs. 33 (9): 1549–1558. doi:10.1377/hlthaff.2014.0419. PMID 25201659.
- Aiken, Linda H; Sloane, Douglas M; Bruyneel, Luk; Van den Heede, Koen; Griffiths, Peter; Busse, Reinhard; Diomidous, Marianna; Kinnunen, Juha; Kózka, Maria; Lesaffre, Emmanuel; McHugh, Matthew D; Moreno-Casbas, M T; Rafferty, Anne Marie; Schwendimann, Rene; Scott, P Anne; Tishelman, Carol; van Achterberg, Theo; Sermeus, Walter (May 2014). "Nurse staffing and education and hospital mortality in nine European countries: a retrospective observational study". The Lancet. 383 (9931): 1824–1830. doi:10.1016/S0140-6736(13)62631-8. PMC 4035380. PMID 24581683.
- Busse, Reinhard; Perleth, Matthias; Zentner, Annette; Gerhardus, Ansgar; Gibis, Bernhard; Lühmann, Dagmar (2014). Health-Technology-Assessment Konzepte, Methoden, Praxis für Wissenschaft und Entscheidungsfindung [Health Technology Assessment Concepts, Methods, Practice for Science and Decision Making] (in German). Med. Wiss. Verl.-Ges. ISBN 978-3-941468-71-9.
- Busse, Reinhard (2011). Diagnosis-related Groups in Europe: Moving Towards Transparency, Efficiency and Quality in Hospitals. Vol. 346. McGraw-Hill Education. pp. f3197. doi:10.1136/bmj.f3197. ISBN 978-0-335-24558-1. PMID 23747967. S2CID 78293.
- Schreyögg, J.; Stargardt, T.; Velasco-Garrido, M.; Busse, R. (November 2005). "Defining the 'Health Benefit Basket' in nine European countries". The European Journal of Health Economics. 6 (S1): 2–10. doi:10.1007/s10198-005-0312-3. PMC 1388078. PMID 16270212.
- Busse, Reinhard; Orvain, Jacques; Velasco, Marcial; Perleth, Matthias; Drummond, Michael; Gürtner, Felix; Jørgensen, Torben; Jovell, Albert; Malone, Jim; Rüther, Alric; Wild, Claudia (21 May 2002). "Best practice in undertaking and reporting health technology assessments. Working group 4 report". International Journal of Technology Assessment in Health Care. 18 (2): 361–422. doi:10.1017/S0266462302000284. PMID 12053427. S2CID 21951340.
