= Fernando Simón =

Spanish epidemiologist

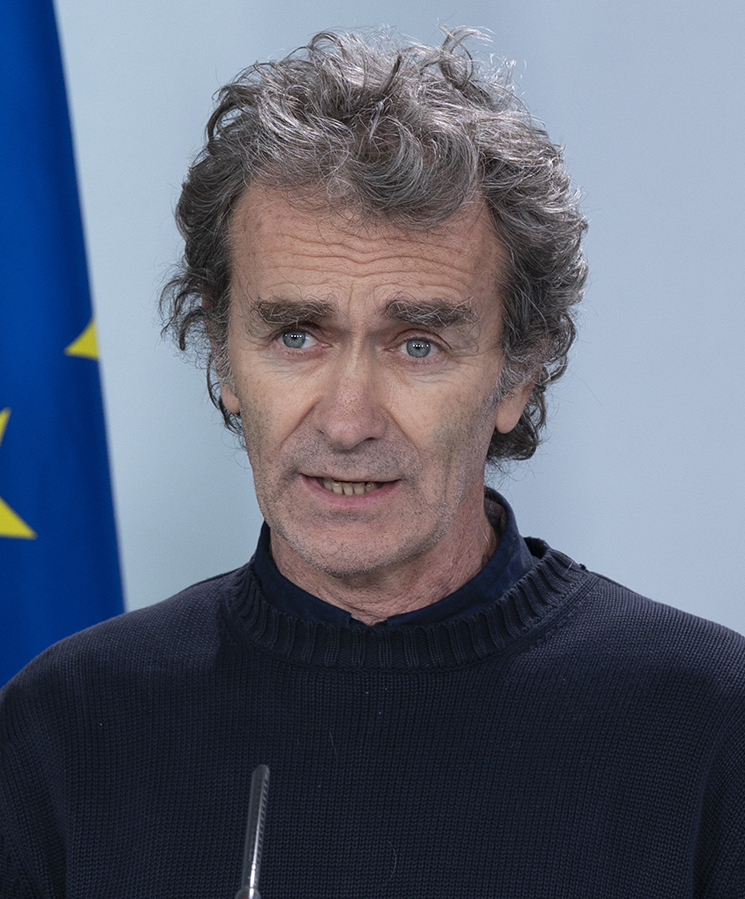
- Fernando Simón Soria in March 2020
- Born: Fernando Simón Soria; 29 July 1963 (age 63); Zaragoza, Spain
- Education: University of Zaragoza; London School of Hygiene & Tropical Medicine

Fernando Simón Soria (born 29 July 1963) is a Spanish epidemiologist serving as Director of the Coordination Centre for Health Alerts and Emergencies of the Ministry of Health. He came to public prominence as spokesman for the special committee on Ebola virus disease in Spain in 2014, and a similar role during the COVID-19 pandemic.

== Early life and education ==
Born in Zaragoza, he graduated in Medicine at the University of Zaragoza, and specialized in Public Health and Epidemiology at the London School of Hygiene & Tropical Medicine. Simón trained in the European Training Program in Intervention Epidemiology at the European Centre for Disease Prevention and Control.

== Career ==
Simón was director of the Center for Research in Tropical Diseases in Manhiça District, in Mozambique, and of the Ntita Hospital in Burundi.

He was also a director of programs in the National Center of Epidemiology (CNE), and a coordinator of the Health Alert and Response Unit in the CNE from 2003 to 2011. He is currently a professor at the National School of Public Health, and a member of the advisory committee of the European Centre for Disease Prevention and Control (ECDC).

In June 2020 he received the Emilio Castelar 2020 award.

Simón tested positive for coronavirus on 30 March 2020. He was temporarily replaced by María José Sierra.
