= Servicio Madrileño de Salud =

Madrilenian Health Service
- Servicio Madrileño de Salud (SERMAS)

Health Care Service overview
- Formed: 2001
- Preceding Health Care Service: Instituto Nacional de la Salud (INSALUD)
- Type: Public Provider
- Jurisdiction: Government of the Community of Madrid
- Parent department: Councillery of Health

The Madrilenian Health Service (Spanish: Servicio Madrileño de Salud, SERMAS) is the body responsible for the system of public health services in the Community of Madrid. The SERMAS was created in 2001, as the functions and services provided by the Instituto Nacional de la Salud (INSALUD) in the region were transferred to it.

SERMAS is responsible for both the management and provision of public health care services in the Madrid region, and also the management and implementation of programs for disease prevention, health promotion and rehabilitation.

== Hospital network ==
The SERMAS network across the region includes the following hospitals: Ramón y Cajal, La Paz, 12 de Octubre, San Carlos, Niño Jesús, Puerta de Hierro, Gómez Ulla, Infanta Leonor, La Princesa, Gregorio Marañón, Santa Cristina, Infanta Sofía, Central de la Cruz Roja, Dr. Rodríguez Lafora, Carlos III, Virgen de la Torre, Henares, Torrejón, Príncipe de Asturias, Fundación Alcorcón, Rey Juan Carlos, Móstoles, Fuenlabrada, Severo Ochoa, Getafe, Infanta Cristina, Infanta Elena, Sureste, Tajo, Virgen de la Poveda, El Escorial, Guadarrama and La Fuenfría.

== See also ==
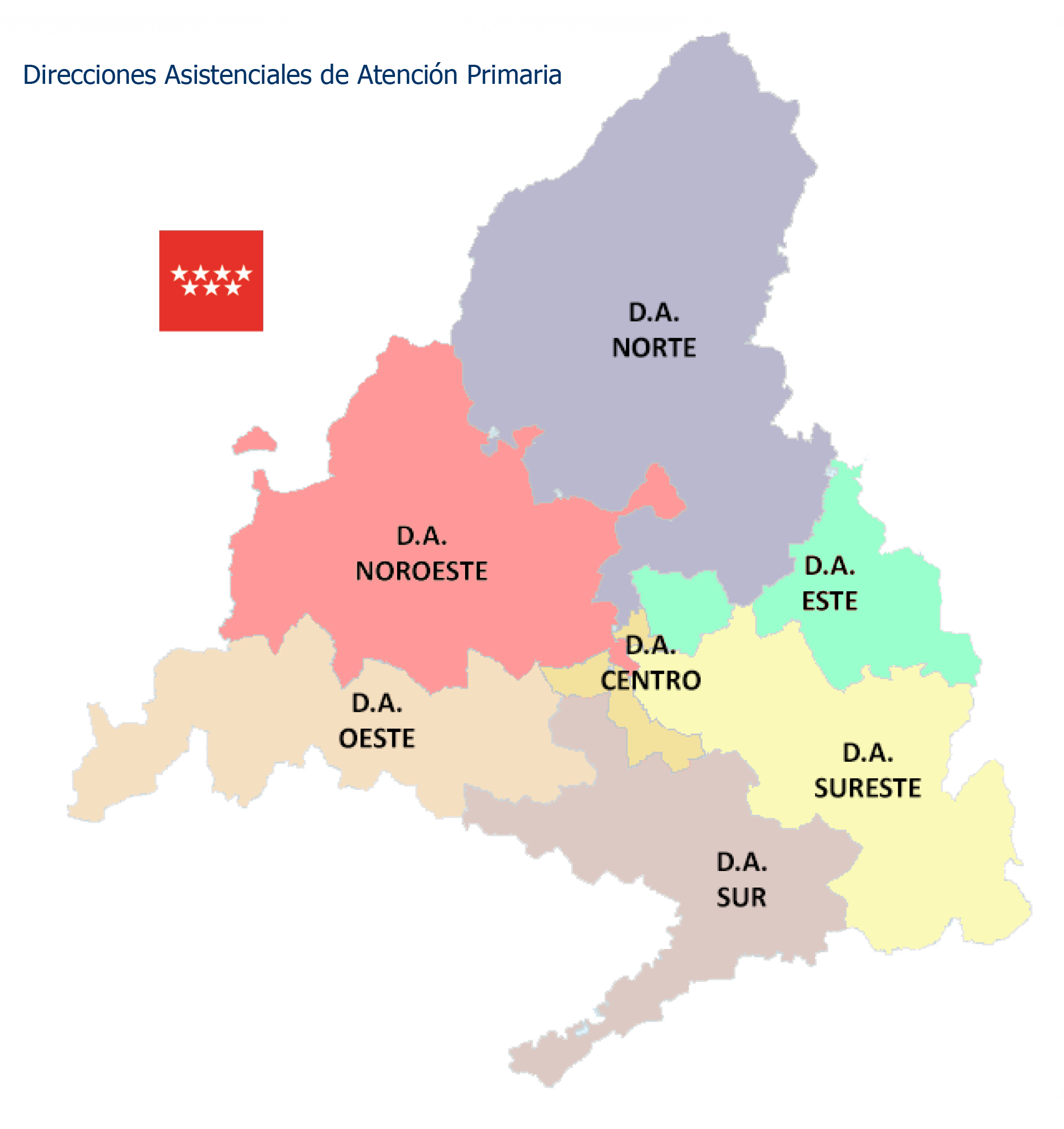
Map of the SERMAS Primary Care Directorates.

- Health care in Spain
- Spanish Ministry of Health
- List of hospitals in Spain
