= Hospital Universitario La Paz =

Hospital in Madrid, Spain

Coordinates: 40.4809°N 3.6874°W

La Paz University Hospital
- Servicio Madrileño de Salud
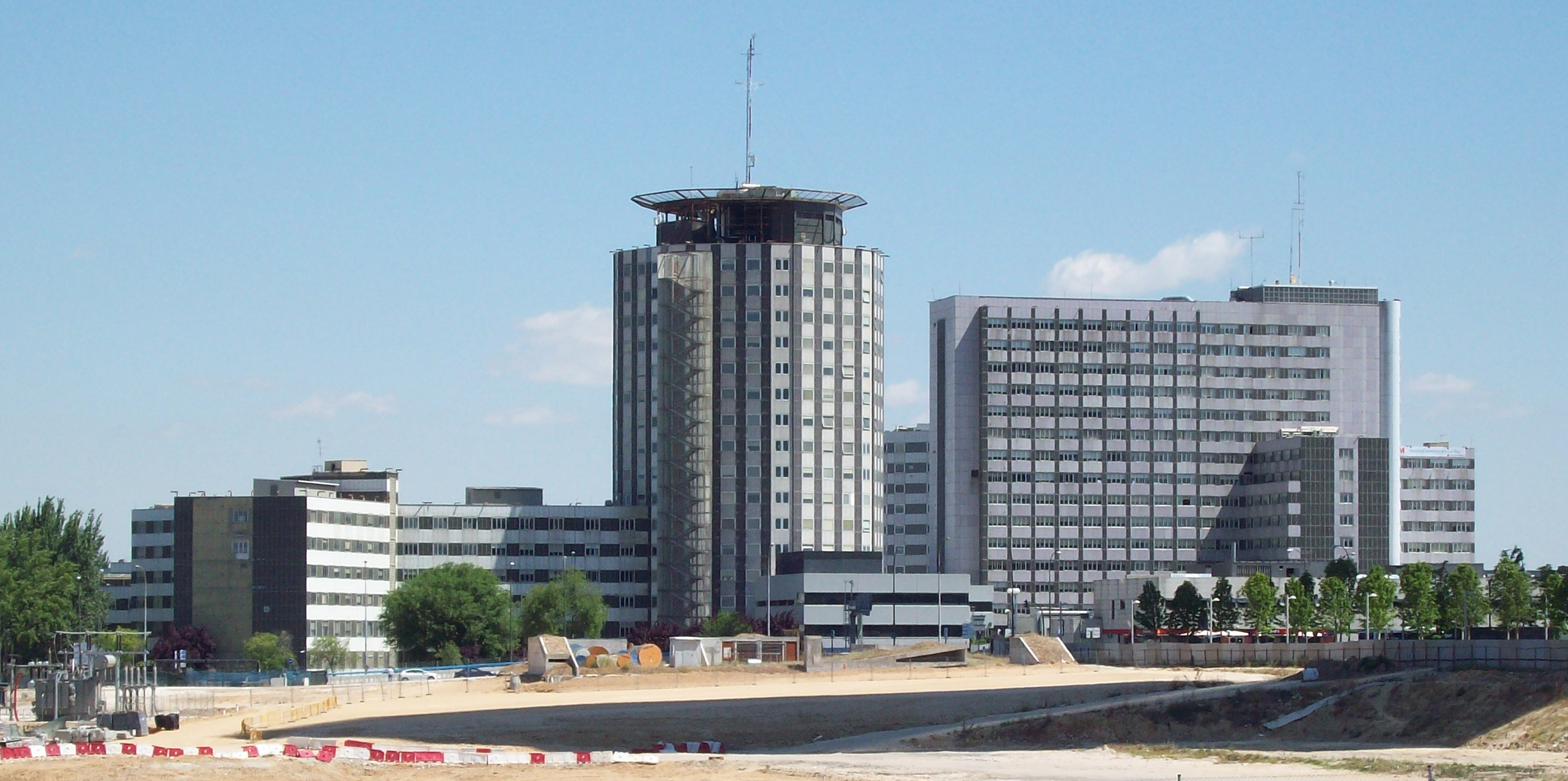
- HULP campus seen from Cuatro Torres Business Area (during its construction)

Geography
- Location: Paseo de la Castellana 261, 28046 Madrid, Madrid Autonomous Region, Spain

Organisation
- Type: Teaching

Services
- Beds: 1,308

History
- Founded: 1964

Links
- Website: www.comunidad.madrid/hospital/lapaz/ www.idipaz.es/DefaultEN.aspx
- Lists: Hospitals in Spain

The Hospital Universitario La Paz (HULP) is a large teaching hospital in Madrid, Spain. It is a general tertiary hospital situated in the La Paz neighbourhood, an area in the north of the Spanish capital that takes its name from the hospital. It is affiliated to the Madrid Regional Health Care System (Servicio Madrileño de Salud-SERMAS) a branch of the Commonwealth of Madrid (the autonomous region's executive administration).

The hospital opened in July 1964, being at that time the first modern hospital centre in the country. It was named to celebrate the 25 years of Francoist peace after the Spanish Civil War. Today, it remains one of the largest hospitals in Madrid by number of in-patients (it serves a population in excess of 500.000 people) and one of the biggest in Spain by number of beds. It was named the best-valued public-owned hospital in 2018. Much of its wards are devoted to Cardiovascular disease, Hematology, General and Digestive Surgery, Neonatology and Organ transplantation. Moreover, the HULP coordinates a European Reference Network for pediatric transplantation, funded by the European Commission.

HULP's headquarters are concentrated in a campus at the northern end of Paseo de la Castellana avenue and comprises 18 buildings that forms three major separate hospitals: General, Children's and Trauma. Administratively, the HULP also includes the smaller Hospital de Cantoblanco and Hospital Carlos III. Hospital Carlos III houses the infectious diseases area and it was prominent in hosting patients of both Ebola, during the 2013-2016 West-Africa Ebola outbreak, and Crimean–Congo hemorrhagic fever.

After the opening (1968) of the Autonomous University of Madrid-UAM's School of Medicine close to the HULP campus, it becomes its clinical reference site. Many of HULP's practitioners also serve as Associate Lecturers at UAM.

== Institute for Health Research ==
As at 2009, and following the efforts of the Spanish government to boost biomedical research, the Hospital La Paz Institute for Health Research (IdiPAZ) was constituted as a joint-venture among the HULP, its own Foundation for research and the neighbouring UAM. The institute has been accredited by the national Instituto de Salud Carlos III, a quality seal in Spain. As at 2019, it host more than 50 research groups in six strategic areas:

- Neurosciences Area
- Cardiovascular Area
- Infectious Diseases and Immunity Area
- Organ System Pathologies Area
- Cancer and Human Molecular Genetics Area
- Surgery, Transplant and Health Technologies Area

Apart from the excellence of its staff and the quality of their core platforms, IdiPAZ strength resides on the synergies with the hospital day-to-day work, the possibility of expedite clinical trials or dig in its vast archives for research data. IdiPAZ's researchers participates in hundreds of research projects funded either by the regional or national agencies, the European Union or several private philanthropic organizations. The institute itself is part of two EU-funded distributed research Infrastructures (ERICs): EATRIS (devoted to translational research) and ECRIN (to clinical trials).

Taken together the IdiPAZ, the UAM's School of Medicine, the Alberto Sols Biomedical Research Institute (affiliated to the CSIC), the Instituto de Salud Carlos III main administrative and research campus (ancient Hospital del Rey: comprising CNIO and CNIC, among other institutes) and even the slightly far away Ramón y Cajal Institute for Health Research (linked to SERMAS' Hospital Universitario Ramón y Cajal) you can find in a couple of square kilometres the biggest biomedical and health research hub of Spain.

== Redevelopment ==
As at 2019 the hospital is scheduled to be rebuilt, although retaining its round tower. A significant proportion of Madrid's population was born in the tower, which houses the hospital's maternity department, and the retention of the structure reflects its place in people's memories. Nevertheless, the tower will be re-purposed to host the administration offices. The rebuilding is intended to be done in the same premises and without closing or displacing the actual activities, constituting an important challenge.
