= Hospital Universitario Infanta Leonor =

Coordinates: 40.38627°N 3.61798°W

Infanta Leonor University Hospital
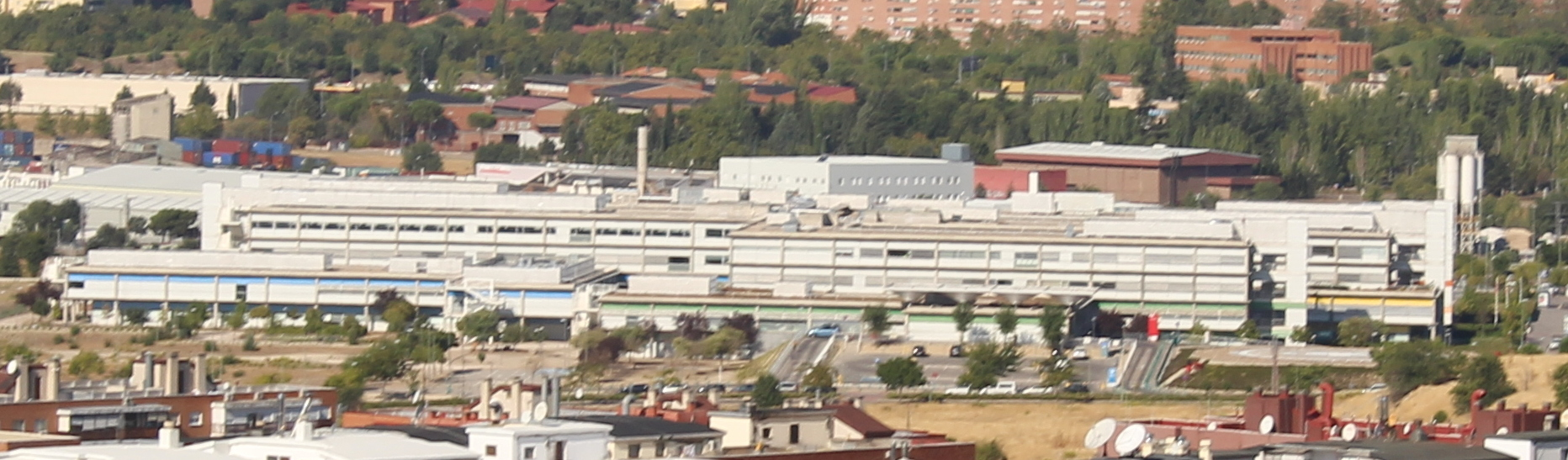

Geography
- Location: Avenida de la Gran Vía del Este 80, 28031, Madrid, Community of Madrid, Spain

Organisation
- Funding: Public hospital
- Type: District General
- Affiliated university: Complutense University of Madrid
- Network: Servicio Madrileño de Salud

Services
- Beds: 264

History
- Opened: 29 February 2008

Links
- Lists: Hospitals in Spain

The Hospital Universitario Infanta Leonor is a district general hospital managed under a public–private partnership model, located in the neighborhood of Santa Eugenia, in the Villa de Vallecas district in Madrid, Spain. It is part of the network of hospitals of the Servicio Madrileño de Salud (SERMAS).

It is one of the healthcare institutions associated with the Complutense University of Madrid (UCM) for the purpose of clinical internship.

== History ==
It was opened on 29 February 2008. Featuring a built surface of 85,000 square metres, it has 264 hospital beds and 11 operating theatres.

It became a centre directly managed by the SERMAS in 2016.

In 2017 the Hospital Virgen de la Torre became part of the organization of the Infanta Leonor from a legal standpoint. In 2019, DIF, a Dutch investment fund, acquired the whole hospital.

Its medical emergency services collapsed in March 2020, during the COVID-19 pandemic, with patients lying on the floor of the hospital corridors.
