= Hospital Universitario del Henares =

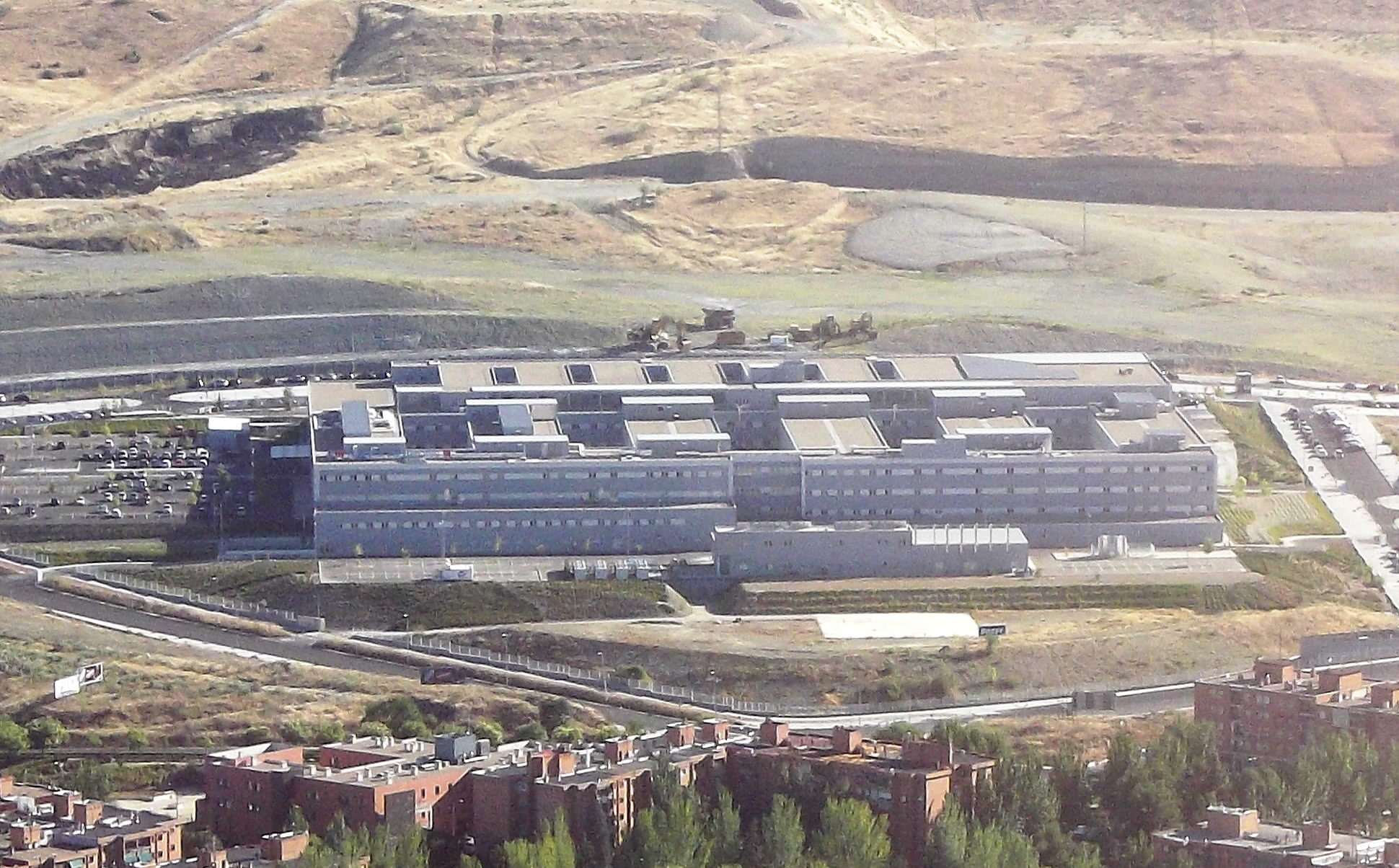

Geography
- Location: Avenida de Marie Curie 2, 28822, Coslada, Community of Madrid, Spain
- Coordinates: 40.4181°N 3.5330°W

Organisation
- Network: Servicio Madrileño de Salud

Services
- Beds: 194

History
- Opened: 11 February 2008

Links
- Lists: Hospitals in Spain

The Hospital Universitario del Henares is a hospital in Coslada, Spain, part of the hospital network of the Servicio Madrileño de Salud (SERMAS). The non-medical services are managed by Sacyr.

== History ==
Featuring 194 beds and 7 operating rooms, with a built surface of 58,149 m^{2} on a plot of 80,000 m^{2}, it was opened on 11 February 2008. It provides medical attention to the municipalities of Coslada, San Fernando de Henares, Mejorada del Campo, Loeches and Velilla de San Antonio.

The regional Health minister of the Community of Madrid Javier Fernández-Lasquetty planned to fully externalise the management of the hospital by 2013 (along other 5 hospitals in the region), yet the process was suspended by the Superior Court of Justice of Madrid.

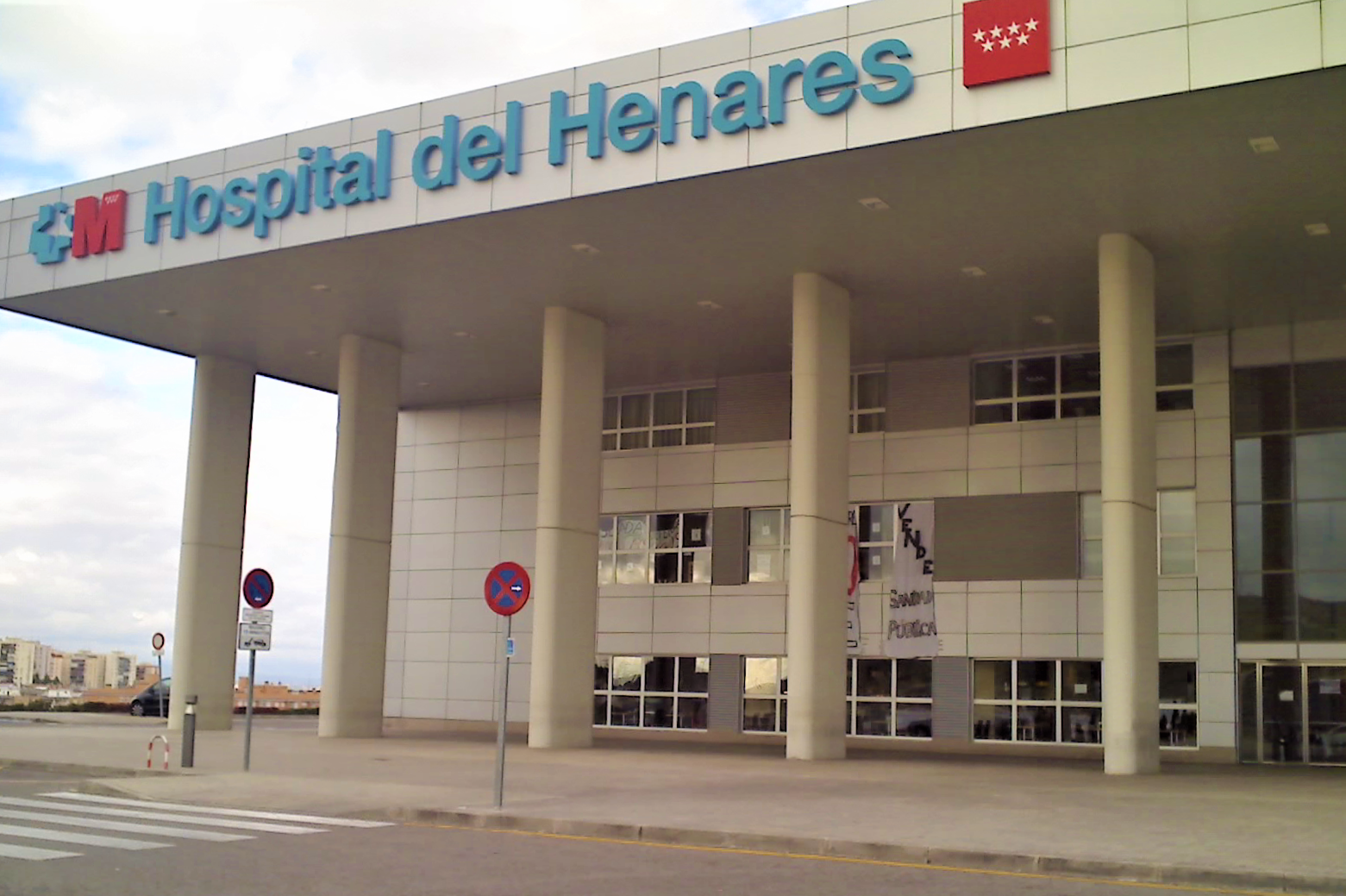

The construction company Sacyr was awarded with the 100% of the services of the hospital (excluding the medical attention) until 2041. Sacyr sold in 2014 nearly the half of its licensees to an investment fund linked to Lloyds Bank.

According to the Audiencia Nacional, the People's Party committed an embezzlement for the value of 258,297 euros when allocating the contracts of the hospital, setting 1% kickbacks.
