= Hospital Universitario de la Princesa =

Coordinates: 40.43397°N 3.67573°W

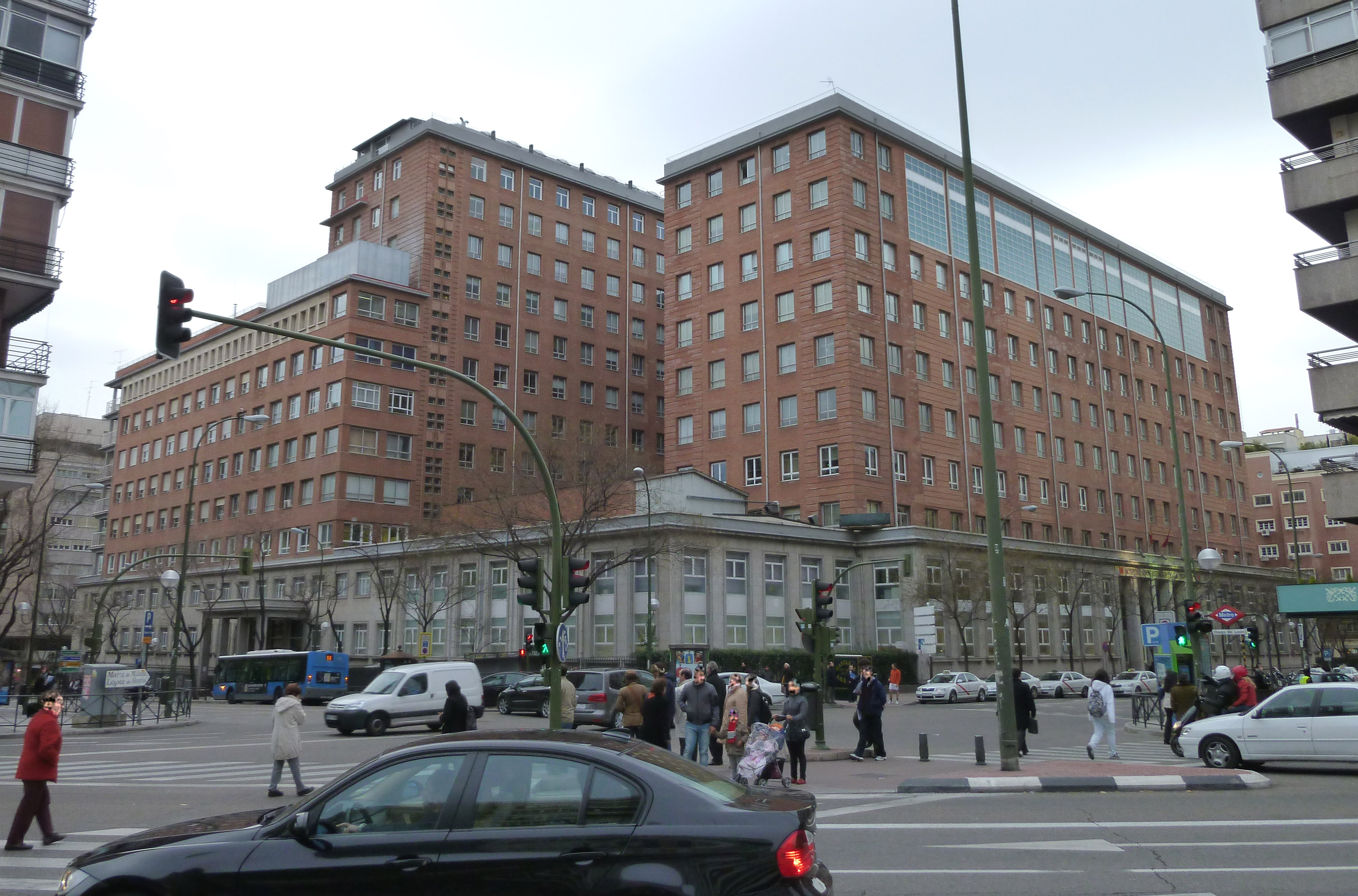

Geography
- Location: Calle de Diego de León, 62, 28006, Madrid, Community of Madrid, Spain

Organisation
- Funding: Public hospital
- Type: Teaching, District General
- Affiliated university: Autonomous University of Madrid
- Network: Servicio Madrileño de Salud

Services
- Beds: 564

History
- Opened: 3 November 1955

Links
- Lists: Hospitals in Spain

The Hospital Universitario de la Princesa is a hospital located in the Lista neighborhood in Madrid, Spain, part of the hospital network of the Servicio Madrileño de Salud (SERMAS).

It is one of the healthcare institutions associated to the Autonomous University of Madrid (UAM) for the purpose of clinical internship.

== History ==
Lying on the block delimited by the streets of Diego de León, Conde de Peñalver, Maldonado and General Díaz Porlier, it was a project of Manuel Martínez Chumillas, who had been involved with the GATEPAC group during the Second Republic. Intending to replace the old Hospital de la Princesa built in the Paseo de Areneros (calle de Alberto Aguilera), it was inaugurated on 3 November 1955 under the name of Gran Hospital de la Beneficencia General del Estado. The building works lasted however until 1956. The hospital forms a 14-floor building complex. Starting from 100 at the time of its opening, the effective bed usage steadily grew, reaching 761 beds in 1959.

It was transferred from the State Administration to the regional administration of the Community of Madrid in 1985. It was finally renamed as Hospital Universitario de la Princesa in 1994. As of 2020 it has a capacity of 564 beds.
