= Hospital del Niño Jesús =

Hospital Infantil Universitario del Niño Jesús
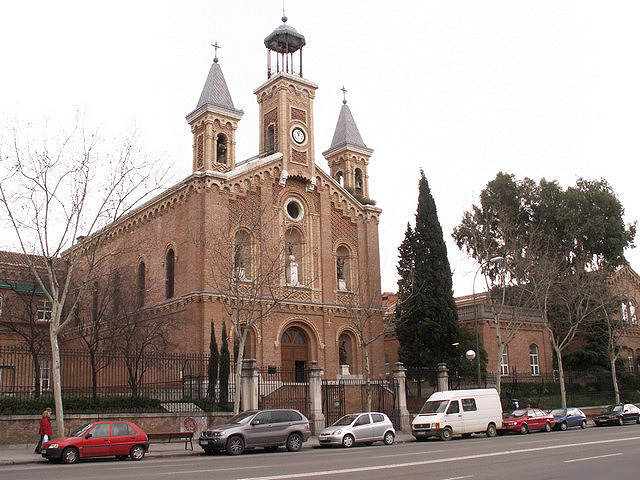

Geography
- Location: Avenida de Menéndez Pelayo 65, 28009, Madrid, Community of Madrid, Spain

Organisation
- Type: children's hospital
- Network: Servicio Madrileño de Salud

Services
- Beds: 160

Links
- Lists: Hospitals in Spain

The Hospital Infantil Universitario Niño Jesús is a children's hospital located at the Niño Jesús neighborhood in Madrid, Spain, part of the hospital network of the Servicio Madrileño de Salud (SERMAS). The building was declared Bien de Interés Cultural in 1995.

== History ==
The building project was drafted by Francisco Jareño. Works lasted from 1879 to circa 1885, although the building was reportedly inaugurated in 1881.

As of 2019 it has 160 beds.

It is associated to the Autonomous University of Madrid (UAM) for the purpose of medical internship and to the Alfonso X El Sabio University, the Universidad Pontificia Comillas, the Escuela Universitaria de Enfermería y Fisioterapia San Juan de Dios, the Universidad Pontificia de Salamanca the Facultad de Enfermería y Fisioterapia Salus Infirmorum and the Centro Universitario San Rafael-Nebrija for the purpose of nursery internship.
