= Coordination Centre for Health Alerts and Emergencies =

Body of the Spanish Ministry of Health

- Centro de Coordinación de Alertas y Emergencias Sanitarias
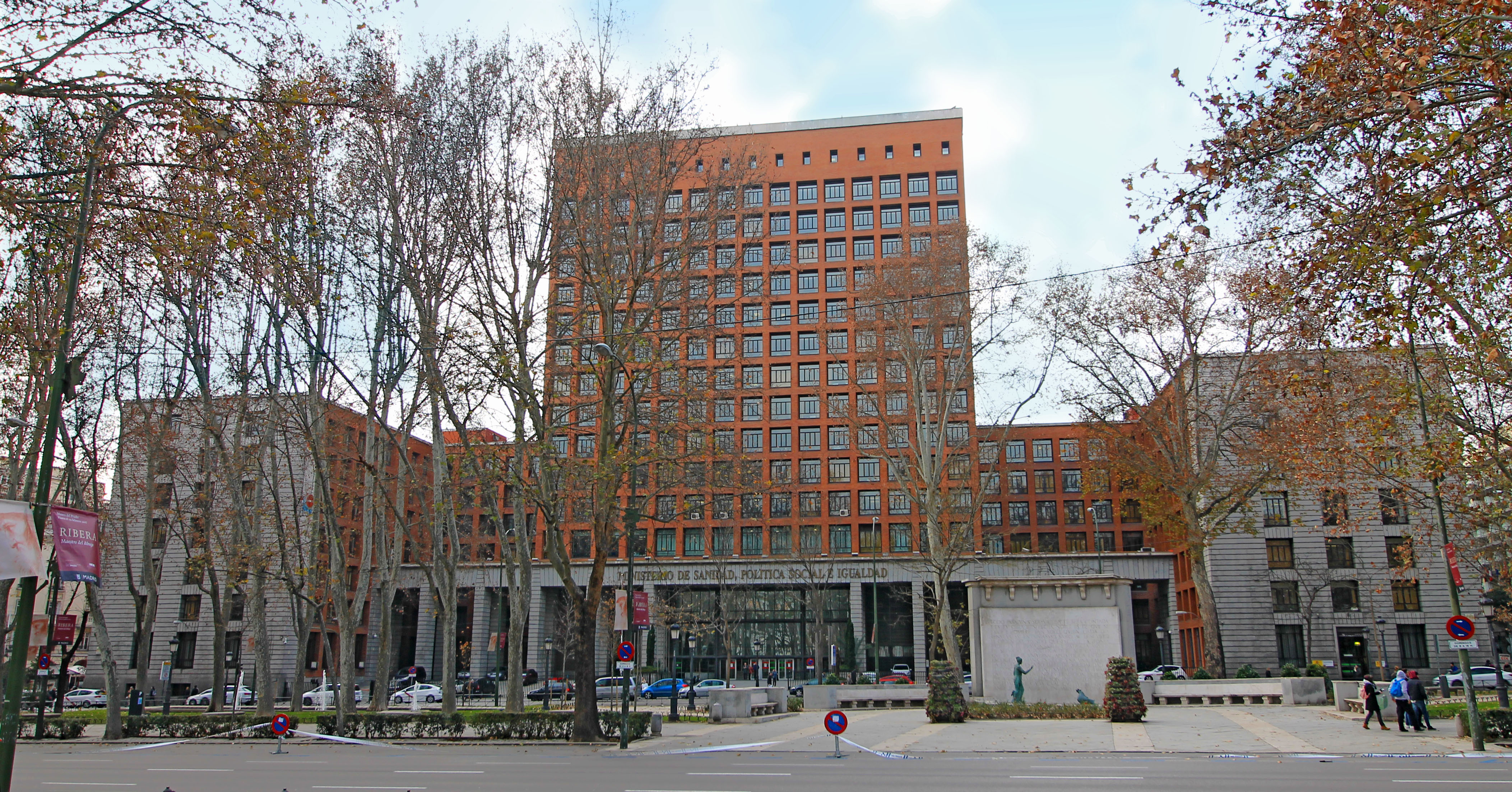
- Headquarters of the Ministry of Health

Agency overview
- Formed: 6 March 2004; 22 years ago
- Type: Deputy Directorate-General
- Jurisdiction: Spanish government
- Headquarters: Casa Sindical Building; Madrid, Spain
- Minister responsible: Mónica García, Health Minister
- Agency executives: Fernando Simón, Director; María José Sierra, Deputy Director
- Website: CCAES (in Spanish)

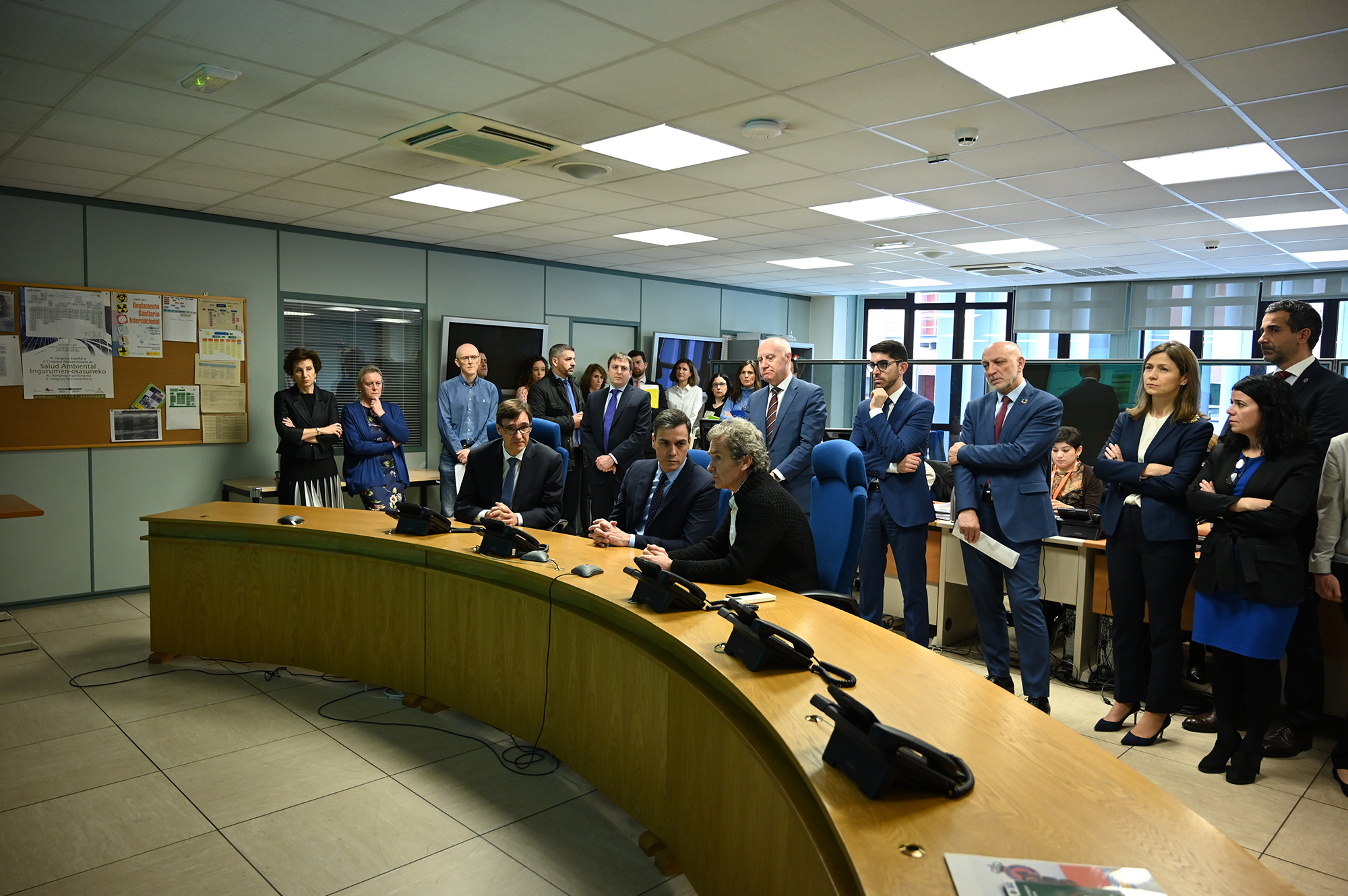
Prime Minister Pedro Sánchez, along with the Health Minister, Salvador Illa, and the Director of the Centre, Fernando Simón in 2020.

The Coordination Centre for Health Alerts and Emergencies (Spanish: Centro de Coordinación de Alertas y Emergencias Sanitarias, CCAES) is a body of the Spanish Ministry of Health responsible for coordinating the management of information and supporting all health authorities in cases of national or international health alert or emergency situations that pose a threat to the health of the population. This centre is also the unit responsible in Spain for preparing and developing response plans to deal with public health threats.

The CCAES was created in 2004, under minister Ana Pastor Julián. It is integrated in the Directorate-General for Public Health of the Ministry of Health and the centre is part of the Spanish Coordination System for Alerts and Emergencies in Health and Consumer Affairs. It is led by a Director, currently Fernando Simón since 2012.

== Responsibilities ==
The responsibilities of the CCASE are regulated in two legal instruments, the founding ministerial order of the centre and the current Royal Decree that establishes the Ministry's structure.

According to the Order of the Minister of Health of 27 February 2004, the centre has five main responsibilities:

- To continuously and permanently monitor elements of risk and potential negative impact on public health, collaborating with the units responsible for sector surveillance, and coordinating, where appropriate, the receipt and registration of notifications and alerts in accordance with protocols and procedures established, integrating information from different internal and external sources.
- To develop risk situation analysis and provide health administrations and other organizations with access to qualified information quickly.
- To coordinate the preparation of the Ministry's response plans in crisis and emergency situations, as well as to provide support and coordinate the development of a Ministry contingency plan for crisis and emergency situations.
- To support the Department units with competences in matters related to crisis management.
- To serve as a source of information and rapid alert to the Minister of Health in matters related to bioterrorism and other public health emergencies, and support the control, operations and decision functions of the Steering Committee for Crisis and Emergency Situations (CODISCE), and guarantee permanent communication with the bodies of the General State Administration, the Autonomous Communities or the European Commission, where appropriate, for crisis management, ensuring full operation 24 hours a day, every day of the year.

According to the Royal Decree 454/2020, which develops the basic organic structure of the Ministry of Health, the centre's duties are also:

- To exercise the actions related to international health as established in article 39 of the General Public Health Act of 2011.
- To prepare, in collaboration with other public agencies involved, plans for preparedness and response to current or emerging threats to human health.
