= Health Policy (journal) =

- Discipline: Health policy, health care
- Language: English
- Edited by: Reinhard Busse

Publication details
- Former name(s): Health Policy and Education
- History: 1979–present
- Publisher: Elsevier
- Frequency: Monthly
- Impact factor: 2.293 (2017)

Standard abbreviations
- ISO 4: Health Policy

Indexing
- ISSN: 0168-8510 (print); 1872-6054 (web)
- OCLC no.: 10960514

Links
- Journal homepage; Online access; Online archive

Health Policy is a monthly peer-reviewed academic journal covering health policy and health care. It was established in 1979 as Health Policy and Education, obtaining its current name in 1984. It is published by Elsevier and the editor-in-chief is Reinhard Busse (Technische Universität Berlin). According to the Journal Citation Reports, the journal has a 2017 impact factor of 2.293.
