= Ebola virus disease in Spain =

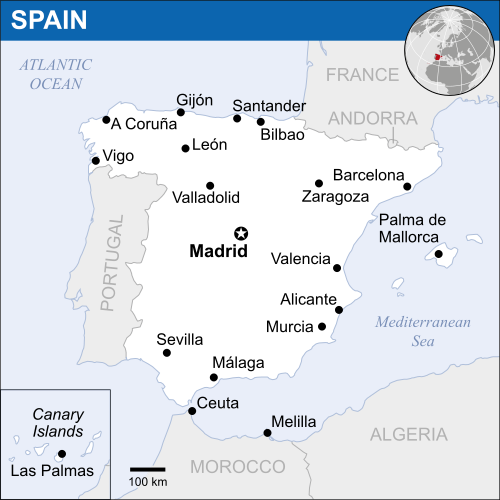
- Map of Spain
- Disease: Ebolavirus
- Index case: 6 October 2014
- Confirmed cases: 1

In 2014, Ebola virus disease in Spain occurred due to two patients with cases of the disease contracted during the Ebola virus epidemic in West Africa; they were medically evacuated. A failure in infection control in the treatment of the second patient led to an isolated infection of Ebola virus disease in a health worker in Spain itself. The health worker survived her Ebola infection, and has since been declared infection-free.

== Initial medevac cases ==
On 5 August 2014, the Brothers Hospitallers of St. John of God confirmed that Brother Miguel Pajares, who had been volunteering in Liberia, had become infected. He was evacuated to Spain on 6 August 2014, and subsequently died on 12 August. On 21 September it was announced that Brother Manuel García Viejo, another Spanish citizen who was medical director at the St John of God Hospital Sierra Leone in Lunsar, had been evacuated to Spain from Sierra Leone after being infected with the virus. His death was announced on 25 September. Both of these cases were treated at the Hospital Carlos III in Madrid.

=== Medical personnel infection ===
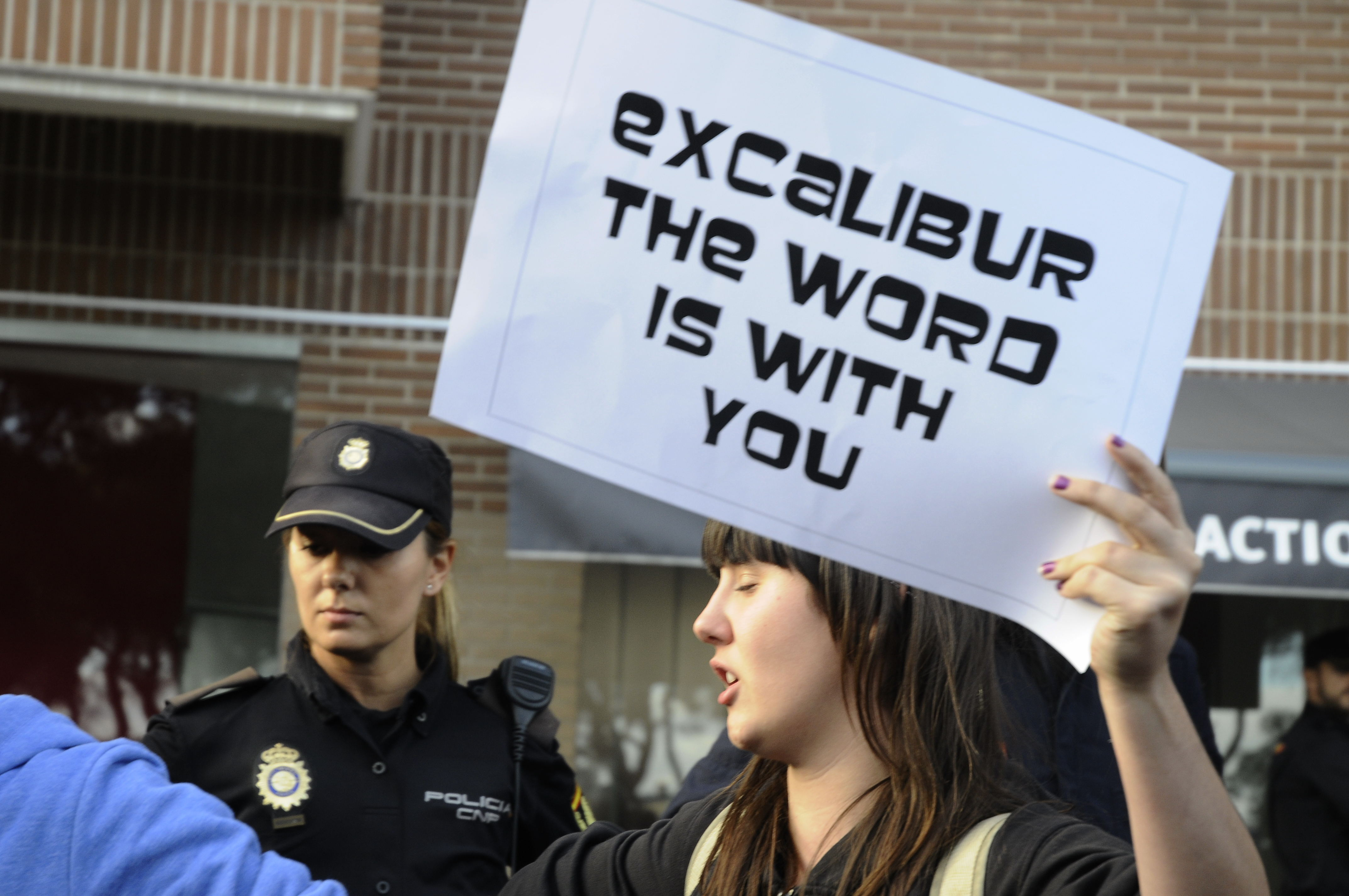
Protest against euthanasia of Romero Ramos' pet dog

In October 2014, María Teresa Romero Ramos, an auxiliary nurse who had cared for Manuel García Viejo at the Hospital Carlos III had become unwell and on 6 October tested positive for Ebola at her local hospital in Alcorcón, the Hospital Universitario Fundación Alcorcón. A second test confirmed the diagnosis, making this the first confirmed case of Ebola transmission outside Africa. Following testing, she was transferred to the Hospital Carlos III in Madrid for treatment.

As of October 7, 50 contacts were being monitored, with 7 kept in isolation at the Hospital Carlos III, and an investigation was under way.

On 7 October, Madrid's regional government got a court order to euthanize Romero's pet dog, Excalibur, concerned that it posed a risk as a reservoir host. By the afternoon there were over 30 animal rights activists who had barricaded the apartment to prevent officials from removing the dog. A number of online petitions were started rallying to save the dog, garnering hundreds of thousands of indications of support. Ramos' quarantined husband, Javier, called on a veterinarian radio show host, and recorded a video appeal, for help to save his dog. On 8 October, Spanish authorities removed, sedated and euthanized the dog and arranged for the safe disposal of its remains.

On 9 October the Spanish health ministry quarantined three more people. The health authorities announced that María Teresa Romero Ramos' condition had worsened significantly. On October 12, she began to show some improvement. According to one report, the improvement may be attributed to Romero's having received the experimental drug ZMab which is similar to ZMapp, which has been used to treat several Ebola patients. However, according to information released by Spain's Centre for Health and Emergency Alerts, the nurse did not receive ZMab due to concerns over possible side-effects. Romero, however, was given the experimental antiviral drug Favipiravir, and it was reported that the dosages used were much higher than those used in the treatment of other patients.Medical staff in Madrid protested about the lack of effective protective equipment and safety precautions. It was reported on October 17 that all the other people suspected of being infected in Spain had tested negative for the Ebola virus.

On October 20 it was announced that Teresa Romero had tested negative for the Ebola virus, suggesting she may have cleared the virus from her system. On November 1, it was announced that she was Ebola-free, and had been moved out of the isolation ward into a normal hospital bed to finish the process of recuperation from her illness. The WHO declared Spain Ebola-free on 2 December, 42 days after Teresa Romero was shown to be free of Ebola on 21 October.

== 2018 prototype vaccine ==
In July 2018, a Spanish team from the October 12 Hospital in Madrid announced the discovery of an antibody and the development of a prototype vaccine against five strains of Ebola, including the most common and deadliest.

== Legacy in the 2020 coronavirus pandemic ==
The Ebola cases in Spain occurred when the country was governed by the People's Party, under prime minister Mariano Rajoy. The opposition Spanish Socialist Workers' Party (PSOE) used its official Twitter account to directly blame Rajoy for the outbreak, and party leader Pedro Sánchez called the government a "disgovernment" while calling for the dismissal of Health Minister Ana Mato. Pablo Iglesias, leader of the left-wing party Podemos also blamed the government for the outbreak. These comments received scrutiny during the COVID-19 pandemic in Spain in which tens of thousands of people were infected and thousands died, while Sánchez was prime minister and Iglesias deputy prime minister.
