= María José Sierra =

Spanish doctor (born 1968)

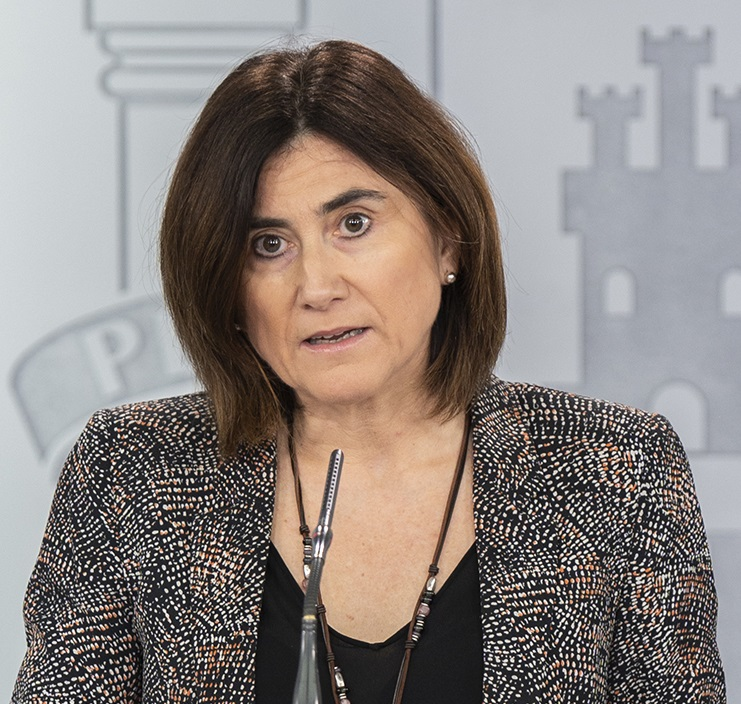
- María José Sierra in April 2020
- Born: 1968 (age 57–58); Zaragoza, Spain
- Education: University of Zaragoza; Autonomous University of Madrid
- Known for: Her role as temporarily spokesperson for the Ministry of Health during the first wave of the COVID-19 pandemic in Spain
- Scientific career
- Fields: Public health and epidemiology
- Workplaces: Coordination Centre for Health Alerts and Emergencies

María José Sierra Moros (born 1968) is a Spanish doctor specialising in preventive medicine, public health and epidemiology. She is the deputy director of the Coordination Centre for Health Alerts and Emergencies of the Spanish Ministry of Health since 2024.

In late March 2020, following Fernando Simón's positive COVID-19 test result, she took over as technical spokesperson for the Ministry of Health during the first wave of the COVID-19 pandemic in Spain.

== Early life and education ==
Sierra was born in 1968 in Zaragoza, Aragon, Spain. She studied medicine at the University of Zaragoza and after passing the professional examination, she moved to Madrid.

She obtained her PhD from the Autonomous University of Madrid in 2000 with a thesis entitled Homocysteine, folate, vitamin B6 and B12 as risk factors in cerebrovascular disease: a case-control study.

== Career ==
She is a career civil servant in the National Health Service Medical Corps, and in 2001 Sierra was appointed head of section in the Directorate-General for Public Health and Consumer Affairs within the Deputy Directorate-General for Health Promotion and Epidemiology.

She is an expert in epidemics and contagious diseases, having published works on the 2015–16 Zika virus epidemic in America, the circulation of the West Nile virus in Spain, dengue fever, the epidemiological situation of Leishmania infantum and Influenza A virus.

In 2016, after the first two cases of Crimean-Congo haemorrhagic fever were detected in Spain and Western Europe, Sierra was appointed to the committee of experts set up by the Ministry of Health. She is also part of the Spanish Network of Microbiology Laboratories.

In late March 2020, following Fernando Simón's positive COVID-19 test result, which Sierra herself informed, she took over as technical spokesperson for the Ministry of Health during the first wave of the COVID-19 pandemic in Spain. She did so as Head of Area of the Coordination Centre for Health Alerts and Emergencies. That day, she reported 85,195 infected and 7,340 deaths, and a change in trend after two weeks of strict lockdown. Her appearances on Spanish television at press conference were regular during the pandemic.

Sierra was appointed deputy director of the Coordination Centre for Health Alerts and Emergencies in November 2024.
