= Hospital General Universitario Gregorio Marañón =

Coordinates: 40.41948°N 3.67124°W

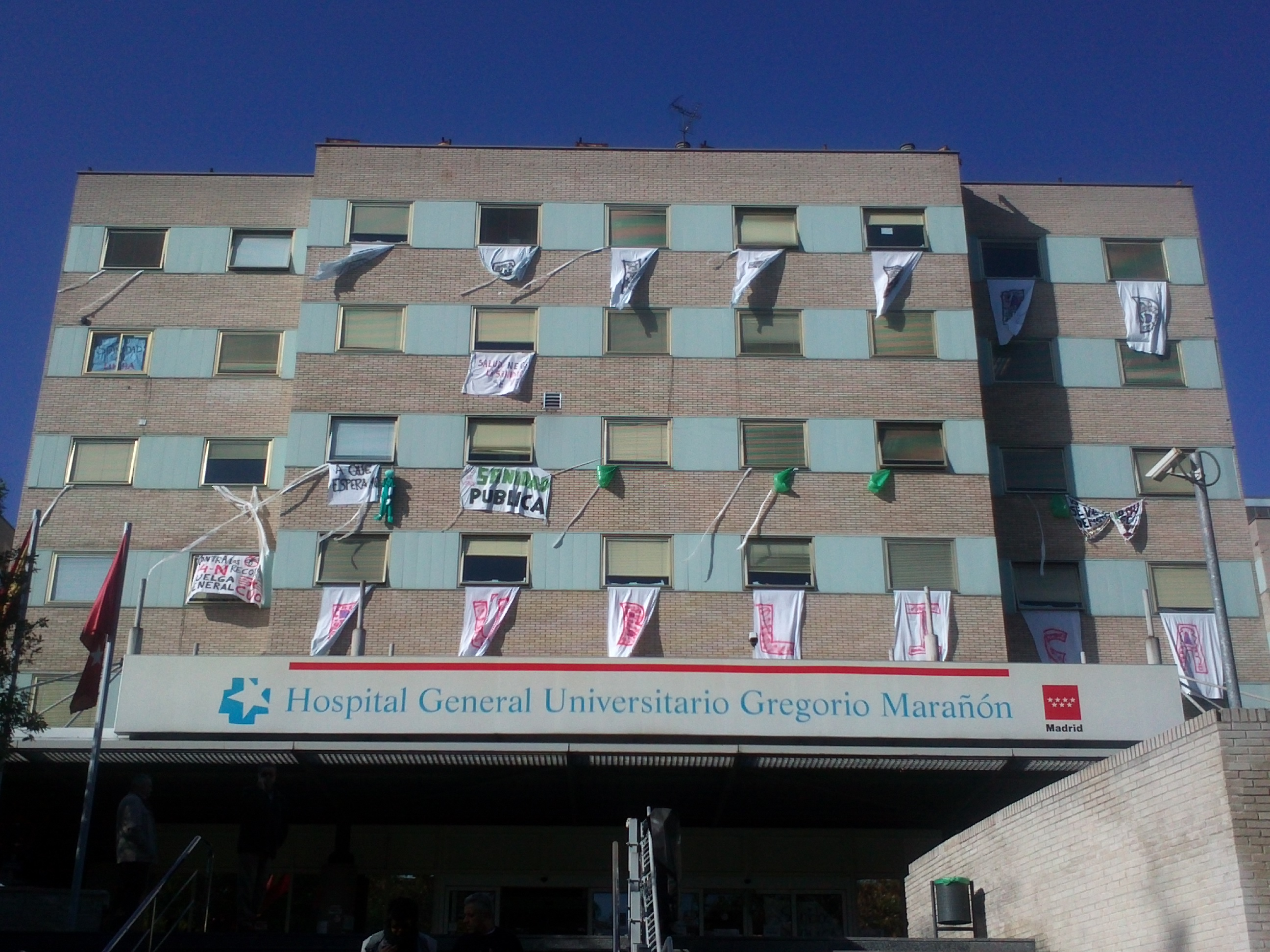

Geography
- Location: Calle del Doctor Esquerdo 46, 28007, Madrid, Community of Madrid, Spain

Organisation
- Funding: Public hospital
- Type: Teaching
- Affiliated university: Complutense University of Madrid
- Network: Servicio Madrileño de Salud

Services
- Beds: 1,671

History
- Opened: 18 July 1968

Links
- Lists: Hospitals in Spain

The Hospital General Universitario Gregorio Marañón is a public general hospital located at the neighborhood of Ibiza in Madrid, Spain, part of the hospital network of the Servicio Madrileño de Salud (SERMAS).

It is one of the healthcare institutions associated to the Complutense University of Madrid (UCM) for the purpose of clinical internship.

== History ==
A project of Martín José Marcide, it was built on the landplot delimited by the streets of Doctor Esquerdo, Doctor Castelo, Ibiza and Máiquez formerly occupied by the Hospital de San Juan de Dios. It was an enterprise of the provincial diputación; the Provincial Hospital of Madrid/General Hospital of Madrid (an institution with more than four centuries of history) moved to the new facilities. It was inaugurated by Francisco Franco on 18 July 1968 under the name Ciudad Sanitaria Provincial Francisco Franco. Years after the death of the dictator it was renamed, making a reference to Gregorio Marañón, renowned physician. The hospital complex comprises more than 20 buildings.

It is a reference center in the fields of cardiology and oncology. It particularly stands out at heart transplantation in children. As of 2017, it has 1,671 beds and 45 operating rooms.

== Bibliography ==
- Pieltáin Álvarez-Arenas, Alberto (2003). Los hospitales de Franco: la versión autóctona de una arquitectura moderna (PDF). Madrid: Universidad Politécnica de Madrid.

== See also ==
- List of hospitals in Spain
