= Hospital Carlos III =

Coordinates: 40.4752°N 3.6957°W

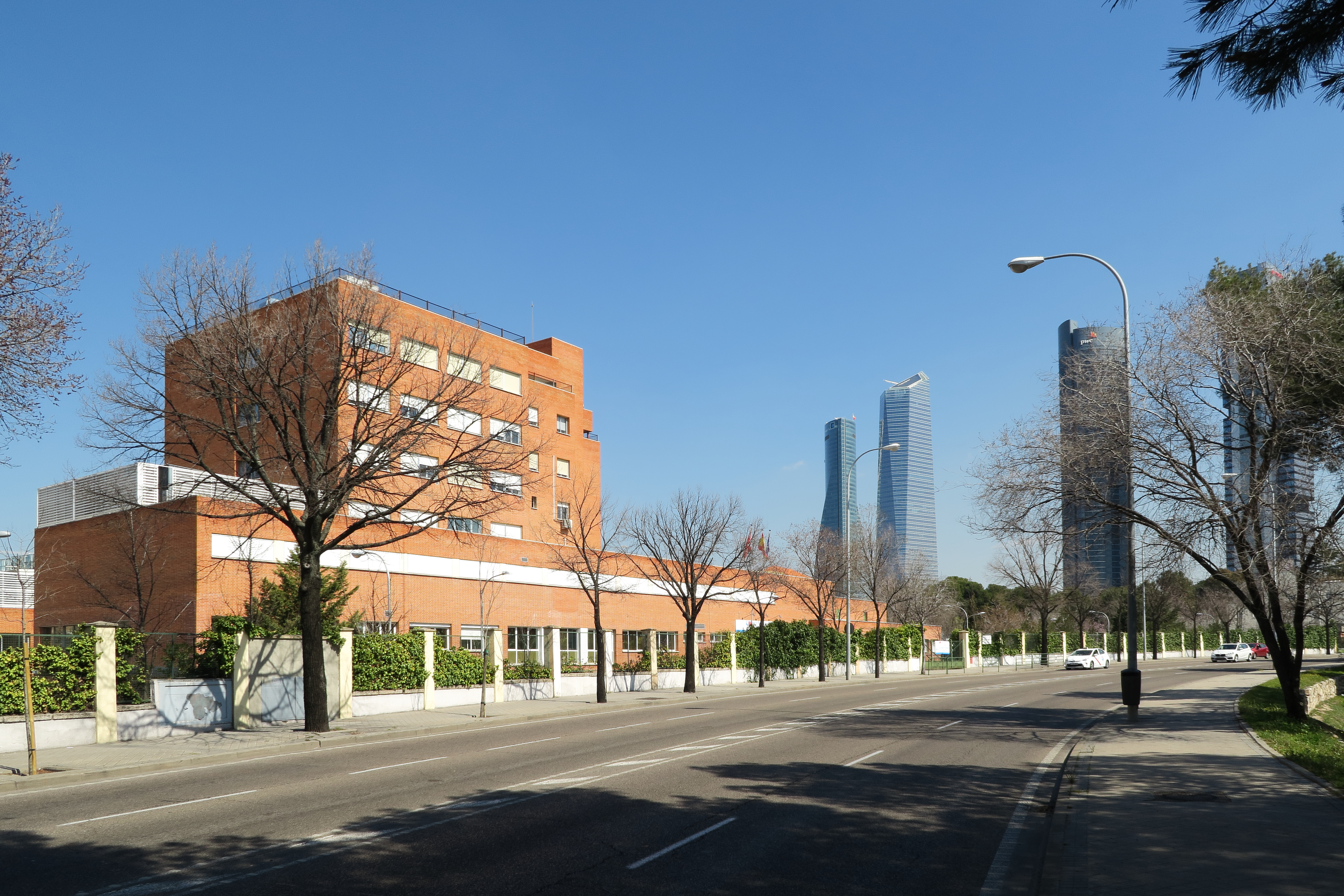
- Hospital Carlos III

Geography
- Location: Madrid, Spain

Organisation
- Care system: Public
- Type: District General
- Affiliated university: Servicio Madrileño de Salud

History
- Founded: 1990

Links
- Lists: Hospitals in Spain

The Hospital Carlos III is a public hospital in the city of Madrid. It belongs to the Servicio Madrileño de Salud, the health service of the Community of Madrid. It was crested in 1990 from the merger of three previous hospitals, and was established as a center of excellence in research and treatment of infectious diseases.

A 2013 restructuring led to the closure of some of its rooms and services related to infectious diseases and gave it the role of medium-stay hospital attached to the Hospital Universitario La Paz for referring patients to public hospitals in the Community of Madrid. The need to admit a number of patients affected by Ebola virus disease in 2014 led to the reopening of the infectious disease treatment area.

== Ebola virus disease cases ==
On 5 August 2014, the Brothers Hospitallers of St. John of God confirmed that Brother Miguel Pajares, who had been volunteering in Liberia, had become infected. He was evacuated to Spain on 6 August 2014, and subsequently died on 12 August. On 21 September it was announced that Brother Manuel García Viejo, another Spanish citizen who was medical director at the St John of God Hospital Sierra Leone in Lunsar, had been evacuated to Spain from Sierra Leone after being infected with the virus. His death was announced on 25 September. Both of these cases were treated at the Hospital Carlos III.

On October 6, 2014, Maria Teresa Romero Ramos a nursing assistant who worked at the Hospital Carlos III helping with the care of Manuel García Viejo, arrived at her local hospital, the Hospital Universitario Fundación Alcorcón in Alcorcón, where she was diagnosed with Ebola virus disease. After diagnosis, she was later transferred back to the Hospital Carlos III for treatment.
