= National School of Public Health (Spain) =

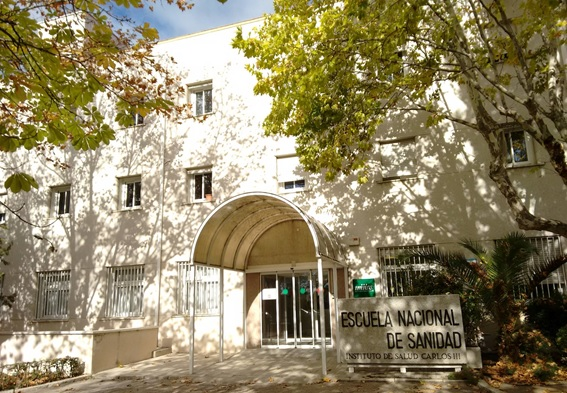
National School of Public Health

The National School of Public Health of Spain (Escuela Nacional de Sanidad, or ENS, in Spanish) is a public research institution in Madrid in the field of Public Health and Health administration. Founded in 1924 with the support of the League of Nations and the Rockefeller institution, the National School of Public Health is the oldest organization in Spain serving in the field of Public Health research and education. Nowadays, it is part of the Carlos III Health Institute.
