= Hospital Universitario Fundación Alcorcón =

Hospital in Alcorcón, Spain

- Spanish National Health System
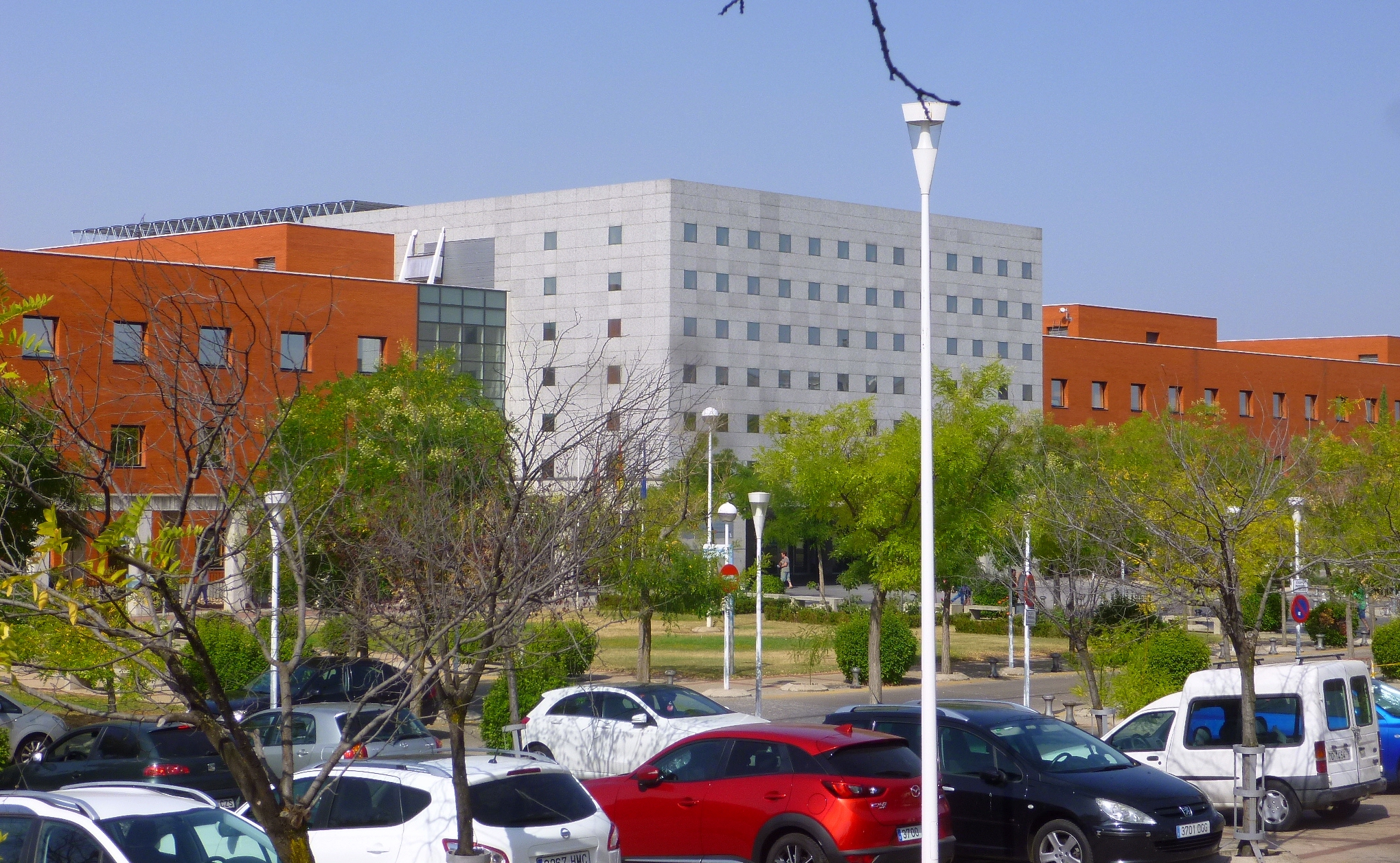

Geography
- Location: Alcorcón, Community of Madrid, Spain
- Coordinates: 40.3488°N 3.8367°W

Organisation
- Care system: Public
- Type: Teaching
- Affiliated university: European University of Madrid

Services
- Beds: 500

History
- Founded: 1997

Links
- Website: www.comunidad.madrid/hospital/fundacionalcorcon/

The Hospital Universitario Fundación Alcorcón (HUFA) is a major general hospital in Alcorcón, a city in the Madrid metropolitan area of Spain. It was founded in 1997.

Although the hospital was built by the Spanish National Health System, its management model is a foundation, similar to a public company, so its operating rules differ, in some aspects, from those of other public hospitals. The hospital was allowed to negotiate its own contracts with workers. The governance of the hospital includes regional and local governments and university partners.

The hospital's organizational structure is thought to have been one of the inspirations behind the creation of the United Kingdom's system of NHS Foundation Trusts.

In October 2014, the hospital was reported to be treating a case of Ebola virus disease under strict biosecurity precautions. The patient had arrived at the hospital by ambulance on October 6. After diagnosis, she was later transferred to the Hospital Carlos III in Madrid for treatment.
