= Cave of the Guanches =

Cave and archaeological site on the Canary Islands

Coordinates: 28.3769°N 16.7231°W

- location in Spain
- Associated with: Guanches
- Location: in the north of Tenerife, (Canary Islands
- Region: Spain

The Cave of the Guanches, or Archaeological area of the Cave of the Guanches (Spanish: Zona Arqueológica de la Cueva de los Guanches), is an important archaeological site located in the north of the island of Tenerife (Canary Islands, Spain).

== Characteristics ==
The protected archaeological environment is in the municipality of Icod de los Vinos and revolves around the Cave of the Guanches. This archaeological area is where the earliest Guanche autochthonous settlements on the island of Tenerife have been found. It has provided the oldest chronologies of the Canary Islands. These have been dated to the 6th century BCE, according to analysis carried out on ceramics that were found inside.

The area was in aboriginal times a village of natural caves and huts (now disappeared), which were located at the top of a cliff, about 125 m (410 ft) above sea level. The site is also famous for having found in him a single secondary burial pit. This is considered an exceptional find in the Canary Islands two questions: firstly due to the rare circumstance of a secondary burial and secondly, by their nature individual burial. The oral tradition also points out that the place was the abode of the menceyes of Icod (aboriginal Guanche kings).

At the site have been found numerous findings, including: pottery shards made by hand, bone awls, bone remains of caprids, shells of marine mollusks and a human lower jaw. Most of these archeological finds can be found in the Museo Guanche in Icod de los Vinos. A small representative sample of artefacts is also in the British Museum.

The cave is declared a Site of Cultural Interest by the Government of the Canary Islands.

== See also ==
- Cave of Achbinico
- Cave of Chinguaro
- Caves of Don Gaspar
