= Parque del Drago =

Drago Park
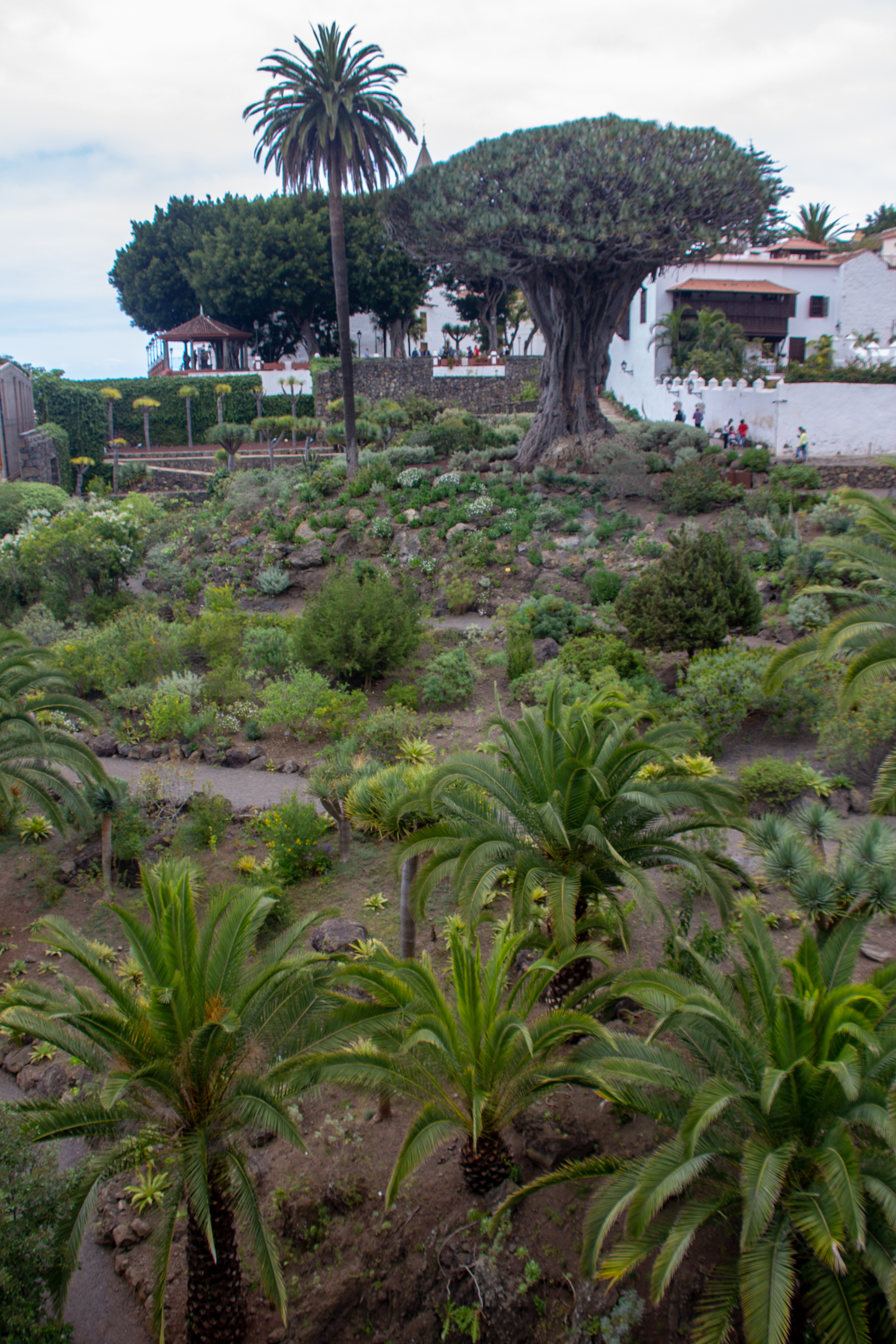
- Interactive map of Drago Park
- Location: Icod de los Vinos, Tenerife, Spain
- Coordinates: 28°21′58″N 16°43′20″W
- Created: 1997–2000

Drago Park (Spanish: Parque del Drago) is a park and one of the main visitor attractions in Icod de los Vinos, Tenerife. Created at the turn of the millennium, it contains El Drago Milenario, a dragon tree thought to be around 1,000 years old, as well as a variety of other native plants.

== Contents ==
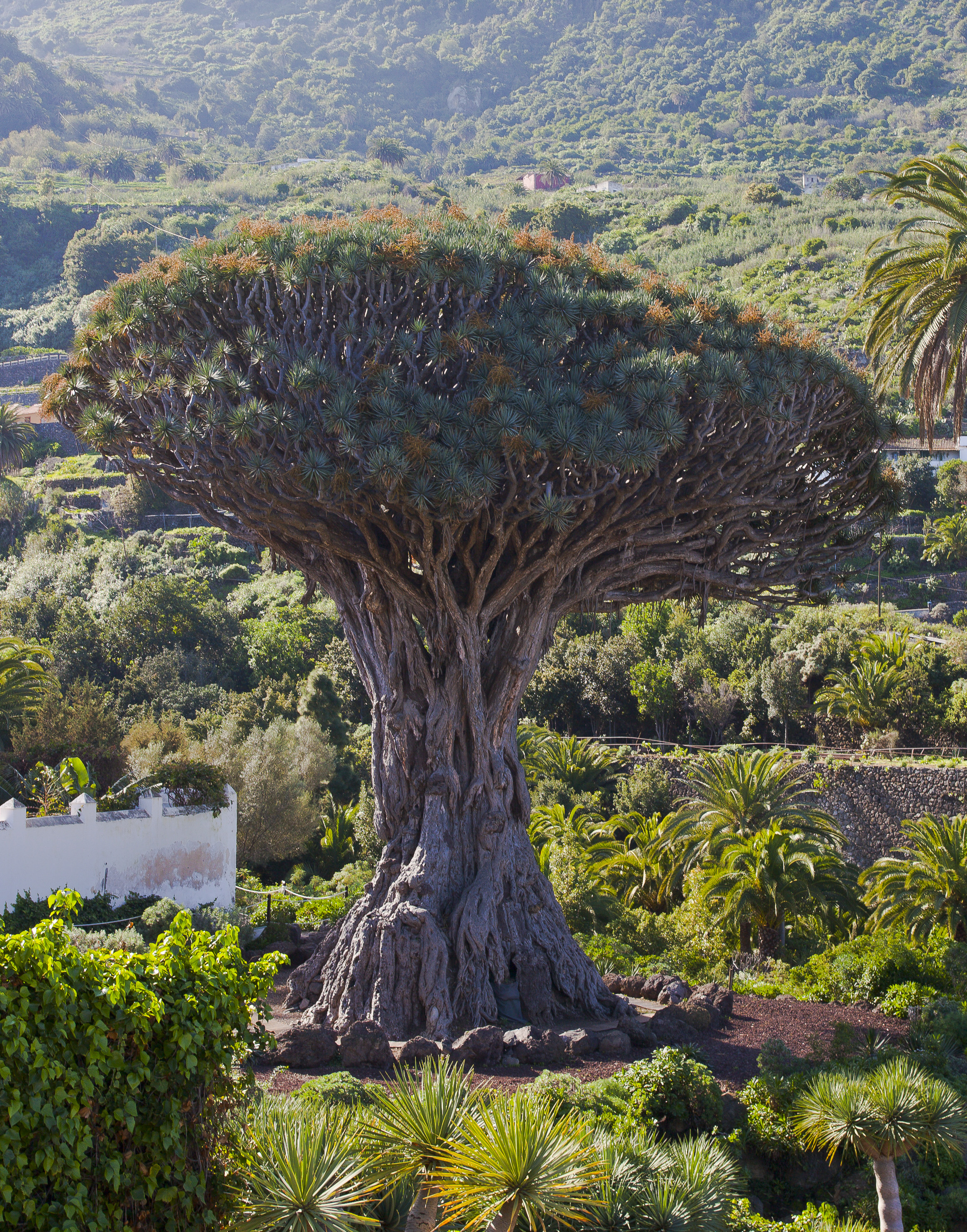
El Drago Milenario

The park has an area of around 3 hectares (7.4 acres). It houses the El Drago Milenario, the oldest and largest specimen of Dracaena draco (dragon tree) in existence, and one of the symbols of Tenerife, estimated to be between 800 and 1,000 years old.

It also has a variety of other plants that are endemic to Tenerife and the Canary Islands, including younger specimens of Dracaena draco, cardoons, and tabaibas. It also houses a winery and coal bunker, as well as a cave with a representation of a Guanche burial.

== History ==
The park was created around the El Drago Milenario, and is the main attraction in Icod de los Vinos. It was designed between 1997 and 2000 by two professors of the University of La Laguna, Wilfredo Wildpret de la Torre and Victoria Eugenia Martín Osorio, and is in the Caforiño ravine, next to the Iglesia de San Marcos.

The erection of a stone wall between the road and the tree when the park was created was controversial, as it prevents the tree from being seen from the nearby Plaza de San Marcos; the compromise was that the stone wall was constructed but with a section of reduced height so that the tree could still be seen from the plaza.

The Drago Milenario in the park has been considered for submission to UNESCO as a world heritage candidate since 2002.

== Operation ==
The park is mostly visited by Spanish citizens, followed by German, English and French nationals.
