= Caves of Don Gaspar =

Site in Icod de los Vinos, Tenerife, Spain

- location in the Canary Islands, Spain
- 28°21′46.49″N 16°43′36.5″W
- Associated with: Guanches
- Location: municipality of Icod de los Vinos, Tenerife, Canary Islands
- Region: Spain

The Caves of Don Gaspar (Spanish: Zona Arqueológica de la Cueva de Las Caves of Don Gaspar) is an important archaeological site located in the north of the island of Tenerife (Canary Islands, Spain).

The cueva is located in the municipality of Icod de los Vinos. It consists of a series of deposits belonging to the ancient Guanche culture, which form an interrelated complex. The caves include the Cave of Don Gaspar itself, the Cave of Las Palomas and three nearby caves. They were inhabited by the aboriginal Guanche Berbers.

In the Cave of Don Gaspar there are three levels of occupation, the oldest from the third century CE, while the occupation level in the Cave of Las Palomas is even older, dating back to the third century BCE.

The caves are however famous for the discovery of plant debris in the form of carbonized seeds of wheat, barley and beans. This finding helps verify the practice of agriculture on the island of Tenerife in times of the Guanches.

The cave is declared a Site of cultural interest by the Government of the Canary Islands.

== See also ==
- Cave of Achbinico
- Cave of the Guanches
