= Los Cancajos =

Coordinates: 28°39′04″N 17°45′35″W

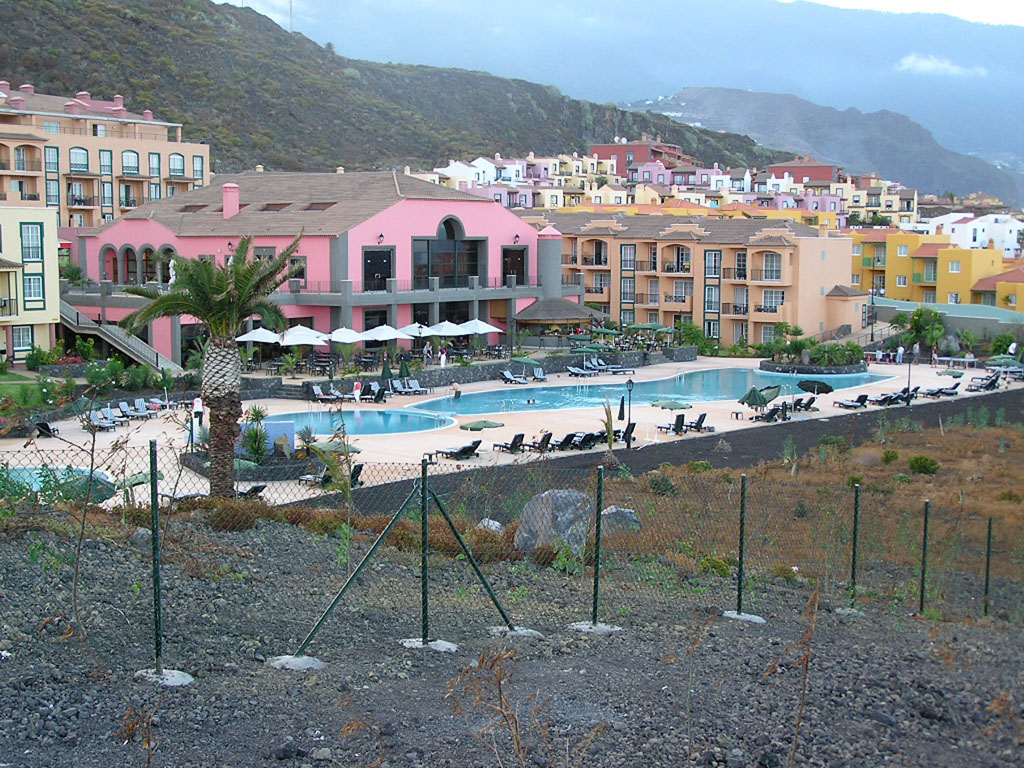
Typical hotels and apartment complexes in Los Cancajos.

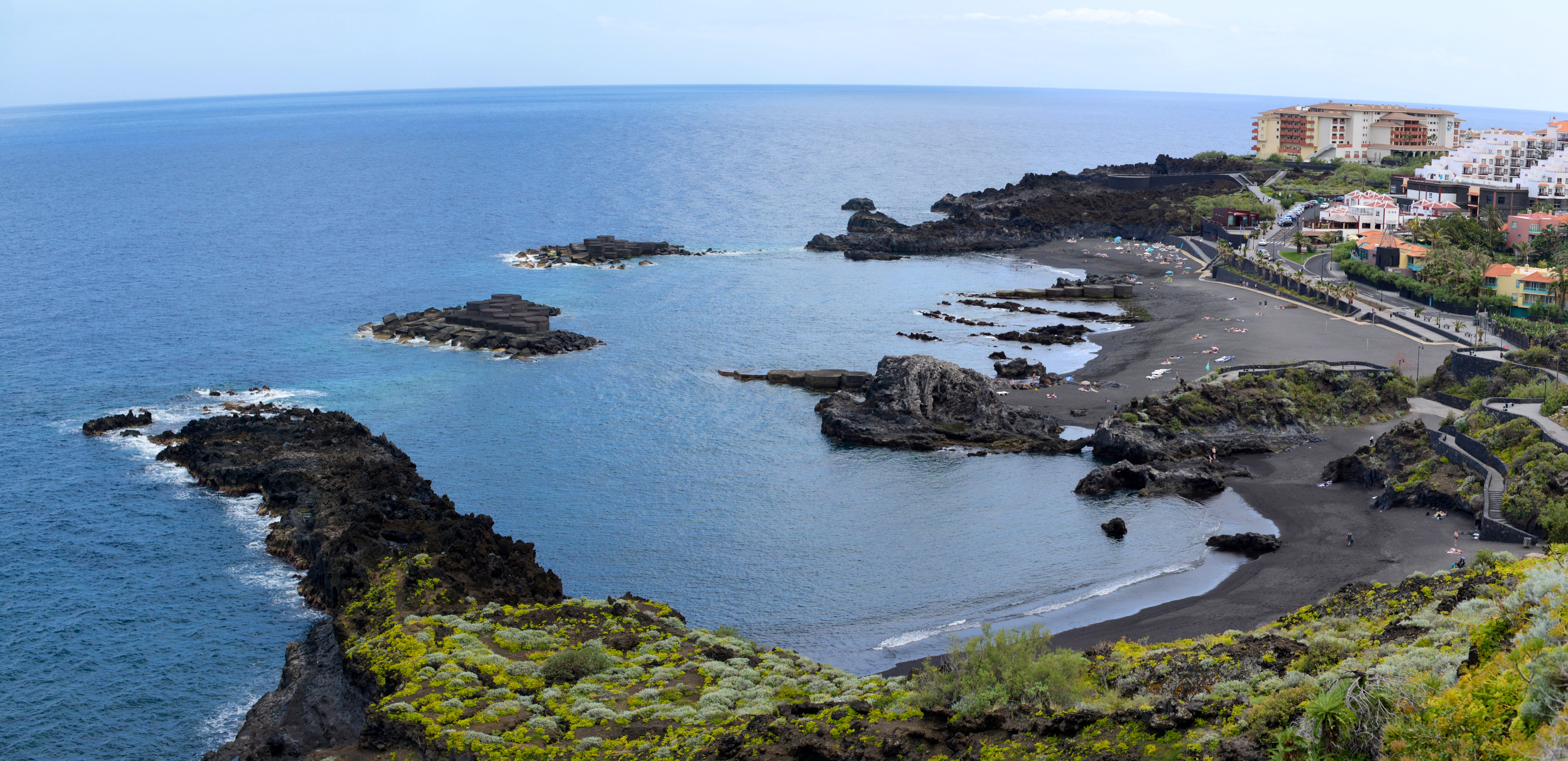
Los Cancajos Beaches

Los Cancajos is a small tourist resort in the Canarian island of La Palma. Its resident population is 713 (2013). It is located in the municipality of Breña Baja on the east coast of La Palma, between the island capital, Santa Cruz de La Palma, and La Palma Airport.

== History ==
The area used to be dominated by salt pans, which fell into disuse, leaving a large, flat area, and was designated for a tourist resort in the 1980s.

== Tourism ==
Los Cancajos has several small beaches of black sand, protected by artificial breakwaters, with some rocky coves and headlands, and a palm-tree lined promenade along the shore. As of 2013, there were 3,724 beds in hotels and tourist apartments in the municipality of Breña Baja (most of which are situated in Los Cancajos), making up about one third of all accommodation on the island.

== Climate ==
Los Cancajos has a hot semi-arid climate which is heavily influenced by the Atlantic Ocean. The following climate chart is from the La Palma Airport, located 2 km south of Los Cancajos:

Climate data for La Palma Airport 33m (1981-2010)
Month	Jan	Feb	Mar	Apr	May	Jun	Jul	Aug	Sep	Oct	Nov	Dec	Year
Record high °C (°F)	27.0 (80.6)	31.0 (87.8)	32.8 (91.0)	36.6 (97.9)	32.4 (90.3)	29.4 (84.9)	38.4 (101.1)	38.0 (100.4)	36.8 (98.2)	34.4 (93.9)	31.6 (88.9)	28.1 (82.6)	38.4 (101.1)
Mean daily maximum °C (°F)	20.6 (69.1)	20.7 (69.3)	21.2 (70.2)	21.6 (70.9)	22.6 (72.7)	24.1 (75.4)	25.5 (77.9)	26.3 (79.3)	26.6 (79.9)	25.5 (77.9)	23.5 (74.3)	21.8 (71.2)	23.3 (74.0)
Daily mean °C (°F)	18.1 (64.6)	18.0 (64.4)	18.5 (65.3)	18.9 (66.0)	20.0 (68.0)	21.7 (71.1)	23.1 (73.6)	23.9 (75.0)	24.0 (75.2)	22.8 (73.0)	20.9 (69.6)	19.3 (66.7)	20.8 (69.4)
Mean daily minimum °C (°F)	15.5 (59.9)	15.3 (59.5)	15.7 (60.3)	16.2 (61.2)	17.4 (63.3)	19.2 (66.6)	20.7 (69.3)	21.4 (70.5)	21.3 (70.3)	20.2 (68.4)	18.3 (64.9)	16.7 (62.1)	18.2 (64.7)
Record low °C (°F)	9.4 (48.9)	10.9 (51.6)	10.2 (50.4)	10.0 (50.0)	11.0 (51.8)	15.2 (59.4)	14.9 (58.8)	16.7 (62.1)	16.4 (61.5)	15.3 (59.5)	10.0 (50.0)	10.0 (50.0)	9.4 (48.9)
Average rainfall mm (inches)	49 (1.9)	57 (2.2)	33 (1.3)	19 (0.7)	7 (0.3)	2 (0.1)	1 (0.0)	1 (0.0)	12 (0.5)	41 (1.6)	70 (2.8)	80 (3.1)	372 (14.5)
Average rainy days	5	4	4	3	1	0	0	0	2	5	7	8	40
Mean monthly sunshine hours	141	146	177	174	192	188	222	209	187	175	140	138	2,106
Source: Agencia Estatal de Meteorología
