= Dragos Gemelos =

Two Dracaena draco trees in La Palma, Canary Islands

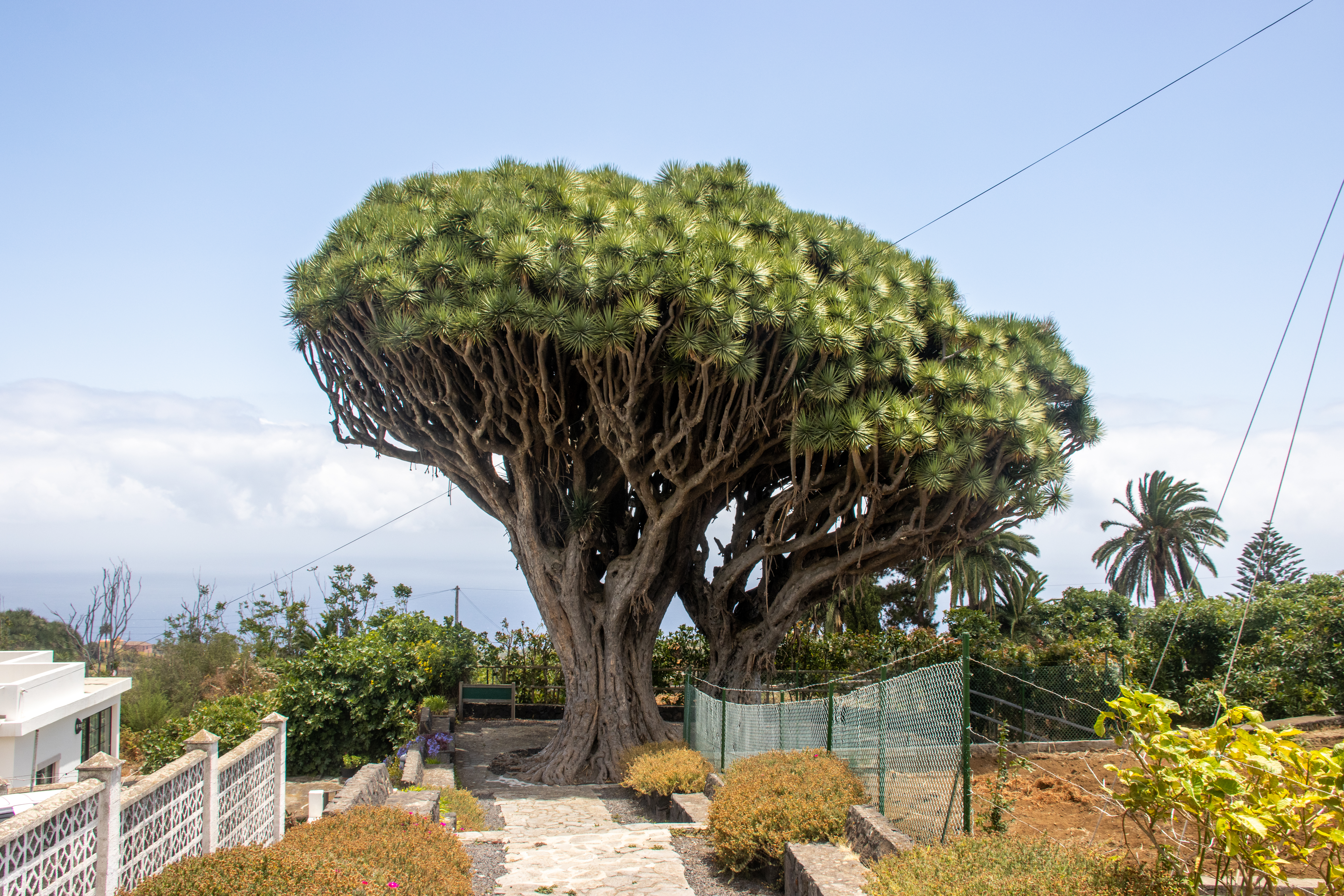

- Location within Canary Islands
- Species: Dracaena draco
- Location: La Palma, Canary Islands
- Coordinates: 28°38′53″N 17°47′15″W
- Height: 15 metres (49 ft)

The Dragos Gemelos are two entwined Dracaena draco trees in Breña Alta, La Palma, Canary Islands. They are said to represent twin brothers who both fell in love with the same woman, and fought to the death, with the woman planting the twin trees to remember them.

== Description ==
The trees are located in Breña Alta, 380 metres above sea level and close to the LP-301 road. They are in a small garden, with a corridor from the road to the square where the trees are located, which is surrounded by a hedge of avocado and fig trees. They are sheltered from the wind by nearby houses, and supported by two trunks.

The two trees are about 5 feet (1.5 m) apart, and have both grown to the same height of 15 metres (49 ft). They are around 200–250 years old, and are thought to have been planted around the same time, although the northern tree has a larger trunk diameter (around 4 metres (13 ft)). The tree branches, where they meet, are closely interwoven.

They were located in the Las Gallanias farm, owned by Servando Perez, and were used for animal fodder. The trees have been depicted in the municipal heraldry of Breña Alta City Council since 1990, and the area that the trees live on is now owned by the City Council. The trees are freely accessible, at a sharp bend of a nearby road.

Neither tree has internal hollows or aerial roots. The southern tree has a large part of its trunk that is missing bark.

== Legend ==
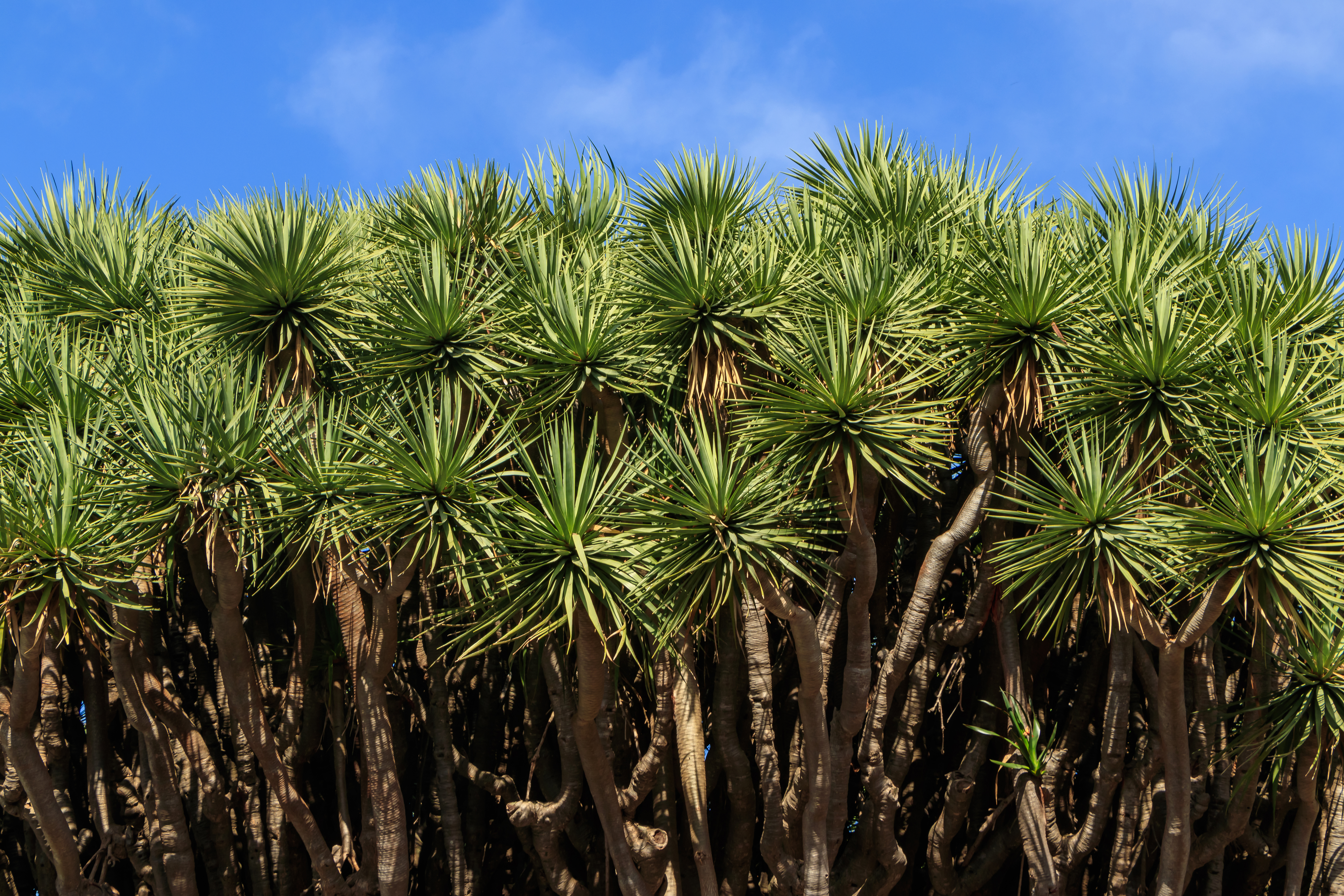
Part of the tree tops

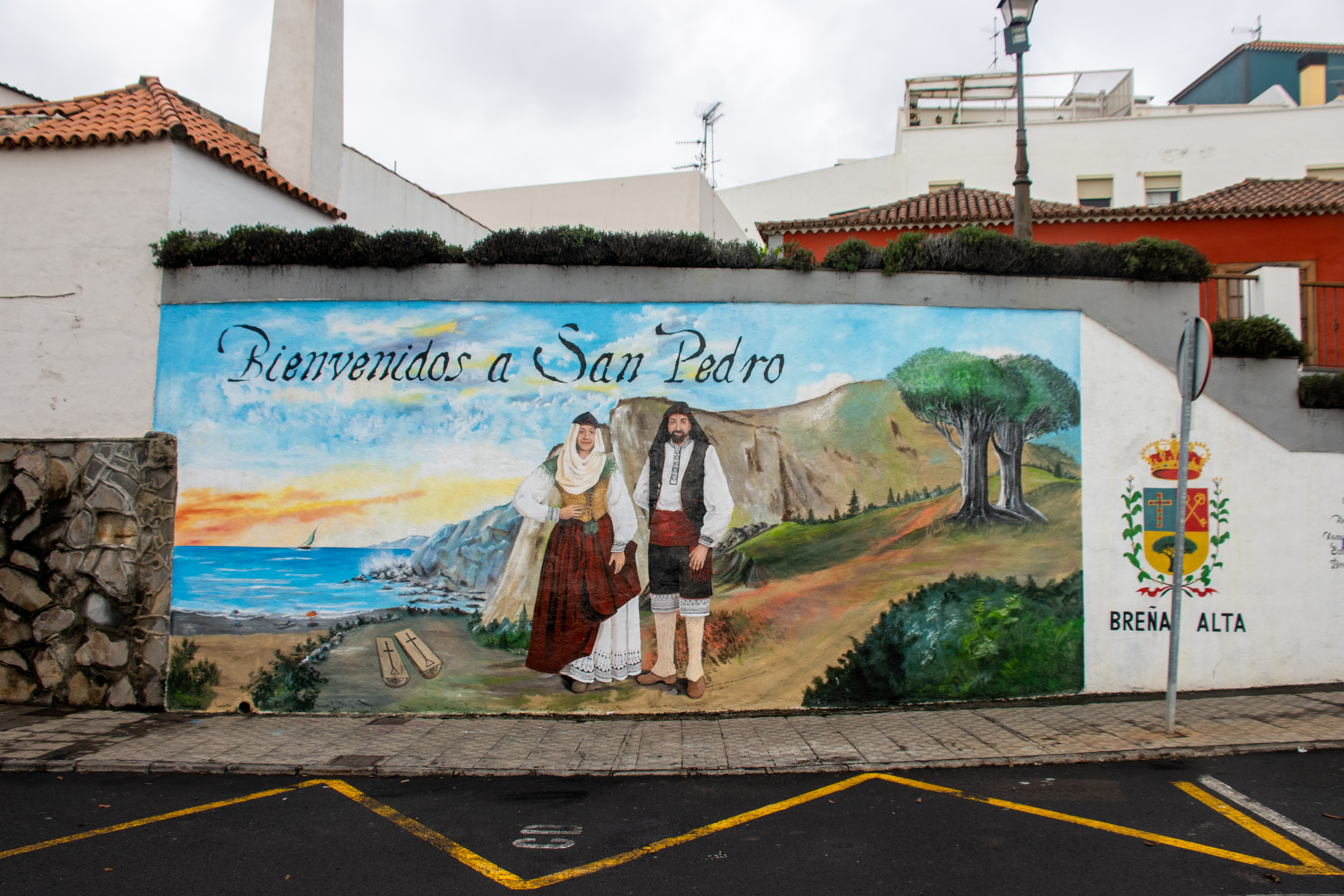
A mural depicting the trees, in San Pedro de Breña Alta

There are several versions of the legend about the trees.

One says that twin brothers, Urente and Timizara, natives of the area, both fell in love with a maiden named Urbina. The twins fought each other to both of their deaths, and Urbina planted two dragon trees at the location of their deaths to remember them, devoting her life to looking after the trees and their memory.

Another says that the two trees were planted by a woman in love with two twin brothers to get their attention.

It is said that the blood of the brothers flows in the trees, which has helped keep them alive for a very long time. Dragon trees excrete a red resin when their bark is cut ("Dragon's blood").
