= Dracaena draco =

- Dracaena draco in Gran Canaria

Conservation status
- Endangered (IUCN 3.1)

Scientific classification
- Kingdom: Plantae
- Clade: Tracheophytes
- Clade: Angiosperms
- Clade: Monocots
- Order: Asparagales
- Family: Asparagaceae
- Subfamily: Convallarioideae
- Genus: Dracaena
- Species: D. draco

Binomial name
- Dracaena draco (L.) L.

Synonyms
- Palma draco (L.) Mill.; Asparagus draco L.; Dracaena resinifera Salisb.; Draco arbor Garsault; Draco draco (L.) Linding.; Draco dragonalis Crantz; Drakaina draco (L.) Raf.; Stoerkia draco (L.) Crantz; Yucca draco (L.) Carrière

Species of flowering plant

Dracaena draco, the Canary Islands dragon tree or drago, is a subtropical tree in the genus Dracaena, native to the Macaronesia archipelago (the Canary Islands, Cape Verde, and Madeira; possibly introduced in the Azores) and northwestern mainland Africa.

It was first described by Carl Linnaeus in 1762 as Asparagus draco. In 1767 he assigned it to the new genus, Dracaena.

== Description ==
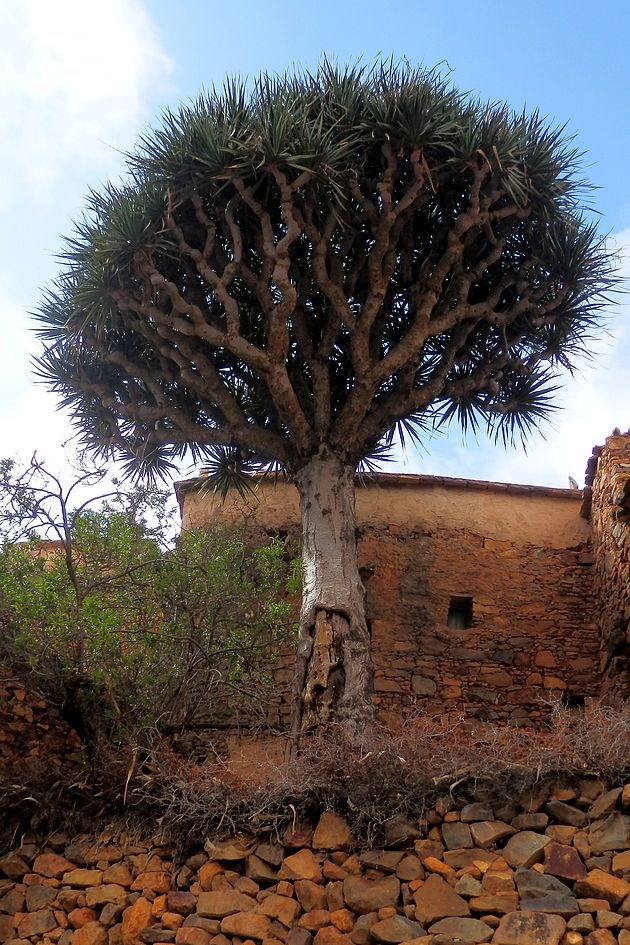
Dracaena draco subsp. ajgal in the village Agadir Ougjgal near Tiznit, Morocco

Dracaena draco is an evergreen long lived tree capable of exceeding 15 m (49 ft) in height and having a trunk of 5 m (16 ft) or more in circumference, starting with a smooth bark that evolves to a more rough texture as it ages. The "dragon tree" is a Monocot, with a branching growth pattern currently placed in the asparagus family (Asparagaceae, subfamily Nolinoidae). When young it has a single stem. At about 10–15 years of age the stem stops growing and produces a flower spike with white, lily-like perfumed flowers, followed by coral berries. Soon a crown of terminal buds appears and the plant starts branching. Each branch grows for about 10–15 years and re-branches, so that a mature plant has an umbrella-like habit. It grows slowly, requiring about 10 years to reach 1.2 metres (4 ft) in height, but at times, grows much faster.

Despite being a monocotyledon, it has annual growth rings. There is considerable genetic variation within the Canary Island dragon trees. The form found on Gran Canaria is now treated as a separate species, Dracaena tamaranae, based on differences in flower structure. The form endemic to La Palma, initially branches very low with numerous, nearly vertical branches arranged fastigiately. There is a forest of such trees at Las Tricias, Garafia district, La Palma.

Subspecies:

- D. draco subsp. draco: Endemic to Madeira and Canary Islands
- D. draco subsp. ajgal Benabid & Cuzin: Endemic to Morocco
- D. draco subsp. caboverdeana Marrero Rodr. & R.S.Almeida: Endemic to the Cape Verde islands

Plants of the World Online considers the Moroccan and Cape Verdean forms to be separate species, Dracaena ajgal and Dracaena caboverdeana.

== Distribution and habitat ==
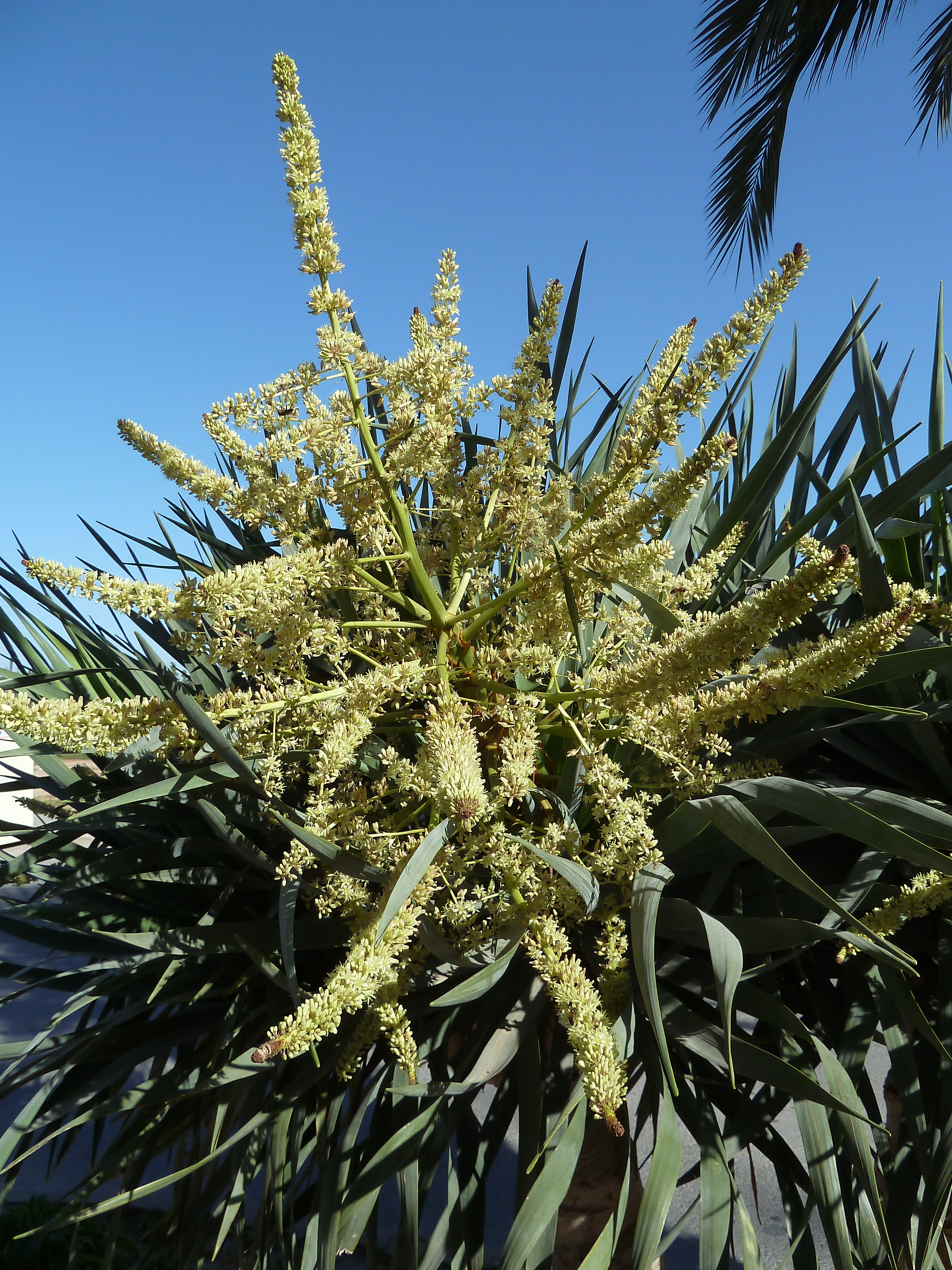
Inflorescence

Dracaena draco is native to Macaronesia and southwest Morocco, where it is commonly cultivated as an ornamental plant. On the Canary and Madeira archipelagos, wild endemic populations today are known only in Tenerife and Madeira after recently going extinct in the wild in Gran Canaria. Wild populations in Morocco extend to the southwest Atlas Mountains. Its origin on the Azores is uncertain but it is thought to result from an introduction made by the Portuguese prior to 1500 with seeds from Madeira and Cape Verde, as some individuals were observed to have similarities with the Cape Verdean subspecies (subsp. caboverdeana); there are around 200-300 individuals on remote sites in the island of São Jorge and a few more on other islands and it is unknown if these populations can be considered native or the result of an early introduction.

== Uses ==
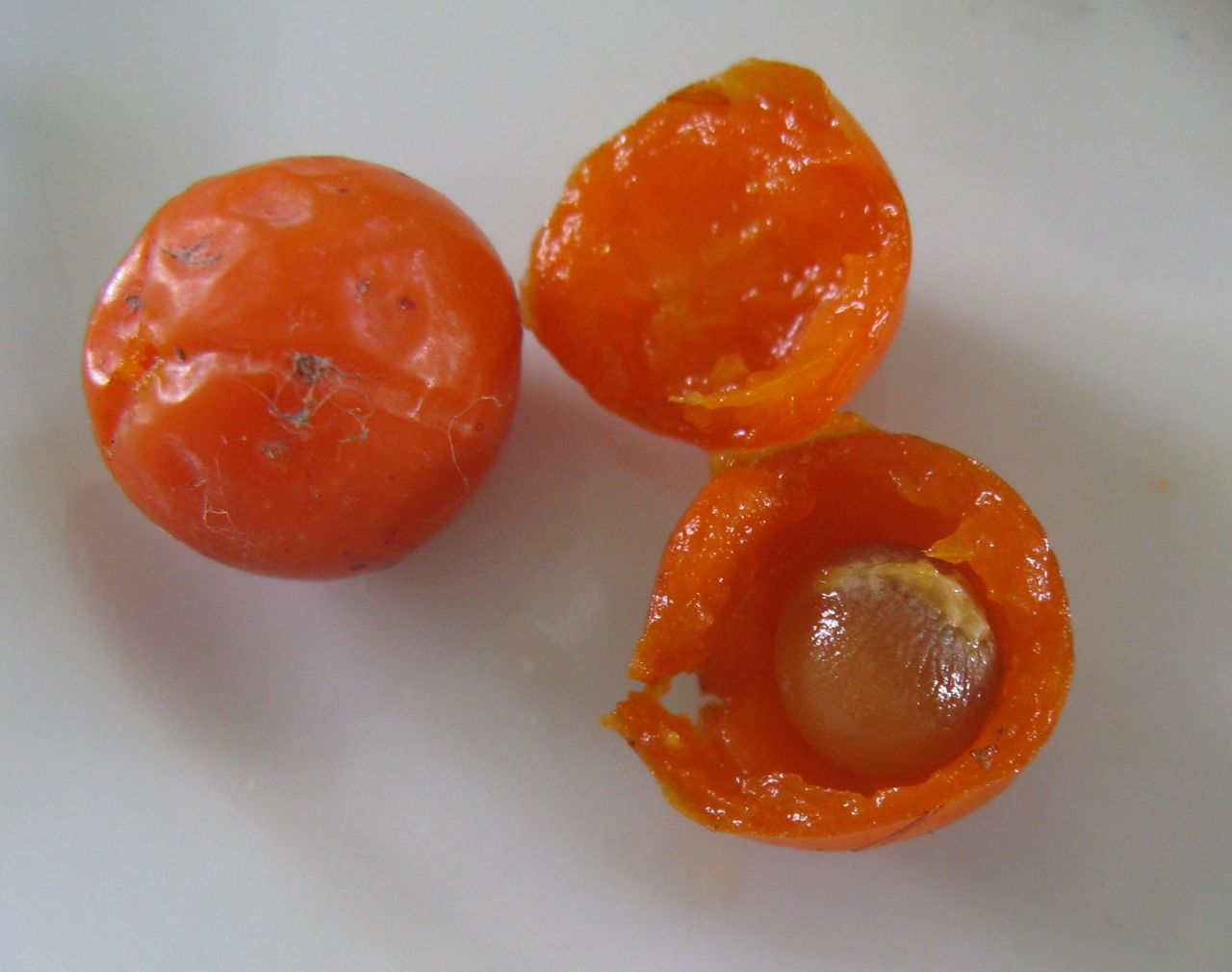
Fruits

When the bark or leaves are cut they secrete a reddish resin, one of several sources of substances known as dragon's blood. Red resins from this tree contain many mono- and dimeric flavans that contribute to the red color of the resins. Dragon's blood has a number of traditional medical uses, although dragon's blood obtained from Dracaena draco was not known until the 15th century, and analyses suggest that most dragon's blood used in art was obtained from species of the genus Calamus formerly placed in Daemonorops. The primary and secondary plant body are the site of the secretory plant tissues that form dragon's blood. These tissues include ground parenchyma cells and cortex cells. Dragon's blood from Dracaena draco and Dracaena cinnabari can be distinguished by differences in 10 compounds and a dominant flavonoid DrC11 missing in Dracaena draco.

The Guanches worshiped a specimen in Tenerife, and hollowed its trunk into a small sanctuary. Alexander von Humboldt saw it at the time of his visit. It was 70 feet (21 m) tall and 45 feet (14 m) in circumference, and was estimated to be 6,000 years old. It was destroyed by a storm in 1868.

== Cultivation ==
Dracaena draco is cultivated and widely available as an ornamental tree for parks, gardens, and drought tolerant water conserving sustainable landscape projects. It has gained the Royal Horticultural Society's Award of Garden Merit.

In 2017, the city of Angra do Heroísmo (Terceira Island) planted a grove of 200 dragon trees.

The Museum of Wine on Pico Island, Azores, has one of the largest concentrations of this species in Macaronesia, some being more than 100 years old.

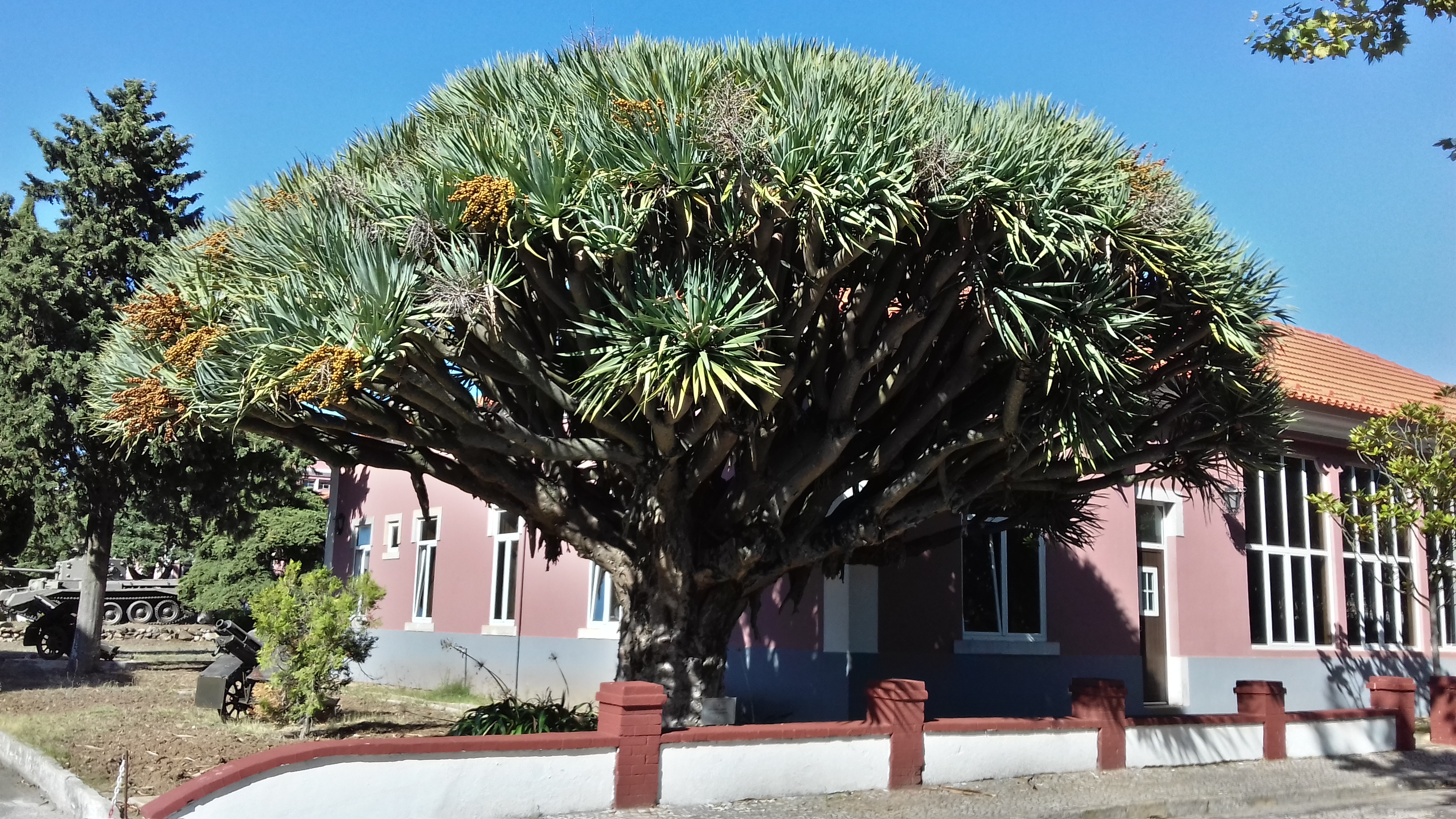
A large dragon's blood tree in Amadora, Portugal

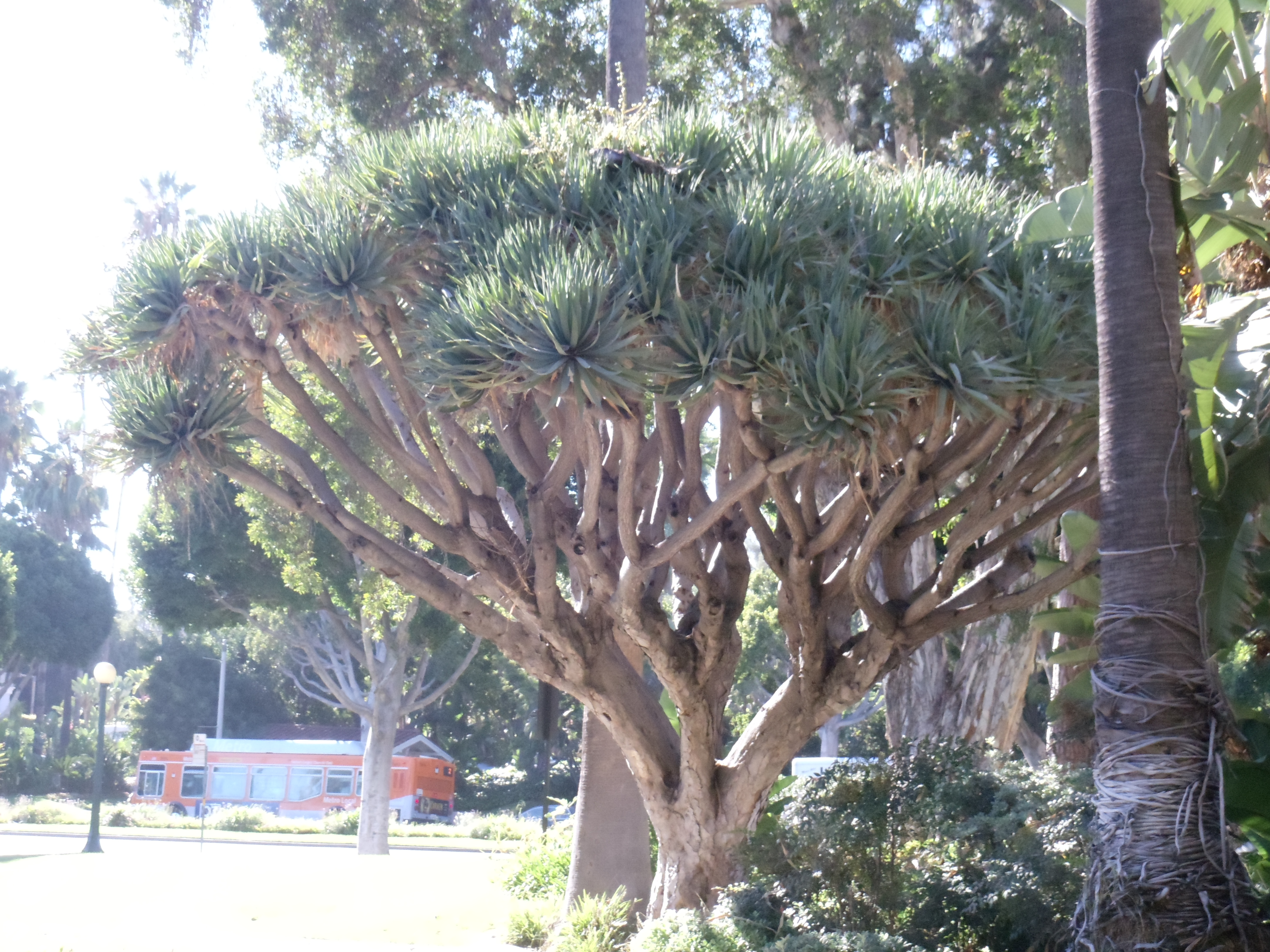
Dragon tree in the Will Rogers Memorial Park in Beverly Hills, California

== Symbolism ==
Dracaena draco is the natural symbol of the island of Tenerife, together with the blue chaffinch.

== Notable trees ==
Photo	Name	Location
	El Drago Milenario	Icod de los Vinos, Tenerife
	Dragos Gemelos	Breña Alta, La Palma

== See also ==
- List of animal and plant symbols of the Canary Islands
- Wildlife of Cape Verde#Flora
- Dracaena cinnabari

== General bibliography ==
- Arkive: Dracaena draco factsheet.
- Dracaena draco in Morocco (photo gallery).
- The climate requirements for Dracaena draco defined by its borders: Northernmost tree in the world, near 40°, northern Azores Islands and Southernmost dragon tree in the world, near 38°, Victoria, Australia (photos).
- Benabid, A. & Cuzin, F. (1997). Dragon tree (Dracaena draco subsp. ajgal Benabid et Cuzin) populations in Morocco: Taxonomical, biogeographical and phytosociological values. Comptes Rendus de l'Académie des Sciences Série III Sciences de la Vie 320(3): 267–277.
