= El Drago Milenario =

Giant tree in Icod de los Vinos, Tenerife

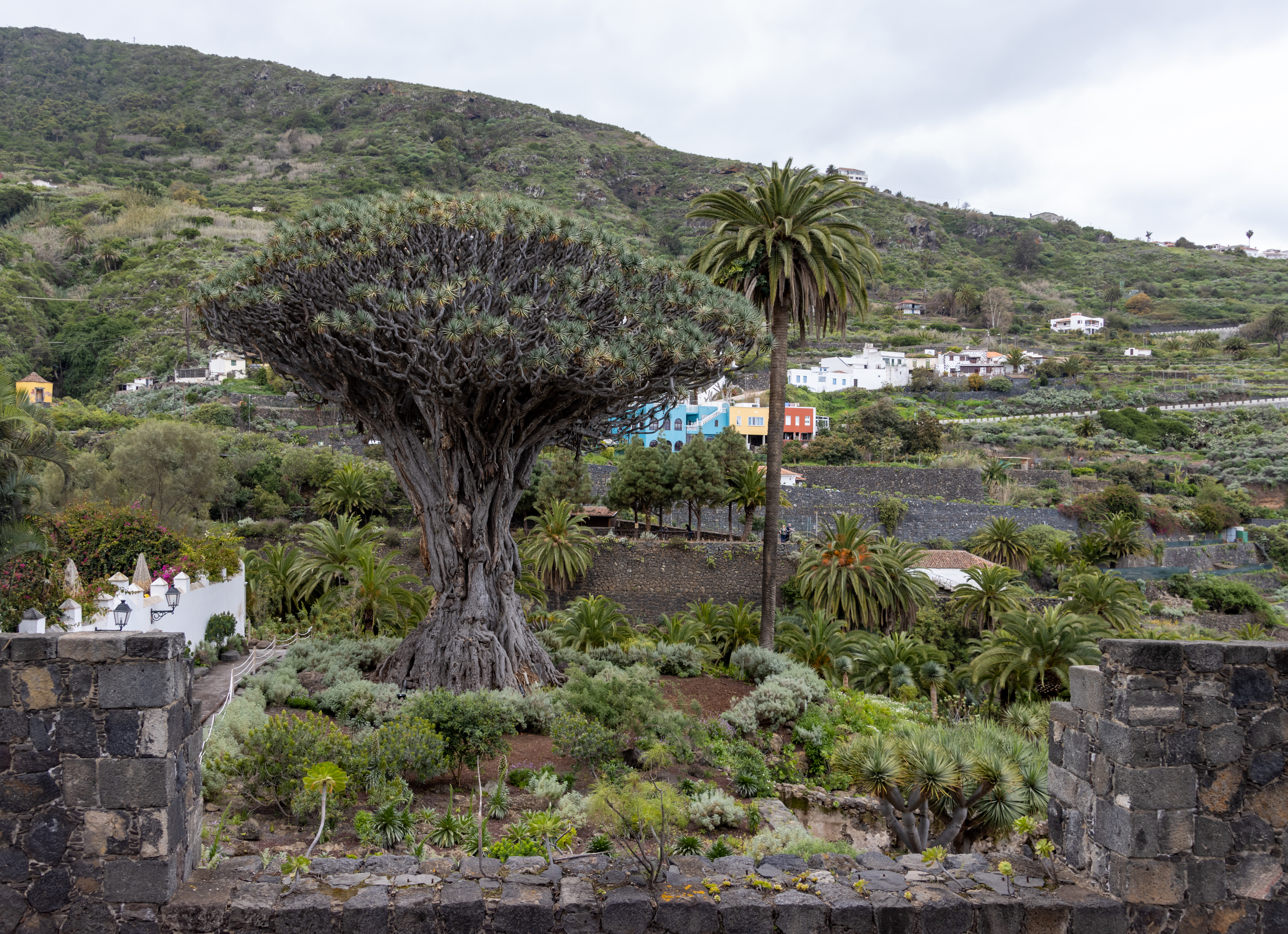
- El Drago seen from the public viewing area

- Location within Tenerife
- Species: Canary Islands dragon tree (Dracaena draco)
- Location: Parque del Drago, Icod de los Vinos, Tenerife, Spain
- Coordinates: 28°22′00″N 16°43′20″W
- Height: 21 m (69 ft)
- Girth: 20 m (66 ft)

El Drago, also known as Drago Milenario and Drago de Icod de los Vinos, is the oldest and largest living specimen of Dracaena draco, or dragon tree, in Parque del Drago, Icod de los Vinos, Tenerife, Spain. It is said to be a thousand years old, although the age is disputed. It is one of the symbols of Tenerife, and was declared a national monument in 1917.

== Description ==
It is the largest and oldest living specimen of Dracaena draco (common name dragon tree). It is in Parque del Drago, Icod de los Vinos in Tenerife. It is around 20–21 metres (66–69 ft) tall, with a circumference around 20 metres (66 ft). It has over 300 main branches. The trunk contains a 6-metre-high (20 ft) cavity accessible by a door, with a fan installed to provide ventilation. It is estimated to weigh around 140 tonnes (150 short tons). When it flowered in 1995, it had around 1,800 flowering branches, with its weight increasing by 3.5 tonnes (3.9 short tons) during the fruiting season.

It is one of the symbols of Tenerife. It was depicted on the 1,000 peseta note. It is part of the coat of arms for the Icod de los Vinos municipality and appears in local legends. While the Parque del Drago which contains the tree charges for entry, it is visible free of charge from the nearby town square.

== History ==
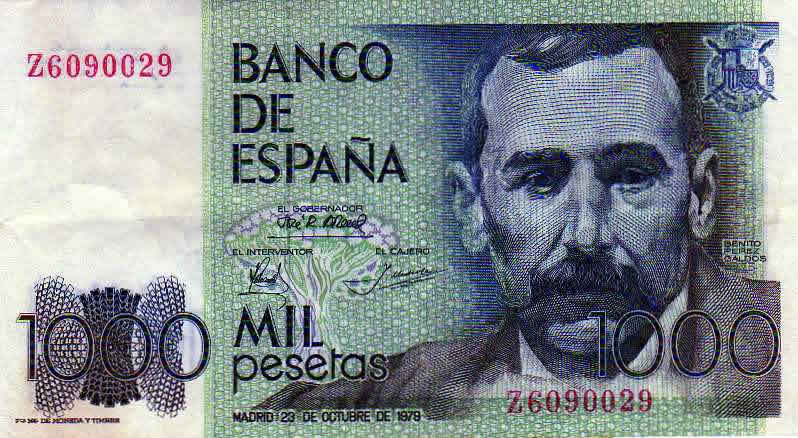
Billet 1000 Pesetas Recto Galdos

The specimen's age is disputed. It is thought to be around 800–1,000 years old. Alexander von Humboldt estimated a similar tree on the island (that fell in a storm in 1867) to be several thousand years old, and a 1907 estimate by professors and students of the Polytechnic School of Zurich put it at 2,500 years old, but an upper limit of 350 years was placed on it in 1975 by Mägdefrau, while other studies suggest that it is around 1,000 years old.

It was declared a national monument in 1917. In the 1930s, part of the base was closed with stones and cement. In 1985 it was studied by arboriculturist Kenneth Alien, who reopened the entrance and installed a large fan inside the trunk cavity to aid air circulation and prevent fungal growth. In 1993 the road that passed within a few metres of the tree was rerouted. Since 2002 it has been considered for submission to UNESCO as a World Heritage Site candidate.

== See also ==
- List of individual trees
