= Dracaena caboverdeana =

Scientific classification
- Kingdom: Plantae
- Clade: Tracheophytes
- Clade: Angiosperms
- Clade: Monocots
- Order: Asparagales
- Family: Asparagaceae
- Subfamily: Nolinoideae
- Genus: Dracaena
- Species: D. caboverdeana

Binomial name
- Dracaena caboverdeana (Marrero Rodr. & R.S.Almeida) Rivas Mart., Lousã, J.C.Costa & Maria C.Duarte

Synonyms
- Dracaena draco subsp. caboverdeana Marrero Rodr. & R.S.Almeida

Species of flowering plant

Dracaena caboverdeana is a species of flowering plant in the family Asparagaceae. It is a tree endemic to the Cape Verde Islands, where it is native to the islands of Santo Antão, São Nicolau, and Fogo.

The species was formerly considered a population of Dracaena draco (dragon's blood tree), which is also native to the Canary Islands. In 2017 Rivas-Martínez et al. identified the Cape Verde population as a distinct species.
