= Dracaena ajgal =

Scientific classification
- Kingdom: Plantae
- Clade: Tracheophytes
- Clade: Angiosperms
- Clade: Monocots
- Order: Asparagales
- Family: Asparagaceae
- Subfamily: Nolinoideae
- Genus: Dracaena
- Species: D. ajgal

Binomial name
- Dracaena ajgal (Benabid & Cuzin) Rivas Mart., Molero Mesa, Marfíl & G.Benítez

Synonyms
- Dracaena draco subsp. ajgal Benabid & Cuzin

Species of flowering plant

Dracaena ajgal is a species of flowering plant in the family Asparagaceae. It is a tree native to southwestern Morocco. It grows on steep rocky slopes of quarzitic and hard ultramafic rock in the western Anti-Atlas range at approximately 700 metres elevation, in the transition between semi-arid Argania–Olea europaea subsp. maroccana and Mediterranean-climate Quercus rotundifolia–Genista segonnei plant communities.

The species was formerly considered a population of Dracaena draco (dragon's blood tree), which is also native to the Canary Islands. In 1997 it was recognized as a distinct subspecies, and in 2020 Rivas-Martínez et al. identified the Moroccan population as a distinct species.
