= Breña Baja =

- Municipality
- Flag Coat of arms

- Location in Canary Islands Breña Baja (Spain, Canary Islands)
- Coordinates: 28°38′N 17°46′W
- Country: Spain
- Autonomous community: Canary Islands
- Province: Santa Cruz de Tenerife
- Island: La Palma

Area
  - Total: 14.2 km^{2} (5.5 sq mi)
- Elevation: 300 m (980 ft)

Population (2025-01-01)
  - Total: 6,159
  - Density: 434/km^{2} (1,120/sq mi)

Breña Baja (Spanish for Lower Breña) is a municipality on the eastern side of the island of La Palma, in the province of Santa Cruz de Tenerife, in the Canary Islands. The ayuntamiento (municipal office) is in the town of San José with an elevation of 300 m. Until the 17th century, the area was known as Breña, but was then divided into Breña Alta and Breña Baja.

La Palma's second largest resort, Los Cancajos, is on the coast. Part of La Palma Airport (formerly Mazo Airport) is located in the municipality.

== Subdivisions ==
The municipality has 8 subdivisions, or "parishes" (population figures from 2005):

- San Antonio (1,128 persons)
- San José (1,042 persons)
- La Polvacera (672 persons)
- Los Cancajos (467 persons)
- Las Ledas (321 persons)
- El Socorro (309 persons)
- La Montaña (257 persons)
- El Fuerte (159 persons)

== Historical population ==
Year	Population
1900	1,816
1910	2,001
1920	1,859
1930	2,042
1940	2,364
1950	2,405
1960	2,505
1970	2,632
1980	3,363
1990	3,418
1991	3,354
1996	3,746
2001	3,621
2002	4,113
2003	4,187
2004	4,186
2005	4,355
2006	4,470
2007	4,708
2013	5,523

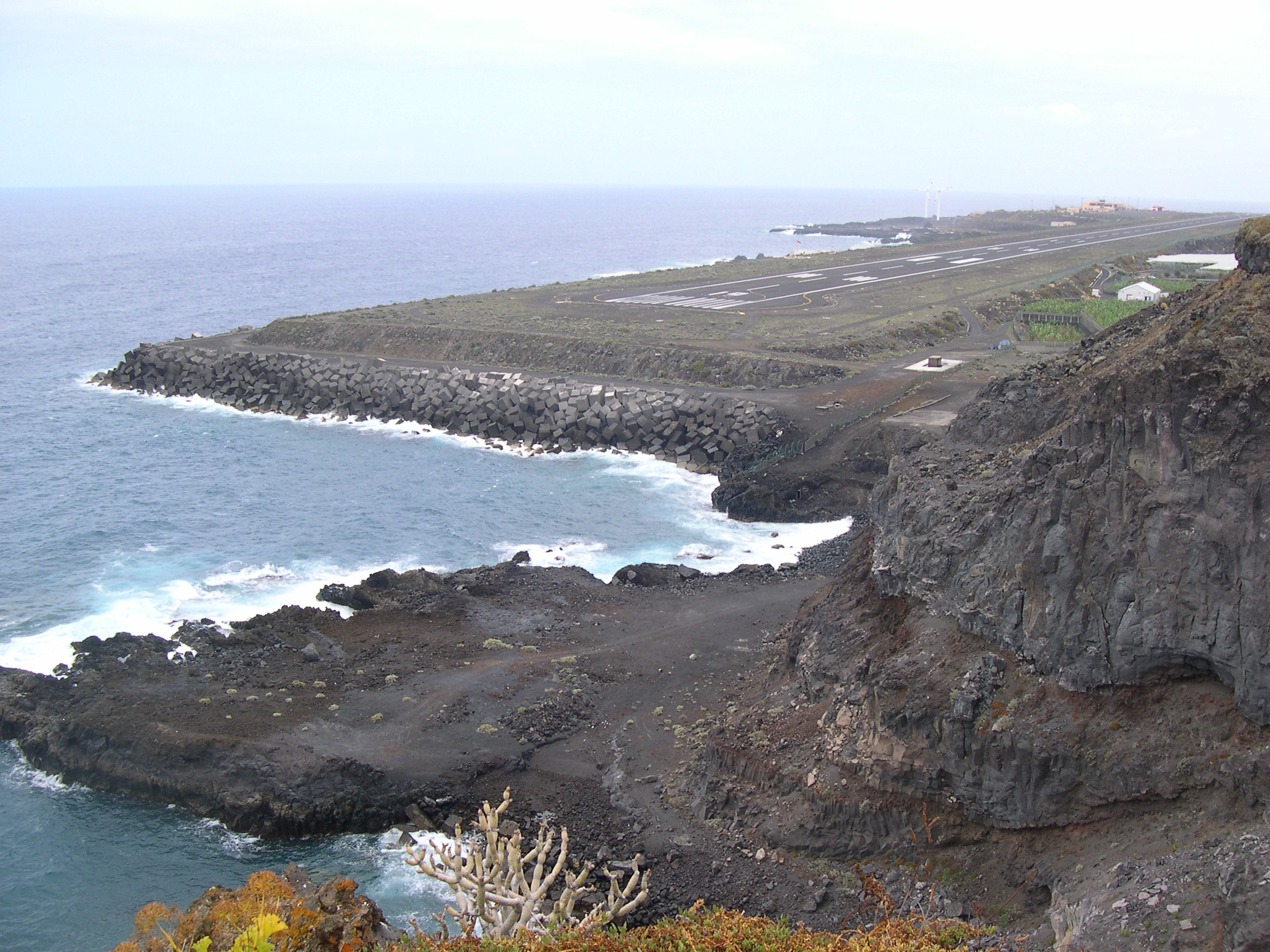
La Palma's Airport

== See also ==
- List of municipalities in Santa Cruz de Tenerife
