= Maroparque =

Rescue centre in the Canary Islands

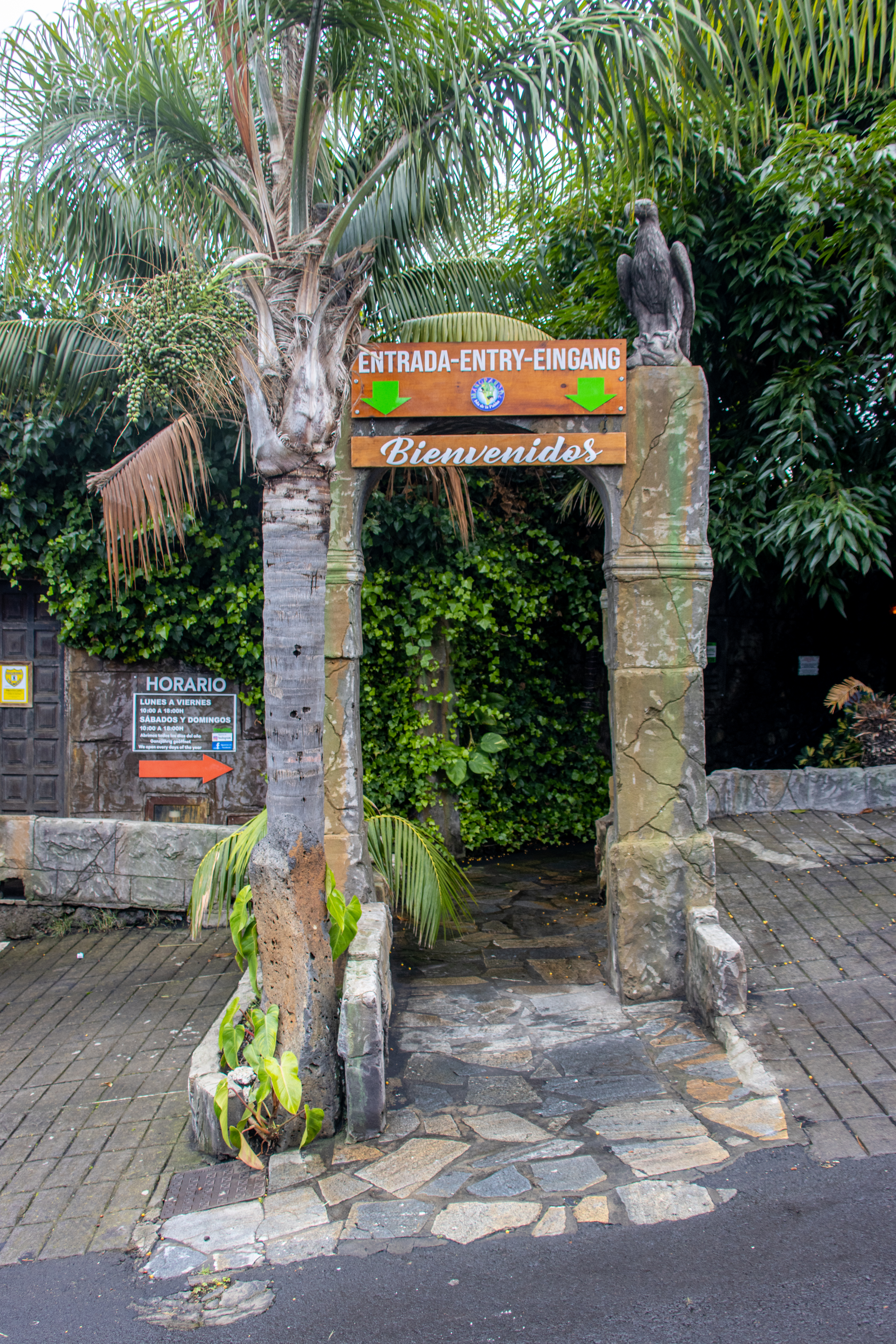
- The entrance to the park
- Interactive map of Maroparque
- 28°40′57″N 17°46′42″W
- Date opened: 2000
- Location: Breña Alta, La Palma
- No. of animals: 450
- Website: http://maroparque.es/

Maroparque fundación is an animal rescue centre in Breña Alta, La Palma, one of the Canary Islands, in Spain. Opened in 2000, it houses around 450 animals. It gained over 250 extra animals during the 2021 volcanic eruption.

== Layout and location ==
The rescue centre is located on the side of the El Galeon ravine in Breña Alta, on the island of La Palma. It has been described as a vertical zoo, with walkways combining cobbled paths and wooden bridges, with walk-through aviaries. It also has a restaurant. It has an area of around 7,000 square metres (75,000 sq ft), with a forest-like environment made with native vegetation.

The centre was inaugurated in 2000, and normally gains around 100 animals per year. In 2021 they received animals affected by the 2021 Cumbre Vieja volcanic eruption, with over 250 extra animals arriving at the centre in the first month of the eruption. The animals are expected to return to their owners where possible, with the centre keeping any unable to do so.

It is named after the Martin Romera family, with 'MaRo' derived from the family name. It is a non-profit organisation. The centre also has research and conservation programs, and does guided tours. It received financial aid from the Cabildo de La Palma during the COVID-19 pandemic.

== Animals ==
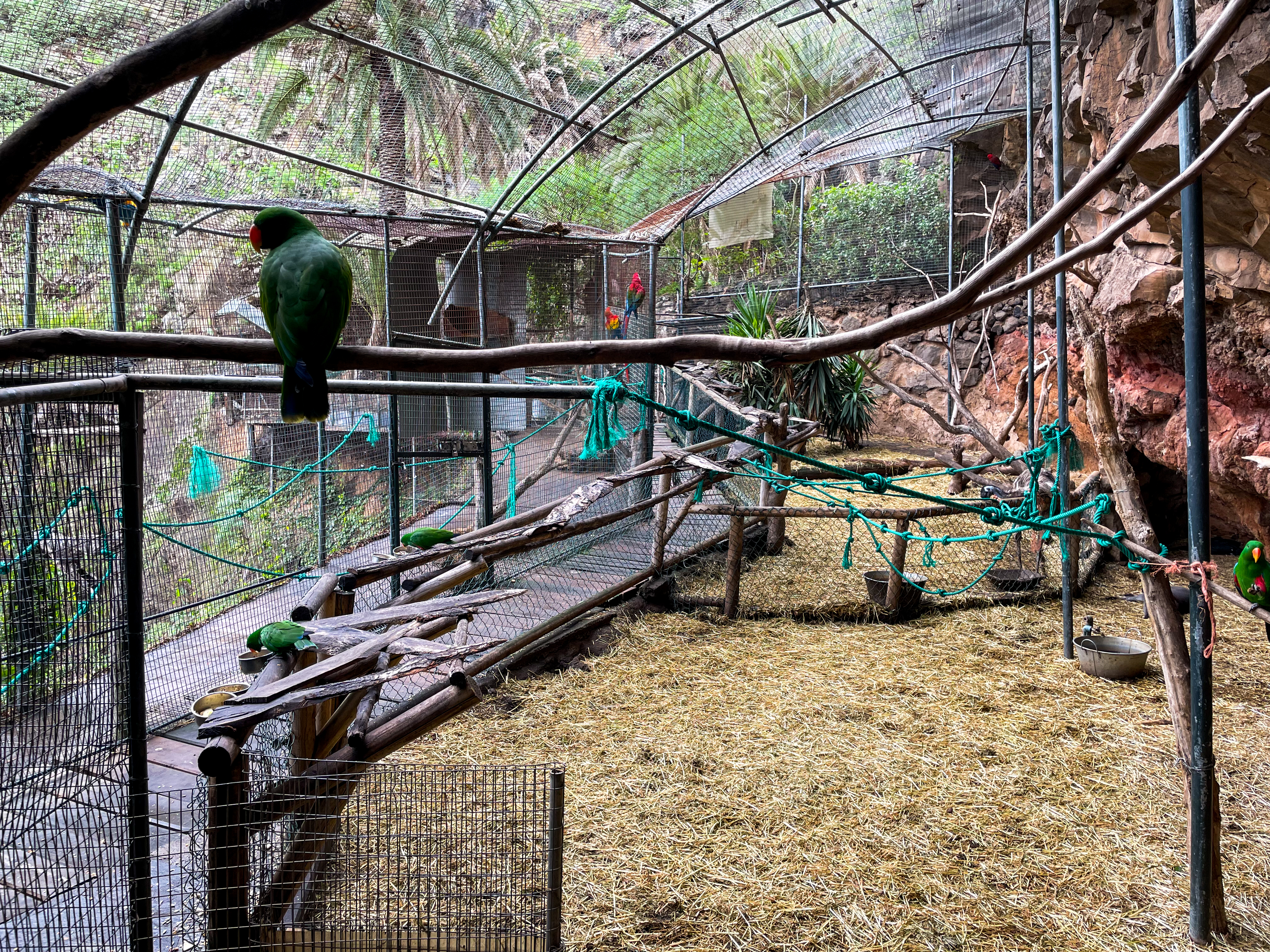
Inside one of the aviaries

The centre contains over 450 animals, often exotic species that have been rescued or seized by the authorities. The animals include both native species for La Palma, and non-native species.

The animals include birds, such as parrots, hens, ostriches, and peacocks; reptiles such as Nile crocodiles and snakes; and mammals, including albino kangaroos, marmosets, porcupines, and monkeys It also has an aquarium.
