= Cueva del Viento =

Coordinates: 28°20′48″N 16°43′20″W

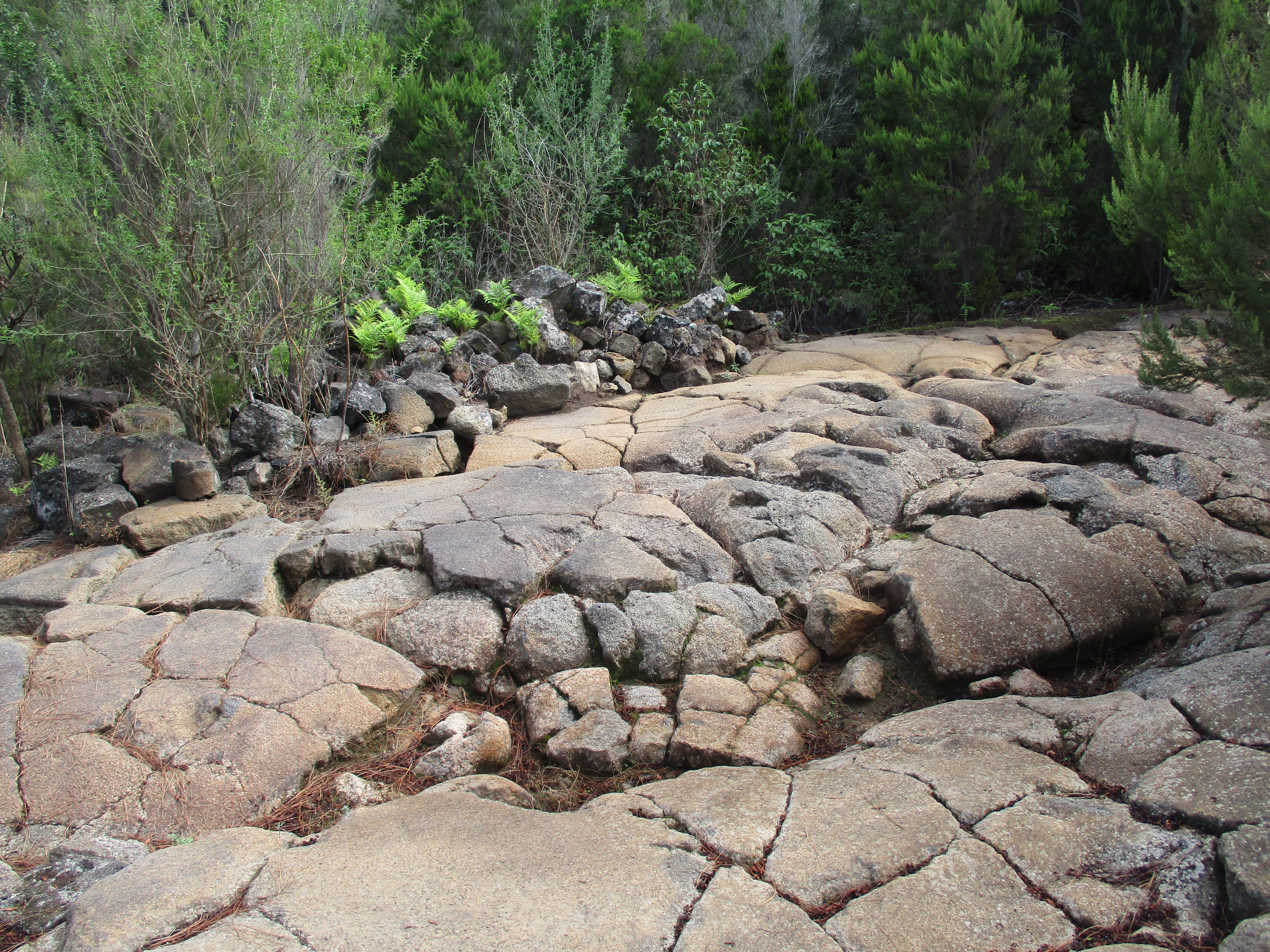
Lava around Cueva del Viento

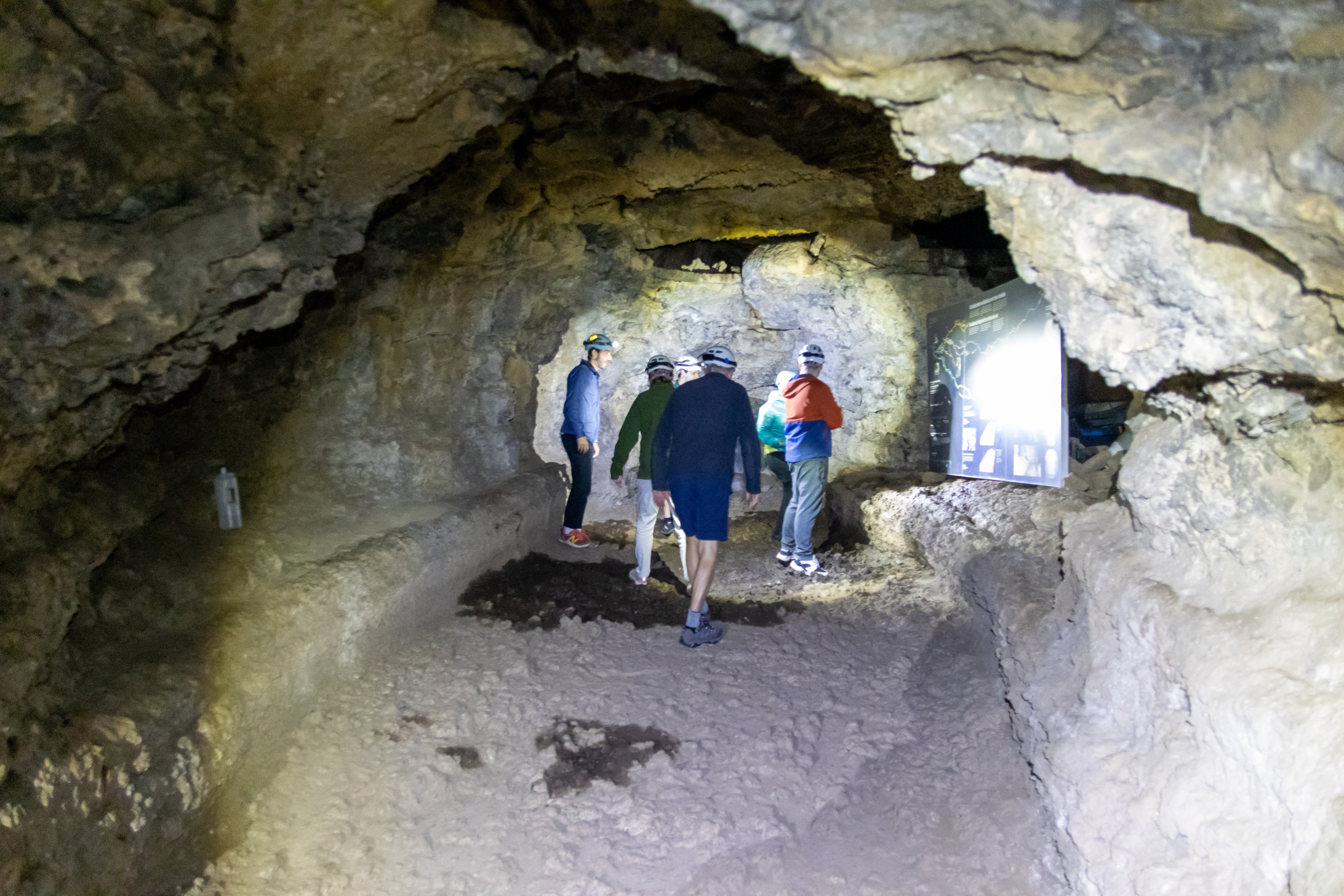
Underground tour of Cueva del Viento

Cueva del Viento ("Wind Cave") is the largest lava tube system in Europe, and the sixth largest in the world, behind a series of lava tubes in Hawaii. It is also considered the most complex volcanic tube in the world, due to its morphology of several levels and passages.

It was created by lava flows from Pico Viejo, next to Mount Teide. The cave is located in the town of Icod de los Vinos in the north of the island of Tenerife, Spain.

It extends more than 17 kilometres (11 mi) and contains three different levels of passageways, each full of geomorphological phenomena such as lava pits and terraces.

The cave is rich in fossils of the "Canarian megafauna". Bones of Gallotia goliath and Canariomys bravoi, an extinct giant lizard and rat, respectively, have been discovered here.

Archaeological remains belonging to the Guanches, the ancient Berber native inhabitants of the Canary Islands, were found in several entries to the tube system.

At present, the Cueva del Viento is a tourist attraction of the island.

== See also ==
- Geology of the Canary Islands
- Tourism in the Canary Islands
