= Breña Alta =

- Municipality
- Flag Coat of arms

- Location in Canary Islands Breña Alta (Spain, Canary Islands)
- Coordinates: 28°40′N 17°47′W
- Country: Spain
- Autonomous community: Canary Islands
- Province: Santa Cruz de Tenerife
- Island: La Palma

Area
  - Total: 30.82 km^{2} (11.90 sq mi)
- Elevation: 350 m (1,150 ft)

Population (2025-01-01)
  - Total: 7,487
  - Density: 242.9/km^{2} (629.2/sq mi)
- Postal code: E-38712

Breña Alta (Spanish for Upper Breña) is a municipality on the eastern side of the island of La Palma, in the province of Santa Cruz de Tenerife, in the Canary Islands. The ayuntamiento (municipal office) is in the town of San Pedro, at 350 m above sea-level, and only 9 km south of the island's capital Santa Cruz de la Palma . Breña Alta lies on the main highway encircling the island, just north of La Palma Airport. Until the 17th century the area was known as Breña, but was then divided into Breña Alta and Breña Baja.

Breña Alta has a fishing port, an artificial beach at Bajamar, and an industrial area. The municipality is known for its tobacco production. There is a 100-year-old dracaena tree near San Isidro. There is also a zoo called Maroparque.

== Subdivisions ==
The municipality has 13 subdivisions, or "parishes" (population figures from 2005):

- Bajamar
- Botazo (pop: 389)
- Breña (pop: 509)
- Buenavista de Abajo (pop: 484)
- Buenavista de Arriba (pop: 605)
- La Cuesta (pop: 684)
- Las Letas (pop: 464)
- El Llanito (pop: 758)
- Miranda (pop: 711)
- San Isidro
- San Pedro (municipal seat) (pop: 2,434)
- El Socorro
- Las Vueltas

== Historical population ==
Year	Population
1900	2,589
1910	2,863
1920	3,078
1930	3,437
1940	3,843
1950	4,049
1960	4,762
1970	4,290
1981	4,792
1990	5,467
1991	5,432
1996	5,816
2001	5,715
2002	6,396
2003	6,665
2004	6,847
2005	7,039
2006	7,158
2007	7,184
2013	7,455

== See also ==
- List of municipalities in Santa Cruz de Tenerife
