= Museo Guanche =

Ethnographic museum in Icod de los Vinos, Tenerife, Spain

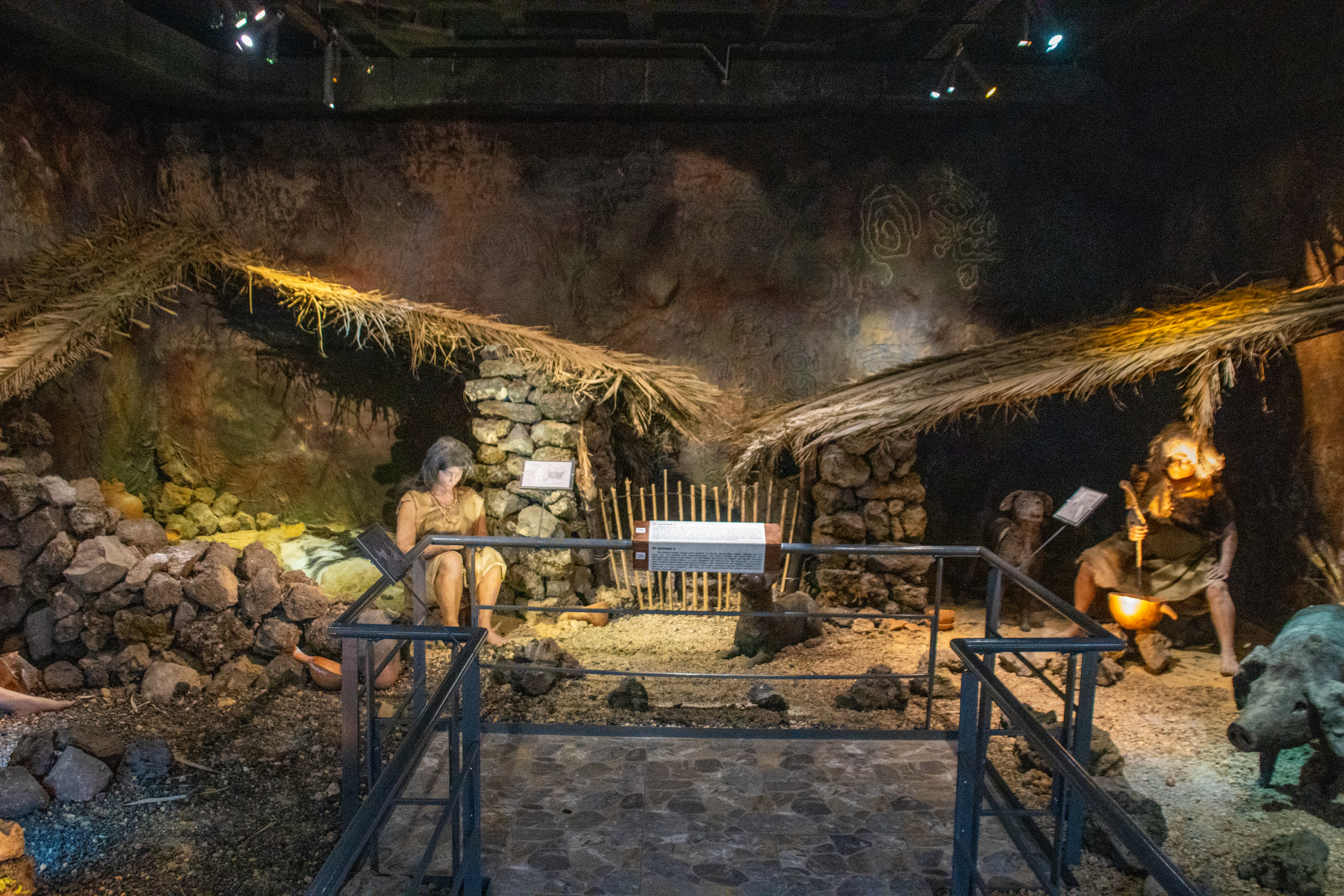

- Location within Tenerife
- Location: Icod de los Vinos, Spain
- Type: Ethnographic museum
- Website: Official website

Museo Guanche is an ethnographic museum in Icod de los Vinos, Tenerife. It is focused on the Guanches, the native inhabitants of the Canary Islands. It is located in the 'La Magalona' shopping centre. It contains life-sized scenes of Guanche culture, and recreations of paintings and petroglyphs from various parts of the islands. As of 2020, entrance fees are €6 for adults, and €3 for children.
