= La Palma Airport =

La Palma Airport Aeropuerto de La Palma

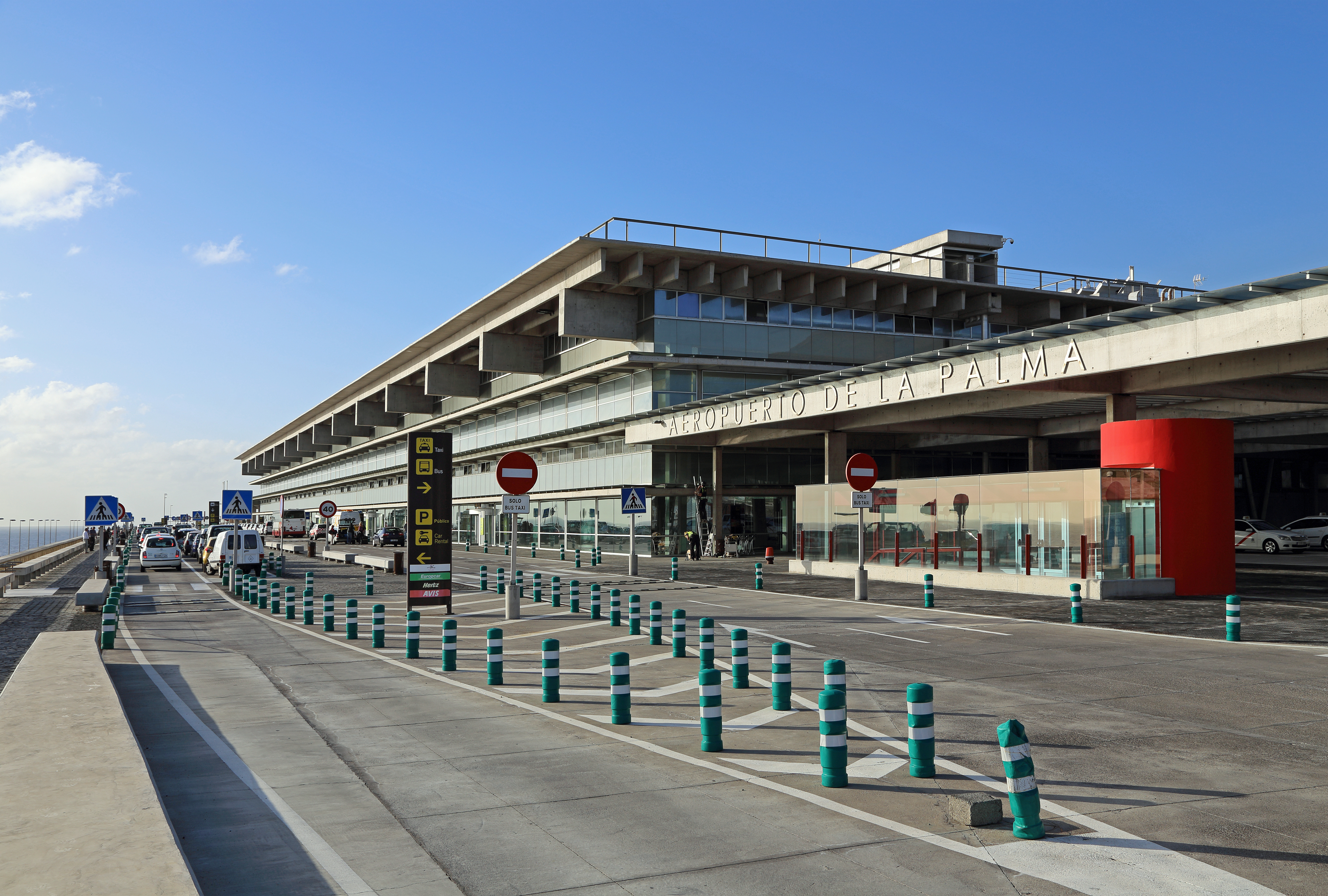
- IATA: SPC; ICAO: GCLA

Summary
- Airport type: Public
- Owner/Operator: AENA
- Serves: La Palma
- Location: Breña Baja and Villa de Mazo
- Elevation AMSL: 33 m (108 ft)
- Coordinates: 28°37′35″N 017°45′20″W

Map
- Location within Spain

Runways
Direction	Length		Surface
Direction	m	ft	Surface
18/36	2,200	7,218	Asphalt

Statistics (2018)
- Passengers: 1.420.277 ▲9.0%
- Operations: 22.033 ▲24.1%
- Cargo (t): 565 ▼8.4%
- Source: Spanish AIP at EUROCONTROL, Aena

La Palma Airport (Spanish: Aeropuerto de La Palma) (IATA: SPC, ICAO: GCLA) is an airport located in Breña Baja and Villa de Mazo, 8 km (5.0 mi) south of the city of Santa Cruz de La Palma on La Palma in the Canary Islands. It is operated by Aeropuertos Españoles y Navegación Aérea (AENA), who operate the majority of civil airports in Spain.

The airport is served mainly by Binter Canarias and CanaryFly with island-hopping flights from Tenerife and Gran Canaria, but there are flights to the main Europe cities and charter flights from mainland Europe such as Germany, United Kingdom, Scandinavia and the Netherlands. In 2018, the airport had 1,420,277 passengers in the 22,033 operations handled. Cargo traffic totalled 565 tonnes.

== History ==
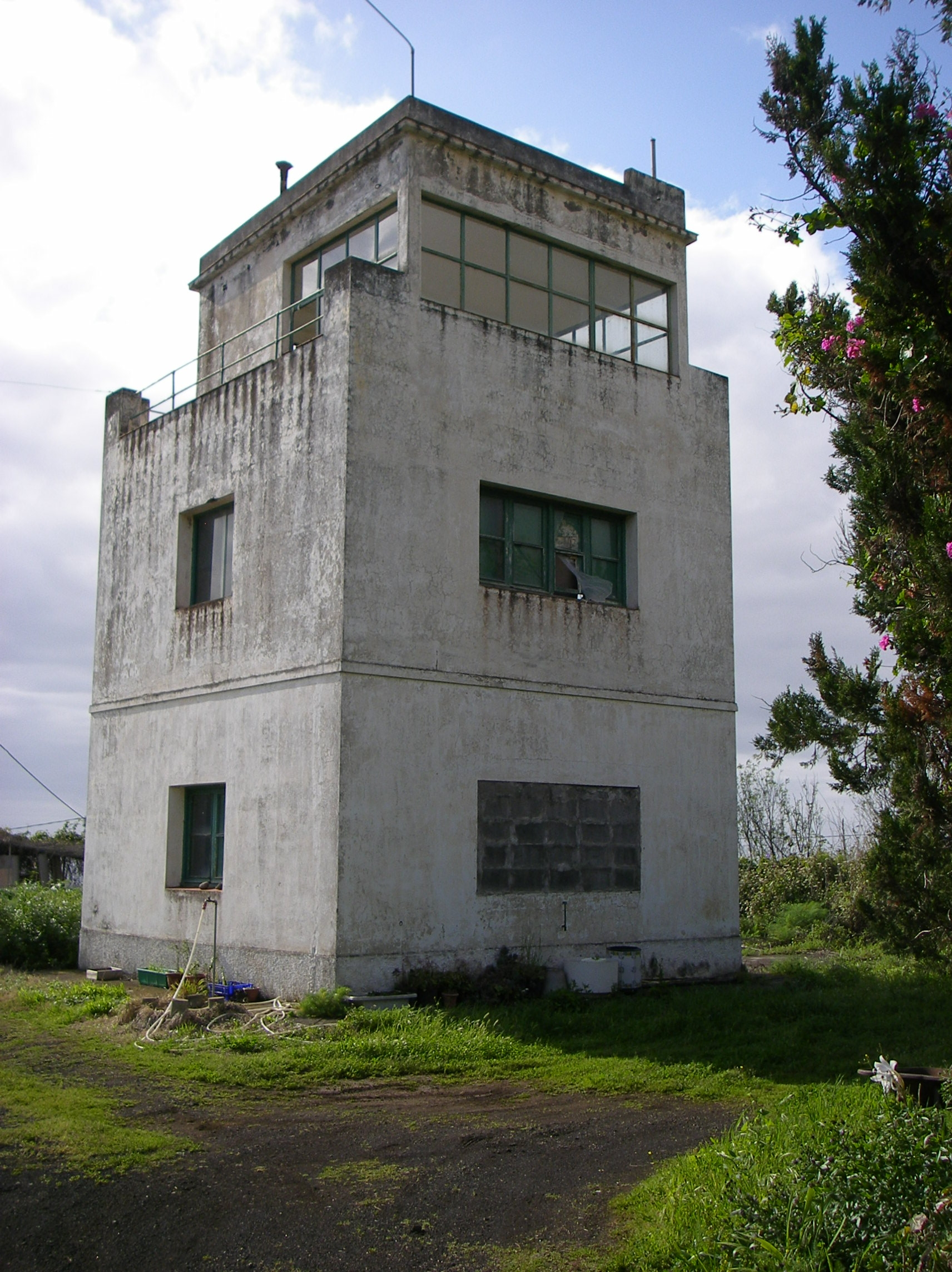
Control tower of the old airport

On 19 February 1921, the then company Marítimo Canaria received authorization from the Ministry of Transport to establish an air service on the coast of Tazacorte. In the early 1950s, plans were made for a new airfield. However, the choice of location was difficult, since the island of La Palma is very mountainous and offers little flat land near the capital. So it was decided to build the airfield called Buenavista de Arriba, also known as Buena Vista, about three kilometers west of the island's capital, Santa Cruz, at an elevation of 350 meters. This airfield was opened on 22 September 1955 for civil aviation and the first tourist flights. In 1958, the runway 03/21, about 1000 meters long, received an asphalt surface. Aircraft of the type Junkers Ju 52/3m and Douglas DC-3 operated there. The former runway and control tower as well as the airport terminal building, which has since been converted into a private house, still exist today.

As Buenavista Airport was not sustainable in the long term due to difficult wind and weather conditions, a new airport was opened near Mazo, about eight kilometers south of Santa Cruz, on 15 April 1970. Due to the large volume of traffic, the runway was later extended by about 500 meters to the north. It was completed on 1 April 1980, and has remained unchanged to this day.

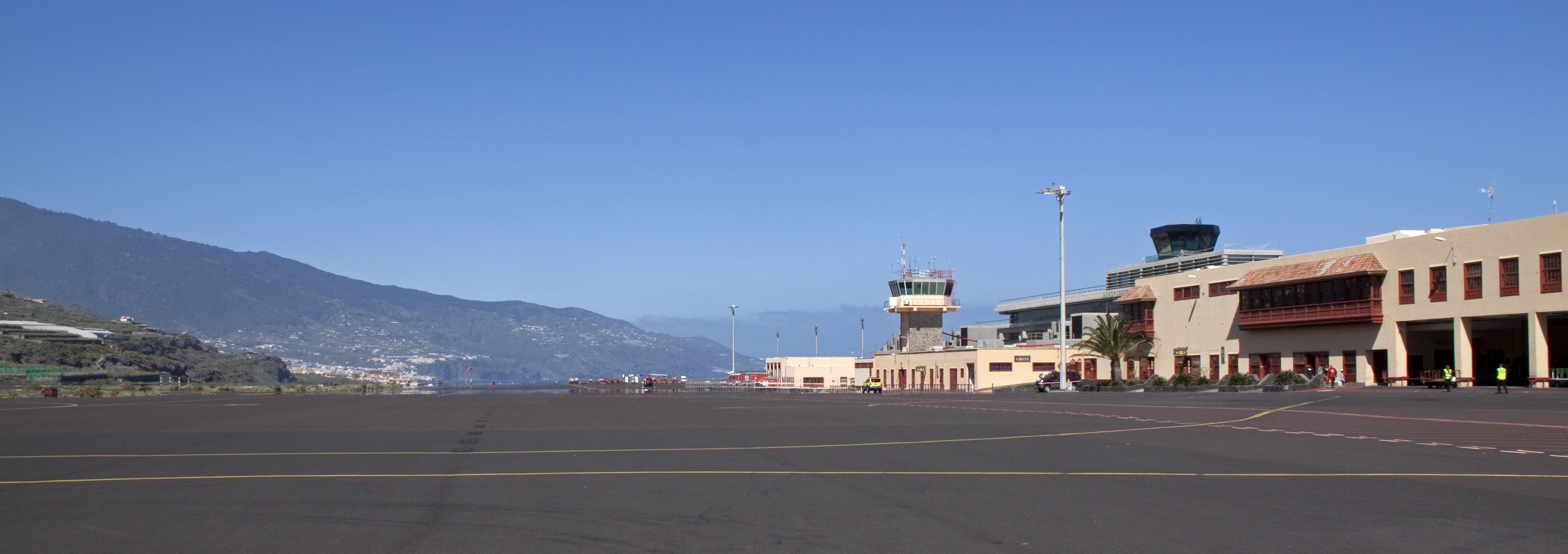
Second, now demolished airport in February 2011

However, the airport's location is also susceptible to dangerous winds - during rare westerly wind conditions, downdrafts from the mountain slopes can occur several times a year, during which air traffic has to be partially or completely shut down. In one of the longest incidents of this kind, between 6 and 10 April 2008, about three quarters of all flight movements were cancelled, and the airport had to be completely closed temporarily. Many charter flights were diverted to Tenerife South Airport. More than 1,500 passengers had to use ferry connections or stay on Tenerife or one of the other islands.

In 2021, the airport was affected by the eruption of the Cumbre Vieja volcano. Due to volcanic ash on the airport grounds, operations had to be completely shut down for a time.

== New terminal ==
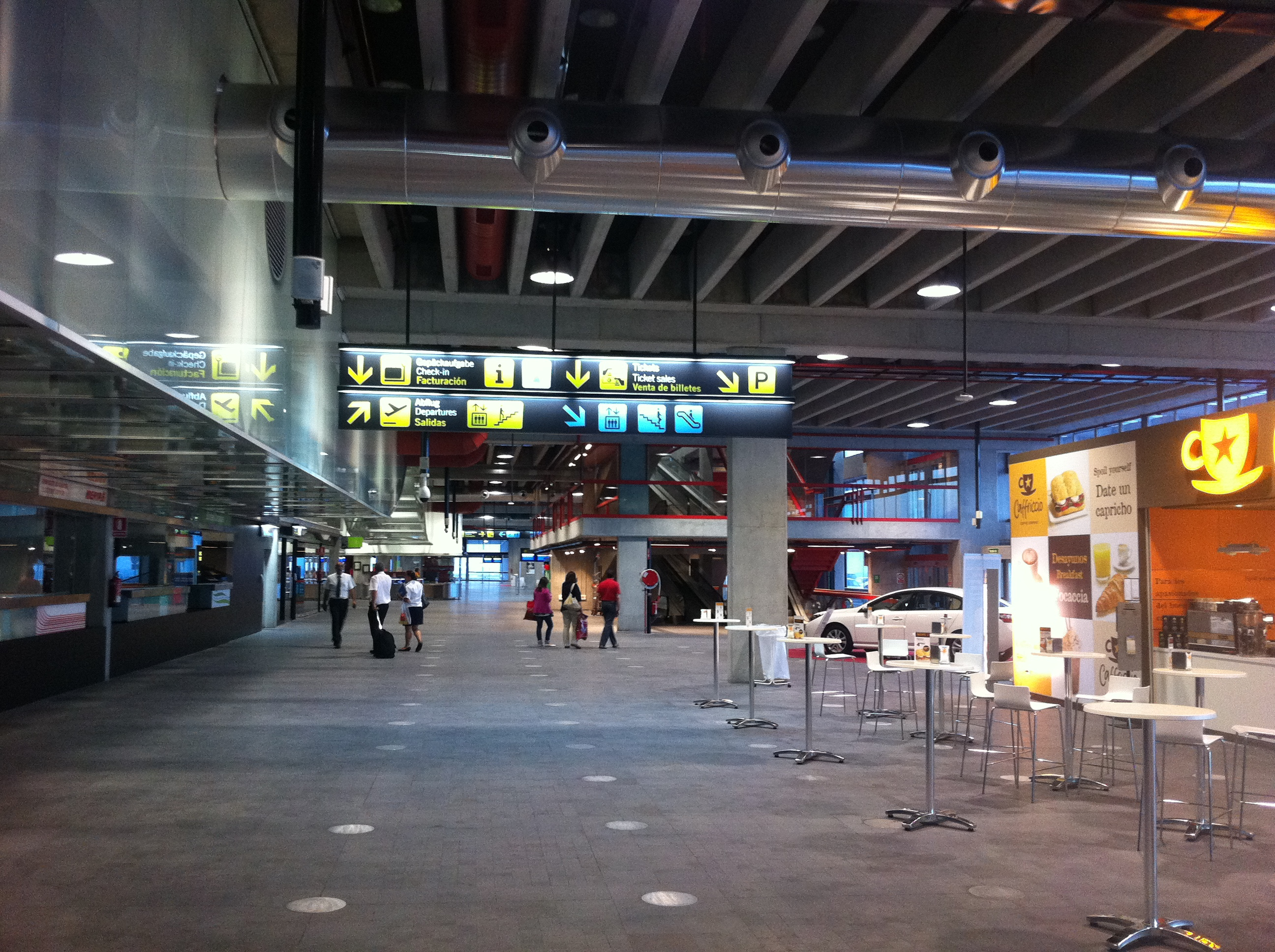
Terminal interior

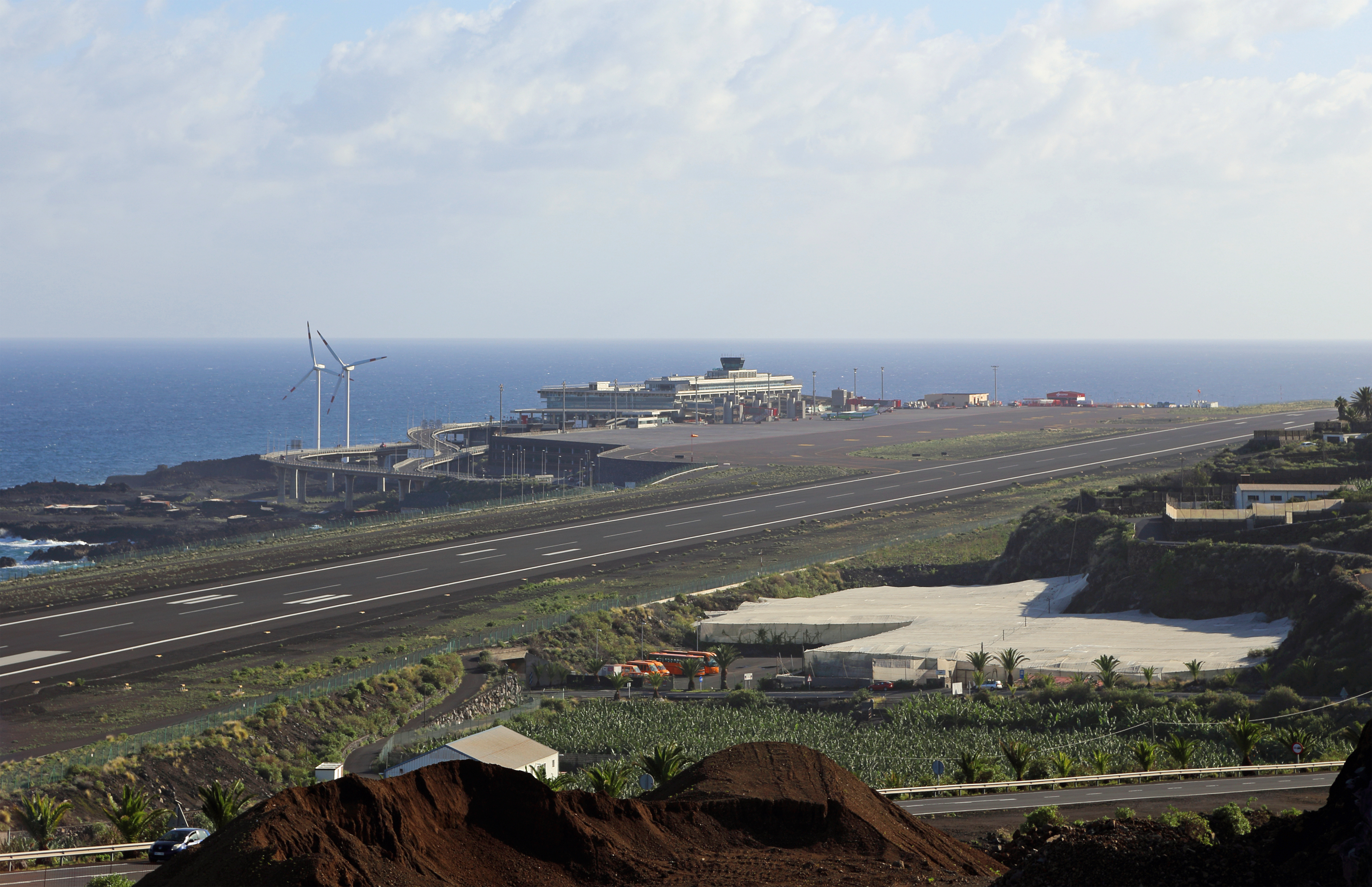
Airport overview

A new terminal building opened in July 2011, giving the airport an ultimate capacity of 3 million passengers per year. The new terminal has 25 check-in desks, 4 baggage carousels, and 9 boarding gates. The new terminal is farther back than the old terminal, meaning that apron space is maximised. There are still no plans to build a taxiway parallel to the runway, so aircraft still have to backtaxi on the runway, limiting capacity to 10 operations per hour. The airport also has a new control tower.

== Airlines and destinations ==
The following airlines operate regular scheduled and charter flights at La Palma Airport:

Airlines	Destinations
Binter Canarias	Gran Canaria, Lanzarote, Tenerife–North, Tenerife–South; Seasonal: Fuerteventura
CanaryFly	Gran Canaria, Tenerife–North
Condor	Düsseldorf, Frankfurt, Hamburg, Munich
Discover Airlines	Seasonal: Frankfurt, Munich
easyJet	Seasonal: Basel/Mulhouse, Berlin
Edelweiss Air	Seasonal: Zurich
Eurowings	Seasonal: Düsseldorf, Hamburg, Stuttgart
Iberia	Madrid; Seasonal: Málaga, Santiago de Compostela
Jet2.com	Manchester (ends 30 October 2026)
Luxair	Seasonal: Luxembourg
Marabu	Hamburg, Munich
Smartwings	Seasonal: Prague
Transavia	Amsterdam
TUI Airways	London–Gatwick, Manchester
TUI fly Netherlands	Seasonal: Amsterdam
Volotea	Seasonal: Nantes (begins 8 November 2026)
Vueling	Barcelona

== Incidents ==
The 2021 Cumbre Vieja volcanic eruption on La Palma caused the airport to temporarily shut down operations.

== Statistics ==
=== Busiest routes ===
Busiest international routes from SPC (2023)
Rank	Destination	Passengers	Change 2022/23
1	Düsseldorf	26,165	▲29%
2	Frankfurt	18,724	▼20%
3	Munich	16,663	▲38%
4	Amsterdam	16,652	▼37%
5	Hamburg	16,259	▲21%
6	London-Gatwick	16,045	▲36%
7	Billund	10,280	▲109%
8	Copenhagen	9,058	▲160%
9	Stuttgart	8,715	▲43%
10	Manchester	7,109	▼41%
Source: Estadísticas de tráfico aereo

Busiest Spanish routes from SPC (2023)
Rank	Destination	Passengers	Change 2022/23
1	Tenerife-North	688,879	▲9%
2	Gran Canaria	228,790	▲8%
3	Madrid	179,014	▼4%
4	Tenerife-South	53,392	▲110%
5	Barcelona	17,974	▼58%
6	Lanzarote	17,030	▲32%
7	Bilbao	8,640	▲55%
8	Fuerteventura	5,872	▼5%
9	Santiago de Compostela	1,254	▼92%
10	Málaga	1,115	New Route
Source: Estadísticas de tráfico aereo
