= Icod de los Vinos =

- Municipality
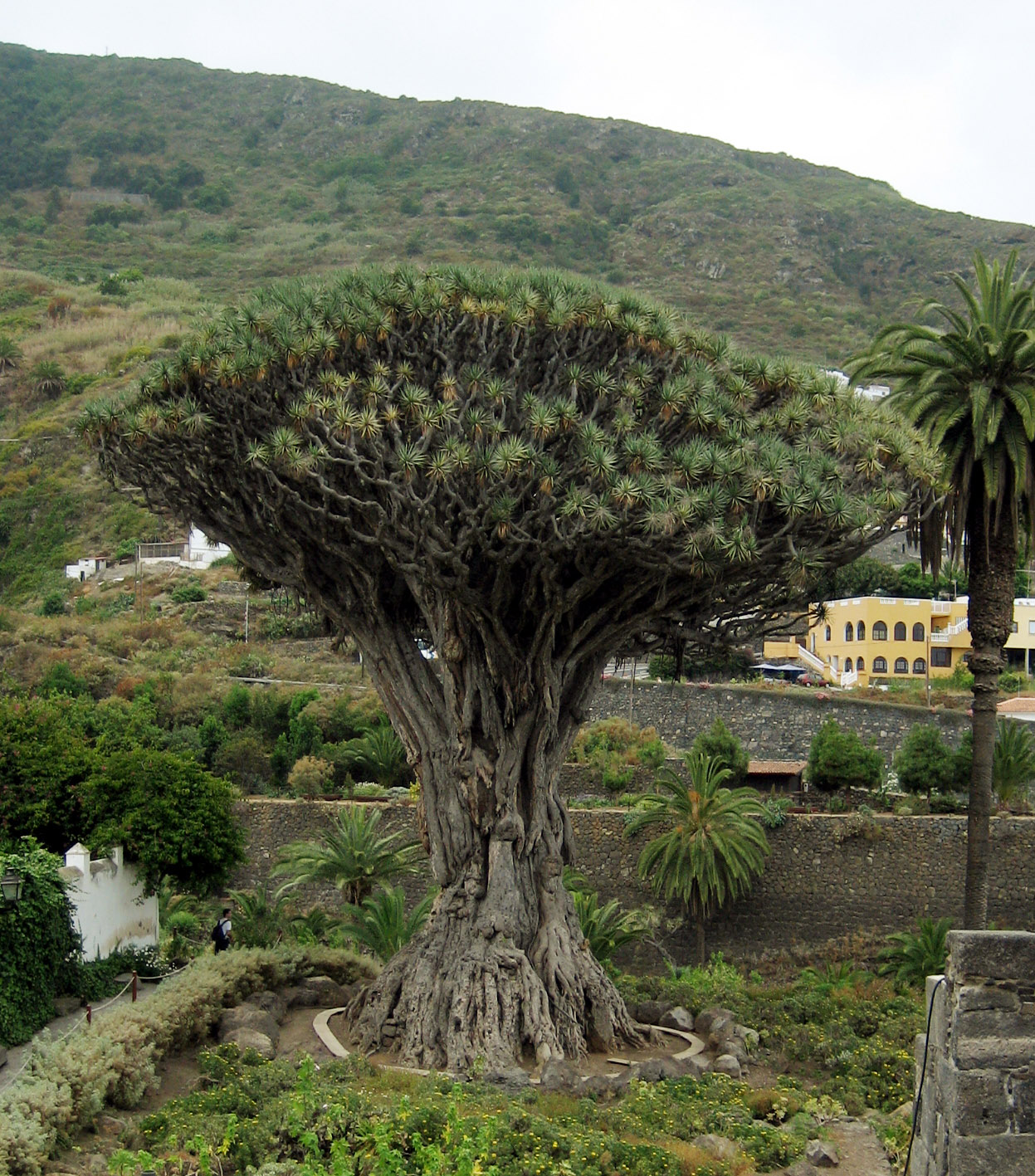
- El Drago Milenario

- Flag Coat of arms

- Municipal location in Tenerife

- Location in Tenerife Icod de los Vinos (Canary Islands) Icod de los Vinos (Spain, Canary Islands)
- Coordinates: 28°21′N 16°42′W
- Country: Spain
- Autonomous Community: Canary Islands
- Province: Santa Cruz de Tenerife
- Island: Tenerife

Government
  - Mayor: Francisco Javier González

Area
  - Total: 95.9 km^{2} (37.0 sq mi)
- Elevation (AMSL): 235 m (771 ft)

Population (2025-01-01)
  - Total: 24,616
  - Density: 257/km^{2} (665/sq mi)
- Time zone: UTC±0 (WET)
  - Summer (DST): UTC+1 (WEST)
- Postal code: 38430
- Area code: +34 (Spain) + 922 (Tenerife)
- Climate: BSh
- Website: www.icoddelosvinos.es

Icod de los Vinos is a municipality in the province of Santa Cruz de Tenerife on the island of Tenerife, in the Canary Islands (Spain), located in the northwestern part of the island. Inhabitants of Icod are known in Spanish as "icodenses".

Icod has an area of 95.90 square kilometres (37.03 sq mi), is situated at an altitude of 235 metres (771 ft) above sea level, and had a population of 23,496 in 2022.

== Location ==
Icod de los Vinos is located on a continuous smooth slope that stretches from the extensive forests of Canary Island Pine down to the sea, and has almost 10 km of shoreline. The town is surrounded by fertile valley, and its streets and corners offer views of the volcanic mountain Teide, as well as dense pine forests which descend from its summit to Icod's higher-altitude districts. Its banana plantations, orchards and vineyards give rise to a lively commerce. The valley is a fertile and agriculturally rich comarca, as shown by the town's full name, Icod de los Vinos (Icod of the Wines).

Icod de los Vinos is located about 47 km west of the capital, Santa Cruz de Tenerife.

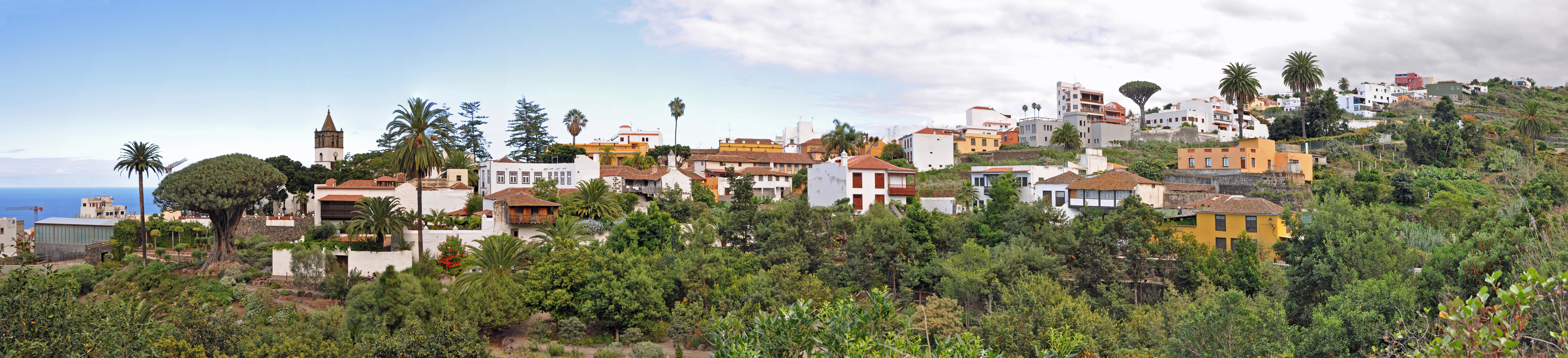
General view of Icod de los Vinos, with the bell tower of the San Marcos church and the famous dragon tree on the left

== Historical population ==
Year	Population
1991	21,455
1996	21,364
2001	21,748
2002	21,803
2003	22,358
2004	24,023
2013	23,092
2014	22,913
2015	22,659
2016	22,606
2017	22,558
2018	22,749
2019	23,254
2020	23,316
2021	23,310
2022	23,496

== History ==
Founded in 1501, the town is a collection of seigniorial houses, ancient palaces, churches and convents.

The name comes from the former menceyato of Icoden, together with a reference to the local wine (vino in Spanish). The Spanish conquerors were quick to colonize this fertile and well-watered region, and introduced the cultivation of sugarcane and grapevines; the latter came to predominate.

== Monuments and places of interest ==
In the Plaza de Lorenzo Cáceres stands the monument to General José Antonio Páez, founder of Venezuela's independence, whose great-grandfather came from Icod. The town's neighborhoods are sprinkled with innumerable hermitages and other buildings that give Icod great symbolic and artistic value, which can be appreciated at the Museo de Arte Sacro in the church of San Marcos.

=== Ancient Dragon Tree ===
In Parque del Drago, close to the Church of San Marcos, stands a famous dragon tree (22 m high, lower trunk diameter 10 m, estimated weight 70 t), which is reputed to be a thousand years old (hence its local name, El Drago Milenario: the Thousand-Year-Old Dragon). While no study seems to have confirmed such longevity for the tree (dracos do not produce annual rings with which to tell their ages; the tree is more likely to have an age in the hundreds of years), it is the long-time symbol of Icod.

After an abortive attempt by the town council in 2002, another bid to list the Icod Dragon Tree as a UNESCO World Heritage Site was made in 2011.

=== Church of San Marcos ===
The Church of San Marcos (St. Mark) is located on the Plaza de Lorenzo Cáceres, the spot where, according to tradition, the Guanches already venerated the saint's icon - una pequeña talla gótica-flamenca - before the conquest.

=== Plaza de La Pila ===
The Plaza de La Pila, near the Parque del Drago, is bordered by grand old homes, among which the Casa de los Cáceres (house of the Cáceres family), now a museum, is distinctive. The plaza itself has a small botanic garden.

=== Plaza de Lorenzo Cáceres ===
The Plaza de Lorenzo Cáceres with its varied vegetation is located in the environment of the Parque del Drago. This is also the location of the parish church of San Marcos, a Canary-Islands-style church built in the first half of the 16th century. The church has five naves, three of them separated by columns, and two of them having side chapels. Worth seeing on the church's exterior are the stone bell tower and facade. In the interior are kept important images, as well as valuable sculptures; among those that stand out are the statues of St. Mark the Evangelist and Our Lady of the Kings, in late Gothic style, and interesting paintings, including one of the Annunciation.

=== Playa de San Marcos ===
This sheltered bay on the north coast of Tenerife takes its name from the image of St. Mark the Evangelist venerated in the parish church of Icod which bears his name. This is the same image which appeared in a cave near the seashore during the conquest of the island. Several historians, including Licentiate Juan Nuñez de la Peña, mention its strange and mysterious discovery.

The safety provided by this harbor, protected against almost all winds, sheltered by its high encircling cliffs, having good anchorages and a beach, has led navigators ever since the conquest of Tenerife to choose it as a refuge in stormy weather. These advantageous conditions, and the proximity of the rich pine woods which Icod then had in much greater abundance than today, promoted the timber trade and the fabrication of ships. Many galleons and frigates were built in its shipyards for the service of the King of Spain.

Don Luis de la Cueva y Benavides, Governor-General of the Canary Islands and President of their Royal Audiencia, chose this sheltered harbor for the construction of the frigates he had undertaken for the Royal Armada, and for this reason the people who stayed in this place while the ships were being built, including many naval carpenters and caulkers, came to Icod. Timbers were cut in the forest which then existed in the vicinity of the Ermita del Amparo, a place which still records this fact in the name of Corte de Naos (place where wood was cut for ships) which it retains.

The soldiers of the three companies of militia which were then stationed in Icod assisted with great willingness and care, during the construction of the frigates, in everything they were instructed to do by the persons who directed them, and everyone who lived nearby gave up their beds to give comfortable accommodations to the soldiers and workmen Don Luis de la Cueva had brought with him.

The Governor-General was so pleased with the comportment of the militiamen in Icod that before he left, on November 30, 1601, he issued a letter of praise through his scribe, Juan Nuñez de Cain y Zaraza. The letter granted them privileged exemption from forced lodging, participation in night vigils or contributions to them, and exemption from personal service. Furthermore, he ordered that his lieutenants, militia leaders, captains and all other military officers should not compel their men to go to other towns for military parades, but rather that others should come to Icod to perform them. Only when other garrisons were on alert would they have to travel to attend them.

Those were times of constant alarm and fear for the inhabitants of the Canary Islands, because of the frequent appearance of pirates and corsairs in Canarian waters, and every town lived on a war footing to forestall their surprises and excesses. The inhabitants of Icod, attentive to its defense, kept an arsenal of 500 muskets and a reserve of gunpowder in a strategic and secret location. But since the chief danger was at Puerto de San Marcos, even though the latter had been fortified by nature, a strong wall was constructed on the beach, to make the place more accessible to disembarkation, and a watchtower was built on a prominent place in the town, from which its watchmen, which commanded a wider view of the sea than those on the coast, constantly surveyed the horizon.

Today the Playa de San Marcos, protected by shell-shaped cliffs and covered with the black sand characteristic of northern Tenerife, is a place of recreation.

=== Cueva del Viento ===
Thought to be the largest volcanic cave in the world, the Cueva del Viento (Cave of the Wind) has a known length of over 17 kilometers. It consists of a complex lava tube with several entrances, is the largest lava tube in the European Union. It presents great internal complexity, a wide variety of geomorphological structures, and a unique fauna, both living and fossilized. Other caves, also very extensive, are found in other nooks of the town: these include San Marcos, Punto Blanco, El Rey, and Felipe Reventón.

=== Casa de Los Cáceres ===
This was formerly the residence of Lorenzo Cáceres, a colonel of engineers. Its three-story neoclassical facade presents traditional quartered windows; a high arched central gate with a stone frame, cornice, and balustrade; this gate between large flowerpots; and a pretty hidden balcony sporting turned balusters in the main window.

=== Icod Public Library ===
The Icod Public Library has returned to its original venue. The new installations in which it is housed now can—and should—transform it into one of the best bibliographic and cultural centers of reference on the Islands. Today, the library has three branches.

- The Central Library is still situated in the San Francisco convent, and already contains close to 13,200 volumes.
- The Library of the Institute of Lucas Martín Espino (11,000 volumes)
- The Santa Barbara Library (2,500 volumes, specialized in children's literature)

With an openly creative purpose, the library publishes a literary collection of Canary art and publications. These short notebooks were created in order to offer visitors some of the most exceptional artistic, literary, and written prospects of the Canary Islands specifically, and Spain generally. Titled Trama interior (The Interior Plot), the documents reunite three young Canary painters: Cristina Gámez, Eva Ibarria and Rosa Rodríguez.

== Folklore and Customs ==
=== Tablas de San Andrés ===
On 29 November each year, the eve of San Andrés’ day and the official festival of new wine, the storehouses open for all to taste the juice of the year's harvest, accompanied by roasted chestnuts. This festival, rooted among Icod's citizens, involves sliding on "tablas" or boards (originally by torchlight [?]) down the sloping neighborhood streets. The spectacle of the party is seen in Plano street, where these boards are seen speeding along, steered by riders.

This tradition was born from the need to transport wood from the highest zones of the municipality down to the workshops where it was used in handicrafts and in naval construction. The wood traveled down El Amparo street (then unpaved) on the back of a large board or plank, while "oars" of heather or fayatree (Myrica faya) branches were used to brake and steer, thus avoiding the endless obstacles that might be in the way. Nowadays other types of "boards" are used—metal, plastic, automotive suspensions [?], etc. -- which leave the practice dull and far-removed from the origin of the San Andrés boards. Every year the municipal authorities call for an end to these different variations in an effort to preserve the tradition of the "tablas". Many visitors come from other parts of the island to see the annual festival, as do tourists.

=== Los Hachitos ===
Los Hachitos (literally, "the little torches") is a holiday of pagan origin, a remnant of a summer solstice fire cult that has remained well established, and its celebration never forgotten. Today, this parade takes place in Icod de los Vinos from San Marcos to El Amparo, passing through Las Charnecas and El Lomo de Las Canales. It is possible that the parade route approaches the sea in anticipation of the coming of the sun. To the son rhythm of the tajaraste drums, los hachitos come out during the festival of San Juan Bautista on 23 June. They are made of rags soaked in petroleum and placed in the high areas of the town, forming pictures out of light (stars, hearts, crosses, and so on), or are thrown down the mountain to evoke a lava flow. Others are decorated with branches, flowers and ribbons and carried up the mountain, giving rise to a magical, multicolored spectacle.

=== El Diablo y La Diabla ===
This is a tradition that was frequent in the neighborhoods and settlements in the time of Corpus Christi. In this they represented the fight of the forces of hell against the archangel Saint Michael. The male and female devils (el diablo y la diabla) left accompanied by their court of giants and dwarves, which amused the town with the rhythm of the tajaraste. This custom was prohibited, it being said that it only invited disorder and the distraction of religious devotion. But this custom continues to be practiced, evidence of this being that today el diablo y la diabla continue leaving in the middle of September through the neighborhood of Las Angustias (The Anguishes) in honor of the Virgin.

=== Los Guanches de La Candelaria ===
In the zone known as La Candelaria, each August 15, the Virgin is put on procession, where townsfolk dressed like Guanches stage the first encounter of the Guanches with the Virgin. After this unique performance, the spectators accompany the procession to an area where they are honored with a shower of artificial fireworks.

=== The Pilgrimage of the Poleo ===
In El Amparo, with the holiday of the patron saint, there is a pilgrimage to the rhythm of the "tajaraste," which consists of going to the mountain to collect the branch and the poleo to adorn the neighborhood during the festival days. In these festivals, at the beginning of August, the decoration of the better half of the church has always had a special character. The adornment of the main door, called "bollo" is an enormous sponge cake, coated with small sugar figurines, the "alfeñiques", all adorned with many colored ribbons. The rest of the arch is adorned with palm, poleo, etc... and some baskets of fruit which hang from the roof. Finally, in the corners of the roof, hang the "madamas", large bread figures, adorned with bows and dressed very colorfully.

=== Baskets and Pastries of Santa Bárbara ===
In August, in honor of its patron, St. Barbara, the characteristic fair of baskets and pastries is celebrated. This popular rite is typified by its offering, based on garden produce. The baskets are decorated with fruits and vegetables that are placed in the plaza, in the portico of the church, in order to give a colorful and dynamic aspect to the festivities with these spectacular artisanal works. The pastries are nothing more than figurines made out of sugar in the shape of animals, and adorned with multicolored ribbons by the artisans of the neighborhood. These singular figures are carried on the heads of the single women and matchmakers of the neighborhood to place them among the baskets in the church portico, as an offering and homage to the saint.

== Icod Cuisine ==
The gastronomy of Icod de los Vinos is unique; some dishes can only be made locally, as they require indigenous ingredients that can only be found in the Canary Islands. In fact, Canarian cuisine is eclectic, due to the Islands having been a port of call for centuries. Its most characteristic features include los mojos, or sauces (mojo verde, made from cilantro, and mojo picón, a spicy sauce, are the most common) that serve as the preferred accompaniment to fish of great texture and flavor, such as bogas, samas, salemas, chernes, and the famous vieja ("old woman"). Papas arrugadas ("wrinkled potatoes") , potatoes cooked in salted water and served in their skins: Of all their varieties, the "black" is considered to be best. Icod is also home to a varied assortment of confections; bienmesabe, arroz a la miel (honeyed rice), piononos (stuffed fried plantains), leche asada ("roasted milk"), quesadillas and truchas (fried, filled sweet potato pastries; lit. "trout") are some of Icod's most prized desserts.

== Heraldry ==
=== Coat of Arms of Icod de los Vinos ===
To speak of the Drago milenario (declared a National Monument in 1917) is to speak of the essence of the town's fame. It is because of this ancient example of Canary Island flora, a symbol which evokes the lively community of the hospitable northern population, that in the conduct of its festivals in honor of Christ on Calvary, the islands' feelings of patriotism and religion are given tribute. This tribute recalls the numerous glorious dates of the isles' history, so closely linked from the initial conquest that began its recorded history.

The Drago and the Teide (which symbolizes the rise of the island toward all things great and noble) figure prominently in the town's coat of arms, which was bestowed upon the town by Royal Decree on 9 November 1921. As one can see in the accompanying picture, it consists of two divided quarters. In one, the Teide appears over a field of blue; in the other, the Drago is over a field of silver. The blazon is encircled by eight clusters of golden grapes over a field of sinople (2). Four tenantes (3) symbolize the history of the island's conquest upon evoking a change of impressions between the menceyes Belicar de Icod, Rosmeu de Daute, Pelinor de Adeje, and Adjoña de Abona, with the aim of ending their valiant resistance against the Spanish troops which had already triumphed at two crucial points in the present-day areas of La Victoria de Acentejo and Los Realejos. The heraldic elements exalt the traditional courtesy and hospitality of the people of Icod; their laboriousness and extremely fertile countryside; their profound sense of patriotism and their dedication to the memory of the history uniting their two races under the auspices of Santa Cruz. As an official blazon, the coat of arms of Icod affirms and underscores all of the acts of the town. (1) CANARIAS - Magazine which is published in Villa de La Orotava. (2) Sinople - Heraldic color which in painting is represented by green, and in engraving by oblique lines which run from the cantón diestro del jefe al siniestro de la punta. It is also used as a noun. (3) Tenantes - Each one of the figures of men/angels that the shield displays.

=== The Flag of Icod de los Vinos ===
The plenary council of Icod de los Vinos unanimously resolved to adopt the first official flag of the municipality following the proposal of the Department of Culture and Heritage. In accordance with the legal autonomous community's legal requirements in respect of heraldic shields, coats of arms and banners, the flag was commissioned by the DCH to the Garachican heraldist Pascual González Regalado.

The resolution required the proceedings to be kept as public record for one month, and in order to avoid claims arising therefrom, the proceedings were remitted to the Viceconsulry of the Government of the Canary Islands for Territorial Administration so that, following the report of the Institute of Canary Island Studies, the flag could be granted official approval. Aside from technical references to specifications for material, mast, hoist, etc., the author provides the following description of the flag of Icod: three vertical stripes of equal width, those at the sides being maroon and the central stripe being white.

The flag also bears the heraldic shield of the locality, positioned in the centre with a height of two thirds that of the flag. The colours chosen by Pascual González bear a close relationship to two essential symbols of Icod de los Vinos by which they are inspired – the Canarly Islands Dragon Tree and Mount Teide. According to the author, the maroon (or purple) colour is featured on the flag "in memory of and as passionate homage to the sapling of the venerable, magnificent and exemplary millennium of the dragon tree which is found in the town. A sapling which has been the subject of wars and legends and, in ancient times, a substance used in medicine". On the other hand, the inclusion of the white symbolises "the extreme wintry whiteness displayed by Mount Teide so close to Icod, which, when viewed from the town, provides an illustration of singulararly extraordinary beauty."

Around September 2001, the official flag of Icod de los Vinos was blessed and raised amid celebrations organised by the Corporación Municipal (Municipal Corporation) in the town hall square, featuring appearances by the president of the Government of the Canary Islands (Román Rodríguez Rodríguez), the deputy of the Government (Pilar Merino), as well as the author of the flag, Pascual González Regalado.

==== Description of the flag of Icod de los Vinos ====
In accordance with the requirements of Order 123/190 of the Autonomous Community of the Canary Islands dated 29 June, which governs the approval procedure of heraldic shields, blasons and flags of the islands and municipalities of the archipelago (BOC 95 and 177), the flag of the municipality of Icod de los Vinos conforms to the following description:

The flag is to conform to a ratio of 2:3 (height to width).
The flag is to feature three equal vertical stripes, the outer stripes being maroon, and the central stripe being white.
The heraldic arms of the municipality are to be placed in the centre of the flag, and should stand at two-thirds the height of the flag.

== See also ==
- List of municipalities in Santa Cruz de Tenerife
- Hospital del Norte de Tenerife
- Museo Guanche
