= Tranvía Villasegura =

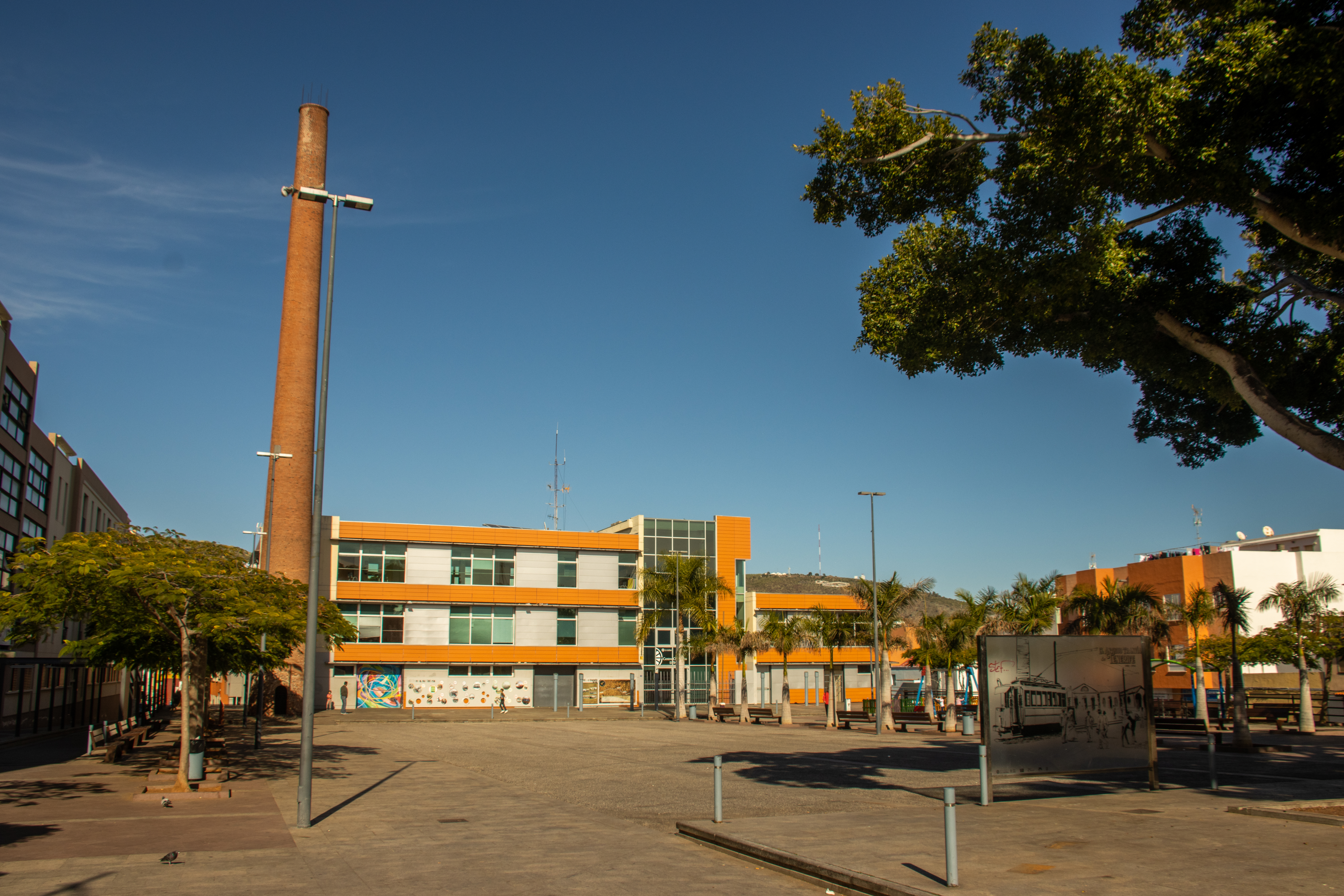
- The location of the former electricity generating station and central station of the tram system in 2020

Overview
- Locale: Tenerife, Canary Islands
- Transit type: Tram

Operation
- Began operation: 7 April 1901
- Ended operation: 26 February 1959

Tranvía Villasegura was a tramway that ran between Santa Cruz and La Laguna in Tenerife, Canary Islands. Opened in 1901, it extended to Tacoronte in 1905, and closed in 1956. A new tram system, Tranvía Tenerife, started operation along a similar route in 2007.

== Construction ==
The construction of a tram system in Tenerife was first proposed in January 1897, due to a combination of increased trade, tourism, and the expansion of railways at the time. It was approved on 12 November 1898, and was supported by the Belgium consul. Originally intended to connect Santa Cruz with Icod de los Vinos, it was designed by Julio Cervera Baviera, and the concession was given to Aleixes de Reus on 4 July 1899. The company Societe Anonyme des Tramways Electriques de Tenerife was founded in Belgium on 28 September 1899, and the construction of the system was by Belgian contractors. Construction started on 29 October 1899, with the first tracks laid in Santa Cruz in February 1900, which reached to the central station in La Cuesta on 2 August 1900. Leopold II of Belgium visited the tramway in 1900. The line opened on 7 April 1901. The manager of the 'Electrico' system was Nicolas Marti Dehesa. The system was named Tranvía Villasegura after Imeldo Serís, Marquis de Villasegura, who obtained the concessions to enable the construction of the tramway.

The system was electric-powered, with each tram having two 50 horsepower motors. The generating system was located in La Cuesta, and was open to public viewing. It had two direct action engines that drove the dynamos, and provided up to 200KW of power, with Green economizers and Tudor batteries, with a Koerting tubular refrigerator to cool condensing water. The garages and the office were co-located with the generating system.

An extension to Tacoronte was proposed in December 1900, and approved on 18 April 1904. Construction work started in April 1904, the inauguration was on 27 July 1904 (with Leopold II of Belgium present), and the tramline opened in 1905. A further extension to Orotava was proposed in 1905, but not constructed.

New tramcars arrived from Belgium in 1912. The Cabildo de Tenerife took over operation of the tramway on 12 April 1927, in order to upgrade the system and repair wear-and-tear, and additional tramcars arrived between 1931 and 1940.

== Route ==
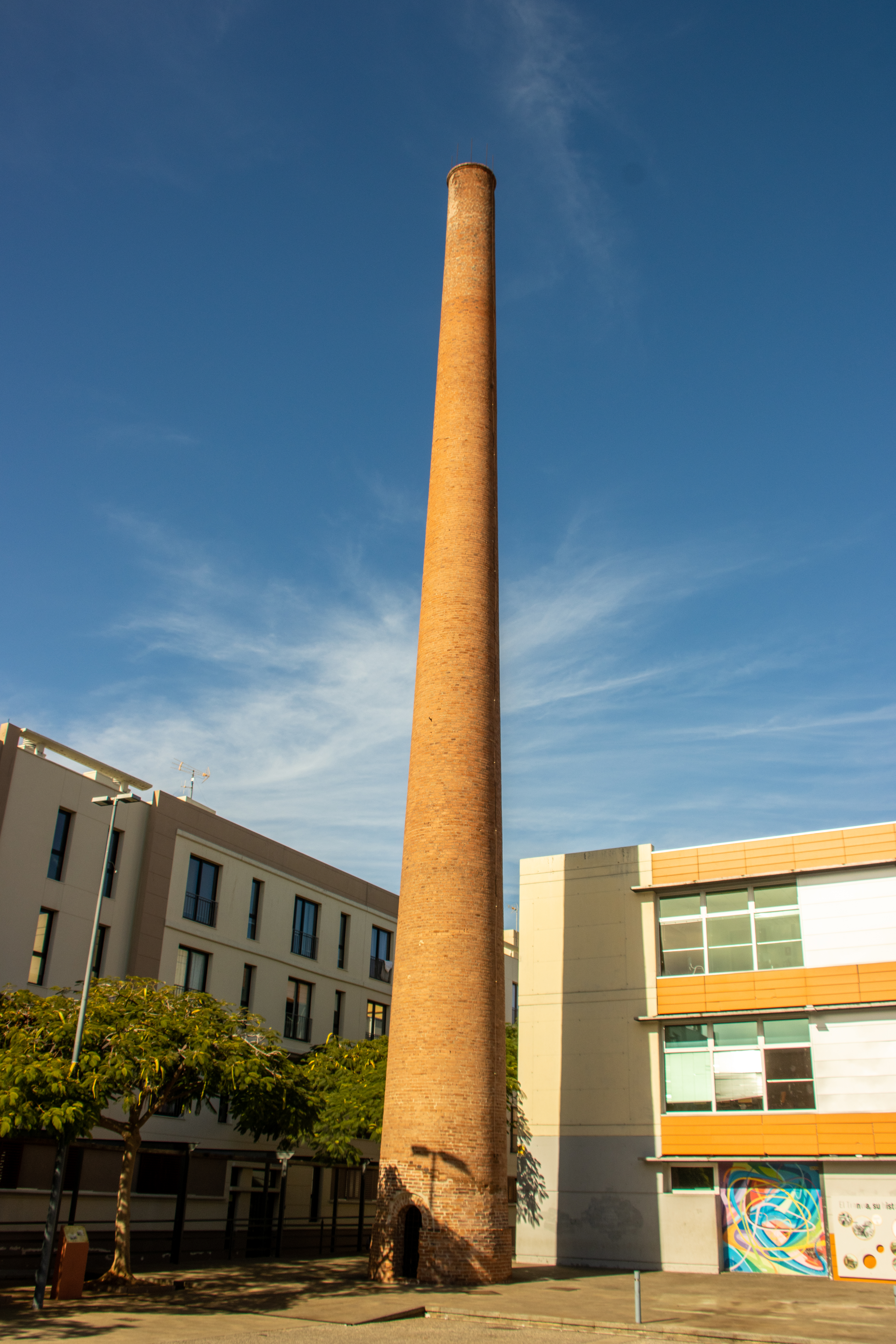
The old chimney from the electrical generating station in 2020

The system started at the port of Santa Cruz, and ran to Tacoronte via La Laguna. The central station was in La Cuesta. The journey from Santa Cruz to La Laguna was 11 kilometres (6.8 mi) long, cost 1.45 pesos, took 45 minutes, and the system ran hourly. The route to Tacoronte took 1.5 hours, cost 2.80 pesos, and covered 20 kilometres (12 mi), running every other hour. The tramway also took luggage, and it was possible to charter a special luggage car if needed.

Alfonso XIII of Spain visited the tramway in 1906. It appeared in the publicity film 'Summertime in Tenerife' in 1956.

On the evening of 1 September 1934, tram number 15 was stopped and robbed of 600 pesetas, before tram number 13 arrived and the robbers opened fire, killing the driver of tram 13, Luis García-Panasco, and a high school student, Agustín Bernal, who was a passenger on tram 15. Five people were later arrested, convicted, and jailed.

On 15 September 1953, the newest tram in service, number 16, crashed. Traveling downhill towards Santa Cruz during rain, the tram lost traction and started accelerating, with the brakes unable to stop it. It derailed around the Romero Curve and overturned, killing the driver, and injuring 15 passengers.

== Decline ==
The tramway was most used before WWI. In parallel with tram systems in other countries, competition from road vehicles caused its decline, and the system became increasingly out of date and expensive to maintain. Suggestions of replacing it with a more flexible trolleybus system started around 1936, and became more formal in 1953. The tramway services were suspended on 15 November 1956, and the final substitution for trolleybuses took place on 26 February 1959.

== Remains ==
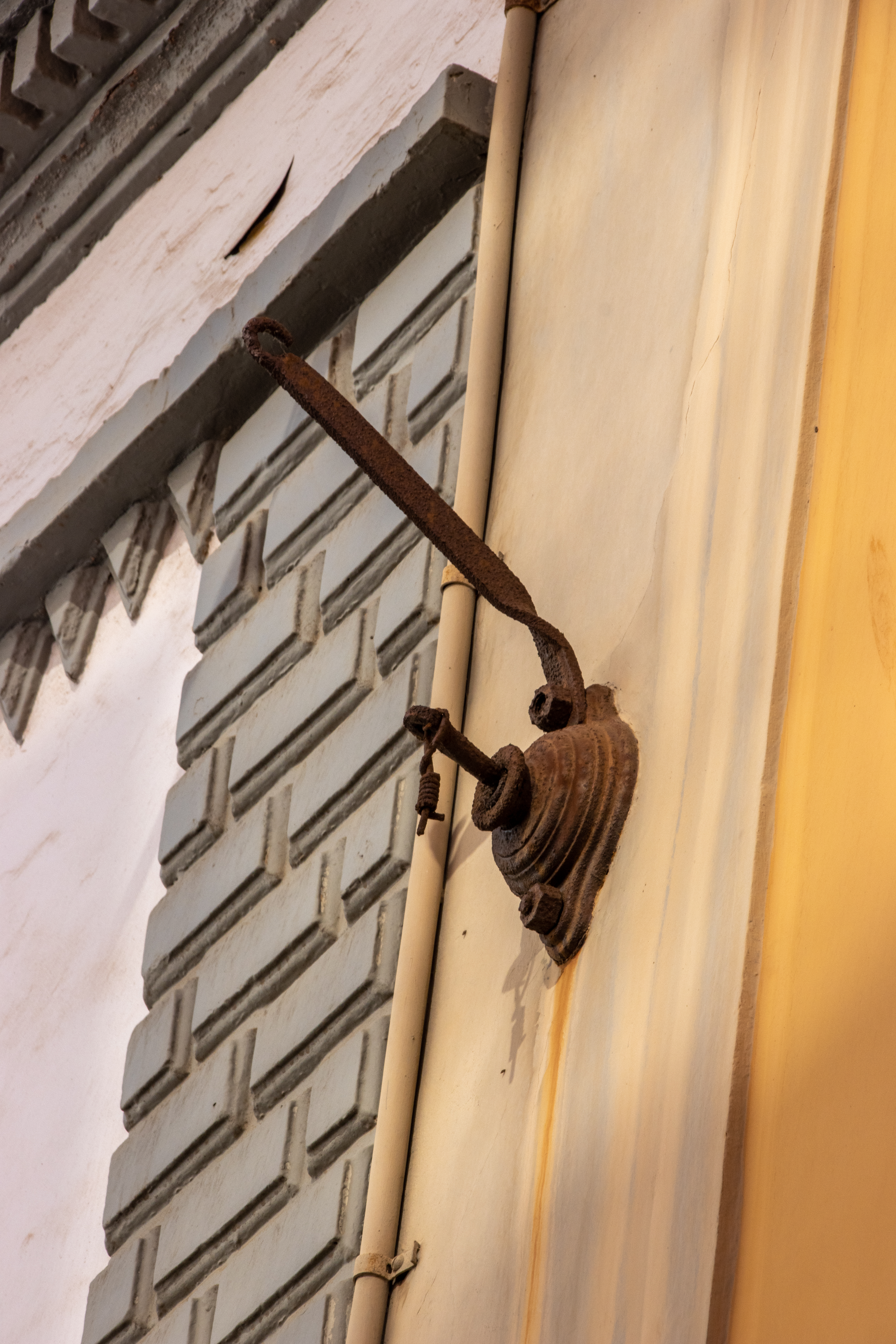
A remaining support for overhead wires in La Laguna

Nearly all of the tramway was scrapped after closure, with the parts sold off in auction lots. The money raised from the auctions was used in the construction of the Hospital Universitario de Canarias.

Only the 35 m (115 ft) tall red brick chimney from the electricity generating station remains in La Cuesta, at Plaza el Tranvia, close to the La Cuesta station on the new tramway, which opened in 2007 and takes a different route from the original one. Some supports for the overhead wires remain on some streets in Santa Cruz and La Laguna, and one support post is preserved in Plaza de La Concepción in La Laguna.

Tram number 8 was purchased at auction by Don Alberto Bichara and Julio Roble in 1965 for 100,000 pesetas, and moved to a nearby location called "Pozo Cabildo", where it was operated as a bar called "Tranvía Club 8" from 1966, before being sold in 1970 to become a bar named "Le Wagon"; several proposals were submitted to relocate it to a central location in Santa Cruz, however ultimately the tram was sold for scrap after a fire in the 1980s.

In 2013, a book in Spanish was published on "The old tramway of Tenerife" (Spanish: El antiguo tranvía de Tenerife) by Rafael Cedrés Jorge.
