= Hospital del Sur de Tenerife =

Geography
- Location: Arona, Tenerife, Spain
- Coordinates: 28.06859°N 16.70524°W

Organisation
- Affiliated university: Servicio Canario de Salud

Services
- Beds: 96

History
- Opened: 2015

Links
- Lists: Hospitals in Spain
- Other links: List of hospitals in Spain

The Hospital del Sur de Tenerife (in English: Hospital of the South of Tenerife) is located in the municipality of Arona, in the south of the island of Tenerife (Canary Islands, Spain).

It was opened in 2015. The Hospital del Sur de Tenerife is, together with its counterpart the Hospital del Norte de Tenerife, the main health centers in the island of Tenerife after the third level hospitals: the Hospital Universitario Nuestra Señora de Candelaria (in Santa Cruz de Tenerife) and the Hospital Universitario de Canarias (in San Cristóbal de La Laguna). It is a center with coverage for the municipalities of the south of the island of Tenerife.

The Hospital of the South of Tenerife has, according to its classification as a second level hospital, with services of hospitalization, advanced diagnosis, emergencies, major ambulatory surgery, rehabilitation, etc.

== See also ==
- Hospital del Norte de Tenerife
