= Hospital del Norte de Tenerife =

Geography
- Location: Icod de los Vinos, Tenerife, Spain
- Coordinates: 28.38485°N 16.68455°W

Organisation
- Affiliated university: Servicio Canario de Salud

Services
- Beds: 50

History
- Opened: 2012

Links
- Lists: Hospitals in Spain
- Other links: List of hospitals in Spain

The Hospital del Norte de Tenerife (in English: Hospital of the North of Tenerife) is located in the municipality of Icod de los Vinos, in the north of the island of Tenerife (Canary Islands, Spain).

It was opened in 2012. The Hospital del Norte de Tenerife is, together with its counterpart the Hospital del Sur de Tenerife, the main health centers in the island of Tenerife after the third level hospitals: the Hospital Universitario Nuestra Señora de Candelaria (in Santa Cruz de Tenerife) and the Hospital Universitario de Canarias (in San Cristóbal de La Laguna). It is a center with coverage for the municipalities of the north of the island of Tenerife.

The hospital has, according to its classification as a hospital of second level, with services of hospitalization, advanced diagnosis, emergencies, major ambulatory surgery, rehabilitation, cardiology, surgery, digestive, endocrinology, gynecology, obstetrics, pneumology, rheumatology, traumatology, angiology and vascular surgery, dermatology, neurology, ophthalmology, otorhinolaryngology, rehabilitation and urology, etc.

== See also ==
- Hospital del Sur de Tenerife
