= List of hospitals in Spain =

Map of Autonomous Communities

This is a list of hospitals in Spain.

== Andalusia ==
=== Cádiz ===
- Hospital La Línea de la Concepción, La Línea de la Concepción
- Hospital Naval de San Carlos (Military)
- Hospital of Jerez de la Frontera, Jerez de la Frontera
- Hospital of Puerto Real
- Hospital Puerta del Mar, Cádiz
- Hospital Punta de Europa, Algeciras
- Hospital Santa María del Puerto, El Puerto de Santa María

=== Córdoba ===
- Hospital Cruz Roja Córdoba
- Hospital de Montilla, Montilla
- Hospital de Puente Genil, Puente Genil
- Hospital Infanta Margarita, Cabra
- Hospital La Arruzafa
- Hospital San Juan de Dios de Córdoba
- Hospital Universitario Reina Sofia:
  - Hospital General
  - Hospital Los Morales
  - Hospital Materno-Infantil
  - Hospital Provincial
- Hospital Valle de los Pedroches, Pozoblanco
- Hospital Valle del Guadiato, Peñarroya-Pueblonuevo

=== Jaén ===
- Hospital Alto Guadalquivir, Andújar
- Hospital Doctor Sagaz
- Hospital General San Agustín, Linares
- Hospital San Juan de la Cruz, Úbeda
- Hospital Universitario Neurotraumatológico
- Hospital Universitario Princesa de España

=== Málaga ===
- C.P.E., Marbella
- Hospital Axarquía, Vélez-Málaga
- Hospital Carlos Haya, Málaga
- Hospital Costa Del Sol, Marbella
- Hospital De Alta Resolución De Benalmádena, Benalmádena
- Hospital De Antequera, Antequera
- Hospital Marbella USP, Marbella
- Hospital Marítimo, Torremolinos
- Hospital Materno-Infantil, Málaga
- Hospital Serranía, Ronda
- Hospital Virgen De La Victoria (Clínico) Málaga

=== Seville ===
- Hospital de la Caridad
- Hospital El Tomillar international
- Hospital Provincial de San Lazaro
- Hospital Provincial de San Lázaro
- Hospital San Juan de Dios
- Hospital Universitario Virgen de Valme
- Hospital Universitario Virgen del Rocío
- Hospital Universitario Virgen Macarena
- Hospital Victoria Eugenia aka de la Cruz Roja

=== Granada ===
- San Juan de Dios Hospital (Granada)

== Aragon ==
=== Saragossa ===
- Hospital Clínico Universitario Lozano Blesa
- Hospital Quirón Zaragoza
- Hospital Real y General de Nuestra Señora de Gracia
- Hospital Royo Villanova
- Hospital Universitario Miguel Servet de Zaragoza

== Principality of Asturias ==
- Hospital Universitario Central de Asturias (Oviedo)
- Hopital Monte Naranco (Oviedo)
- Hospital Comarcal de Jarrio (Coaña)
- Hospital Carmen y Severo Ochoa (Cangas del Narcea)
- Hospital de Cabueñes (Gijón)
- Hospital de Jove (Gijón)
- Hospital de la Cruz Roja de Gijón (Red Cross, Gijón)
- Hospital de San Agustín (Avilés)
- Fundación Hospital de Avilés (Avilés)
- Hospital del Oriente de Asturias (Arriondas)
- Hospital Valle del Nalón (Langreo)
- Sanatorio Adaro (Langreo)
- Hospital Vital Álvarez Buylla (Mieres)

== Balearic Islands ==
- Fundación Hospital de Manacor -ManacorMallorca
- Hospital Can Misses -Ibiza
- Hospital Comarcal de Inca -Inca Mallorca
- Hospital de Formentera-Formentera
- Hospital Mateu Orfila -Mahón Menorca
- Hospital Son Llatzer -Palma de Mallorca
- Hospital Universitari Son Espases- Palma de Mallorca

== Basque Country ==
- Hospital Alto Deba - Debagoiena Ospitalea - Zumarraga
- Hospital Bidasoa Ospitalea - Irun
- Hospital de Basurto - Basurtuko Ospitalea - Bilbao
- Hospital de Cruces - Gurutzetako Ospitalea - Barakaldo
- Hospital de Leza - Lezako Ospitalea - Leza
- Hospital Donostia Ospitalea - San Sebastián
- Hospital Galdakao Ospitalea - Galdakao
- Hospital Gorliz Ospitalea - Gorliz
- Hospital Mendaro Ospitalea - Mendaro
- Hospital Quirón Bizkaia (Private) - Biscay
- Hospital San Eloy Ospitalea - Barakaldo
- Hospital Santa Marina Ospitalea - Bilbao
- Hospital Universitario Araba - Arabako Ospitale Unibertsitarioa - Vitoria-Gasteiz
- Hospital Urduliz Ospitalea - Urduliz

== Canary Islands ==
- Hospital del Norte de Tenerife - Tenerife
- Hospital del Sur de Tenerife - Tenerife
- Hospital General de Fuerteventura - Fuerteventura
- Hospital General de La Palma - La Palma
- Hospital General de Lanzarote Dr. José Molina Orosa - Lanzarote
- Hospital Nuestra Señora de Guadalupe - La Gomera
- Hospital Nuestra Señora de los Reyes - El Hierro
- Hospital Universitario de Canarias - Tenerife
- Hospital Universitario de Gran Canaria Doctor Negrín - Gran Canaria
- Hospital Universitario Insular de Gran Canaria - Gran Canaria
- Hospital Universitario Nuestra Señora de Candelaria - Tenerife

== Cantabria ==
- Centro Hospitalario Padre Menni - Santander
- Hospital Comarcal de Laredo - Laredo
- Hospital Santa Clotilde - Santander
- Hospital Sierrallana- Torrelavega
- Marqués de Valdecilla University Hospital, Santander

== Castile-La Mancha ==
- Hospital de Albacete - Albacete
- Hospital General "La Mancha Centro" de Alcázar de San Juan - Ciudad Real
- Hospital General de Ciudad Real - Ciudad Real
- Hospital Universitario de Toledo - Toledo
- Hospital Virgen de la Luz - Cuenca
- Hospital Virgen de la Salud - Toledo

== Castile and León ==
- Hospital Universitario de León - León
- Nuevo Hospital de Burgos - Burgos

== Catalonia ==
=== Tarragona ===
- Hospital Joan XXIII - Tarragona
- Hospital San Joan de Reus - Reus, Tarragona
- Hospital Santa Tecla - Tarragona
- Pius Hospital de Valls- Valls, Tarragona

=== Barcelona ===
- Consorci Sanitari del Maresme - Mataró
- Hospital Cima de Barcelona - Barcelona
- Hospital Clínic de Barcelona - Barcelona
- Hospital de Barcelona - Barcelona
- Hospital de Bellvitge - l'Hospitalet de Llobregat, Barcelona
- Hospital de la Vall d'Hebron - Barcelona
- Hospital de Sabadell (Corporació Parc Taulí) - Sabadell
- Hospital de Sant Pau (until June 2009)
- Hospital de Terrassa - Terrassa
- Hospital del Mar- Barcelona
- Hospital Plató - Barcelona
- Hospital Quirón Barcelona - Barcelona
- Hospital Sant Joan de Déu Barcelona - Esplugues de Llobregat, Barcelona
- Hospital Universitari General de Catalunya - Sant Cugat del Vallès
- Hospital Universitari Germans Trias i Pujol - Badalona

=== Girona ===
- Clínica Girona Nephrology and Dialysis Service - Girona
- Josep Trueta University Hospital

=== Lleida ===
- Hospital Universitari Arnau de Vilanova - Lleida

== Extremadura ==
- Hospital de la Siberia
- Hospital Infanta Cristina de Badajoz
- Hospital la ruego
- Hospital San Pedro de Alcántara
- Hospital Universitario de Badajoz
- Hospital Universitario de Cáceres
- Hospital virgen Guadalupe

== Galicia ==
=== A Coruña ===
- Complexo Hospitalario Arquitecto Marcide - Professor Novoa Santos - Naval. Xerencia da Área de Ferrol - Ferrol
- Complexo Hospitalario Universitario de A Coruña - A Coruña
- Complexo Hospitalario Universitario de Santiago - Santiago de Compostela
- Fundación Pública Hospital da Barbanza - Santa Mariña de Ribeira
- Fundación Pública Hospital Virxe da Xunqueira - Cee, Galicia

=== Lugo ===
- Complexo Hospitalario Xeral-Calde - Lugo
- Hospital Comarcal de Monforte - Monforte de Lemos
- Hospital da Costa - Burela

=== Pontevedra ===
- Montecelo Hospital
- Quirón Miguel Domínguez Hospital (Pontevedra)
- Pontevedra Provincial Hospital
- University Hospital Complex of Pontevedra - Pontevedra
- University Hospital Complex Of Vigo - Vigo
- Fundación Pública Hospital do Salnés - Vilagarcía de Arousa

=== Ourense ===
- Complexo Hospitalario de Ourense - Ourense
- Fundación Hospital Verín - Verín
- Hospital Comarcal de Valdeorras - Valdeorras

== La Rioja ==
- Hospital San Pedro - Logroño

== Community of Madrid ==
Alcorcón

- Hospital Universitario Fundación Alcorcón

Coslada

- Hospital Universitario del Henares

Madrid

- Clínica Moncloa
- Hospital Carlos III
- Hospital Central de la Defensa (Military)
- Hospital Clínico San Carlos
- Hospital Dam
- Hospital de Emergencias Enfermera Isabel Zendal
- Hospital General Universitario Gregorio Marañón
- Hospital Infantil Universitario Niño Jesús
- Hospital Universitario 12 de Octubre
- Hospital Universitario de la Princesa
- Hospital Universitario Infanta Leonor
- Hospital Universitario La Paz
- Hospital Universitario Ramón y Cajal

Majadahonda

- Hospital Puerta del Hierro

Móstoles

- Hospital de Móstoles
- Hospital Universitario Rey Juan Carlos

Pozuelo de Alarcón

- Hospital Universitario Quirónsalud Madrid

== Region of Murcia ==
- Centro Médico Virgen de la Caridad - Cartagena
- Clínica Nuestra Señora de Belén - Murcia
- Hospital Comarcal del Noroeste - Caravaca de la Cruz
- Hospital de la Vega Lorenzo Guirao - Cieza
- Hospital General Universitario Santa Lucía - Cartagena
- Hospital HLA La Vega - Murcia
- Hospital Los Arcos - San Javier, Murcia
- Hospital Mesa del Castillo - Murcia
- Hospital Naval - Cartagena
- Hospital Perpetuo Socorro - Cartagena
- Hospital QuirónSalud - Murcia
- Hospital Rafael Méndez - Lorca
- Hospital Universitario Morales Meseguer - Murcia
- Hospital Universitario Reina Sofía- Murcia
- Hospital Universitario Santa María del Rosell - Cartagena
- Hospital Universitario Virgen de la Arrixaca - Murcia
- Hospital Virgen del Castillo - Yecla
- Santo y Real Hospital de Caridad - Cartagena

== Foral Community of Navarre ==
- Clinica Universitaria de Navarra Link - Pamplona

== Valencian Community ==
=== Valencia ===
- Casa de la salud - Valencia
- Clinica Quirón - Valencia
- Hospital 9 d'Octubre - Valencia
- Hospital Arnau de Vilanova - Valencia
- Hospital Clínic Universitari - Valencia
- Hospital de La Ribera - Alzira
- Hospital de Lliria - Lliria
- Hospital de Manises - Manises
- Hospital Francesc de Borja - Gandia
- Hospital General de Requena - Requena
- Hospital General Universitari - Valencia
- Hospital la Malva-Rosa - Valencia
- Hospital Lluis Alcanyís - Xàtiva
- Hospital Militar Vazquez Bernabeu - Valencia
- Hospital Nisa València al Mar - Valencia
- Hospital Universitari La Fe - Valencia
- Hospital Universitario Doctor Peset - Valencia
- Hospital Virgen del Consuelo - Valencia

=== Castellón ===
- Hospital Auxiliar de Segorbe - Segorbe
- Hospital Comarcal de Vinaròs - Vinaròs
- Hospital de Sagunto - Sagunto
- Hospital General Universitario de Castellón - Castellón de la Plana
- Hospital Provincial de Castellón - Castellón de la Plana
- Hospital Universitario de La Plana - Villareal

=== Alicante/Alacant ===
- Hospital General de Alicante - Alicante
- Hospital General de Dénia (Marina Salud) - Dénia
- Hospital General de Elche - Elche
- Hospital General de Elda - Elda
- Hospital General de Ontinyent - Ontinyent
- Hospital General Plá - Alicante
- Hospital Marina Baixa - Benidorm
- Hospital Público Virgen de Los Lirios - Alcoy
- Hospital Universitario de Torrevieja - Torrevieja
- Hospital Universitario del Vinalopó - Elche
- Hospital Universitario San Juan - San Juan de Alicante
- Hospital Universitario San Juan de Alicante - Alicante

== Autonomous regions ==
=== Melilla ===
- Hospital Comarcal de Melilla
- Hospital de la Cruz Roja
- Hospital del Rey
