= Montecelo Hospital =

Hospital in Pontevedra, Spain

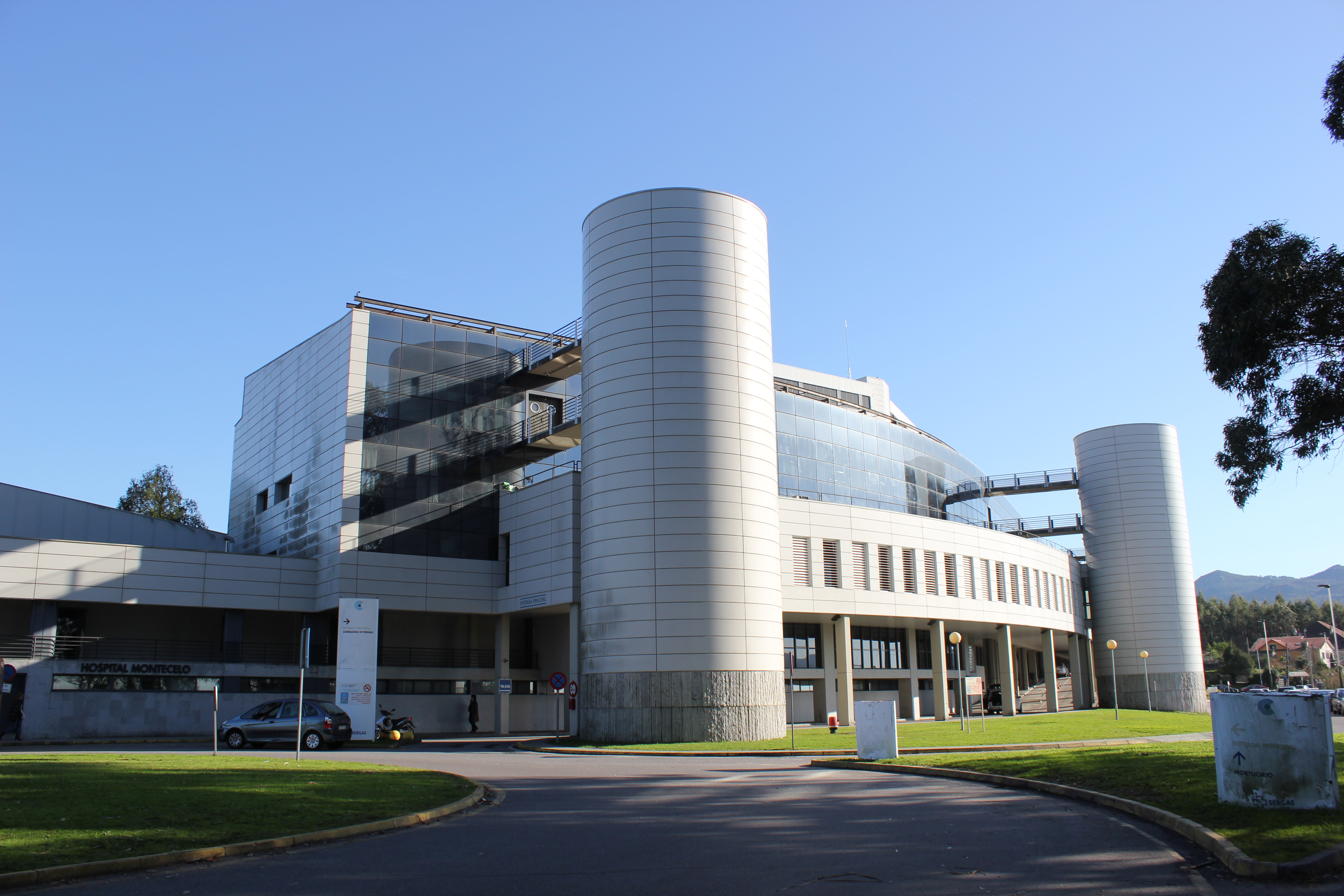
- Entrance building to Montecelo Hospital

Geography
- Location: Galicia, Spain
- Coordinates: 42°25′43.4″N 8°36′53.4″W (Pontevedra)

Organisation
- Care system: Public
- Type: Specialist
- Affiliated university: University of Santiago de Compostela, Pontevedra Campus, Galician Healthcare Service

Services
- Emergency department: Yes
- Speciality: multiple

History
- Opened: 1973

Links
- Website: www.sergas.es/A-nosa-organizacion/Estrutura-da-Area-Sanitaria-de-Pontevedra-e-O-Salnes?idioma=es
- Lists: Hospitals in Spain

Montecelo Hospital is a public hospital in the city of Pontevedra (Spain). It is located in the civil parish of Mourente, and was inaugurated in 1973. It is a general hospital, offering all or almost all medical and surgical specialties. It is part of the University Hospital Complex of Pontevedra.

== History and description ==
The main building, built in 1972 and inaugurated on 25 November 1973, had an area of 20,000 square metres. It was opened to the public as the Montecelo Social Security Health Residence. Its mentor was the Pontevedrian Gonzalo Cabanillas Gallas, who was the General Subdelegate of the National Social Security Institute.

The hospital was officially inaugurated by the then Minister of Labour and Social Security, Licinio de la Fuente, on 8 May 1974. It had 200 doctors, some of whom came from university hospitals such as La Paz in Madrid and La Fe in Valencia. Specialties that had not existed in the Provincial Hospital of Pontevedra until then were introduced, such as clinical physiology and rehabilitation, and made it possible to separate internal medicine from the specialties of digestive medicine, cardiology and radiology.

It was renovated and extended by the architects Julián Arranz Ayuso, Aurelio Botella Clarella, Joaquín Vaamonde Pradas and Antonio Alonso Taboada between 1987 and 1990.

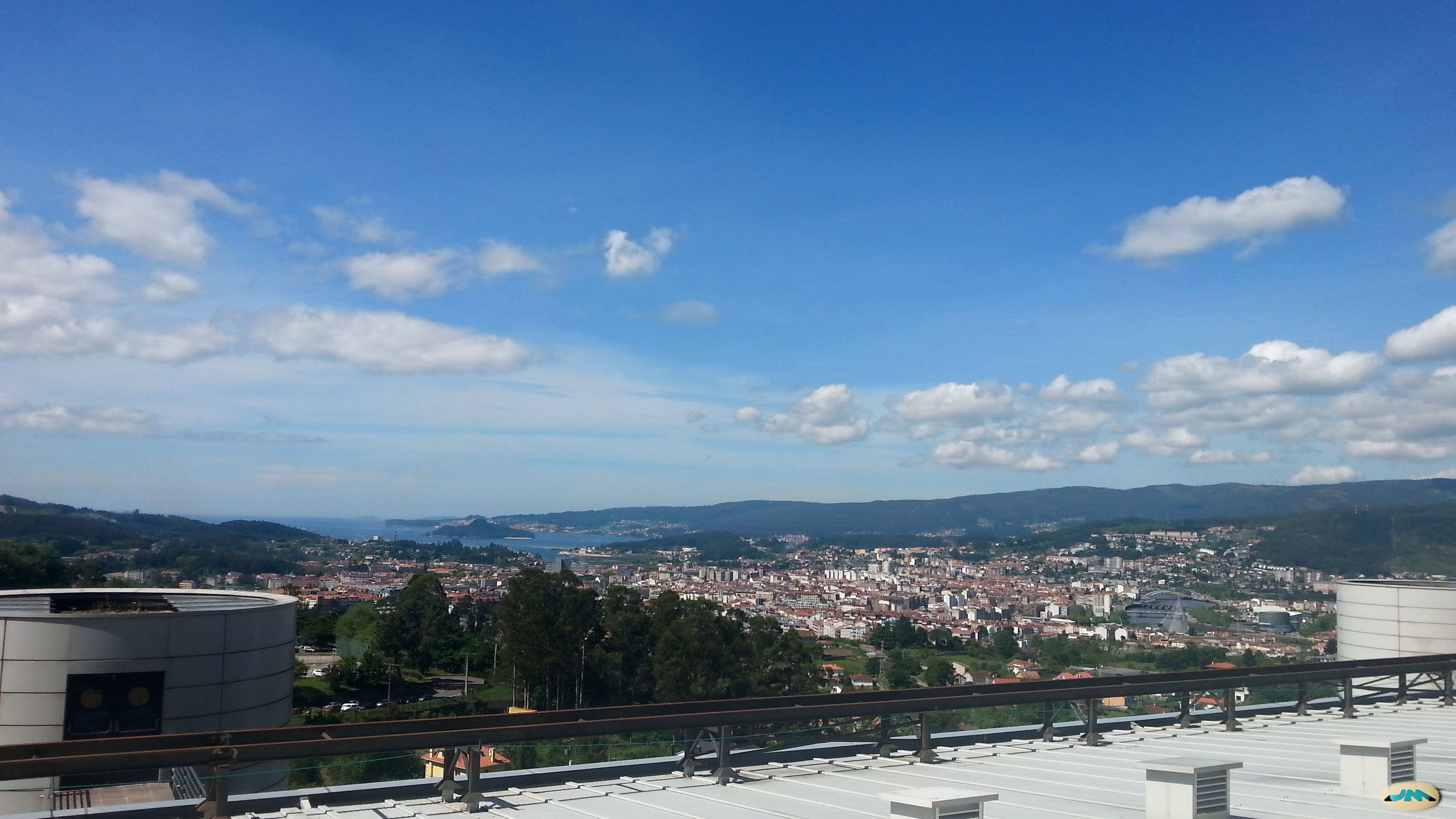
View of the city, the ria of Pontevedra and the island of Tambo from the 4th floor of the hospital.

The Montecelo Hospital underwent its biggest expansion between 1997 and 2001, carried out by the architectural firm Aidhos Arquitectura, in which a new annex building was built and two floors were added to the main building inaugurated in 1973.

Since 2012, when the Pontevedra Hospital Complex became the University Hospital Complex of Pontevedra, medical students from the Faculty of Medicine of Santiago de Compostela have been able to spend the last years of their clinical training there.

The main building has 8 floors.

== Access ==
Montecelo Hospital is served by line 2 (blue) of the city's urban bus service.

== New Gran Montecelo Hospital ==
The Xunta de Galicia has launched the construction of a new hospital for the city of Pontevedra and its health care area of 300,000 inhabitants in 2020, with more specialties than the current Montecelo Hospital, including radiotherapy, nuclear medicine and neonatal and paediatric intensive care, and a capacity of 724 beds. The new 10-storey referral hospital to be added to the existing hospital buildings will be called Gran Montecelo.

== See also ==
=== Related articles ===
- University Hospital Complex of Pontevedra
- Pontevedra Provincial Hospital
- Quirón Miguel Domínguez Hospital (Pontevedra)
- List of hospitals in Spain

=== External links ===
- Hospital Montecelo Sergas
