= Quirón Miguel Domínguez Hospital (Pontevedra) =

Hospital in Pontevedra, Spain

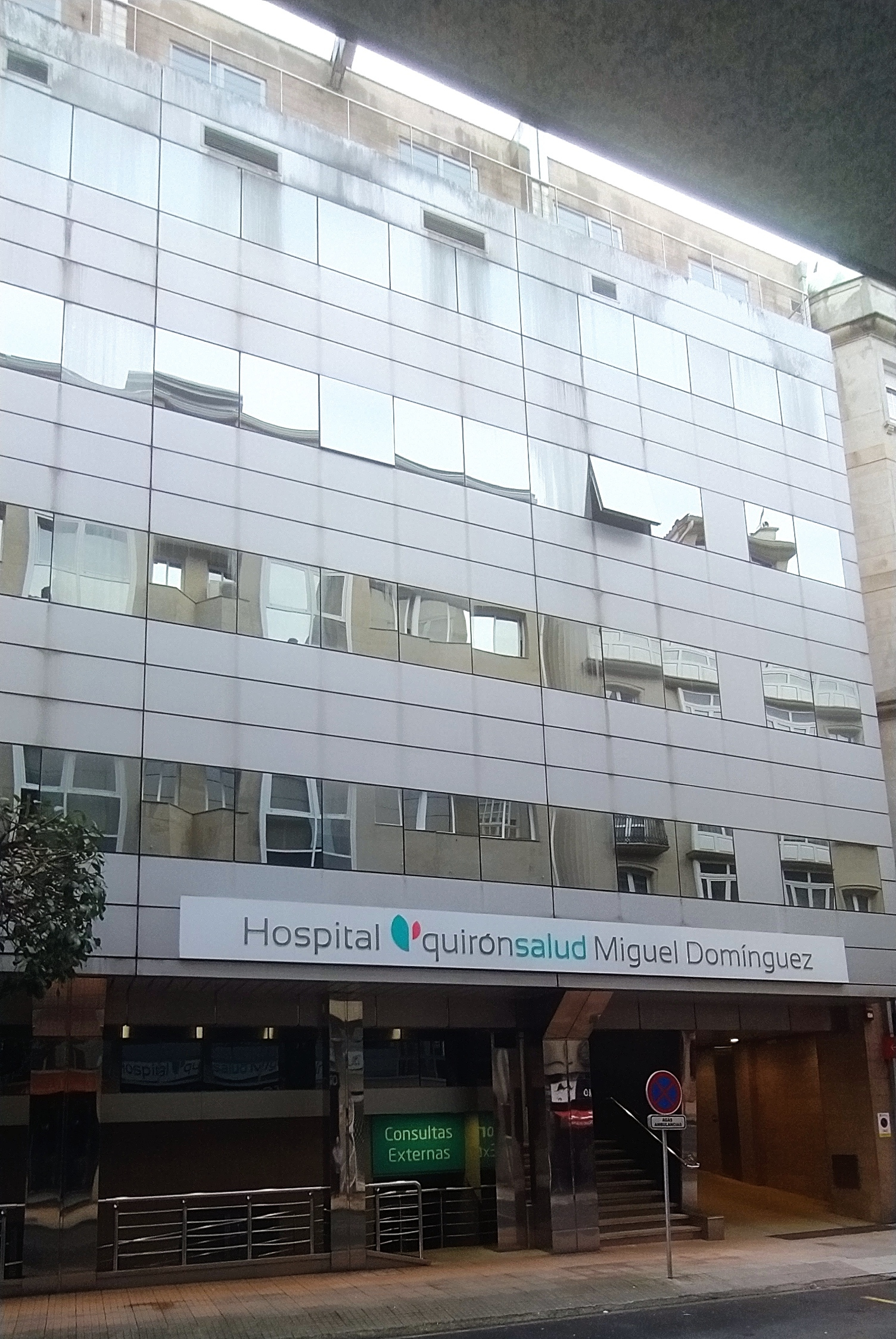
- Hospital entrance, Castelao Street

Geography
- Location: Galicia, Spain
- Coordinates: 42°25′46″N 8°38′32″W (Pontevedra)

Organisation
- Care system: Private
- Type: Specialist

Services
- Emergency department: Yes
- Speciality: multiple

History
- Opened: 1947

Links
- Website: www.quironsalud.es/migueldominguez
- Lists: Hospitals in Spain

The Quirónsalud Miguel Domínguez Hospital is a private general hospital located in the city of Pontevedra (Spain), managed by the Quirónsalud Hospital Group. It is located in the heart of the city centre.

== History ==
It was founded in 1947 as a clinic by the Asturian traumatologist surgeon Miguel Domínguez Rodríguez in Joaquín Costa Street. Originally, the hospital was 90% dedicated to traumatology, but it gradually became more professional and expanded its specialities until it became a general hospital. It operated as a family business from the inauguration of the clinic on 16 July 1949 until 1996, when the most important extension was carried out, with the construction of the section corresponding to Castelao Street.

It became a hospital in 2000. It was reopened as such on 1 February 2000, in the presence of the President of the Xunta de Galicia. In 2009, it became the Miguel Domínguez Hospital Group after the merger of three private institutions: the Miguel Domínguez Hospital, the Miguel Domínguez Polyclinic and the La Merced Medical Clinic. In 2011, it incorporated the Rehabilitation and Physiotherapy Centre in San Pedro de Alcántara Street into the hospital group.

On 16 October 2015, the private hospital group Quirónsalud bought the main hospital in the city centre from the Domínguez family, as well as the polyclinic specialities centre in Castelao Street, the rehabilitation and physiotherapy centre in San Pedro de Alcántara Street and the La Merced clinic in Andurique (Poio), very close to the city, which became the Neurorehabilitation Institute and was finally moved to the Quirón Hospital in the centre of Pontevedra in January 2024.

== Description ==
The Pontevedra Quirón Hospital has two entrances, one on Frei Xoán de Navarrete Street (main entrance) and one on Castelao Street, where the emergency and clinical analysis services are located. It has more than 50 specialist doctors, 5 operating theatres and advanced testing and diagnostic technologies. It also has other facilities such as an analysis laboratory and a conference room.

It was the first private health centre in Pontevedra to have an artificial respirator and to have a CT scan, magnetic resonance or "intelligent" operating rooms.

The hospital has an agreement with the Galician Health Service (Sergas) as an authorised hospital to send patients. This centre receives patients who are victims of work and traffic accidents.

== Gallery ==
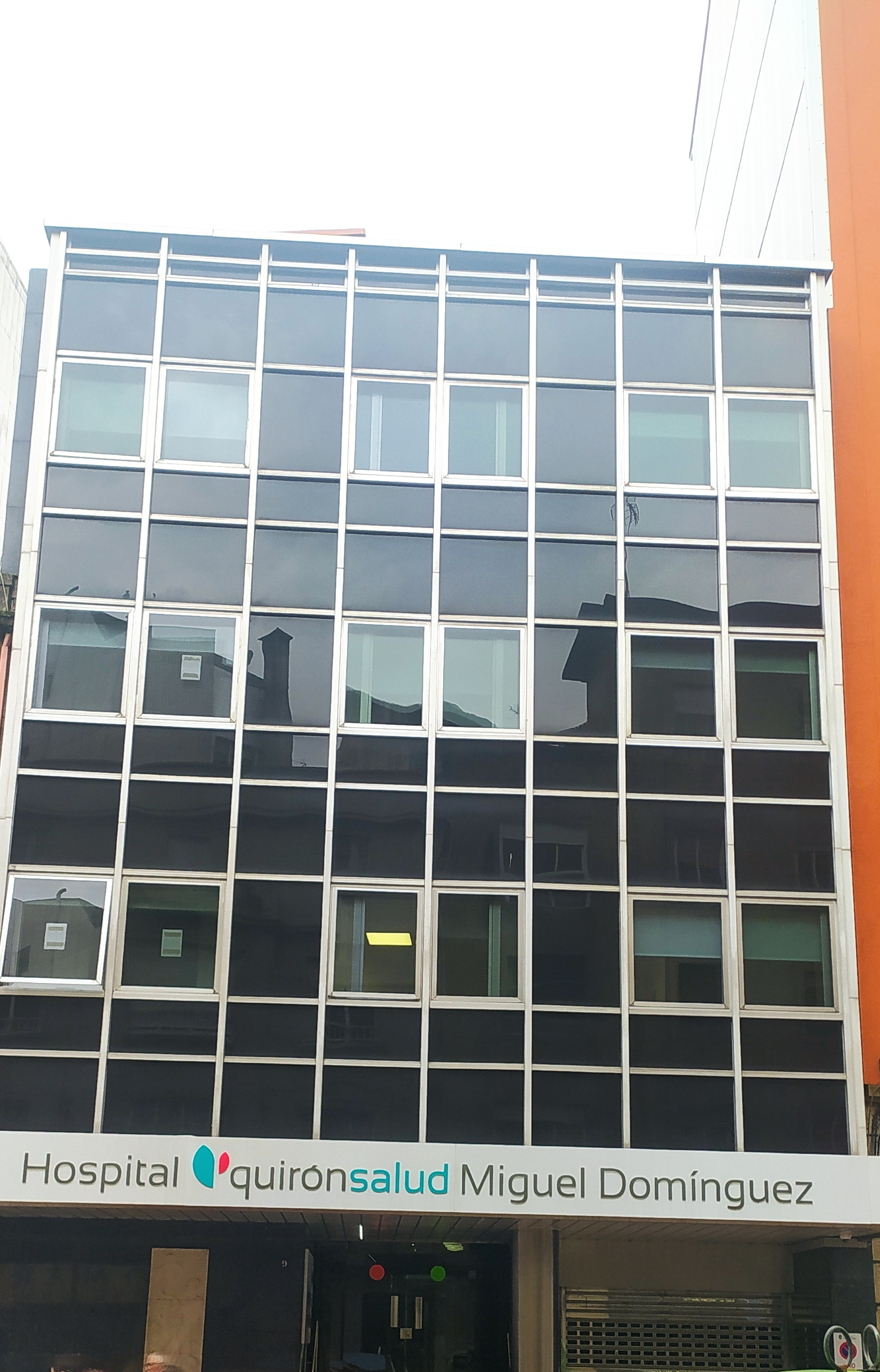
Front facade of the hospital in Frei Xoán de Navarrete Street

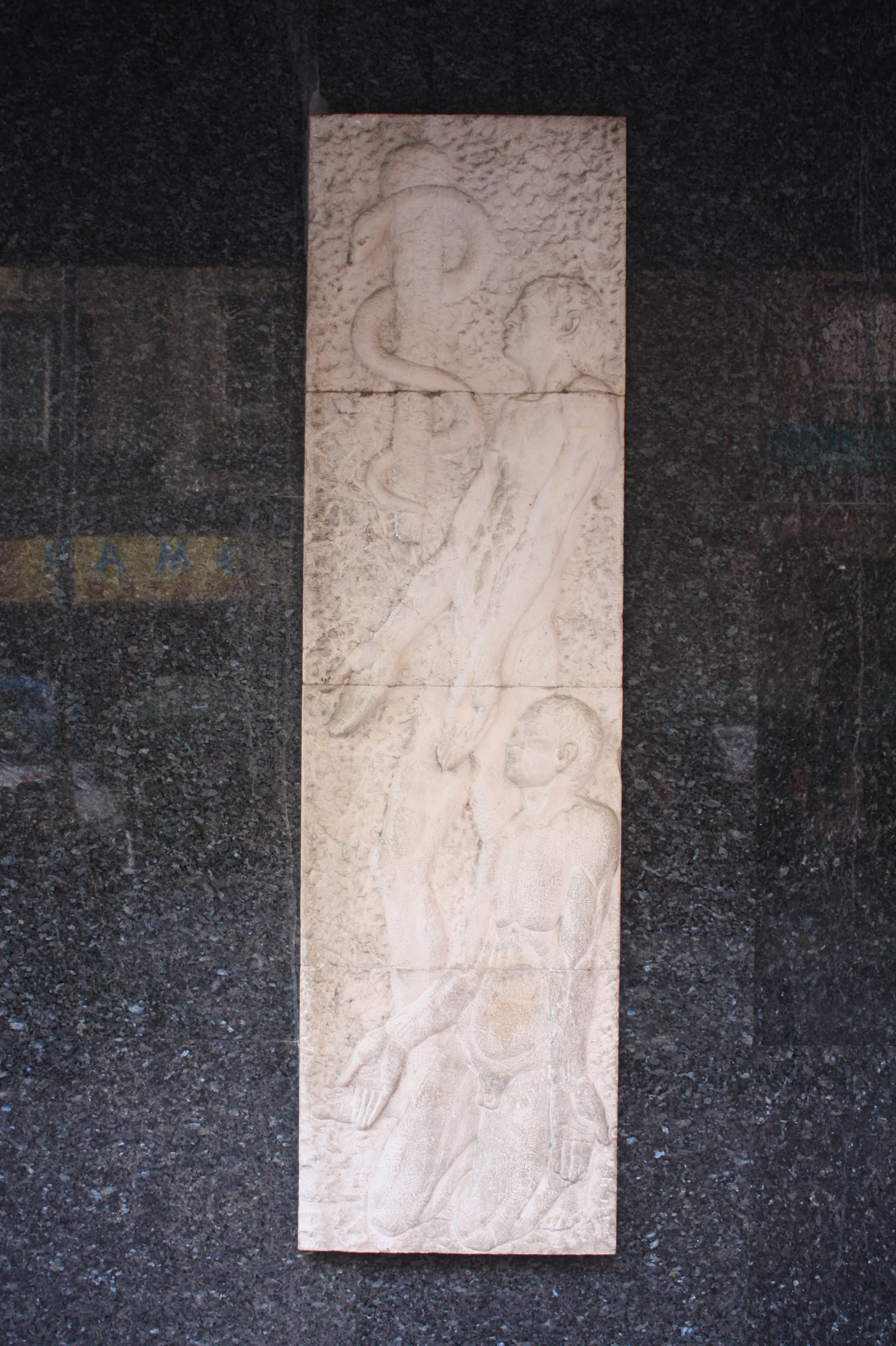
Relief representing medicine at the entrance to the hospital, by the sculptor Lucas Míguez

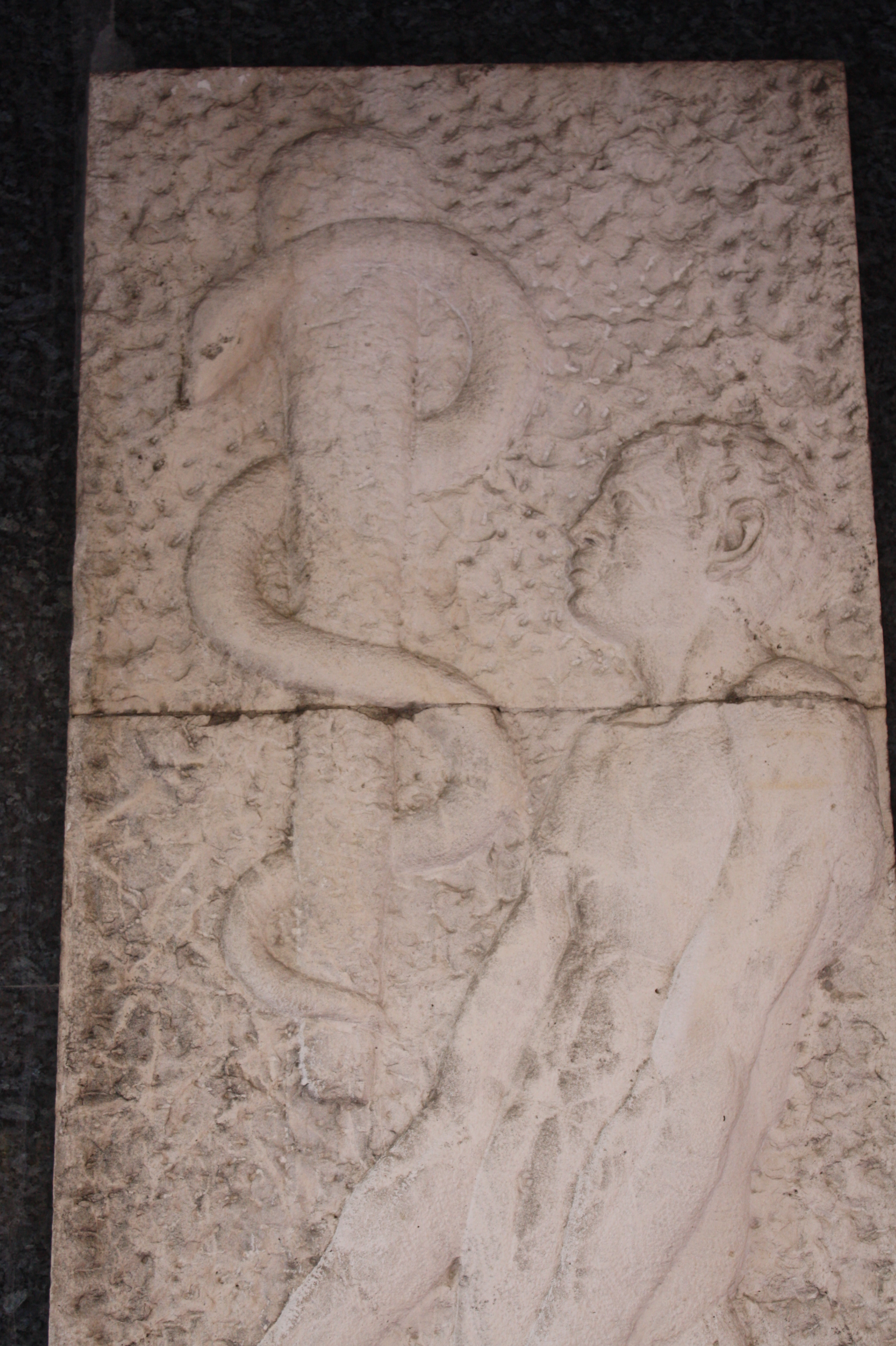
Detail of the relief at the main entrance to Frei Xoán de Navarrete Street

== See also ==
=== Related articles ===
- Montecelo Hospital
- Pontevedra Provincial Hospital
- University Hospital Complex of Pontevedra

=== External links ===
- Hospital Quirón Pontevedra website
