= University Hospital Complex Of Vigo =

University Hospital Complex of Vigo
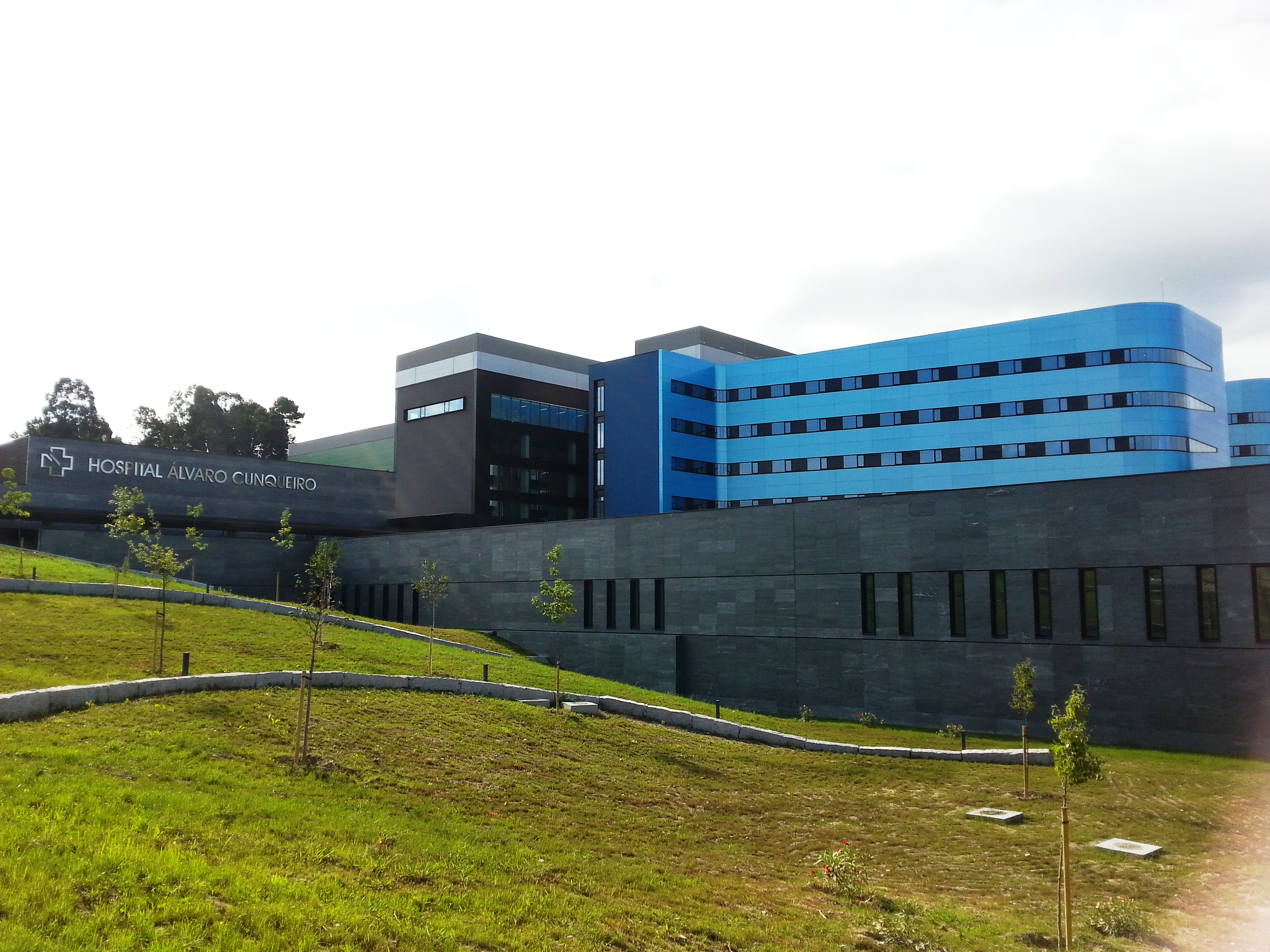
- Image =

Geography
- Location: Galicia, Spain
- Coordinates: 42.241352°N 8.720751°W (Vigo)

Organisation
- Care system: Concerted public & Private & Charity
- Type: Specialist
- Affiliated university: University of Vigo, Galician Healthcare Service

Services
- Emergency department: Yes
- Speciality: multiple

History
- Founded: 2004

Links
- Website: chuvi.sergas.es
- Lists: Hospitals in Spain

The University Hospital Complex of Vigo, known by the acronym CHUVI, is a public health institution established in 2004 that provides health services to the specialized region of the city of Vigo. It depends on the Galician Healthcare Service, and consists of five hospitals and two specialty centers.

== Structure ==
The CHUVI is composed of:

- Two general hospitals: Álvaro Cunqueiro and Meixoeiro.
- A hospital for outpatient surgery: Polyclinic Cies.
- A hospital for chronic patients and ambulatory care: Nicolás Peña.
- A hospital for psychiatric patients: Rebullón.
- Two centers and outpatient clinics: A Bent and Coia.

== Research ==
The Biomedical Foundation of the Hospital Complex of Vigo is a non-profit health interest classified and declared of Galician interest, under the protection of the Ministry of health of the Xunta de Galicia, which aims to promote biomedical research in the health area of Vigo.

== New Hospital de Vigo ==
The Xunta de Galicia in Vigo has built a new public hospital that will give health care to more than 600,000 residents of this city and its area of influence.

The new hospital "Álvaro Cunqueiro" has started his operations in August 2015, after all the patients from both hospitals, Xeral and Meixoeiro were moved to the new building, now is fully established and equipped to provide healthcare services in all medical and surgical specialities to all the metropolitan area of Gran Vigo.
