= University Hospital Arnau de Vilanova =

- Catalan Health Institute

Geography
- Location: Lleida, Catalonia, Spain
- Coordinates: 41°37′36″N 0°36′36″E

Organisation
- Type: General

Services
- Beds: 447

History
- Former name: General Moscardó
- Opened: 1956

Links
- Website: www.icslleida.cat
- Lists: Hospitals in Spain

The University Hospital Arnau de Vilanova (officially, Hospital Universitari Arnau de Vilanova in Catalan) is a public medical institution in Lleida, Catalonia, Spain, and the largest one in the surrounding area (terres de Lleida or terres de Ponent) and province.

It was opened in 1956. Not to be confused with a hospital in Valencia called Hospital Arnau de Vilanova, the hospital in Lleida is run by the Catalan Health Institute (ICS) and has a total of 447 beds. Nowadays named after the Valencian physician Arnau de Vilanova, its first official name (in Francoist Spain) was Residencia Sanitaria General Moscardó and belonged, at first, to the Instituto Nacional de Previsión (INP) and then to INSALUD until 1981, when it was transferred to the Generalitat de Catalunya.
