= Cristo de Tacoronte =

Statue of Jesus in Tacoronte, Tenerife, Canary Islands

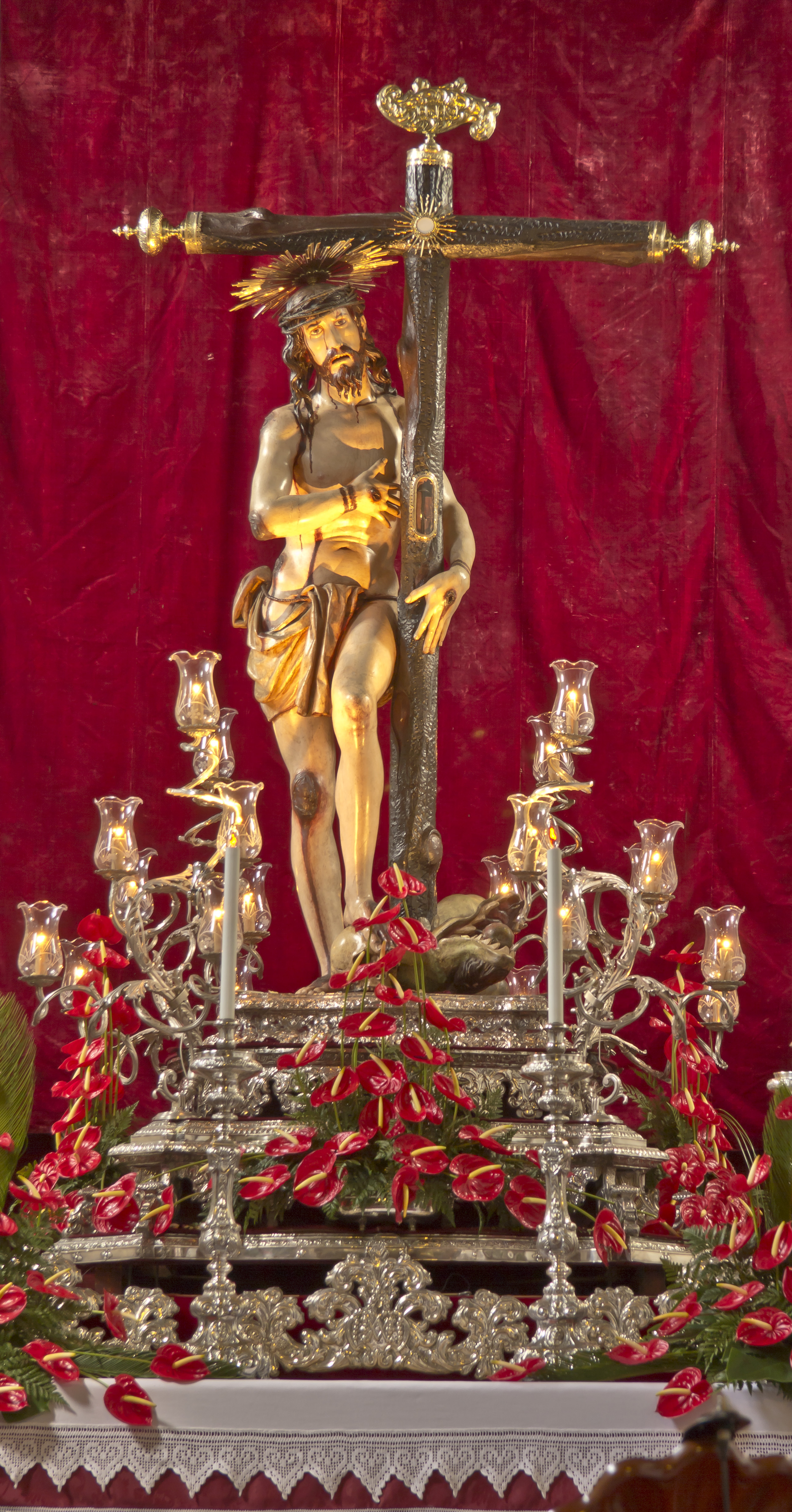
Cristo de Tacoronte

The Cristo de Tacoronte is a statue of Jesus Christ embracing the cross. It is located on the main altar of the Santuario del Cristo de Tacoronte in Tacoronte, on the island of Tenerife (Canary Islands, Spain). The Christ is the saint patron of Tacoronte.

The sculpture is attributed to the sculptor Domingo de Rioja and is one of the most revered religious images of the Canary Islands, in fact, is the representation of Jesus Christ most revered and famous of the Canary Islands, after the image of Cristo de La Laguna. The image came to Tenerife from Madrid in 1661, was brought to the island by Tomás Perera de Castro. The sculpture was not liked by the inquisitors of the islands, as the iconography of Christ not conformed to the Passion of Christ as told in the Bible.

The statue depicts a naked man clutching the cross alive despite bleeding profusely from his open sores on the hands, feet, knees and back, plus a lance on the side, and whose left foot crushes a skull around to which was wound a snake with an apple in his mouth. He was later allowed public devotion to this representation of Christ.

The Celebrations in his honor are held throughout the month of September being the main day on the September 14 (Day of the Exaltation of the Holy Cross). Another important day is the Octave of Christ, which is held in turn the second Sunday after your big day, the latter is very massive procession and is attended by people from all over the island of Tenerife, and the rest of the Canary Islands. The Christ also out in procession during Holy Week, the night of Palm Sunday with the Virgin of Sorrows and the morning of Resurrection Sunday alone.

== See also ==
- List of statues of Jesus
- Tacoronte
