= San Juan de Dios Hospital (Granada) =

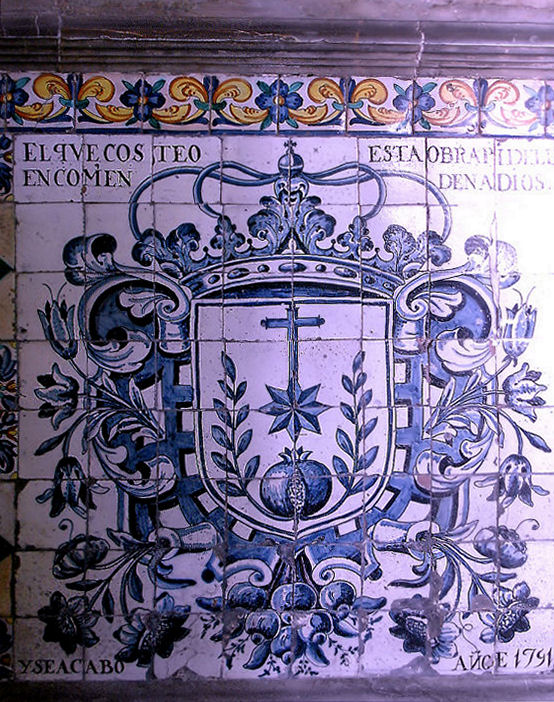

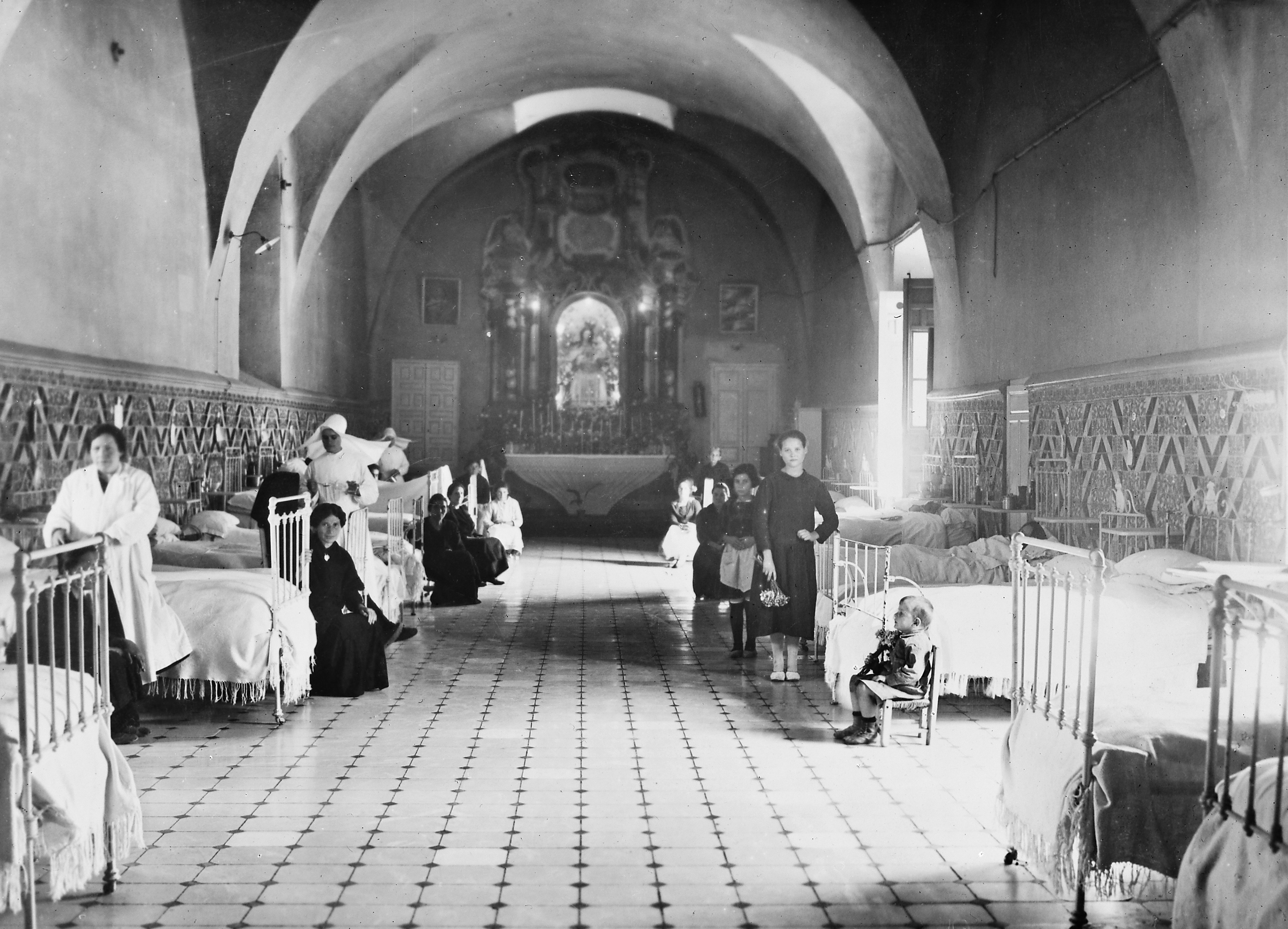
- Ward interior

Geography
- Location: Granada, Spain
- Coordinates: 37.180315°N 3.603014°W

Organisation
- Type: General
- Religious affiliation: Catholic church

Services
- Emergency department: No

Helipads
- Helipad: No

History
- Opened: 1544

Links
- Lists: Hospitals in Spain

San Juan de Dios Hospital is an institution in the Spanish city of Granada, situated next to the Basílica de San Juan de Dios It was founded by John of God (Juan de Dios in Spanish), a soldier turned healthcare worker. The site is now in the city centre, but when the hospital was founded it was outside the medieval walled city.

The saint's followers formed the Brothers Hospitallers of Saint John of God, who ran this hospital and maintained from its origin the dedication to healthcare for the most disadvantaged people. In the 19th century the hospital was lost by the Order as a result of the Ecclesiastical confiscations of Mendizábal. Despite this change of status in 1835, the building has always been part of the idiosyncrasy and spirit of the city as a symbol of hospitality. Over time, the Order of San Juan de Dios made numerous attempts to recover what is considered the Order's first hospital, until May 2015 when the Provincial Council of Granada approved a total transfer. It is intended that the premises should continue to be used to provide health care, apart from an area to be used as a museum.

The hospital can be seen as a symbol and living history of the contemporary healthcare model and a spirit of solidarity for the city. It is, therefore, a key piece to understand the history of the city over the years and the contribution of the Order to the improvement of the lives of its citizens.

== Architecture ==
The hospital is located in a Renaissance building, which was renovated and expanded in the seventeenth and eighteenth centuries., The hospital is protected as a Bien de Interés Cultural. It is famous for its baroque interior and important artworks.
