= Hospital Universitario Insular de Gran Canaria =

Coordinates: 28.0811°N 15.4173°W

Hospital Universitario Insular de Gran Canaria (Insular University Hospital of Gran Canaria)
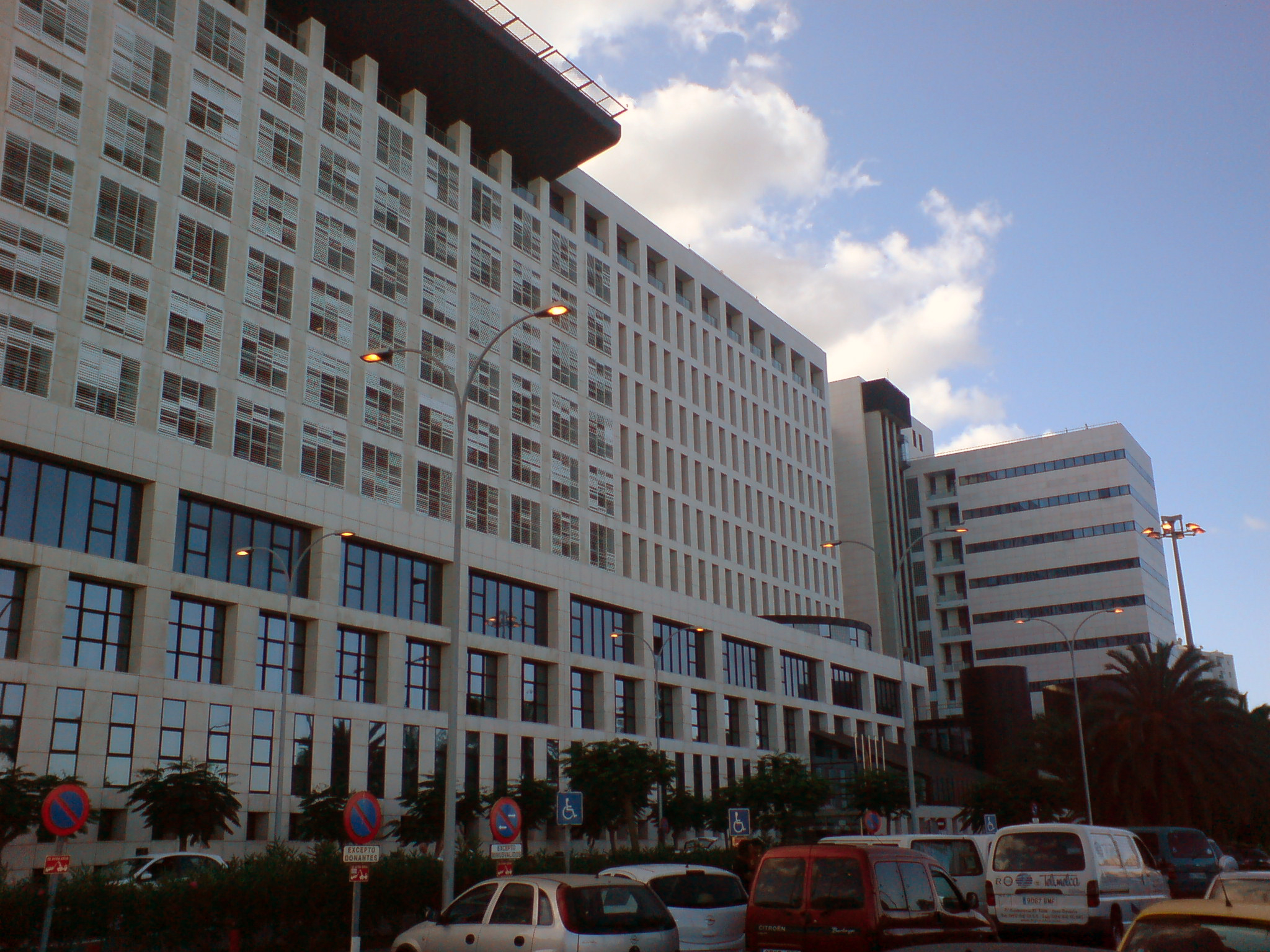
- Main building

Geography
- Location: Las Palmas de Gran Canaria

Organisation
- Affiliated university: University of Las Palmas de Gran Canaria

History
- Founded: 1971

Links
- Other links: List of hospitals in Spain

The Hospital Universitario Insular de Gran Canaria (Insular University Hospital of Gran Canaria) is a teaching hospital of general scope in Gran Canaria (Canary Islands, Spain). Located in the city of Las Palmas de Gran Canaria, it was founded 13 February 1971 and consists in February 2021 of 503 beds. The first patient was hospitalized 20 September 1971.

The hospital is managed by the Canarian Government via the Servicio Canario de Salud (Canary Health Service) and is geared to health care in the south and east of Gran Canaria (Telde, Valsequillo, Ingenio, Agüimes, Santa Lucía de Tirajana, San Bartolomé de Tirajana, Mogán and the south of Las Palmas de Gran Canaria). It is also the referral hospital of Fuerteventura and a referral hospital in some specialities of the Canary Islands.
