= University Hospital Complex of Pontevedra =

University Hospital Complex in Pontevedra, Spain

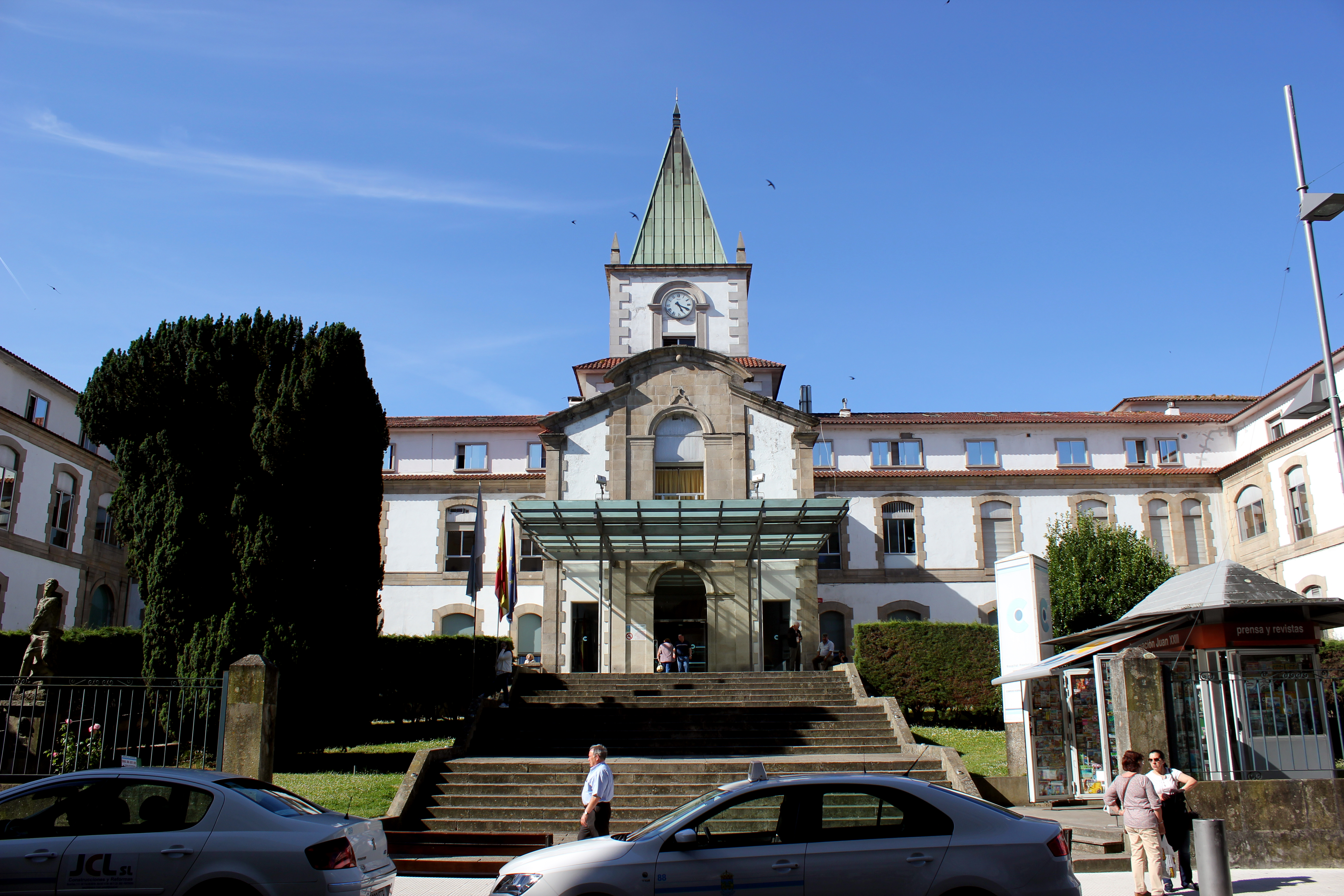
- Pontevedra Provincial Hospital

Geography
- Location: Galicia, Spain
- Coordinates: 42°25′43.4″N 8°36′53.4″W (Pontevedra)

Organisation
- Care system: Concerted public & Private & Charity
- Type: Specialist
- Affiliated university: University of Santiago de Compostela, Pontevedra Campus, Galician Healthcare Service

Services
- Emergency department: Yes
- Speciality: multiple

History
- Opened: 2012

Links
- Website: www.sergas.es/A-nosa-organizacion/Estrutura-da-Area-Sanitaria-de-Pontevedra-e-O-Salnes?idioma=es
- Lists: Hospitals in Spain

The University Hospital Complex of Pontevedra (CHOP) is a public health institution and a teaching hospital established in 2012 that provides health services to the specialized region of the city of Pontevedra in Spain. It depends on the Galician Healthcare Service, and consists of three hospitals and one specialty center.

== Location ==
The Montecelo Hospital is located on the outskirts of the city, in Mourente. The Provincial Hospital of Pontevedra is located in the heart of the city, at Doctor Loureiro Crespo Street, 2.

== History ==
In 1439, Pontevedra had three hospitals: the Hospital Santiaguiño del Burgo, for poor pilgrims, the Hospital Virgen del Camino for lepers and, in A Moureira, the Hospital Gafos, located at the mouth of the river Gafos. In the middle of that year, in 1439, D.ª Teresa Pérez Fiota, made a will to found a hospital to assist the poor, which would be called Hospital do Corpo de Deus, which, with time, would be known as Hospital of Corpus Christi and, later, in 1579, as Hospital San Juan de Dios, which would be demolished in 1896 to build in another part of the city a new hospital, the Provincial Hospital of Pontevedra.

The first major hospital in the city was the Provincial Hospital of Pontevedra. The decision to create this hospital was taken by the city council in 1890. In 1897, the first patients were accepted. In 1928 it was transferred to the Provincial Council of Pontevedra. At the hospital, preferably surgical, advanced operations were performed for its time. The hospital's doctors were of great importance in the life of the city. In 1936, the hospital was mainly used as a war hospital.

The second and largest hospital in the city is the Montecelo Hospital, established in 1973. It was inaugurated in May 1974 by the then Minister of Health, Licinio de la Fuente.

The Galician Healthcare Service of the Galician Government decided to integrate these two hospitals into a hospital complex called Complejo Hospitalario de Pontevedra (CHOP) in 1996.

The CHOP (Complejo Hospitalario de Pontevedra) was declared a University Hospital Complex (CHU) in November 2012. The declaration as a University Hospital Complex (CHU) has allowed the hospitals of Pontevedra to offer courses in the University of Santiago de Compostela Medicine degree and other health science degrees such as Nursing or Physiotherapy, which are present on the Pontevedra Campus.

The Galician Government has launched the construction of a new hospital for the city of Pontevedra and its metropolitan area in 2020 with more specialities than the current one, including radiotherapy, nuclear medicine and neonatal and paediatric intensive care, and with a capacity of 724 beds. The new 10-storey hospital will be called Gran Montecelo.

== Hospitals ==
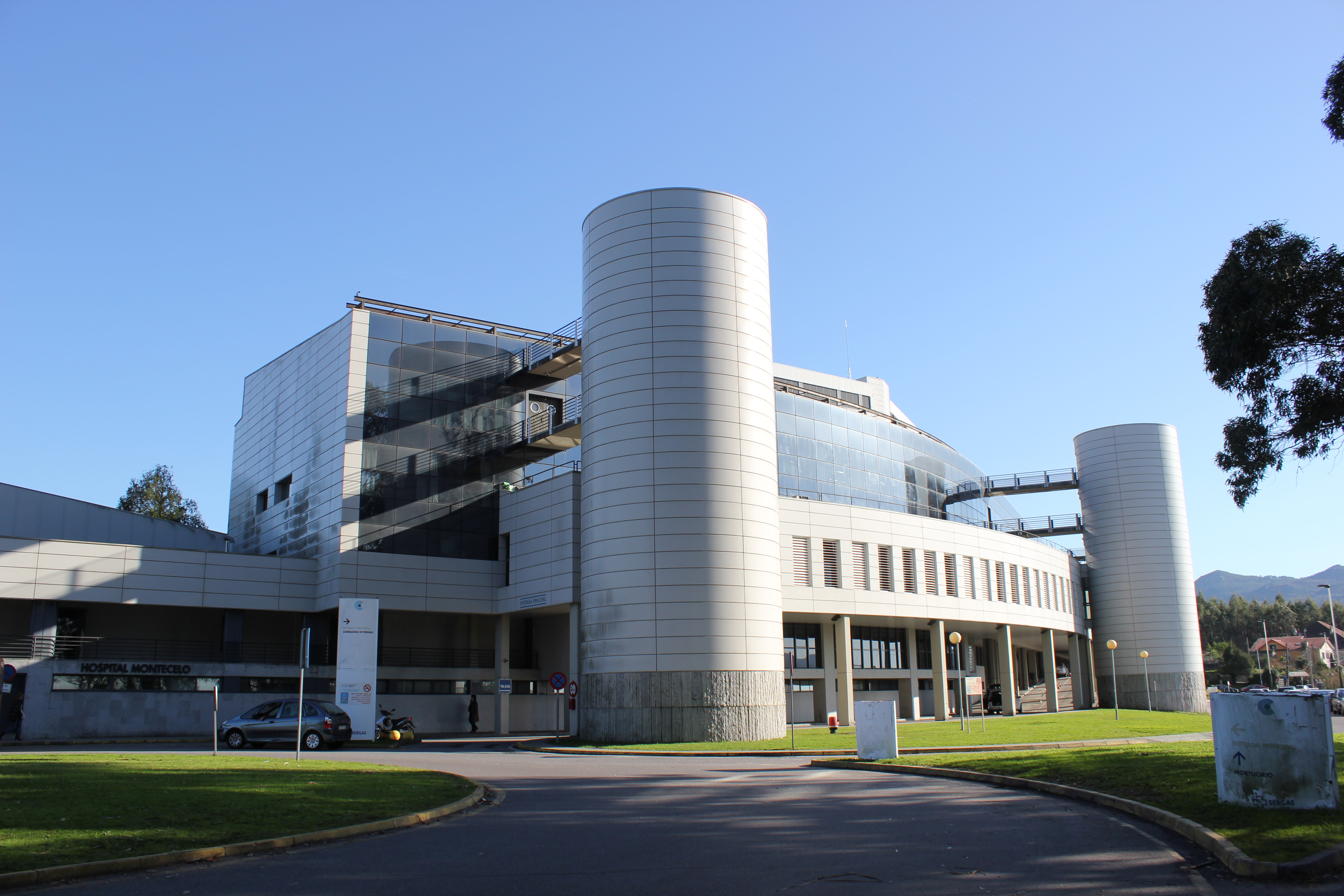
Montecelo Hospital entrance

The CHOP has two hospitals in Pontevedra city:

- Montecelo Hospital.
- Pontevedra Provincial Hospital.

There is also a hospital in the Pontevedra health area:

- Salnés Hospital Foundation

In addition, the specialised medical centre or specialty centre Casa del Mar in the district of Mollavao in Pontevedra is attached to it.

The CHU of Pontevedra offers public health care to the population of the centre and north of the province of Pontevedra. The focus is on the following municipalities, in addition to the capital, Pontevedra: Barro, Bueu, Caldas de Reis, Campo Lameiro, Cerdedo-Cotobade, Cuntis, Forcarei, O Grove, A Lama, Marín, Meaño, Meis, Moraña, Poio, Ponte Caldelas, Portas, Sanxenxo, Soutomaior and Vilaboa. It is also a referral hospital for patients from the Salnés hospital, which is included in the Pontevedra health area. It includes the following municipalities: Cambados, Catoira, Illa de Arousa, Ribadumia, Vilagarcía de Arousa and Vilanova de Arousa.

The University Hospital Complex of Pontevedra is a reference hospital for more than 300,000 patients. Its staff is made up of 2,608 workers.

== Related articles ==
- List of hospitals in Spain
- Pontevedra Provincial Hospital
- Pontevedra Campus
- Teaching hospital
