= Pontevedra Provincial Hospital =

Historic building in Galicia, Spain

- Hospital Provincial de Pontevedra
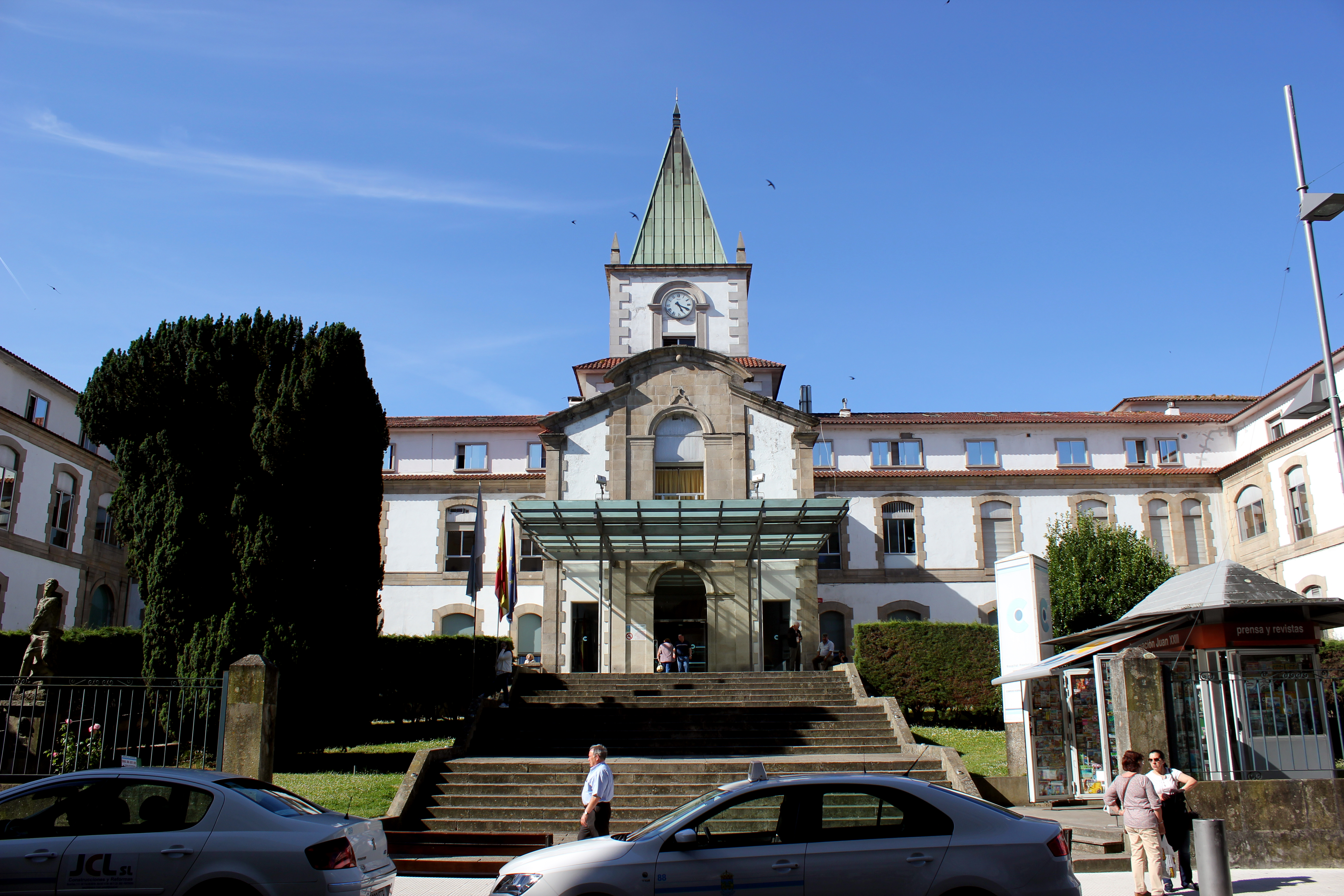
- Pontevedra Provincial Hospital north façade
- Interactive map of the Pontevedra Provincial Hospital area

General information
- Type: Hospital
- Location: Pontevedra, Galicia, Spain
- Coordinates: 42°25′45.0″N 8°38′15.0″W
- Construction started: 1 March 1894
- Completed: 14 December 1897
- Opening: 14 December 1897
- Owner: Xunta de Galicia
- Management: Galician Healthcare Service

Technical details
- Floor count: 3

Design and construction
- Architect: Siro Borrajo Montenegro
- Structural engineer: León Domercq Alzúa
- Main contractor: Pontevedra City Council

The Pontevedra Provincial Hospital is a building dating from 1897, located in the city centre of Pontevedra, Spain.

== History ==
The origins of the Provincial Hospital go back to the hospital in Pontevedra founded in 1439 by testamentary disposition of Teresa Pérez Fiota, called Hospital del Cuerpo de Dios (Hospital of the Body of God). The Brothers of San Juan de Dios ran the hospital under the name of Hospital Corpus Christi until the 19th century.

After the Spanish confiscation of Mendizábal in 1849, the hospital (located in the block of Real Street and Curros Enríquez Square) became the property of the municipality of Pontevedra. Due to the deterioration of the building and in order to raise funds to complete the construction of a new hospital, the town council decided to demolish it and build the new hospital on a plot of land on the Orense road (now Doctor Loureiro Crespo Street).

The provincial hospital was promoted by the doctor Ángel Cobián Areal, mayor of the city between 1891 and 1893. The decision to create this hospital was taken by the city council in 1890. The construction project was entrusted to the civil engineer León Domercq, who was in charge of the provincial public works headquarters and the port works commission, and was directed by the architect Siro Borrajo. Work began on 1 March 1894. The new building was inaugurated on 14 December 1897. One of the first X-rays in Galicia was taken in 1897, two years after the discovery of X-rays in 1895.

The hospital became the property of the Provincial Council of Pontevedra in 1928. In 1936, the hospital was mainly used as a war hospital. From then on, successive extensions were made and new buildings were constructed. In 1996, the hospital was transferred to the Galician Healthcare Service (SERGAS) and its management was taken over by the Xunta de Galicia.

== Description ==
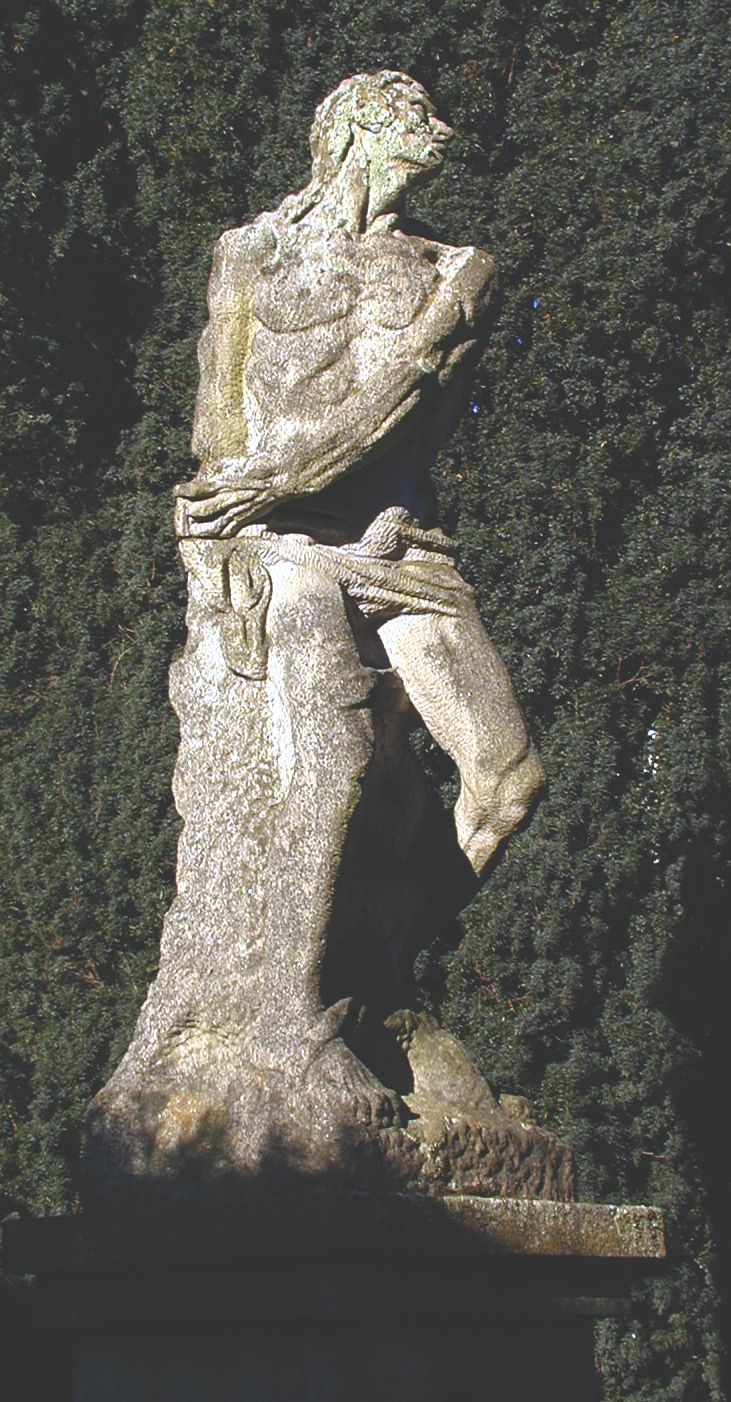
Statue of Manuel Barreiro Cabanelas

It is a large building, originally H-shaped and two floors high, with later additions. Today, the original building is three floors high and the complex has later additions from different periods in the 20th century.

The original building by León Domercq and Siro Borrajo had a ground floor, a first floor and a basement. It is a massive granite masonry building with multiple openings with simple frames on all the façades. The walls are plastered white with lime mortar, leaving only the granite visible in the window and door frames.

The main entrance has a central projecting body on which a tower (added to the original building) with a spire-shaped roof stands out, on the four walls of which there are four clocks. The old Hospital San Juan de Dios, which was replaced by the Provincial Hospital, also had a clock, which was installed in the north tower of the Church of the Pilgrim Virgin when the building was demolished to build the new hospital.

The main entrance to the hospital is presided over by a wide central staircase leading to the building, on the first landing of which is the statue dedicated to Manuel Barreiro Cabanelas (a great benefactor of the hospital), created in 1942 by the sculptor Francisco Asorey.

It was one of the first hospitals to have X-rays, heating and electricity.

== Bibliography ==
- Fontoira Surís, Rafael (2009). Pontevedra monumental (in Galician). Pontevedra: Deputación de Pontevedra. p. 455. ISBN 978-8403509344.

== See also ==
=== Related articles ===
- University Hospital Complex of Pontevedra
- Montecelo Hospital
- Quirón Miguel Domínguez Hospital (Pontevedra)
- School of Nursing of Pontevedra
