= María Rosa Alonso =

Spanish academic (1909–2011)

- Born: 28 December 1909; Tacoronte, Tenerife, Spain
- Died: 27 May 2011 (aged 101); Puerto de la Cruz, Tenerife, Spain
- Other name: María Luisa Villalba
- Education: Complutense University of Madrid
- Employer(s): University of La Laguna, University of the Andes
- Family: Elfidio Alonso

María Rosa Alonso (pseudonym, María Luisa Villalba; 28 December 1909 – 27 May 2011) was a Spanish professor, philologist, essayist from the Canary Islands.

== Biography ==
María Rosa Alonso was born in Tacoronte, Tenerife on 28 December 1909. Her early works published in newspapers used the pseudonym of "María Luisa Villalba". The first article was titled "En torno a los libros de la guerra" ("Around the books of war"), and was published in the newspaper La Tarde in 1930. In 1932, she promoted the establishment of the Institute of Studies in the Canaries, and was a founding member of the organization. From 1939, she was a member of Museo Canario, although she had collaborated with the institution previously. In 1941, she was licensed in Spanish Philology in Madrid, having been a student of José Ortega y Gasset and Américo Castro.

Between 1942 and 1953, Alonso was a professor at the Faculty of Philosophy and Letters of the University of La Laguna. She earned her PhD at the Central University of Madrid (now Complutense University of Madrid) in 1948 with a thesis entitled "El Poema de Viana, Estudio histórico-literario de un poema épico del siglo XVII" ("The Poem of Viana, Historical-literary study of an epic poem of the seventeenth century "), directed first by D. Dámaso Alonso, and then by D. Joaquín de Entrambasaguas. Continuing with her research, she published various essays and articles. After having been banned from teaching by the Francoist government due to the republican affiliation of her family (her brother Elfidio Alonso had been deputy for the Republican Union party and was in exile and sentenced to death), she began the procedures to present herself to the University chair. After having been informed unofficially, but very clearly, that she would never be a professor there, Alonso resigned from teaching at the University of La Laguna and emigrated to Venezuela in 1953. Between 1958 and 1967, she was a professor of Spanish Philology at University of the Andes, in Mérida, Venezuela. In 1968, she removed to Madrid and published new works,. She participated in the "Politeia" foundation, dedicated to the promotion and development of cultural and artistic activities. In 1999, she returned to Tenerife.

Alonso was secretary and editor of the student magazine "Journals of the Faculty of Philosophy and Letters of Madrid " and also secretary of the "History Magazine of the University of La Laguna".

She died in Puerto de la Cruz, Tenerife on 27 May 2011.

== Awards and honors ==
- "Leoncio Rodríguez" Journalism Prize
- Premio Canarias de Literatura
- Bronze Medal of the "Order of 27 June" by the Ministry of Education of Venezuela
- Diploma of Honor and the Silver Medal from the University of Los Andes (Venezuela)
- Gold Medal of the island of Tenerife
- Honorary Member of the Press Association of Santa Cruz de Tenerife
- 1986, award of the Center of the Canarian Popular Culture; it was part of the Royal Economic Society of Friends of the Country of Tenerife
- 2010, celebration of a Day in her honor in the Canary Islands, in compliance with a resolution of the Parliament of the Canary Islands
- The institute previously called 'IES Añaza' in the Añaza neighborhood, in Santa Cruz de Tenerife, changed its name to IES Mª Rosa Alonso as a tribute.

== Selected works ==
- San Borondón, signo de Tenerife (1940)
- En Tenerife, una poetisa. Victoria Bridoux Mazzini 1935-1862 (1940 y 1944). unavida OK seco, el pelD
- Con la voz del silencio (1945)
- Otra vez (novela) (1951)
- El Poema de Viana (1952)
- Pulso del tiempo (1953)
- Manuel Verdugo y su obra poética (1955)
- Residente en Venezuela (1960)
- Apuntes de ortografía española con explicaciones de léxico. Para uso de principiantes (1966)
- Sobre el español que se escribe en Venezuela (1967)
- Papeles tinerfeños (1972)
- La ciudad y sus habitantes (1989)
- Santa Cruz, vocación de futuro (1989)
- Las generaciones y cuatro estudios (1990)
- La Luz llega del Este (1998)
