= Santa Mariña de Ribeira =

Ribeira, Santa Mariña de (Also Sta. Marina de Ribeira in Spanish Castilian) is one of the 51 boroughs which constitute the, predominantly very rural, municipality of A Estrada, Pontevedra, Galicia North Western Spain.

It is located at 42°44.42′N 8°26.36′W. Altitude: 74m
