= Hospital Universitario Nuestra Señora de Candelaria =

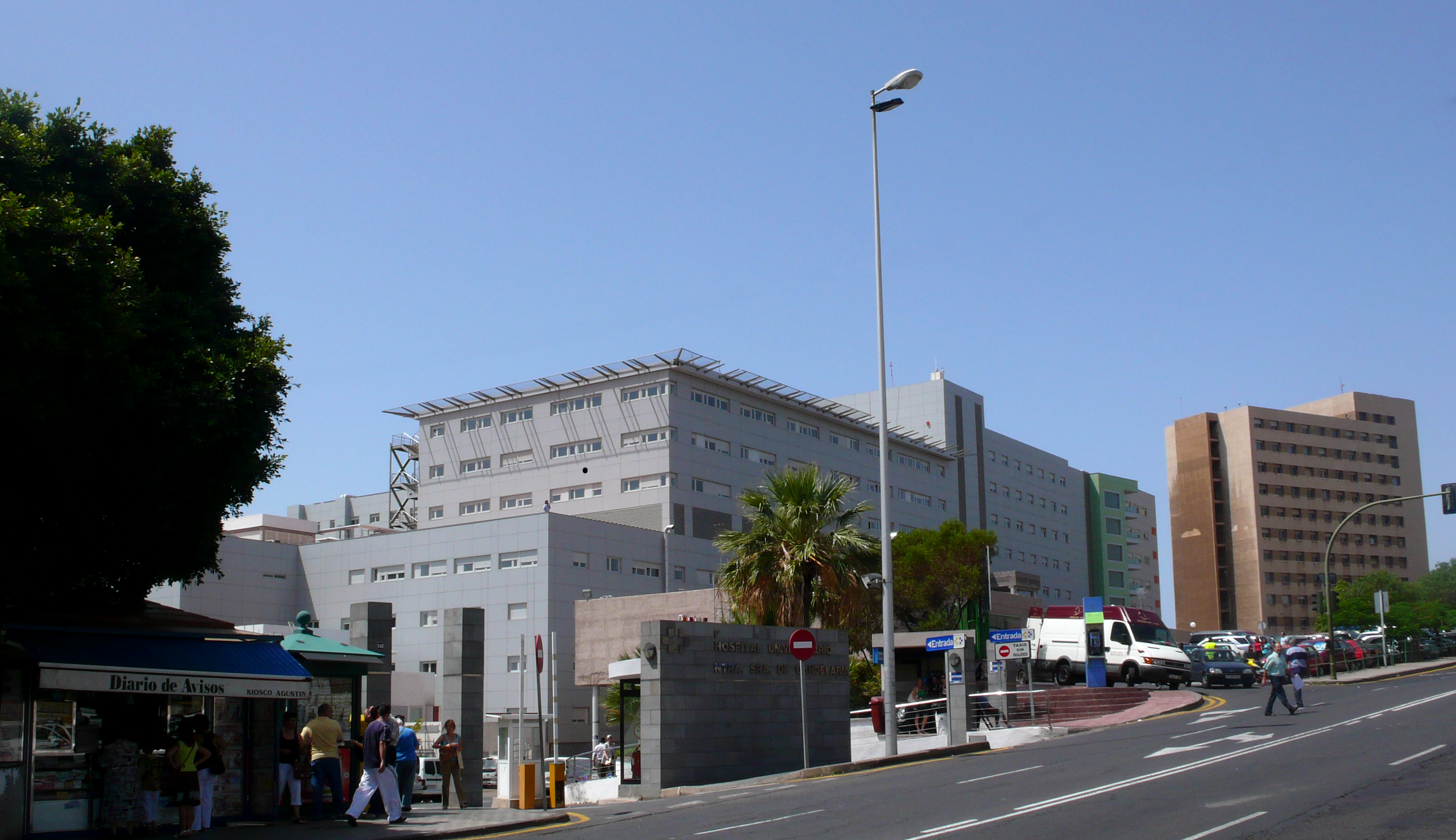

Geography
- Location: Santa Cruz de Tenerife, Tenerife, Spain
- Coordinates: 28°26′54″N 16°17′06″W

Organisation
- Affiliated university: Servicio Canario de Salud and Universidad de La Laguna

Services
- Beds: 960

History
- Founded: 1966

Links
- Website: www.hospitaldelacandelaria.com
- Lists: Hospitals in Spain
- Other links: List of hospitals in Spain

Hospital Universitario Nuestra Señora de Candelaria or University Hospital of the Nuestra Señora de Candelaria is a large teaching hospital of general scope in Tenerife (Canary Islands, Spain). Located in the city of Santa Cruz de Tenerife.

== Hospital ==
Affiliated with the Servicio Canario de la Salud. The hospital has specialist facilities which not only serve Tenerife but the surrounding Canary Islands. The hospital adopted the name of the patron saint of the Canary Islands, the Virgin of Candelaria. It is the largest hospital complex in the Canary Islands.

It is near the Hospital Universitario de Canarias, a referral hospital in some specialties in Spain.

It has a useful floor area of 82,035 m^{2}. The hospital complex is well connected to the motorways of the North and South of Tenerife.

With a total of 3,391 professionals, it is geared to medical care in the south of Tenerife, and referral hospital for the islands of La Gomera and El Hierro. Furthermore, due to its structural and technological characteristics and depending on the needs that it is demanding, it is credited as reference for all health areas of the Canary Islands, the service Liver Transplant and service of Allergology for the Province of Santa Cruz de Tenerife.
