= Tacoronte =

- Municipality and city
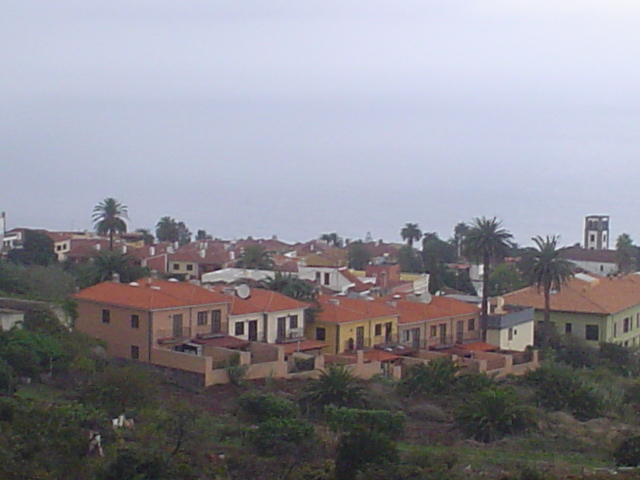

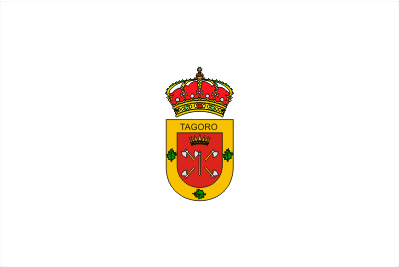
- Flag Coat of arms

- Location in Tenerife

- Location in Province of Santa Cruz de Tenerife Tacoronte (Canary Islands) Tacoronte (Spain, Canary Islands)
- Coordinates: 28°29′N 16°25′W
- Country: Spain
- Autonomous community: Canary Islands
- Province: Santa Cruz de Tenerife
- Island: Tenerife

Area
  - Total: 30.09 km^{2} (11.62 sq mi)
- Elevation: 510 m (1,670 ft)

Population (2025-01-01)
  - Total: 24,619
  - Density: 818.2/km^{2} (2,119/sq mi)
- Demonym: Tacoronterso
- Time zone: UTC+1 (CET)
  - Summer (DST): UTC+2 (CEST)
- Postal code: 38350
- Official language(s): Spanish
- Website: Official website

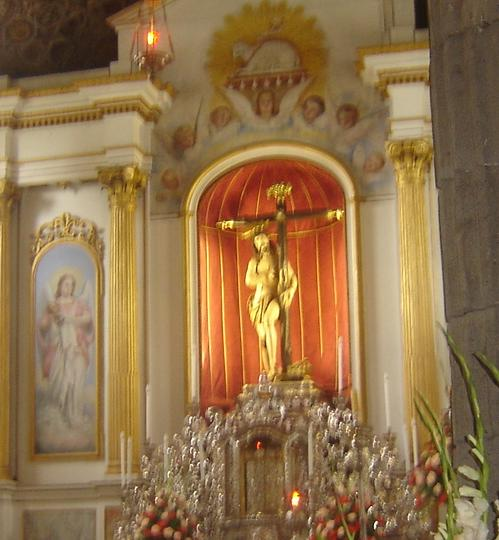
Cristo de Tacoronte

Tacoronte is a city and municipality of Tenerife, Canary Islands, Spain. It is located in the north-east of the island. Mostly rural, the municipality stretches for 30 square kilometers from the volcanic peaks that rise in the center of the island to the Atlantic shore. The municipality seat, also called Tacoronte, lies about 16 km west of the capital, Santa Cruz de Tenerife. Old manorial houses and farms are situated here, as well as vineyards that produce the wine known as Tacoronte-Acentejo.

The TF-5 motorway passes through the municipality. The Tenerife North Airport is 4 km to the east.

Tacoronte is a toponym of Guanche origin, believed to be derived from Tagoror, meaning "place where the Council of Elders meets". Its territory constituted an ancient menceyato, as the Guanche kingdoms were known, ruled by the mencey Acaymo. After the Spanish conquest of Tenerife, the area was settled by the Portuguese Sebastián Machado, who founded the town of Tacoronte around the hermitage of Santa Catalina that he had built. The town grew during succeeding centuries and in 1911, Alfonso XIII of Spain granted the town the status of municipio.

== Notable people ==
- María Rosa Alonso (1909–2011), Spanish professor, philologist, essayist
- Lorenzo Javier Jorge (born 1984), kickboxer

== See also ==
- List of municipalities in Santa Cruz de Tenerife
