= Hospital Universitario de Canarias =

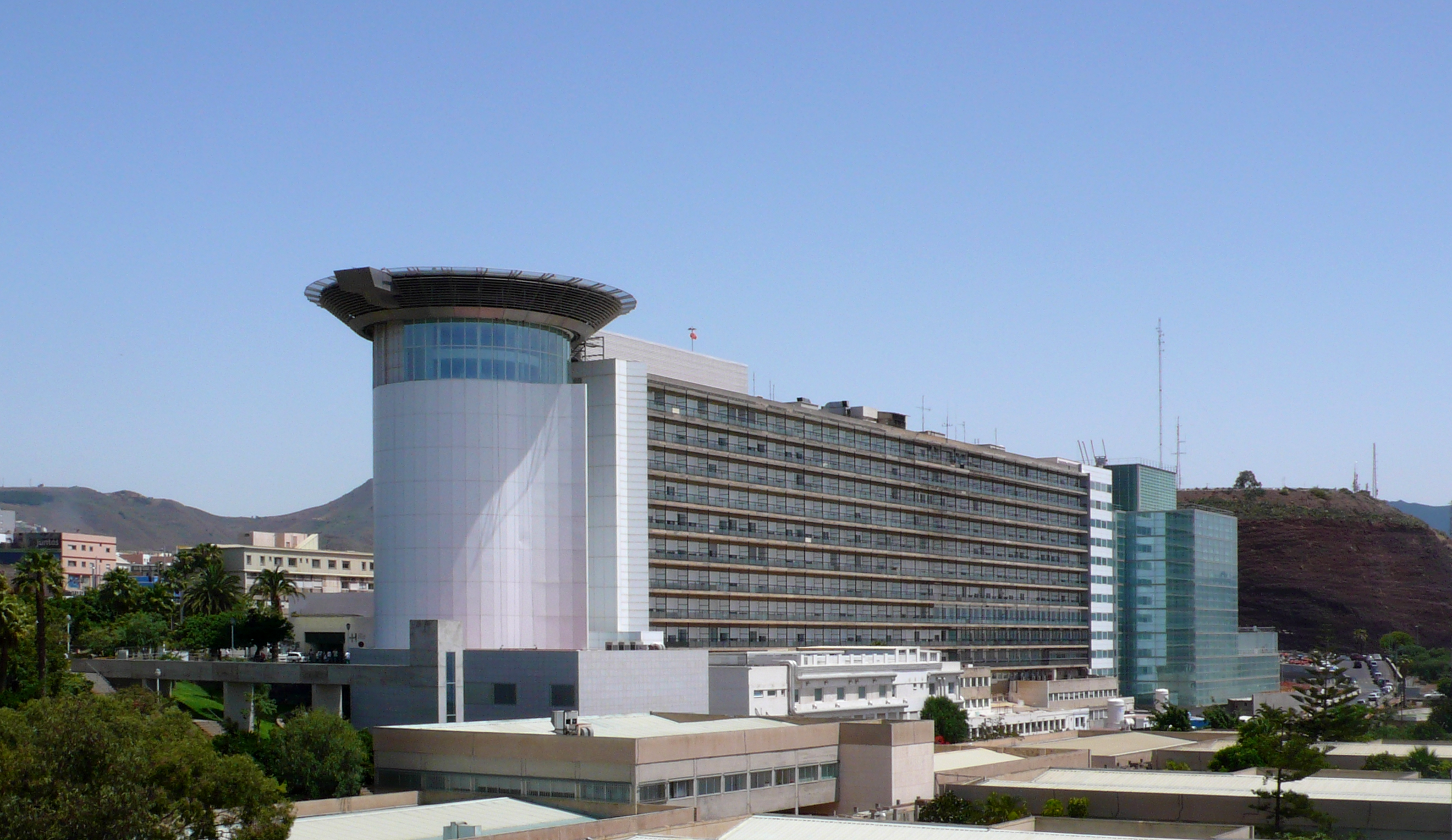

Geography
- Location: San Cristóbal de La Laguna, Tenerife, Spain
- Coordinates: 28°27′25″N 16°17′30″W

Organisation
- Affiliated university: Servicio Canario de Salud and Universidad de La Laguna

Services
- Beds: 655

History
- Founded: 1971

Links
- Lists: Hospitals in Spain
- Other links: List of hospitals in Spain

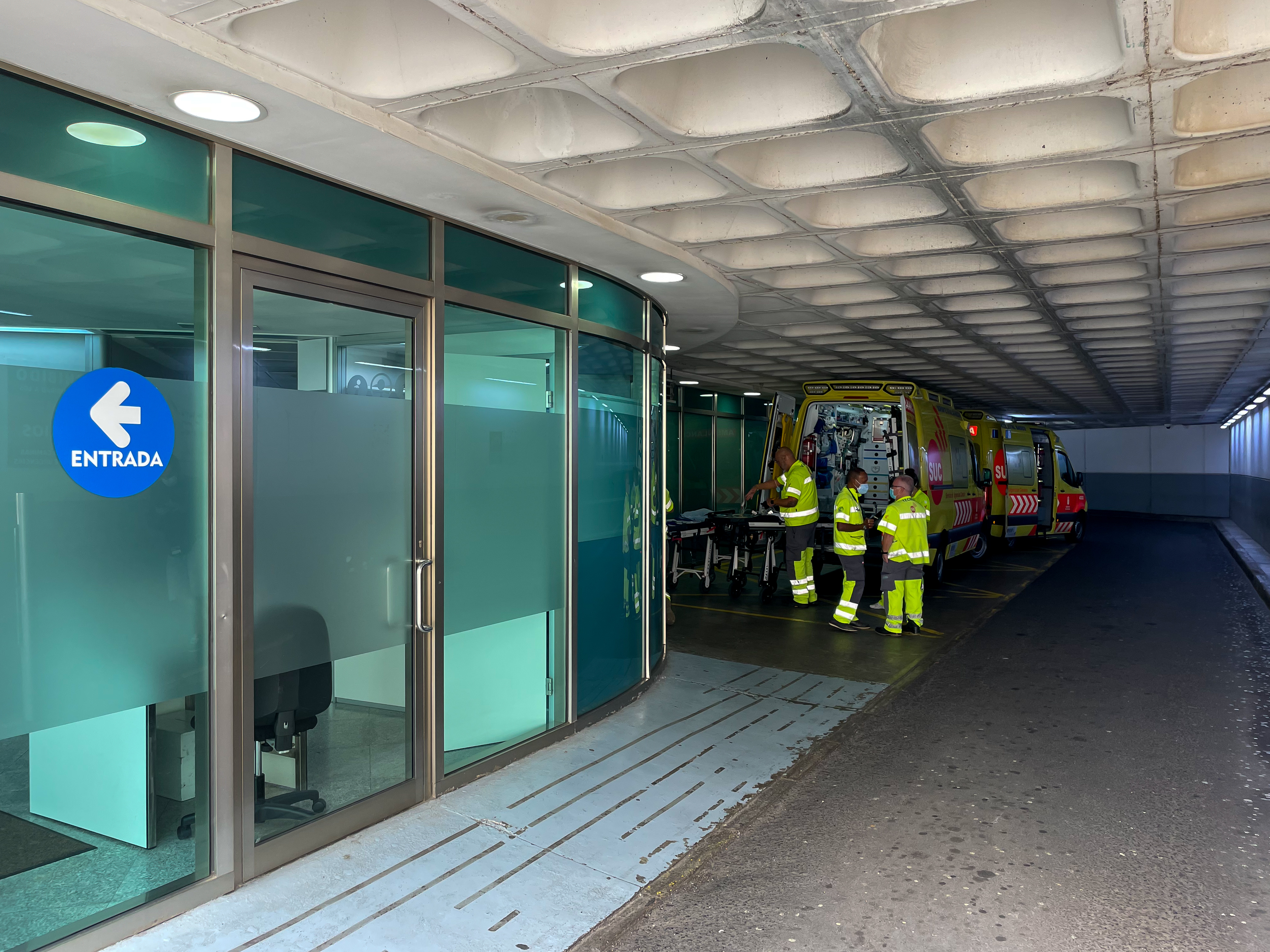
The Urgencias emergency entrance for the hospital

Hospital Universitario de Canarias or University Hospital of the Canary Islands is a teaching hospital of general scope located in the city of San Cristóbal de La Laguna, Tenerife, Canary Islands, Spain.

== Hospital ==
Affiliated with the education and research network of the University of La Laguna it is under the directive of the Servicio Canario de Salud (Canary Health Service). The hospital has specialist facilities which not only serve Tenerife but the surrounding Canary Islands.

It was founded in 1971 under the name of General and Clinical Hospital of Tenerife on a floor area of 71,000 m^{2} (760,000 sq ft) near the Autopista del Norte de Tenerife surface. With a total of 2,534 professionals it is geared to health care in the north of Tenerife, and referral hospital for the island of La Palma.

It is near the Hospital Universitario Nuestra Señora de Candelaria, a referral hospital in some specialties in Spain. The Hospital Universitario de Canarias was also the first hospital on the Canary Islands to hold the category of University Hospital, hence its name.
