= Autopista TF-5 =

Road in the Canary Islands

Coordinates: 28°27′31″N 16°27′02″W

Autopista TF-5
- Autopista del Norte de Tenerife

Route information
- Maintained by Regional government of the Canary Islands
- Length: 39.5 km (24.5 mi)

Major junctions
- From: Santa Cruz de Tenerife
- To: Puerto de la Cruz

Location
- Country: Spain
- Major cities: Santa Cruz de Tenerife, San Cristóbal de La Laguna Puerto de la Cruz, Tacoronte, La Orotava, Puerto de la Cruz, Los Realejos

Highway system
- Highways in Spain; Autopistas and autovías; National Roads

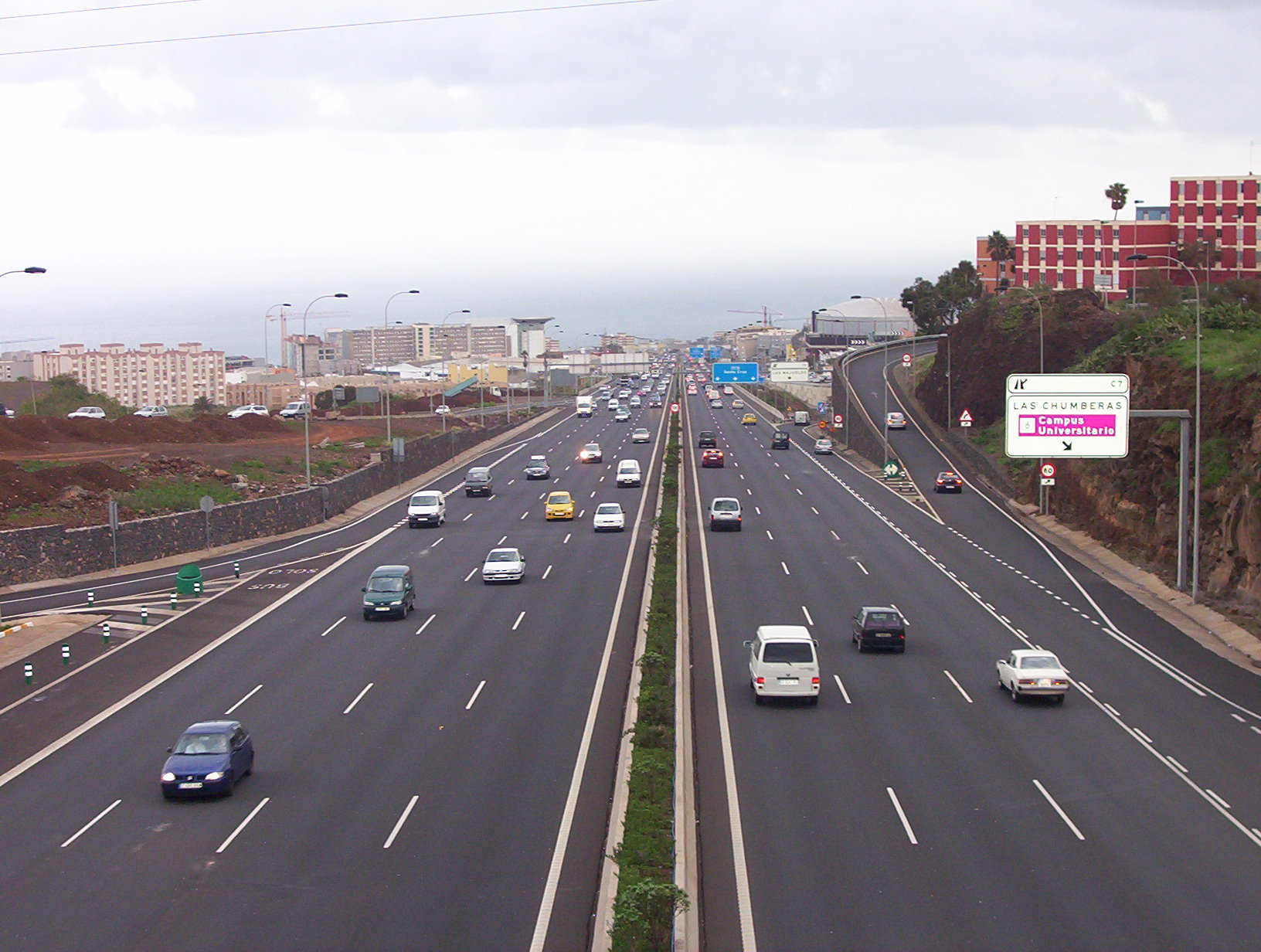
TF5 motorway approaching Santa Cruz

Autopista TF-5 is a motorway in the Canary Islands, in the north of Tenerife, running from Santa Cruz de Tenerife to Puerto de la Cruz. Most of the motorway is a Controlled-access highway or expressway, with some single carriageway remaining west of Puerto de la Cruz.

TF-5 begins in Santa Cruz de Tenerife with westbound traffic merging off from Av Tres de Mayo and ends with the motorway splitting between TF42 Motorway and TF82 Motorway in Puerto de la Cruz.

At present, it is the motorway that supports the highest traffic density in the Canary Islands, with stretches in which around 100,000 cars per day circulate.

== Exits ==
From Santa Cruz de Tenerife to Los Realejos TF5 has numbered exits.

Exit Number	Location	Notes
1	Santa Cruz de Tenerife	
3	Santa Cruz de Tenerife	
3A	Santa Cruz de Tenerife	
4	Santa Cruz de Tenerife	
4A	Santa Cruz de Tenerife	
5A	Santa Cruz de Tenerife	
5b	Santa Cruz de Tenerife	
5D	Santa Cruz de Tenerife	
6	Santa Cruz de Tenerife	
7B	Santa Cruz de Tenerife	
C7	Santa Cruz de Tenerife	
7A	Santa Cruz de Tenerife	
8A	Santa Cruz de Tenerife	
8B	San Cristobal de La Laguna	
10	San Cristobal de La Laguna	
11	San Cristobal de La Laguna	
14	Guamasa	
17	Tacoronte	
19	Tacoronte	
21	El Sauzal	
23	Puntillo del Sol	
27	Puntillo del Sol	
29	La Quinta	
31	Cantillo	
32	Puerto de la Cruz	
32	Puerto de la Cruz	
33	Puerto de la Cruz	
34	Puerto de la Cruz	
35	Puerto de la Cruz	
36	Puerto de la Cruz	
38	Puerto de la Cruz	
39	Los Realejos	Last exit
