= Galician Healthcare Service =

- Servizo Galego de Saúde (Sergas)
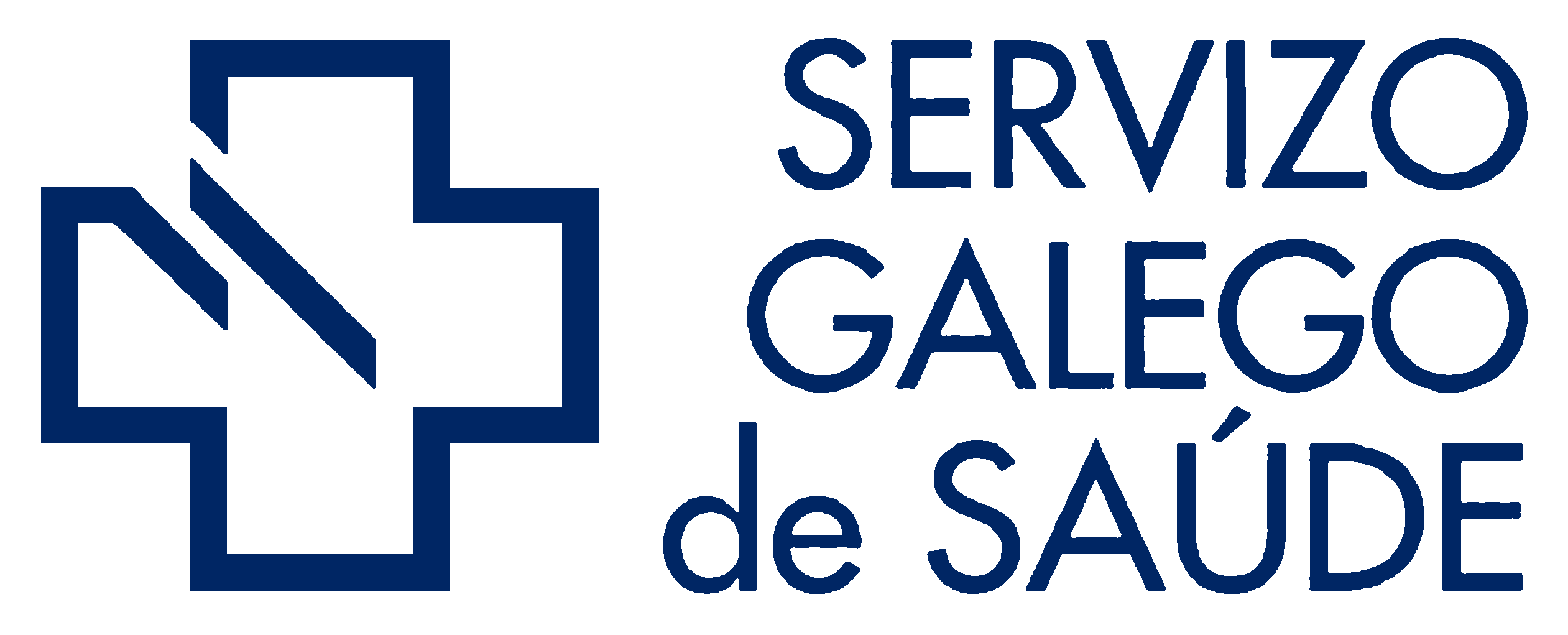

Health Care Service overview
- Formed: 1989
- Preceding Health Care Service: Instituto Nacional de la Salud (INSALUD)
- Type: Public Provider
- Jurisdiction: Xunta de Galicia
- Headquarters: Santiago de Compostela, Galicia
- Employees: 43,000
- Annual budget: €5.64 m EUR (2026)
- Minister responsible: Antonio Gómez Caamaño, Department Head for Health
- Health Care Service executive: Carmen Durán Parrondo, Director General
- Parent department: Department of Health
- Website: www.sergas.es

The Galician Healthcare Service (Galician: Servizo Galego de Saúde, Sergas) is the publicly funded healthcare system of Galicia, Spain.

Healthcare policy and management is the responsibility of the Consellería de Saúde, the Department of Health of the Galician regional government, the Xunta de Galicia. The current Department Head for Health (conselleiro) is Antonio Gómez Caamaño.
