= COVID-19 pandemic in Spain =

- Disease: COVID-19
- Pathogen: SARS-CoV-2
- Location: Spain
- First outbreak: Wuhan, Hubei, China
- Index case: La Gomera, Canary Islands
- Arrival date: 31 January 2020 (6 years, 9 months, 1 week and 6 days)
- Confirmed cases: 13,980,340
- Hospitalized cases: 230,392 (total); 5,663 (in last 7 days)
- Recovered: 150,376
- Deaths: 121,886
- Fatality rate: 0.87%

Government website
- sanidad.gob.es/nCov

The COVID-19 pandemic in Spain has resulted in 13,980,340 confirmed cases of COVID-19 and 121,886 deaths.

The virus was first confirmed to have spread to Spain on 31 January 2020, when a German tourist tested positive for SARS-CoV-2 in La Gomera, Canary Islands. Post-hoc genetic analysis has shown that at least 15 strains of the virus had been imported, and community transmission began by mid-February. By 13 March, cases had been confirmed in all 50 provinces of the country.

A lockdown was imposed on 14 March 2020. On 29 March, it was announced that, beginning the following day, all non-essential workers were ordered to remain at home for the next 14 days. By late March, the Community of Madrid has recorded the most cases and deaths in the country. Medical professionals and those who live in retirement homes have experienced especially high infection rates. On 25 March, the official death toll in Spain surpassed that of mainland China. On 2 April, 950 people died of the virus in a 24-hour period—at the time, the most by any country in a single day. On 17 May, the daily death toll announced by the Spanish government fell below 100 for the first time, and 1 June was the first day without deaths by COVID-19. The state of alarm ended on 21 June. However, the number of cases increased again in July in a number of cities including Barcelona, Zaragoza and Madrid, which led to reimposition of some restrictions but no national lockdown.

Studies have suggested that the number of infections and deaths may have been underestimated due to lack of testing and reporting, and many people with only mild or no symptoms were not tested. Reports in May suggested that, based on a sample of more than 63,000 people, the number of infections may be ten times higher than the number of confirmed cases by that date, and Madrid and several provinces of Castilla–La Mancha and Castile and León were the most affected areas with a percentage of infection greater than 10%. There may also be as many as 15,815 more deaths according to the Spanish Ministry of Health monitoring system on daily excess mortality (Sistema de Monitorización de la Mortalidad Diaria – MoMo). On 6 July 2020, the results of a Government of Spain nationwide seroprevalence study showed that about two million people, or 5.2% of the population, could have been infected during the pandemic. Spain was the second country in Europe (behind Russia) to record half a million cases. On 21 October, Spain passed 1 million COVID-19 cases, with 1,005,295 infections and 34,366 deaths reported, a third of which occurred in Madrid.

As of September 2021, Spain is one of the countries with the highest percentage of its population vaccinated (76% fully vaccinated and 79% with the first dose), while also being one of the countries more in favor of vaccines against COVID-19 (nearly 94% of its population is already vaccinated or wants to be).

As of 4 February 2023, a total of 112,304,453 vaccine doses have been administered.

== Background ==
On 12 January, the World Health Organization (WHO) confirmed that a novel coronavirus was the cause of a respiratory illness in a cluster of people in Wuhan, Hubei, China, who had initially come to the attention of the WHO on 31 December 2019.

== Timeline ==
=== First cases (31 January – 25 February) ===
On 31 January 2020, Spain confirmed its first COVID-19 case in La Gomera, Canary Islands. A tourist from Germany tested positive and was admitted to University Hospital of the Nuestra Señora de Candelaria. On 9 February, the second case involved a male British tourist in Palma de Mallorca, Balearic Islands, who contracted the disease after coming into contact with someone in France who subsequently tested positive. On 9 February, Fernando Simón, the head of medical emergencies in Madrid, said "Spain will only have a handful of cases." On 13 February, the first death in Spain was recorded involving a 69-year-old man who had been in Nepal. He died in Valencia and was diagnosed post-mortem. On 24 February, following a COVID-19 outbreak in Italy, a medical doctor from Lombardy, Italy, who was on holiday in Tenerife, tested positive at the University Hospital of the Nuestra Señora de Candelaria in Spain. The H10 Costa Adeje Palace in Tenerife was put on lockdown.

Following these early developments, by 24 February parliamentary opposition, Vox in particular, called for travel restrictions between China and Spain, and Italy and Spain. The idea was rejected and criticised by the Government as alarmist and xenophobic.

On 25 February, four new cases related to the Italian cluster were confirmed in Spain. In Canary Islands, the wife of the medical doctor from Lombardy, who was on holiday in Tenerife, tested positive. In Catalonia, a 36-year-old Italian woman living in Spain, who visited Bergamo and Milan from 12 to 22 February, also tested positive in Barcelona. A 24-year-old man from Madrid, who recently returned from Northern Italy, tested positive and was admitted to Hospital Carlos III. In the Valencian Community, a man from Villarreal, who recently travelled to Milan, tested positive and was admitted to Hospital Universitario De La Plana, Castellón.

A retrospective analysis of 28 complete genetic sequences of the virus showed that by 14–18 February at least two different strains were already circulating in Spain, which means there were multiple introductions of the virus to Spain and not a single patient zero.

=== Community transmission (26 February – 12 March) ===
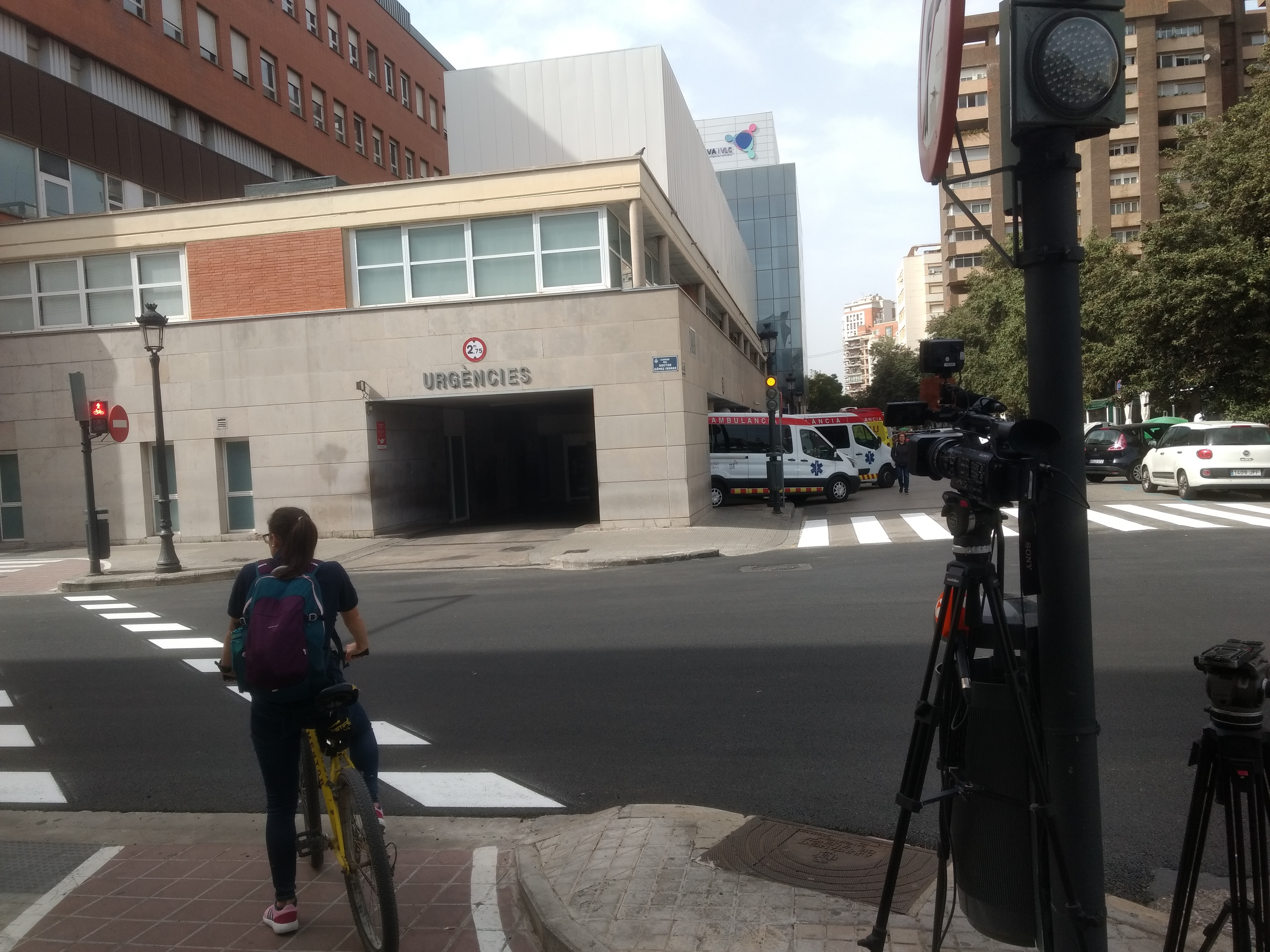
On 28 February, television cameras covered the first coronavirus cases at Hospital Clínico Universitario de Valencia.

On 26 February, the first reported case in Andalusia was confirmed in Seville, the first case of community transmission reported in Spain. The next day, eight cases of Italian origin and one from Iran were reported, in Catalonia, Castile and León, and Valencia. On 28 February, nine more people tested positive in Andalusia and a fifth case was confirmed in Madrid. On 29 February, Asturias and Navarre reported their first cases, one each. On 1 March, in Andalusia, two doctors were confirmed as infected, increasing the number of Andalusian cases to 12. In the Basque Country another four cases were reported, from other parts of Spain. In Castilla–La Mancha the first case of coronavirus was confirmed, and Extremadura announced the first four cases. On 2 March in Cantabria, nine new cases originating from people who travelled to Italy increased the total cases there 10 cases in the community. In Castile and León five new cases in one day brought the total to eight people affected by coronavirus in the region. Catalonia reported three more positive cases, all related to travel from Italy. There were two new positives in Extremadura, bringing the total to 6. Madrid reported that its total had increased to 29. In La Rioja, the first case was confirmed.

On 3 March, the second and third cases in Asturias were reported. In the Balearic Islands a third positive case was confirmed. In the Basque Country three more positives, two in Álava, and the first one in Biscay, raised the total positives to 13 for the region. In Castilla–La Mancha there were four new cases reported, bringing the total up to seven, two in the province of Guadalajara and another two in the province of Toledo. In the Community of Madrid 27 new positive cases of coronavirus brought the total up to 56, with five serious in intensive care. In La Rioja the second case of coronavirus was confirmed. In the Valencian Community, four new cases were confirmed, bringing the number of infected to 19 cases. The first death in Madrid took place on 3 March but was not confirmed until 5 March.

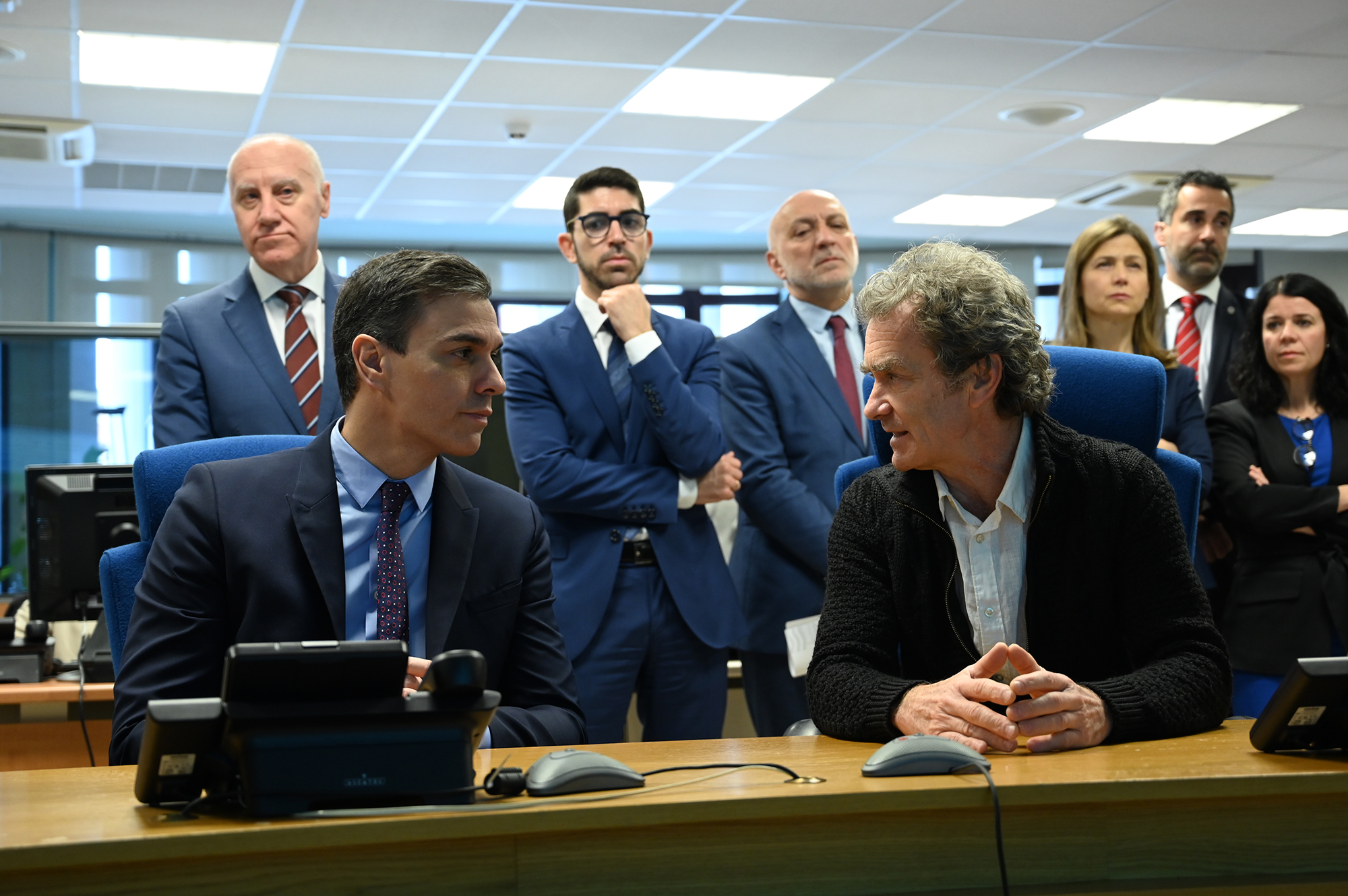
On 4 March, Prime Minister Pedro Sánchez visited the Coordination Centre for Health Alerts and Emergencies (es).

On 8 March, around 120,000 people participated in an International Women's Day march in Madrid and some 60,000 football fans filled one of the city's largest stadiums. Parliamentary opposition speculates that the will to allow for the International Women's Day celebration was one of the primary reasons for the Government to downplay the danger, and delay pandemic response until later.

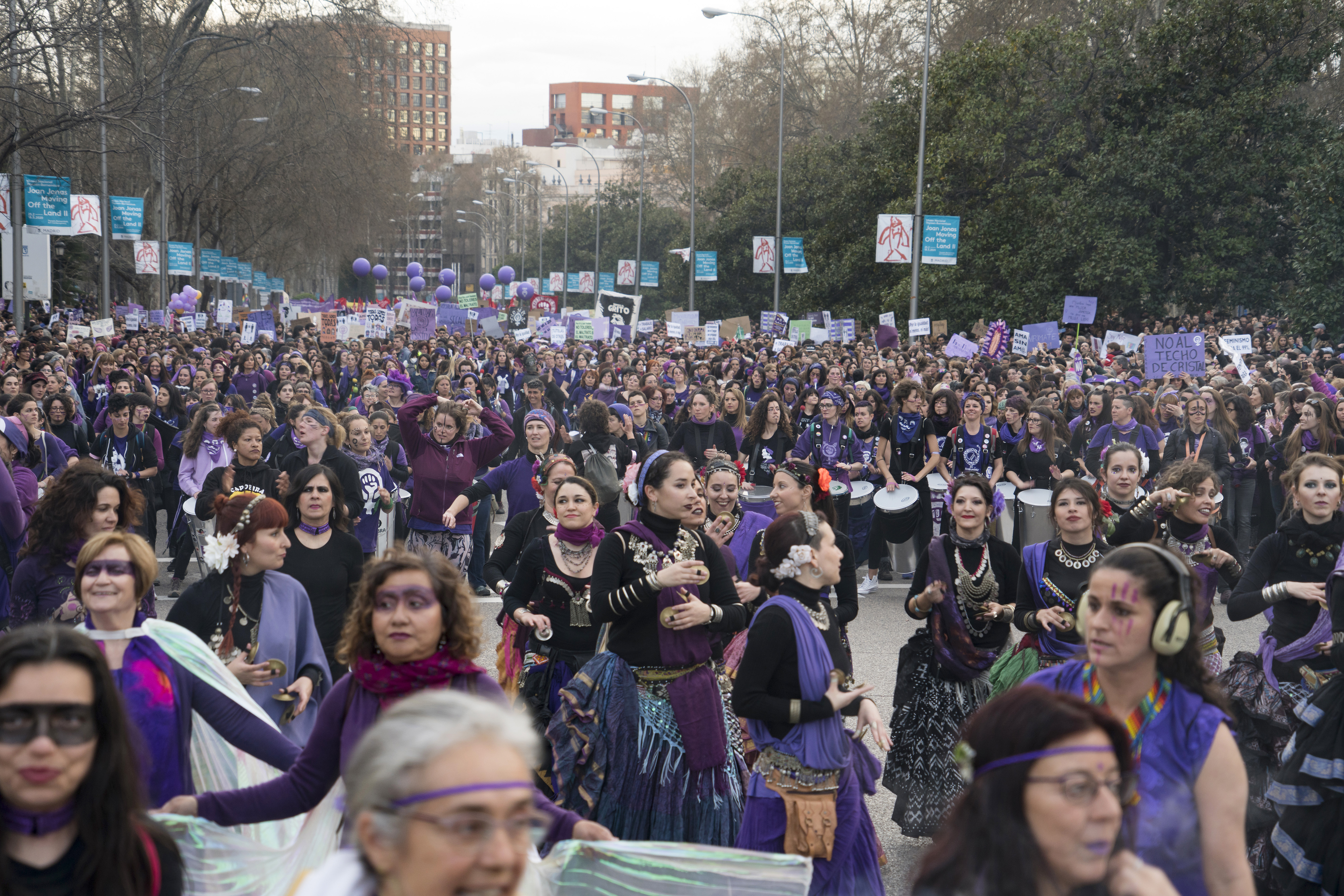
International Women's Day march in Madrid, 8 March 2020

On 9 March, the Catalan regional government suspended events with more than one thousand attendees under its jurisdiction. The first death in Extremadura was reported. On 12 March, most of the autonomous communities shut down their school systems, leaving more than ten million students (a million in university and nine million in primary and secondary education) at home, initially for two weeks. Two cases of the virus are confirmed in the autonomous city of Melilla, while the first two cases reported in the island of La Palma. Spain's stock index, IBEX 35, fell 14%, in the highest drop in history for one day.

=== State of alarm (13–27 March) ===
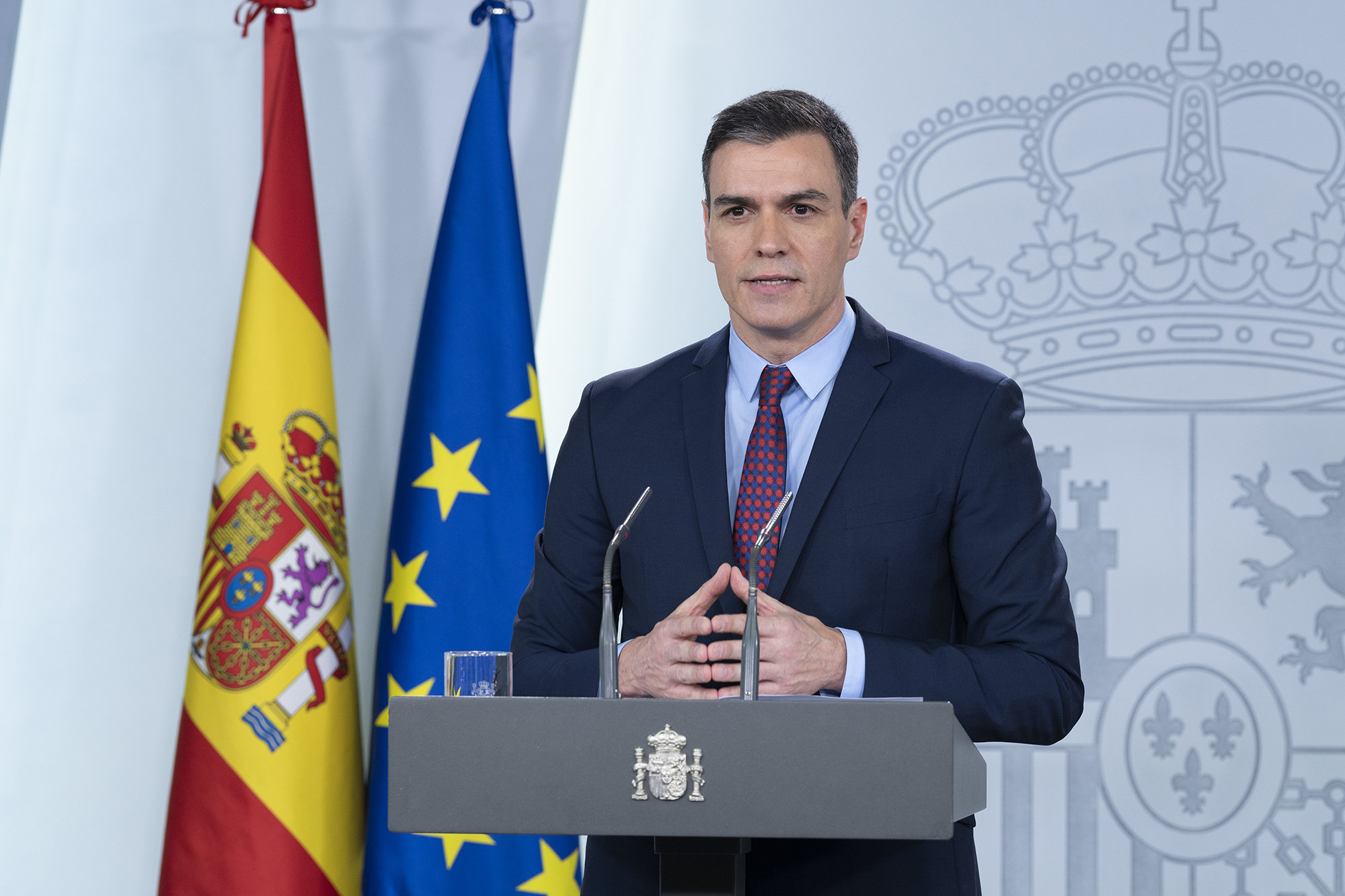
Spanish Prime Minister Pedro Sánchez announces the State of Alarm nationwide

On 13 March, Prime Minister of Spain Pedro Sánchez announced a declaration of a nationwide State of Alarm for 15 days, to become effective the following day after the approval of the Council of Ministers. The president of the Audiencia Nacional announced the suspension of all the ordinary functions of this Court for 15 days, keeping only the urgent proceedings and the court on duty. Judicial activity in the Community of Madrid, Basque Country, Igualada and Haro were suspended by an order of the General Council of the Judiciary. Vicepresident of Castile and León, Francisco Igea, announced the suspension of the Holy Week festivities in the region after talks with the regional administration. All provinces of Spain confirmed at least one positive after cases are confirmed in Ávila, Cuenca, Huesca, Palencia and Soria, leaving the Autonomous City of Ceuta and the islands of El Hierro and Formentera as the only territories without cases reported. Catalonia reported 190 new cases in the highest rise in cases in a day. The first two cases were reported in the autonomous city of Melilla.

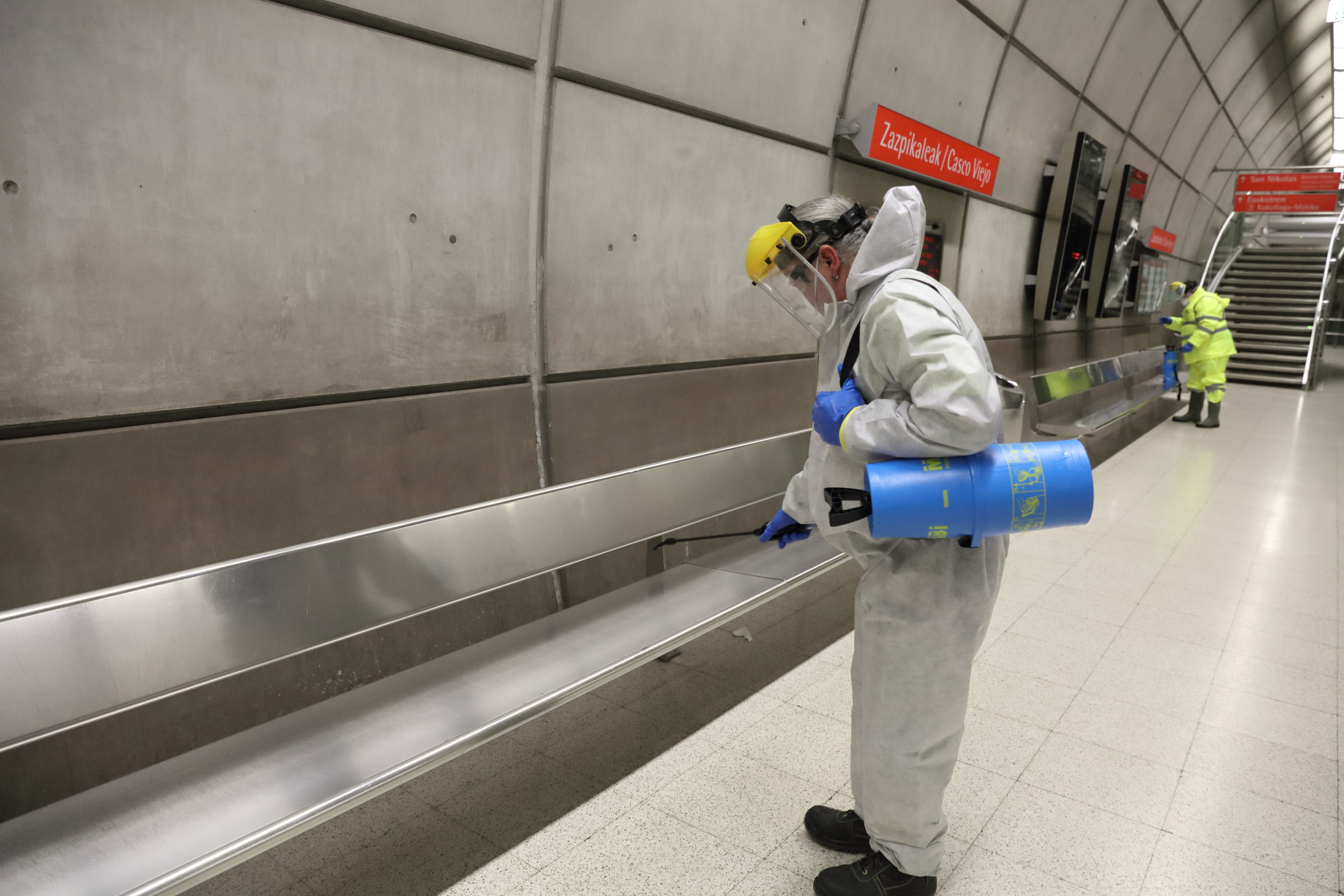
Disinfection of the metro in Bilbao, Basque Country, 21 March

On 15 March the national lockdown due to the State of Alarm becomes effective. All residents are mandated to remain in their normal residences except to purchase food and medicines, work or attend emergencies. This suppression of the freedom of movement was later (in July 2021) declared unconstitutional under the State of Alarm by the Constitutional Court of Spain in response to the appeal by Vox (submitted in April 2020). Lockdown restrictions also mandated the temporary closure of non-essential shops and businesses, including bars, restaurants, cafes, cinemas and commercial and retail businesses, while also announcing that the government will be able to take over private healthcare providers, if needed. The announcement came following significant increases in the number of confirmed cases of COVID-19 in Spain, increasing by 66% from 3,146 cases to 5,232 cases on 13 March 2020. The "extraordinary decision", according to the PM Pedro Sánchez, is necessary as Spain deals with a "health, social and economic crisis". Seville's Seville Fair is postponed to September for the first time in its history. The first case in the autonomous city of Ceuta was diagnosed.

On 17 March, PM Pedro Sánchez announces a support package of more than 200 billion euros, almost 20% of the Spanish GDP, to cushion the impact of the coronavirus crisis. The Royal Decree approved by his government also includes a moratorium on the payment of mortgages for workers and self-employed in economic vulnerability and for those affected by COVID-19, as well as the streamlining of temporary dismissal files (known as ERTE), support for workers and companies affected by downturns, measures to guarantee the liquidity of companies and to promote research to achieve a vaccine. The first death in the province of Tarragona is confirmed in Valls hospital, an 88-year-old woman from Badalona.

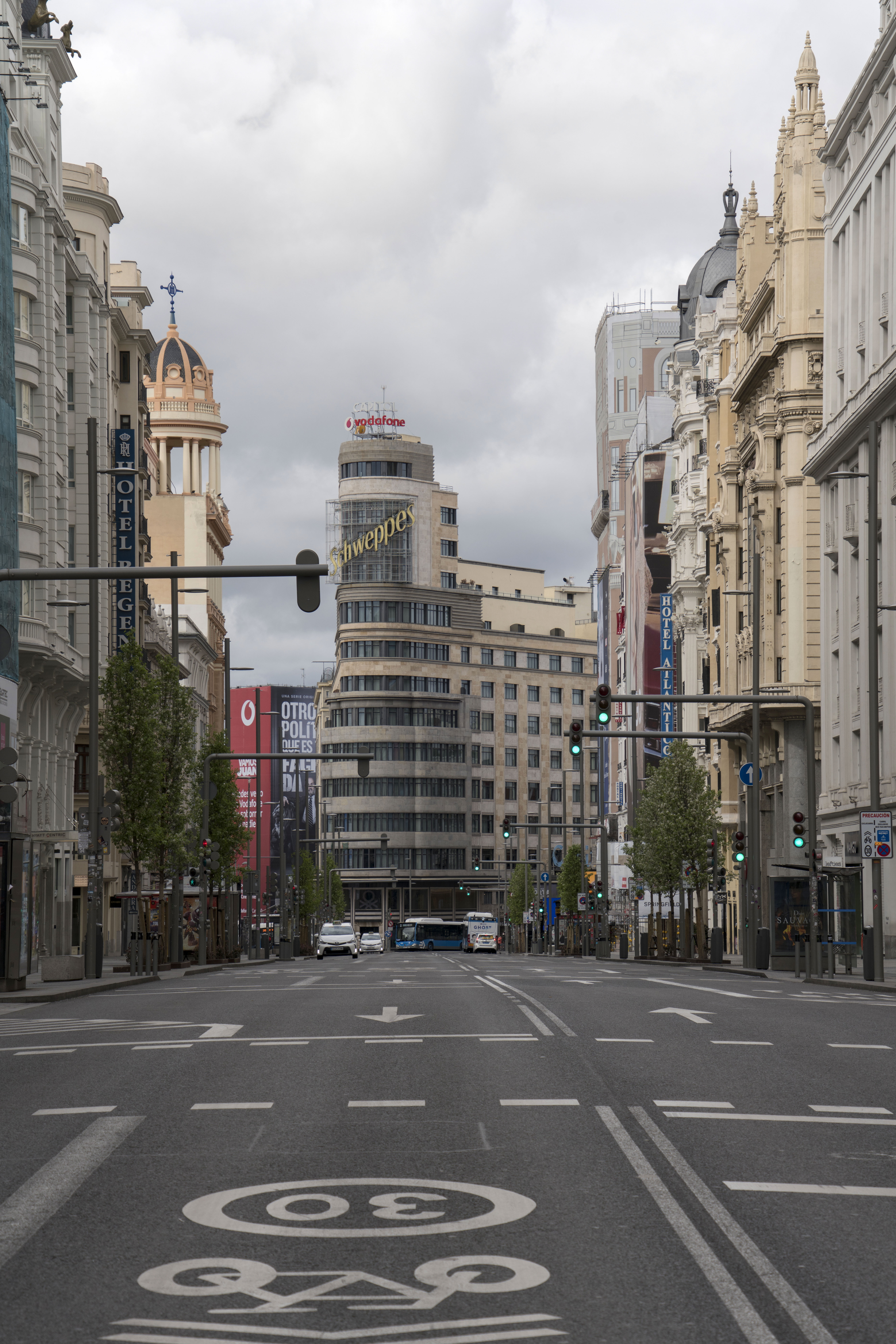
The Gran Vía of Madrid on 22 March

On 19 March, the first death of a healthcare worker in the country is reported, a nurse from the Basque Country. On 20 March, Spain exceeds 1,000 deaths. The first case is confirmed on the island of El Hierro. On 21 March, the Ministry of Health announces the purchase of 640,000 rapid tests and reports that more than 350,000 tests for COVID-19 had been conducted. On 22 March, Spanish PM Pedro Sánchez announces that he will take the petition to extend the State of Alarm in the nation until 11 April to the Congress after consultations with regional presidents. The President of the Region of Murcia orders the cessation of all non-essential economic activities, a decision later revoked by the central government. On 23 March, the Spanish Army found elderly people abandoned and dead inside retirement homes, according to Defence Minister Margarita Robles. A criminal investigation is launched. The "Palacio del Hielo", an ice rink in Madrid, begins to be used as a morgue. By this date, 5,400 medical professionals are confirmed to have tested positive for coronavirus and sent home, further straining the hospitals, where a lack of protective equipment has put workers at risk.

=== Halting of all non-essential activity (28 March – 12 April) ===
Number of cases (blue) and number of deaths (red) on a logarithmic scale

Police cars playing motivational music for confined neighbours in the streets of Miranda de Ebro, Burgos, Castile and León

On 28 March, the Spanish government banned all non-essential activity, providing affected workers with paid recoverable leave unless they provide an essential service, work remotely, are on sick leave, or have their contracts suspended. The next day, two cases of coronavirus were diagnosed on Formentera, Balearic Islands, leaving the island of La Graciosa (Canary Islands) as the only territory with no cases detected. On 30 March, Fernando Simón, the head of Spain's Centre for Health Emergencies and the public face of the government's response because of his daily briefings, tested positive for the virus and temporarily resigned. On 4 April, Prime Minister Pedro Sánchez asked the Congress of Deputies to extend the State of Alarm for another two weeks, until 26 April, a request that was granted on 9 April.

From 3 to 11 April, the number of new cases and deaths in general had a decreasing trend. On 3 April, 950 deaths were reported, the highest number for a single country over a 24-hour interval, on the same day, estimates for the basic reproduction number of the virus indicated a number below 1.0 for the first time, meaning that each case was, on average, infecting less than one other person. On 4, 5, and 6 April, consecutive decreases in number of new cases and deaths were reported, including 637 new deaths on 6 April, the lowest figure in ten days. On 10 April, the number of confirmed deaths dropped to 605, and then on 11 April to 510, the lowest figure in more than a month; the number of confirmed cases increased by only 3%, the lowest amount since the Ministry of Health began collecting data.

=== Lifting of some restrictions (13 April – 1 May) ===
On 13 April, workers in some non-essential sectors, such as construction and industry, who cannot work remotely were allowed to return to work; the government began the distribution of millions of face masks in public transportation hubs. On 21 April, the government announced that from 26 or 27 April children under the age of 14 will be able to go out on short walks with their parents or other adults living in the same household. On 23 April, the state of alarm was extended until 9 May, with further extensions envisioned.

=== De-escalation (2 May–July) ===
On 28 April, the government announced a plan for easing lockdown restrictions. The plan has four phases, numbered 0 through 3, and each of the phases 1 through 3 will last at least two weeks. The transition from one phase to the next will be based on public health indicators such as number of cases and capacity of the healthcare system. Phase 0 allowed people out of their homes for short walks and individual sports from 2 May

Phase 1 began on 11 May in 26 provinces and territories comprising about half of the Spanish population. It includes the opening of small shops, of terraces at 50% capacity, and of places of worship at one-third capacity. The plan was estimated to have a duration of eight weeks if there were no setbacks.

Preliminary results from a large-scale serologic study, made public on 13 May, suggested that about 5% of the population of Spain had developed antibodies for SARS-CoV-2. The percentage was higher than 11% in the provinces of Soria (14.2), Cuenca (13.5), Segovia (12.6), Albacete (11.6), Madrid (11.3) and Ciudad Real (11.1), but still substantially below the 60% suggested to be needed to achieve herd immunity. On 4 June and 6 July, the results of the second and third wave of the nationwide seroprevalence study showed the percentage of population infected to have slightly increased, reaching 5.2%. According to this study based on sample of more than 63,000 people, Madrid and several provinces of Castilla–La Mancha and Castile and León would be the most affected areas with a percentage of infection greater than 10%On 6 July 2020, the results of the third and last wave of a Government of Spain nationwide seroprevalence study showed that about two million people, or 5.2% of the population, could have been infected during the pandemic, confirming the data from previous waves.

Phase 2 began on 18 May in some Balearic Islands; at the same time, the remaining of Andalusia and the Valencian Community, as well as some territories in Castile and León and in Catalonia joined phase 1. As of 25 May 2020, 47% of the territory of Spain was on phase 2. As of 8 June 2020, 48% of the country was on phase 2 and 52% on phase 3; the latter includes less stringent restrictions for the opening of shops, hotels, bars, entertainment and nightlife venues. As of 15 June 2020, 75% of the Spanish population was on phase 3 and several provinces entered the "new normality" phase.

The state of alarm expired at midnight of Sunday 21 June, and Spain entered a "new normality" phase, in which restrictions such as maximum occupancy in shops are handled by each autonomous community independently. At the state level, the government maintained the obligation to wear masks in public transportation and all other places where a minimum distance of 1.5 metres cannot be maintained; the government also opened all internal borders among autonomous communities as well as the land border with France, and resumed international flights with other European Union countries and the United Kingdom.

=== Resurgence (17 July – October) ===
On 17 July, in response to an increase in the number of cases in the Barcelona metropolitan area, the government of Catalonia forbade gatherings of more than 10 people in public or private spaces, and advised residents to stay at home unless strictly necessary. The government of Aragon issued a similar advisory notice to residents, in response to an increase in the number of cases in Zaragoza.

The number of cases also increased again in July in other cities such as Madrid. Various European countries imposed restrictions on travellers from Aragon, Catalonia, and Navarre. On 7 August, Spain overtook the United Kingdom in the total number of cases reported, which at 309,855 cases was the highest in Western Europe. A number of restrictions were imposed, including closing nightclubs, banning smoking outdoors if social distancing was not possible, and compulsory wearing of face masks in public.

The country recorded a series of high daily counts of infection since relaxing its restrictions in June 2020, with 3,715 cases reported on 19 August, giving it a cumulative figure of over 370,000 cases by that date. The country had the highest rate of infection in Europe, with 145 new cases per 100,000 population in the two weeks before 21 August 2020, compared to 51 in France and 21 in the UK. Aragon was the worst-hit region. Officials have blamed socialising by young people for the increase. The numbers of deaths and hospitalisations in August, however, remained relatively low compared to March and April, for example 122 died from COVID-19 on 20 August compared to 950 on 2 April.

On 4 September, the country reported a new record of 10,476 new cases in a day. On 7 September 2020, the number of cases reported reached over half a million, the second country in Europe to reach this milestone after Russia. There were 525,549 infections in total, a third of them in Madrid, with 29,516 deaths reported.

=== State of emergency reimposed (1 October – 9 May) ===
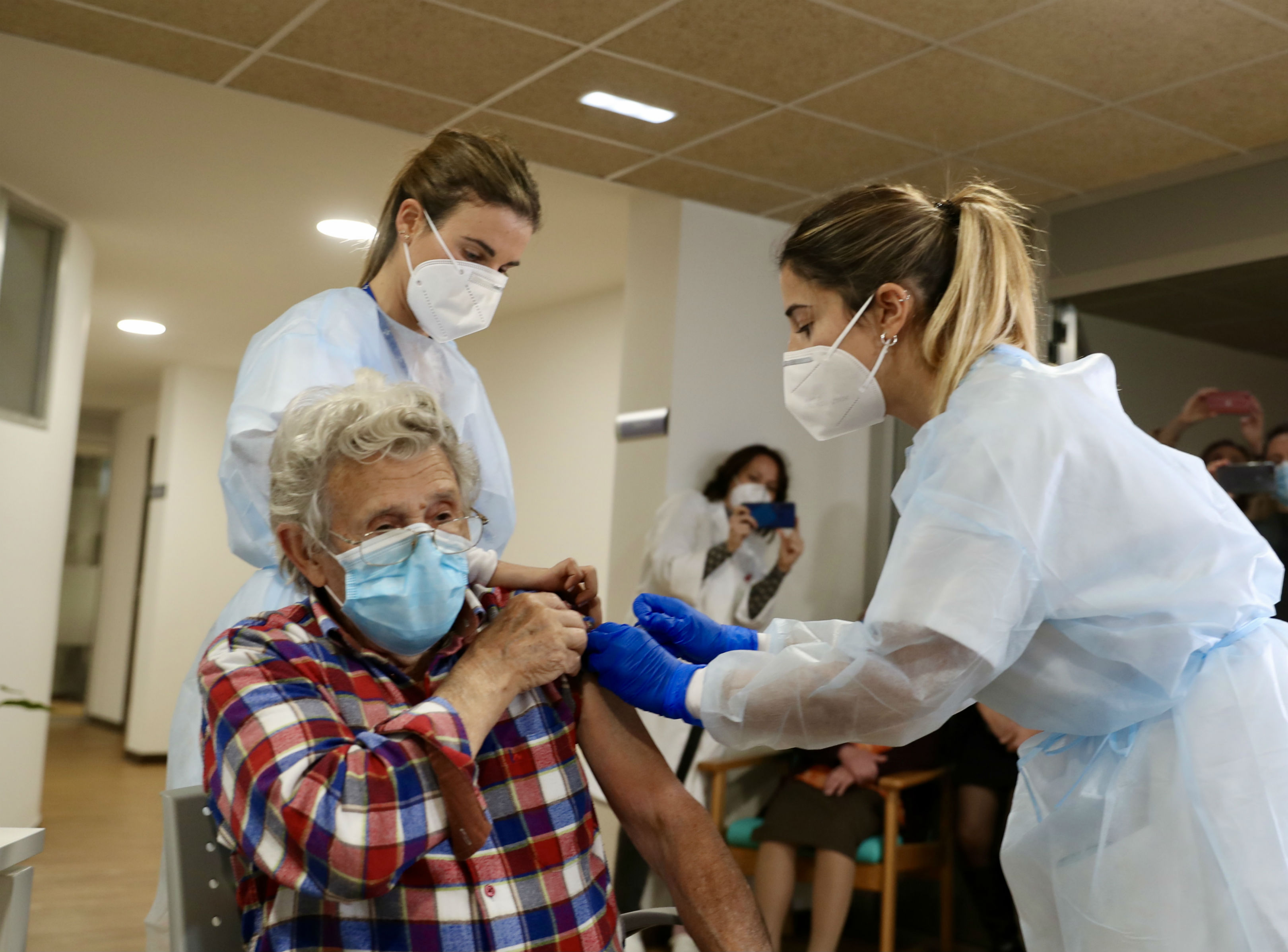
First day of vaccination against COVID-19 in Spain

The government ordered a partial lockdown of Madrid on 1 October due to the rise in cases.

On 21 October, Spain passed 1 million COVID-19 cases, the first country in Western Europe to do so.

On 25 October, the government reimposed a state of emergency across the country and introduced a national curfew to counter the resurgence in coronavirus. Local authorities were also given powers to ban travel across different regions. The curfew was initially set to last 15 days, but Pedro Sánchez said that he would ask Parliament to extend it if necessary.

On 23 November, the Spanish King Felipe VI went into self-isolation after coming into contact with a patient who tested positive for COVID-19.

On 27 December, the first vaccines started being administered to the Spanish population.

On 3 May, Spain managed to achieve the government's objective of having at least 5 million people fully vaccinated for the first week of May, more than 10% of the total population.

On 9 May, the State of emergency came to an end as Prime Minister Sánchez refused to prolong it any more, claiming that now it was the turn to trust "massive vaccination".

== Government response ==
=== Quarantines and lockdowns ===
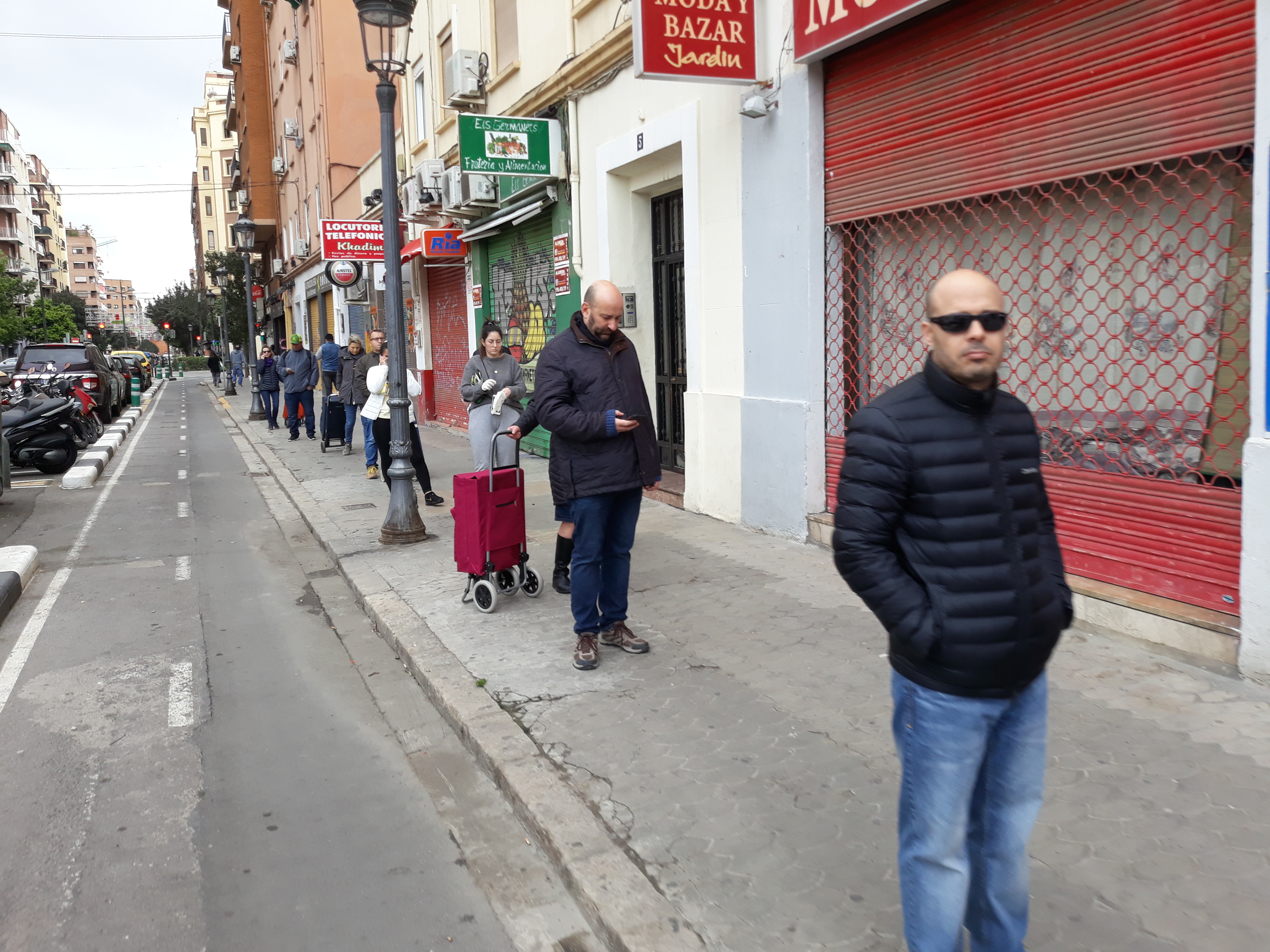
Residents of Valencia, maintaining social distancing while queueing (20 March 2020)

On 7 March, Haro was put on lockdown due to a concentration of cases. On 12 March, the Catalan regional government quarantined four Catalan municipalities—Igualada, Vilanova del Camí, Santa Margarida de Montbui and Òdena—following a cluster of cases being reported at Igualada Hospital; the measure affected 70,000 people and was scheduled to last 14 days. The next day, the Government of Spain announced a state of alarm over all of the country would be decreed on the next day, initially for 15 days as specified in the Article 116.2 of the Spanish constitution. Since the Real Decreto 463/2020 was approved on 14 March, gender inequalities have been increased in the domestic and private sphere due to the measures adopted by the government. Under the state of alarm, the central government retains all powers and all police are under the control of the Interior Ministry. Many nonessential activities are forbidden, including large gatherings, restaurants, museums and the like. However, citizens are still permitted to travel to work and buy essential items, and religious services are allowed under certain conditions. In retrospective it was decided by the Constitutional Court of Spain that citizen movement restrictions amounted to the suppression of freedom of movement which was unconstitutional under the State of Alarm. The delay in implementing the lockdown meant some people in Madrid left for the regions, bringing the virus with them.

Some autonomous communities announced emergency measures on the same day. The Basque Country announced a declaration of sanitary emergency in the region, which allows population confinement. The government of Murcia announced the confinement of more than 500,000 people in coastal municipalities. President of the Balearic Islands, Francina Armengol, asked the Prime Minister to suspend traffic between the mainland and the islands. President of Catalonia, Quim Torra, asked the Prime Minister to authorise the closure of all Catalonia's ports, airports and railways. Mayor of Madrid, José Luis Martínez Almeida, ordered the closure of bars and terraces in the capital, and announced that his government is prepared, if needed, to isolate the city. In Extremadura, Arroyo de la Luz was put on lockdown.

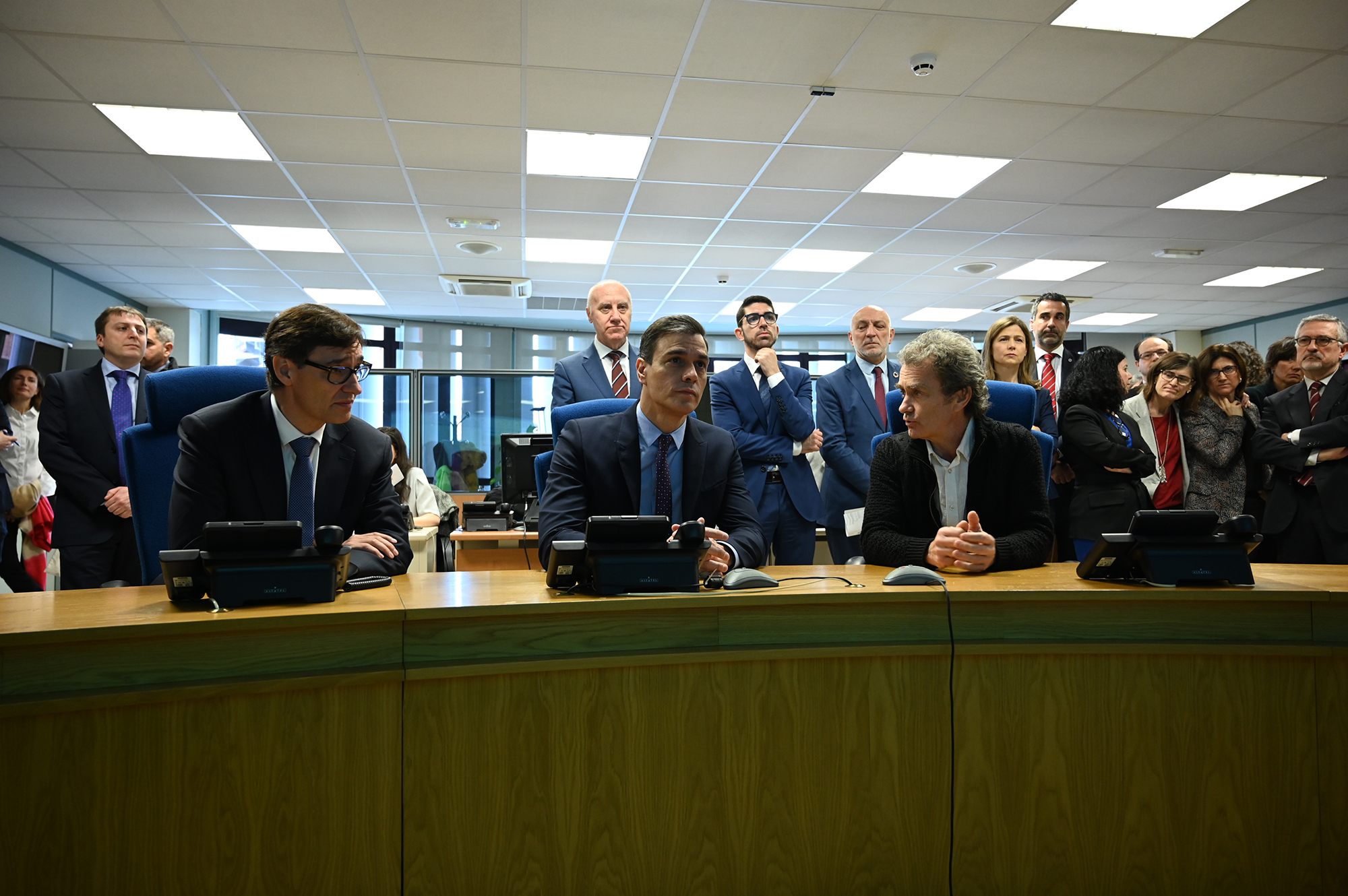
Prime Minister Pedro Sánchez with Health Minister Salvador Illa and Spain's health emergency chief Fernando Simón

On 25 March, the parliament—with less than 50 members of 350 present—approved the government's request to extend of the state of alarm until 11 April. On 28 March, the prime minister ordered all non-essential workers to stay home from 30 March to 9 April to bend the curve and contain the epidemic. Fernando Simón said ICUs were expected to be full by the end of this week or early the next week. On 1 April, the state of alarm was scheduled to expire on 12 April and the government planned to ease lockdowns going forward, assuming new infections decrease. Because the previous week had seen many Spaniards die of the disease, on 3 April, Sánchez was considering extending the quarantine another fifteen days to 26 April. He consulted the opposition to obtain its support, and will speak to presidents of the autonomous communities on 5 April. On 13 April, some nonessential workers who are unable to conduct remote work were allowed to return to the office, although other social distancing measures remained in place. Instead, the government distributed masks on public transport and attempted aggressive contact tracing to reduce the spread of the virus.

Likewise, many feminist organizations warned about the increase in male violence during the lockdown, when female victims of gender-based violence must live with their aggressor. In fact, according to available data, from 14 to 29 March 2020 calls to 016 (a Spanish number to help those women who suffer this kind of violence) increased by 12.43% and online consultations by 269.57% compared to the same period in the previous year. This situation also had an impact on violence against children, since in the week of 23–30 March 2020, the anonymous and confidential chat of the ANAR Foundation received 270 requests for help, 173 of which correspond to cases of serious abuse; that is, 24 cases per day in Spain.

=== Travel restrictions ===
On 10 March 2020, the Government of Spain decreed the immediate cancellation of all direct flights from Italy to Spain until 25 March. On 12 March, all traffic between Morocco and Spain was suspended. On 16 March, Minister of the Interior Grande-Marlaska announces the closing of Spanish frontiers to be in effect from 12:00 pm on 16 March, authorising the entry of only Spanish citizens and those who can prove cause of force majeure or a situation of need. The entry restrictions will have no effect on the transport of merchandise to guarantee the supply chain. It will not affect foreign diplomatic personnel either. Following this, President of the Government of the Balearic Islands, Francina Armengol, would announce that after receiving the approval of the Spanish government, her government will proceed to the closure of all airports and ports in the region, with "a few exceptions".; the Canary Islands would restrict flights between the peninsula and its islands. Air and sea connections to The Balearic Islands cease due to flight companies stopping all flights. Movement between provinces will be forbidden at least until the end of June.

=== Closures ===
On 10 March, the Ministry of Culture ordered the closing of its buildings in Madrid, including the museums of El Prado, Reina Sofía, Thyssen, the Spanish Filmoteca Española, Archaeological and Anthropological museums, as well as the National Library and the Royal Palace among others. The Constitutional Court suspended its activity for two days, and the Royal Spanish Academy suspended its plenary sessions. On 12 March, the Spanish Cortes Generales suspended their activity for 15 days and the Ministry of the Interior ordered the isolation of its 69 jails. The Sagrada Família, in Barcelona, closes for tourists and construction workers. On 13 March 2020 the Government of the Community of Madrid decreed the shutting down of bars, restaurants and "non-alimentary" shops (only allowing the opening of supermarkets and chemist's shops). On 14 March, Asturias, Catalonia, Cantabria, Galicia, Madrid, Murcia and the Basque Country closed all shops except those selling food and basic necessities. The Mayor of Madrid closed parks and public gardens.

=== Enforcement ===
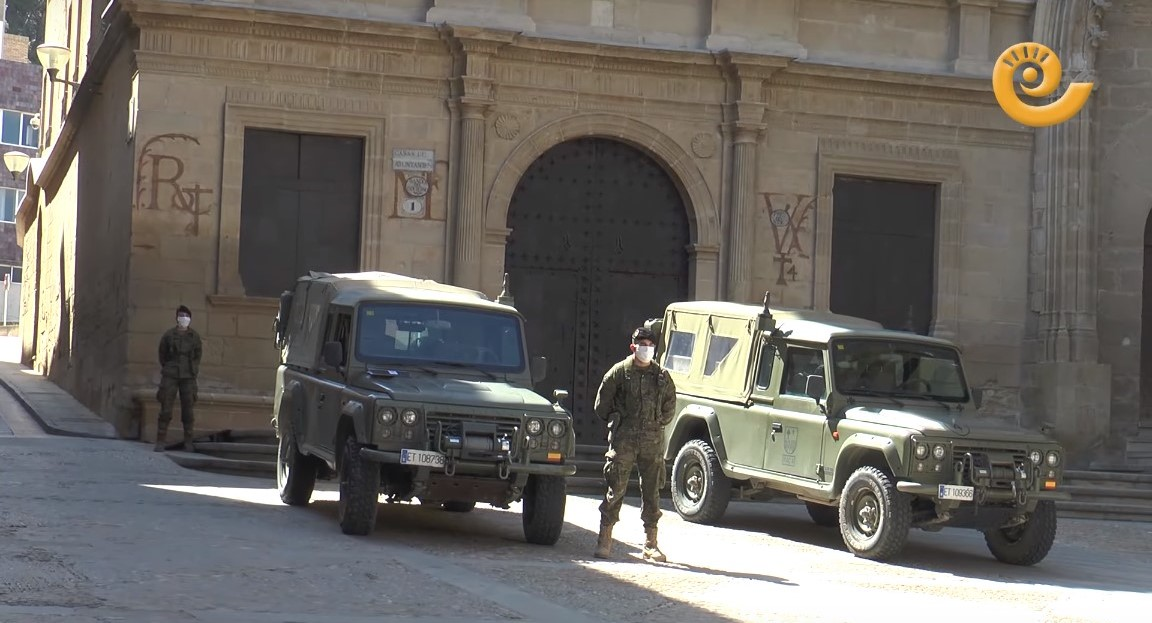
Spanish Army deploys to enforce lockdown in Alcañiz, Aragón, 27 March.

As of 23 March 2020, there were 240,245 police officers and more than 2,500 military deployed across the country. Some police made trips to quarantined populations and played music to lift spirits. On 24 March, the government seized control of private nursing homes nationwide, and announced a judicial inquiry after troops found nursing home patients who had died of COVID-19 left dead in their beds. In Madrid, hospitals refused transfers from nursing homes, and a skating rink was used to store dead bodies as the city morgue overflowed. By 31 March, police had issued 100,000 citations and arrested 1,000 people for violating social distancing regulations. Fines can range from €100 to €30,000 for serious violations or up to four months in prison. Drones are used for enforcement. Police also set up 30,000 roadblocks to stop people from travelling. By 10 April, 3,000 drivers had been sanctioned for violating quarantine while thousands were being stopped each day. Penalties were later increased with fines of €1,000 for a first offence up to €60,000 for a repeat offender.

The ruling by Constitutional Court of Spain in July 2021 rendered void all penalties for violation of citizen mobility restrictions, however it did not oblige the Government to automatically reimburse already collected fines.

=== Criticism ===
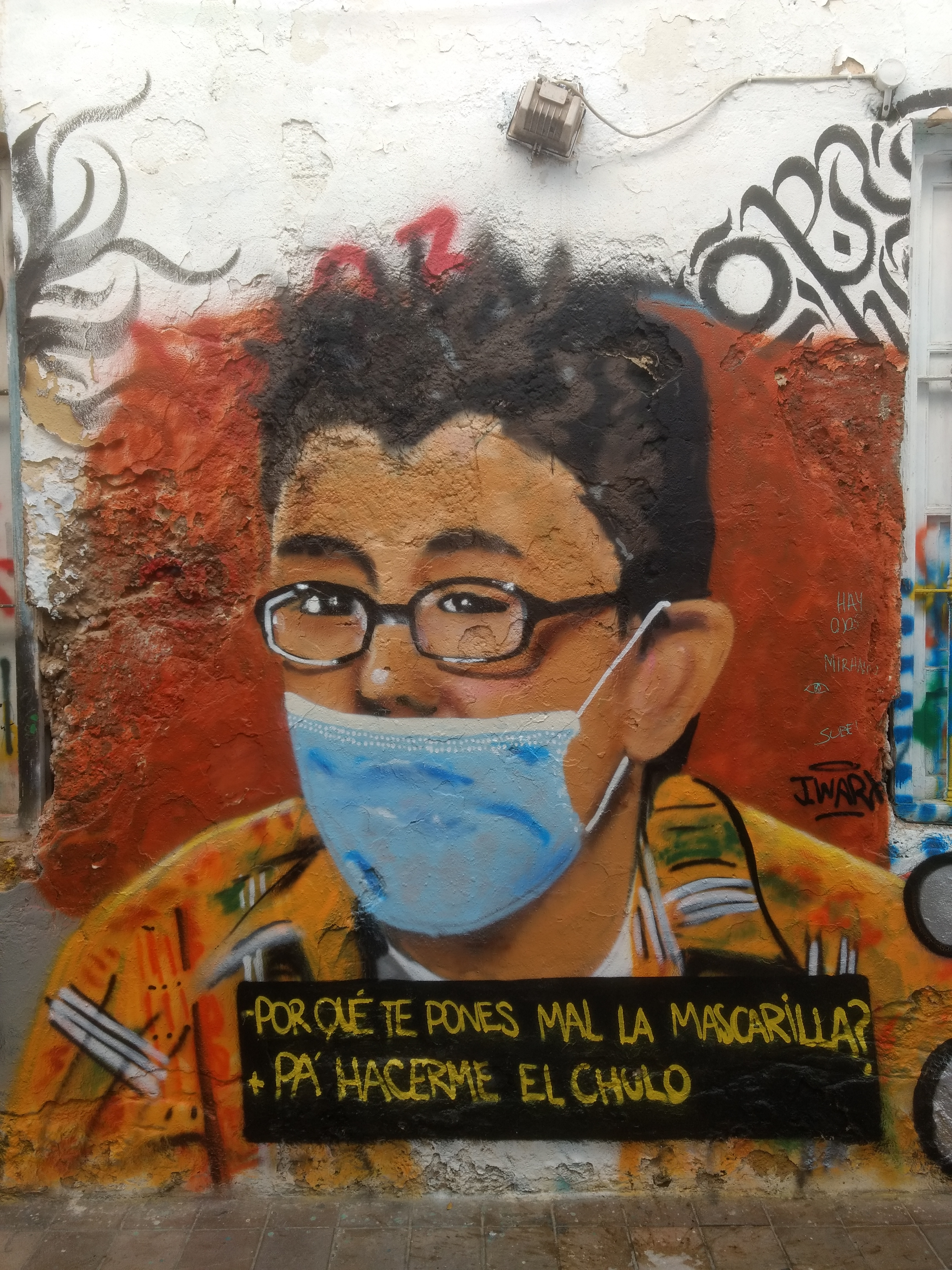
Satirical graffiti in Valencia parodying people wearing face masks in a wrong way.

According to The Guardian, Spain's initially slow response to the coronavirus caused the epidemic to become severe even though it did not share a land border with Italy or other severely affected countries. An analysis in Vox hypothesised that the minority government did not want to risk its hold on power by banning large gatherings early; the prime minister initially defended his decision to allow large gatherings to continue. An opinion piece published by The New York Times blamed the high number of victims on the slow governmental response against the virus, focusing on three causes: a stressed health care system impoverished since the 2008 economic crisis, having to unify the 17 autonomous communities' healthcare systems on a central command, and having an elderly population.

Multiple explanations have been given for the government's slow response to the pandemic, with scholars claiming failure to predict rising global prices of personal protective equipment and testing kits, leading to low supply during the multiple COVID-19 waves that hit the country. The government also failed to isolate the elderly in individual facilities to prevent the spread of the virus amongst the most vulnerable, as well as lacked available information on the evolution of COVID-19 cases in the country, making tracking more difficult. A system of tracing cases and testing availability was eventually made public by the government in the form of an app called "RadarCOVID". However, critics believe such system should have been launched before the final lockdown came to an end. Instead, RadarCOVID was launched on July 20, with additional multiple defects including privacy and transparency issues. The app contributed little to the actual contact tracing.

The Spanish government had ordered 640,000 coronavirus test kits from Shenzhen Bioeasy Biotechnology, which claimed an 80 per cent accuracy rate. However, the Spanish Society of Infectious Diseases and Clinical Microbiology (SEIMC) found that Bioeasy's test kit, which uses nose swabs, had an accuracy rate of less than 30 per cent, and the city of Madrid stopped using them. The Spanish government is trying to get a refund for the defective products. On 29 March, the Czech Republic donated 10,000 protective medical suits and 90 respirators, which were sent in a Czech Air Force plane.

The Spanish Government faced criticism when it started filtering questions of journalists in its virtual press conferences. 400 journalists signed a letter called The Freedom to Ask requesting the filter be removed. On 6 April, the filter was removed and journalists could ask questions directly via webcam.

At a press conference, the Chief of the General Staff of the Civil Guard, General José Manuel Santiago read a statement where that enumerated the actions that the police force was doing at the moment of the crisis. One of the actions was (as read by Santiago) to minimise disaffection to the Spanish Government. Ministry of Internal Affairs excused the general's comments as a lapse. The general explained his comments by clarifying that political criticism is not prosecuted but fake news. An internal email leaked by an unknown source showed that the Civil Guard received orders to report fake news weekly.

=== Vaccination ===
COVID-19 vaccination in Spain is the national vaccination strategy started on 27 December 2020 in order to vaccinate the country's population against COVID-19 within the international effort to fight the COVID-19 pandemic.

As of 23 November 2021, the following doses had been received: 59,296,575 Pfizer–BioNTech COVID-19 vaccine doses, 16,105,300 Moderna vaccine doses, 17,427,500 Oxford–AstraZeneca vaccine doses and 2,659,000 Janssen vaccine doses, totaling to 95,488,375 doses. Out of these doses, 75,173,640 had been administered.

The autonomous communities with the highest fully-vaccinated percentage are Asturias (85.1%) and Galicia (84.9%), while the communities with the lowest percentage are the Canary Islands (75.7%) and the Balearic Islands (72.4%). The Spanish average percentage was 79.1%, amounting to 37,557,243 people.

Out of the total, 3,776,118 have been administered as additional doses, or third doses, of which 3,319,229 are Pfizer–BioNTech COVID-19 vaccine doses and 456,889 are Moderna vaccine doses.

The amount of doses ordered from Q1 to Q4 of 2021 is 141,943,261.

=== Transition to endemic management ===
On 17 January 2022, Pedro Sanchez said the Spanish government was exploring how and when the management of the COVID-19 pandemic would shift to the management of the coronavirus as an endemic illness, saying that "the virus is no longer so deadly". The following day, Tedros Ghebreyesus of the WHO insisted that the pandemic was "nowhere near over", warning that new variants were still "likely to emerge".

== Impact ==
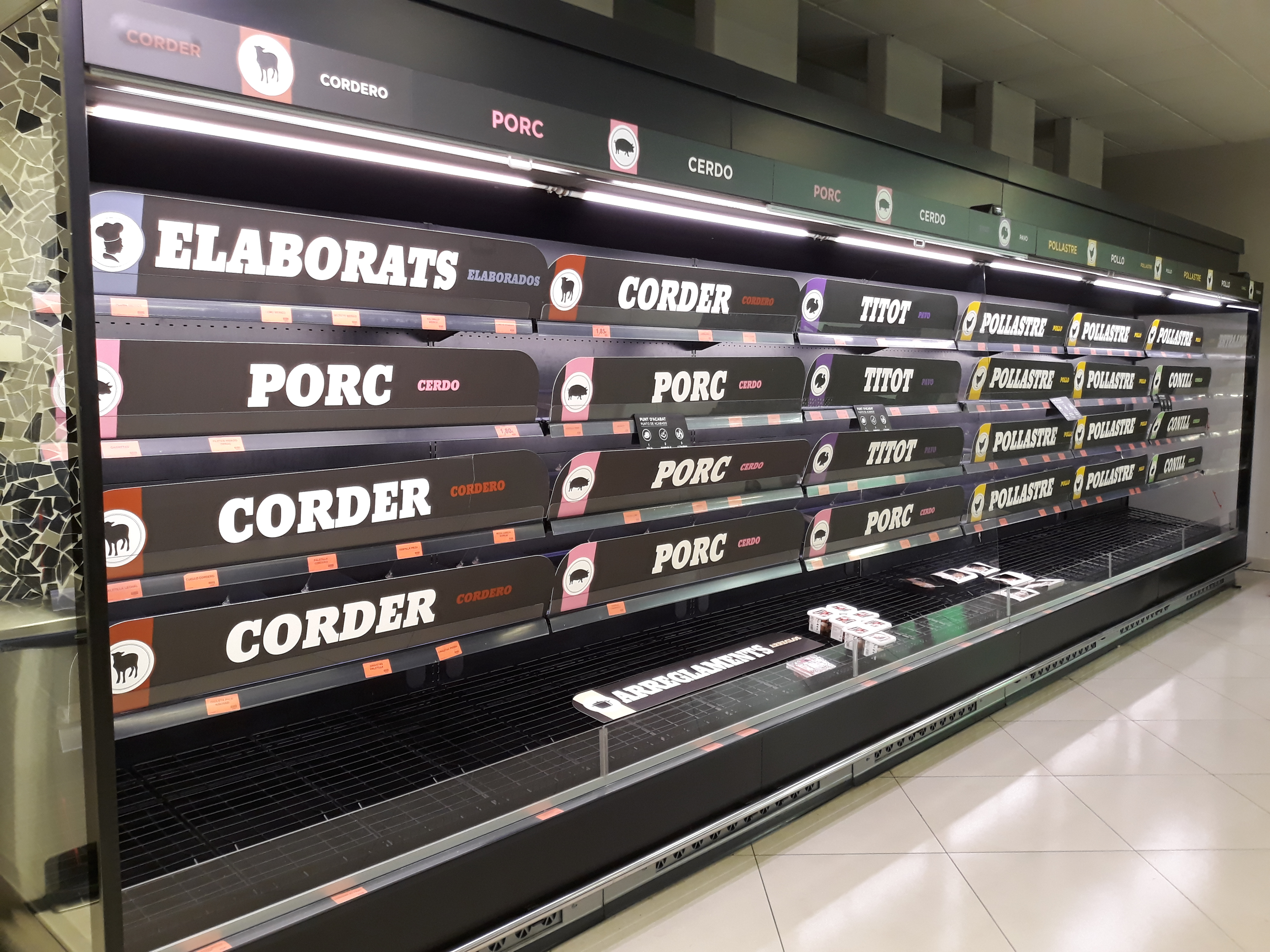
Empty shelves in a Mercadona supermarket in Valencia on 14 March

On 6 March, EFE reported that myths related to the coronavirus were spreading through the country. Panic buying occurred by 10 March. On 28 March, children and young people who obeyed social distancing by staying at home were applauded by Spanish residents for doing their part to combat the epidemic. By 29 March, visits to retail and recreation places, transit stations and parks had fallen by 94%, 88%, and 89% respectively, and visits to workplaces had reduced by 64%, according to a report by Google based on location history data from mobile devices.

The coronavirus has caused a spike in cybercrime; phishing scams imitating the Ministry of Health have targeted WhatsApp users as of 10 April, the National Police Corps has discovered 12,000 fraudulent websites targeting Spaniards. One businessman was arrested for allegedly stealing €5 million in medical equipment. Some companies are selling essential supplies, such as masks or hand sanitiser, at high markup leading to claims of price gouging. Other companies are selling fake miracle cures with aggressive marketing campaigns.

=== Healthcare system ===
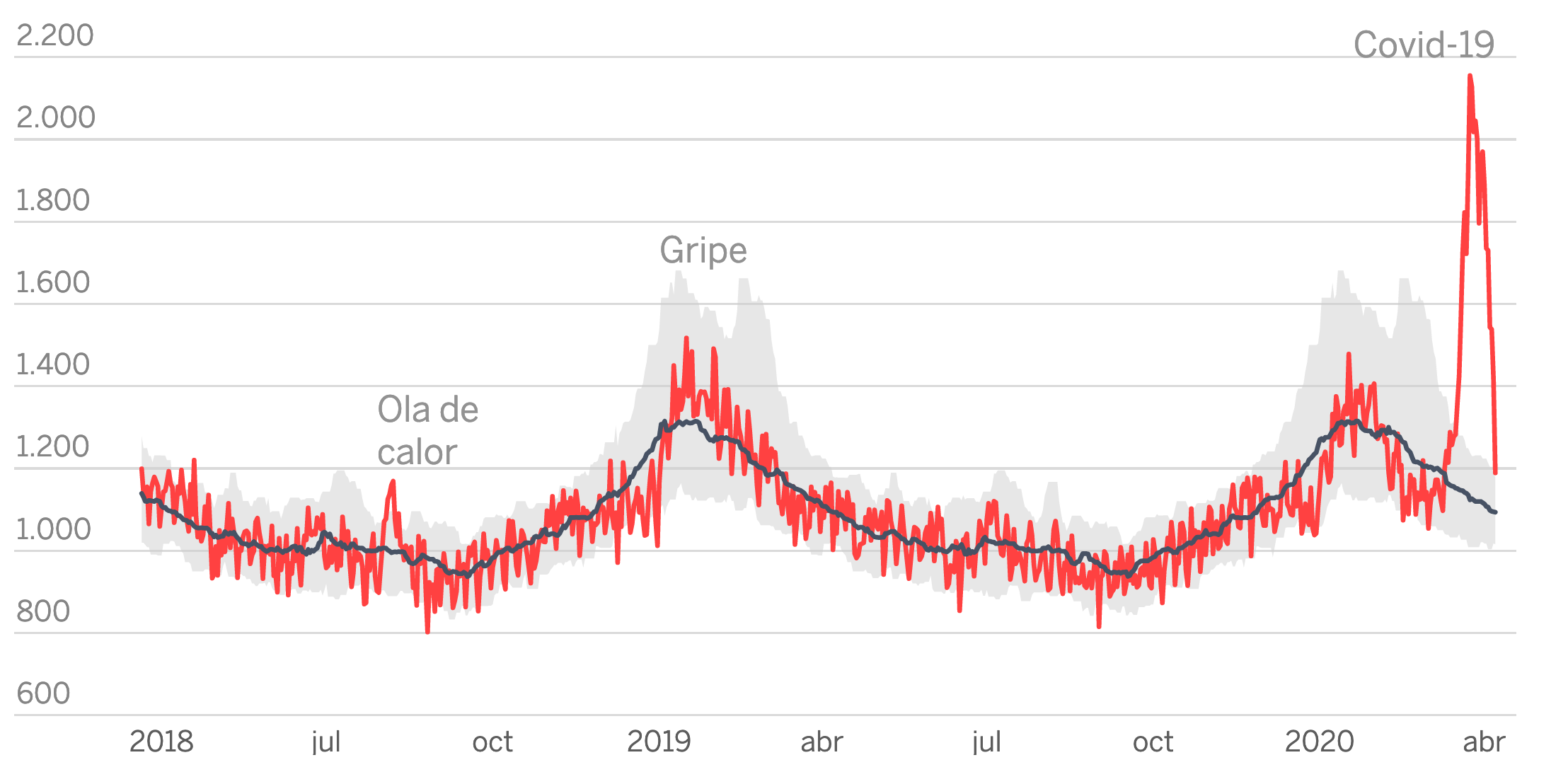
Daily mortality in Spain April 2018 – April 2020. Black indicates expected deaths with confidence interval in grey; red denotes observed deaths.

From 17 March to 14 April, the death rate in Spain was 68% higher than usual and 21,882 excess deaths occurred, with the vast majority of excess mortality observed among those older than 74 years. The peak of excess deaths occurred during the week of 27 March to 3 April and was five times larger than the flu season of 2019. On 23 March, The Guardian reported that hospitals in the Madrid area were being overwhelmed by coronavirus patients. Per capita, Spain has only a third as many hospital beds as Germany and Austria. As of 28 March, the burden on Intensive care units per confirmed case was 7.8, almost as high as Italy and far above any other European country. As of 31 March, Intensive care units in Catalonia, Madrid, Castilla–La Mancha, and Castile and León were at or over 80% capacity, despite efforts to triple the number of beds available; most of the patients had coronavirus. After 1 April, some hospitals in Madrid saw a small decline in the number of patients in intensive care while others were stable or still rising. The number of patients in intensive care in Galicia, Asturias, and Castilla–La Mancha also dropped. In Castilla y León, Catalonia, and Valencia it was stable, while in Aragón and Andalucía it peaked later. The number of patients in intensive care in the autonomous communities with most cases reached its peak on the first days of April.

Austerity measures, enacted by the previous government of Mariano Rajoy which cut billions of euros from health budgets, were blamed by some experts for reducing the capacity of the healthcare system. Healthcare spending in Spain is 5.9 per cent, below the EU average of 7.5 per cent. Before the coronavirus epidemic, some doctors were unemployed or had emigrated to look for work. Now, retired healthcare workers are being called back to the job and medical students are being recruited to perform some tasks. The privatisation of hospitals undergone during Rajoy's tenure has undermined efforts to coordinate the response to the crisis.

=== Age and economic impact ===
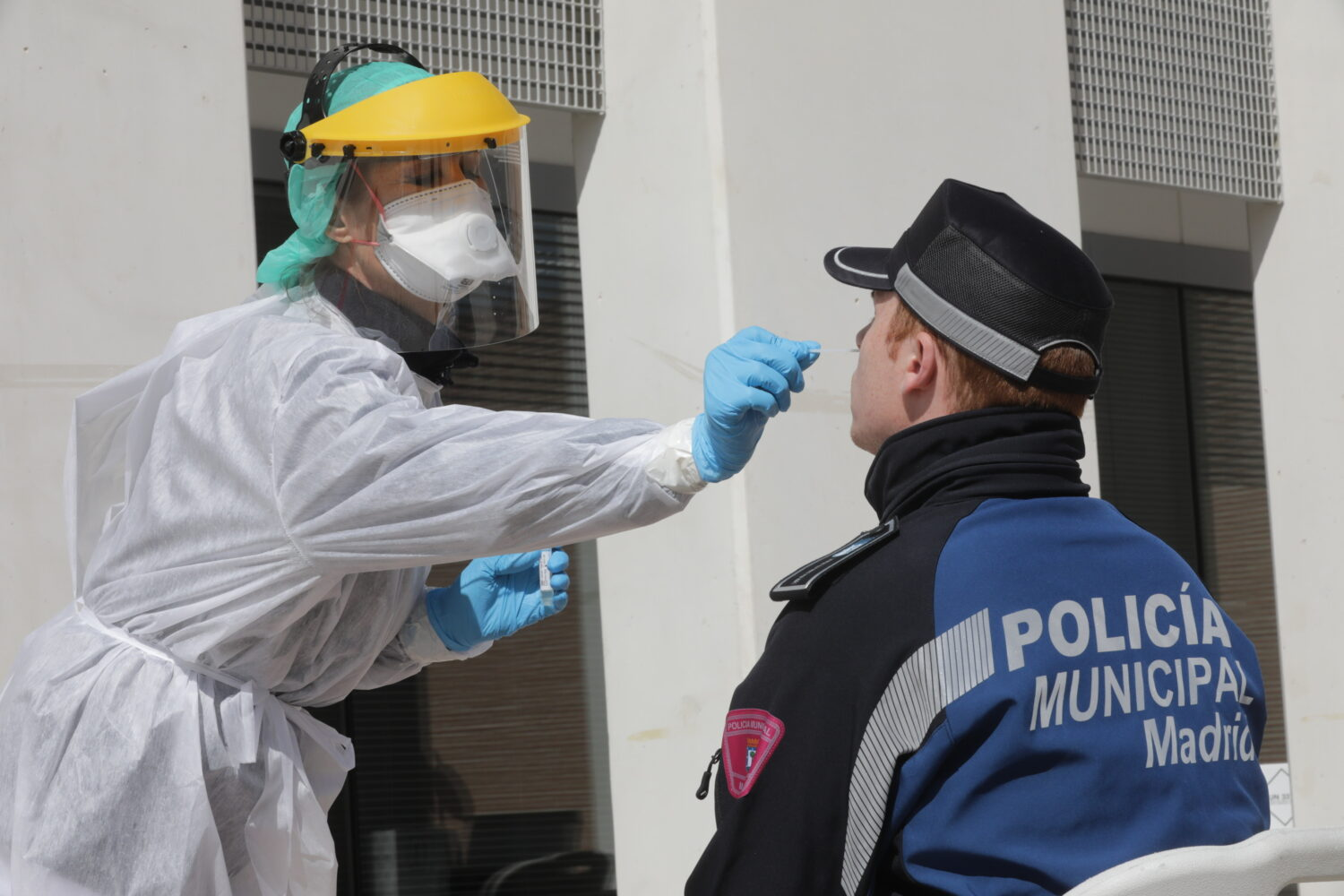
Local police officer in Madrid is tested for coronavirus, 25 March.

Low income neighbourhoods in Barcelona have seven times the rate of infection of more affluent neighbourhoods. Part of the reason is that essential workers, who have kept going to work despite the epidemic, are likely to work in low-skill jobs such as supermarkets or elder care. Also, many care workers are immigrants, who lack access to unemployment benefits and live in some of the lowest category housing. Homeless people are also at risk and the charities that help them were forced to cease operations because of the disease. The Community of Madrid has asked the Military Emergencies Unit to enter the Cañada Real, the largest illegal slum in a European city, and provide assistance, because the poor living conditions there make self-isolation difficult. The Spanish Red Cross has been providing aid and delivering meals.

Many nursing homes in Spain are understaffed because they are for-profit businesses and elderly Spaniards cannot necessarily afford sufficient care; the salary for most workers is less than €1,000 per month. Even before the crisis, safety violations occurred frequently. The lack of PPE and inability to quarantine infected individuals exacerbated the spread of the disease. In some nursing homes, elderly victims were found abandoned in their beds by Spanish soldiers mounting emergency response. Defense minister Margarita Robles said anyone guilty of neglect will be prosecuted. By 18 April 38 residences were under investigation. Some hospitals refused to admit sick people from nursing homes. Thousands of elder care workers have been infected. By 18 April, more than 13,600 Spaniards in nursing homes who were probable or confirmed coronavirus cases had died, including ten per cent of nursing home residents in the Community of Madrid, while at least 39,000 were infected according to incomplete figures as some communities were not deaggregating their figures.

Sick leave benefits for employees were cut as one of the governments imposed measures to control the virus spread, resulting in increasing absence at the workplace of up to 20% more than average. Usually, under Spain's labor laws, workers are entitled to at least 60% of their wage by their employee under temporary sick leave. However, the government decided to change their sick leave policies towards recognizing the COVID-19 illness as an occupational disease, benefitting the worker by qualifying for higher benefits under this distinction. The time limit for the application for unemployment benefits was increased, and benefits were recognized for workers who had not met the standard minimum contribution period.

During the pandemic, the healthcare system is using triage, reserving ventilators for younger and healthier individuals because of the poor prognosis for survival. A critical care medical association released triage criteria that included the "life expectancy" and "social value" of the patient. More than 65% of fatalities have occurred in those 80 or older, compared to 50% in Italy and only 15% in China.

=== Finance ===
On 9 March, the Spanish stock index IBEX 35 dropped 7.96%, the fourth-largest single-day loss in its history. On 12 March, the stock index dropped another 14.06%, the largest in history, as part of the 2020 stock market crash. The pandemic has also influenced Spain's fragile economy and finances, with economist Toni Roldán saying the country will need €200bn in loans from the European Stability Mechanism. Spanish leaders have called for "corona bonds", similar to the proposed but never implemented eurobonds, to help the country recover from the epidemic. Real estate transactions have nearly been frozen by the crisis, and future impact remains uncertain. Employment in Spain saw its largest historical drop in a month in March, with close to 900,000 people losing their jobs between 12 and 31 March.

Economists estimate that the government deficit will increase from 2.6% in 2019 to 15% in 2020. These estimates are based on a projection that the tax revenue will fall by €40 billion and GDP will drop 5%. As of 28 March, Goldman Sachs was predicting a double-digit GDP decline for Spain. The country's financial institutions are in better shape than they were before the 2008–2014 Spanish financial crisis, and exports and trade balance have improved. However, the debt-to-GDP ratio, government deficit, and unemployment are all higher than they were in 2008, leaving the government less room to manoeuver in its response to the crisis. According to an article in El País, house prices in some parts of Spain have seen significant declines, although few sales are occurring due to the lockdown.

The Spanish cabinet is supposed to approve 3 to 3.5 billion dollars grants to help the poorest during the pandemic so that they can weather the economic fallout. More than 1 million families will benefit from the scheme.

By 30 September, the deadline for claiming the first wave of support, €98.8 billion had been granted in investment guarantees to self employed, small, medium and large corporations.

=== Politics ===
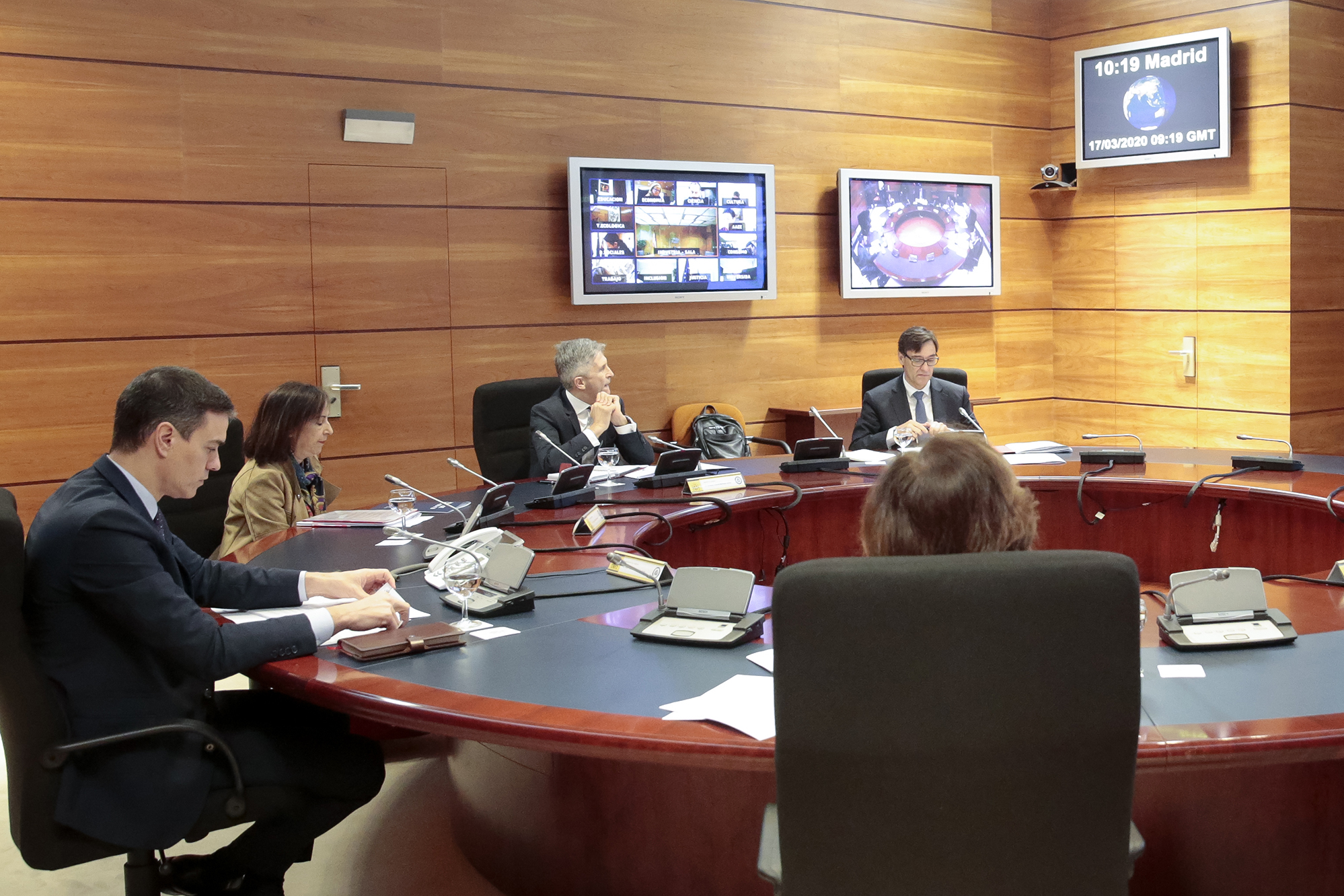
Due to the pandemic, the Cabinet had to meet virtually for the first time, with the majority of ministers attending via videoconference.

Javier Ortega Smith, member of Vox, tested positive after his party hosted a large meeting with sympathizers on 8 March, leading the Congress of Deputies and the Senate to suspend their parliamentary activity for a period of a week with 52 Vox's lawmakers asked to stay at home. On 11 March, the Assembly of Madrid, regional parliament of Madrid, suspended its activities for a period of 15 days, following Ortega Smith's positive test. The Parliament of Andalusia, regional parliament of Andalusia, suspended its activities for a week after a deputy in the regional chamber from Vox was confirmed positive. The 2020 Basque regional election, scheduled for 5 April, was delayed, after an agreement between all the political parties represented in the Basque parliament; the Galician election was also suspended.

On 18 March, The Congress of Deputies met and the Prime Minister reported on the management of the state of Alarm with only 5% of lawmakers present. When the Congress of Deputies approved the extension of the State of Alarm on 18 March, it was the first time opposition parties The People's Party and Vox had supported the government in a vote while separatist parties, such as Republican Left of Catalonia, abstained. The King Felipe VI addressed a message to the nation in a special speech for the second time in his reign and the sixth by a monarch in 40 years of democracy. A donation from the Chinese government of more than 500,000 facemasks arrived in Spain. The Regional Government of Andalusia has paid for sponsored content praising its handling of the coronavirus outbreak, some of which attribute federal initiatives to the Andalusian government. The ads have been published in El Mundo, ABC, El Confidencial, and other media.

Spain's government response to the coronavirus has been criticised as insufficient or late by several international organisations and newspapers. PM Pedro Sánchez is leading the Spanish Socialist Workers' Party (in coalition with Unidas Podemos) minority government, which is counting on support from opposition parties to enact coronavirus measures, especially with regards to economic stimulus. The cabinet discussed proposals to offer zero-interest loans to tenants to pay rent so smaller landlords who depend on rent income can stay afloat. PP leader Pablo Casado complained that the government was not keeping him informed of developments on the coronavirus. Citizens leader Inés Arrimadas said she supports the government's actions. Vox has called for the prime minister's resignation.

Opposition parties have alleged that Sánchez' government is deliberately understating the death toll. In parliament, Casado said "Spaniards deserve a government that doesn't lie to them," and suggested the actual death toll could be twice the confirmed figure. Vox posted a digitally altered image on social media of Gran Vía, Madrid filled with coffins. The government denies the allegations and the justice ministry asked autonomous communities to examine death records for suspected coronavirus deaths.

On 23 May 2020, Vox held large rallies in Madrid and other cities protesting the government's response to the pandemic. By mid June 2020 the (once daily) protests in Madrid had largely dissipated in their core, the well-off (and staunchly conservative) street of Núñez de Balboa. One of the three last protesters still standing blamed the lack of appeal on people becoming tired, "the pubs have opened and football has returned".

=== Education ===
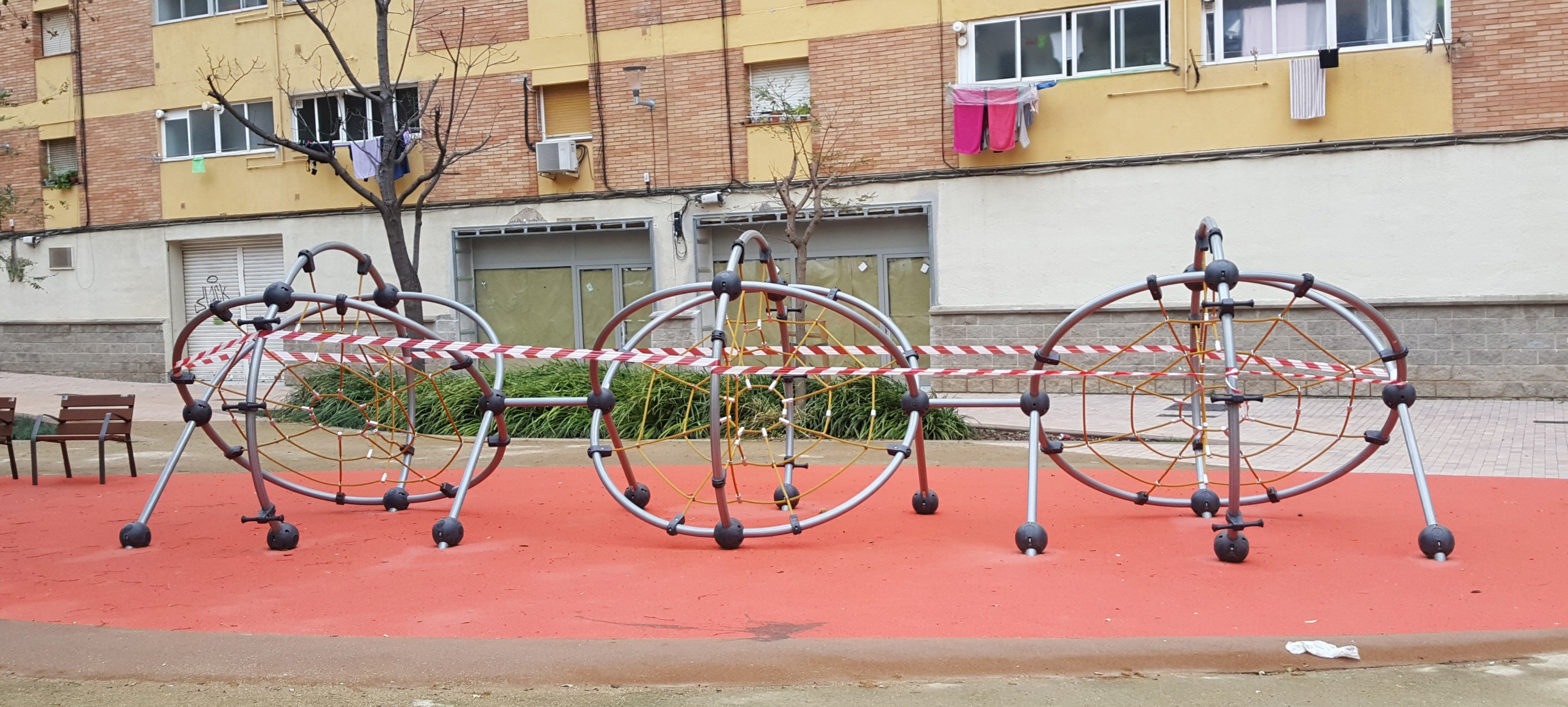
Playground in Sant Martí, Barcelona, is shut down.

On 9 March, Isabel Díaz Ayuso announced the cancellation of classes in the Autonomous community of Madrid at all educational levels due to the strong increase in cases in the region, which affected 1.5 million students. The Basque Government closed all schools in the municipalities of Vitoria and Labastida. A Barcelona kindergarten was closed after a worker tested positive, On 10 March, the Conference of Rectors of Madrid public universities (CRUMA) delayed the academic calendar, including classes, exams and enrolments, by two weeks. and the regional government of La Rioja suspended classes for two weeks.

On 11 March, the Minister of Health of the Basque government, Nekane Murga, announced the closure of all schools in Álava, after 12 pupils were diagnosed with coronavirus; the measure affected more than 60,000 students. On 12 March, the regional governments of Murcia, Galicia, Catalonia, the Basque Country, Asturias, Aragon, Canary Islands, Castile-La Mancha, Navarre, Extremadura, Balearic Islands, Cantabria and the city of Melilla suspend classes at all educational levels in their respective regions, making a total of 14 out of 17 autonomous communities and one of the autonomous cities with school closures. More than ten million students (a million university and nine million in secondary and primary education) were ordered to stay home, initially for two weeks. On 17 March, the Selectividad (Spanish University Admission Tests), scheduled in June for more than 300,000 students, was delayed until further notice. On 18 March, the Basque Minister of Education extended the closure of schools indefinitely.

School reopened fully in September 2020, but new rules were introduced as the country was experiencing a resurgence of cases, for example, all students over the age of six must wear masks, class sizes were reduced, students were separated in assigned 'bubbles' to prevent mixing, and desks kept 1.5m apart.

=== Religion ===
On 6 March, the Spanish Episcopal Conference indicated that churches should remove the holy water from the pillars, avoid the gesture of shaking hands as a way of giving peace, and not kiss religious images, a typical gesture in Lent. Religious processions of Holy Week were suspended. The Royal Decree for the State of Alarm decreed the attendance to religious places was made conditional on the adoption of contention measures in accordance to the features and size of the places. Many masses were suspended. National Police agents evicted twenty churchgoers from the Granada Cathedral on Good Friday (10 April).

=== Tourism ===
Spain's tourism sector was heavily impacted, with a 98% decline in international tourist arrivals, in comparison to 2019 when it was registered as the second country with the most tourist arrivals in the world. In terms of hotel occupancy rates, only a 27% occupancy was recorded. Spain's tourism sector accounts for 12% of GDP, making this sanitary crisis seriously impactful towards the country's economy.

== Spread to other countries and territories ==
On 29 February 2020, a woman who had arrived in Ecuador on 14 February from Spain tested positive for SARS-CoV-2 and became the first case of coronavirus in the country. On 13 March 2020, the first death (the first Ecuadorian infection case) was reported by the Minister of Public Health of Ecuador, Catalina Andramuño, during a press conference in Guayaquil. Many of the earlier cases in Ecuador were imported by wealthy Ecuadorian students who were studying abroad and returned home.

On 6 March, Peruvian Ministry of Health and President confirmed the first case in the country from a 25-year-old man who visited Spain, France and Czech Republic.

On 8 March, Portugal confirmed a case originating from Spain. On 10 March, a further case was detected and the following day (11 March) another three cases.

On 10 March, a 40-year-old woman returning from Madrid, Spain was confirmed as the first case in Panama.

On 10, March, Honduras confirmed two cases of Coronavirus. The first patient, or patient zero, was a pregnant woman who came from Spain on 4 March but was confirmed in the early morning of 10 March.

On 13 March, Venezuelan Vice-president Delcy Rodríguez confirmed two cases of the virus in the state of Miranda.

On 14 March, it was reported that a woman coming from the Spanish city of Móstoles became the first case in Equatorial Guinea.

On 17 March, a 47-year-old male Spanish national doing business in Macau tested positive; he took Flight SU2501 from Madrid to Moscow on 15 March, and then the Flight SU204 from Moscow to Beijing. On 16 March, he took Flight NX001 from Beijing to Macau, arriving at Macau Airport at 8:00 pm the same day.

On 20 March, Prime Minister of Papua New Guinea James Marape confirmed the first case in the country, from a mine worker who had travelled from Spain.

== Statistics ==
=== Charts based on daily reports ===
Charts based on daily reports from the Spanish Ministry of Health on confirmed cases of COVID-19. Dates correspond to report dates; reports starting from 2020 to 2003-17 refer to numbers consolidated the night before at 9:00 pm; reports starting from 2020 to 2005-18 refer to numbers consolidated the night before at midnight, and no longer include the number of recoveries. From 2020 to 2005-31 deaths only include people whose death was registered within 24 hours of the death taking place. From 2020 to 2006-15 numbers of deaths were revised upwards.

Cumulative number of cases, active cases, recoveries and deaths

View source data.

Confirmed new cases per day

View source data.

Confirmed deaths per day

View source data.

Confirmed COVID-19 cases per region

Cases confirmed by PCR per region, for the 10 regions with most cases (logarithmic scale) in 2020

View source data.

=== Underreporting ===
Cases

Ministry of Health statistics are underestimates as they are based on incomplete data. Confirmed cases are those that test positive, but only those with severe symptoms are offered tests and testing may lag symptom onset by as much as a week. On 7 March, the Ministry of Health estimated that the actual number of cases is at least 15 times higher than the number of confirmed cases. On 17 April, when the number of confirmed cases stood at 190,000, the ten autonomous communities that were tracking suspected cases had reported an additional 419,000 suspected cases. Three-quarters of probable cases were in Madrid or Catalonia, with Madrid reporting 248,760 suspected cases and 51,993 confirmed. Probable cases are those who have mild acute respiratory infection and have not received any test, either PCR or the less reliable rapid test. People diagnosed as possible cases have to self-isolate at home for two weeks.

A country-wide study of seroprevalence (conducted by the Ministry of Health, along the ISCIII and the INE, in partnership with the autonomous communities) on a representative sample of more than 63,000 people, determined that roughly 5.2% of the population had developed IgG antibodies for the SARS-CoV-2 virus. This represents approximately 2 million people, a figure 10 times higher than the confirmed cases, and is in line with estimates from the CoronaSurveys project. The Community of Madrid and several provinces of Castilla–La Mancha and Castile and León were found to be the most affected areas with a percentage of infection greater than 10%.

Deaths

The number of deaths by COVID is also an underestimate because only confirmed cases are considered, and because many people die at home or in nursing homes without being tested. In March, the Community of Madrid estimated 4,260 people have died in nursing homes with coronavirus symptoms (out of 4,750 total deaths in the homes), but only 781 were diagnosed and counted as COVID fatalities. The Catalan government initially reported exclusively deaths of confirmed COVID patients that occurred in medical facilities; it included those happening at homes and in nursing homes on 15 April, nearly doubling its deaths from 3,855 to 7,097. On 17 April, the Ministry of Health announced they would retrospectively revise their data to use a single criterion across autonomous communities.

Mortality reports by Carlos III Health Institute have found significant excess mortality in the first four months of 2020, with about 44,000 more people deceased than in the same period of 2019. The Spanish Ministry of Health and the BBC estimate that the number of deaths due to COVID are probably about 15,000 more than in official COVID death statistics.

At the end of July, the Spanish newspaper El País reported 44,868 deaths caused by COVID-19, whereas the Government's death toll figure at that moment was 28,000. In December 2020 the Spanish National Statistics Institute published a revised death count from March through May, which exceeded the official count at that time by about 70% (27,127 against 49,912 deaths).

== See also ==
- COVID-19 pandemic death rates by country
- COVID-19 pandemic in Europe
- COVID-19 pandemic by country and territory
- COVID-19 pandemic in the Community of Madrid
- COVID-19 pandemic in Asturias
- COVID-19 pandemic in Ceuta
- COVID-19 pandemic in Melilla
- COVID-19 pandemic in the Canary Islands
