= COVID-19 pandemic in Ceuta and Melilla =

COVID-19 pandemic in Ceuta and Melilla refers to cases in the two Spanish autonomous cities in on the northern coast of Africa.

It is covered by:

- COVID-19 pandemic in Ceuta
- COVID-19 pandemic in Melilla
