= COVID-19 pandemic in the Canary Islands =

Ongoing COVID-19 viral pandemic in the Canary Islands

- Disease: COVID-19
- Pathogen: SARS-CoV-2
- Location: Canary Islands, Spain
- First outbreak: Germany
- Index case: La Gomera
- Arrival date: 31 January 2020 (6 years, 3 months, 2 weeks and 4 days)
- Confirmed cases: 38,170 (as of 15 February 2021)
- Recovered: 1,537 (as of 23 January 2021)
- Deaths: 558 (as of 15 February 2021)

The COVID-19 pandemic was confirmed to have spread to the Canary Islands, Spain, on 31 January 2020, when a German tourist was tested positive in La Gomera. The second confirmed case of the disease in the islands was found on 24 February, following the outbreak in Italy, when a medical doctor from Lombardy, Italy who was vacationing in Tenerife was tested positive for the disease. Afterwards, multiple cases were detected in Tenerife involving people who had come into contact with the same doctor.
