= COVID-19 pandemic in Melilla =

Ongoing COVID-19 viral pandemic in Melilla, Spain

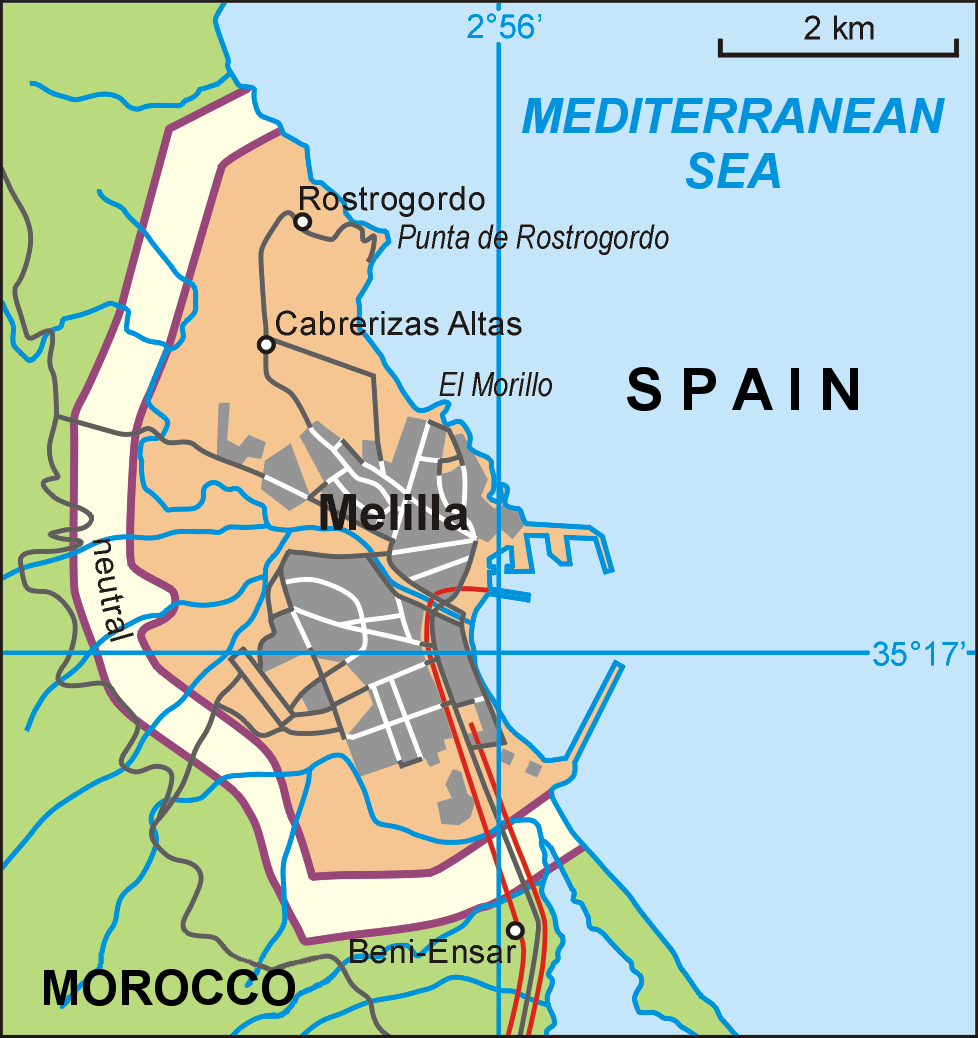
- Disease: COVID-19
- Pathogen: SARS-CoV-2
- Location: Melilla
- First outbreak: Wuhan, Hubei, China
- Arrival date: 10 March 2020 (6 years, 2 months, 1 week and 4 days)
- Confirmed cases: 107
- Recovered: 27
- Deaths: 2

The COVID-19 pandemic was confirmed to have reached the Spanish city of Melilla in March 2020.

== Timeline ==
=== March 2020 ===
A man who arrived from the Iberian Peninsula carried the virus into the autonomous city of Melilla.

=== April 2020 ===
By April 16, the city had confirmed a total of 103 cases. 27 had recovered, and two had died.
