= COVID-19 pandemic in Ceuta =

Ongoing COVID-19 viral pandemic in Ceuta, Spain

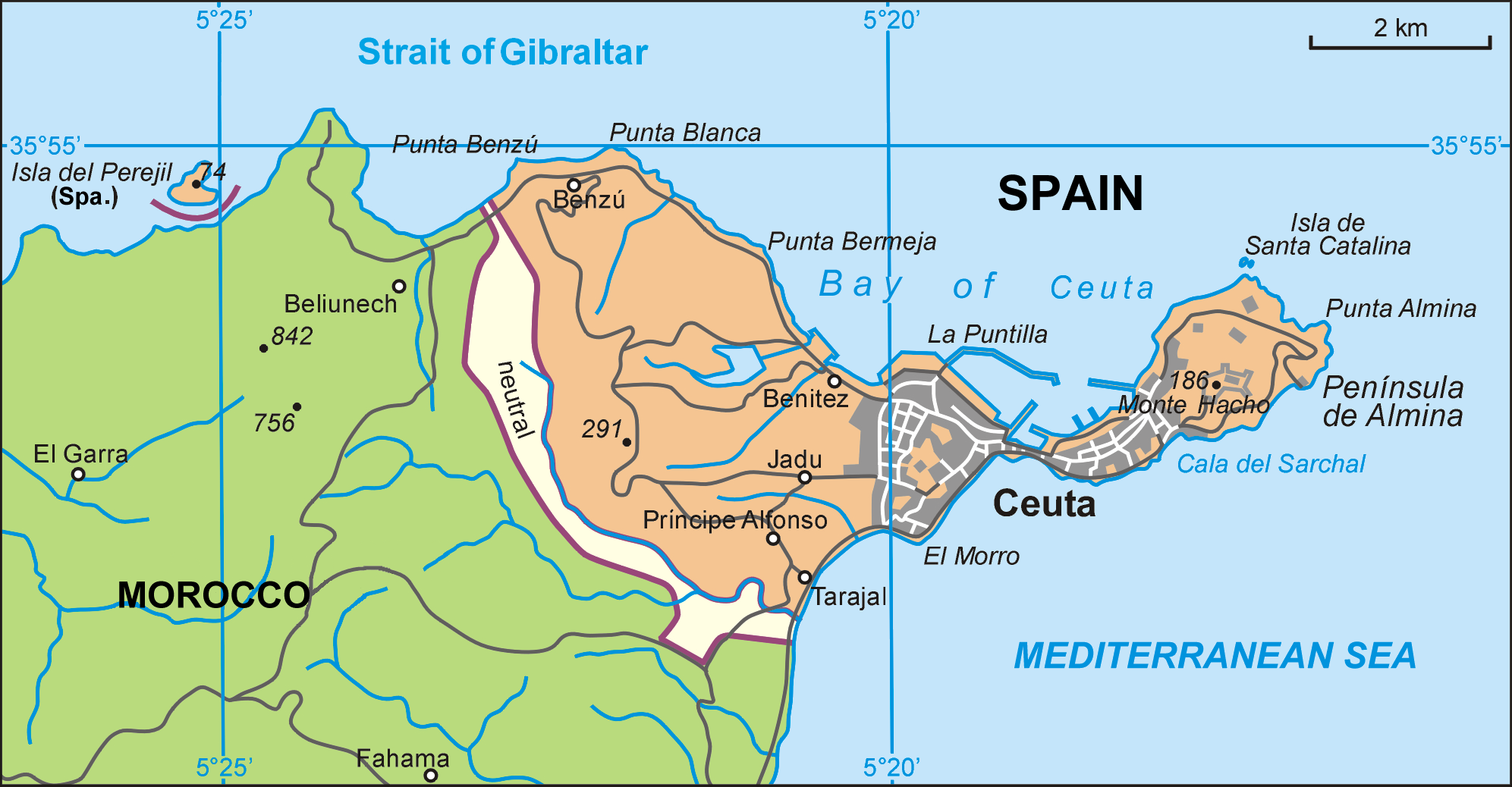
- Disease: COVID-19
- Pathogen: SARS-CoV-2
- Location: Ceuta
- First outbreak: Wuhan, Hubei, China
- Arrival date: 13 March 2020 (6 years, 2 months, 1 week and 4 days)
- Confirmed cases: 222
- Recovered: 218
- Deaths: 4

The COVID-19 pandemic was confirmed to have reached the Spanish city of Ceuta in March 2020.

== Timeline ==
=== April 2020 ===
By April 4, the autonomous city had confirmed 83 cases of COVID-19, with 74 staying at home (two of which had thus far recovered), seven cases hospitalized, and two deaths.

As of April 16, the city confirmed 100 cases of COVID-19 total. 42 people had overcome the virus, and four had died.
