= Edificio Bel Air =

Skyscraper in the Canary Islands

Coordinates: 28.4148°N 16.5479°W

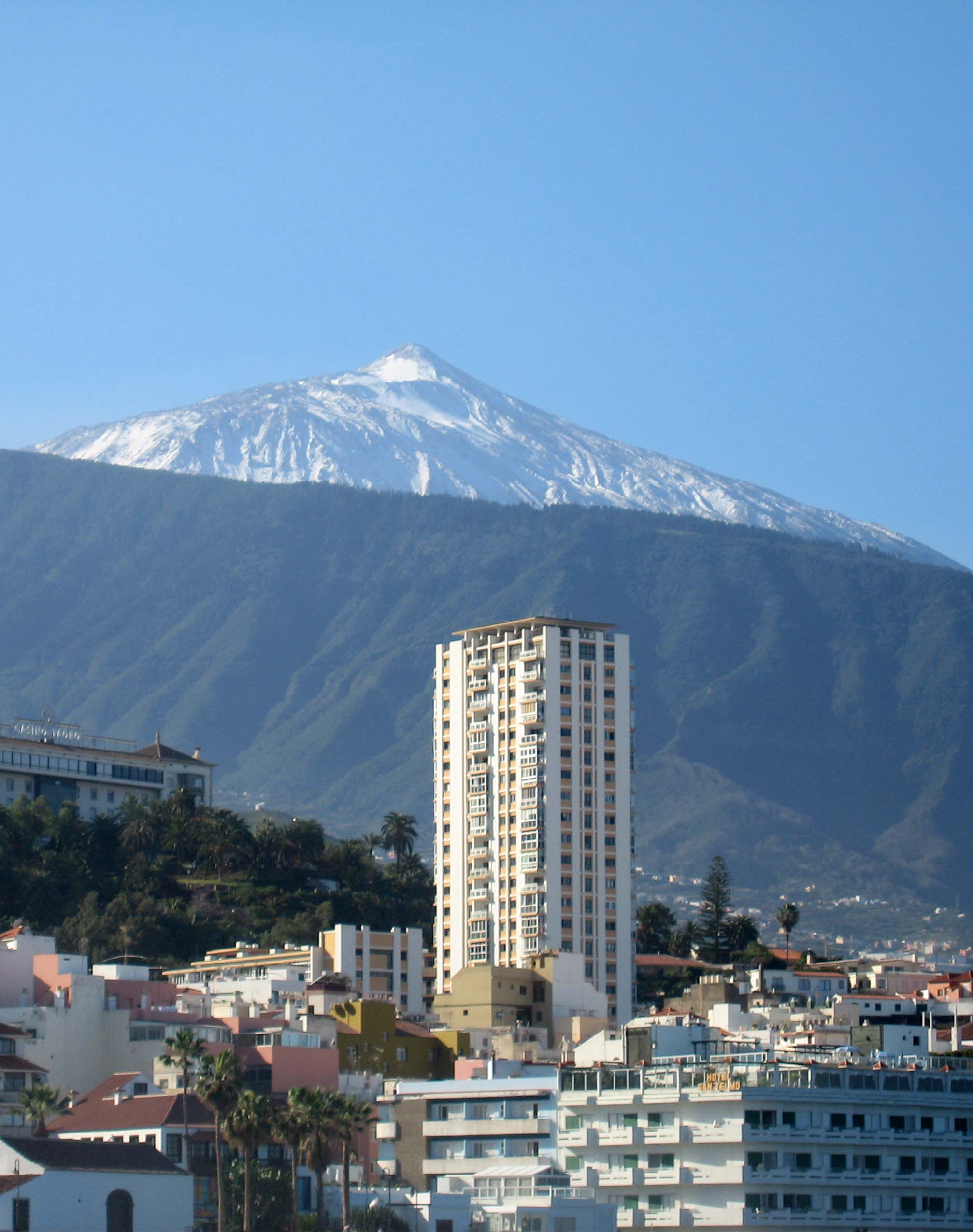
- Interactive map of the Edificio Bel Air area

General information
- Type: Residential
- Location: Puerto de la Cruz, Spain
- Completed: 1960

Height
- Height: 75 metres (246 ft)

The Bel Air Building is a skyscraper in the town of Puerto de la Cruz, Tenerife, Canary Islands, Spain. Completed in 1960, it has 26 floors and rises up to 75 metres (246 ft). It is the fourth tallest building on the island of Tenerife, after the twin Santa Cruz Towers and Tres de Mayo Avenue Skyscraper, both in Santa Cruz, the island's capital.

Built in 1960, it began as a hotel of American innovation. Twenty years later it became private residential apartments.

== See also ==
- List of tallest buildings in Canary Islands
