= Edificio Olympo =

Skyscraper in the Canary Islands

Coordinates: 28.4665°N 16.2482°W

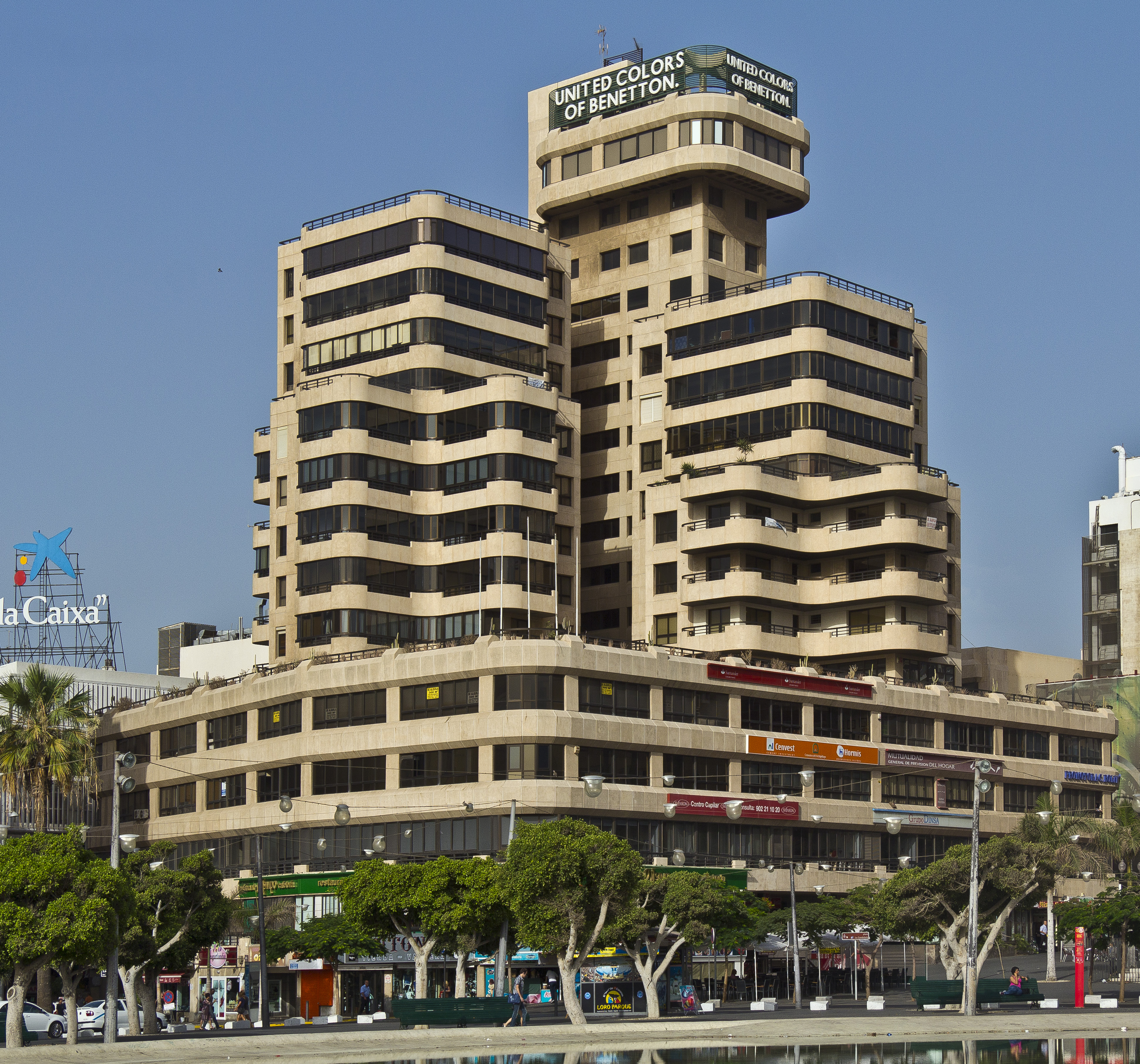
- Edificio Olympo
- Interactive map of the Edificio Olympo area

General information
- Status: Completed
- Type: mixed
- Location: Santa Cruz, Spain
- Completed: 1975

Height
- Height: 57 m (187 ft)

Technical details
- Floor count: 19

Design and construction
- Architect: José Miguel Molowny Barreto

Edificio Olympo is a skyscraper in the city of Santa Cruz on the island of Tenerife, Canary Islands, Spain. Completed in 1975, has 19 floors and rises 57 meters. Lies on the Plaza de la Candelaria 1, near some other skyscrapers, including Torres de Santa Cruz and Rascacielos de la avenida Tres de Mayo. It has an innovative and distinctive look. Main usage: offices, residential and shopping center.

== See also ==
- List of tallest buildings in Canary Islands
