= Iñaki Ábalos =

Spanish architect and writer

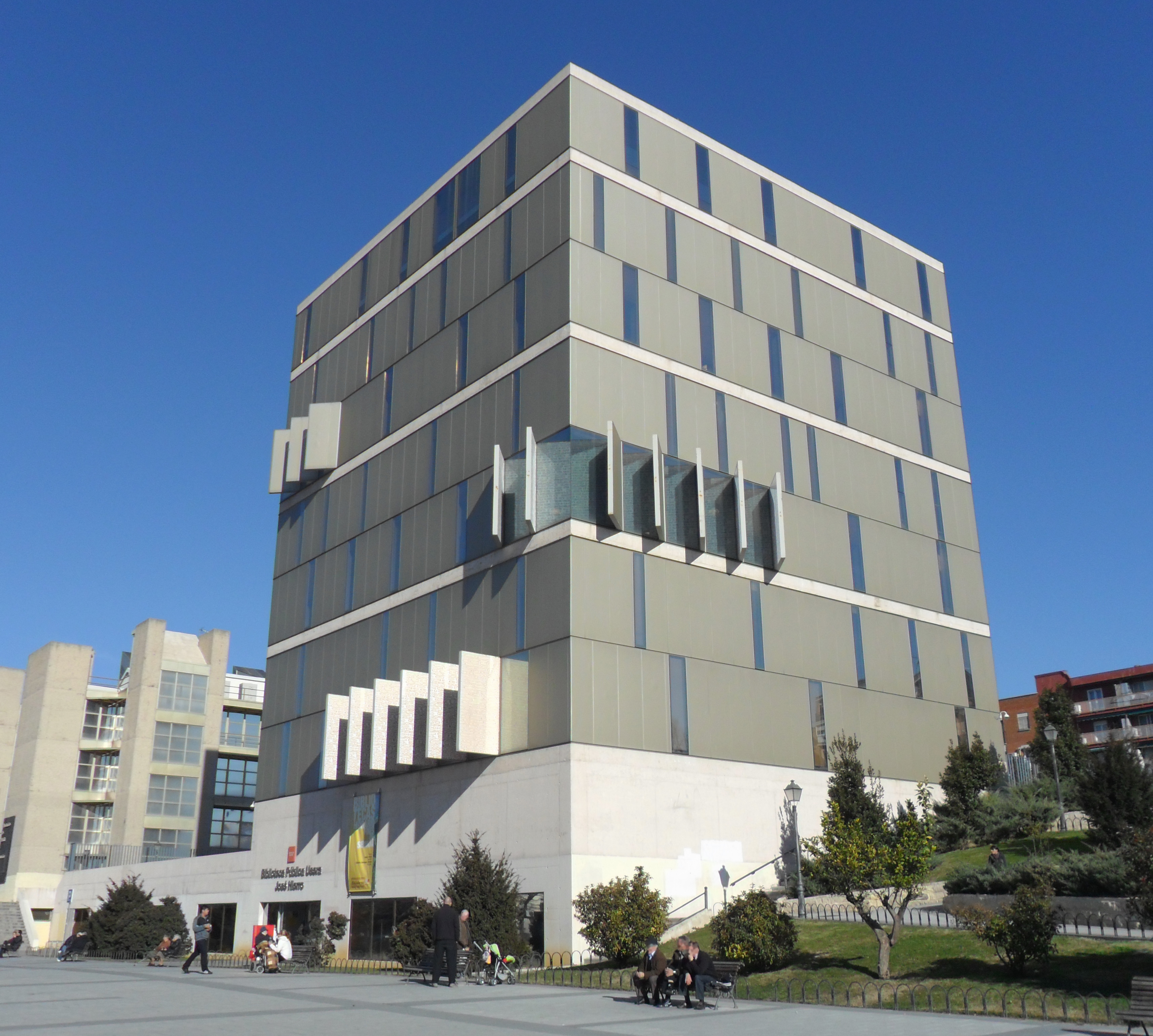
José Hierro Public Library in the Usera district of Madrid

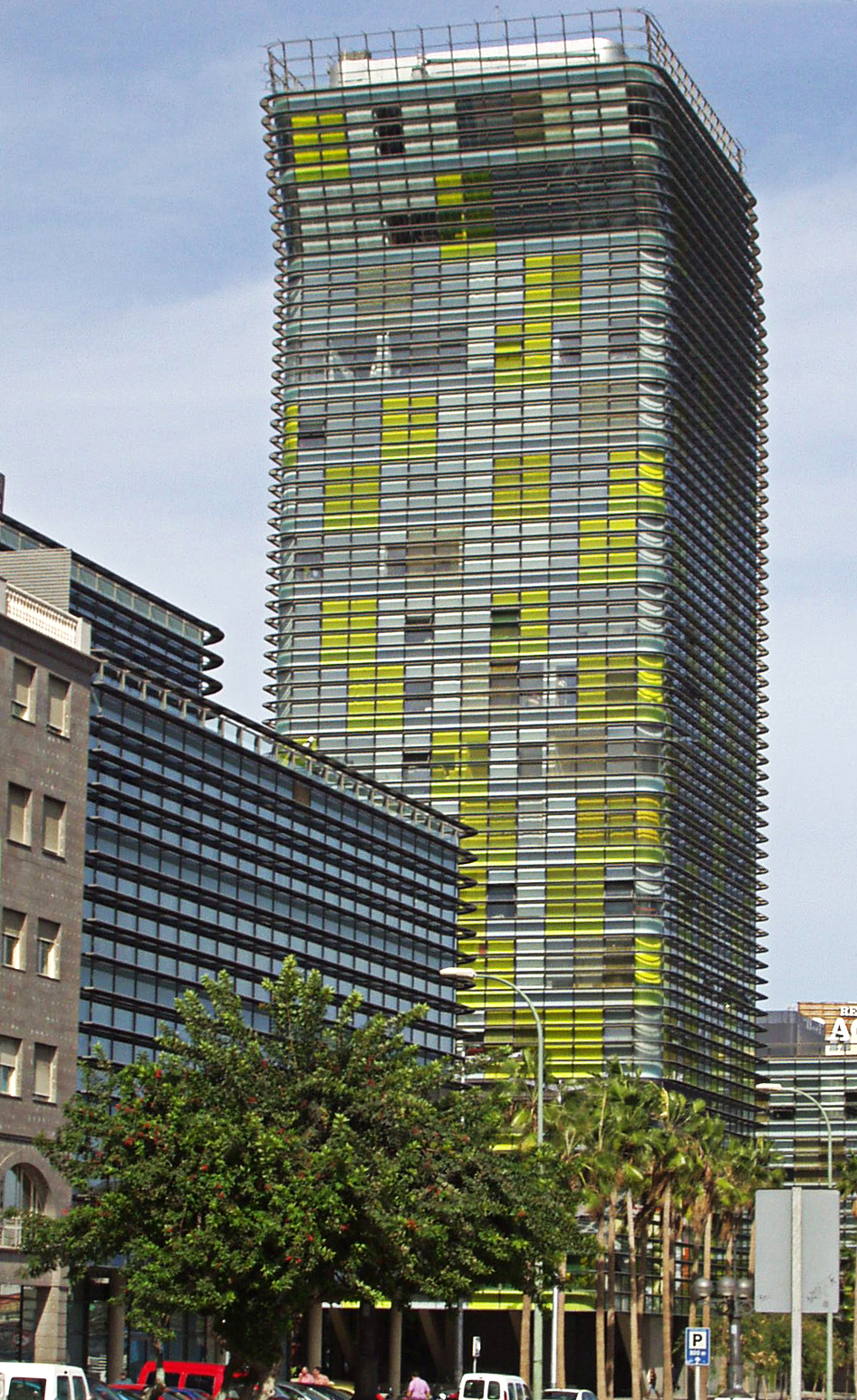
Torre Woermann in Las Palmas

Iñaki Ábalos (born 1956) is a Spanish architect and author.

== Life ==
Ábalos was born in 1956 in San Sebastián. He is a graduate of Superior Technical School of Architecture of Madrid, and from 2013 to 2016 he was Professor in Residence and Chair of the Department of Architecture at the Harvard University Graduate School of Design. He had also taught at Columbia University, the Architectural Association, Princeton University, and Cornell University.

Ábalos has stated that his favorite own design is Woermann Tower in Las Palmas, and names Kazuyo Sejima and Jacques Herzog among contemporaries producing interesting things.

== Published works ==
- The Good Life: A Guided Visit to the Houses of Modernity, Gustavo Gili, 2001.
- Tower and Office, From Modernist Theory to Contemporary Practice, MIT Press, 2003.
- Essays On Thermodynamics, Architecture and Beauty by Iñaki Ábalos (Author), Renata Snetkiewicz (Author), Lluis Ortega (Editor), 2015.
