= Palacio Insular de Tenerife =

Building in Santa Cruz de Tenerife, Spain

Coordinates: 28.4659°N 16.2471°W

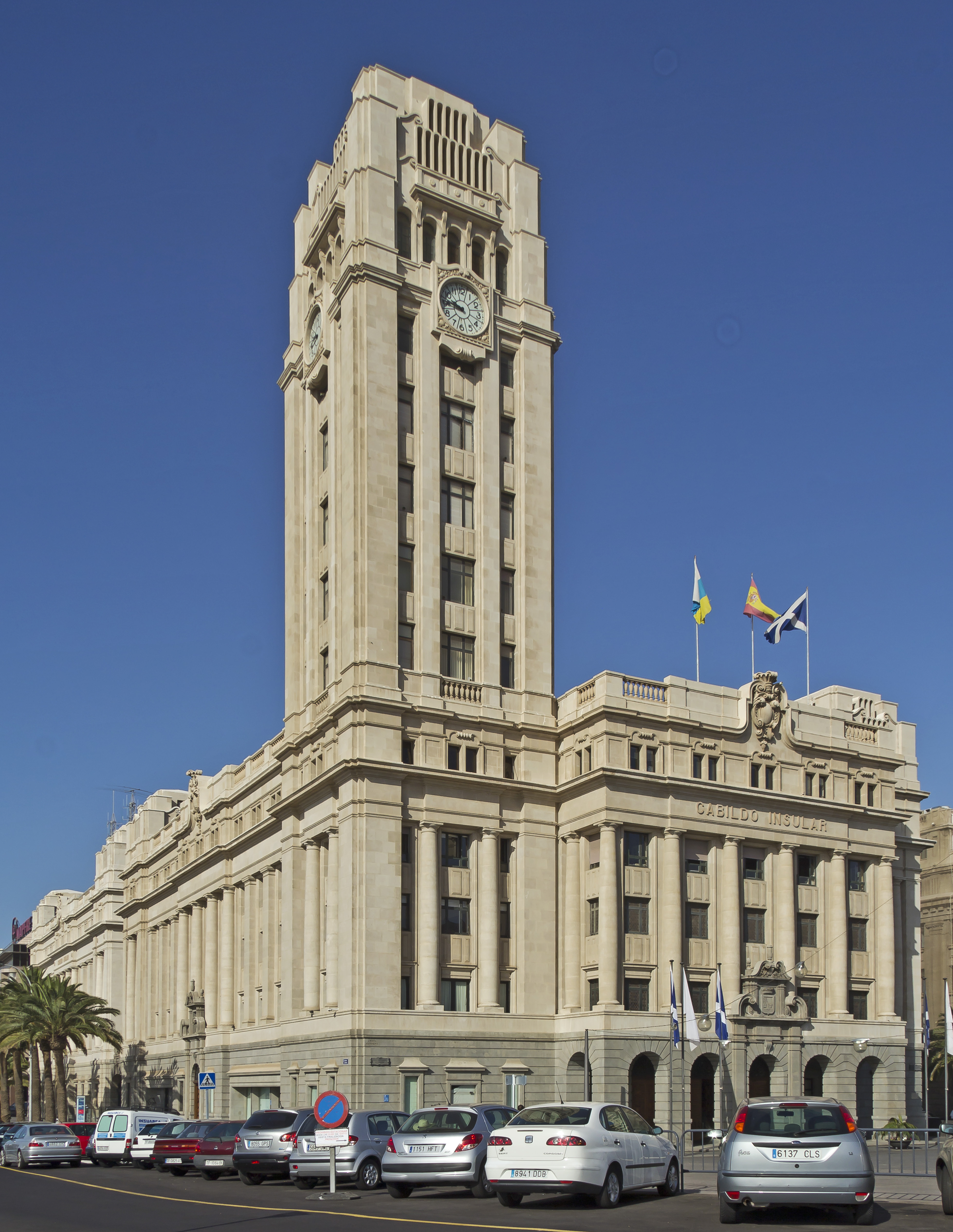
Palacio Insular de Tenerife

Palacio Insular de Tenerife (English: Insular Palace of Tenerife) is a building in the Spanish city of Santa Cruz de Tenerife, home of the Cabildo de Tenerife. Designed by the architect José Enrique Marrero Regalado, and executed between 1935 and 1940, it is located in the Plaza de España. The building stands out for its tower topped by a clock commissioned in 1950 and is one of the most recognizable symbols of the city of Santa Cruz de Tenerife.

The building project was the result of a contest that the County Council ruled in favor of the architect Enrique Marrero Regalado in 1934. The technician came to realize in collaboration with the architect Schneider four projects, two of which were monumental type and two rationalists; was elected the fourth solution, of great monumental packaging.

Works of art inside the building include the mural Salón Noble, designed by the Canarian painter José Aguiar. The project was signed in July 1934, beginning six months after the works, lasting jobs until 1940. "The breadth of the building made me think of reconciling its functions".

In January 2014 record for declaration of Site of cultural interest by the Government of the Canary Islands. In 2017 the entire building was declared as such.

== See also ==
- List of tallest buildings in Canary Islands
