= Island Council of Tenerife =

Governing body of Tenerife, Canary Islands

Coordinates: 28.4660°N 16.2471°W

- Cabildo Insular de Tenerife
- Logo

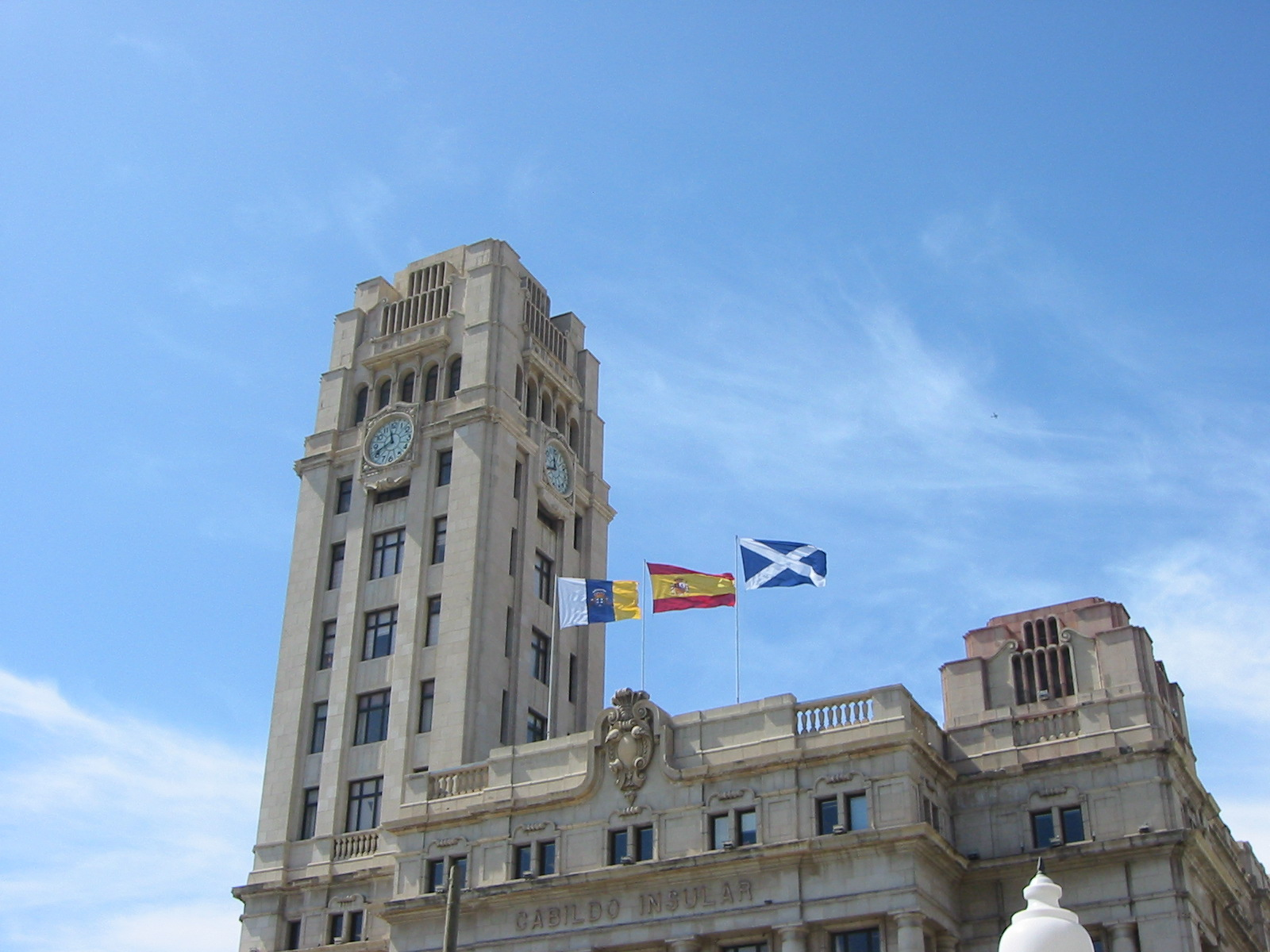
- View of the Insular Palace

Cabildo Insular overview
- Jurisdiction: Tenerife
- Headquarters: Insular Palace. Santa Cruz de Tenerife, Spain

Cabildo Insular de Tenerife (Island Council of Tenerife) is the governing body of the island of Tenerife (Canary Islands). It was established on 16 March 1913 in Santa Cruz de Tenerife, in a session held by the City Council. It was, at that time, the first corporation.

The Cabildo of Tenerife, like the other councils of the Canary Islands, enjoys a number of local powers as contained in the Statute of Autonomy of the Canaries. Other powers are delegated to the ministries of the territorial government.

== Offices ==
The Tenerife Town Hall originally served as the Santa Cruz de Tenerife City council building. In its first year the government transferred the offices to a building located at the intersection of the 25 de Julio Avenue and Numancia Street in the capital, Tinerfeña.

A later transfer moved the Town Hall support offices to Alfonso XII Street (currently Castillo Street), where they remained until 1928. In that year, offices were moved to several rented floors in a new building located directly opposite. Money had been set aside and plans made in 1920 for a new building, but it was not realized.

After ten years the first steps were taken to acquire land in the area of the Marítima Avenue and provide the corporation with a settled home. Negotiations began with the Ministry of Development for authorization. Construction of the development project in that part of the city began in 1933 under the direction of engineer, José Luis Escario.

The building was completed in late 1940 and the offices of the Santa Cruz de Tenerife were quickly filled. The new building, the Palacio Insular de Tenerife houses some departments of the Cabildo. Other decentralized offices are in different locations, as well as key offices elsewhere in the metropolitan area.

The building is notable for its great tower decorated with a clock, commissioned in 1950, which chimes hourly. It is a landmark in the city of Santa Cruz de Tenerife. The building contains an interesting collection of art, which includes murals that adorn the entire Salón Noble, popularly called the "Sistine Chapel of the Canary Islands." In addition there are paintings created in 1960 by painter José Aguiar.

In November 2011 these paintings were declared by the government to be of cultural interest to the Canaries.

== Internal organization ==
The Town Hall administration is made up of the following departments:

- Presidency
- Plenary Session
- Government Council
- Supervising Agencies
- Plenary Session Commissions
- Council of Spokesmen
- Political Groups

== Departments ==
The Island Council is composed of the following departments:

- Presidency
- Tourism and Planning
- Health, Relations with the University of La Laguna
- Sustainability, Territory and Environment
- Administration and Treasury
- Economy and Competitiveness
- Social Welfare, Education, Equality and Sport
- Roads, Municipal Co-operation and Housing
- Human Resources and Legal Defence Area
- Agriculture, Livestock, Fishing and Water
- Mobility and Security
- Culture, Heritage and Museums

== Responsibilities and Authority ==
According to article 43 of the LRJAPC, the exclusive responsibilities of the town hall are:

- The coordination of the municipal services of the island to guarantee its integral and suitable benefit to the entire insular territory, replacing the City Councils when the insufficiency of their resources prevents the provision of essential municipal services or established public functions in the LBRL.
- The attendance to and legal, economic and technical cooperation with the municipalities, especially with those of smaller economic capacity and management.
- The provision of supramunicipal public services.
- The approval of plans by insular offices for the provision of works and services in collaboration with the City Councils of each island. To achieve such, the city councils will make the work proposals that affect their municipal area, which should not be modified by the respective Town Hall, except with reasonable causes and a prior hearing with the affected city council.
- The promotion and administration of the peculiar interests of the island.

Law 14/1990, of 26 July, Legal Regime of the Public Administrations of the Canary Islands, transfers to the town halls the following competences:

- The territorial demarcations, alteration of terms and denomination of the municipalities, previous opinion of the Consultative Council of the Canary Islands.
- Own functions of the Agencies of Agrarian Extension.
- Experimental farms.
- Forest services, cattle routes and grass.
- Marine Aquacultures.
- Protection of the environment.
- Management and conservation of protected natural spaces, within the framework of established clause of autonomous sectoral legislation.
- Hunting
- Rural infrastructure of insular character.
- Subrogation of the municipal competences on city-planning, in conformity with the established clause of autonomous sectoral legislation.
- Highways, except those declared of regional interest, within the framework of the autonomous sectoral legislation. In the highways of regional interest, the operation, use and defence of sanctioning regimes.
- The management of ports of refuge, unless they are declared of regional interest.
- Hydraulic works that are not of regional or general interest. Hydraulic work – conservation and policing of insular terrestrial water administration in the terms established by autonomous sectoral legislation.
- Transports by highway and cable. Railroads, in the framework within which it has autonomous sectoral legislation.
- Fairs and markets.
- Policing of spectacles.
- Promotion and policing of the insular tourism, except for the powers of inspection and sanction.
- Annoying, unhealthy, injurious and dangerous activities.
- Policing of houses.
- Conservation and administration of public parks.
- Administration of the residences of students established in the island.
- The promotion of culture, sports, occupation, leisure and relaxation in the insular scope.
- The conservation and administration of the insular historical-artistic patrimony.
- Museums, libraries and archives that are not reserved by the Independent Community.
- Promotion of crafts.
- Social attendance and social services.
- Defense of the consumer.
- Campaigns on animal health.

== Current president ==
The current president is Rosa Dávila. Representing the Coalición Canaria party, she is the first woman to ever hold the position.

== See also ==
- ALiX Project
