= Woermann Tower =

Skyscraper in Canary Islands

Coordinates: 28.1456°N 15.4298°W

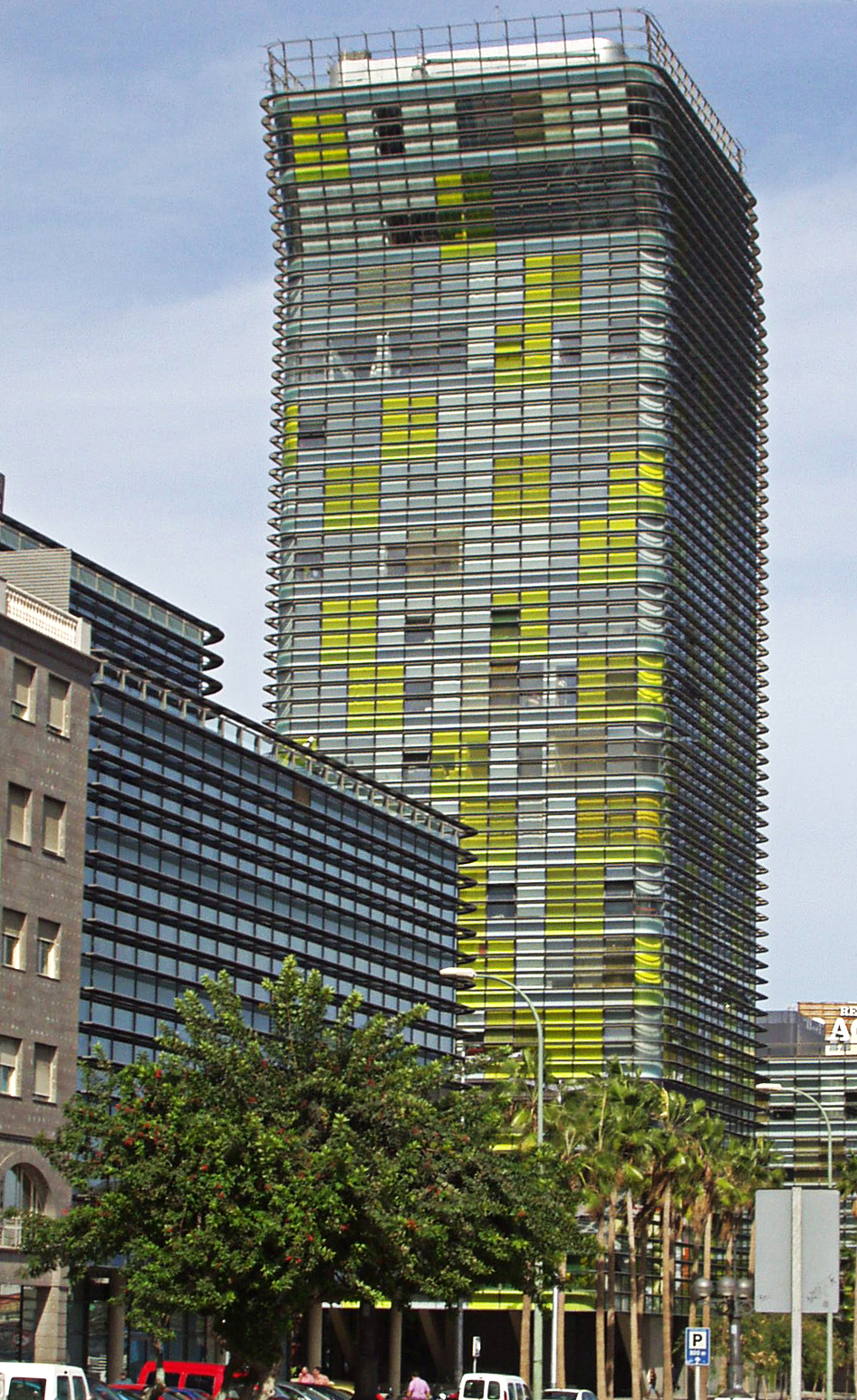
- Interactive map of the Woermann Tower area
- Alternative names: Ferrovial Torre

General information
- Type: Residential, library
- Location: Las Palmas, Spain
- Construction started: 2001
- Completed: April 2005
- Cost: €10,338,900
- Client: Ferrovial Inmobiliaria

Height
- Height: 76 metres (249 ft)

Technical details
- Floor count: 18

Design and construction
- Architects: Abalos & Herreros, Joaquin Casariego and Elsa Guerra
- Structural engineer: Obiol y Moya

Woermann Tower also Torre Woermann is a mixed-use tower in Las Palmas on Gran Canaria, Canary Islands, Spain. Completed in 2005, the tower was designed by Abalos & Herreros in collaboration with Joaquin Casariego and Elsa Guerra, and built by Ferrovial Inmobiliaria, the company also built around the same time one of the two Torres de Santa Cruz, in the city of Santa Cruz de Tenerife. The Woermann Tower forms part of a complex which includes a public square, constructed using Portuguese stone with the artist Albert Oehlen, and a seven-storey block to the south, containing retail units and offices.

The ground floor contains a main entrance area and retail units whilst the first floor contains a library. The floors above contain apartments, usually four or five per floor. The floor slabs are separated by 3.6 m (12 ft), offering views over the Atlantic Ocean through the 2,000 m^{2} (21,528 sq ft) glass facade. The facade is protected from the sun by solar fins running horizontally around the building, with vegetable motifs etched into the glass. Yellow colour inserts were placed in the windows in strategic locations on the facade.

== See also ==
- List of tallest buildings in Canary Islands
