= ALiX Project =

Proposal from the Cabildo de Tenerife

Proyecto ALiX ALiX Project
- Industry: Telecommunications
- Founded: 2006
- Founder: Ricardo Melchior; Carlos Alonso
- Headquarters: Tenerife, Spain
- Website: ALiX Project

The ALiX project is a proposal from the Cabildo de Tenerife (Council of Tenerife), led by the Instituto Tecnológico y de Energías Renovables (Technological Institute and of Renewable Energies), with the purpose of promoting the competitiveness of the island of Tenerife towards the global market of the information and communication technologies and improving the technological resources in the Canary Islands. In order to do so, four courses of action have been suggested:

- Development and implementation of a data center in Tenerife, (D-ALiX, formerly NAPWACI: Neutral Access Point of Western Africa and Canary Islands), that will serve as a neutral point of traffic aggregation and distribution for three continents, in addition to a gateway for the South of Europe.
- Constitution of a public carrier, dependent on the Cabildo de Tenerife, that will negotiate the terrestrial infrastructures upon the guidance of the Cabildo and, at the same time, new construction statements are agreed, putting them at the disposal of all carriers in order to promote competitiveness.
- Participation of the Technological Institute of Telecommunications of Tenerife (IT^{3}) in the installation and implementation of an alternative submarine cable in competitiveness with the main telecommunications carrier.
- Promotion, through the Technological Institute of Telecommunications of Tenerife, of the arrival of new submarine cables which will link the island with Africa and, in the future, with Latin America.

Included in the initiative of the ALiX Project is the D-ALiX (formerly NAPWACI). This high availability data center is situated in the island of Tenerife (Canary Islands). The data center was awarded in the Datacenter Dynamics Awards 2010 ceremony due to its innovation.
