= Abalos & Herreros =

Spanish architectural firm

Abalos & Herreros is an architectural firm founded by Inaki Abalos (b. 1956) and Juan Herreros (b. 1958) in Madrid, Spain. The founders were involved in the last throes of La Movida Madrileña and later produced a 1997 monograph called Areas of Impunity. They are known for their playful writing and an interest in industrial methods of building. The office split into two Madrid-based offices in 2008. Immediately Juan Herreros' office won a number of important international open competitions, with the new Munch Museum in Oslo being the most important of them. The museum faced substantial backlash in Norway, with critics labeling the design unsightly and noting a stark departure from the original competition renderings. The head of the selection jury admitted they probably wouldn't have picked Abalos & Herreros if they had known how the building would eventually turn out. The building won a national prize as the ugliest building in Norway in 2021.

== Works ==
- Parque Europa, Palencia (1991–98)
- Gordillo House, Madrid (1996)
- Drawings for the Villa FG, Madrid (1999)
- Valdemingomez Waste Treatment Centre, Madrid (2000)
- Village Hall, Colmenarejo (2000)
- Environmental Education Center and offices, Arico, Tenerife (2001)
- Jose Hierro Public Library, Usera (2003)
- Design for Coast Park, Barcelona (2004)
- Woermann Tower, Las Palmas (2005)
- Munch/Stenersen, Bjørvika, Oslo, Norway (2009)

== Publications ==
- Tower and Office, From Modernist Theory to Contemporary Practice, MIT Press, 2003.
