= Munch/Stenersen =

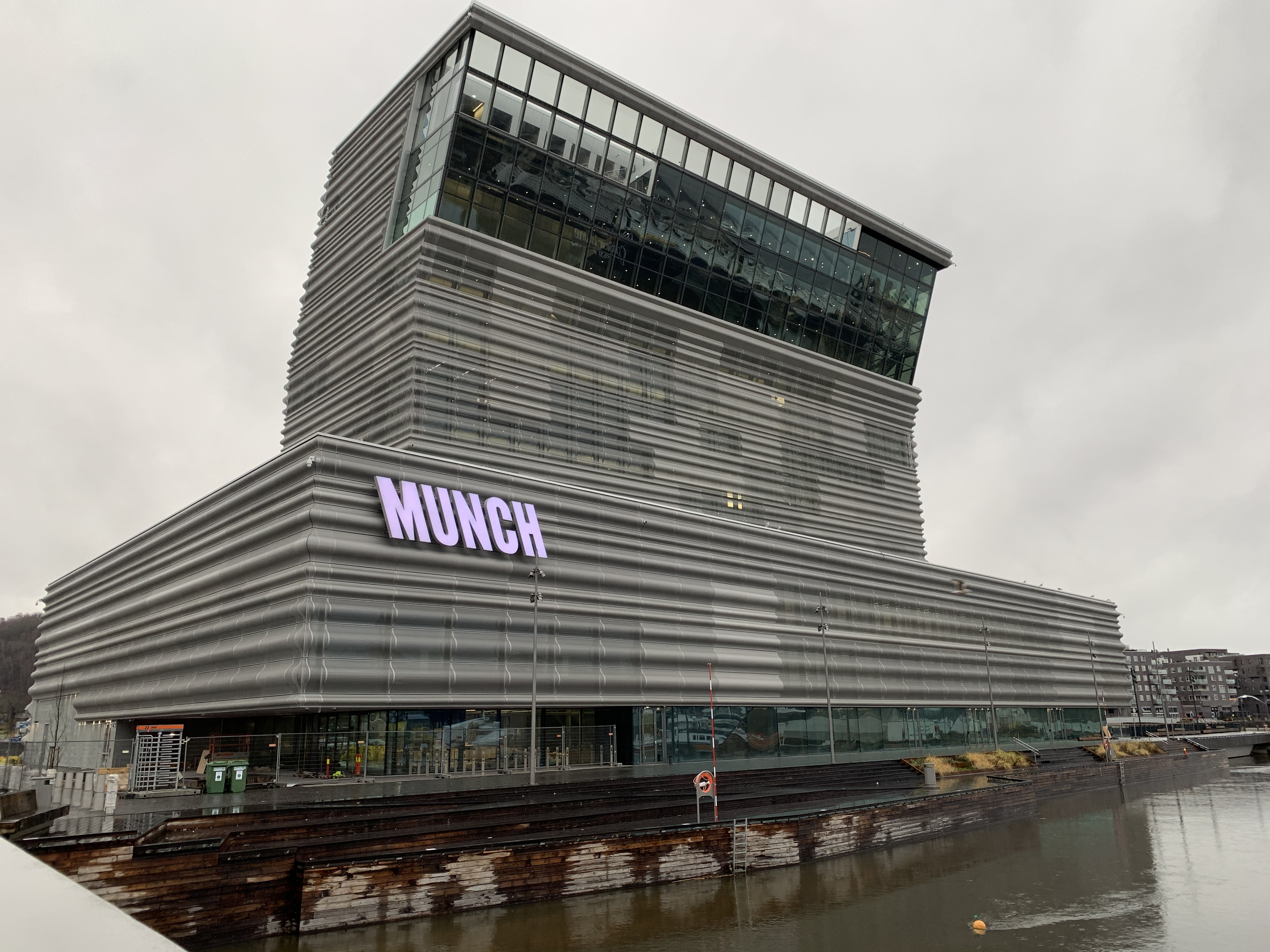

General information
- Type: Arts complex
- Architectural style: Modernist
- Location: Oslo, Norway
- Coordinates: 59°54′21″N 10°45′19″E
- Completed: 2020
- Opened: 22 October 2021

Design and construction
- Architect: Juan Herreros
- Main contractor: Abalos & Herreros

Munch/Stenersen (Norwegian: Munchmuseet) is a building in Bjørvika, Oslo completed in 2020. The building was designed by Juan Herreros (Abalos & Herreros). There has been a lot of conflict around the building, considering both its design, functionality and height (14 floors/46 meters). The building lies next to the Oslo Opera building together with the upcoming Oslo Public Library complexes. The building is called "Lambda" by the architect/designer.
