= List of tallest buildings in Canary Islands =

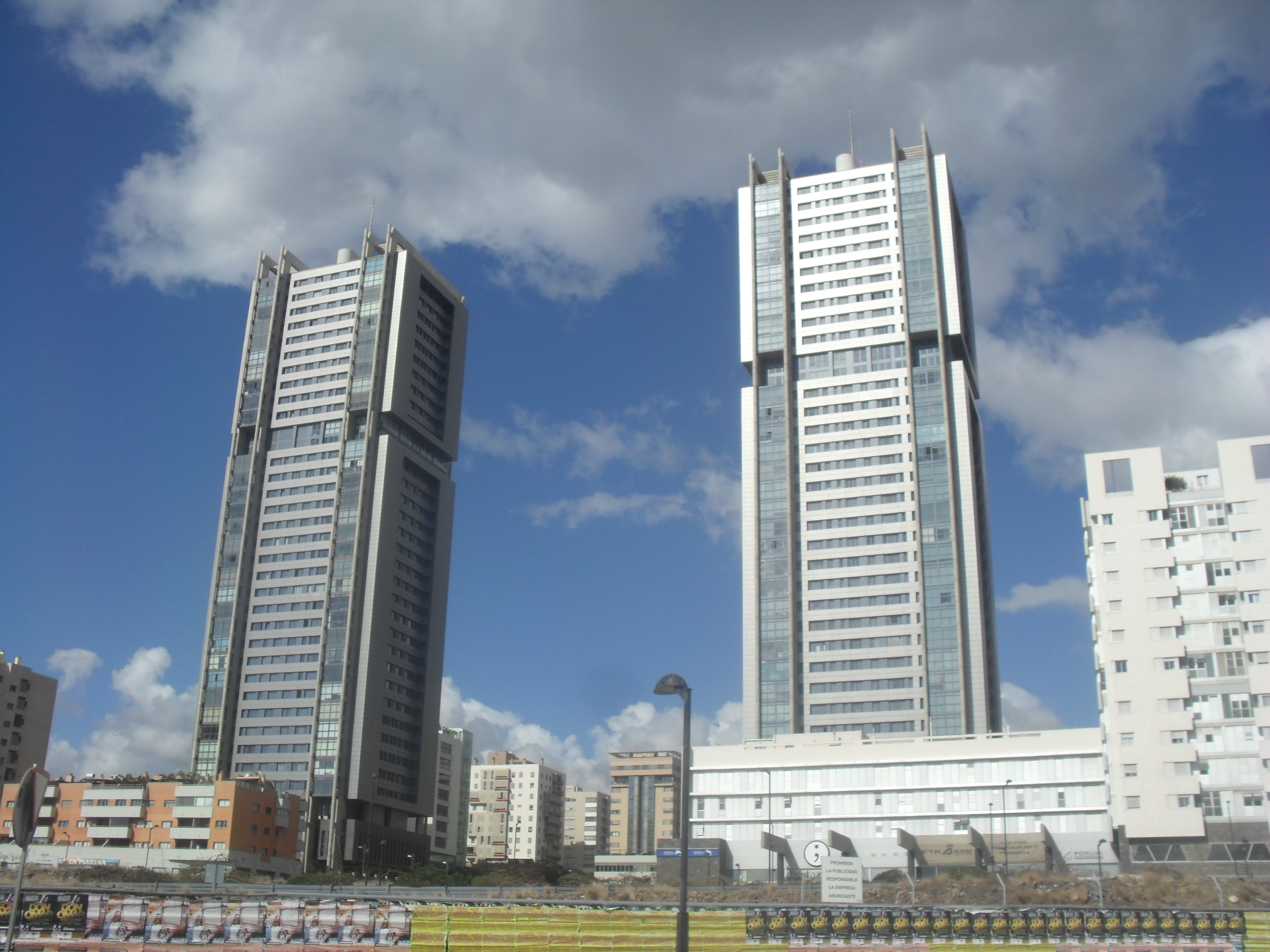
Torres de Santa Cruz in Santa Cruz de Tenerife, currently the tallest buildings in the Canary Islands and the tallest twin towers in Spain.

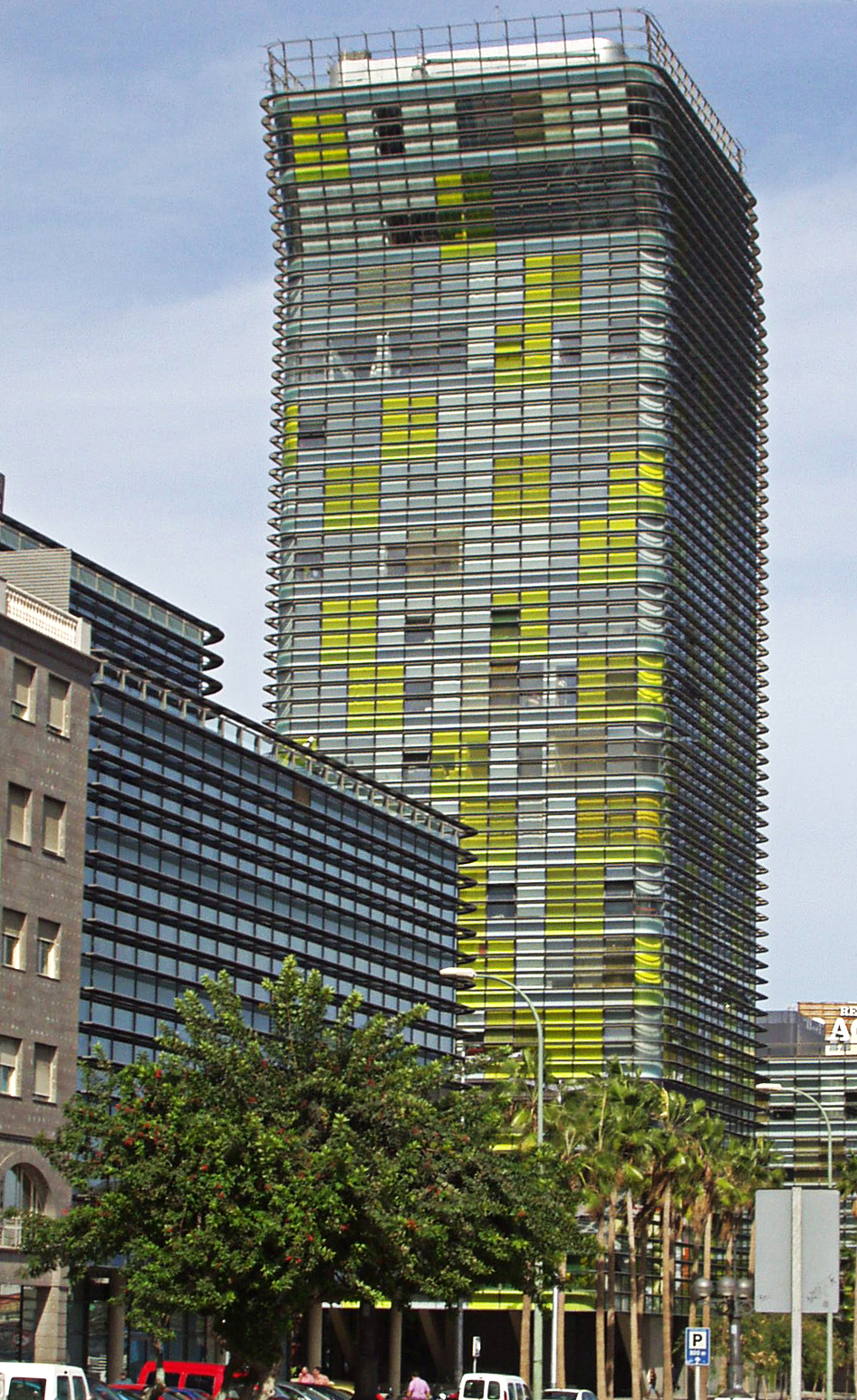
Torre Woermann, one of the tallest and most emblematic buildings of Las Palmas de Gran Canaria.

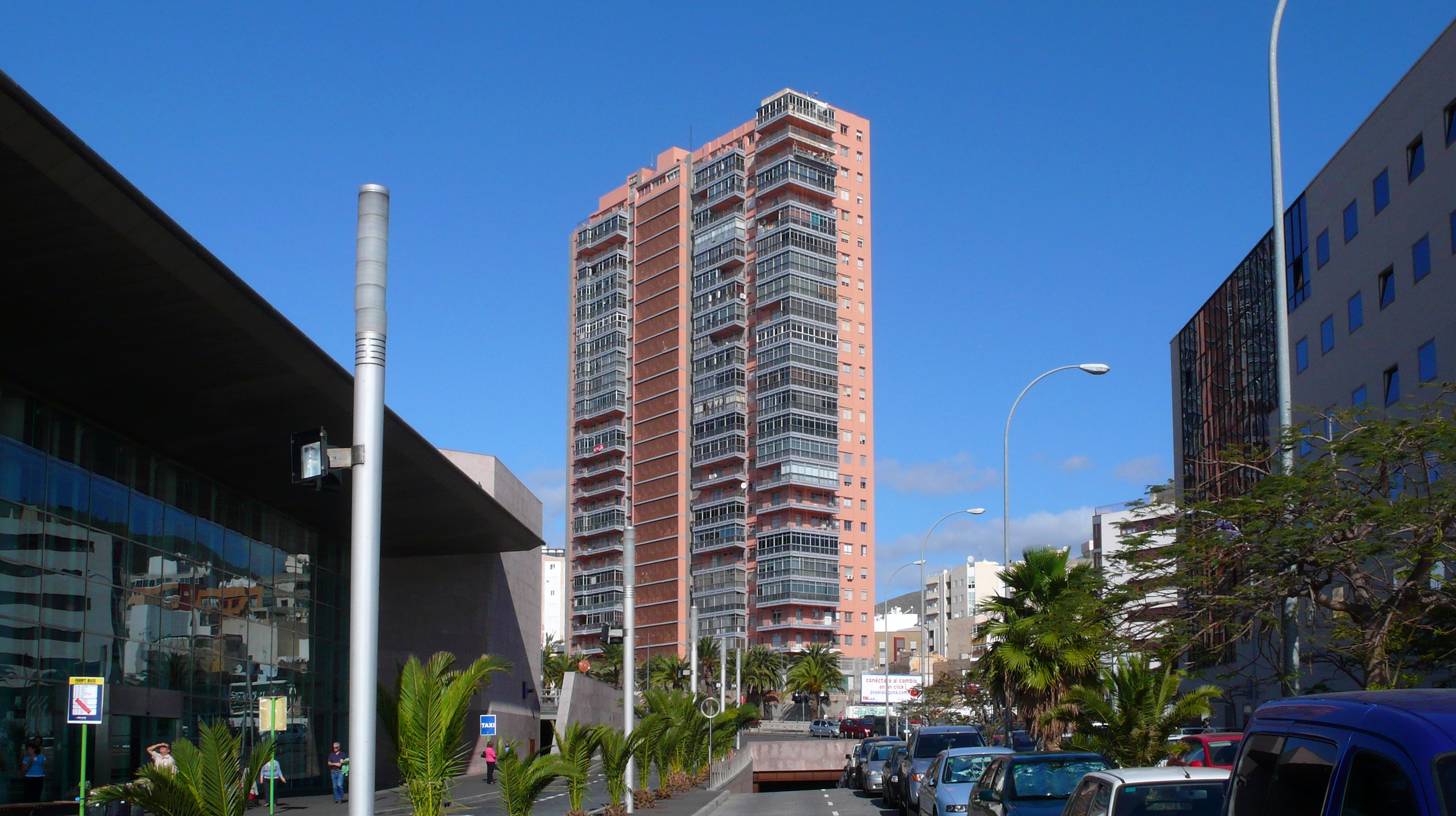
Rascacielos de la avenida Tres de Mayo, Santa Cruz de Tenerife.

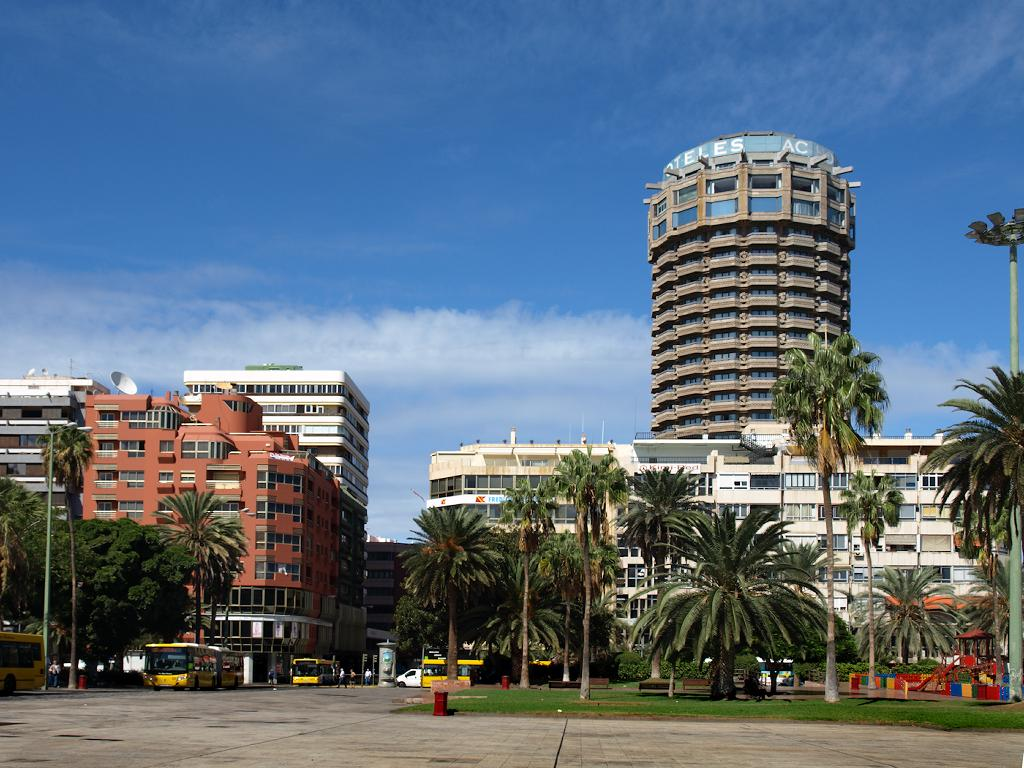
Hotel AC, Las Palmas de Gran Canaria.

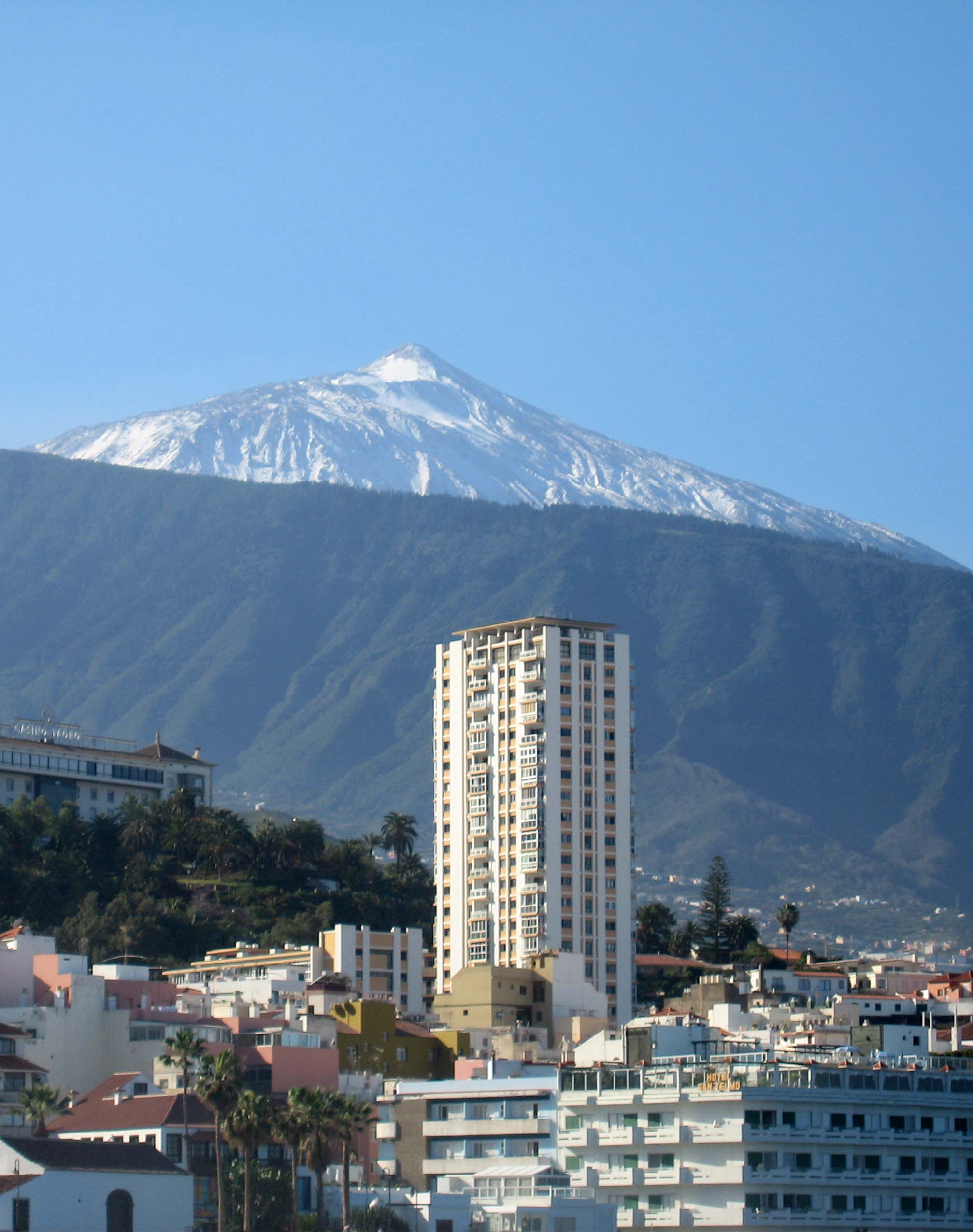
Edificio Bel Air, Puerto de la Cruz.

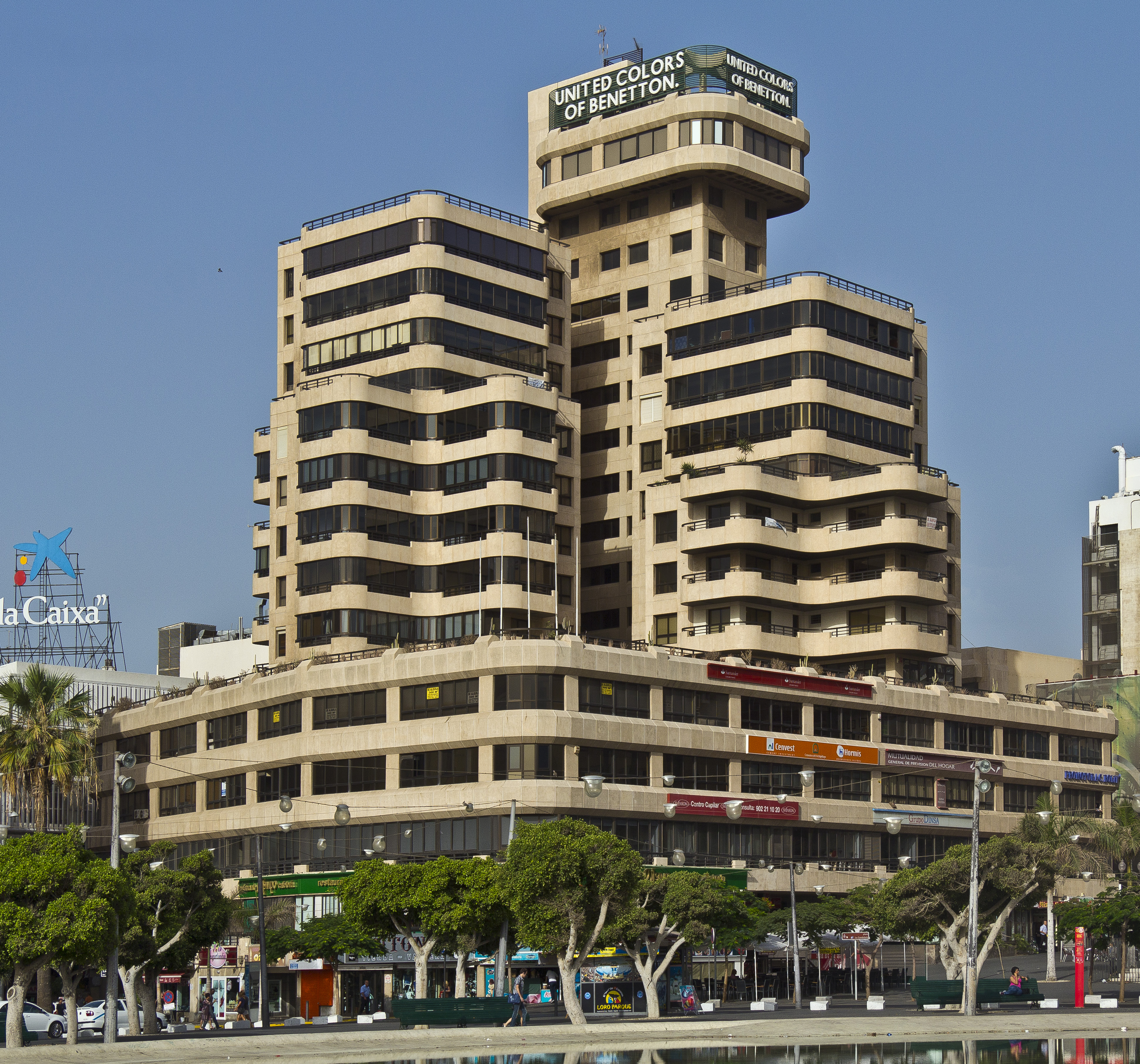
Edificio Olympo, Santa Cruz de Tenerife.

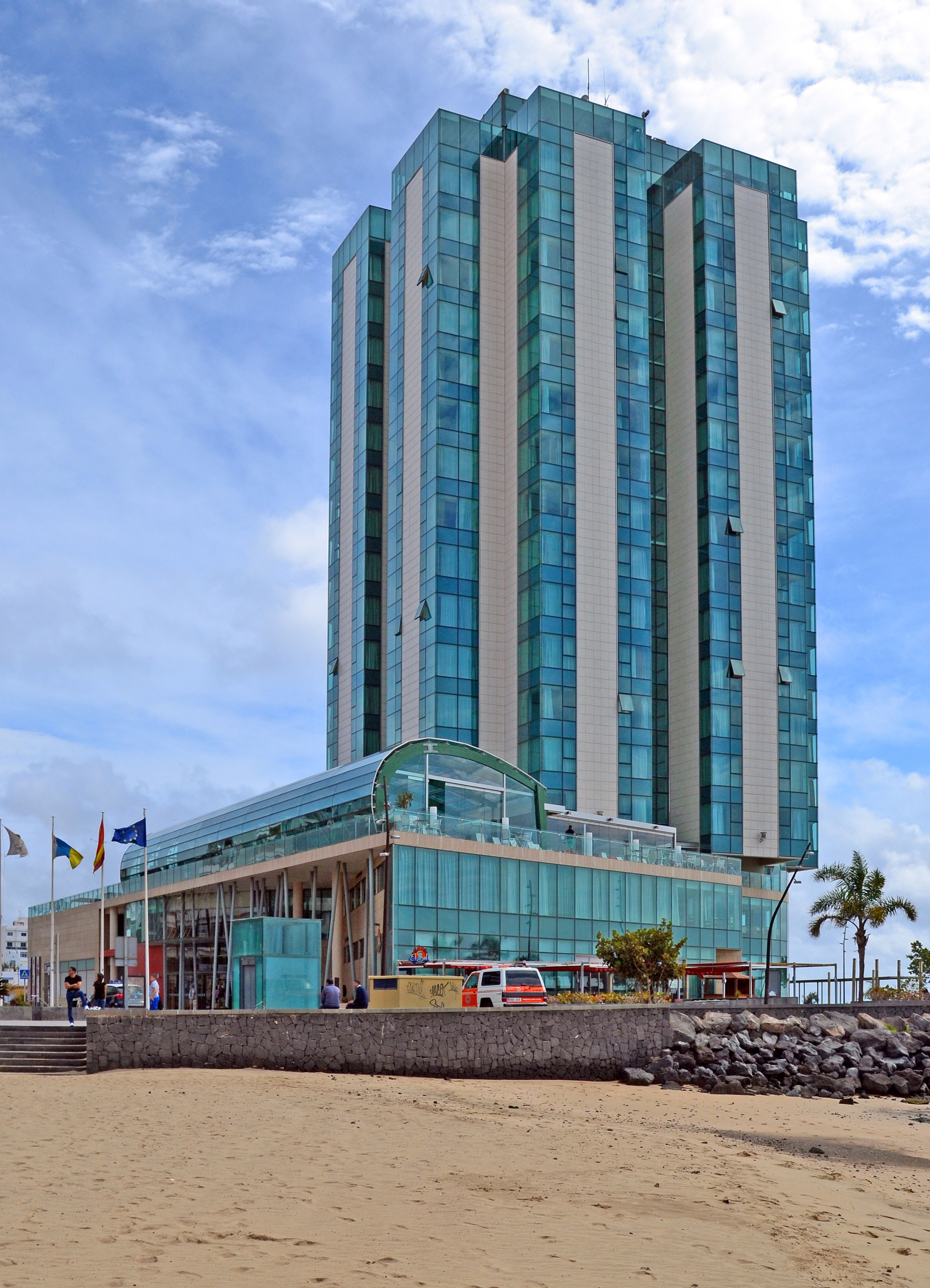
Gran Hotel, the tallest building in Arrecife.

This list orders the highest skyscrapers of the Canary Islands (Spain). At present, the tallest building in the Canary Islands is the complex of the Torres de Santa Cruz, located in the city of Santa Cruz de Tenerife, with 120 meters high are the tallest twin towers in Spain. The second tallest building in the archipelago after these two towers, is the Yaiza I Tower, 105 meters high and located in Las Palmas de Gran Canaria.

== Tallest buildings ==
List of skyscrapers with more than 50m. of the Canary Islands, although the total of tall buildings in the two Canarian capitals according to Emporis.com data is: 17 in Santa Cruz de Tenerife and 15 in Las Palmas de Gran Canaria.

Rank	Name	Maximum height (without antennas)	City
1	Torre Santa Cruz I	120 m	Santa Cruz de Tenerife
1	Torre Santa Cruz II	120 m	Santa Cruz de Tenerife
3	Torre Yaiza I	105 m	Las Palmas de Gran Canaria
4	Torre Yaiza II	95 m	Las Palmas de Gran Canaria
5	Edificio Solyvista	88 m	Las Palmas de Gran Canaria
6	Rascacielos de la avenida Tres de Mayo	85 m	Santa Cruz de Tenerife
7	AC Hotel	84 m	Las Palmas de Gran Canaria
7	Torres del Pino I	84 m	Las Palmas de Gran Canaria
7	Torres del Pino II	84 m	Las Palmas de Gran Canaria
10	Edificio América	77 m	Las Palmas de Gran Canaria
11	Torre Woermann	76 m	Las Palmas de Gran Canaria
12	Edificio Bel Air	75 m	Puerto de la Cruz
13	Edificio Azor	74 m	Las Palmas de Gran Canaria
13	Edificio Granca	74 m	Las Palmas de Gran Canaria
13	Edificio Hernández Talavera	74 m	Las Palmas de Gran Canaria
16	Edificio Amaco	70 m	Las Palmas de Gran Canaria
16	Edificio Basconia	70 m	Las Palmas de Gran Canaria
16	Edificio Juan Amador	70 m	Santa Cruz de Tenerife
16	Torre Las Palmas	70 m	Las Palmas de Gran Canaria
20	Hotel Bouganville Playa	65 m	Arona
20	Hotel Maritím I	65 m	Los Realejos
20	Hotel Club Paríso	65 m	Adeje
20	Hotel Paríso Floral	65 m	Adeje
20	Hotel Oásis Paríso	65 m	Adeje
25	Edificio Central	63 m	Las Palmas de Gran Canaria
25	Edificio Av. Néstor	63 m	Las Palmas de Gran Canaria
25	Edificio Joaquín Blume	63 m	Las Palmas de Gran Canaria
28	Edificio Costamar	62 m	Arona
29	Hotel Princesa Dácil	60 m	Arona
30	Corona Roja	59 m	San Bartolomé de Tirajana
31	Luabay Tenerife	58 m	Puerto de la Cruz
31	Torres del Sol I	58 m	Arona
31	Torres del Sol II	58 m	Arona
34	Edificio Olympo	57 m	Santa Cruz de Tenerife
34	Los Tajinastes II	57 m	Arona
36	Faro de Maspalomas	56 m	San Bartolomé de Tirajana
36	Edificio Mesa y López	56 m	Las Palmas de Gran Canaria
38	Hotel Las Vegas	54 m	Puerto de la Cruz
38	Torre del Mar	54 m	Santa Cruz de Tenerife
38	Edificio Botavara	54 m	El Rosario
38	El Corte Inglés 3 Mayo	54 m	Santa Cruz de Tenerife
38	Gran Hotel	54 m	Arrecife
38	Edificio Jardín Mar	54 m	El Rosario
44	Edificio Zárate I	53 m	Las Palmas de Gran Canaria
44	Edificio Zárate II	53 m	Las Palmas de Gran Canaria
44	Edificio Zárate III	53 m	Las Palmas de Gran Canaria
47	Los Verodes	52 m	Santa Cruz de Tenerife
47	Edificio Natacha	52 m	Santa Cruz de Tenerife
47	Santander Central Hispano	52 m	Santa Cruz de Tenerife
50	Hotel Oro Negro	51 m	Puerto de la Cruz
50	Teneguía	51 m	Puerto de la Cruz
50	Edificio Daida	51 m	Santa Cruz de Tenerife
50	Ministerio de Trabajo	51 m	Santa Cruz de Tenerife
50	Edificio Ciudad Mar	51 m	Santa Cruz de Tenerife
55	Hotel Maritím II	50 m	Los Realejos
55	Edificio Teide	50 m	Santa Cruz de Tenerife
55	Edificio Mulhacén	50 m	Santa Cruz de Tenerife
55	Palacio Insular de Tenerife	50 m	Santa Cruz de Tenerife
55	Viña del Mar	50 m	Arona
55	Valle Luz I	50 m	Puerto de la Cruz
55	A Ponerosa	50 m	Arona
55	Hotel Gran Tinerfe	50 m	Arona
55	Aparthotel Panorámica Gardens	50 m	Los Realejos
55	Faro Punta del Hidalgo	50 m	San Cristóbal de La Laguna
