= Gran Hotel (Arrecife) =

Skyscraper in the Canary Islands

Arrecife Gran Hotel & Spa
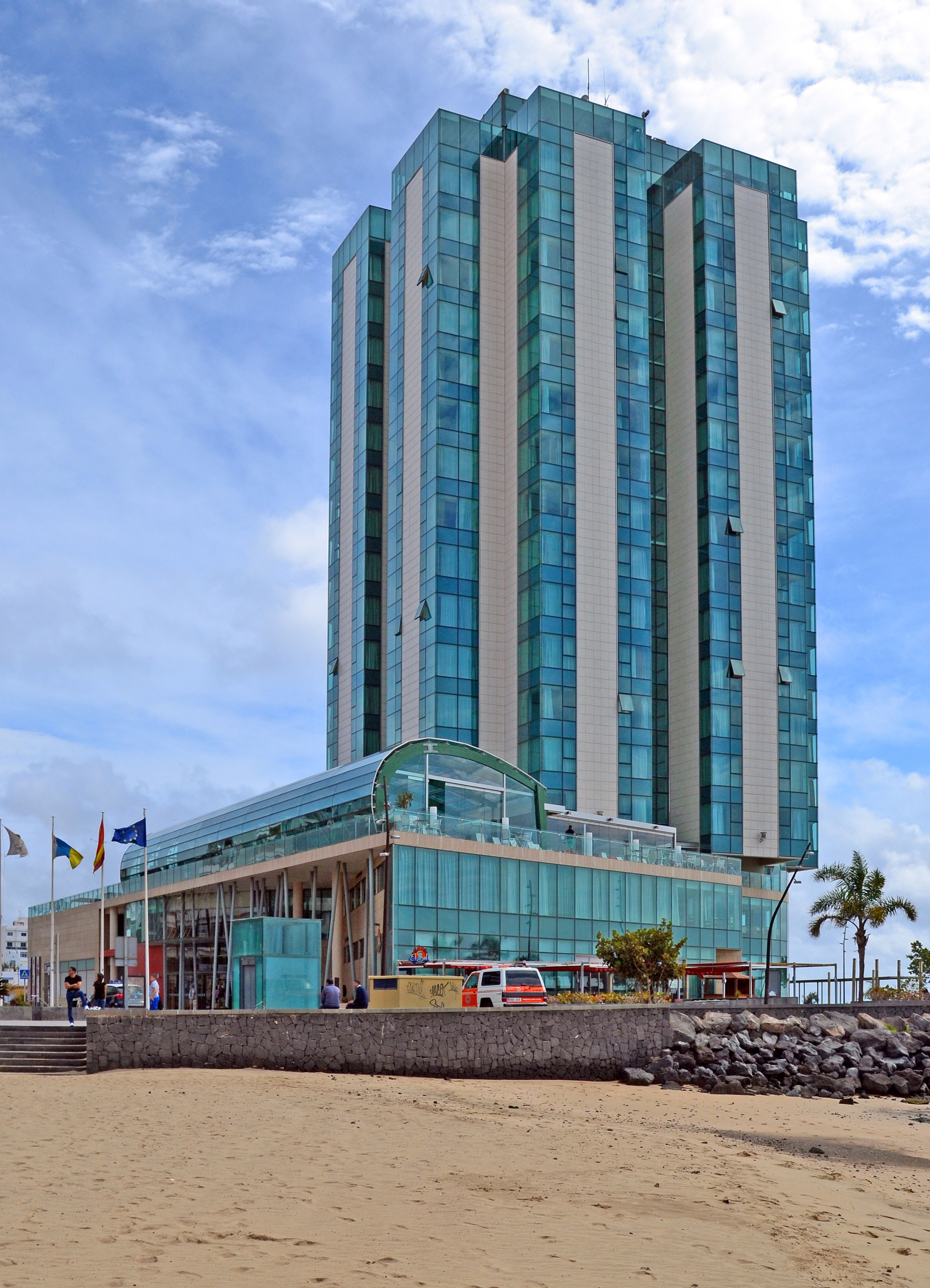
- Interactive map of the Arrecife Gran Hotel & Spa area

General information
- Status: Completed
- Type: Hotel
- Location: Arrecife, Spain

Height
- Height: 54 m (177 ft)

Technical details
- Floor count: 15

The Arrecife Gran Hotel & Spa better known as Gran Hotel, is a skyscraper in the city of Arrecife (Canary Islands, Spain). It is the tallest building on the island of Lanzarote at 54 meters tall and 15 floors (above ground).

== Overview ==
Completed in 1974, it is located at the end of Maritime Avenue of Arrecife by the sea and Playa de El Reducto. The building functions as a 5-star hotel and its height also makes it the tallest building in the Canary Islands outside of Tenerife and Gran Canaria.

== Restoration ==
In November 1994, the building suffered a fire which caused no fatalities because it was empty. The fire originated at 6 pm on the ground floor of the building and quickly spread to the upper floors. Although the structure of the building was not damaged, some time later the façade was restored and modernized with a steel and glass roof.

== See also ==
- Gran Hotel Bali
- List of tallest buildings in Canary Islands
