= Rascacielos de la avenida Tres de Mayo =

Skyscraper in the Canary Islands

Coordinates: 28°27′37″N 16°15′11″W

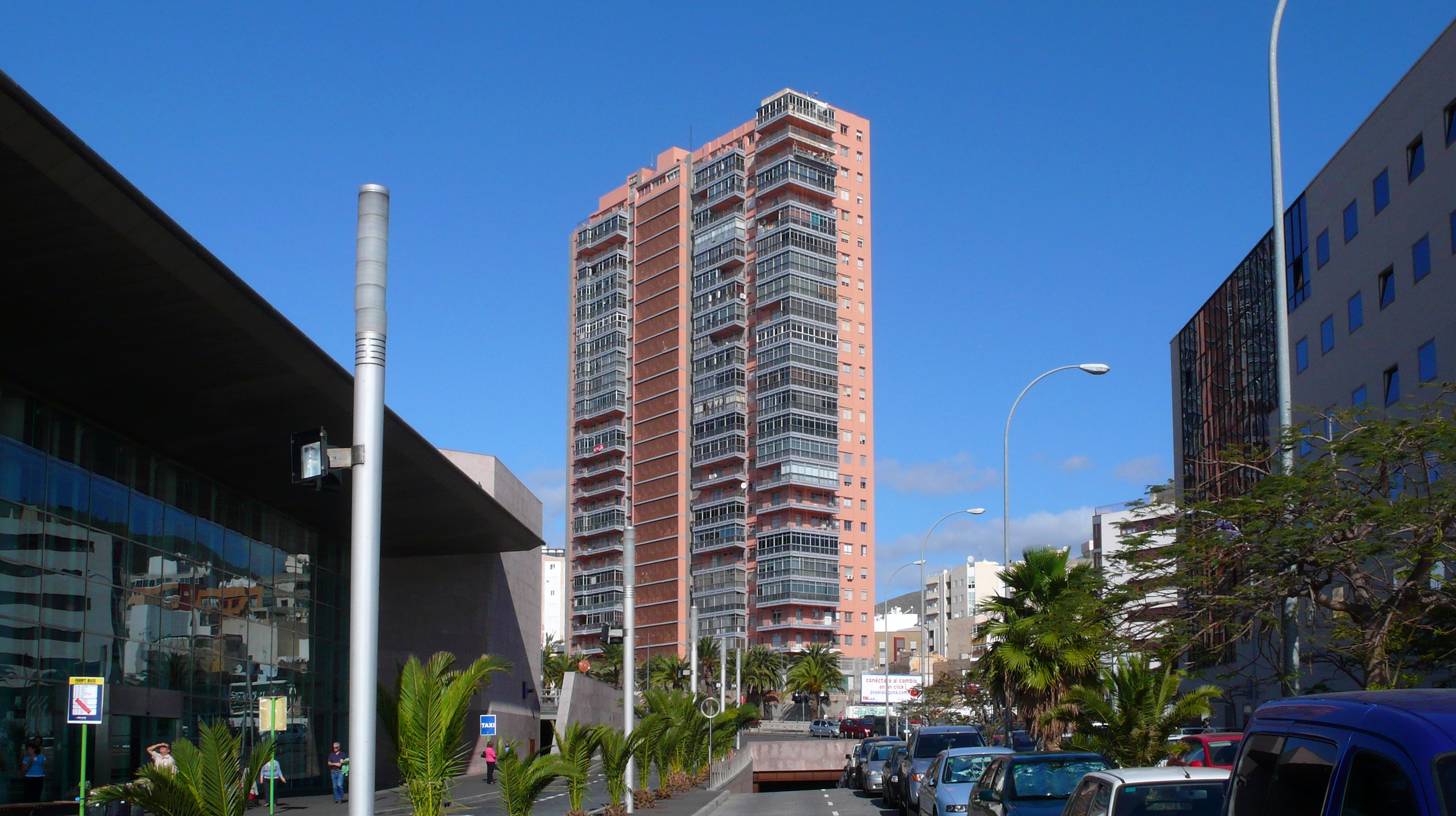
- Interactive map of the Rascacielos de la avenida Tres de Mayo area

General information
- Status: Completed
- Location: Santa Cruz, Spain
- Completed: 3 May 1974

Height
- Height: 85 m (279 ft)

Technical details
- Floor count: 24

Design and construction
- Architect: Carmelo Rodríguez Borrella

The Rascacielos de la avenida Tres de Mayo is a skyscraper in the city of Santa Cruz on the Tenerife, Canary Islands, Spain, located on Avenida Tres de Mayo.

It was designed by Carmelo Rodríguez Borrella and was inaugurated on 3 May 1974. At 85 m high with 24 storeys it was the tallest building in the city until the construction of the Torres de Santa Cruz. Today is still a symbolic building in the city of Santa Cruz de Tenerife.

== See also ==
- List of tallest buildings in Canary Islands
