= José Pinazo Martínez =

Spanish painter (1879–1933)

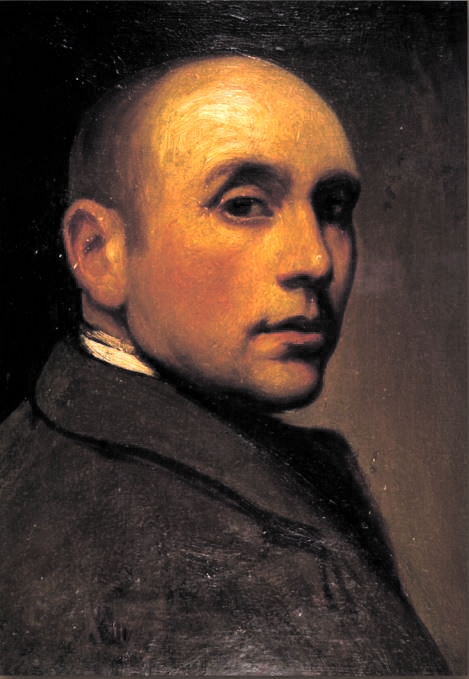
- Self-portrait (1904)
- Born: José Pinazo Martínez; 10 July 1879; Rome, Italy
- Died: 2 December 1933 (aged 54); Madrid, Spain

José Pinazo Martínez (10 July 1879, Rome – 2 December 1933, Madrid) was a Spanish painter, primarily known for portraits and still-lifes.

== Biography ==
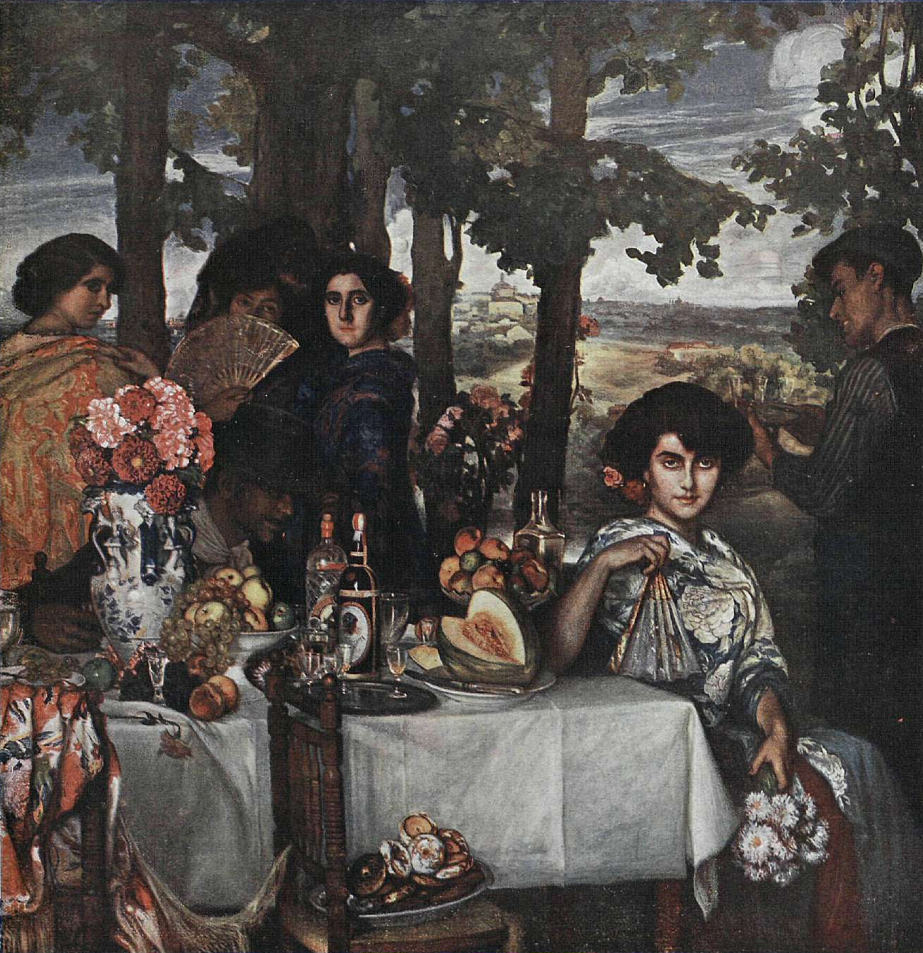
A Full Life

He was born while his father, the painter Ignacio Pinazo Camarlench, was on a scholarship in Rome. At the age of two, they returned to Spain and settled in Valencia where his brother, the sculptor, Ignacio Pinazo Martínez, was born in 1883.

As the son of an artist, he naturally became interested in painting at an early age and began studying with his father. Then he attended the Real Academia de Bellas Artes de San Carlos de Valencia. In 1895, when he was only sixteen, he entered his first work in the National Exhibition of Fine Arts and received honorable mention. He also won a silver medal at the Exposition Universelle (1900). Later, he moved to Madrid to pursue his career. In 1906, he spent his time traveling between Paris, London and Rome. The following year, he married Magdalena Mitjans, from an old and once noble family. They had two daughters.

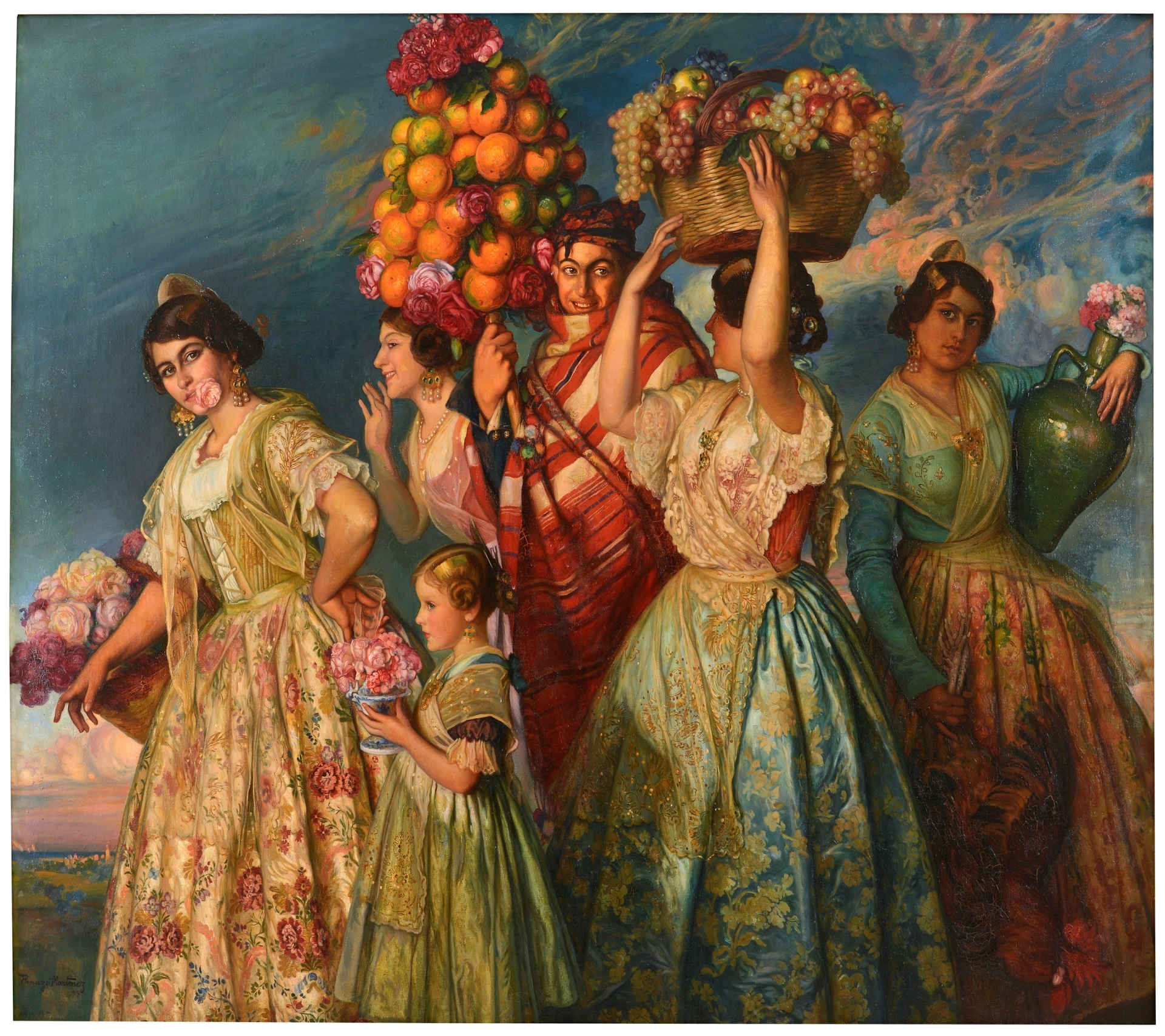
Floreal; 1915, 160 x 187 cm, Prado Museum.

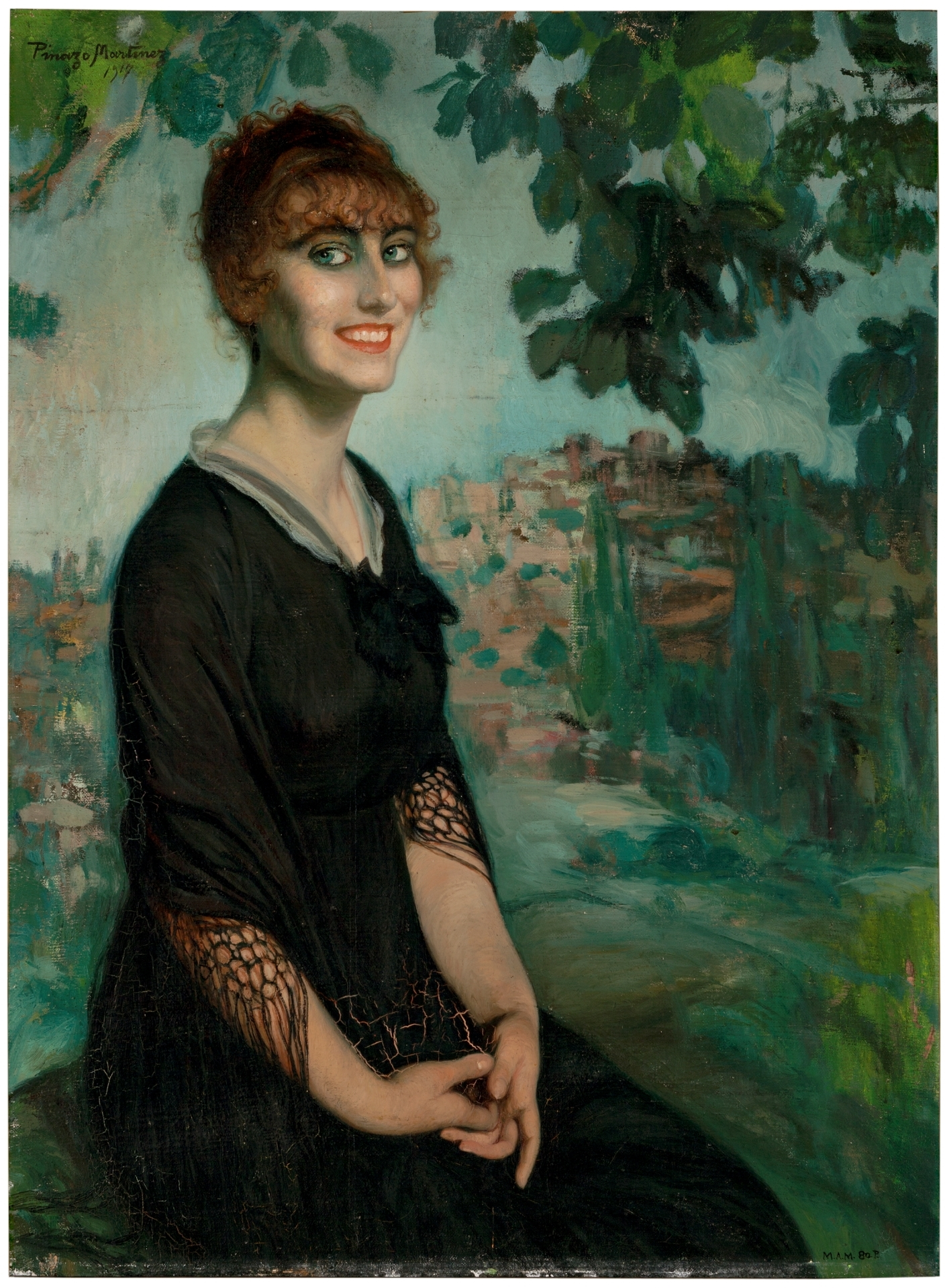
Firefly; 1917, 93 x 69 cm, Prado Museum.

In Madrid, he received appreciative notices from several prominent critics, including Manuel Abril and José Francés. The latter, under his pen name of "Silvio Lago", wrote an article for La Esfera, expressing his belief that Pinazo had reached his artistic maturity in 1910 with his painting "A Plena Vida" (A Full Life). In 1915, Pinazo was awarded a First Class prize at the National Exhibition for his large canvas "Floreal", for which Magdalena served as a model and helped select the costumes. He participated in several international exhibitions; notably in Panama and St. Louis.

Around 1918, Pinazo Martínez made significant changes in his style by moving away from themes of modernism, naturalism and costumbrism, and employing a more simplistic approach. In 1920, he visited the United States, but had little success until Magdalena was able to arrange a showing in New York at the Gimpel and Wildenstein gallery. The following year, he made an extended visit to Cuba, for a showing at the Salón de Bellas Artes de La Habana, after which he received several commissions.

In 1925, he held his last solo exhibition in Madrid, preferring to focus on foreign buyers; primarily in Buenos Aires. He received a major commission from Archer Milton Huntington, for the Hispanic Society of America, in 1929. Small showings followed at the Carnegie Institute (1930) and the Art Institute of Chicago (1931).

In the summer of 1933, while vacationing at El Escorial, he became ill with what was diagnosed as anthrax. As the weather grew colder, he developed sepsis, which proved fatal.

Change in Pinazo Martinez's style after 1918 reflected in his still lifes

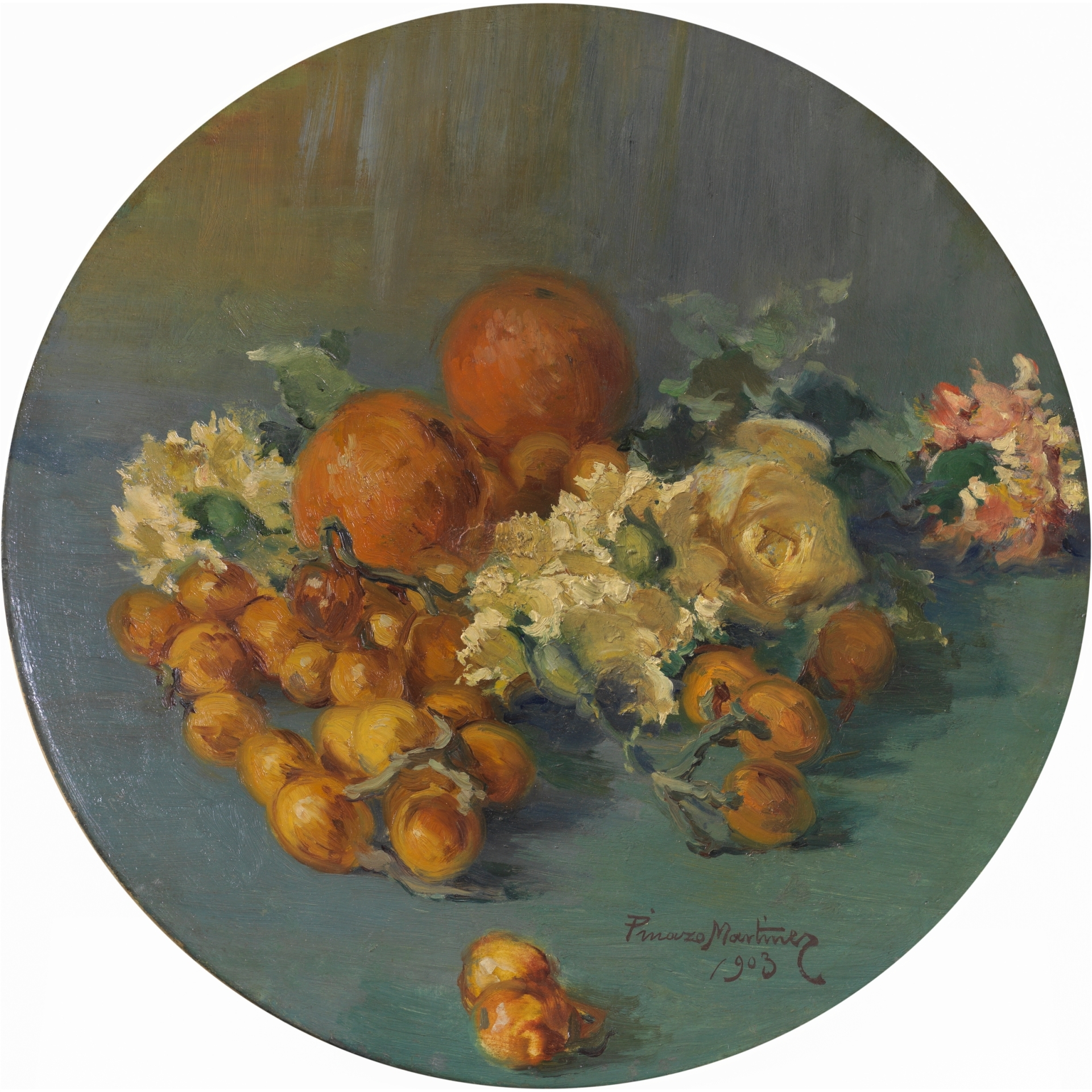
Still Life with Fruits; 1903, 43 cm, Prado Museum.

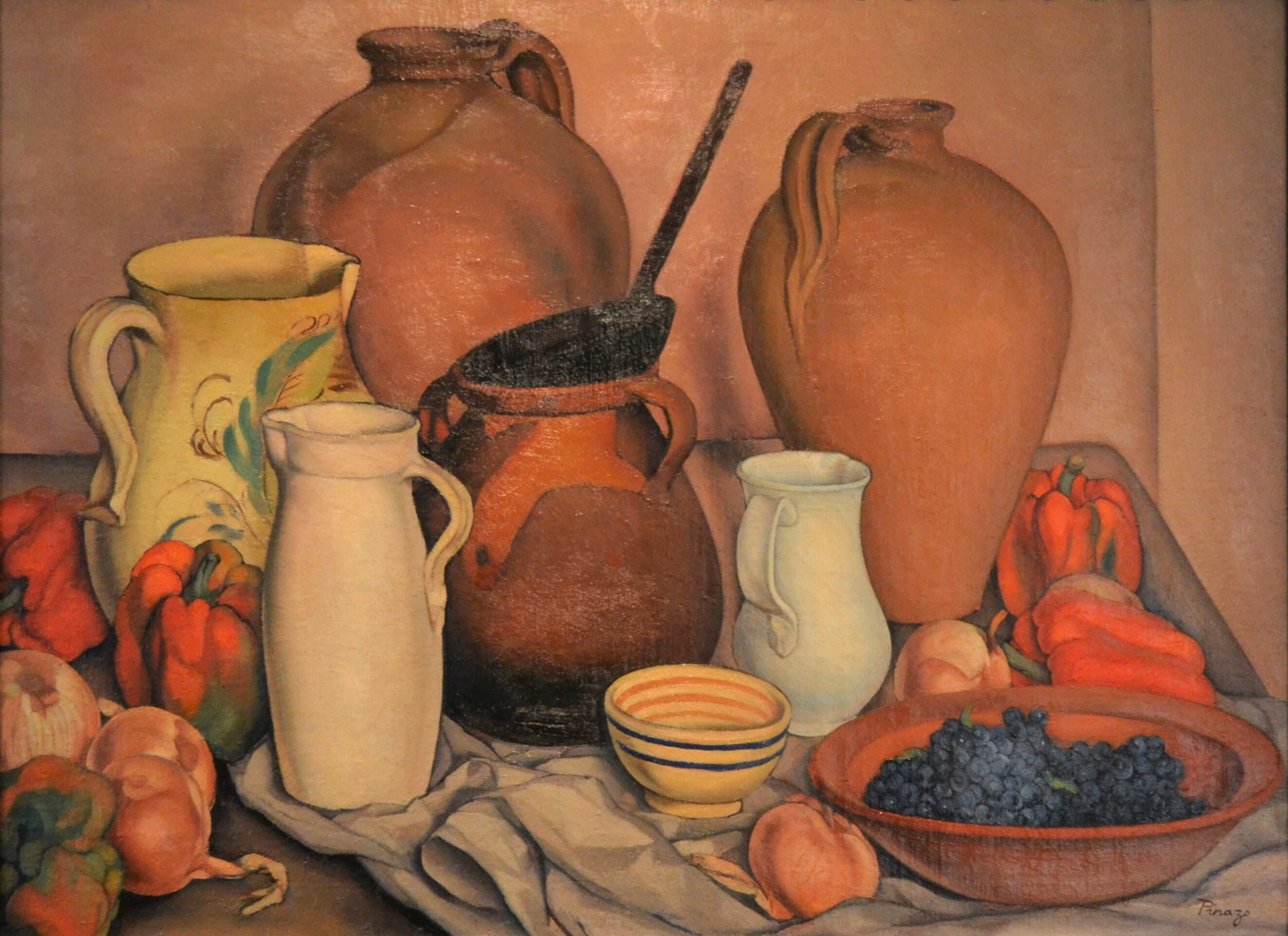
Still Life of Pitchers; c. after 1918, Museum of Fine Arts of Valencia.

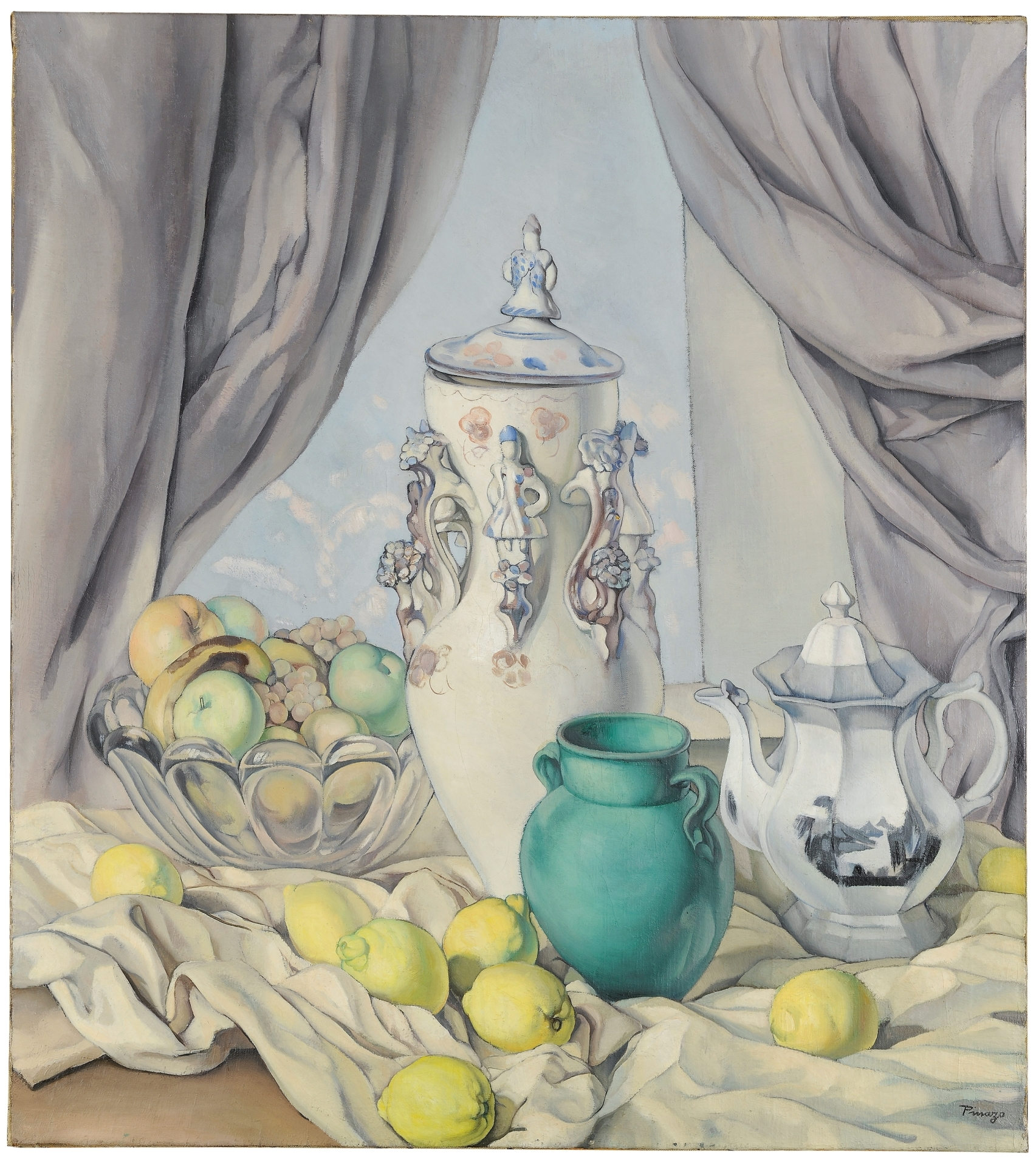
Still Life with Lemons, Pottery and Fruit Bowl; c. 1929, 113 x 100 cm, Prado Museum.
