= José Aguiar =

Spanish painter

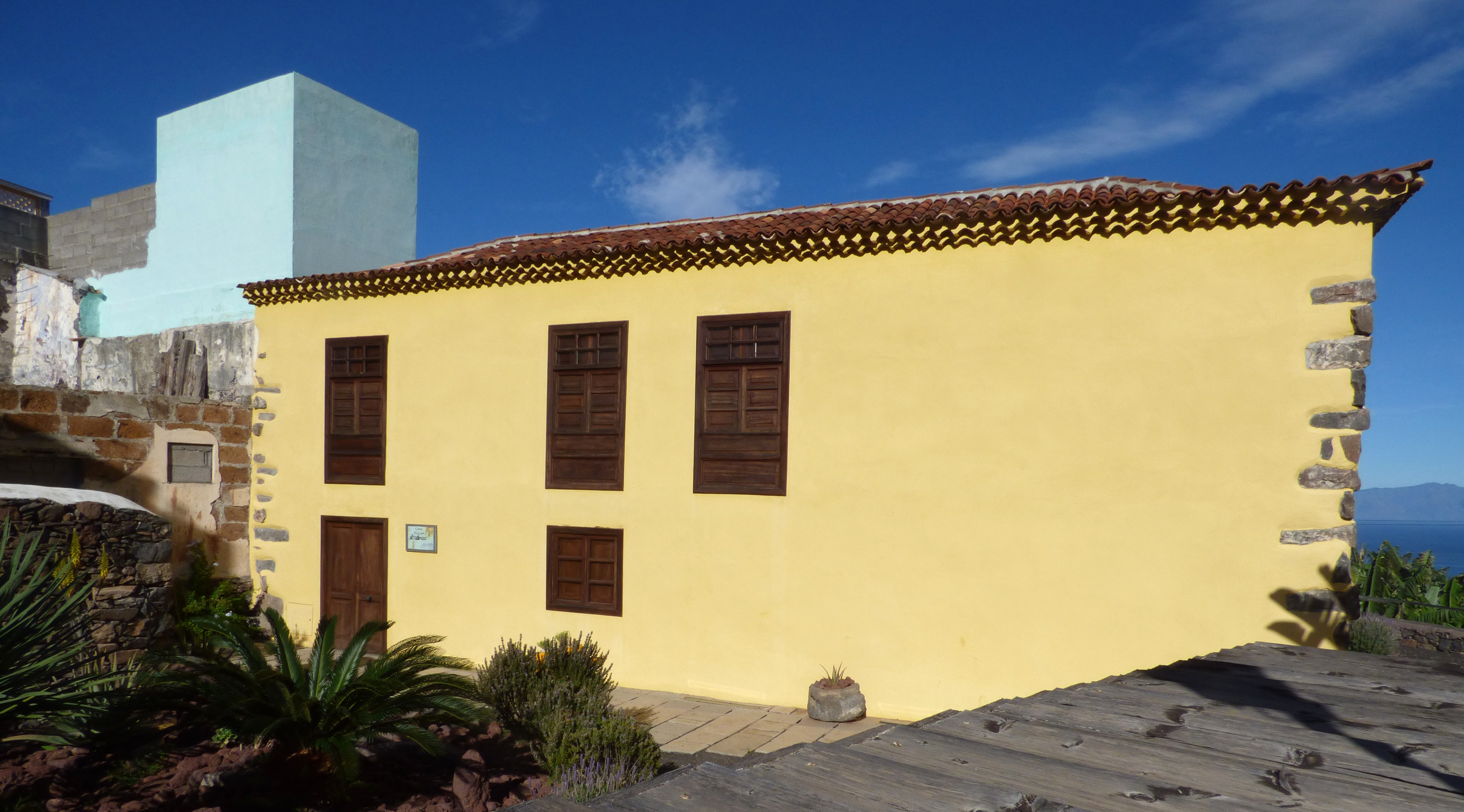
The house of José Aguiar, Calle de la Seda, Agulo in 2016.

José Aguiar or José Aguiar García (born 1895 (Santa Clara, Cuba), died 1976 (Madrid)) was a painter and muralist from La Gomera.

Aguiar was born in Cuba in 1895 but his family returned to Agulo, La Gomera a few months later in 1896 where he was baptised. He went to school in La Laguna and studied law in Madrid for two years before moving to the Escuela de Bellas Artes de San Fernando in 1916, studying under José Pinazo Martínez.

His main residence was Madrid from 1924 onwards although he moved for a period to Florence in 1930 and had a spell as Professor of Drawing at the School of Arts and Crafts in Seville from 1933. In 1947 he set up his studio in Pozuelo de Alarcón.

As well as producing numerous paintings, he also painted murals in several religious buildings in the Canary Islands and the Spanish mainland. He was a member of the Royal Academy of Fine Arts.

His house on Calle de la Seda, Agulo, a good example of eighteenth century Canarian architecture, was purchased by the municipal council and restored at a cost of 470,000 Euro as a part of the regeneration project of the municipality of Agulo. It was turned into a museum, library, artist studio and exhibition space.

== Selected works ==
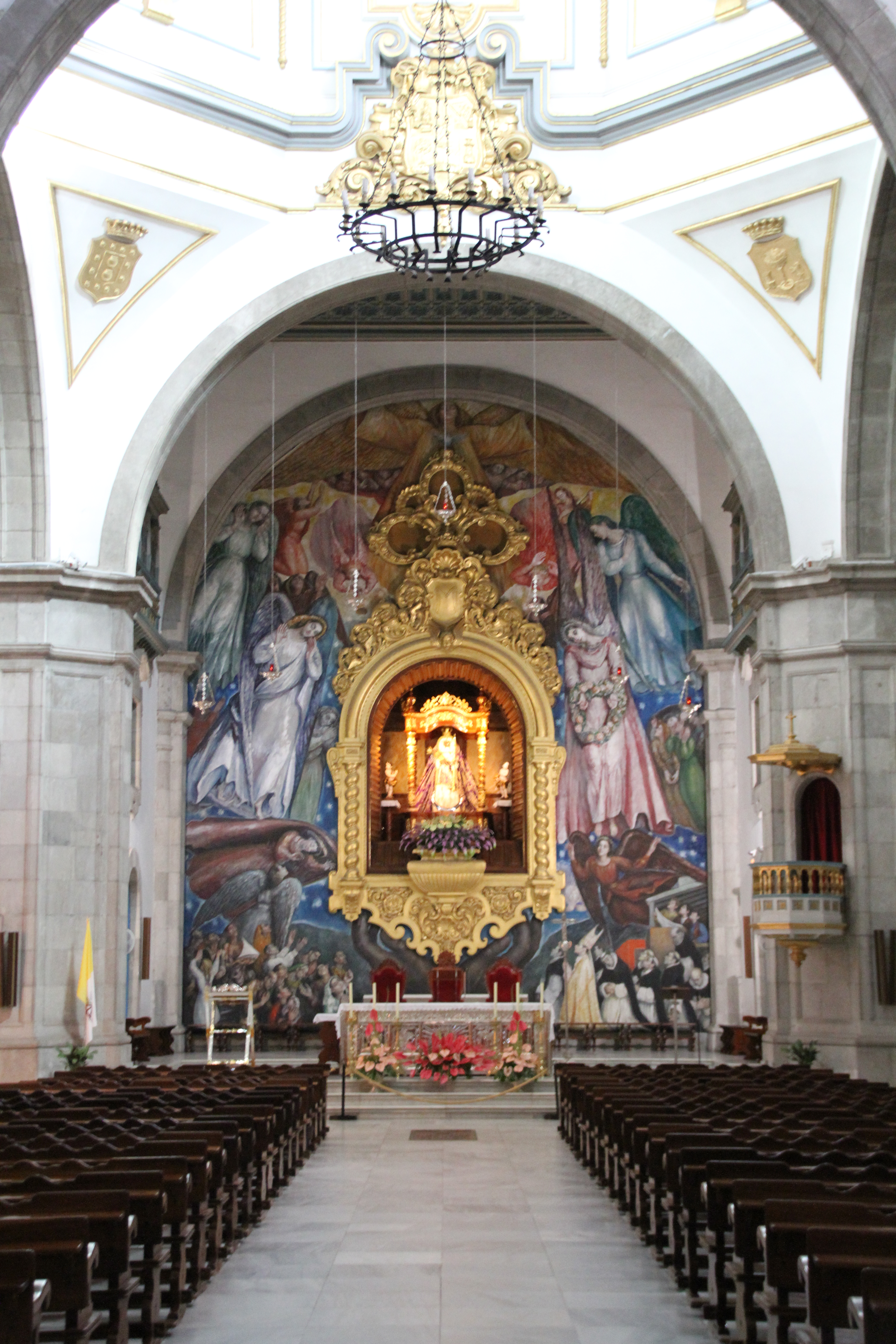
Murals by Aguiar in the Basilica of Candelaria

- Mujeres del sur (Women of the south) - Gold Medal, National Painting Exhibition, Barcelona, 1929
- Romaria de San Juan, Cabildo of La Gomera, 1924
- Frescoes in the Basilica of Candelaria, Tenerife such as El milagro de los panes y los peces (Miracle of the Loaves and the Fishes), 1962
- Friso Isleño (Islander Frieze), Casino de Santa Cruz de Tenerife, 1934
- Desnudo en rojo, c. 1940
- Composición campo y figuras, c. 1940
- Muja Canaria (Canarian woman), 1950s
- Maternidad O Desnudo (Maternity or Naked), 1946
- La pescadora, Collection of the City of London Corporation
- Lago, c. 1950
