= Torres de Santa Cruz =

Residential complex in Spain

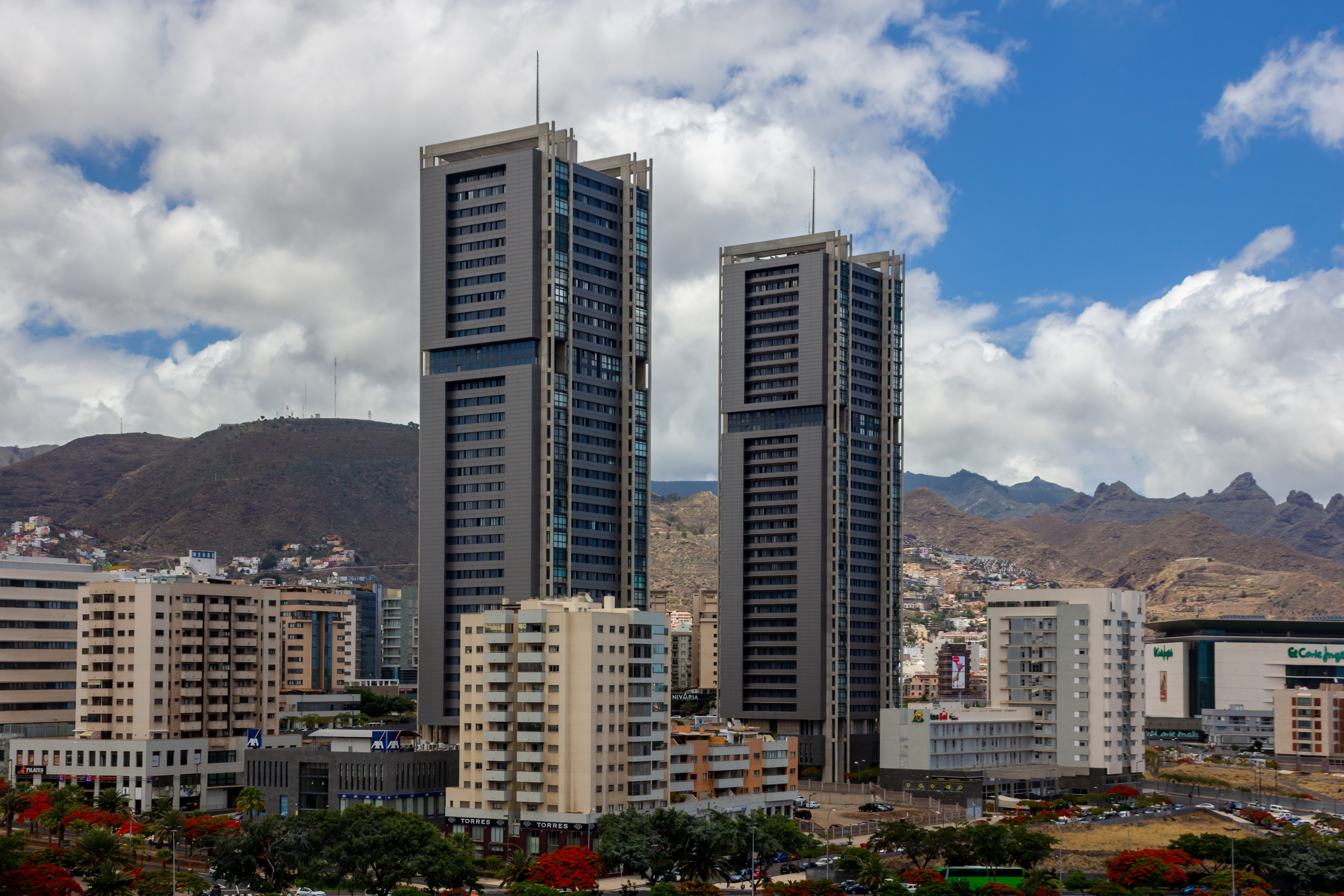
- Interactive map of the Torres de Santa Cruz area

General information
- Type: Mixed-use
- Location: Santa Cruz de Tenerife, Canary Islands, Spain
- Coordinates: 28°27′22″N 16°15′20″W
- Construction started: 2004
- Completed: 2006

Technical details
- Floor area: 41,753 m^{2} (449,430 sq ft)

Design and construction
- Architect: Julián Valladares
- Main contractor: Ferrovial (Tower I), Candesa (Tower II)

The Torres de Santa Cruz is a residential complex composed of the twin towers located in the city of Santa Cruz de Tenerife (Canary Islands, Spain). They were designed by Canarian architect Julian Valladares, and were built in the time period between 2004 and 2006.

The towers are 120 metres (390 feet) tall, without the antenna, becoming the tallest skyscraper in the Canary Islands, and the tallest residential building in Spain until 2010 (currently occupies third place in the latter category). The Torres de Santa Cruz are also the tallest twin towers in Spain. The towers are considered, together with the nearby Auditorio de Tenerife, one of the best symbols of the economic development of the Canary Islands.

== The buildings ==
The complex consists of twin towers of 41,753 square metres (449,430 square feet)—of which 9,613 m^{2} (103,470 sq ft) are below ground, and 32,140 m^{2} (346,000 sq ft) above ground. One peculiarity is that these buildings were not built at once. Although they are twin towers, Tower I was built by the company Ferrovial, while Tower II was built by the company Candesa.

The Tower I was completed in 2004 and Tower II in 2006, although the refurbishment work on the site began in 2001. After the September 11 attacks, the construction project of the Torres de Santa Cruz was paralyzed for a few years.

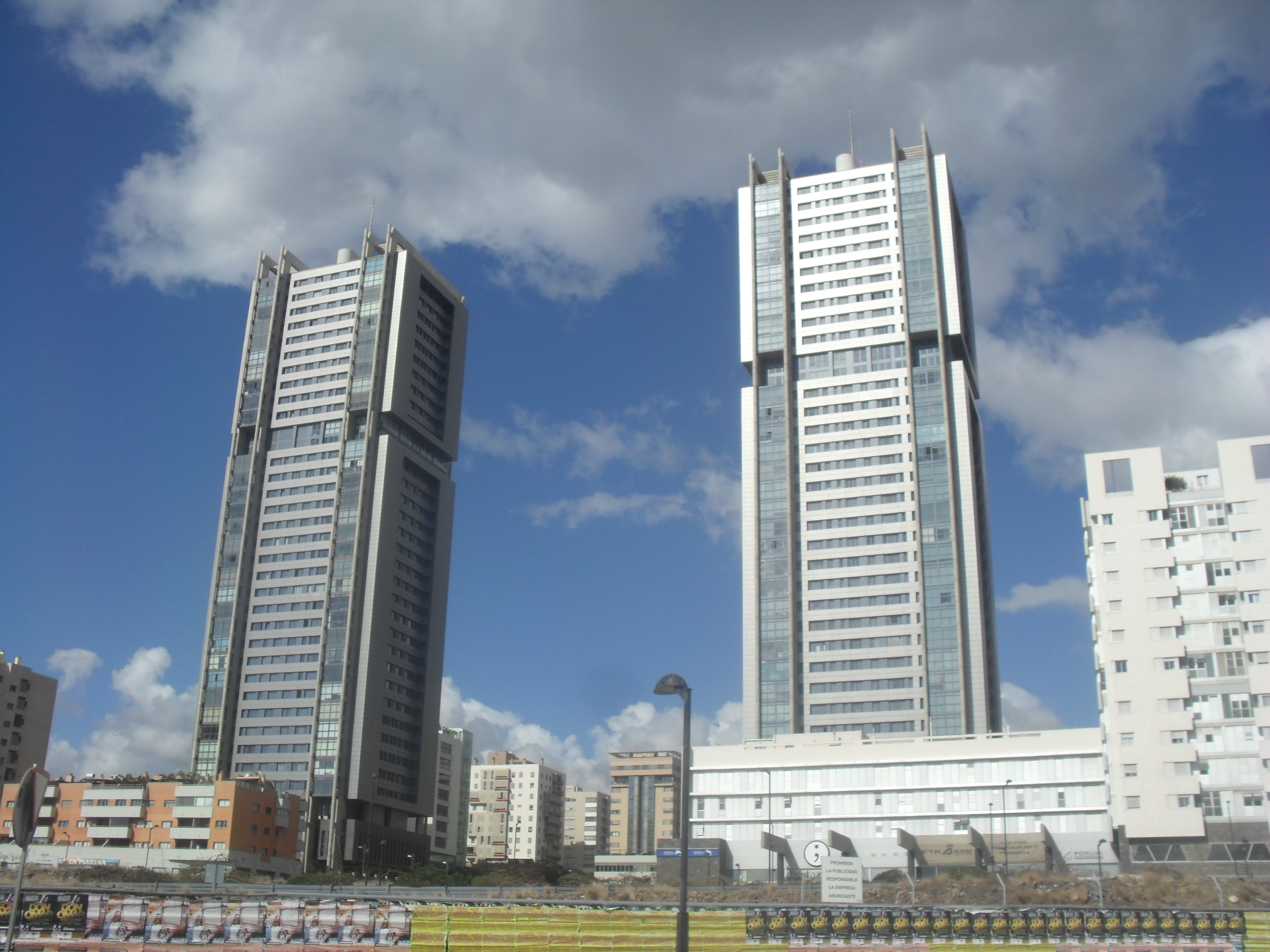
The towers seen from below

The original steel plates that were to be used for the cladding of the buildings had to be replaced by more resistant ones because during the Tropical Storm Delta in November 2005, the plates of Tower I (Tower II was still in construction) fell to the street due to strong gusts of wind (they reached up to 140 km/h on the coast). This motivated that Tower II was, during its construction, directly covered by a system of plates of stainless steel with an anchorage more reinforced than before and with a fixation much more resistant. Subsequently, a similar cover was installed on the facade of Tower I, which had suffered the force of the hurricane.

The Twin Towers of Santa Cruz are considered a symbol of the city, along with the adjacent Auditorio de Tenerife.

== Records ==
- They are the tallest skyscrapers in the city of Santa Cruz de Tenerife and the Canary Islands.
- Between 2004 and 2010 were the tallest residential building in Spain, currently ranked third in this category.
- At the time of its construction, the complex was the eighth-tallest building in Spain, currently the fifteenth-tallest.
- They are the tallest twin towers in Spain (6 metres higher than the Torres Kio in Madrid).
- They are the first buildings in the Canary Islands to boast a pair of large antennae.
- They are the tallest buildings in Spain outside of the Iberian Peninsula.
- They were the first buildings in the Canary Islands which entered the list of the tallest skyscrapers in Spain.

== In popular culture ==
- In the film Rambo: Last Blood of 2019, shot in part in Santa Cruz de Tenerife, there are several panoramic sequences of the city where the Towers of Santa Cruz and the Auditorio de Tenerife are distinguished.
- In 2022, some scenes from the American series Jack Ryan were filmed in the Torres de Santa Cruz.

== See also ==
- List of tallest buildings in Canary Islands
- List of twin buildings and structures
