= Old Road of Candelaria =

Pilgrimage route in Spain

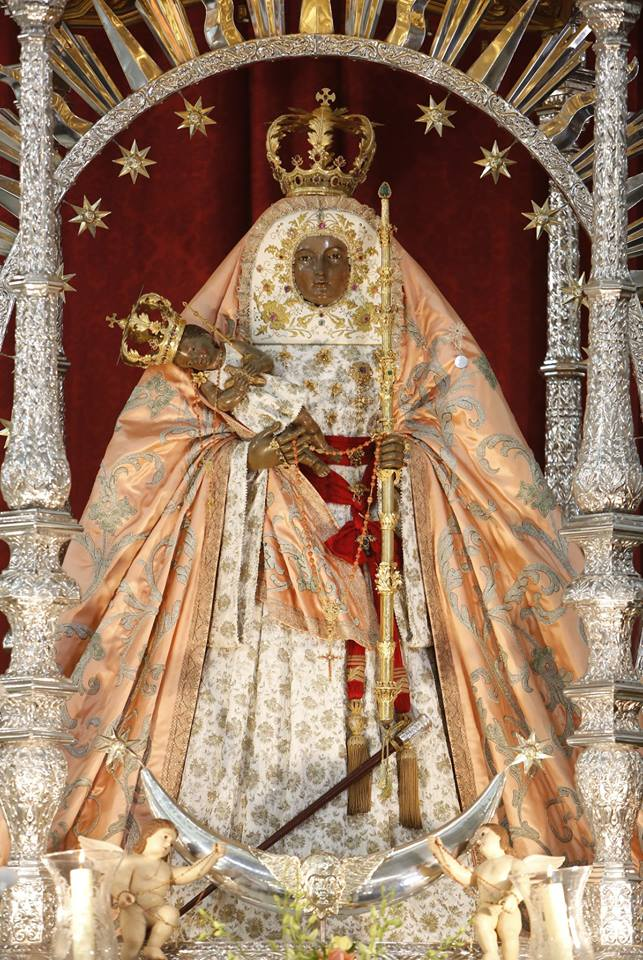
Virgin of Candelaria (patroness of the Canary Islands).

The Old Road of Candelaria (also Camino Viejo de Candelaria, Camino de Candelaria, Camino Real de Candelaria and Camino de Nuestra Señora de Candelaria) is an old pilgrimage route, declared in part of its route an Bien de Interés Cultural, with the category of Historical Site, since 2008. It runs through the municipalities of Candelaria, El Rosario, San Cristóbal de La Laguna and slightly Santa Cruz de Tenerife on the island of Tenerife (Canary Islands, Spain). It is linked to the cult of the Virgin of Candelaria (patroness of the Canary Islands).

== Characteristics ==
21 kilometer long path, which corresponds to the path that connected the old capital of Tenerife, San Cristóbal de La Laguna, with the coastal center of Candelaria. It leaves La Laguna along the Camino de San Francisco de Paula, through Los Baldíos and Llano del Moro, to head as the first major milestone on the route to the Church of Our Lady of El Rosario in Machado, continuing through the payments from Barranco Hondo and Igueste de Candelaria to the Marian villa.

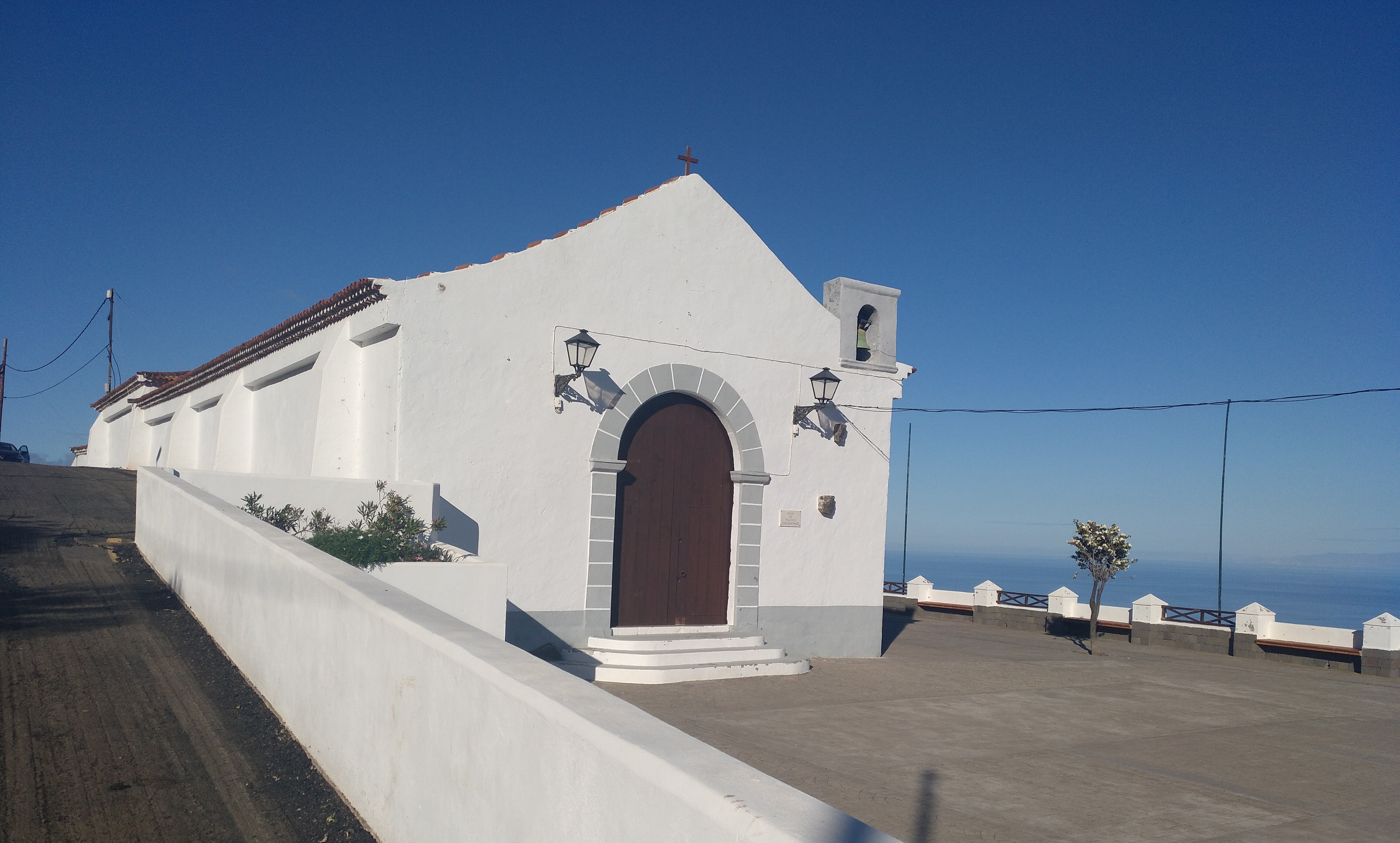
Hermitage of Our Lady of the Rosary in Machado, located on the side of the path.

From very early times it became an annual pilgrimage route, linked to religious devotion to the Virgin of Candelaria and her sanctuary. This path is already mentioned in the land distribution documents carried out by Adelantado Alonso Fernández de Lugo after the conquest. In the text by Alonso de Espinosa, referring to the miracles of the Virgin of Candelaria, he alludes to the opening of the road in the second decade of the 16th century, while indicating that around 1534 the hermitage of Nuestra Lady of the Rosary, as a resting place for pilgrims who went on pilgrimage. At the same time, it was the path used by the procession that carried the image of the Virgin of Candelaria in prayer, when it was taken to La Laguna due to the various calamities that affected the island.

It is therefore one of the oldest roads on the island and, possibly, one of the greatest heritage value, taking into account its antiquity, and the historical, religious and ideological circumstances that surround its future, without forgetting the ethnographic values derived of the construction of traditional paths, delimited by dry stone walls, with firm paving in the most difficult sectors and adaptation to the morphology of the terrain.

Currently, it continues to be used as one of the Pilgrimage routes to Candelaria. The institutionalized route of the Old road of Candelaria, organized by the town councils of El Rosario and Candelaria, takes place annually at the end of January (within the framework of the liturgical festival of the Virgin). It is also held during the August celebrations of the Virgin.

== See also ==
- Pilgrimage to Candelaria
- Hermano Pedro's Way
