= Pilgrimage to Candelaria =

Pilgrimage route in Spain

Pilgrimage to Candelaria Peregrinación a Candelaria / Caminata a Candelaria
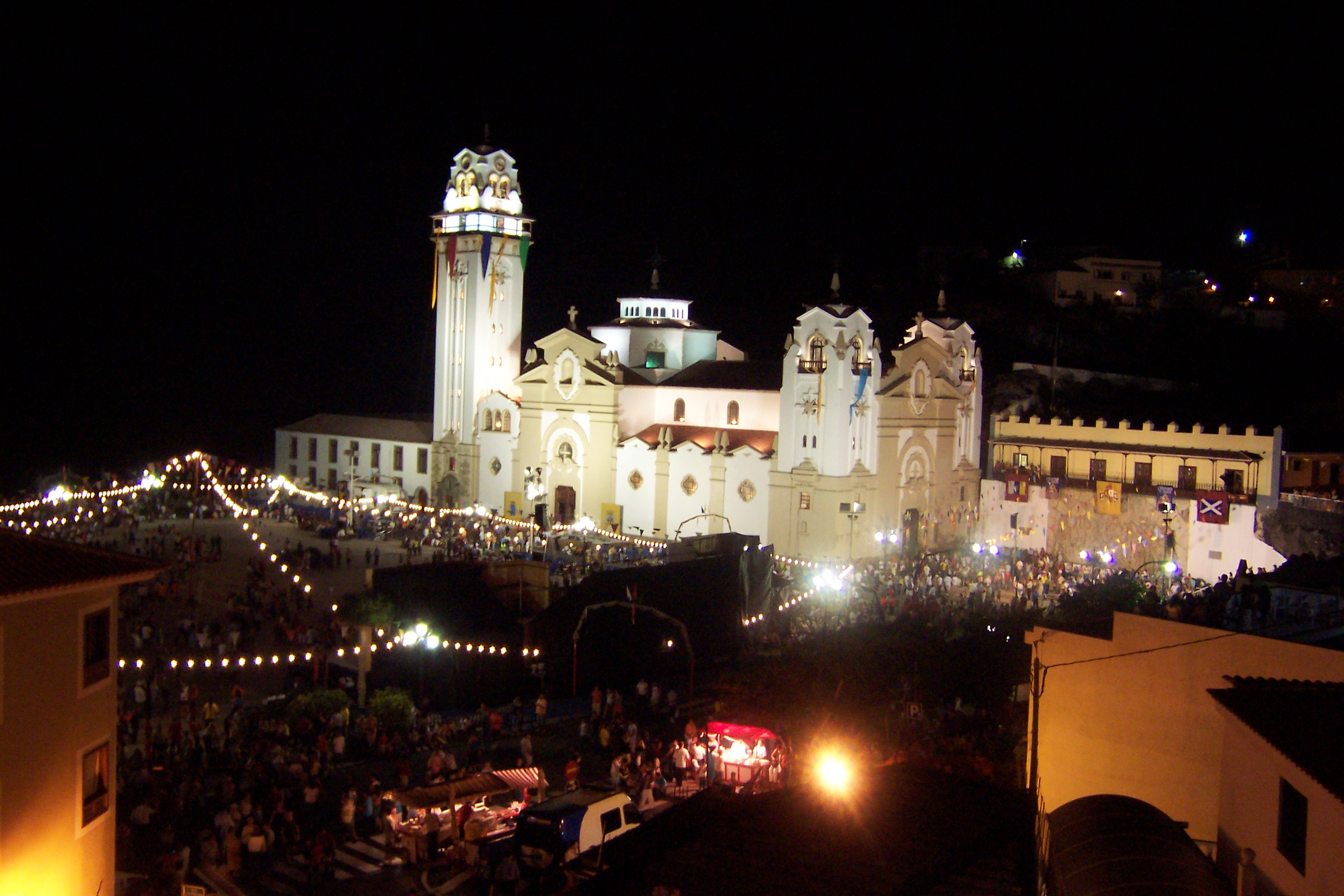
- Basilica of Our Lady of Candelaria, destination of pilgrimages. Photo of the basilica illuminated on the night of the pilgrimage.
- Status: Active
- Genre: Religious pilgrimage
- Begins: August 13 or 14 (depending on the place of departure of the pilgrims)
- Ends: August 15 (there are groups that also carry out the pilgrimage between February 1 and 2, although in a much smaller number than in August)
- Frequency: Annual
- Location: Candelaria, Tenerife
- Country: Spain
- Founder: Bencomo (historical); Alonso Fernández de Lugo (current form)
- Participants: Canary Islanders, although also people arriving from outside the archipelago.
- Attendance: More than 100,000 pilgrims
- Organiser: Candelaria city hall, Cabildo de Tenerife

The pilgrimage to Candelaria (popularly called the Candelaria Walk) is a religious march that takes place every year on the night of August 14 to 15 in Tenerife (Canary Islands, Spain) towards the municipality of Candelaria where the image is located. of the Patroness of the Canary Islands, the Virgin of Candelaria. It is one of the most popular events in the Canary Islands.

== History ==
The festivities of the Virgin of Candelaria that are celebrated on February 2 are a continuation of the one carried out by the conquerors in 1497 and the one on August 15 dates back to the 18th century and was financed with the alms of the town, where the appearance of the Virgin to the Guanches is remembered.

According to Fray Alonso de Espinosa (1594), the current so-called cave of San Blas was a place of pilgrimage for the Guanches of Tenerife to worship Chaxiraxi (the name that the Guanches gave to the Virgin). This pilgrimage was usually carried out during the August moon or Beñesmen. The Beñesmen in the Guanche calendar was an agricultural festival where the collection of the land's products was dedicated to Chaxiraxi. The Guanches offered gofio, goat meat, milk, cereals, etc. For all this, the Pilgrimage to Candelaria is a clear vestige of the Guanche Beñesmen, which is several centuries old and was even carried out by the Menceyes (aboriginal kings).

The Pilgrimage to Candelaria was the precedent of a tradition deeply rooted in all the Canary Islands, that of visiting the patron saint of each of the islands on foot.

== Characteristics ==
Pilgrims in general usually leave their localities or towns or from the capital, Santa Cruz de Tenerife or San Cristóbal de La Laguna. Many people from the north of the island also take part in this tradition, but they generally leave three days before, in order to arrive at the Candelaria on August 15, the main day of the festival. Commonly, they spend the night camping.

Generally, most of the route for pilgrims coming from the Metropolitan Area is the Carretera General del Sur (TF-28), which is located on the Autopista TF-1. Also parallel to the highway is the so-called "Camino del Peregrino" (Pilgrim's Path), a road that runs through the municipalities of Candelaria, El Rosario and Santa Cruz de Tenerife. This route also remains open throughout the year.

Recently, the organization of the pilgrimage route to Candelaria was carried out along the old Camino Real or "Old Road", which connected La Laguna with Candelaria, this route has the category of Bien de Interés Cultural (BIC) with category of Historical Site. The municipalities of El Sauzal, Tacoronte, Tegueste, La Laguna, El Rosario, La Victoria de Acentejo and La Matanza de Acentejo joined this initiative in 2008.

Pilgrims arriving from other islands or the Iberian Peninsula usually arrive by boat or plane to the island, and generally leave from Santa Cruz de Tenerife, the capital. For the festivities of February 2 of the Virgin, small groups also make the pilgrimage on foot, although due to weather reasons due to the winter dates, it is not as popular as in August.

== See also ==
- Old road of Candelaria
- Hermano Pedro's Way
