= Guañameñe =

Fifteenth-century fortune teller in the Canary Islands

Guañameñe or Guadameñe was the name of a Guanche fortune-teller who had prophesied the arrival of the Castilian conquerors to the island of Tenerife (Canary Islands, Spain) at the end of the fifteenth century. Subsequently, the word Guañameñe was extended to denominate the highest priestly rank of the Guanche society.

== History ==
The story about the fortune-teller Guañameñe is mainly due to the friar Alonso de Espinosa, who in his work Historia de Nuestra Señora de Candelaria mentions that the Guanches had been warned by the fortuneteller that some white people were to come inside large birds by the sea. According to the Dominican, Guañameñe would have prophesied these facts a century before the arrival of the Castilians in 1494, and was the reason that the mencey of Taoro ordered the rest of Guanche kings to notify him if any foreigner arrived on the shores of the Island, something that the one of Güímar did when appearing on its beaches the image of the Virgin of Candelaria.

For his part, Antonio de Viana turns the fortune-teller Guañameñe into a character in his epic Conquista de Tenerife published in 1604. In this work narrates that the fortune-teller asks the mencey Bencomo of Taoro, who is in the audience, and predicts that foreigners would arrive from the sea and that they would rule the island. This upsets the mencey, who responds by ordering Guañameñe to be hanged from a tree.

== Priesthood ==
Guañameñe also refers to the highest rank of priest or shaman Guanche (high priest) who advised the aboriginal monarchs, called menceyes, on the island of Tenerife before the Castilian conquest.

The Guañameñes enjoyed a high social consideration and had a great knowledge of oral tradition and interpreted natural and celestial phenomena. Possibly they had a great influence in the political control. They presided over the assemblies or Tagoror.

According to Bethencourt Alfonso, the Guañameñes wore black and wore an amulet or idol called Guatimac.

== Nowadays ==
Currently the term Guañameñe is used as a reference to the highest priestly caste of the Neopagan organization called Church of the Guanche People.
