= Aáron Alonso =

Spanish footballer (born 2005)

Personal information
- Full name: Aáron Alonso Rodríguez
- Date of birth: 10 June 2005 (age 21)
- Place of birth: El Rosario, Tenerife, Spain
- Height: 1.85 m (6 ft 1 in)
- Position: Goalkeeper

Team information
- Current team: Barcelona B
- Number: 51

Youth career
- 2010–2011: San José Tablero CF
- 2011–2013: CD Sobradillo
- 2013–2014: UD Andenes
- 2014–2016: Sporting Tenerife
- 2016–2017: CD Laguna
- 2017–2018: CD Marino
- 2018–: Barcelona
- 2022–2023: → Sabadell (loan)

Senior career*
Years	Team	Apps	(Gls)
2022–2023	→ Sabadell B (loan)	3	(0)

International career^{‡}
2020	Spain U15	1	(0)
2021	Spain U17	1	(0)
- * Club domestic league appearances and goals as of 30 August 2023 ‡ National team caps and goals as of 30 August 2023

Aáron Alonso Rodríguez (born 10 June 2005) is a Spanish footballer who plays as a goalkeeper for La Liga club Barcelona.

== Early life ==
Alonso was born on 10 June 2005 in El Rosario, Tenerife, the second eldest of three children. His father worked as a businessman and was a former goalkeeper in the lower levels for Real Madrid whilst his mother worked as a technical architect.

== Club career ==
Alonso began his career playing in the youth sectors of Gran Canaria during which he won the Rodagon Cup and Maspalomas Cup. He signed for Barcelona on 16 May 2018, playing in the older youth groups for the club in La Liga Cadete Preferente. Alonso initially played for the Infantil A in the 2018–19 season before getting promoted towards the Cadete B and Cadete A sides the following two seasons.

== International career ==
A youth Spanish international, Alonso has represented the Spanish U15, U16 and U17 squads. He made his debut for the U15 side on 30 January 2020 in a 2–0 victory over Ireland U15. Alonso earned his first call-up for the U17 side in September 2021, making his debut on 13 October 2021 in a 2–1 win against Netherlands.
