= Barranco Grande Windmill =

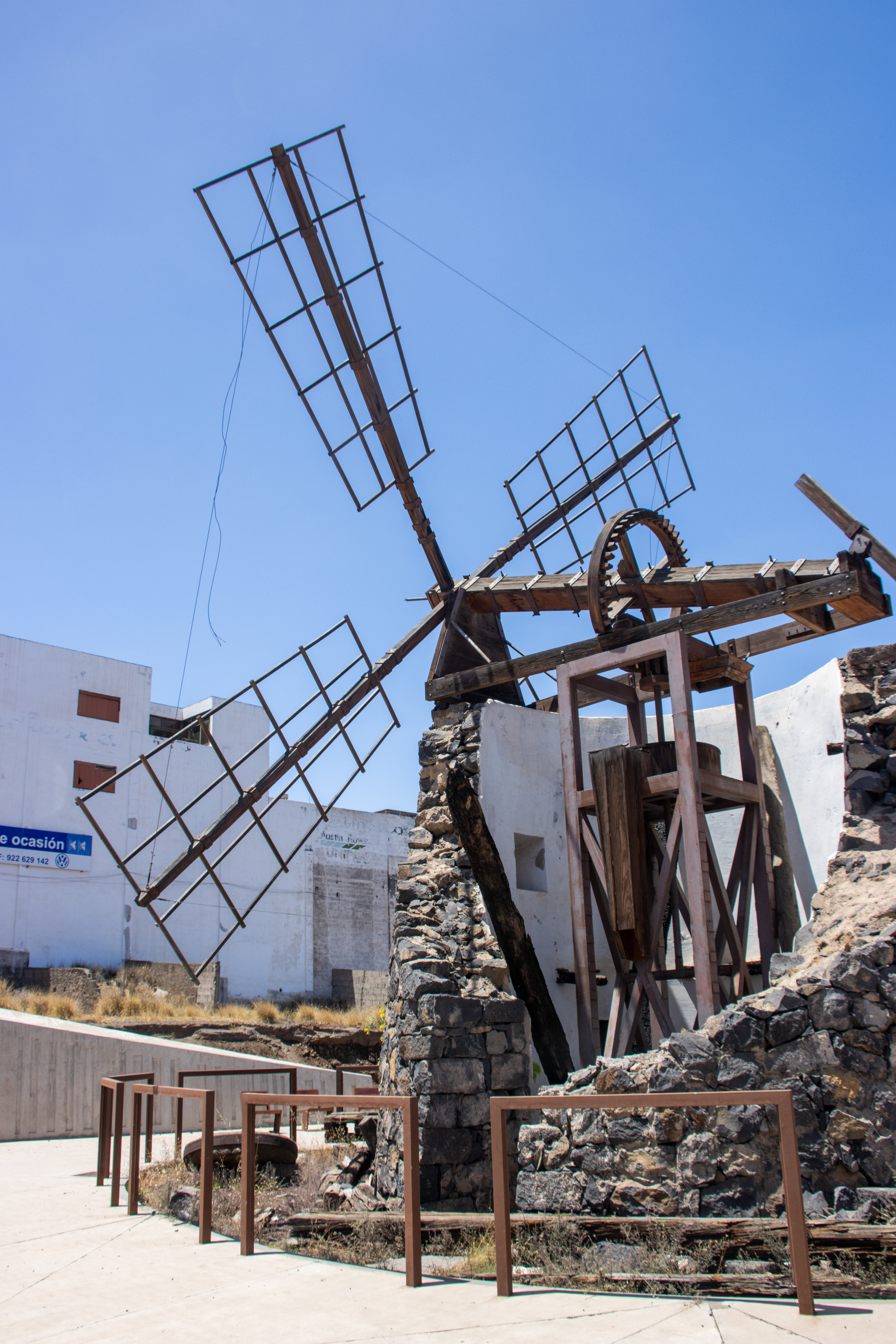

- Location within Tenerife
- 28°26′17″N 16°18′21″W
- Type: windmill
- Location: Barranco Grande, Tenerife

History
- Demolished: 1973
- Rebuilt: 2010

Spanish Cultural Heritage
- Designated: 2007

The Barranco Grande Windmill or Grand Canyon Mill (Spanish: Molino de Barranco Grande) is located in Barranco Grande, Santa Cruz de Tenerife, on the island of Tenerife, Spain. It is similar to the Cuevas Blancas Windmill, and is one of three remaining windmills in the region, the other being in El Rosario, Tenerife.

The mill was conical, with masonry walls, and is around 9 metres (30 ft) high. It was mostly demolished by a mechanical shovel on 27 January 1973. It was listed as Bien de Interés Cultural on 18 December 2007.

The remains were acquired by the Santa Cruz town hall in 2007, who subsequently contracted its restoration to Volconsa at a cost of €425,000. The mill was not completely reconstructed, but the blades and gears were recreated in 2010, and former parts of the windmill are now arranged around the remains.
