= Hermano Pedro's Way =

Pilgrimage route in Spain

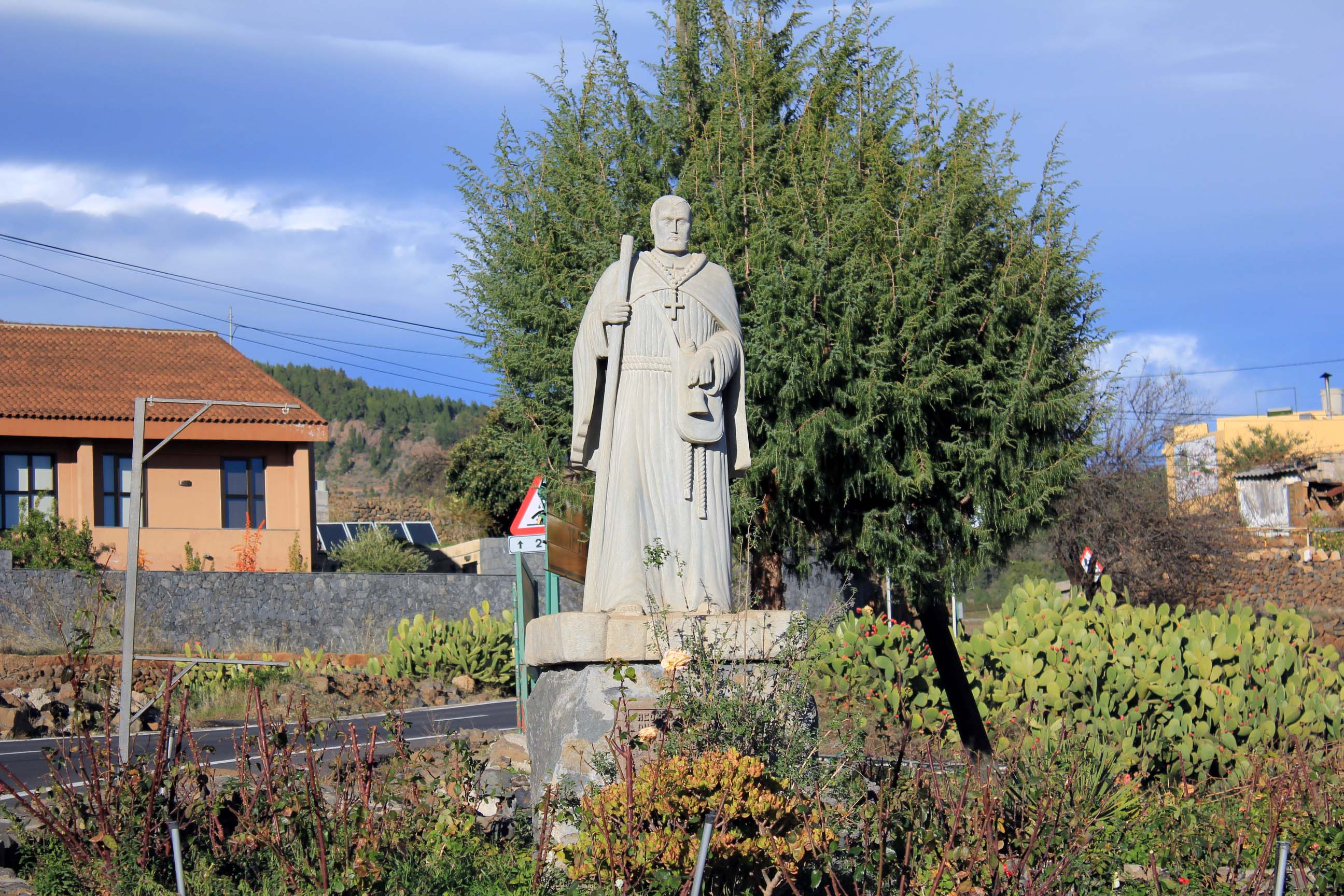
Statue of Saint Peter of Betancur at the entrance to the town of Vilaflor.

The Hermano Pedro's Way (also known as the Ruta del Hermano Pedro or the Ruta del Camino del Hermano Pedro) is an ancient pilgrimage route, linked to the figure of Saint Peter of Saint Joseph de Betancur (better known as Santo Hermano Pedro), who is the first Saint of the Canary Islands. It runs approximately 19 kilometers between the municipalities of Vilaflor, San Miguel de Abona and Granadilla de Abona, in the southeast of the island of Tenerife (Spain).

== History ==
The Hermano Pedro's Way is, in its origin, a transhumance route used by the Guanche aborigines to direct their livestock from coast to summit, depending on the season of the year. After the conquest of the island in the 15th century, it continued to be framed by a set of traditional paths, appearing on historical maps of the 18th and 19th centuries. This route was also used in the 17th century by Saint Peter of Betancur during his childhood and adolescence, when he worked as a goat shepherd, before carrying out his missionary and apostolic work in Guatemala.

== The route ==
In 2005, following the canonization of the saint three years earlier, a study began with the purpose of recovering, revaluing and institutionalizing the path of Hermano Pedro and its adjacent paths. In addition to highlighting it as a symbol of union of the municipalities of the Abona or Chasna region (Fasnia, Arico, Granadilla de Abona, San Miguel de Abona and Vilaflor).

The official pilgrimage takes place annually on the Saturday before to April 24 (the saint's holiday).

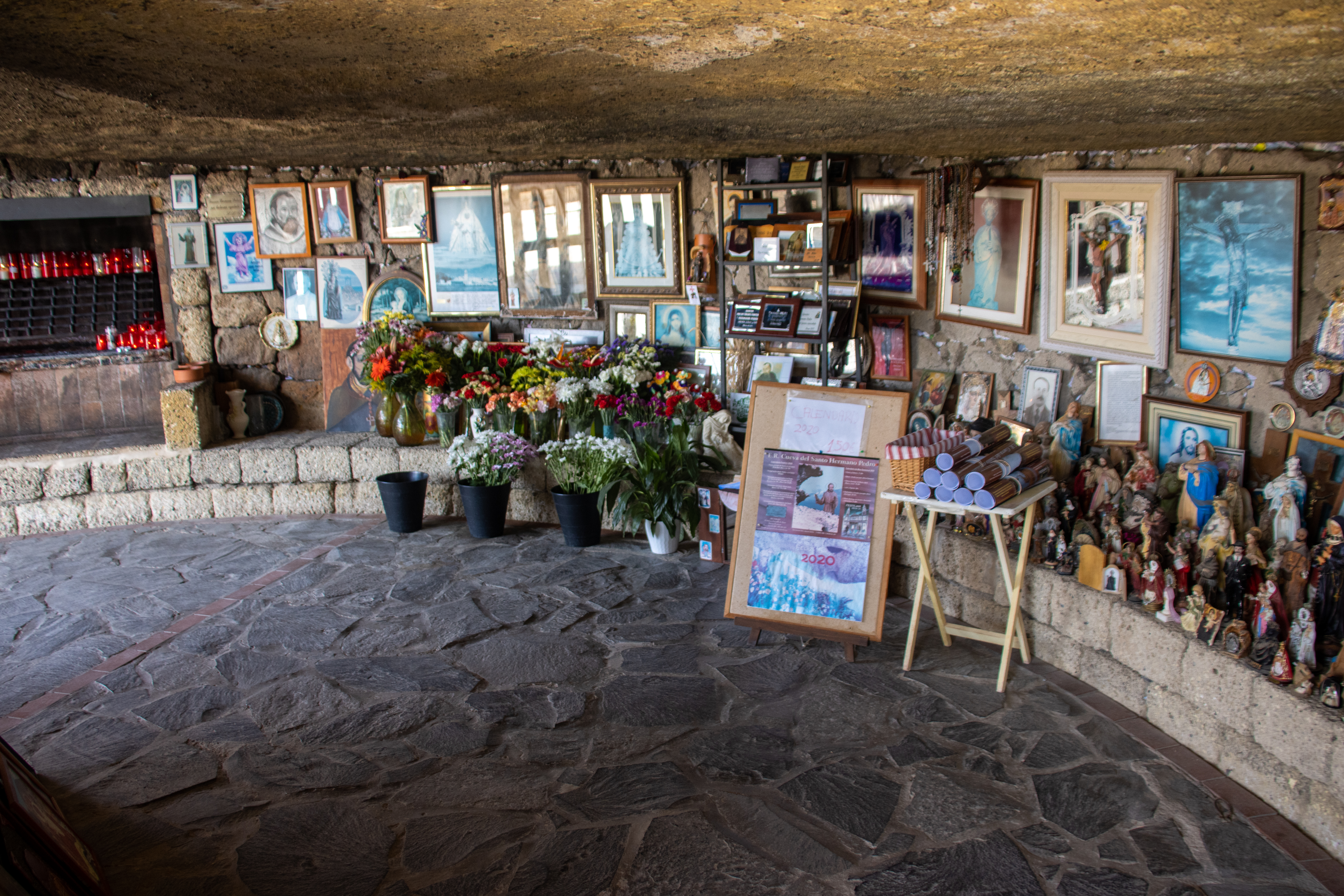
Interior of the cave of Santo Hermano Pedro.

First, a Eucharist takes place at 6:00 in the morning in the main parish of Saint Peter the Apostle in the town of Vilaflor, the saint's hometown. At 7:00 the downhill or descent route begins, crossing part of the municipality of San Miguel de Abona until reaching the popularly known as cave of Santo Hermano Pedro in the municipality of Granadilla de Abona. This place was used by Hermano Pedro as a shelter or refuge with his flock in winter, as a place of prayer and even as a hiding place to protect himself from pirate raids.

The trail route lasts approximately five hours. The route is dotted with important samples of natural and cultural heritage; fauna of great interest that can be observed along the route; and other elements. In addition to important architectural elements and Bien de Interés Cultural (BIC).

Arrival at the cave is estimated at 1:00 p.m., where another Eucharist and the veneration of a relic of the saint takes place.

In addition to the promoters and organizers of the route: the municipalities of Vilaflor and Granadilla, other entities and volunteers from the religious space of the cave of Santo Hermano Pedro collaborate. In 2012 this route was promoted in the Network of Religious Routes in Europe with the aim of joining it.

== See also ==
- Pilgrimage to Candelaria
- Old road of Candelaria
