= Cho (Arona) =

Village in the Canary Islands, Spain

Coordinates: 28.049°N 16.661°W

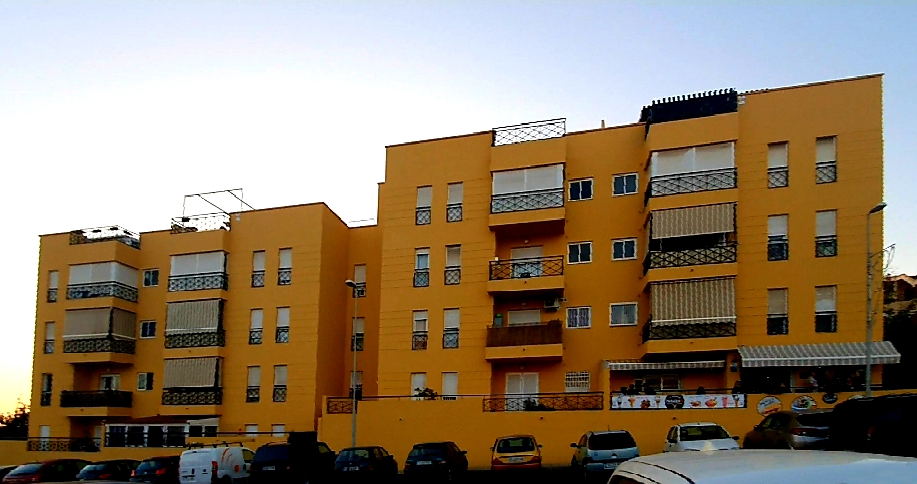
Cho

Cho, also known as Parque de la Reina, is a village in the municipality of Arona, on the island of Tenerife in the Canary Islands, Spain. It is situated south of the Autopista TF-1, 1 kilometer east of the town of Guaza.
