= Guatimac =

Guanche cult image

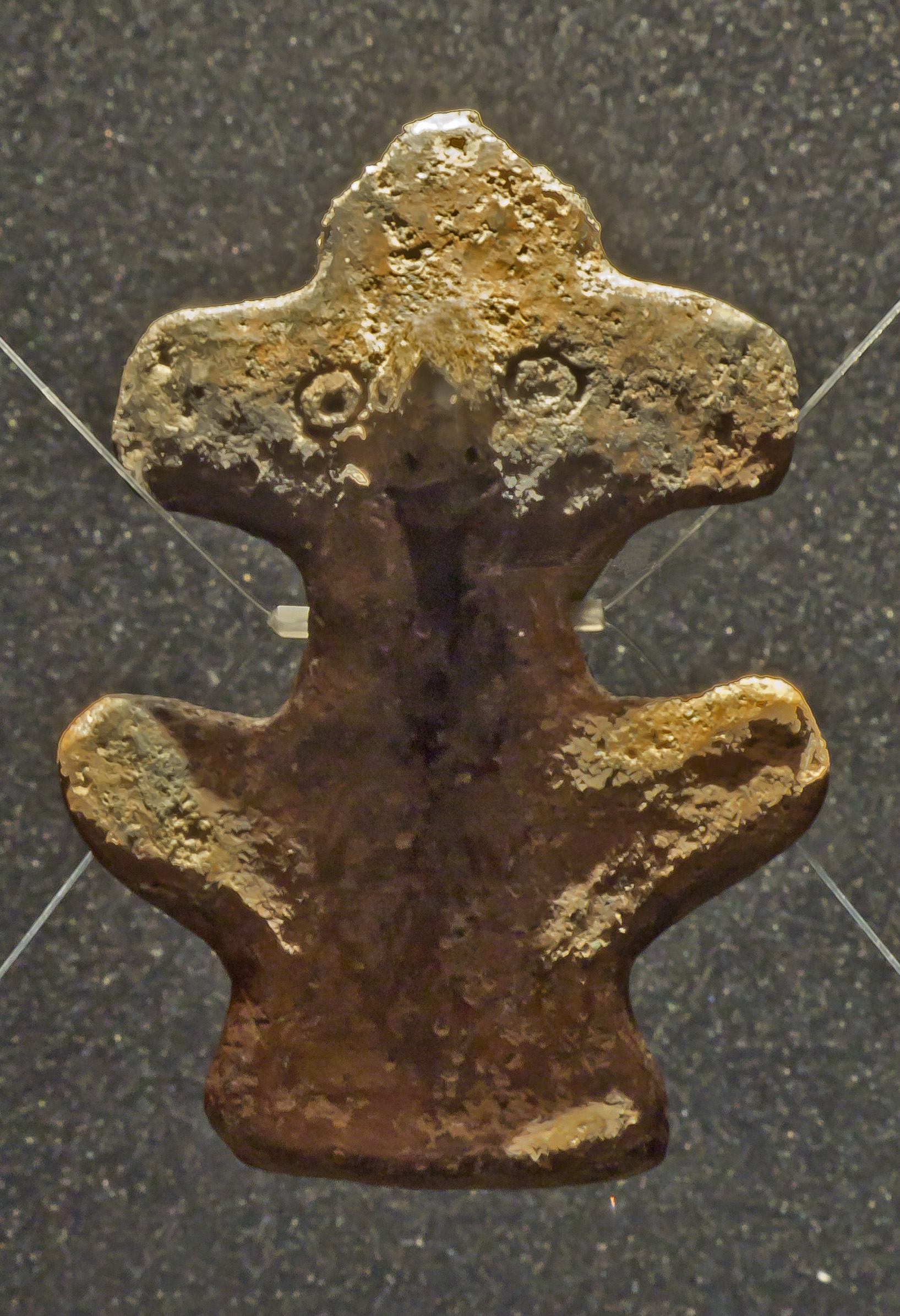
Guatimac in the Archaeological Museum of Puerto de la Cruz.

Guatimac or the Idol of Guatimac is an owl-shaped Guanche cult image, found in 1885, hidden in a cave between the municipalities of Fasnia and Güímar (Tenerife, Canary Islands, Spain) wrapped in goat hide.

== Characteristics ==
The idol, made from fired clay, is incomplete, with two appendages missing from its head. It bears a hole next to its neck, presumably to pass a strap through and wear it as an amulet. This type of cult image was used by the aboriginal priestly castes of the Kankus, who were responsible with the worship of ancestor spirits, and the Guañameñes, the high priests. Along with Guatimac, numerous Guanche mummies were found at the cave in the midst of the 19th century.

Despite its small size, only about 6.4 centimeters in height, it is a figure of great anthropological value, since it is one of the few idols of prehistorical Tenerife that survived to the modern day. Today, the figurine can be seen at the Archaeological Museum of Puerto de la Cruz.

== Interpretation ==
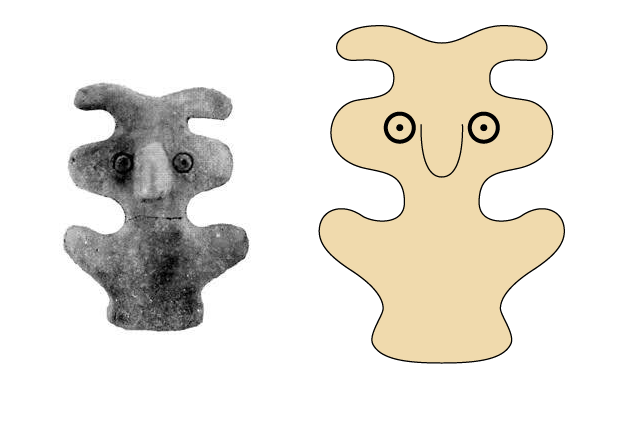
The original form of guatimac. It has been speculated to represent an owl. According to Juan Bethencourt Alfonso, the guañameñes (fortune tellers or clairvoyants) carried the idol around their necks, whose possible etymology (*watămak, "he who fixes his gaze") corresponds with that of the concept of clairvoyance and the figure of the owl.

Although its exact meaning cannot be known for certain, it seems to be related to the religious world of the Guanches. It is believed by some that it represents a type of jinn or protective spirit, but others hold that it is an animal or sacred totem, possibly an owl.

Guatimac can be considered an asexual idol, that is to say, it is a human figure without distinguishing sexual characteristics. Other historians maintain the position that it represents and animal, perhaps an owl, and therefore classify it as a zoomorphic figurine (bearing the shape of an animal).

Guatimac represents a rarity within the idols of the Canary Islands, since it has no parallels within the rest of the remains of the extinct Guanche culture. However, rock carvings representing a certain type of evil Jinns, the Yenum or Jenun, have been found in desert caves within the Berber cultural zone of North Africa. The Berber tribes believe the Yenum to inhabit the interior of the earth and caves. Their representations bear striking resemblance to the idol of Guatimac. Since the Guanches are identified as Berbers themselves, originating from North Africa, the idol could represent a general idea that exists throughout the Berber cultural sphere. However, the fact that no similar figures has been found in the Canary Islands, or even around the island of Tenerife itself remains an enigma.

Despite this, according to different sources, other figurines have indeed been found in Tenerife, but whose whereabouts are currently unknown.

== Description ==
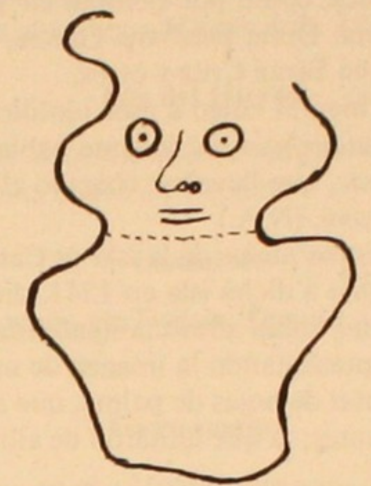
Reproduction of the Guanche "Guatimac" idol from Tenerife by Juan Bethencourt Alfonso in his work "Historia del Pueblo Guanche".

One of the first historians to deal with the subject of the Guanche idols was the tinerfeño Juan Bethencourt Alfonso. He offers us this description of the idol's discovery and subsequent study:

"One that we examined from the pharmacist Don Ramón Gómez of Puerto de la Cruz, was found in 1885 in a cave in the Erques ravine in Fasnia, wrapped in skins, like the rest we found, is a little smaller, although the same family, a guatimac, or as the commoners like to say, "del muñeco de barro", that the guañameñe and smaraine priests used to hang around their neck as a pectoral. The symbol or idol we are dealing with is made of fired clay, although the firing is uneven and the colour is yellowish-white. The figurine is incomplete since a small piece of what can be called a cranial vault or a helmet, as indicated by the interruption of the profile, and the dotted line indicates the site, towards the neck, where there's a hole to pass a strap in order to wear it. The figurine is flattened front to back and is 6 to 7 millimeter thick, except at the base, where it is a centimeter thick."

— Juan Bethencourt Alfonso
