= Deutsche Schule Santa Cruz de Tenerife =

Coordinates: 28.4122°N 16.3339°W

- Tabaita Alta, El Rosario, Tenerife; Spain

Information
- Type: German international school
- Established: 1909
- Grades: 1-12

Deutsche Schule Santa Cruz de Tenerife (DST Spanish: Colegio Alemán de Santa Cruz de Tenerife) is a German international school in the Tabaita Alta section of El Rosario, on the island of Tenerife in Spain, near Santa Cruz de Tenerife. It serves years 1–12, serving kindergarten through Oberstufe II.

== History ==
It originated from a private school established in 1909 by German and Swiss families. The classes were initially held at Puerto de la Cruz, and moved to the annex of the garden of Jakob Ahlers, the German consul, in 1919. The primary school annex opened in the garden of the Groth family in 1924. Another location opened in the German Club on calle Consolación. In 1927 the Groth and German club locations consolidated. The classes moved to Numancia, 33 in 1928. The German school association opened on 12 November 1932.
