= Archaeological Museum of Puerto de la Cruz =

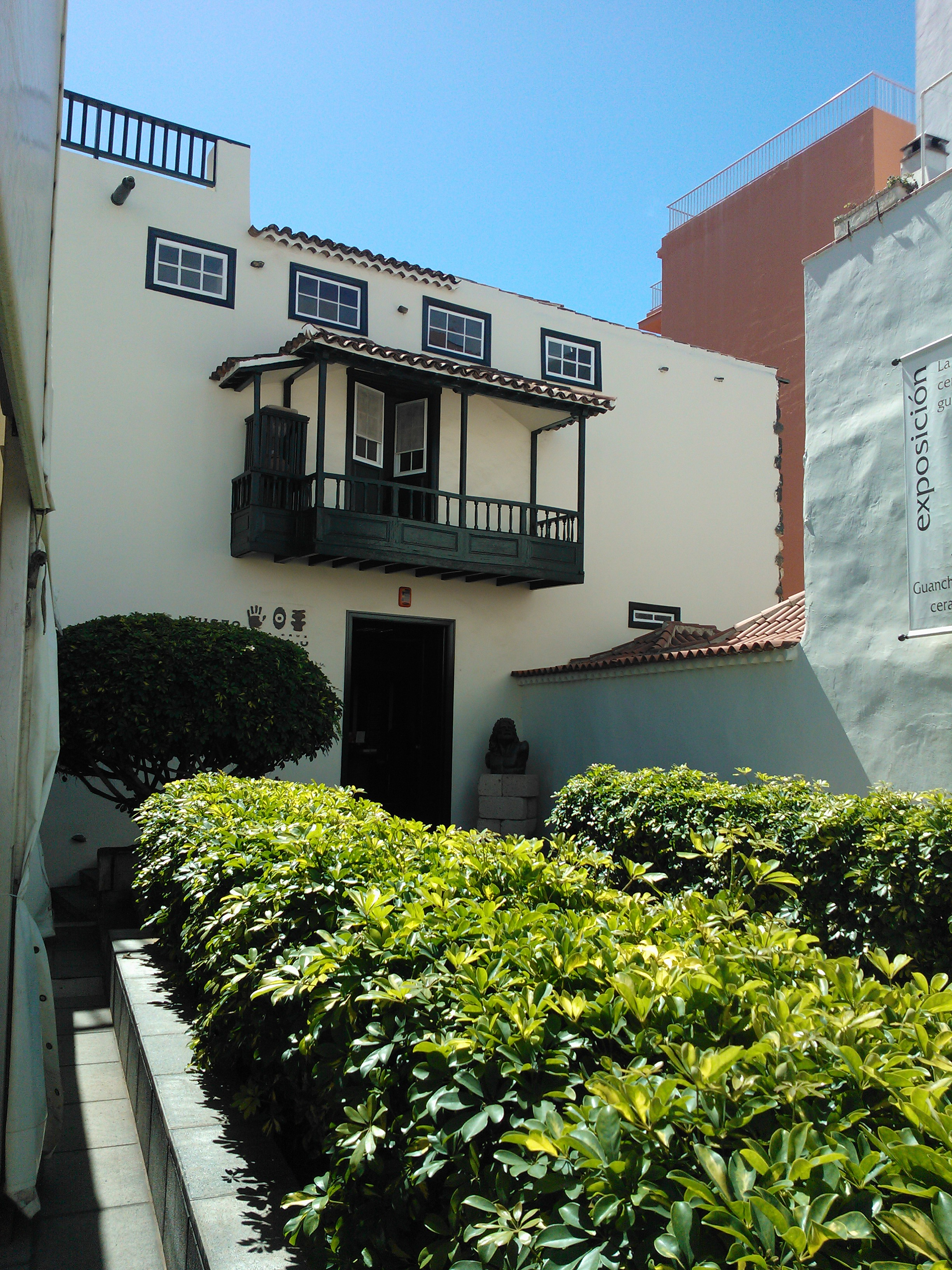
- Archaeological Museum of Puerto de la Cruz
- Location: Puerto de la Cruz, Tenerife, Canary Islands
- Coordinates: 28°25′01″N 16°33′09″W
- Type: archaeological museum

The Archaeological Museum of Puerto de la Cruz (Spanish: Museo Arqueológico del Puerto de la Cruz) is a small archaeological museum located in the town of Puerto de la Cruz (Tenerife, Canary Islands, Spain). One of the most important local museums, it offers an archival collection comprising more than 2,600 specimens of the aboriginal Guanche culture, and a document collection named after researcher Luis Diego Cuscoy.

The Puerto de la Cruz museum has an enormous collection of aboriginal Guanche ceramics, including the remains of several ancient Guanche mummies. It contains several unique pieces native to the island, such as two limpet shells, a finding of Telesforo Bravo, and an anthropomorphic figure or clay idol known as "Guatimac".

== Photos ==
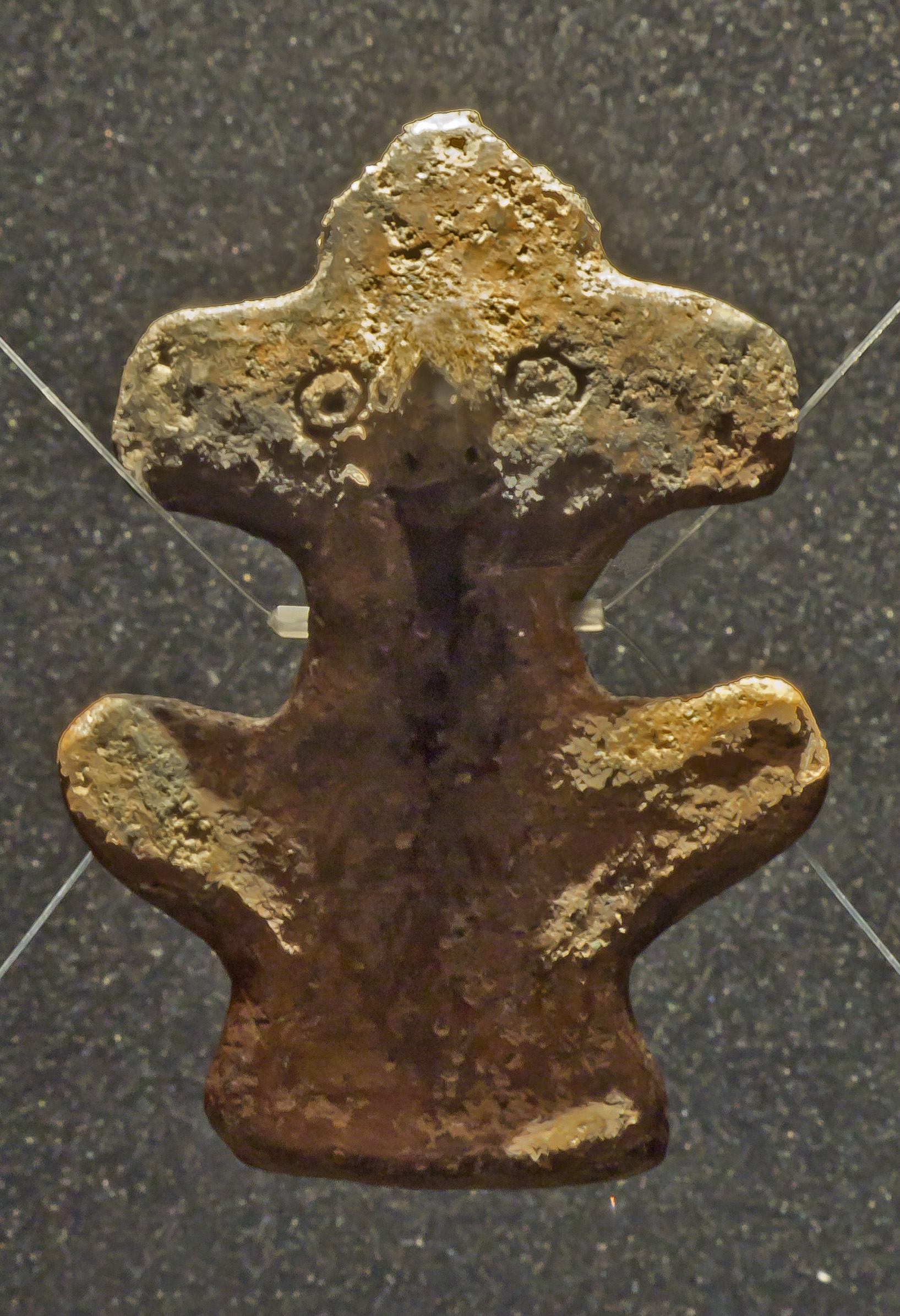
Guatimac, Guanche idol figurine.

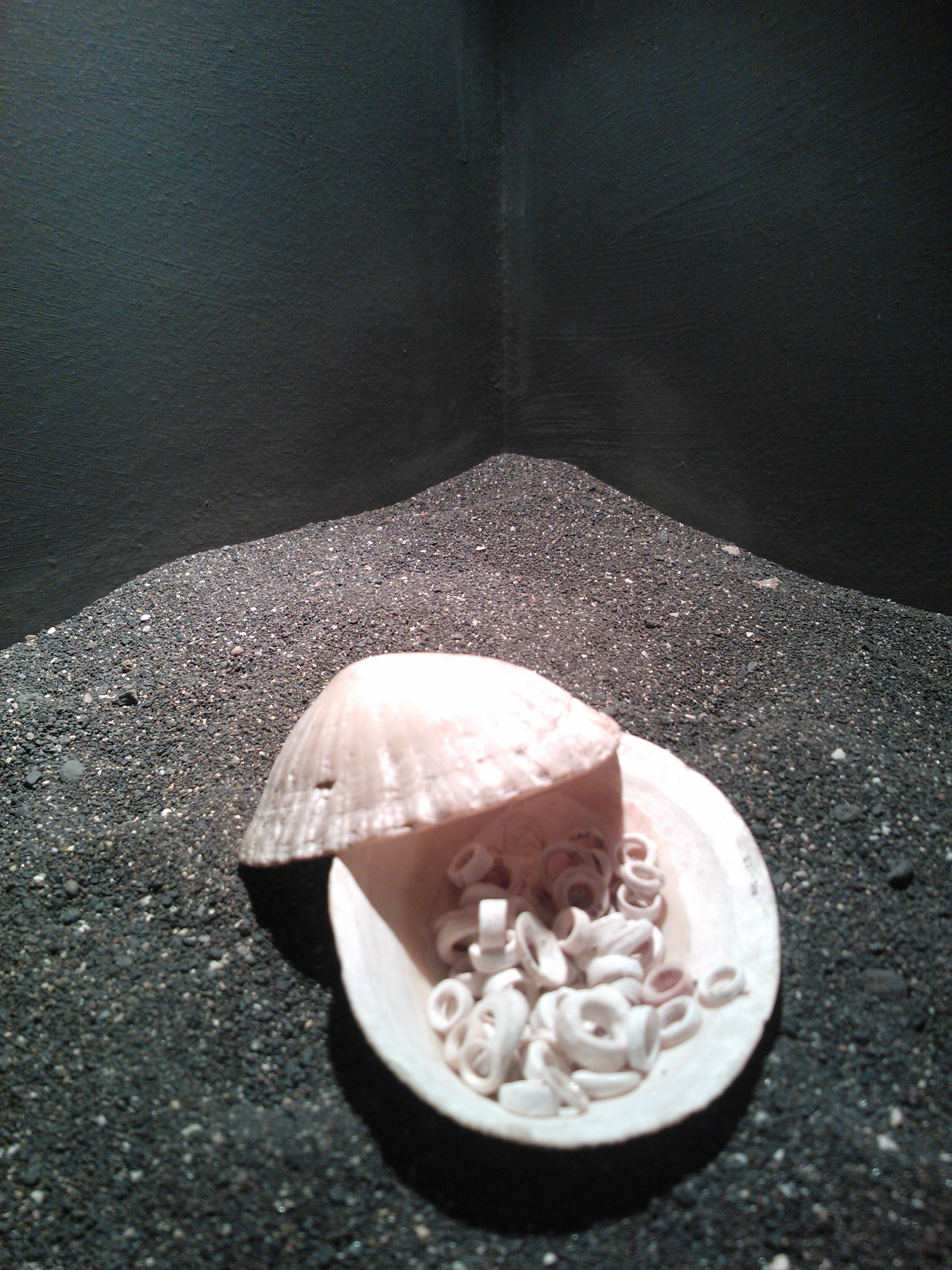
Part two limpet shells that enclose small accounts as a jeweler.

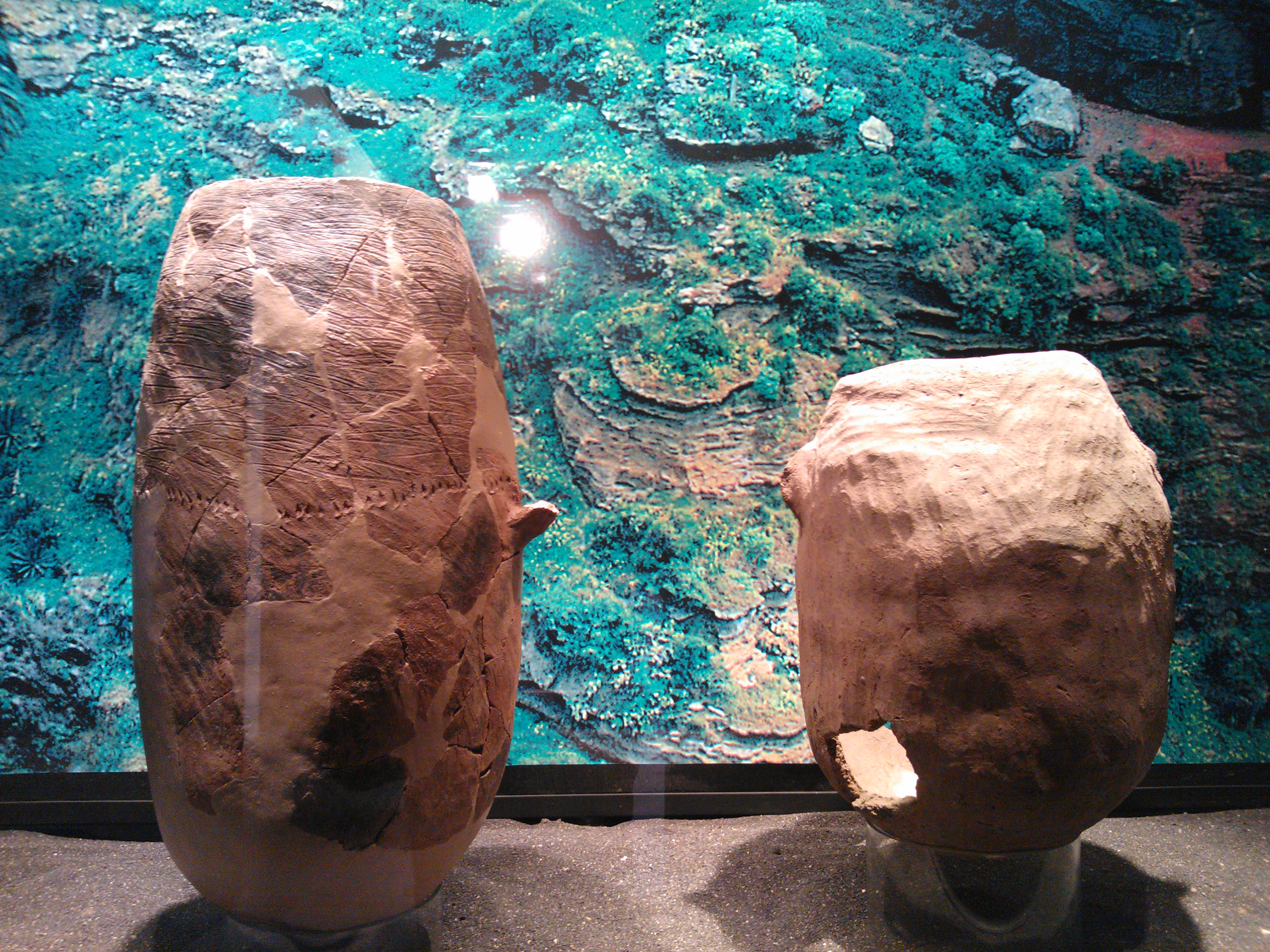
Jars of clay.

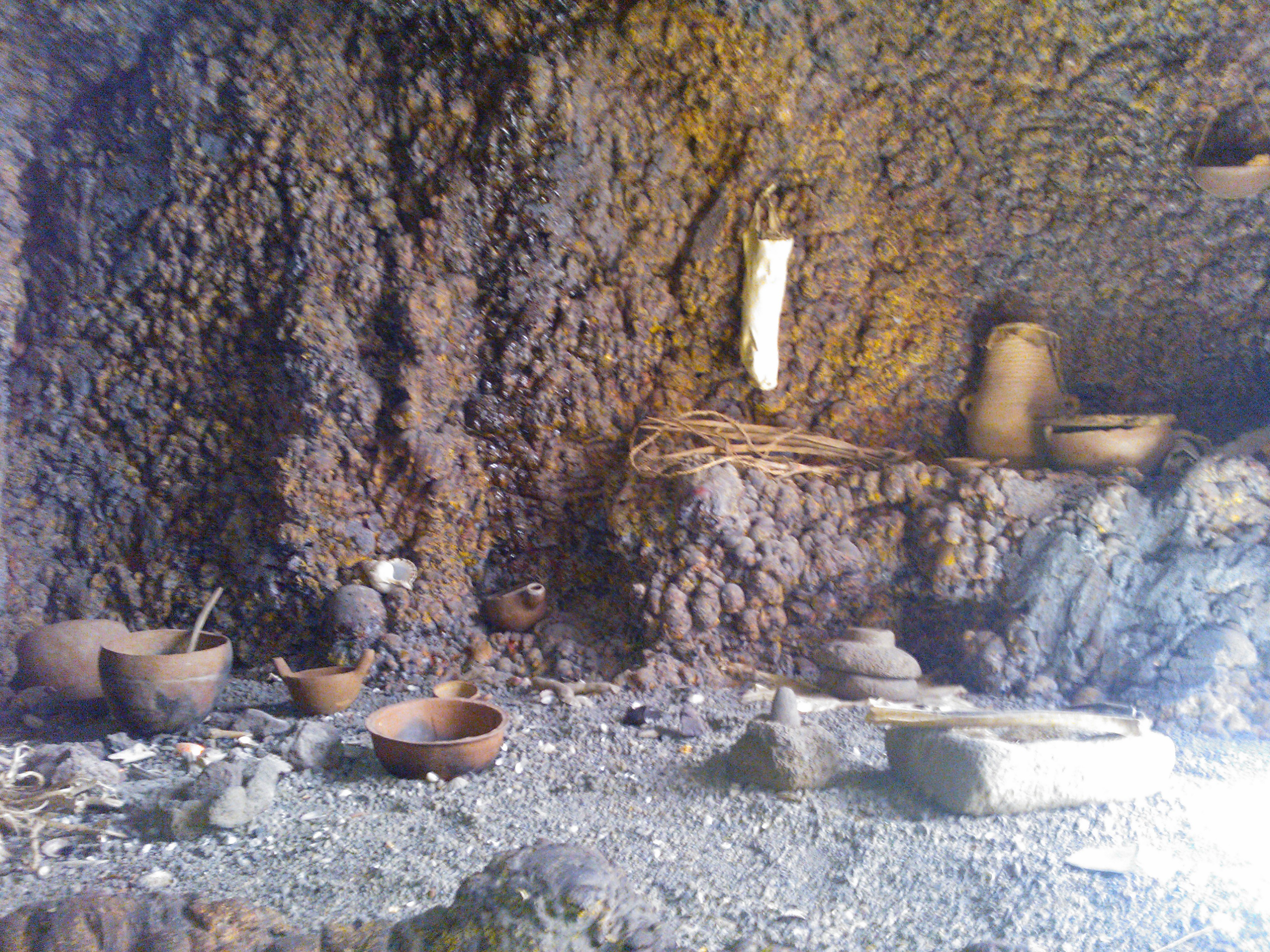
Recreating an aboriginal cave.

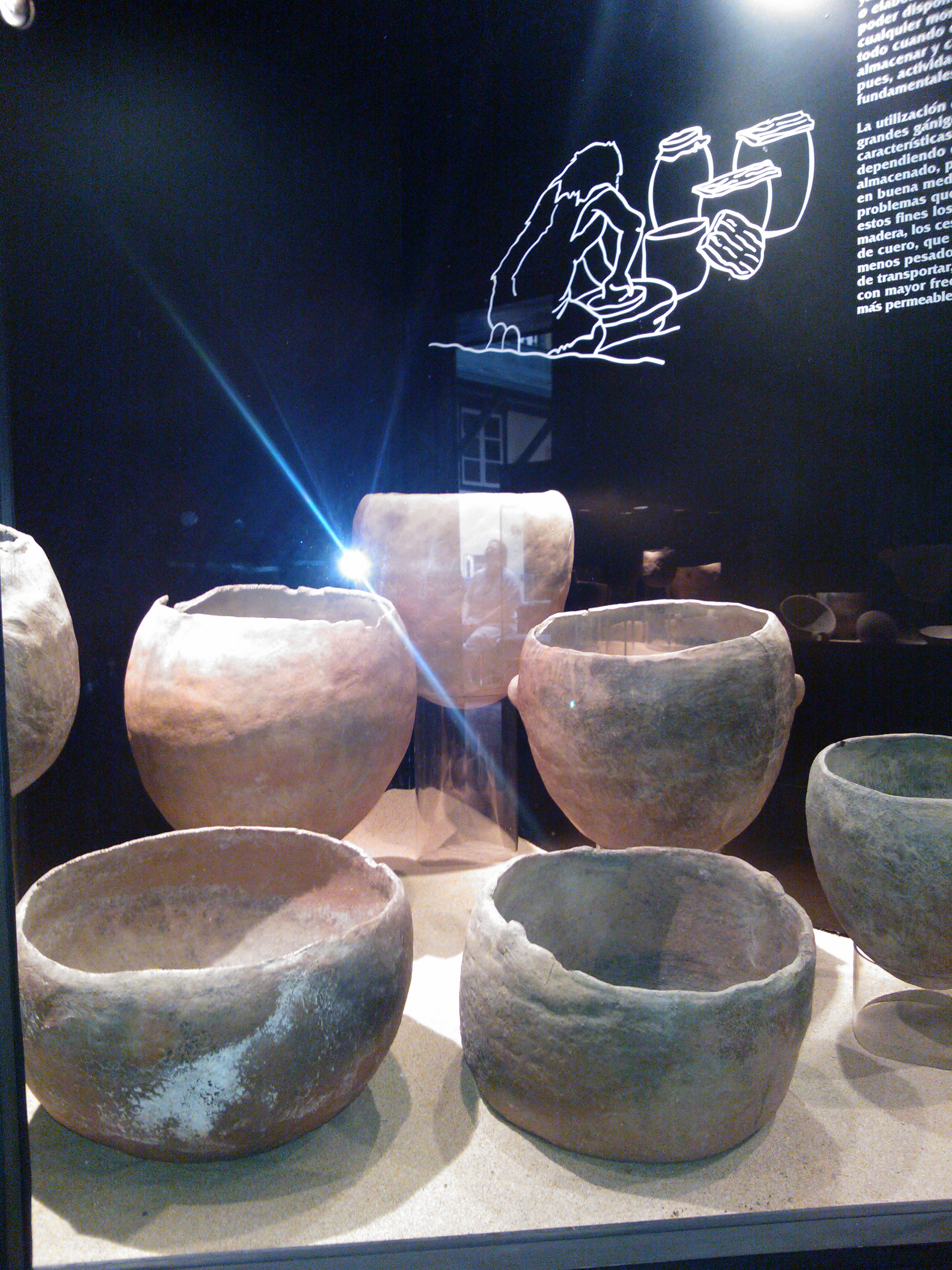
Aboriginal Ceramics.

== See also ==
- Guatimac
- List of museums in Spain

== Museum official website ==
- Media related to Museo Arqueológico del Puerto de la Cruz at Wikimedia Commons
- Archaeological Museum of Puerto de la Cruz
