= Cuevas Blancas Windmill =

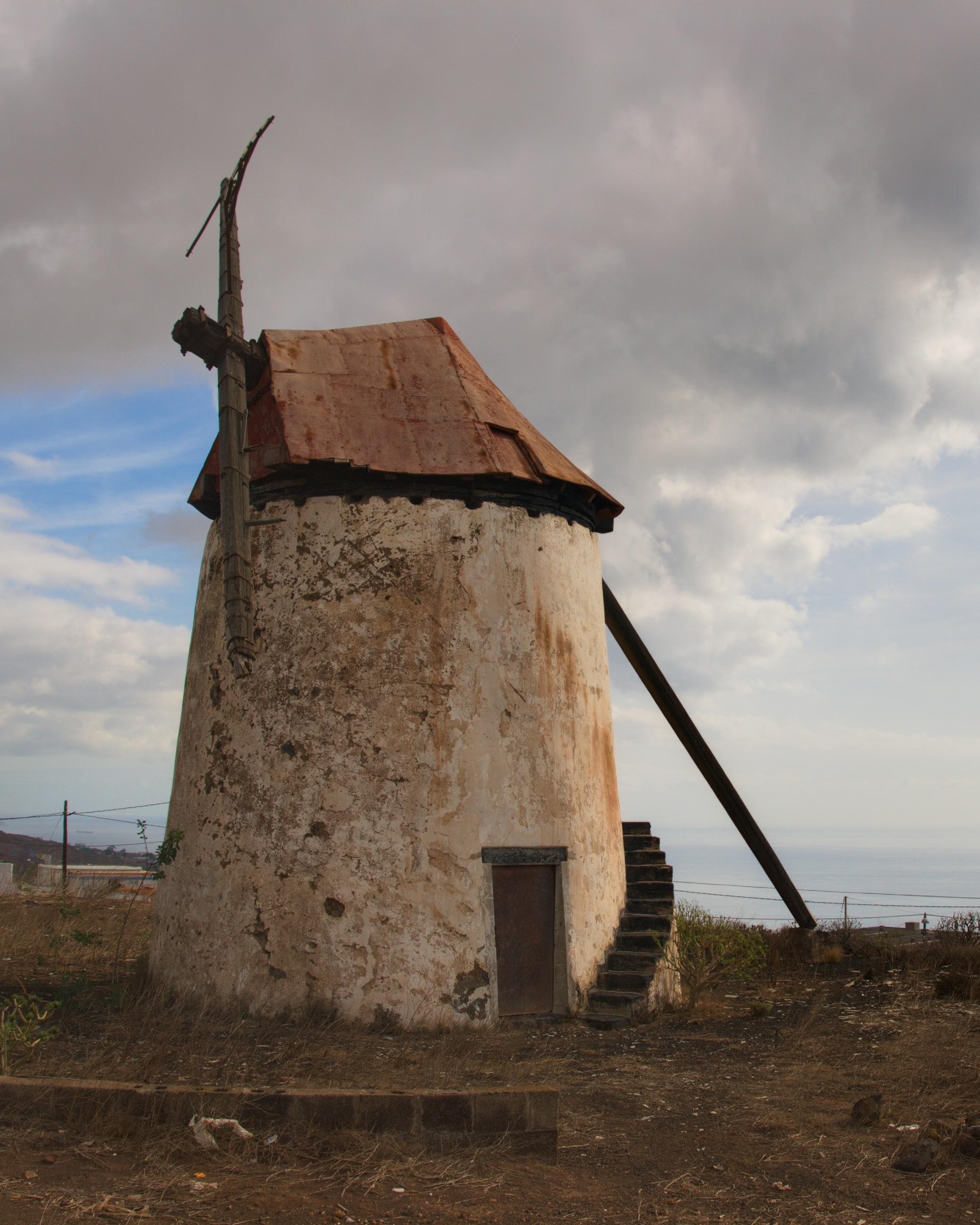

- Location within Tenerife
- 28°25′35″N 16°18′49″W
- Type: windmill
- Location: Santa María del Mar, Tenerife

History
- Rebuilt: 1974

Spanish Cultural Heritage
- Designated: 2007

The Cuevas Blancas Windmill or White Caves Mill (Spanish: Molino de Cuevas Blancas) is located in Santa María del Mar, Santa Cruz de Tenerife, on the island of Tenerife, Spain. It was used to manufacture Gofio, a type of flour from the Canary islands.

The mill is conical, with a diameter of 4 m (13 ft), and a height of around 10 m (33 ft). It has three floors: a warehouse (and occasional miller's bedroom) on the ground floor, a waiting room on the first floor, and the mill machinery on the second floor. The floors are connected with wooden stairs with a width around 1 m (3.3 ft). It has a pointed roof containing a wooden turning mechanism: one side has the blades, while the other has the rudder, with a connecting beam and gearing. It is similar to the Barranco Grande Windmill.

It was restored in 1974, but has since been abandoned, and is falling apart in the middle of a building warehouse. It was listed as Bien de Interés Cultural on 18 December 2007.
