= Guanche language =

Extinct language of the Canary Islands

Guanche
- Native to: Spain
- Region: Canary Islands
- Ethnicity: Guanches
- Extinct: 17th century
- Language family: Afroasiatic?: Berber?; Guanche

Language codes
- ISO 639-3: gnc
- Glottolog: guan1277

Guanche is an extinct language or dialect continuum that was spoken by the Guanches of the Canary Islands until the 16th or 17th century. It died out after the conquest of the Canary Islands as the Guanche ethnic group was assimilated into the dominant Spanish culture. The Guanche language may have been a variety of the Berber languages, or possibly a language isolate influenced by Berber, and is known today through sentences and individual words that were recorded by early geographers, as well as through several place-names and some Guanche words that were retained in the Canary Islanders' Spanish.

== Classification ==
Many linguists propose that Guanche was likely a Berber language, or at least genealogically related to the Berber languages to some extent as an Afroasiatic language. However, recognizable Berber words are primarily agricultural or livestock vocabulary, whereas no Berber grammatical inflections have been identified, and there is a large stock of vocabulary that does not bear any resemblance to Berber whatsoever. It may be that Guanche had a stratum of Berber vocabulary but was otherwise unrelated to Berber. Other strong similarities to the Berber languages are reflected in their counting system, while some authors suggest the Canarian branch would be a sister branch to the surviving continental Berber languages, splitting off during the early development of the language family and before the terminus post quem for the origin of Proto-Berber.

== History ==
The name Guanche originally referred to a "man from Tenerife", and only later did it come to refer to all native inhabitants of the Canary Islands. Different dialects of the language were spoken across the archipelago. Archaeological finds on the Canaries include both Libyco-Berber and Punic inscriptions in rock carvings, although early accounts stated the Guanches themselves did not possess a system of writing.

The first reliable account of the Guanche language was provided by the Genovese explorer Nicoloso da Recco in 1341, with a list of the numbers 1–19, possibly from Fuerteventura. Recco's account reveals a base-10 counting system with strong similarities to Berber numbers.

Silbo, originally a whistled form of Guanche speech used for communicating over long distances, was used on La Gomera, El Hierro, Tenerife, and Gran Canaria. As the Guanche language became extinct, a Spanish version of Silbo was adopted by some inhabitants of the Canary Islands.

== Numerals ==
Guanche numerals are attested from several sources, not always in good agreement (Barrios 1997). Some of the discrepancies may be due to copy errors, some to gender distinctions, and others to Arabic borrowings in later elicitations. Recco's early 1341 record notably uses Italian-influenced spelling.

Number	Recco (1341)	Cairasco (song, 1582)	Cedeño (c. 1685)	Marín de Cubas (1687, 1694)	Sosa (copy of 1678)	Abreu (attrib. to 1632)	Reyes (1995 reconstruction)	Proto-Berber
1	vait*	*be	ben, ven-ir-	becen~been, ben-ir-	ben, ben-ir-	been (ben?), ben-i-	*wên	*yiwan
2	smetti, smatta-	*smi	liin, lin-ir-	liin, sin-ir-~lin-ir-	lini (sijn)	lini, lini-	*sîn	*sin
3	amelotti, amierat-	*amat	amiet	amiet~amiat, am-ir-	amiat (amiet)	amiat	*amiat	*karaḍ
4	acodetti, acodat-	*aco	arba	arba	arba	arba	*akod	*hakkuẓ
5	simusetti, simusat-	*somus	canza~canse	canza	cansa	canza	*sumus	*sammus
6	sesetti, sesatti-	?	sumus	sumui~sumus	sumus	smmous	*sed	*saḍis
7	satti	*set	sat	sat	sat (sá)	sat	*sa	*sah
8	tamatti	*tamo	set	set	set	set	*tam	*tam
9	alda-marava, nait	?	acet~acot	acot	acot	acot	*aldamoraw	*tiẓ(ẓ)ah~tuẓah
10	marava	*marago	marago	marago	marago	marago	*maraw~maragʷ	*maraw

* Also nait,' an apparent copy error. Similarly with alda-morana for expected *alda-marava.

Later attestations of 11–19 were formed by linking the digit and ten with -ir: benirmarago, linirmarago, etc. 20–90 were similar, but contracted: linago, amiago, etc. 100 was maraguin, apparently 10 with the Berber plural -en. Recco only recorded 1–16; the combining forms for 11–16, which did not have this -ir-, are included as the hyphenated forms in the table above.

Spanish does not distinguish [b] and [v], so been is consistent with *veen. The Berber feminine ends in -t, as in Shilha 1: yan (m), yat (f); 2: sin (m), snat (f), and this may explain discrepancies such as been and vait for 'one'.

Cairasco is a misparsed counting song, besmia mat acosomuset tamobenir marago. Ses '6' may have got lost in the middle of somuset ( ← *somussesset).

Starting with Cedeño, new roots for '2' and '9' appear ('9' perhaps the old root for '4'), new roots for '4' and '5' (arba, kansa) appear to be Arabic borrowings, and old '5', '6', '7' offset to '6', '7', '8'.

== Vocabulary ==
Below are selected Guanche vocabulary items from a 16th-century list by Alonso de Espinosa, as edited and translated by Clements Robert Markham (1907):

Guanche	English gloss
adara	lake
afaro	grain
aguere	lake
ahof, aho	milk
ahoren	barley meal roasted with butter
amen	sun
ana	sheep
ara	goat
aran	farm
xaxo	deceased; mummy
banot	spear
cancha	dog
cel	moon
chafa	lofty mountain ridge
chafaña	toasted grain
chamato	woman
coran	man
coraja	red owl
e-c, e-g	I (1st person)
era, iera	your
guan; ben	son (in reality "one of")
guañac	people; state
guaya	spirit, life
guijon, guyon	ships (-n ‘plural’)
guirre	vulture (Neophron percnopterus)
hacichei	beans, vetches
hari	multitude, people
jarco	mummy
manse	shore
mayec	mother
n-amet	bone
o-che	melted butter
petut	father?
t	thou, thy
th	they
tabayba	Euphorbia
tabona	obsidian knife
tagasaste	Cytisus proliferus (var.)
taginaste	Echium strictum
tamarco	coat of skins
tara	barley
taraire, tagaire	alternative name for Mt. Teid
xerco	shoe
xerax	sky
zonfa	navel

Below are some additional basic vocabulary words in various Guanche dialects, from Wölfel (1965):

Guanche	gloss	dialect (island)
guan, cotan	man	
chamato	woman	
hari	people, multitude	Tenerife
doramas	nostrils	Gran Canaria
adargoma	shoulder	Gran Canaria
atacaicate	heart	Gran Canaria
garuaic	fist	
zonfa	navel	Tenerife
agoñe	bone	Tenerife
taber	good	La Palma
tigotan	sky	La Palma
Achamán	sky, God	Tenerife
magec	sun	Tenerife, Gran Canaria?
ahemon	water	Hierro
aala(mon)	water	Gomera, Hierro
ade	water	La Palma
ide	fire	Tenerife
tacande	volcanic field	La Palma
cancha	dog	Gran Canaria, Tenerife
garehagua	dog	La Palma
