= Autopista TF-1 =

Road in Tenerife

Autopista TF-1
- Autopista del Sur de Tenerife
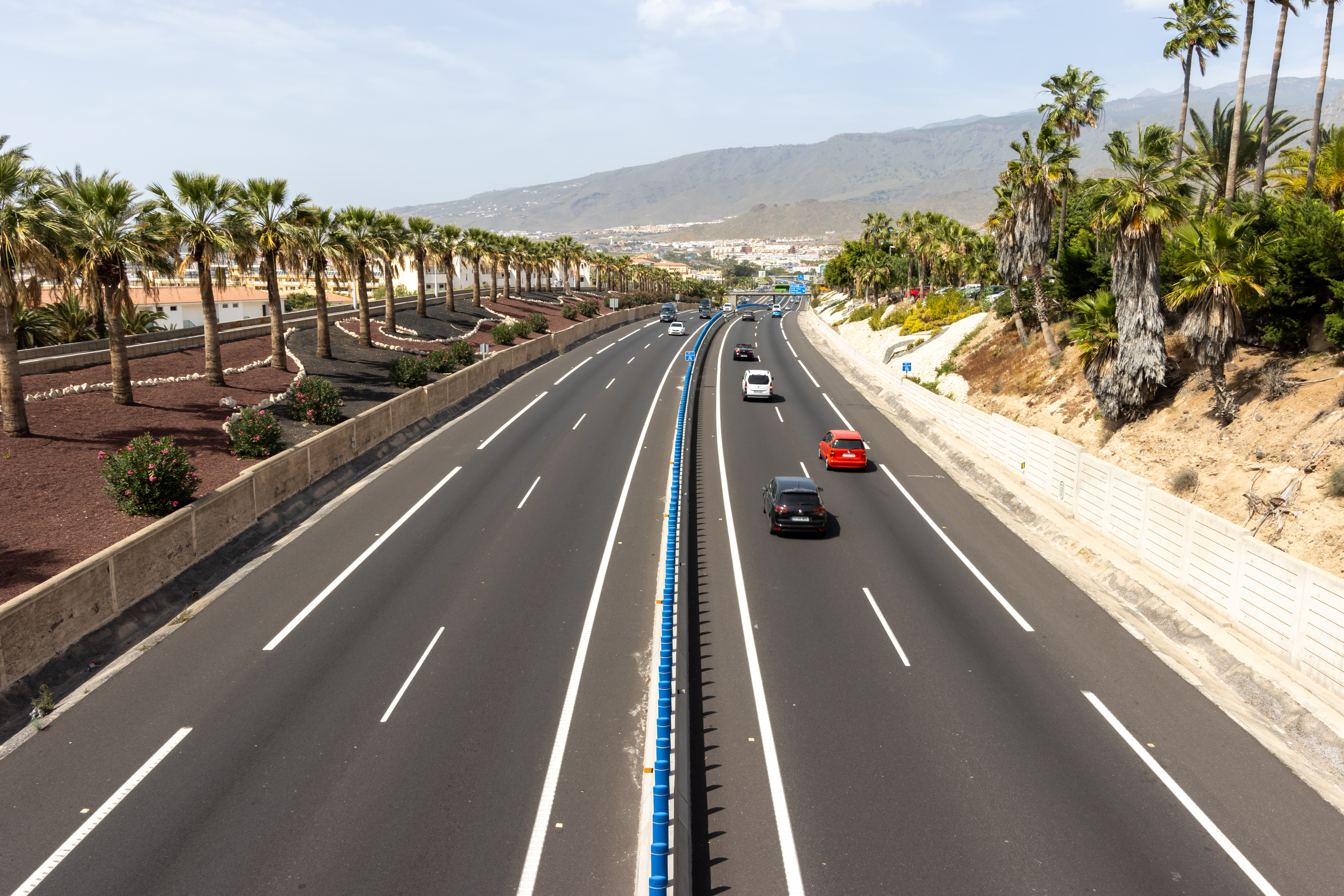

Route information
- Length: 103 km (64 mi)

Major junctions
- From: Santa Cruz de Tenerife
- To: Santiago del Teide

Location
- Country: Spain
- Autonomous community: Canary Islands
- Province: Santa Cruz de Tenerife

Highway system
- Highways in Spain; Autopistas and autovías; National Roads; Transport in the Canary Islands

The TF-1 (or Autopista del Sur, "Southern Motorway") is a motorway encircling the eastern and the southern parts of the island of Tenerife (Canary Islands). The TF-1 motorway runs from the capital Santa Cruz in the north to Adeje with its major tourist resorts Los Cristianos and Playa de las Américas in the south of the island, and continues to Santiago del Teide in the west. It is a 103 km motorway and interchange numbers go facing south. The motorway is one in the Canary Islands that passes through most of the municipalities and is the longest in the archipelago.

== Description ==
The motorway begins with the junction with the northern motorway TF-5 and the short TF-4 near the Canary Islands' only refinery and is 1 km south from the centre of Santa Cruz. The TF-1 follows the coastline to the Tenerife South Reina Sofia airport, then to Adeje and ends near Santiago del Teide.

=== Municipalities ===
- Santa Cruz de Tenerife (City)
- El Rosario
- Candelaria
- Arafo
- Fasnia
- Güímar
- Arico
- San Miguel de Abona
- Arona
- Adeje
- Guía de Isora
- Santiago del Teide
