= Virgin of Candelaria =

Marian apparition

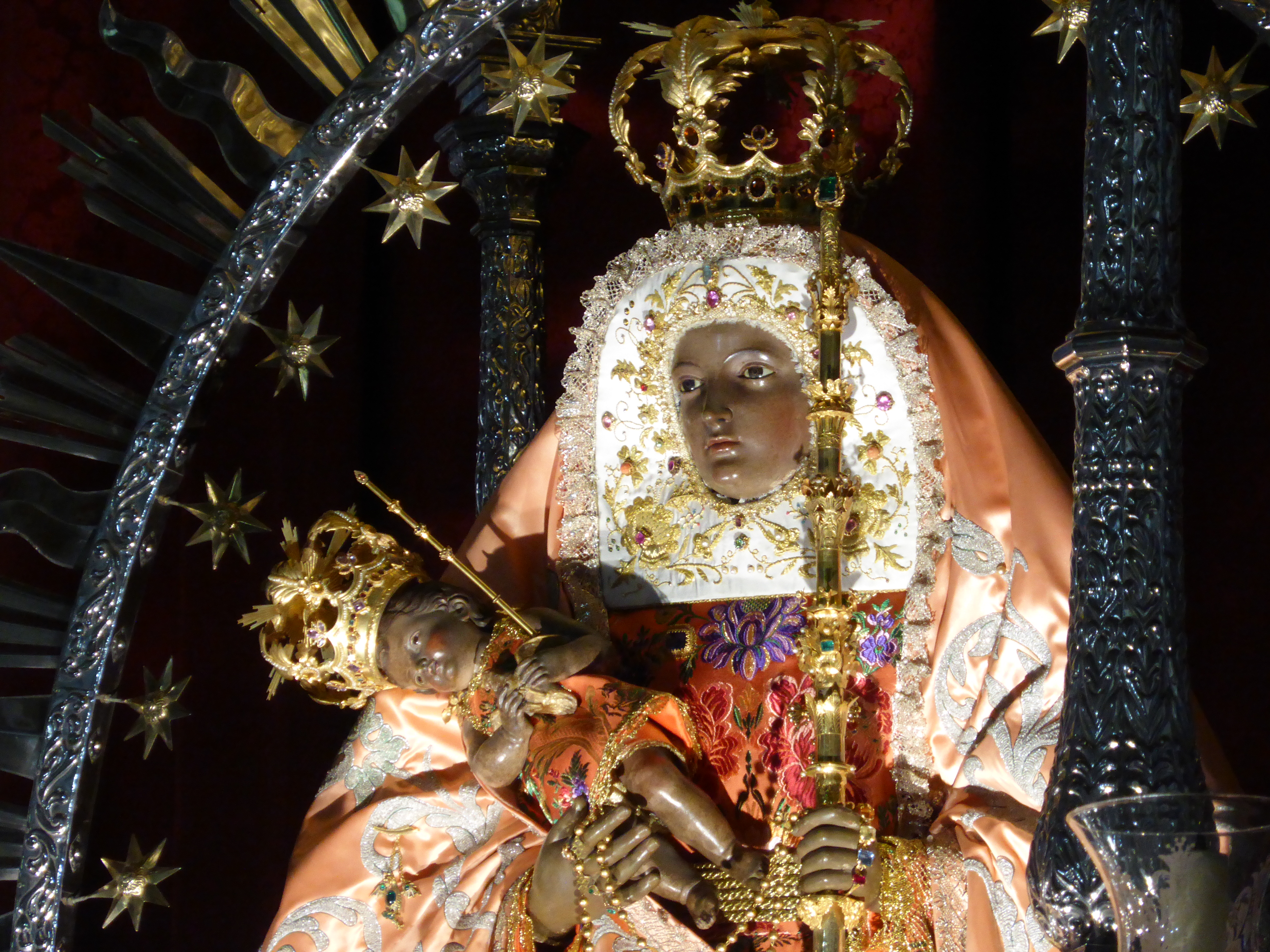

Virgin of Candelaria, Patroness Saint of the Canary Islands.
- Venerated in: Catholic Church
- Major shrine: Basilica of Candelaria (Basílica de Nuestra Señora de la Candelaria), Tenerife (Canary Islands). This is its main sanctuary, a place where it has its origin as a Marian invocation.
- Feast: August 14–15 (on Tenerife and the Canary Islands), and on 2 February (also on this day in Tenerife, although minor festival). February 2 in Candelaria, Quezon, February 2 in Jaro, Iloilo City and the whole Western Visayas in the Philippines. Every February 2 (Tatala) February 1–3 Silang, Cavite
- Attributes: Black Madonna with baby in her right hand and a candle in her left hand, embroidered mantle, gilded coronation crown
- Patronage: Canary Islands as well as Cabildo de Tenerife; Oruro and La Paz (Bolivia), Medellín (Colombia), Puno (Peru), Lajas (Puerto Rico), Mayagüez (Puerto Rico), Manatí (Puerto Rico), Western Visayas (Philippines), Tatala, Binangonan, Rizal (Philippines), Paracale, Camarines Norte (Philippines), Silang, Cavite (Philippines) and Batasan, Macabebe, Pampanga (Philippines)

The Virgin of Candelaria or Our Lady of Candlemas (Spanish: Virgen de Candelaria or Nuestra Señora de la Candelaria; Filipino: Mahal na Birhen ng Candelaria), popularly called La Morenita, celebrates the Virgin Mary on the island of Tenerife, one of the Canary Islands (Spain). The center of worship is located in the city of Candelaria in Tenerife. She is depicted as a Black Madonna. The "Royal Basilica Marian Shrine of Our Lady of Candelaria" (Basilica of Candelaria) is considered the main church dedicated to the Virgin Mary in the Canary Islands and she is the patroness saint of the Canary Islands. Her feast is celebrated on February 2 (Fiesta de la Candelaria) and August 15, the patronal feast of the Canary Islands.

Her devotion is deeply rooted in other parts of Spain, and in countries such as Bolivia, Colombia, Cuba, Mexico, Peru, the Philippines, Venezuela and others. Her patronage also extends to various cities and countries in America and other continents. This has made the Virgin of Candelaria the second most widespread Marian devotion on the American continent, after the Our Lady of Guadalupe, patroness saint of Mexico.

== Legend and appearance ==
According to a legend recorded by Alonso de Espinosa in 1594, a statue of the Virgin Mary, bearing a child in one hand and a green candle in the other (hence "Candelaria"), was discovered on the beach of Chimisay (Güímar) by two Guanche goatherds in 1392. This was before the Castilian conquest of the island of Tenerife (the island was not fully conquered until 1496).

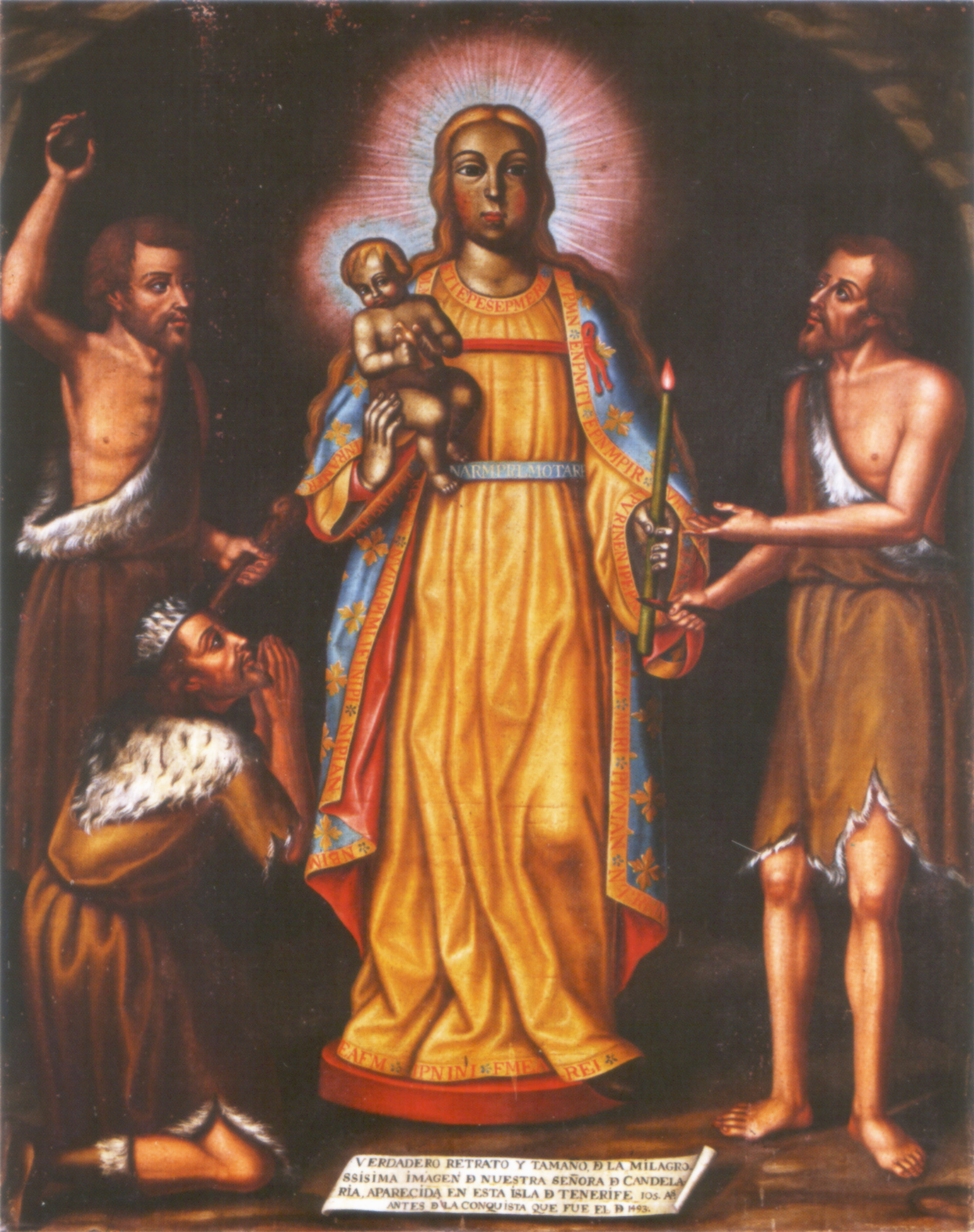
Eighteenth-century painting depicting the apparition of the Virgin to the Guanches

One of the shepherds tried to throw a stone at the statue, but his arm became paralysed; the other tried to stab the statue with a knife but ended up stabbing himself. The statue was taken by the local guanche mencey to the cueva de Chinguaro.

Later, Antón, a Guanche who had been enslaved and converted to Christianity by the Castilians, returned to Tenerife and recognized the statue as that of the Virgin Mary. He told the mencey of his conversion and the statue was thus venerated by the Guanches, who moved it to the cave of Achbinico (also known as San Blas – "Saint Blaise"). However, the statue was stolen and taken away to Lanzarote. It was later returned to Tenerife after various events, including an outbreak of the plague, occurred on Lanzarote. At first, the autochthons identified the statue with their goddess Chaxiraxi (the mother of the gods), but later the Christian conquerors imposed the idea that the statue was that of the Virgin Mary.

After the appearance of the Virgin and its iconographic identification with this biblical event, the festival began to be celebrated with a Marian character in 1497, when the conqueror Alonso Fernández de Lugo, celebrated the first Candlemas festival dedicated especially to the Virgin Mary, coinciding with the Feast of Purification, on February 2. Before the conquest of Tenerife, the Guanche aborigines celebrated a festivity around the image of the Virgin during the Beñesmen festival in the month of August. This was the harvest party, which marked the beginning of the year. Currently, the feast of the Virgin of Candelaria in Canary Islands is celebrated in addition to February 2 also on August 15, the day of the Assumption of the Virgin Mary in the Catholic calendar. For some historians, the celebrations celebrated in honor of the Virgin during the month of August are a syncretized reminiscence of the ancient feasts of the Beñesmen.

The original statue was a medieval gothic sculpture with dark colour and clothing similar to that of the Virgin of Lluch (patron saint of Mallorca) and the Virgin of Montserrat (patroness saint of Catalonia).

== Veneration ==
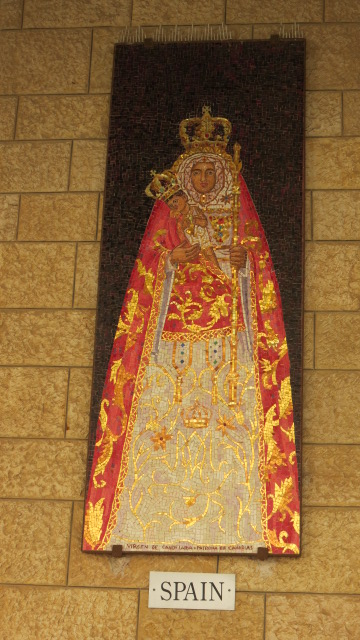
Ceramic mosaic depicting the Virgin of Candelaria of Tenerife, found in the Basilica of the Annunciation in Nazareth (Israel)

The first Mass was celebrated at Achbinico on February 2, 1497, and the Adelantado Alonso Fernández de Lugo ordered the construction of a hermitage there, but it was not built until 1526, during the rule of Pedro Fernández de Lugo. This was the site of the Basilica of Our Lady of Candelaria. The basilica was destroyed by fire and rebuilt in the 19th century. The statue itself was lost when a tsunami carried it out to sea in 1826; the present statue is a copy by Fernando Estévez. The statue of the Virgin is dressed in rich robes of different colors and jewels.

She was declared patroness of the Canary Islands in 1599, by Clement VIII (and principal patroness in 1867 by Pope Pius IX). The Virgin of Candelaria is widely petitioned to pray for the protection against epidemics, plagues, droughts and volcanic eruptions of Mount Teide and other volcanoes, in a manner similar to the invocation of St. Januarius of Naples to pray for the end of the eruptions of Vesuvius and of St. Agatha of Catania against eruptions of Mount Etna in Sicily.

Between October 1964 and January 1965, the Diocese of Tenerife conducted the largest pilgrimage in the history of the Canary Islands. This time, the statue of the Virgin was walked across the towns, cities and municipalities of the island of Tenerife for the first time in history.

In the basilica of the Annunciation in Nazareth (Israel) is a mosaic of the Virgin of Candelaria, patroness saint of the Canary Islands, along with those of other Marian devotions famous in Spain.

Every year on February 2 and August 15 is celebrated a big party in honor of the Virgin. These days there are thousands of pilgrims and tourists coming to Candelaria from all points of the Canary Islands and other parts of Spain and the world. The feast day is marked by a solemn procession and a religious ceremony, although its most famous component is a re-enactment of the discovery of the statue, with locals dressing up as guanche natives.

In addition to that, every seven years the image of the Virgin of Candelaria is transferred to Santa Cruz de Tenerife (capital of the island) and San Cristóbal de La Laguna (seat of the Diocese of Tenerife), alternating every seven years between the two cites: in 2002 it was Santa Cruz and in 2009 La Laguna and so to successively.

=== Apostolic visit by Pope Leo XIV to Tenerife 2026 ===
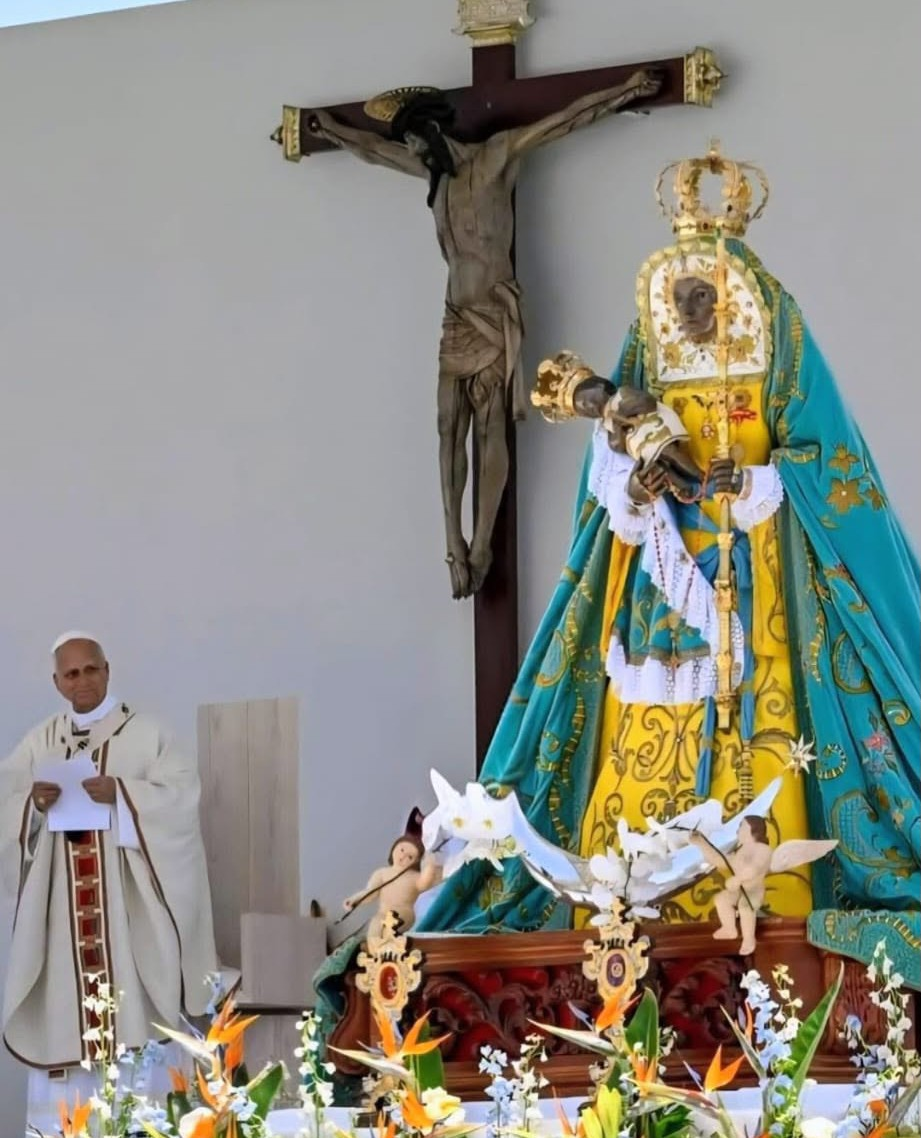
Pope Leo XIV with the Virgin of Candelaria, patron saint of the Canary Islands. Behind them, the Christ of La Laguna. Closing Mass of his apostolic visit to Spain in the Port of Santa Cruz de Tenerife.

During the farewell Mass of Pope Leo XIV's apostolic journey to Spain on June 12, 2026, the pontiff venerated the image of Virgin of Candelaria, patron saint of Canary Islands, that presided over the ceremony, along with the Christ of La Laguna, another of the islands' most venerated images. The ceremony was held in the port of Santa Cruz de Tenerife, and this marked the first papal visit to the archipelago.

Days later, the Pope sent separate letters of thanks to the President of the Canary Islands and to the two dioceses of the archipelago, in which he invoked the intercession of Our Lady of Candelaria over the entire Canary Archipelago when imparting the Apostolic Blessing.

=== Strange letters on the original carving of the Virgin ===
In the carved drapery of the Virgin of Candelaria original there were strange sequences of letters whose meaning is still unknown. These were:

- Band on the neck: ETIEPFSEPMERI
- In the belt: NARMPRLMOTARE
- On the left sleeve, by the candle: LPVRINENIPEPNEIFANT
- In the mantle, in the right arm: OLM INRANFR IAEBNPFM RFVEN NVINAPIMLIFINVIPI NIPIAN
- At the edge of the left hand: FVPMIRNA ENVPMTI EPNMPIR VRVIVINRN APVIMFRI PIVNIAN NTRHN
- At the bottom of the robe: EAFM IRENINI FMEAREI
- On the back of the cape: NBIMEI ANNEIPERFMIVIFVF

There have been numerous theories proposed regarding possible meanings over the years, including that the evangelizing friars of the Canary Islands wrote devotions to the Virgin Mary in the context of the original (Insular-Amazigh) Guanche language, while attempting to transcribe them into Roman letters.

== Shrines ==
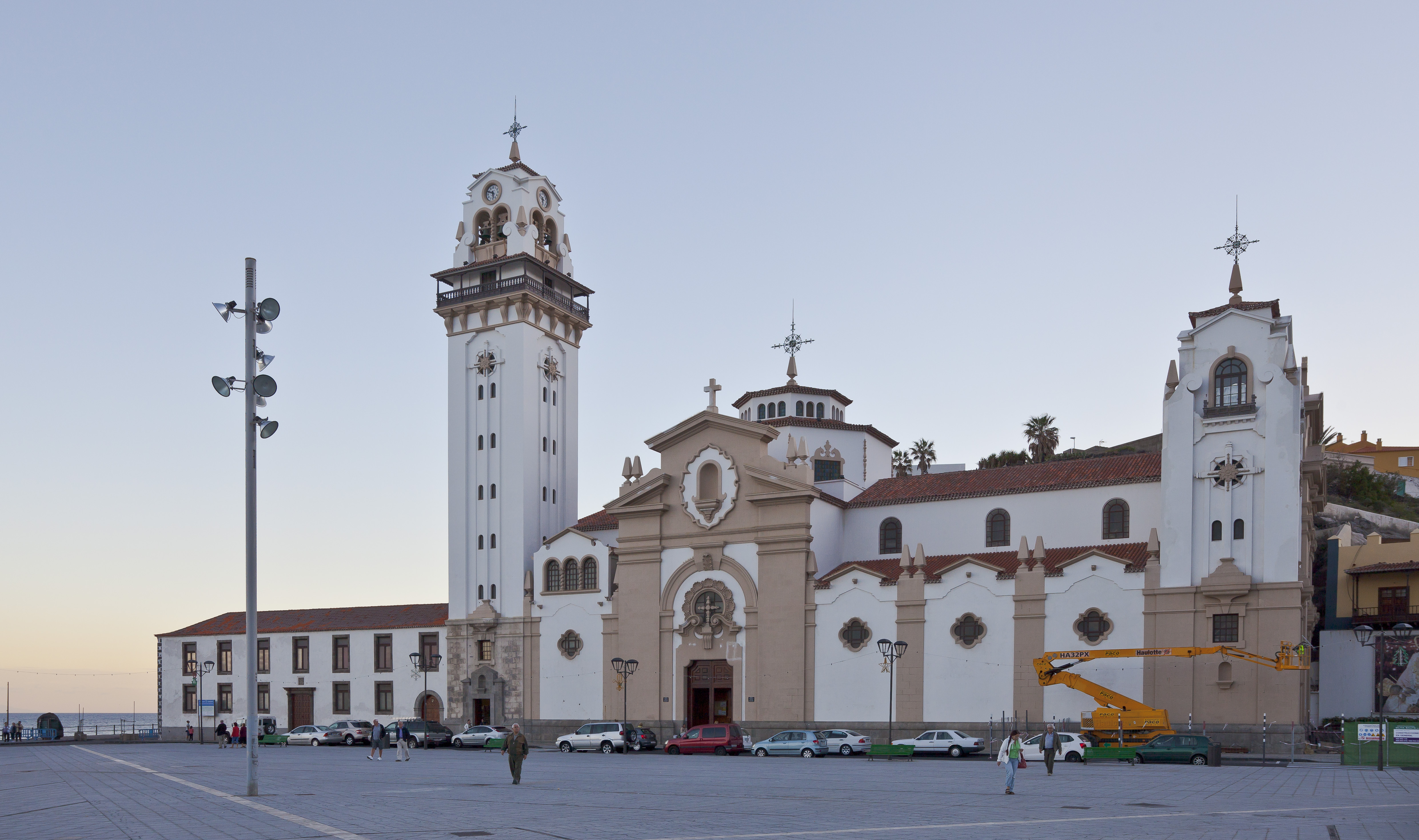
Basilica of Candelaria (Tenerife)

=== Basilica of Candelaria and Cueva de Achbinico ===
The first great Sanctuary to the Virgin of Candelaria was constructed in 1668. After a fire destroyed the ancient basilica, a larger church (the current basilica) was built. The current basilica dates to 1959. It was constructed on a former hermitage, and can hold 5,000 people.

The Cave of San Blas was the first Christian church of the Canaries. It was here that the early inhabitants of the Canary Isles first revered the Virgin of Candelaria. The cave is located behind Candelaria's Basilica and is a site of pilgrimage. Achbinico's cave has historical significance as it was here that many baptisms of guanches took place.

=== National Shrine of Our Lady of the Candles (Jaro Cathedral) ===
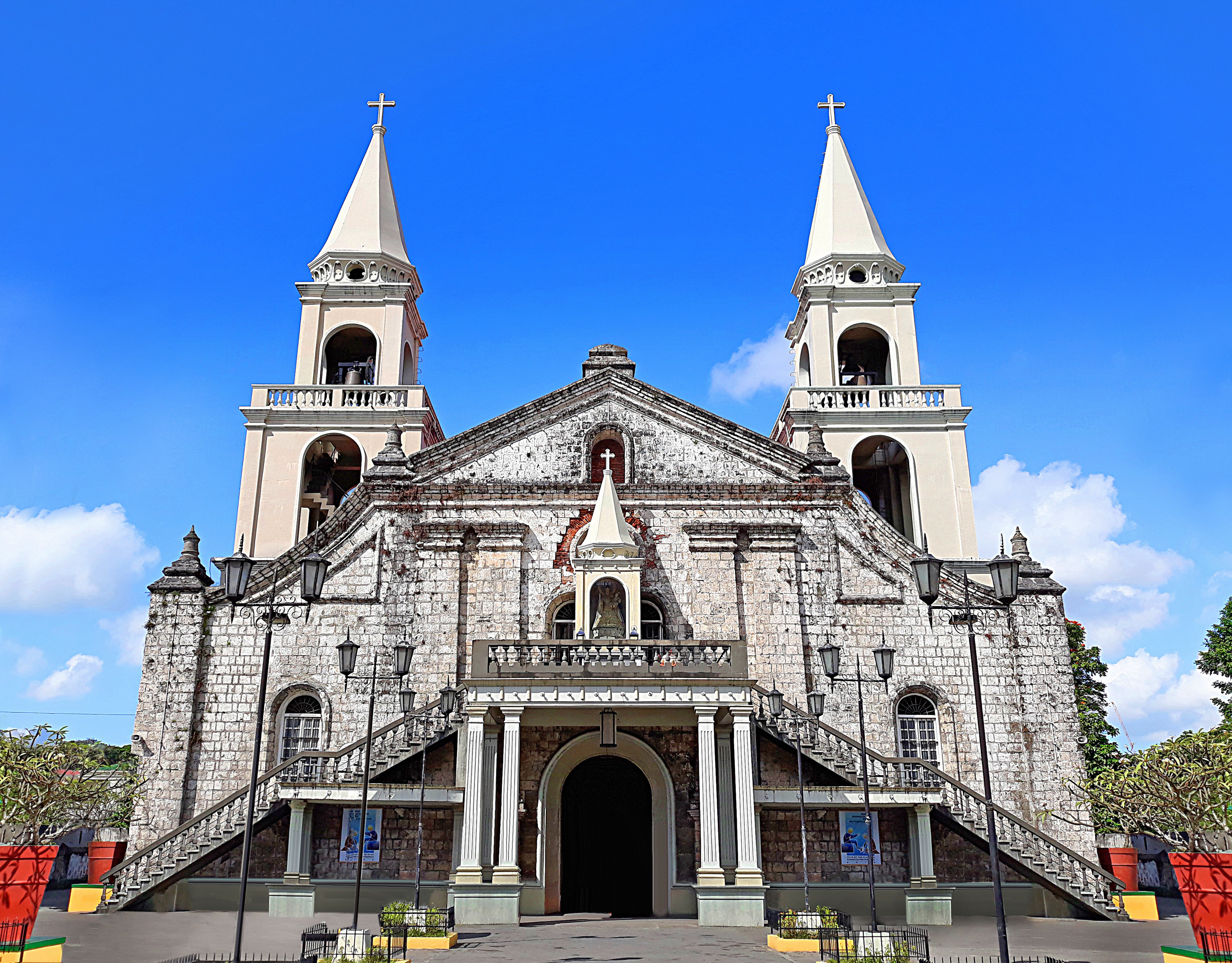
The Jaro Cathedral (National Shrine of Our Lady of the Candles)

The Jaro Cathedral (National Shrine of Our Lady of the Candles) in Jaro, Iloilo City, Philippines, which is the mother church under the catholic Archdiocese of Jaro that oversees the provinces of Iloilo, Antique, Guimaras and Negros Occidental in Western Visayas region, is dedicated to the Virgin of Candelaria, the patroness of the Western Visayas region, Romblon, and Negros Occidental. The feast of Candelaria held every February 2 is one of the largest Roman Catholic feasts dedicated to Marian devotion in the Philippines. The Candelaria of Jaro's image was found in 1587, the year when the town of Jaro was established as a parish. Later, she was transferred to the newly built Jaro Cathedral during the Spanish colonial era in the Philippines around 1700s and 1800s. The cathedral where she is enshrined has been declared a National Shrine of the Catholic Bishops Conference of the Philippines (the only Marian shrine in Visayas and Mindanao).

Her image perched atop the facade of Jaro Cathedral is the first and only marian image crowned personally without a papal legate by a pope and saint in the Philippines and Asia, by Pope John Paul II. The image of Our Lady of Candelaria of Jaro is considered as the oldest Virgin of Candelaria image in the country.

=== Diocesan Shrine of Our Lady of Candelaria (Silang, Cavite) ===
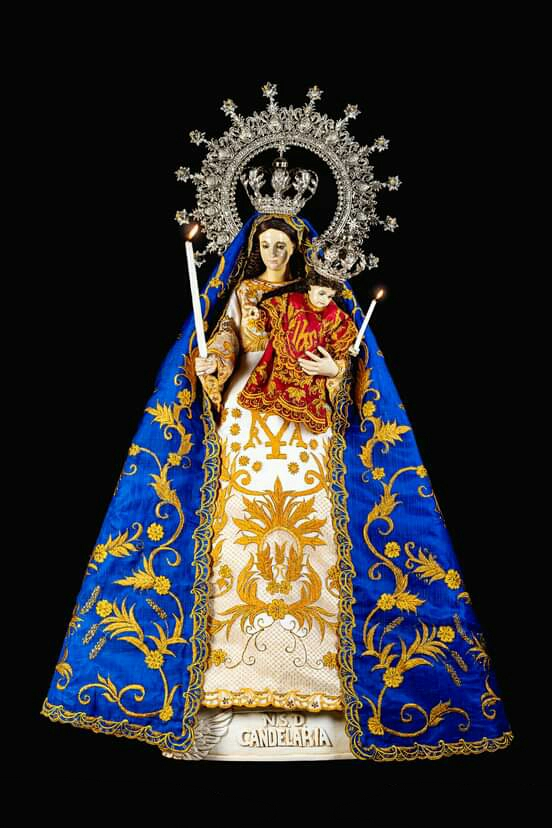
Our Lady of Candelaria of Silang, Patroness of Silang, Cavite

The Diocesan Shrine of Our Lady of Candelaria was founded in 1595 and dedicated in honor to Our Lady of Candelaria in 1640. Also commonly known as the Silang Church, it is a Roman Catholic parish in the municipality of Silang, Cavite, in the Philippines under the Roman Catholic Diocese of Imus. It is known for its Spanish colonial architectural style and the rococo influenced retablos. The Church with its retablos was declared as a National Cultural Treasure by the National Museum of the Philippines on 4 February 2011. The image of Our Lady of Candelaria of Silang is considered as the oldest image in the Province of Cavite and the second oldest Virgin of Candelaria image in the country.

=== Virgen de Candelaria Chapel (Tatala, Binangonan, Rizal) ===
This is the only chapel in Binangonan, Rizal, that venerates the image of Virgen de Candelaria. Its feast day is celebrated every February 2 with the blessing of the candles and a Solemn Mass. After the Mass, there is a traditional Pandanggo or Processional dance in honor to the Our Lady of Candelaria of Tatala.

== In the Americas and Philippines ==
The cult of the Virgin of Candelaria swept America due to the emigration of Canarians. They brought the devotion as a symbol of their culture, somewhat similar to the diffusion of the cult of Saint Patrick by Irish emigrants. On the other hand, the Candelaria image brought to the Philippines has a white image with a child.

She is widely venerated in South America and the Caribbean, where she is the patroness of Oruro and La Paz (Bolivia),Cartagena de Indias and Medellín (both in Colombia) (Medellín was founded as Villa de Nuestra Señora de La Candelaria de Medellín), Mayagüez (Puerto Rico) (which was founded as Nuestra Señora de la Candelaria de Mayagüez), and Manatí (Puerto Rico) (which was founded as Iglesia de Nuestra Señora de la Candelaria y San Matías).

In the Cathedral of San Fernando of Texas (the oldest Catholic cathedral in the United States) is a replica of the Virgin of Candelaria, which is a facsimile of that venerated in the Canary Islands. This is because the city of San Antonio was founded by Canarians.

In the Philippines, she is the patroness of Western Visayas and Negros Occidental, and a white version with a child is found in the Jaro Cathedral in Iloilo City: it is either of local heavenly origin since its discovery was miraculous being found floating in a river, changing in weight and growing in size or it may be brought by the Spanish immigrants during Spanish colonial rule in the Philippines. Her feast is celebrated every February 2 with pageantry where the Fiesta queen is chosen from prominent Spanish-Filipino families in the district of Jaro. The image and statue is located atop the cathedral and is the only Marian statue crowned by pope and saint in the Philippines, during the visit of Pope John Paul II.

The first church of Dilao (now the District of Paco in Manila) was initially dedicated to the Virgen de Candelaria, until its Parish was named to San Fernando. Until now, the Virgin is considered the secondary patroness and attributions are manifested throughout the post war church structure. She was the secondary Patroness of Municipality of Candelaria, Quezon, hence why the locals celebrate their Candle Festival annually in honor of Our Lady during February 2. She is also the patroness of the Western Visayas region and Tatala, one of the barangays in Binangonan, Rizal (also in the Philippines), which celebrates her feast day every February 2. The Municipality of Silang in the province of Cavite, Philippines, also celebrates her feast day from February 1 to 3, with February 2 being the main feast day. It is also celebrated in the city of Cabadbaran, province of Agusan del Norte Philippines every 2nd of February. They also hold their Dagkot Festival on the same day. In El Salvador in the department of Sonsonate, "La Virgen de Candelaria" is the patroness too.

== Syncretism ==
The Virgin of Candelaria is identified or syncretized with other holy entities from other religions:

- In Guanche mythology, the Virgin of Candelaria was identified as Chaxiraxi, and her son Chijoraji.
- In Cuban Santería, the Virgin of Candelaria is identified with Oyá as well as Oba.
- In Brazilian Candomblé, the Virgin of Candelaria is identified with Oshun.
- For Andean religions, this dedication is linked to the cult to the Pachamama (Mother Earth).

== Gallery ==
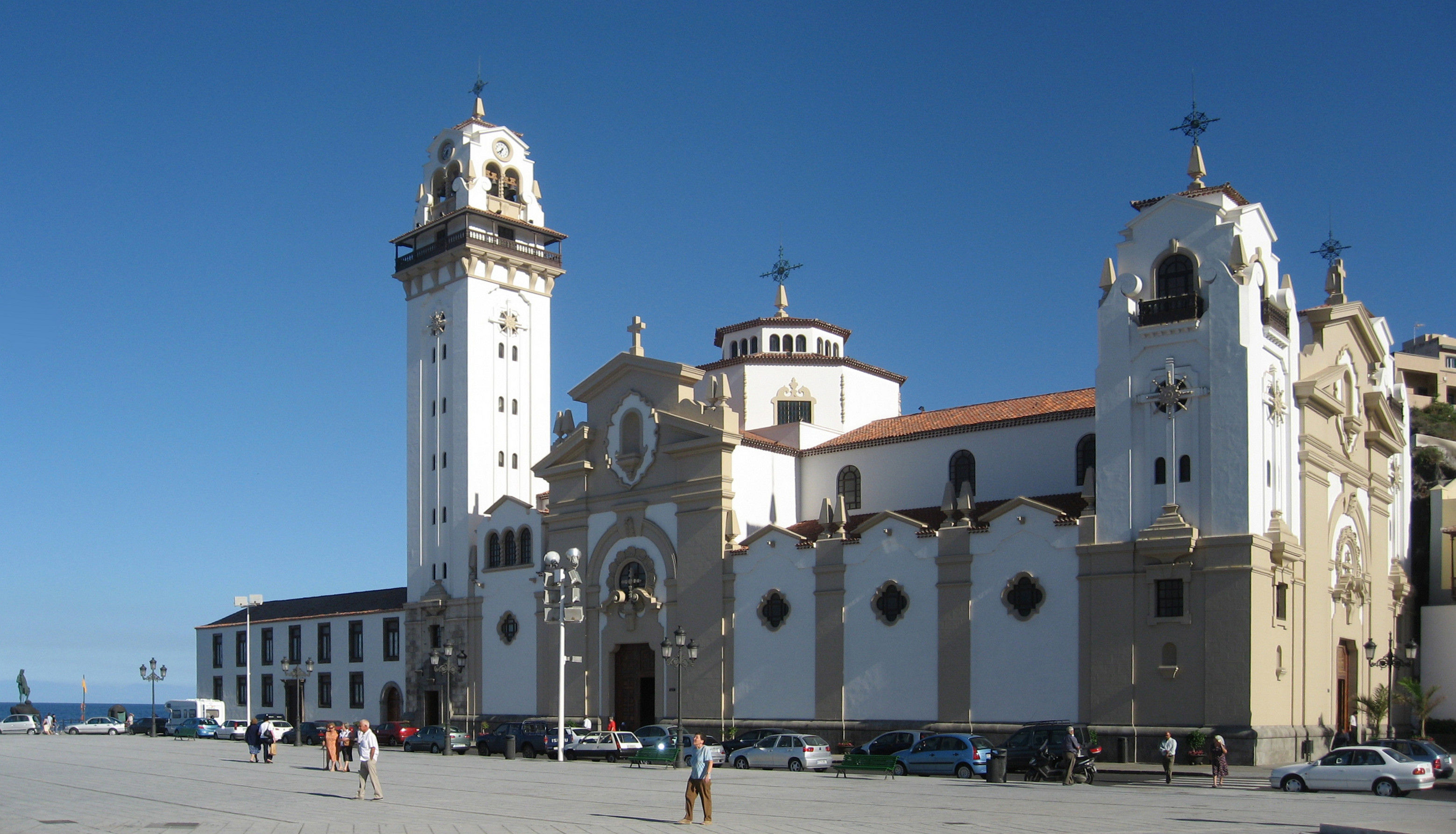
Basílica de Nuestra Señora de la Candelaria, Tenerife

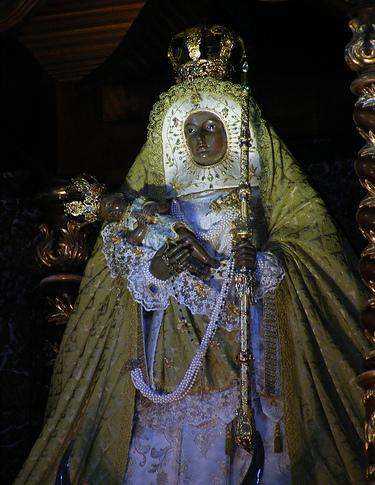
Basílica de Nuestra Señora de la Candelaria, Virgen de la Candelaria, Tenerife

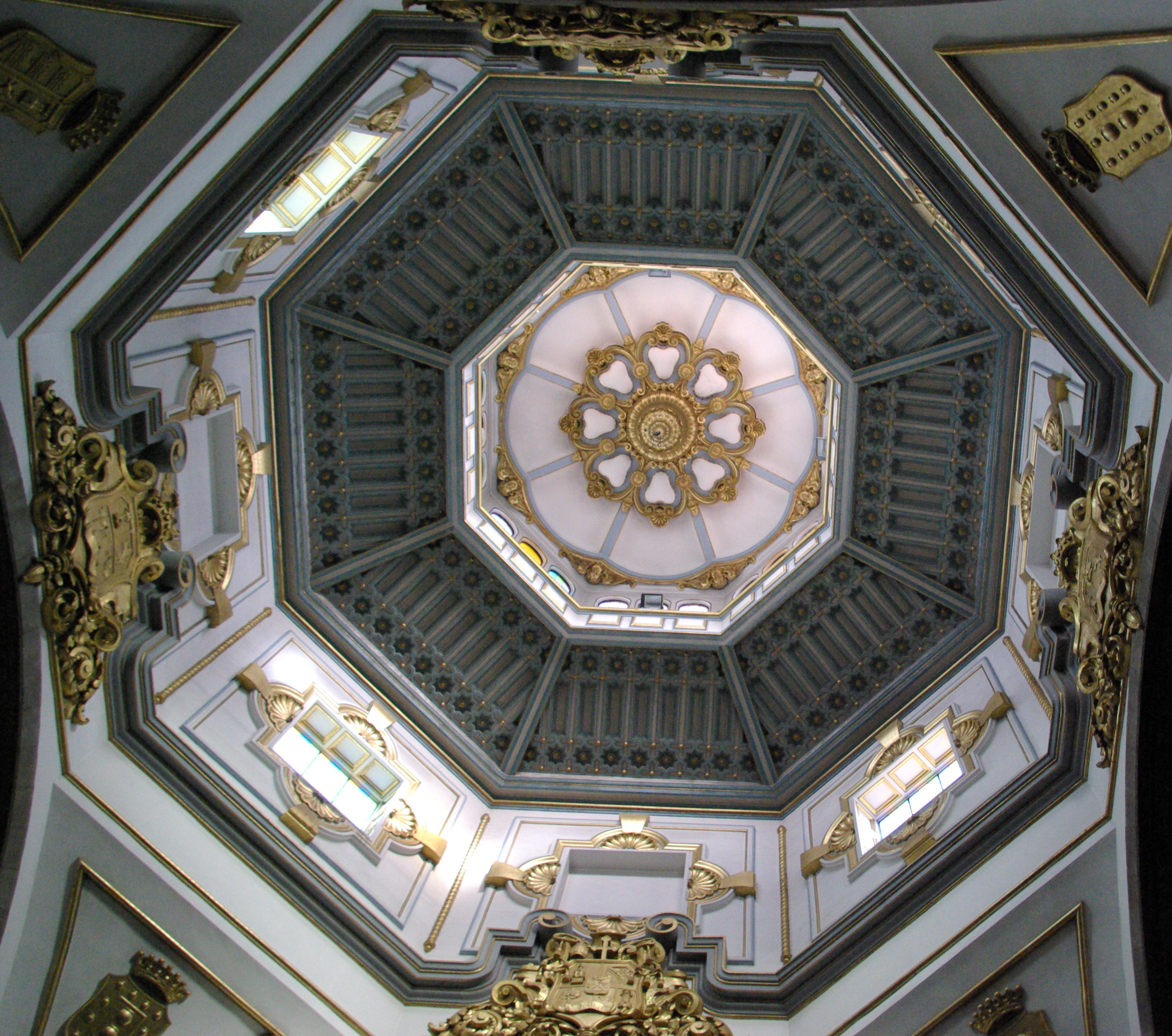
Basílica de Nuestra Señora de la Candelaria, Tenerife

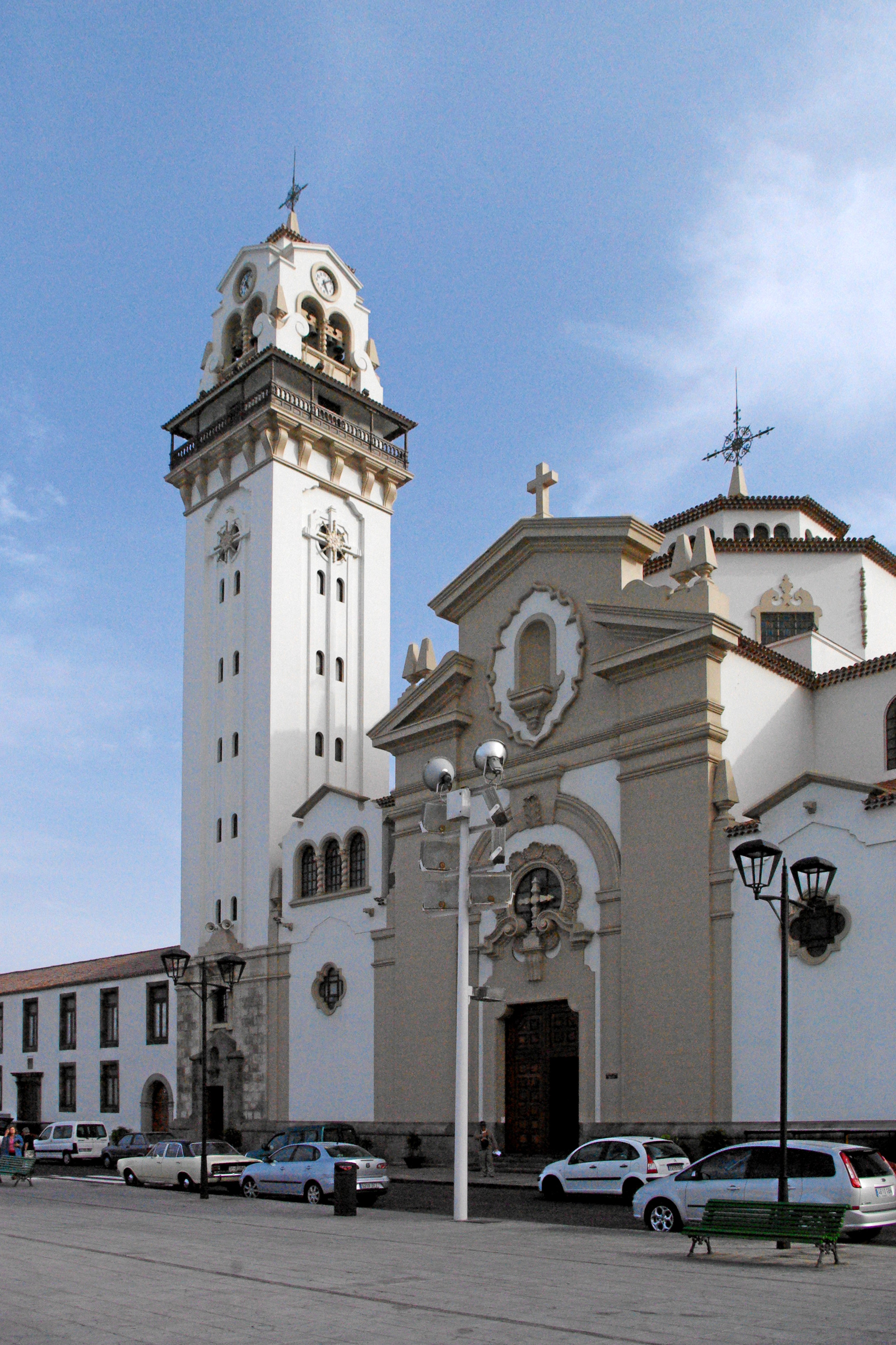
Basílica de Nuestra Señora de la Candelaria, Tenerife

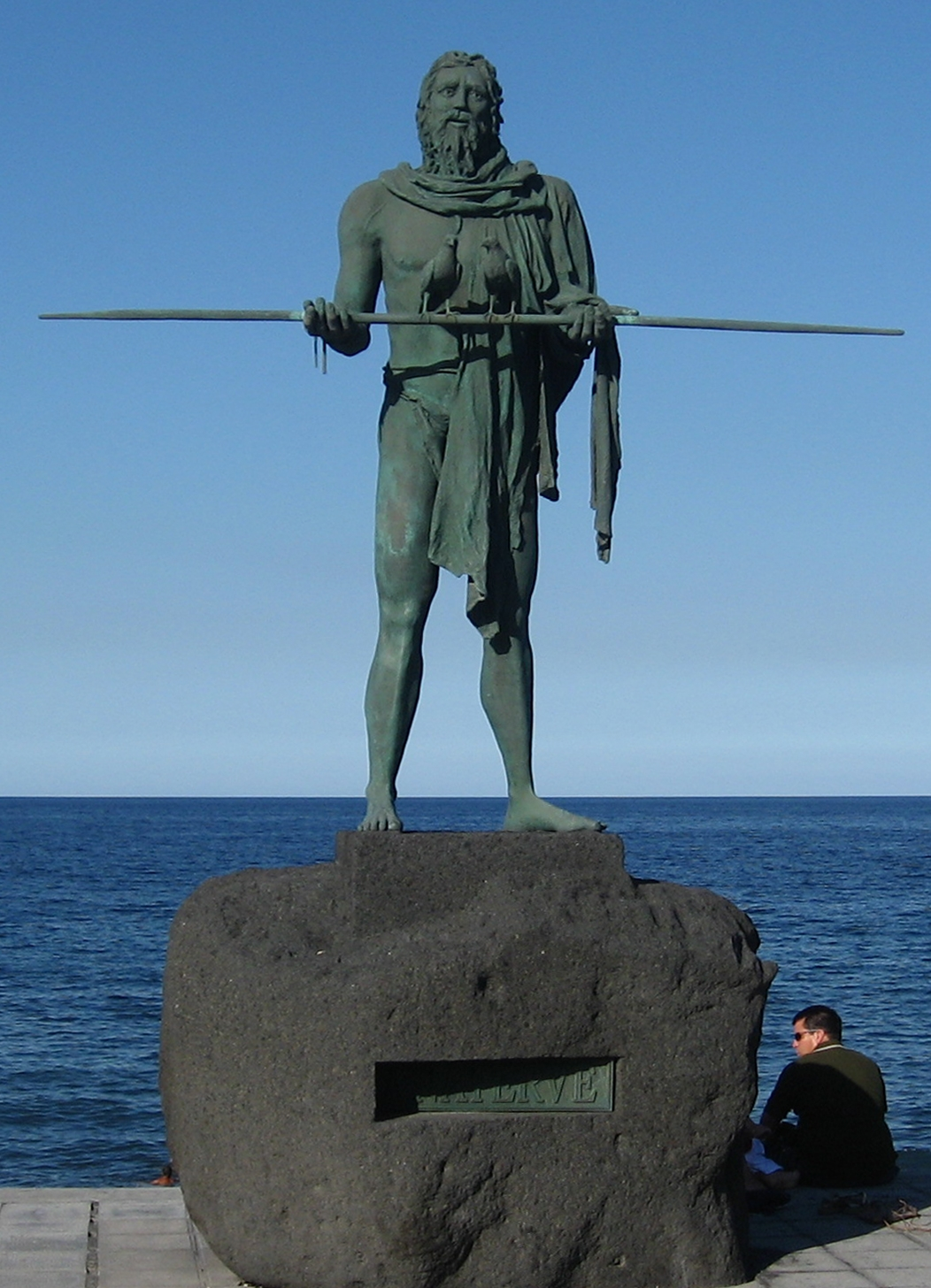
Statue of the Guanche mencey Añaterve. Candelaria, Tenerife

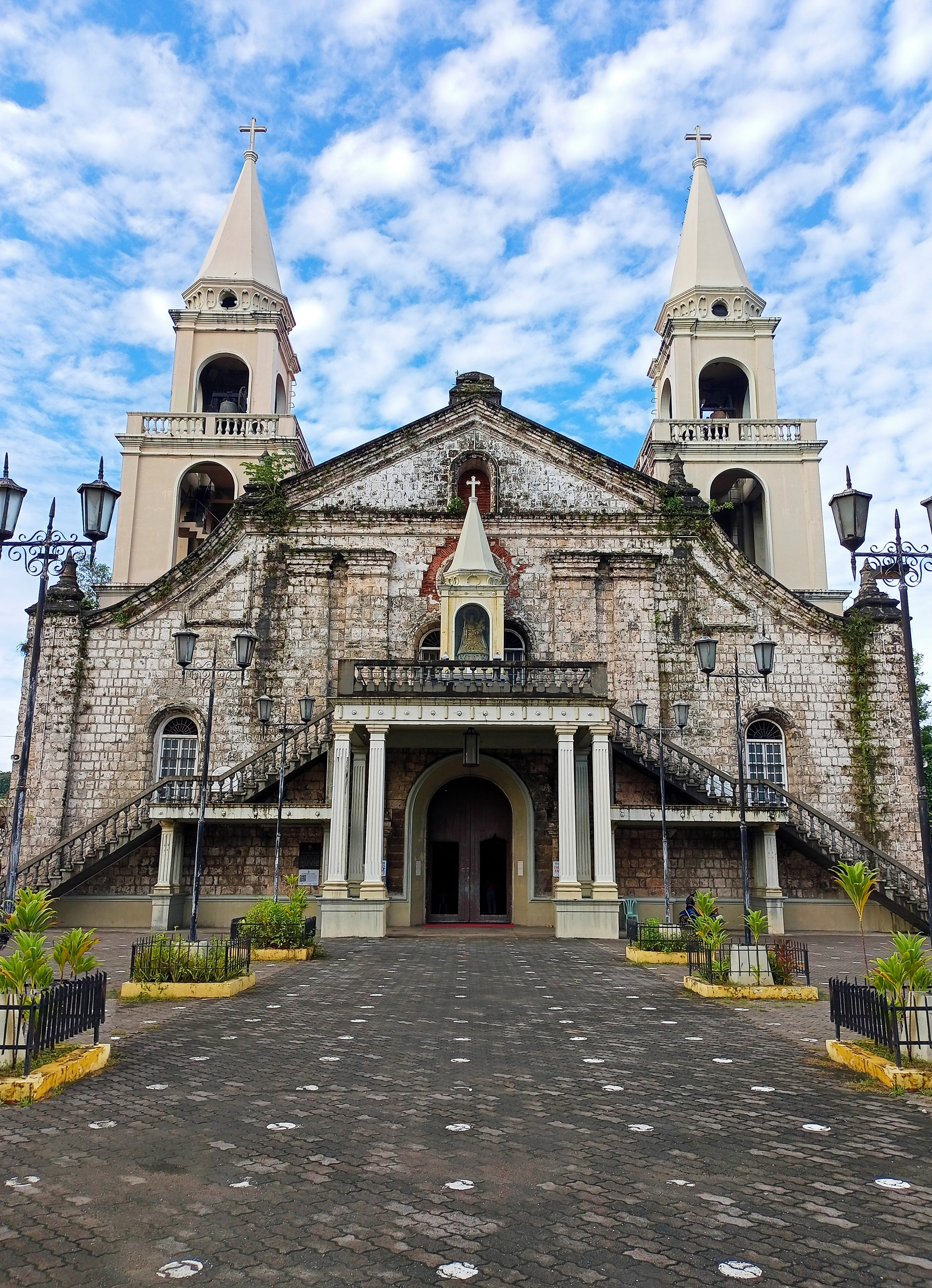
The Jaro Cathedral (National Shrine of Our Lady of Candles) in Jaro, Iloilo City, Philippines

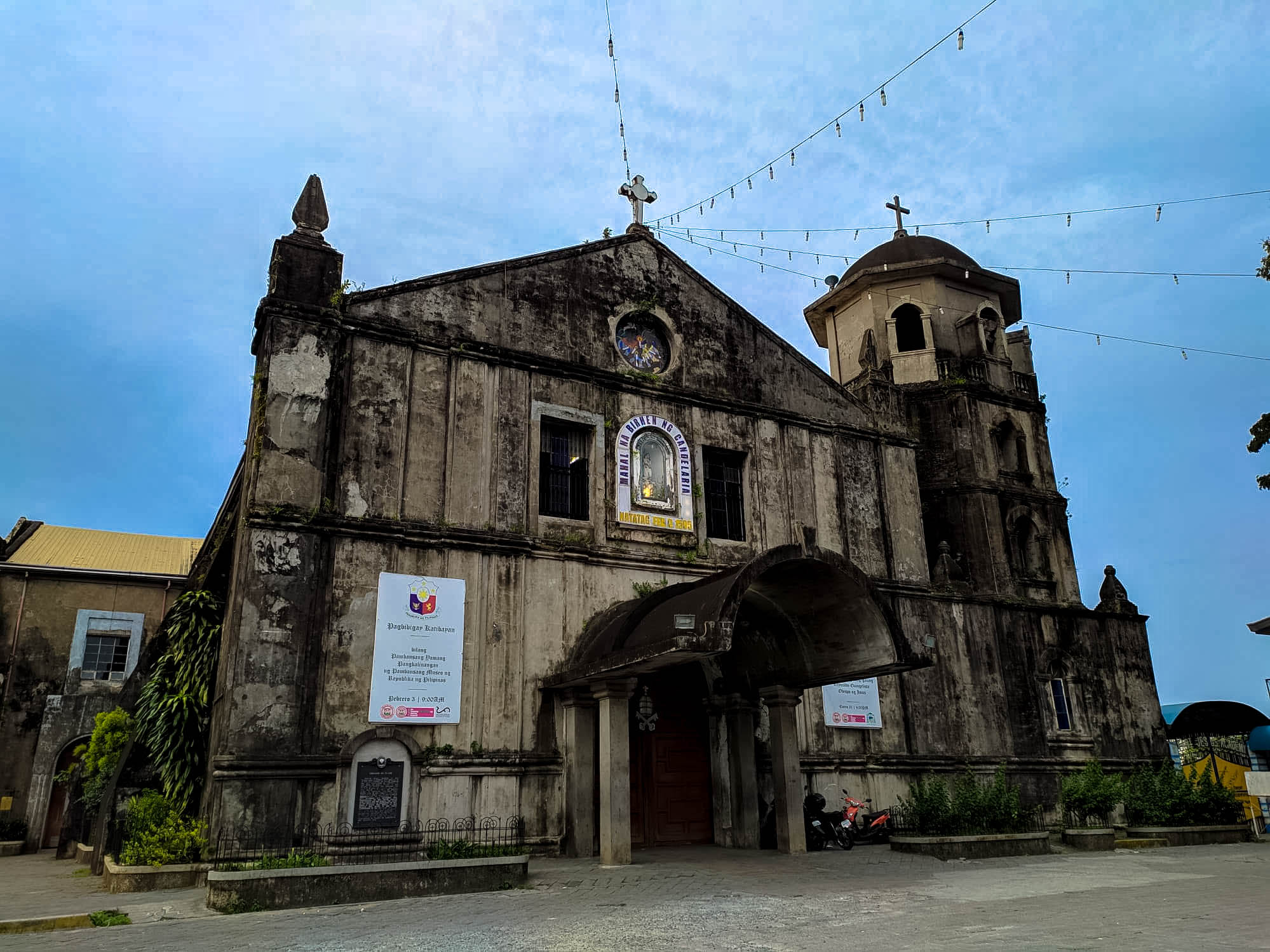
Diocesan Shrine of Our Lady of Candelaria in Silang, Cavite, Philippines

== See also ==
- Basilica of Candelaria
- Pilgrimage to Candelaria
- es:Virgen de la Candelaria (Islas Canarias) (Spanish Wikipedia)
- Cristo de La Laguna
- Basilica of Our Lady of Candelaria (Medellín, Colombia)
- Catedral de Nossa Senhora da Candelária (Bissau, Guinea-Bissau)
- Iglesia de la Candelaria
- Candelária Church (Rio de Janeiro, Brazil)
- Catedral Nuestra Señora de la Candelaria (Mayagüez, Puerto Rico)
- Iglesia de Nuestra Señora de la Candelaria y San Matías (Manatí, Puerto Rico)
- Our Lady of Candelaria of Chapi (Arequipa, Peru)
- Yemoja (Brazil, Uruguay)
