= Fasnia =

- Municipality
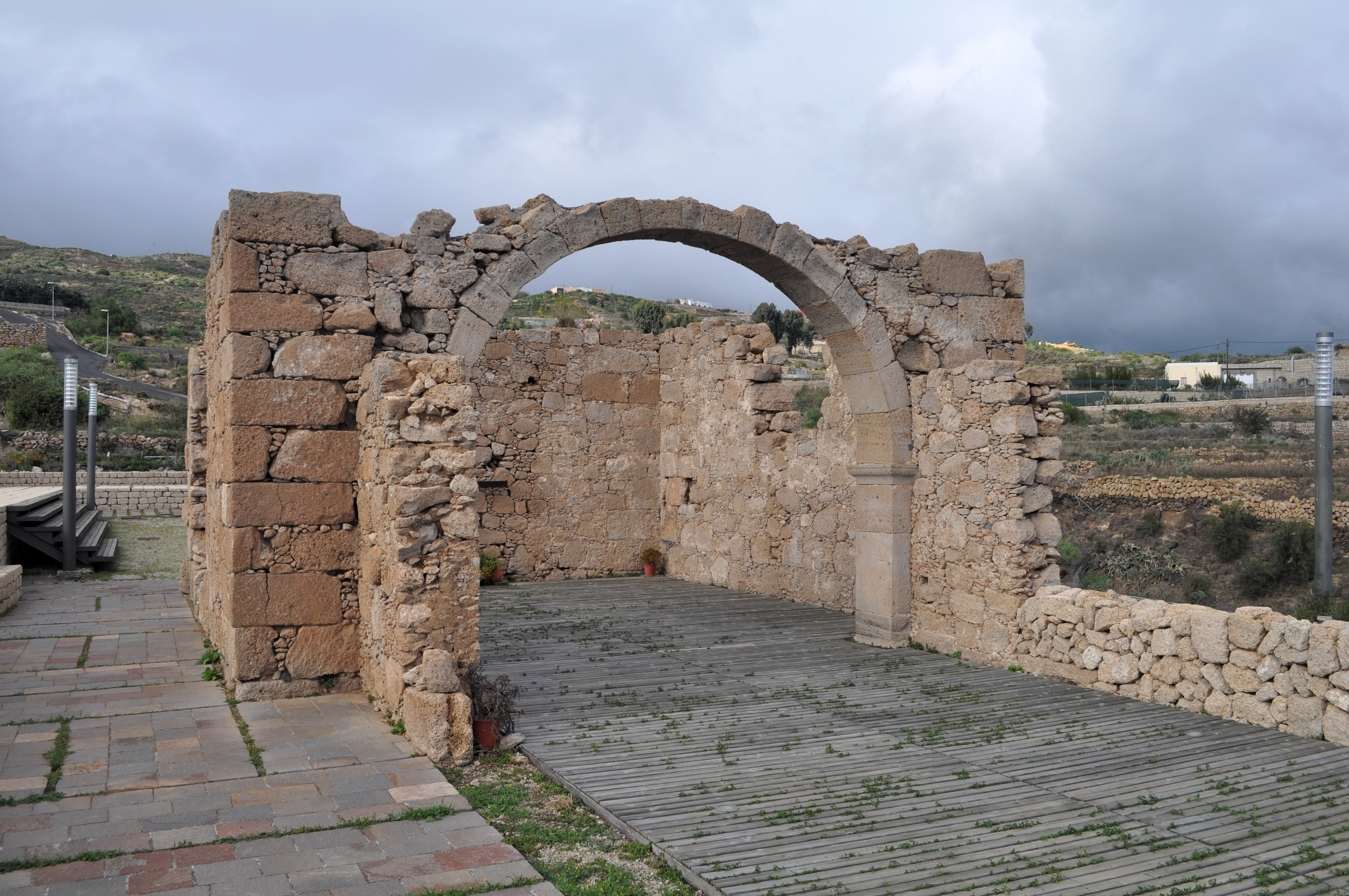
- Old church in Fasnia

- Flag Coat of arms

- Municipal location in Tenerife

- Location in the province of Santa Cruz de Tenerife Fasnia (Canary Islands) Fasnia (Spain, Canary Islands)
- Coordinates: 28°14′N 16°26′W
- Country: Spain
- Autonomous Region: Canary Islands
- Province: Santa Cruz de Tenerife
- Island: Tenerife

Area
  - Total: 45.11 km^{2} (17.42 sq mi)

Population (2025-01-01)
  - Total: 3,145
  - Density: 69.72/km^{2} (180.6/sq mi)
- Time zone: UTC+0 (GMT)
- Post Code: 38570
- Climate: Csa
- Website: www.fasnia.com

Fasnia is a town and a municipality in the eastern part of the Spanish island of Tenerife, one of the Canary Islands, and part of the province of Santa Cruz de Tenerife. The municipality extends for 45.1 square kilometers (17.4 sq mi) from the mountainous interior to the beaches on the Atlantic. Its population is 2,873 (2013). The TF-1 motorway passes through the municipality.

== Etymology ==
The name of the municipality comes from that of its administrative capital, being a term of Guanche origin that also appears in the historical documentation with the Fasnea variant.

As for its possible meaning, the historian Dominik Josef Wölfel relates it to the Berber word tafessena / tifesseniwin, 'step, rung of a ladder', an opinion that is also accepted by the philologist and historian Ignacio Reyes.

== Sites of interest ==
- Barranco de Fasnia y Güimar, a river gorge, and a natural monument.
