= Alonso de Espinosa =

XVI Century Spanish priest, chronicler and historian

Alonso de Espinosa (1543–c. 1600) was a Spanish priest and historian of the sixteenth century. He was the first official historian of the island of Tenerife.

== Biography ==
=== Early life and career ===
Little is known of his early life. He is first heard of towards the end of the sixteenth century in Guatemala where he had become a Dominican. It was while he was in Central America that he first heard of the reported miracles of Our Lady of Candelaria. This was an image of the Virgin and Child that had been among the Guanches of Tenerife since long before their conversion to Christianity, and had been venerated not only by the Guanches, but later by their conquerors, the Spanish. Inspired by the fame of this image, Espinosa soon found a member of the fraternity which had possession of it, and resolved to research and write a history of the image and its miracles. The result was his Guanches of Tenerife published in Seville in 1594.

Although the author's main purpose was to record the history of Our Lady of Candelaria, the work is also a rare account of the Guanches; he also gives a good account of the conquest and settlement of the Canary Islands by the Spanish.

=== The four books ===
He divides his work into four books:

- The first of which he describes the island of Tenerife, gives its early history, and an account of its inhabitants, their customs, food and dress, marriages, training for war, and mode of interment.
- The second book gives a detailed history of the image, from its mysterious appearance, on the east coast of the island, to Espinosa's own time.
- The third book is devoted to the invasion, conquest, and settlement of the island by the Spanish.
- The fourth and last book contains an enumeration of various cures and other alleged miracles performed by the image

A reprint of Espinosa's book appeared in Santa Cruz de Tenerife in 1848, as one of the Biblioteca Isleña series. A translation by Sir Clements Markham was published by the Hakluyt Society in London in 1907. The text also includes a brief vocabulary of the Guanche language, in addition to nine sentences.
