= El Rosario, Tenerife =

El Rosario
- Municipality
- Flag Coat of arms

- Municipal location in Tenerife

- Location in Tenerife El Rosario (Canary Islands) El Rosario (Spain, Canary Islands)
- Coordinates: 28°27′N 16°22′W
- Country: Spain
- Autonomous Region: Canary Islands
- Province: Santa Cruz de Tenerife
- Island: Tenerife

Area
  - Total: 39.43 km^{2} (15.22 sq mi)

Population (2025-01-01)
  - Total: 17,958
  - Density: 455.4/km^{2} (1,180/sq mi)
- Time zone: UTC+0 (GMT)
- Climate: Csb
- Website: www.ayuntamientoelrosario.org

El Rosario is a municipality in the northeastern part of the island of Tenerife in the Santa Cruz de Tenerife province, on the Canary Islands, Spain. The seat of the municipality is the town La Esperanza, in the mountainous interior of the island. The municipality includes the coastal town Radazul.

The population is 17,960 as of 2025, its area is 39.43 km^{2}.

== La Esperanza ==
The seat of the municipality, La Esperanza, sits at an elevation of 900 meters above sea level, with historic architecture of whitewashed houses with wooden balconies.

== Historical population ==
Year	Population
1991	8,103
1996	10,880
2001	13,462
2002	13,718
2003	14,862
2004	15,542
2005	16,024
2013	17,465
2025	17,960

== Education ==
The Deutsche Schule Santa Cruz de Tenerife, a German international school, is located in the Tabaita Alta section of El Rosario.

== See also ==
- List of municipalities in Santa Cruz de Tenerife
