= Sanctuary of the Santo Hermano Pedro =

Church building in Vilaflor, Spain

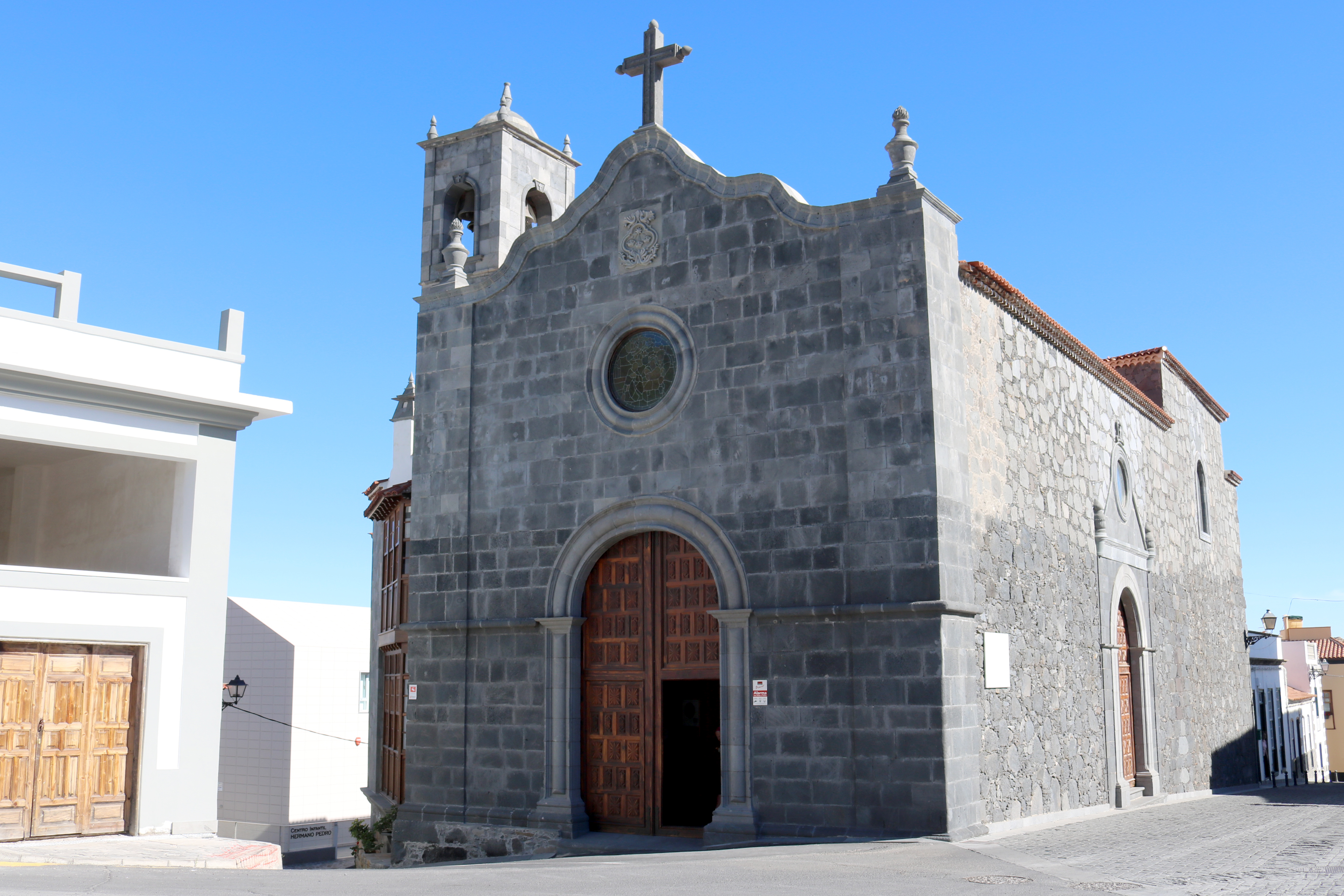
- Exterior of Sanctuary of the Santo Hermano Pedro in Vilaflor.

Religion
- Affiliation: Roman Catholic
- Diocese: Diocese of San Cristóbal de La Laguna
- Province: Archdiocese of Seville
- Ecclesiastical or organisational status: Sanctuary and conventual church
- Year consecrated: 2002

Location
- Location: Vilaflor, Spain.
- Interactive map of Sanctuary of the Santo Hermano Pedro
- Coordinates: 28°9′36.57″N 16°38′12.17″W

Architecture
- Direction of façade: North

The Sanctuary of the Santo Hermano Pedro is a pilgrimage temple located in the town of Vilaflor, south of the island of Tenerife (Canary Islands, Spain). The shrine is dedicated to Saint Peter of Saint Joseph Betancur, the first Saint of the Canary Islands.

== History ==
The Sanctuary was built on the place where the native house of Saint Peter of Betancur was originally situated. As the house was not preserved, in 1776 a branch of the Bethlehemites arrived on the site to initiate the construction of a temple in the exact same place of the Saint's birthplace. However, due to reforms in the 19th century Spanish political landscape, the temple was left unfinished.

In 1981, with the arrival of the Sisters Bethlehemites, the project regained momentum. Works officially resumed in 1991 and the Sanctuary was completed and inaugurated on April the 28th, 2002, when it was blessed by the Bishop of the Diocese of Tenerife, Felipe Fernández García.

== Features ==
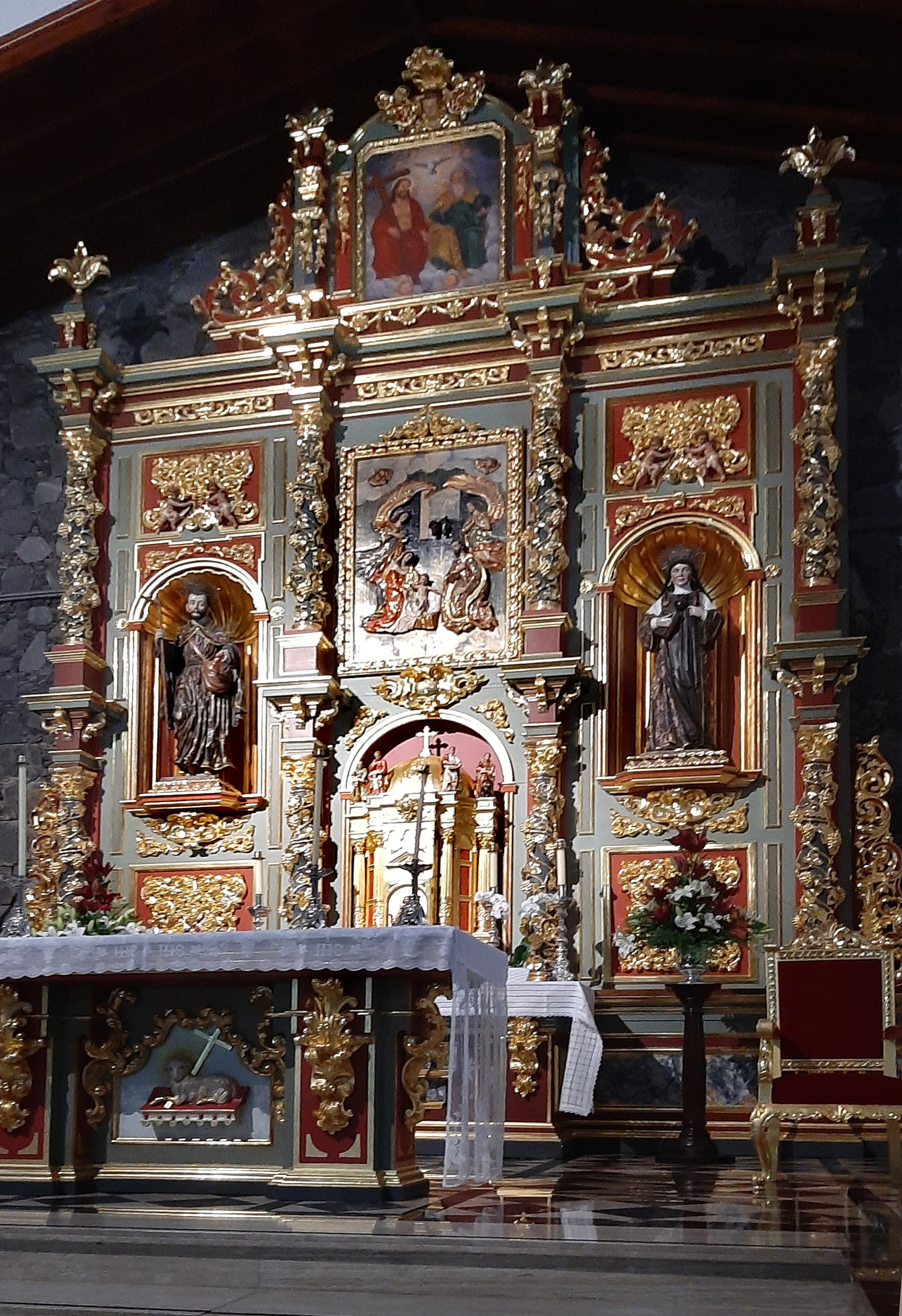
Altar of the church.

The temple hosts the relic of a vertebra of St. Peter de Betancur. It also features the same bell he used to summon the faithful. On the main altar there are images of Peter and Blessed María Encarnación Rosal, a reformer of the Order of the Bethlehemites Sisters. In the central part of the altarpiece there is a high relief of the scene of the Nativity of Jesus in Bethlehem, a central theme of Bethlehemite spirituality.

The temple has one single aisle and is attached to a convent run by the Sisters Betlemitas. It features a stone facade and is just behind the Parish of St. Peter the Apostle, in the town center.

From the nearby Church of Saint Peter starts the "Hermano Pedro's Way", a pastoral path which the Saint used to walk to move his flock over the region to the Cave of Santo Hermano Pedro. During the celebration of the Saint in April, hundreds of pilgrims travel the route. The event is of great religious and historical interest.

== See also ==
- Peter of Saint Joseph Betancur
- Bethlehemites
