= Religious congregation =

Type of Catholic religious institute

A religious congregation is a type of religious institute in the Catholic Church. They are legally distinguished from religious orders – the other major type of religious institute – in that members take simple vows, whereas members of religious orders take solemn vows.

== History ==
Until the 16th century, the vows taken in any of the religious orders approved by the Apostolic See were classified as solemn. This was declared by Pope Boniface VIII (1235–1303). According to this criterion, the last religious order founded was that of the Bethlehem Brothers in 1673.

By the constitution Inter cetera of 20 January 1521, Pope Leo X appointed a rule for tertiaries with simple vows. Under this rule, enclosure was optional, enabling non-enclosed followers of the rule to engage in various works of charity not allowed to enclosed religious. In 1566 and 1568, Pope Pius V rejected this class of institute, but they continued to exist and even increased in number. After at first being merely tolerated, they afterwards obtained approval. Their lives were oriented not to the ancient monastic way of life, but more to social service and to evangelization, both in Europe and in mission areas. Their number increased further in the upheavals brought by the French Revolution and subsequent Napoleonic invasions. They were reckoned as religious when Pope Leo XIII recognized as religious all men and women who took simple vows in such congregations.

The 1917 Code of Canon Law reserved the name "religious order" for institutes in which the vows were solemn, and used the term "religious congregation" or simply "congregation" for those with simple vows. The members of a religious order for men were called "regulars", those belonging to a religious congregation were simply "religious", a term that applied also to regulars. For women, those with simple vows were simply "sisters", with the term "nun" reserved in canon law for those who belonged to an institute of solemn vows, even if in some localities they were allowed to take simple vows instead.

However, it abolished the distinction according to which solemn vows, unlike simple vows, were indissoluble. It recognized no totally indispensable religious vows and thereby abrogated for the Latin Church the special consecration that distinguished orders from congregations, while keeping some juridical distinctions. Solemn vows were originally considered indissoluble. Not even the Pope could dispense from them. If for a just cause a solemnly professed religious was expelled, the vow of chastity remained unchanged and so rendered invalid any attempt at marriage, the vow of obedience obliged in relation, generally, to the bishop rather than to the religious superior, and the vow of poverty was modified to meet the new situation, but the expelled religious "could not, for example, will any goods to another; and goods which came to him reverted at his death to his institute or to the Holy See."

After publication of the 1917 Code, many institutes with simple vows appealed to the Holy See for permission to make solemn vows. The Apostolic Constitution Sponsa Christi of 21 November 1950 made access to that permission easier for nuns (in the strict sense), though not for religious institutes dedicated to apostolic activity. Many of these institutes of women then petitioned for the solemn vow of poverty alone. Towards the end of the Second Vatican Council, superiors general of clerical institutes and abbots president of monastic congregations were authorized to permit, for a just cause, their subjects of simple vows who made a reasonable request to renounce their property except for what would be required for their sustenance if they were to depart, thus assimilating their position to that of religious with solemn vows. These changes resulted in a blurring of the previously clear distinction between "orders" and "congregations", since institutes that were founded as "congregations" began to have some members who had all three solemn vows or had members that took a solemn vow of poverty and simple vows of chastity and obedience.

== Current juridical status ==
The 1983 Code of Canon Law maintains the distinction between solemn and simple vows, but no longer makes any distinction between their juridical effects, including the distinction between orders and congregations. It uses the single term religious institute to designate all such institutes of consecrated life alike. The word congregation (Latin: congregation) is instead used to refer to congregations of the Roman Curia or monastic congregations.

The Annuario Pontificio lists for both men and women the institutes of consecrated life that are of pontifical right, namely those that the Holy See has erected or approved by formal decree. For the men, it gives what it calls the "Historical-Juridical List of Precedence". This list maintains to a large extent the distinction between orders and congregations, detailing 96 clerical religious congregations and 34 lay religious congregations. However, it does not distinguish between orders and congregations of Eastern Catholic Churches or female religious institutes.

== See also ==
- Secular institute
- Society of apostolic life
- List of religious institutes
