= Peter of Saint Joseph de Betancur =

Christian saint

Saint Peter of Saint Joseph de Betancur y Gonzáles O.F.B.
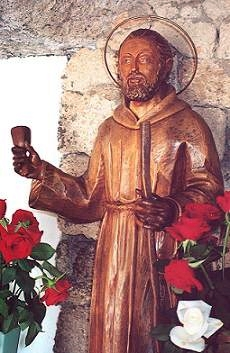
- Statue of St. Peter of St. Joseph in the Cave of Santo Hermano Pedro, Tenerife, Spain.

Religious and missionary
- Born: 21 March 1626; Vilaflor, Tenerife, Spanish Empire
- Died: 25 April 1667 (aged 41); Antigua Guatemala, Captaincy General of Guatemala, Spanish Empire
- Venerated in: Roman Catholic Church (Canary Islands & Guatemala)
- Beatified: June 22, 1980, St. Peter's Basilica, Vatican City by Pope John Paul II
- Canonized: July 30, 2002, Guatemala City, Guatemala by Pope John Paul II
- Major shrine: Cave of Santo Hermano Pedro and Sanctuary of the Santo Hermano Pedro (Tenerife) and San Francisco Church in Antigua, Guatemala
- Feast: April 25
- Attributes: Holds a walking stick and bell. Occasionally it also represents a spear canary pastor.
- Patronage: Canary Islands, Guatemala, Central America, catechists of Guatemala, Honorary Mayor of municipalities in the south of Tenerife and Honorary Mayor of Antigua Guatemala, of the homeless and of those who serve the sick.

Peter of Saint Joseph de Betancur (or Betancourt) y Gonzáles, OFB (Spanish: Pedro de San José de Betancur y Gonzáles, 21 March 1626– 25 April 1667), also called Hermano Pedro de San José Betancurt (Brother Peter of Saint Joseph Betancur) or more simply Peter de Betancurt, Hermano Pedro (Brother Peter), Santo Hermano Pedro (Saint Brother Peter), or San Pedro de Vilaflor (Saint Peter of Vilaflor), was a Spanish saint and missionary in Guatemala.

Known as the "Saint Francis of Assisi of the Americas", he is the first saint native to the Canary Islands. He left at the age of 23 for New Spain, and is considered the first saint of Guatemala and Central America for having done his missionary work in those American lands. He was the founder of Order of Our Lady of Bethlehem.

== Biography ==
Betancourt was born at Vilaflor on the Island of Tenerife in 1626, one of the five children of Amador Betancourt, a descendant of Jean de Béthencourt, the French knight and explorer who conquered the Canary Islands for King Henry III of Castile (1402-1405), and of Ana Gonzáles Betancurt. In the 21st century it was learned that he had indigenous Guanche ancestry as well.

As a small child, he worked as a shepherd, caring for his family's small flock, their only source of income. He also prayed in a small cave near the present-day town of El Médano (municipality of Granadilla de Abona). When the father's estate was seized in 1638 by a moneylender for failure to pay debt, Betancourt was indentured to the man's service. During this period, his eldest brother, Mateo, migrated to Spain's colonies in the New World, possibly settling in Ecuador.

There are anecdotes about Betancourt's life in Tenerife, such as his practice of staying in a cave in El Médano in the south of the island. He used it as a seasonal winter refuge with his cattle, a place of prayer, and a shelter from pirates, who frequently raided the Canary Islands coast.

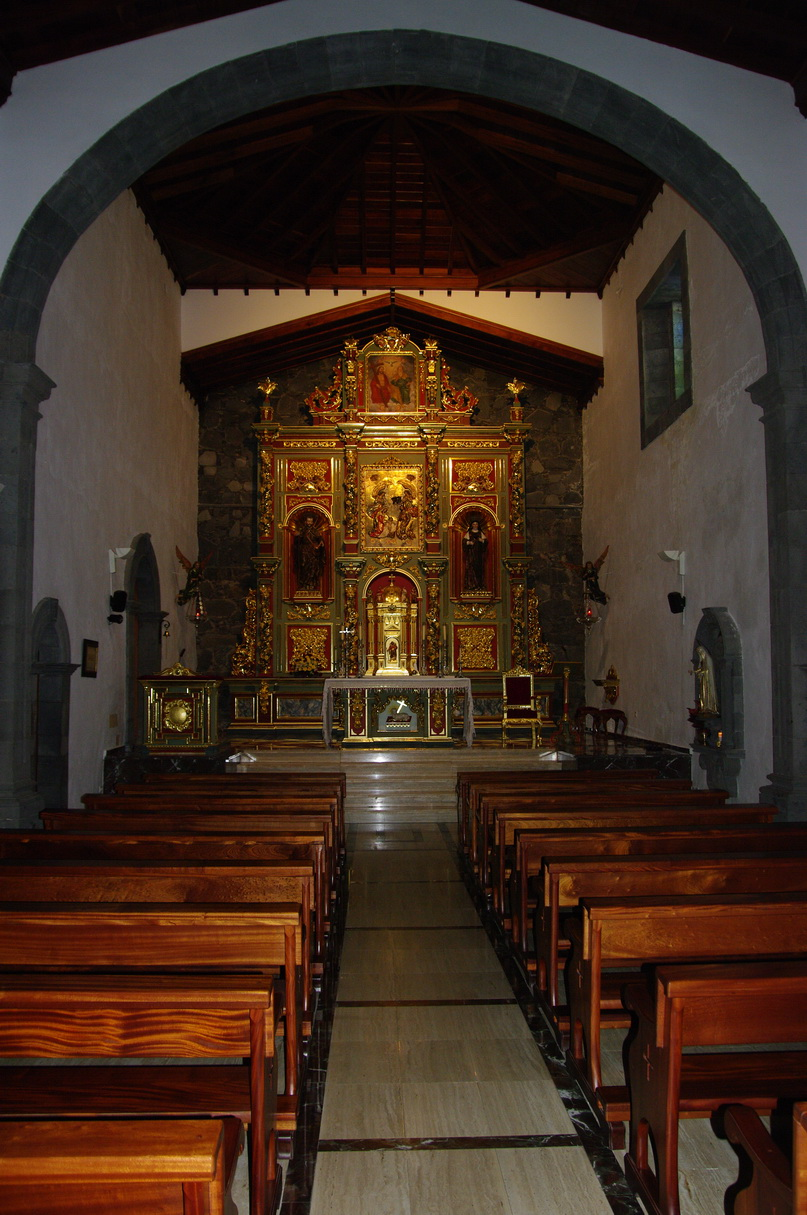
Interior of Sanctuary of the Santo Hermano Pedro in Vilaflor, Tenerife.

In 1649, at age 23, Betancourt was freed from his period of indenture and decided to follow his brother to New Spain. He sailed to Guatemala, the capital of the Kingdom of Guatemala, in hopes of connecting with a relative engaged in government service.

== To New Spain ==
He left from the port of Santa Cruz de Tenerife. It is believed that Pedro, before leaving, prayed in the Church of San Francisco de Asís in Santa Cruz de Tenerife, because this was the church of the port and was popular among those who leaving for the New World.

By the time he reached Havana, Cuba, he was out of money. He spent a year serving a priest there who was also from Tenerife. From that point, Pedro worked on a ship that docked at Honduras, from where he walked to La Antigua Guatemala. When he arrived, he was so impoverished that he joined the bread line run by the Franciscan friars to feed the poor. He eventually found his uncle, who helped him get a job in a local textile factory.

In 1653 Betancourt enrolled in the Jesuit College of San Borgia to study for priesthood. When after three years he could not master the material, he withdrew from the school and abandoned this idea. After holding the position of sacristan in a church dedicated to the Blessed Virgin, he rented a house in a suburb of Calvary city. There he taught reading and catechism to poor children.

Unable to receive holy orders, Betancourt became a Franciscan tertiary at the Franciscan friary of Costa Rica in Antigua Guatemala. He adopted the religious name of Peter of Saint Joseph. He visited hospitals, jails, and the unemployed, and worked with the young.

In 1658 Betancourt was given a hut which he converted into a hospital for the poor who had been discharged from the city hospital but still needed to mend. His zeal elicited benefactions from those around him, and the bishop and governor supplied him with all the conveniences he required.

Three years later several individuals provided for the purchase of the houses surrounding the one Betancourt occupied. A larger hospital was erected on this area. Betancourt also worked directly with the masons. Patrons thoroughly equipped and stocked the hospital.

This institution for the convalescent poor, was placed under the patronage of Our Lady of Bethlehem. Soon after a shelter was developed for the homeless, a school for the poor, an oratory, and an inn for priests.

== The Bethlehemites ==
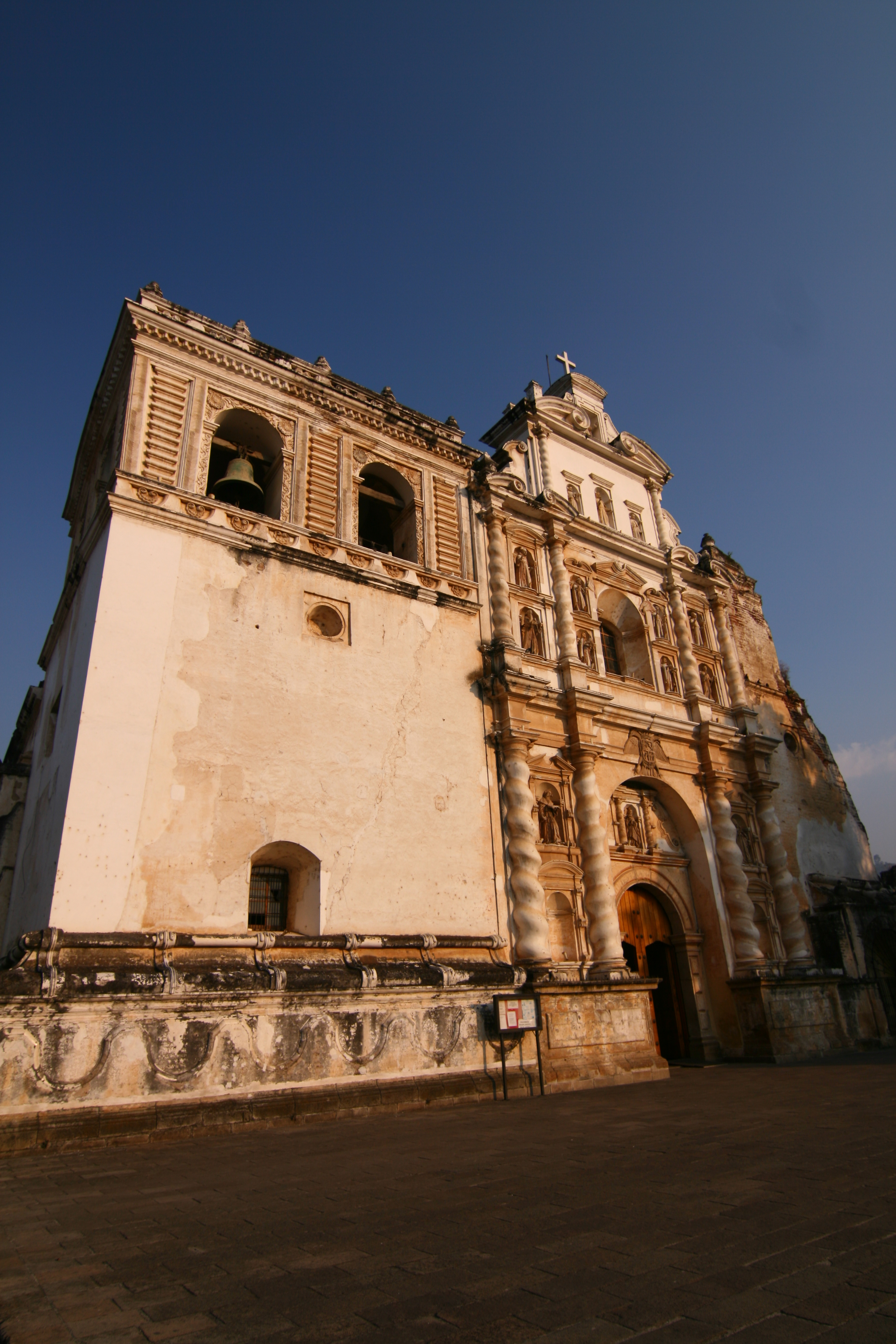
Church of San Francisco in La Antigua Guatemala.

Betancourt was joined by other tertiaries. He personally trained his first assistants and had no wish to organize a community, but simply to establish his hospital. Soon, however, he wrote up an adaptation of the Rule of St. Augustine (although Betancourt was a Franciscan) for the community. The women who were involved in teaching the children also adopted this rule. This led to the formation of the Order of Our Lady of Bethlehem (Spanish: Orden de Nuestra Señora de Belén), or Bethlemitas, who tend to the sick. The men and women who joined his religious community also served in the two other hospitals of the city, and Betancourt continued to befriend poor children. The Bethlemite Order belongs to the Franciscan community.

== Later years ==
Betancourt also extended his compassion to prisoners. Every Thursday he begged for them through the city and visited them in their cells. He begged for alms to endow the Masses celebrated by poor priests, and also endowed Masses to be celebrated in the early hours so that the poor might not miss Mass for having to go to work. He would travel the streets at night ringing a bell and recommending that souls in purgatory be prayed for.

Betancourt died on 25 April 1667, at the age of forty-one, in Antigua Guatemala. He was said to be exhausted by labour and penance. At the request of the Capuchin Friars, he was buried in their church. For a long time, his remains there were held in veneration.

Betancourt devoted his life to helping those marginalized: lepers, prisoners, slaves and Indians and served as precursor of Human Rights.

== Veneration ==
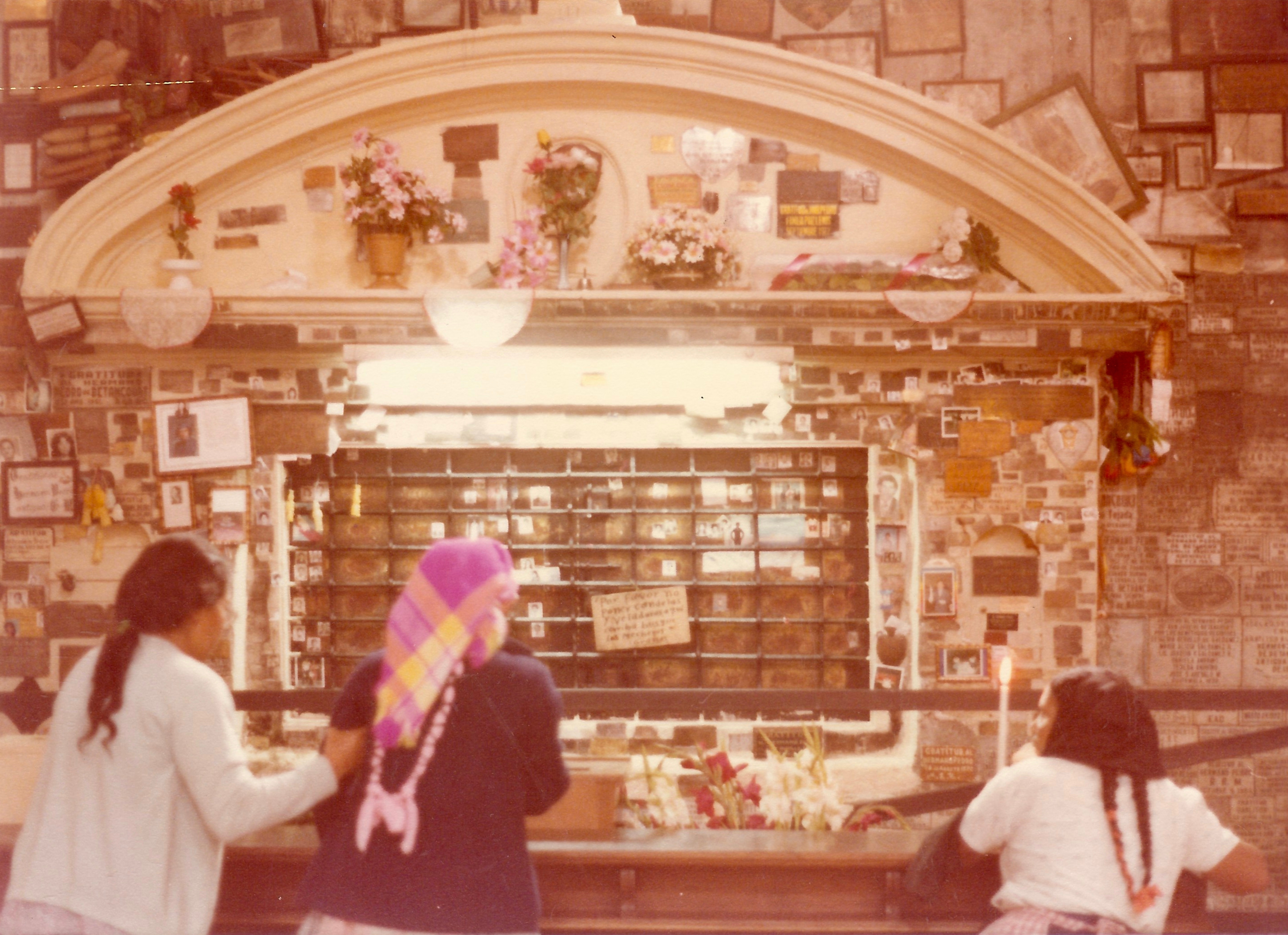
Veneration at the tomb of Hermano Pedro in Antigua Guatemala, 1979.

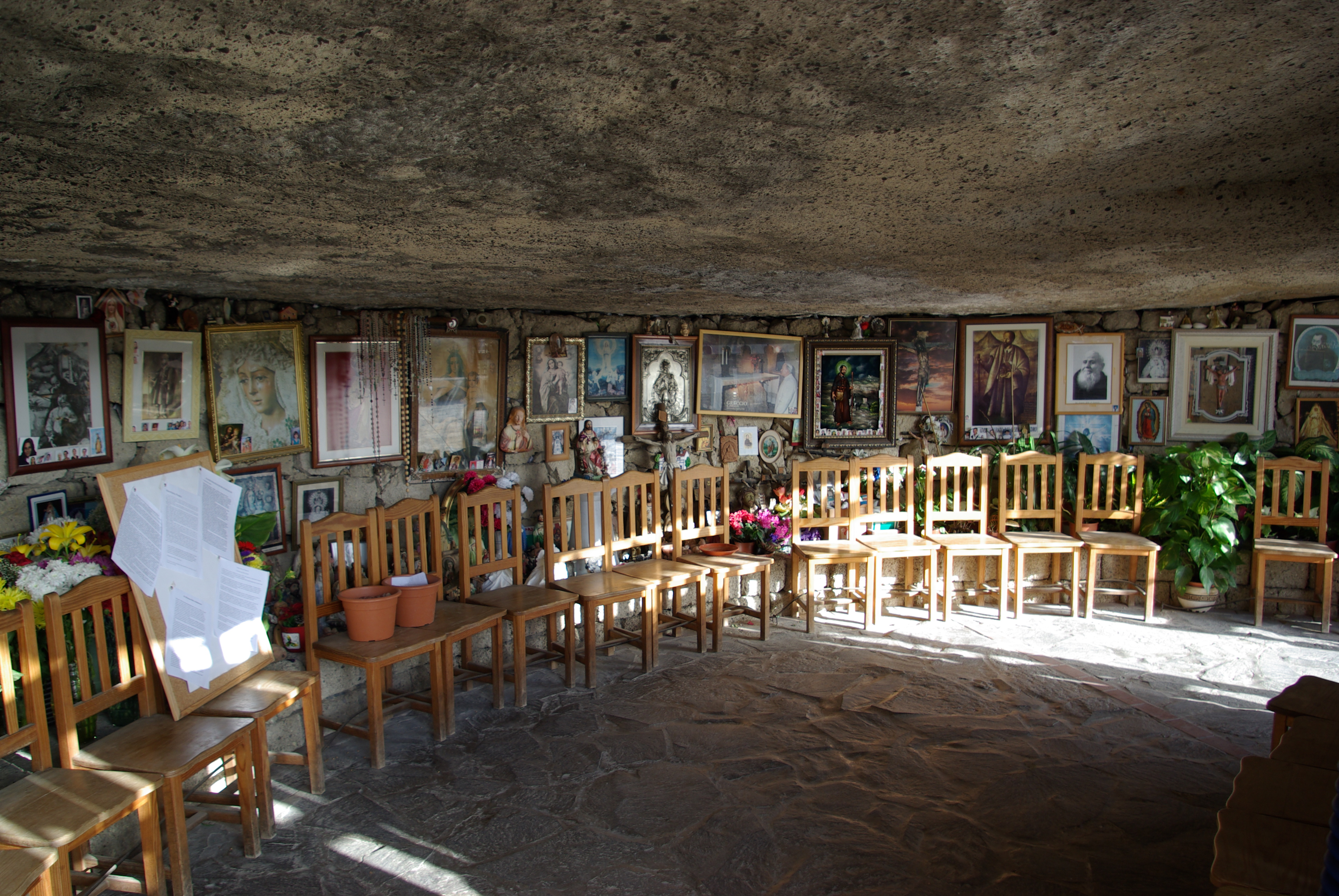
Cave of Santo Hermano Pedro (Tenerife).

Betancourt's cause was formally opened on 6 August 1729, granting him the title of Servant of God. He was declared Venerable on 15 July 1771, and beatified on 22 June 1980.

The healing of a child with an intestinal lymphoma was taken by the Catholic Church as the miracle required for his canonization. This child was a native of Betancourt's birthplace, Vilaflor.

Betancourt was canonized on 30 July 2002 by Pope John Paul II. At the homily read by Pope John Paul in Guatemala City on 30 July 2002, Betancourt was called the "first Tenerifean and Guatemalan saint", and he "... personifies "a heritage which must not be lost; we should always be thankful for it and we should renew our resolve to imitate it". John Paul II praised Betancourt for his humble spirit and austere life.

Betancourt's tomb is in the San Francisco Church in Antigua Guatemala. The Cave of Santo Hermano Pedro is located in the south of the island of Tenerife, in a desert on the outskirts of the city of El Médano. It is a very popular pilgrimage site, where the faithful present votive offerings to Betancourt. Inside the cave is a wooden statue of Betancourt. Also an important place of veneration is the Sanctuary of the Santo Hermano Pedro, which is built on his birthplace in Vilaflor.

His liturgical holiday is 25 April, although it is usually moved to 24, because the 25 is celebrated to Mark the Evangelist. Apart from the April holiday, in Tenerife Pedro de San José de Betancur y Gonzáles is also celebrated on 29 June, coinciding with the feast of Peter the Apostle.

In his message to migrants sheltered at the Las Raíces center in Tenerife during his 2026 apostolic journey to Spain, Pope Leo XIV reminded them of the two Canarian saints, Pedro de Betancur and José de Anchieta, as two migrants who embarked on an unknown journey to proclaim the Gospel in the Americas, knowing how to give what they had and also embrace the new experiences offered to them. This apostolic visit also coincided with the 400th anniversary of the birth of Saint Pedro de Betancur. During the Pope's farewell Mass in Santa Cruz de Tenerife, relics of both saints were displayed on the altar.

== Santo Hermano Pedro and the Canarian identity ==
The figure of Saint Peter of Betancur has been considered an identity symbol of Canarian culture. The Saint Peter appears in many stories of oral tradition, especially those linked to his pastoral and mystical activity in his cave located in the Chasna region in the south of Tenerife. These traditions have been given new layers of meaning over time and at the same time have been linked to the Canarian identity. The symbolic resonance of the figure of Saint Peter of Betancur is complex and multifaceted, and extends from being one of the most universal figures of the Canary Islands, and to his status as the first native saint of the archipelago.

In some representations, the saint is symbolically synonymous with the Canarian religious culture itself, together with the Virgin of Candelaria, patron saint of the archipelago. In fact, among the canonized saints, Saint Peter of Betancur is the one usually used to represent the entire Canary archipelago. This has caused him to be proposed in recent times by different political and religious authorities as a co-patron or secondary patron of the Canary Islands.

The identification of the saint with the aboriginal past of the Canary archipelago also contributes to all this, as he himself is a descendant of the original aboriginal people and his connection to various activities typical of the Guanche people, such as transhumance from coast to summit. Among the iconographic elements What defines it in the Catholic saints is the Canarian shepherd's spear, which also has its origin in the aboriginal people of the islands. All these elements, among others, have made the figure of San Pedro de Betancur one of the main symbols of Canarian religious and cultural identity.

== Legacy ==
Betancourt is considered the Apostle of Guatemala. He accomplished important social work serving the most vulnerable and needy. It is considered comparable to that of Mother Teresa centuries later in Kolkata, India.

He is sometimes credited with introducing to the Americas, the Christmas Eve posadas procession, in which people representing Mary and Joseph seek a night's lodging from their neighbors. The custom spread to Mexico and other Central American countries.

Among other facets of his life, he was known for his defense of the Immaculate Conception, two centuries before it was declared as dogma, his devotion to the souls of Purgatory, and his penances.

The historian David Vela, biographer of the saint, attributes to him the titles of "doctor in humility" and "wise in mercy". He is also known as "the man who was charity".

Currently, a pilgrimage is carried out in Tenerife, the Hermano Pedro's Way, which remembers the route that the saint took in his youth.

== See also ==
- Bethlehemite Brothers
- List of saints of the Canary Islands
