= Bethlehemites (disambiguation) =

Bethlehemites, or Bethlemites is the name of five Catholic religious orders.

It may also refer to:

- Inhabitants of Bethlehem
- Hussites of Bohemia are sometimes called "Bethlehemites"
- Inmates of Bethlem Royal Hospital or, colloquially, of madmen in general
