= Fuentealta =

Brand of bottled water from Tenerife in the Canary Islands

- Industry: Bottled Water
- Founded: 1975; 51 years ago
- Headquarters: Santa Cruz de Tenerife, Islas Canarias
- Parent: Compañía de las Islas Occidentales
- Website: http://www.fuente-alta.com

Fuentealta is a bottled water brand from the island of Tenerife in the Canary Islands. The company belongs to Grupo de las Islas Occidentales, a Spanish holding company.

The company Aguas de Vilaflor, SA. (AVISA) was created in 1975 as a water bottling plant and is located in the municipality of Vilaflor, which is the highest town in the Canary Islands at 1400m above sea level. The natural springs Fuente Alta (high fountain), which is in a protected nature reserve since the waters that fill the spring come directly from the Teide National Park, which in 2007 was named by UNESCO as a World Heritage Site, thanks to the Spanish volcanologist, Juan Carlos Carracedo.

== Composition ==
| Parámetros | Resultados mg/L |
|---|---|
| Residuo Seco a 180 °C | 379 |
| Bicarbonato | 305 |
| Sulfato | 1,75 |
| Cloruro | 5,03 |
| Nitrato | 9,80 |
| Fluoruro | 0,48 |
| Calcio | 29,4 |
| Magnesio | 14,8 |
| Sodio | 59,5 |
| Potasio | 9,97 |
