= Granadilla de Abona =

- Municipality
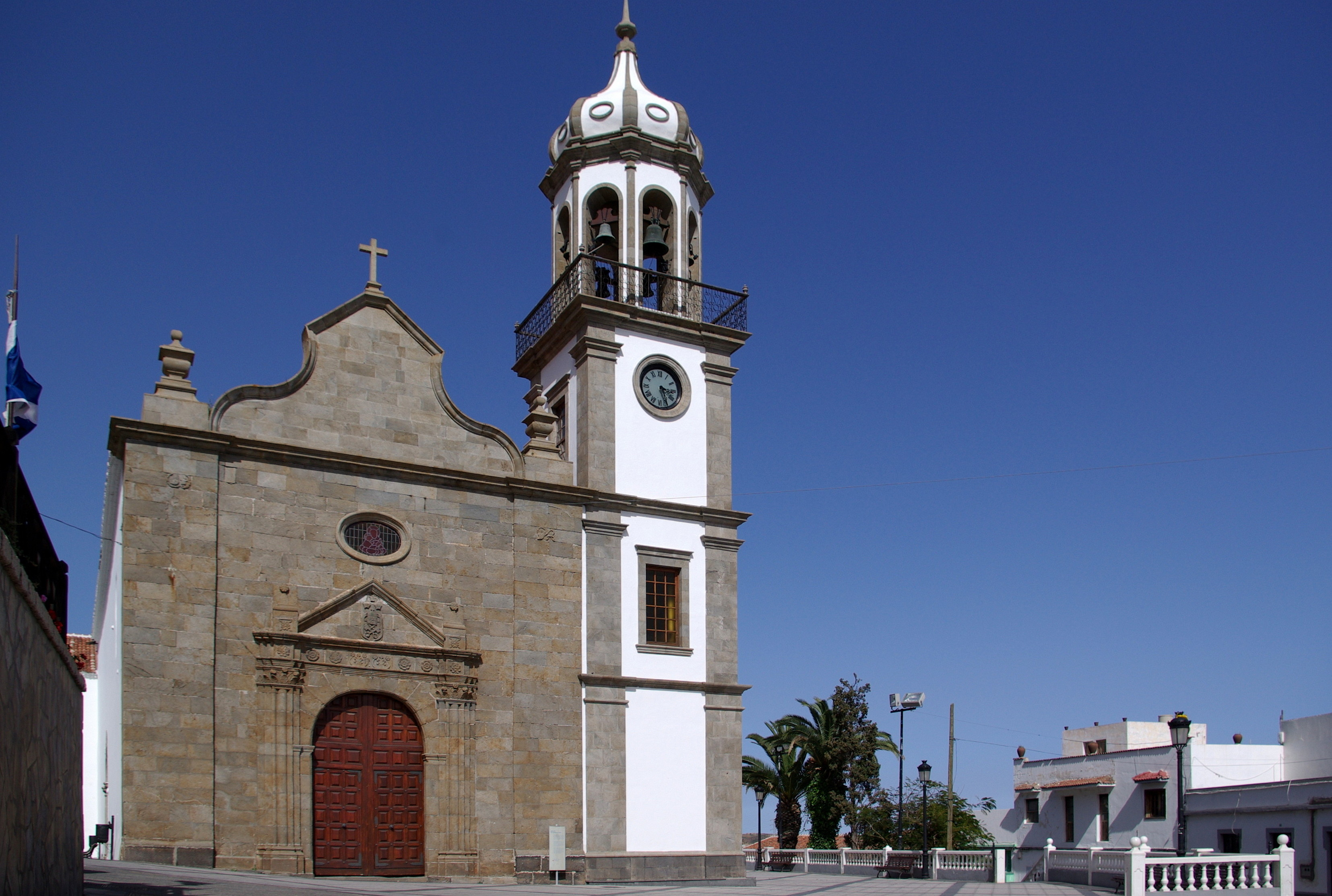
- San Antonio de Padua Church

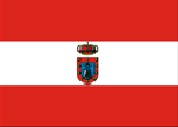
- Flag Coat of arms

- Municipal location in Tenerife

- Location in Tenerife Granadilla de Abona (Canary Islands) Granadilla de Abona (Spain, Canary Islands)
- Coordinates: 28°7′0″N 16°34′0″W
- Country: Spain
- Autonomous Community: Canary Islands
- Province: Santa Cruz de Tenerife
- Island: Tenerife

Government
  - Mayor: José Domingo Regalado (CC)

Area
  - Total: 162.4 km^{2} (62.7 sq mi)
- Elevation (AMSL): 650 m (2,130 ft)

Population (2025-01-01)
  - Total: 58,752
  - Density: 361.8/km^{2} (937.0/sq mi)
- Time zone: UTC+0 (CET)
  - Summer (DST): UTC+1 (CEST (GMT +1))
- Postal code: 38600
- Area code: +34 (Spain) + 922 (Tenerife)
- Climate: Csb
- Website: Town Hall

Granadilla de Abona is a municipality in the south of Tenerife (Canary Islands, Spain), covering an area of about 155 km^{2} (60 sq mi). According to the latest official data from 2025, it has a population of 58,752. The population has grown significantly in recent decades, driven by both internal migration within Spain and immigrants from Latin America and other regions.

The municipality extends from the altitudinous center of the island - Mount Guajara (2,718 m, the third-highest mountain on the island, after Teide and Pico Viejo) is situated in this municipality - to the Atlantic Ocean.

Reina Sofía Airport is located in this municipality, as well as the beachside town of El Médano ("The Sand Dune"), where many important windsurfing competitions are held. La Montaña Roja ("The Red Mountain"), a volcanic cone located in El Médano, is a protected natural preserve, along with five other "espacios naturales," which comprise 25% of the municipality's total area. Plans to build an industrial and commercial port in this municipality along a 5-kilometer (3.1 mi) sector along the coast, from Barranco del Río to Montaña Pelada, have been discussed but not implemented, due to concerns about the environmental damage such a development would cause (All objections have been cleared and port goes ahead). There is a wind farm in this municipality as well.

== Communities ==
The municipality's main town is Granadilla de Abona; other towns include San Isidro, El Cabezo, Castro, Los Abrigos, Charco del Pino, El Médano, Montaña de Yaco, El Salto, and Los Llanos.

== Historical population ==
Year	Population
1991	16,884
1996	18,508
2001	21,135
2002	27,224
2003	28,927
2004	30,769
2013	43,608

== History ==
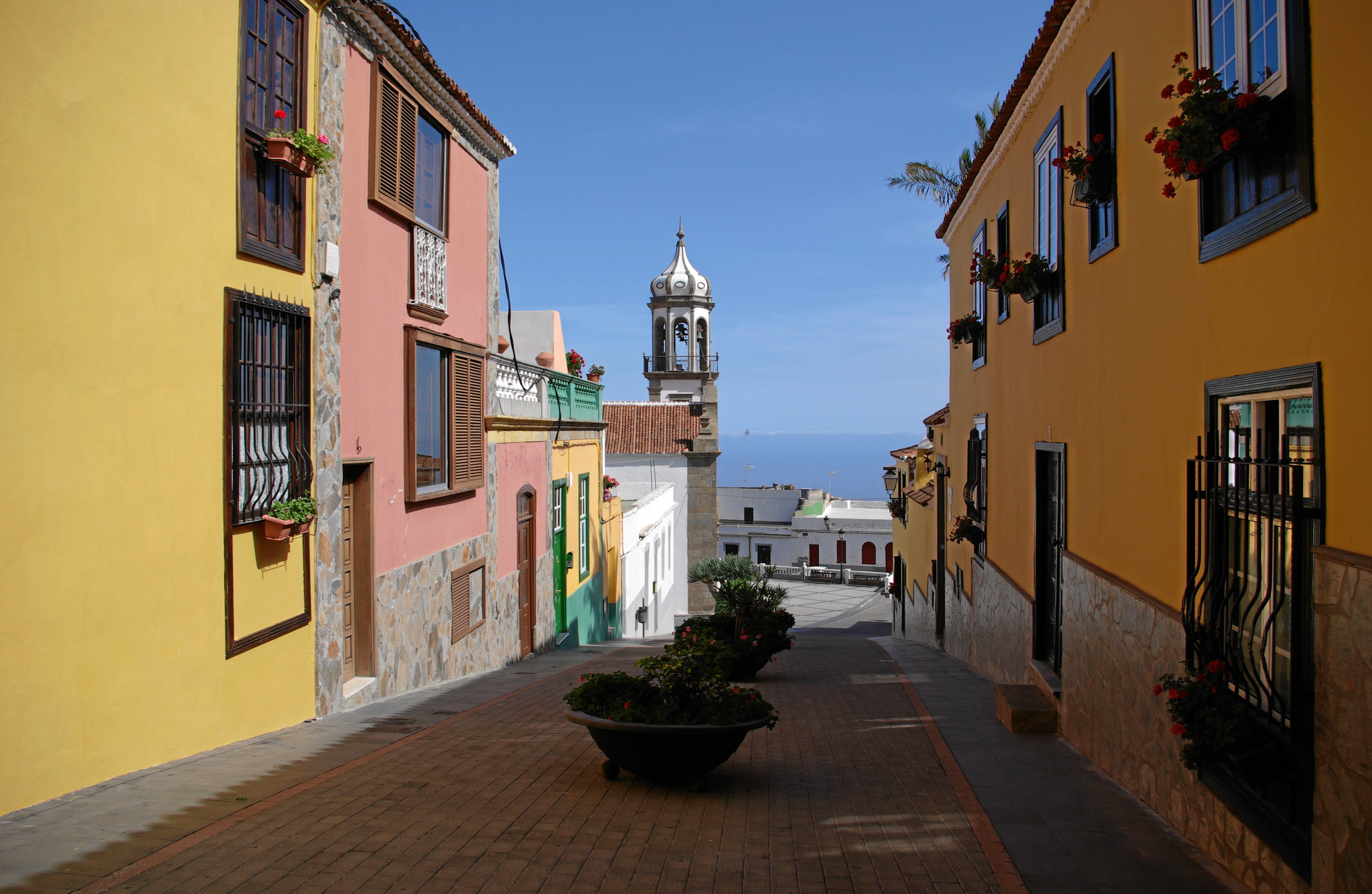
Granadilla de Abona, historic center of the town

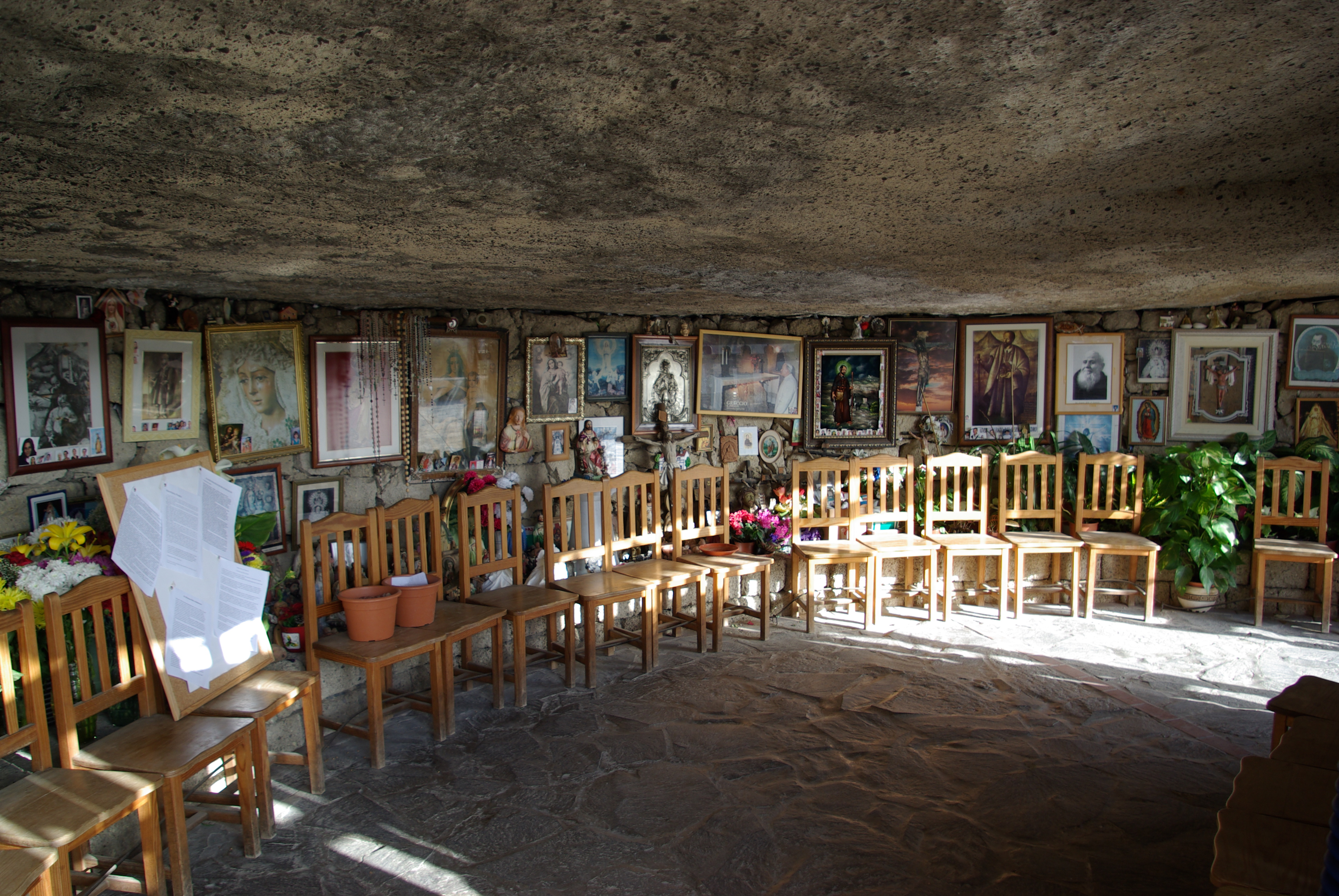
Cave of Santo Hermano Pedro, Catholic pilgrimage sanctuary

Abona was the name of a Guanche menceyato, or kingdom, that existed in this region of the island at the time of Spanish conquest in the late fifteenth century. Founded around 1445, Abona was ruled by Adjona or Atguaxoña, son of Axerax and whose son after the conquest was baptised and named Alonso Gonzalez. It extended from the Río de Chasna to Adeje, from the Barranco de Herques, to Güímar. The Spanish toponym of Granadilla does not appear until the end of the 16th century, but the settlement of the area by Europeans began at the time of conquest.

The Bay of El Médano was the last stop for provisions for Ferdinand Magellan and Juan Sebastián Elcano during the circumnavigation of the world. The expedition's cartographer and translator, Antonio Pigafetta, left this description of the place: "On Tuesday, September 20, in the same year [1519] we departed from the place called Sanlúcar [de Barrameda], heading southwest, and before the end of the month, on the 26th, we arrived at an island that is called Tenerife, at 28 degrees longitude, to acquire meat, water, and firewood. We remained there for three days and a half; later we approached another port on the same island, Monte Rosso [Montaña Roja] by name, lingering there for two days…On Monday, October 3, at midnight, we departed southwards..."

Records indicate that a church existed in the municipality in 1575. A Franciscan convent was founded in February 1665. St. Peter of Saint Joseph Betancur (1626–1667), spent some time in a little cave situated near the present-day town of El Médano. The cave is now the site of a small shrine dedicated to the saint.

Granadilla de Abona acquired the status of a municipality in the nineteenth century, and a highway linking it to other parts of the island in the 1930s. Previously, travel to other parts of the island was only possibly by boat, which departed from the seaside towns of El Médano and Los Abrigos.

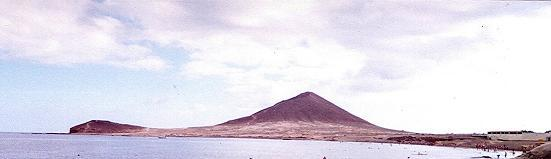
La Montaña Roja, Municipality of Granadilla de Abona

== See also ==
- Port of Granadilla
