= Los Abrigos =

Small fishing village in Tenerife

Coordinates: 28°01′N 16°35′W

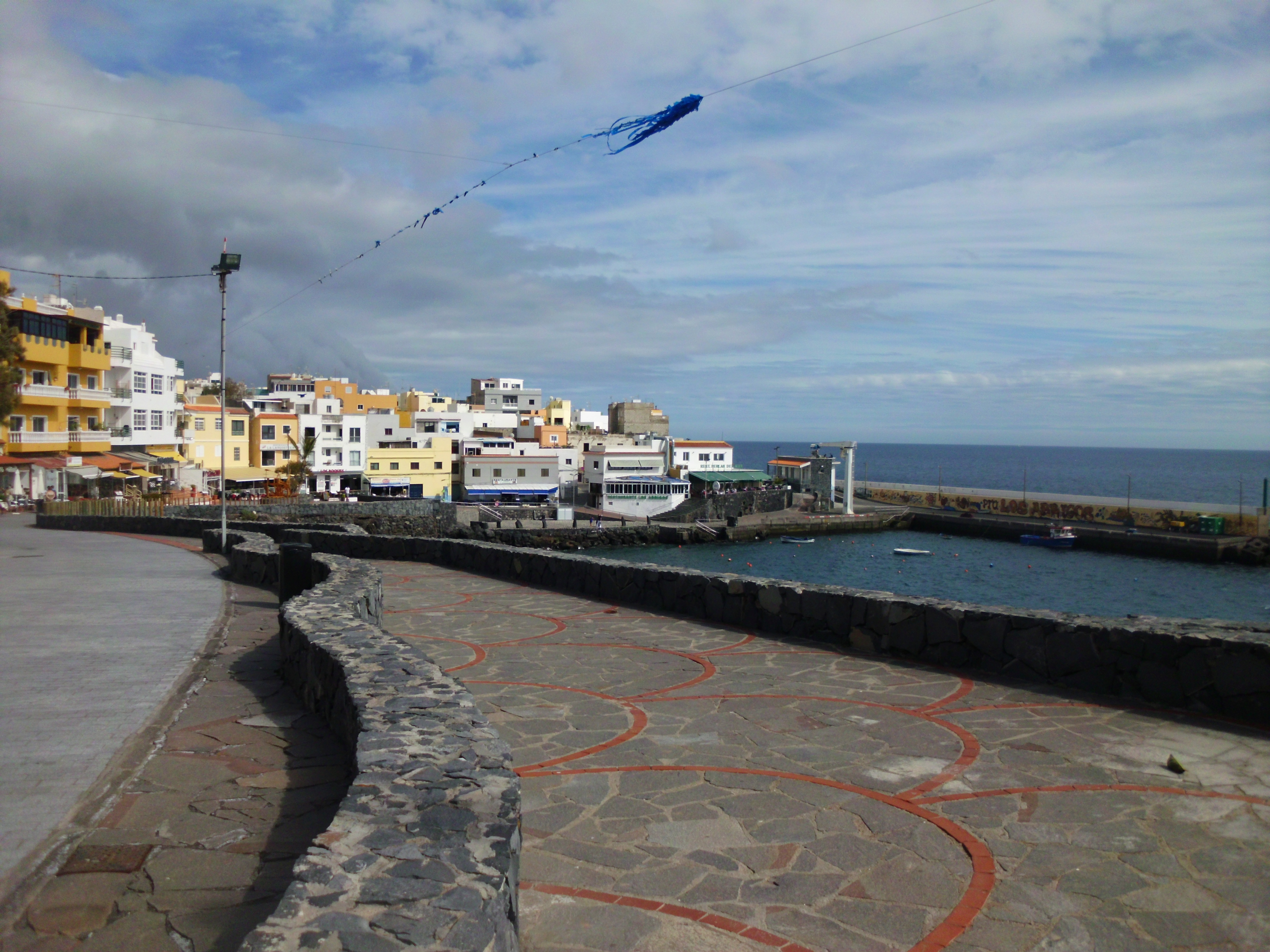
View of Los Abrigos

Los Abrigos is a small fishing village in Granadilla de Abona, Tenerife. It has a small harbour, which developers want to expand.
