= Shepherd's leap =

Folk sport practised in the Canary Islands

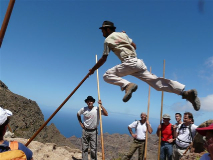
A competitor performing the Shepherd's Leap

The shepherd's leap (Spanish: salto del pastor) is a folk sport practised throughout the Canary Islands.

== History ==
The origins of the shepherd's leap may date back to the Guanches, the aboriginal inhabitants of the islands prior to the Castilian conquest period of the early 15th century. Canarian shepherds required a specialised means of transporting themselves safely across ravines and down steep embankments, and settled on the use of long wooden poles known as lanza or garrote. These poles are fitted with sharp metal points called regatón.

== Description ==
Salto del pastor practitioners have developed a wide range of techniques to facilitate quick and agile movement across extremely difficult and dangerous terrain. These techniques range from pole-vaulting across crevices to the "dead drop" in which the practitioner leaps into space from heights of up to eight metres (26 ft), jamming the pole into the ground below and then sliding down the pole. There are many other types of leaps, depending on the nature of the obstacle to be cleared. Some of these are sufficiently dangerous to have given rise to legends such as the salto del enamorado (lover's leap) and the salto de media luna (half moon leap).

== Development ==
As the shepherd's leap has now developed into a folk-sport, the pole is also used in competitive events, which include climbing up and jumping over walls, speedy descents down steep rocks, precision leaps, and acrobatic feats.

== Other data ==
The lance of the shepherd is part of the iconographic attributes of Peter of Saint Joseph de Betancur, the first Canarian saint, who was a shepherd before becoming a missionary in Guatemala.

== See also ==
- Fierljeppen
