= Bethlehemite Brothers =

Catholic male religious order

Order of Bethlehemite Brothers
- Betlemitas
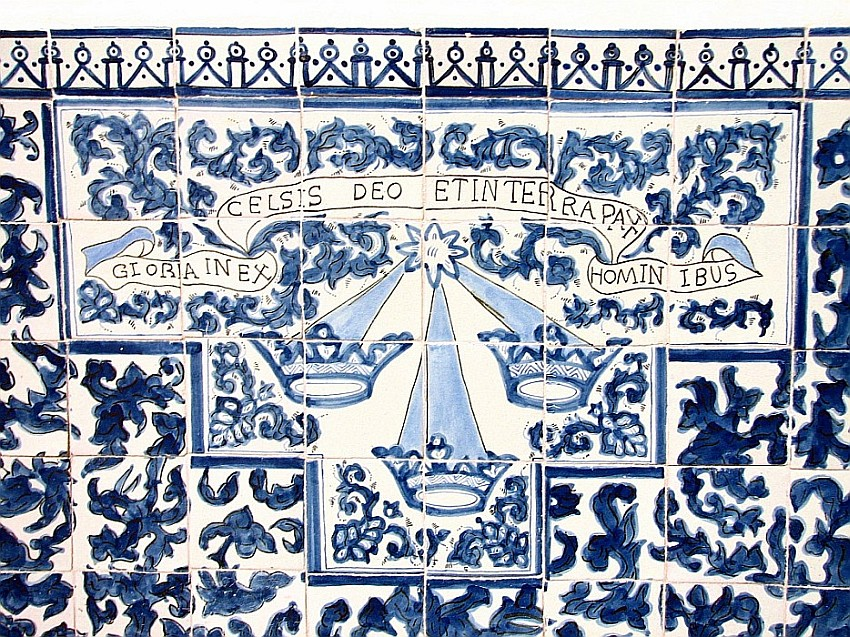
- Coat of arms of the Bethlehemite Brothers
- Abbreviation: OFB
- Formation: c. AD 1658; 368 years ago
- Founder: Peter of Saint Joseph Betancur
- Type: Catholic religious order
- Headquarters: Originally in Guatemala, since 1984 in San Cristóbal de La Laguna, Tenerife

The Bethlehemite Brothers are a religious institute founded in Guatemala in 1653 and restored in 1984.

Their official name is Order of Bethlehemite Brothers (Ordo Fratrum Bethlemitarum: OFB), or Bethlehem Brothers (Hermanos de Belén), and the members, like the members of two other religious orders, are known as Bethlehemites (Betlemitas). They are also known as the Order of the Brothers of Our Lady of Bethlehem (Orden de los Hermanos de Nuestra Señora de Bethlehem). In 2007, the order had 17 members, living in a single community.

== Foundation ==
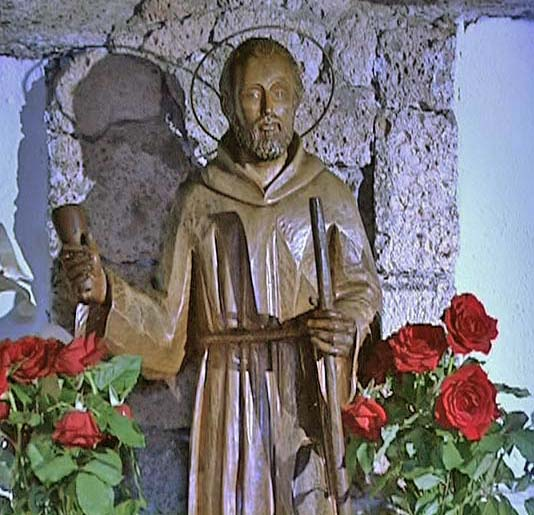
Statue of the order's founder, Peter of Saint Joseph Betancur, in the pilgrimage shrine of the Holy Brother Pedro in Tenerife

The Bethlehemite Brothers were founded in Guatemala in 1658 by Peter of Saint Joseph Betancur, a native of the Canary Islands. From childhood he had led a pious, austere life and in 1650 left family and country to carry out his desire of going to the West Indies. During the following year he reached Antigua Guatemala, a City in the then Viceroyalty of New Spain, and by then the administrative capital of the Captaincy General of Guatemala, where he intended to prepare for the priesthood that later he might go forth and evangelize Japan. Three years of unsuccessful study at a Jesuit college led him to abandon this idea and, after holding the position of sacristan for a while in a church dedicated to the Virgin Mary, he rented a house in a suburb of the city called Calvary, and there taught reading and catechism to poor children.

Betancur converted his home into a hospital for the sick poor. He was supported in this work by the bishop and governor, as well as by donations from private individuals. These donations enabled the purchase of the surrounding houses, so that a larger hospital could be built, Betancur himself working with the masons. The institution was placed under the patronage of Our Lady of Bethlehem, and as a congregation of helpers began to assemble, they were accordingly called Bethlehemites. The Bethlehemites also worked at two other hospitals in the city. Betancur, who had become a member of the Third Order of St. Francis, continued to wear its religious habit.

In addition to his work with the sick, Betancur continued to befriend poor children. The prisoners also excited his compassion. Every Thursday he begged for them through the city and visited them in their cells. The poor souls in purgatory were also the objects of his solicitude and at the principal gates of the city he founded two hermitages, or chapels, wherein religious of his community begged, so that masses might be celebrated for the souls of the deceased. Betancur himself would travel the streets at night ringing a bell and recommending these souls to be prayed for.

Betancur inspired a devotion to the Virgin Mary in his followers. During a novena of preparation for the Feast of the Purification, the Bethlehemites, with arms extended in the form of a cross, recited the rosary in their chapel at midnight in the midst of a great throng. In 1654, Betancur made a vow to defend the Immaculate Conception even at the peril of his life.

Betancur sent Brother Anthony of the Cross to Spain to solicit the king's approbation of the work. The favour was granted, but before the news could reach Betancur, he died at the age of forty-eight on 25 April 1667. His funeral was impressive and at the request of the Capuchin Friars he was buried in their church where, for a long time, his remains were held in veneration.

== Expansion and suppression ==
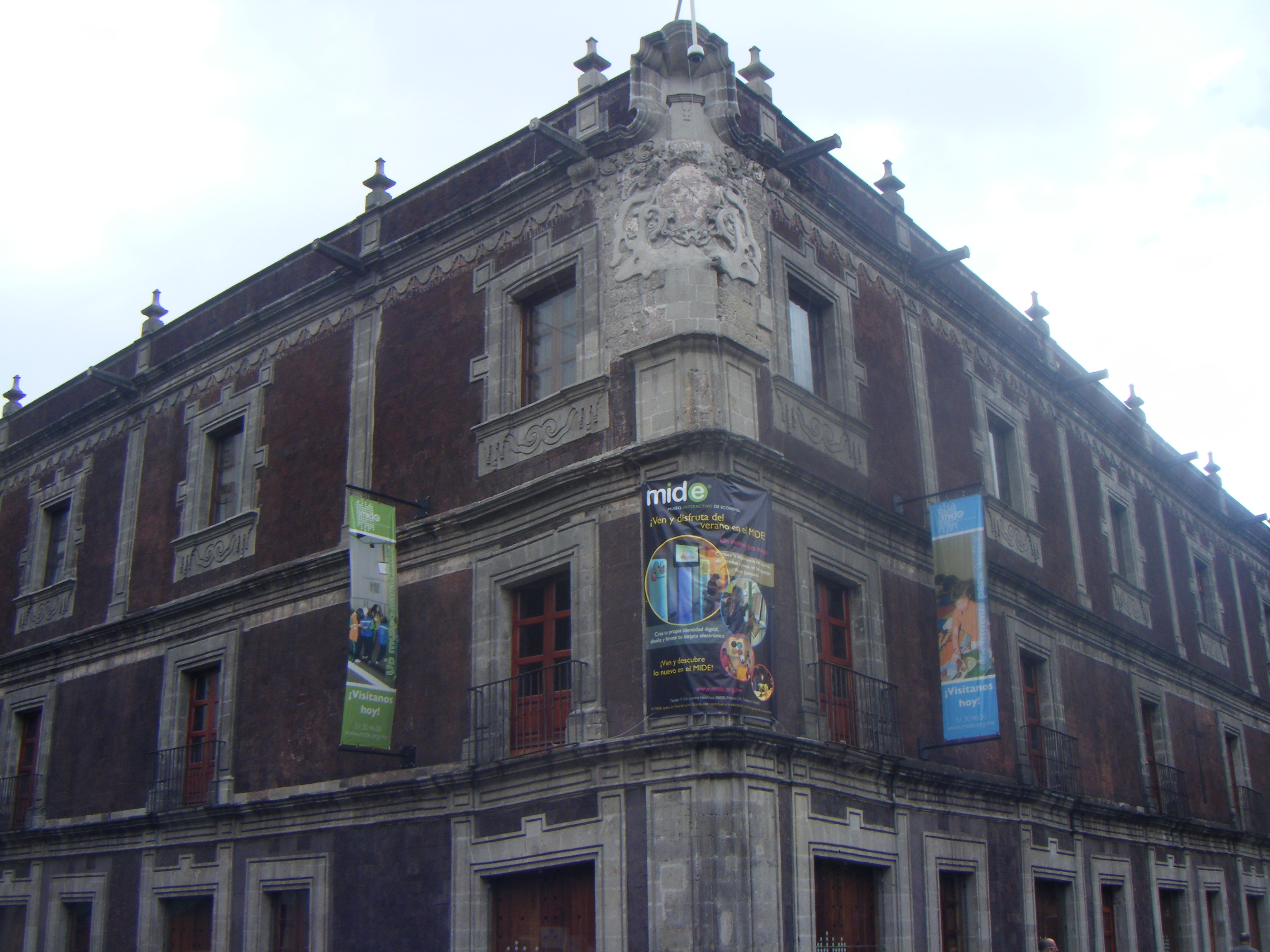
Former hospital of the Bethlehemites in Mexico City, now the Interactive Museum of Economics

From that time the community prospered, beginning with the extension of the hospital and the erection of a beautiful church. Brother Anthony, who assumed the government, drew up constitutions which he submitted to the bishop of the diocese for approval and it was at this juncture that the Capuchins requested him to make some alterations in the habit worn by his religious. A free school for poor children was already connected with the Bethlehem hospital, a feature of all new foundations. One of these was soon undertaken by Brother Anthony of the Cross who sent two of his community to Peru where they were very favourably received by the viceroy to whom he had recommended them. Doctor Antoine d'Arvila gave them the Hospital of Notre Dame du Carmel which he was then establishing at Lima (in Peru) and afterwards solicited admission among them.

In 1672 Brother Roderick of the Cross obtained the confirmation of this establishment by the King of Spain and it was also through his efforts that Pope Clement X confirmed the congregation and its constitutions (1673). After his return to the Americas this religious founded the Hospital of St. Francis Xavier in Mexico and those of Chachapoyas, Cajamarca and Trujillo, going back to Spain in 1681 to secure the confirmation of these new institutions. The Spanish colonial Council of the Indies assigned the hospital of Lima an income of 3,000 crowns. The Bethlehemites, because of making only simple vows, remained under diocesan jurisdiction from which they wished, however, to be freed so that their congregation might be converted into a regular religious order bound by solemn vows. The Spanish court did not approve this plan and at first the Holy See was not favourable to it, but due chiefly to the influence of Cardinal Mellini, former nuncio at Madrid, Roderick of the Cross at length overcame all difficulties and in the Papal Bull of 26 March 1687, Pope Innocent XI authorized these religious to make the three solemn vows according to the rule of St. Augustine (although Peter of Saint Joseph Betancur was a Franciscan) and to have a Prior General, and granted them all the privileges of the Augustinian friars and convents.

Later, Pope Clement XI renewed this authorization and these favours, adding thereunto the privileges of the mendicant orders, of the Regular Clerks, of the Ministers of the Sick and of the Hospitallers of Charity of St. Hippolytus (1707).

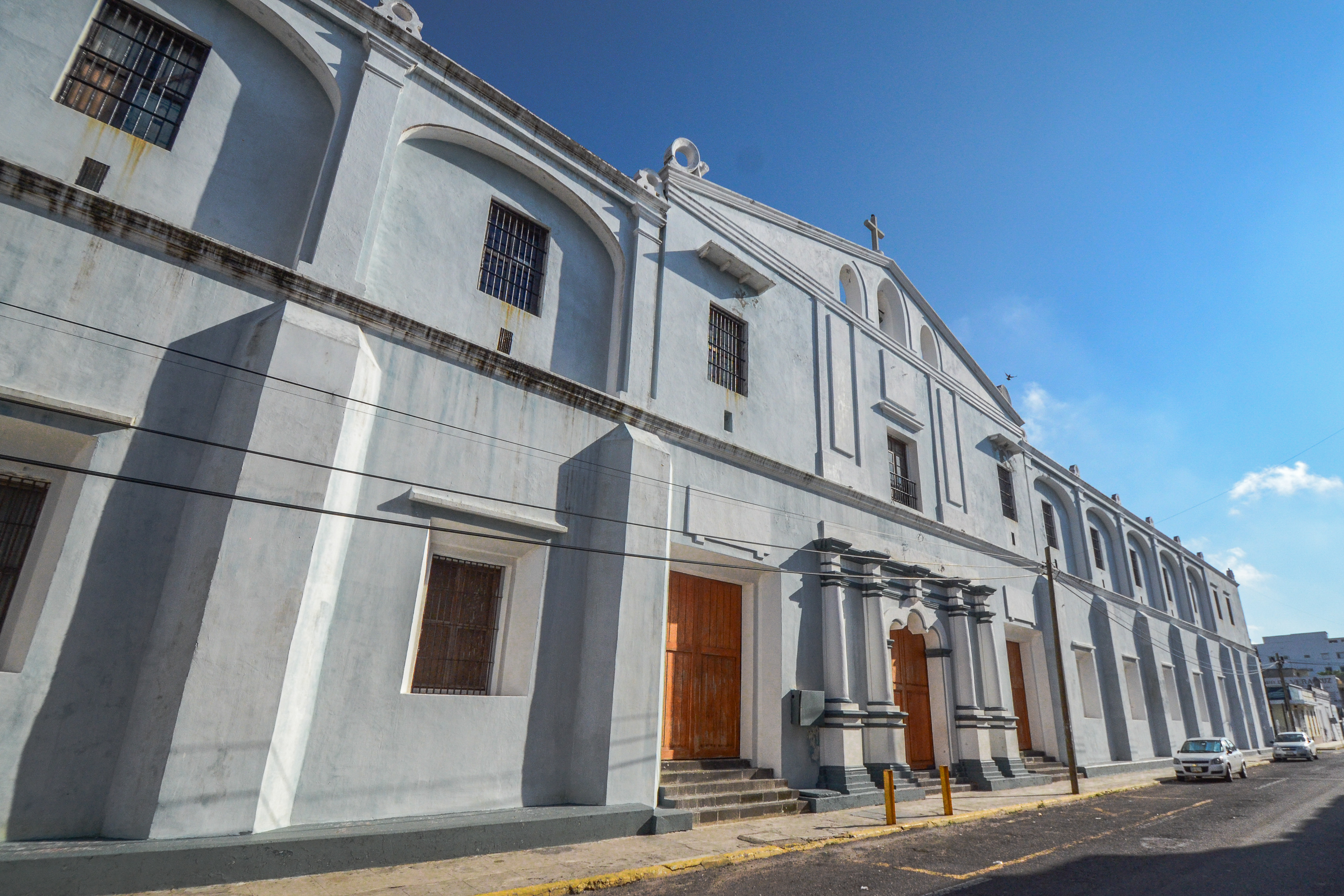
Former Bethlehemite Hospital in Veracruz

Meanwhile, the order was multiplying its foundations in Latin America and was established in Arequipa, Cuzco, Santiago de Cuba, Puebla, Guadalajara, Guanajuato, Dajaka, Vera Cruz, Havana, Santiago de Chile, Buenos Aires and (in 1660) Guatemala la Nueva. A school for poor children was connected with every hospital and the pious, devoted lives of these religious won them esteem and gratitude. They were especially admired during the plague of 1736, a fact unanimously acknowledged by the writers who describe the condition of Latin America in the eighteenth century. But this did not prevent their suppression, as well as that of all other religious, in 1820. At that time their superior-general resided in Mexico and the Bethlehemites were scattered throughout two regular provinces, that of Peru including twenty-two houses and that of New-Spain (mainly Mexico), eleven. To the ordinary religious vows they added that of caring for the sick even at the risk of their own lives.

In 1688. Anthony of the Cross, with the help of Marie Anne del Gualdo, founded at Guatemala a community of Bethlehemite nuns and a hospital exclusively for women. These nuns lived in enclosure and observed the same rule as the men. They, too, were suppressed in 1820.

== Restoration ==
Later in the 19th century, María de la Encarnación Rosal (1815-1886) revived the female branch of the order, establishing houses in Guatemala, Costa Rica, Colombia, and Ecuador. The Holy See restored the Bethlehem Brothers by a decree of 16 January 1984, which came into effect with the profession of religious vows by the first members of the revived Order on 25 April 1986. Their house is in La Laguna, Tenerife, Canary Islands.
