= Vilaflor, Santa Cruz de Tenerife =

Vilaflor
- Municipality
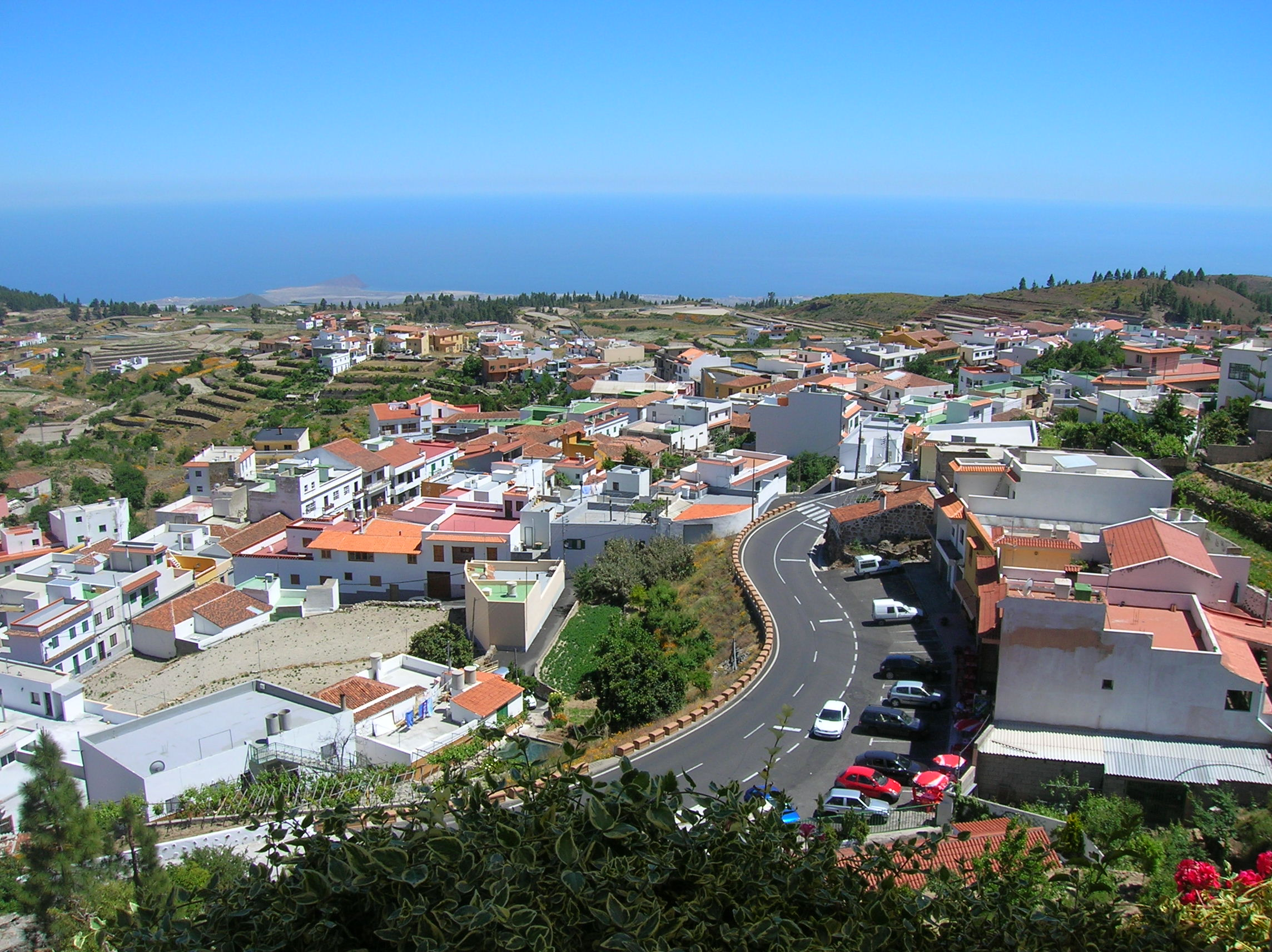
- Vilaflor from above

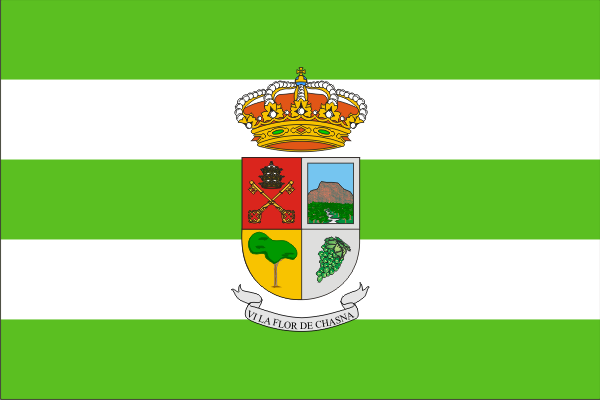
- Flag Coat of arms

- Municipal location in Tenerife

- Location in Province of Santa Cruz de Tenerife Vilaflor (Canary Islands) Vilaflor (Spain, Canary Islands)
- Coordinates: 28°9′30″N 16°38′10″W
- Country: Spain
- Autonomous Region: Canary Islands
- Province: Santa Cruz de Tenerife
- Island: Tenerife

Area
  - Total: 56.26 km^{2} (21.72 sq mi)

Population (2025-01-01)
  - Total: 1,930
  - Density: 34.3/km^{2} (88.8/sq mi)
- Time zone: UTC+0 (GMT)
- Climate: Csb
- Website: www.vilaflordechasna.es

Vilaflor is a municipality and village in the south-central part of the island of Tenerife, one of the Canary Islands, and part of Santa Cruz de Tenerife (province), Spain. Vilaflor, with an altitude of 1,400 m, is the highest village on Tenerife, situated south of the Teide volcano. It is located 7 km north of San Miguel de Abona and 51 km southwest of the island's capital Santa Cruz de Tenerife. The population is 1,645 (2018) and the area is 56.26 km².

== Sights ==
- Paisaje Lunar (Lunar Landscape), a geological phenomenon created by erosion.
- El Pino Gordo (Thick Pine tree).
- The mineral springs of Fuente Alta, which can be found at 1400 meters above sea level in a protected nature reserve. The bottled water company Fuentealta uses from this mineral spring.
- Church of Saint Peter, it is the parish church of the town.
- Sanctuary of the Santo Hermano Pedro, a church built in honor of Saint Peter of Saint Joseph Betancur (Santo Hermano Pedro).

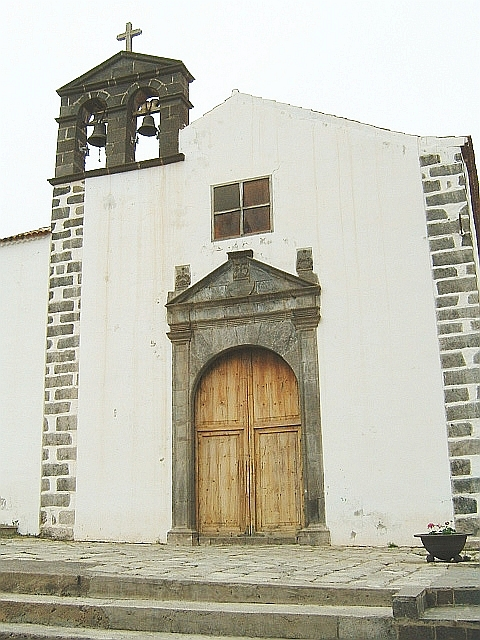
Church of Saint Peter

== History ==
Before the arrival of the Europeans in the 15th century, the territory was inhabited by the Guanches, the first settlers of the island, belonging to the kingdom or menceyato of Abona.

Once the conquest is over, the colonizing process begins with the distribution of land and other goods among the conquerors and settlers by the new governor Alonso Fernández de Lugo. The current town would be founded around 1520, reaching the category of municipality in 1812. In 1533, a hermitage dedicated to Saint Peter was built by the Soler family. In 1568 the hermitage was elevated to the rank of parish church.

Saint Peter of Saint Joseph Betancur was born in Vilaflor in 1626. This religious was a missionary in Guatemala and is the first native saint of the Canary Islands. The Sanctuary of the Santo Hermano Pedro is currently located in the exact location of his birthplace.

Today, vines and potatoes, as well as fruits, flowers and vegetables are grown in the surrounding region. Vilaflor is currently the least populated municipality on the island of Tenerife, with 1,645 inhabitants in 2018.

== Climate ==
Climate data for Vilaflor 1378m (Temperatures:1983-1995; Precipitation:1945-1997)
Month	Jan	Feb	Mar	Apr	May	Jun	Jul	Aug	Sep	Oct	Nov	Dec	Year
Mean daily maximum °C (°F)	13.5 (56.3)	14.4 (57.9)	16.0 (60.8)	16.1 (61.0)	18.3 (64.9)	21.2 (70.2)	27.4 (81.3)	27.9 (82.2)	23.5 (74.3)	18.7 (65.7)	16.0 (60.8)	14.5 (58.1)	19.0 (66.2)
Daily mean °C (°F)	9.4 (48.9)	10.2 (50.4)	11.7 (53.1)	11.9 (53.4)	13.8 (56.8)	16.7 (62.1)	22.7 (72.9)	23.0 (73.4)	19.2 (66.6)	14.4 (57.9)	11.4 (52.5)	10.0 (50.0)	14.7 (58.5)
Mean daily minimum °C (°F)	5.4 (41.7)	6.0 (42.8)	7.3 (45.1)	7.2 (45.0)	9.5 (49.1)	12.2 (54.0)	18.0 (64.4)	18.5 (65.3)	14.8 (58.6)	10.4 (50.7)	8.2 (46.8)	7.0 (44.6)	10.2 (50.4)
Average precipitation mm (inches)	49.4 (1.94)	51.2 (2.02)	34.1 (1.34)	24.4 (0.96)	2.7 (0.11)	0.4 (0.02)	0.0 (0.0)	0.8 (0.03)	7.5 (0.30)	33.8 (1.33)	70.6 (2.78)	56.2 (2.21)	366.1 (14.41)
Average rainy days	5.0	5.0	5.0	4.0	3.0	2.0	1.0	1.0	3.0	5.0	6.0	6.0	46
Mean daily sunshine hours	6.0	7.0	7.0	8.0	9.0	9.0	10.0	9.0	8.0	7.0	6.0	6.0	7.7
Percentage possible sunshine	55	64	58	62	64	64	71	69	67	64	55	60	63
Source 1: Gobierno de Canarias
Source 2: Weather Atlas (rainy days and sunshine data)

Climate data for Vilaflor
Month	Jan	Feb	Mar	Apr	May	Jun	Jul	Aug	Sep	Oct	Nov	Dec	Year
Mean daily daylight hours	11.0	11.0	12.0	13.0	14.0	14.0	14.0	13.0	12.0	11.0	11.0	10.0	12.2
Average Ultraviolet index	4	6	8	9	10	11	11	11	9	7	5	4	7.9
Source: Weather Atlas

=== Historical population ===
Year	Population
2003	1,798
2013	1,804

== Twin towns – sister cities ==
- La Orotava, Spain
- La Antigua Guatemala, Guatemala

== Gallery ==
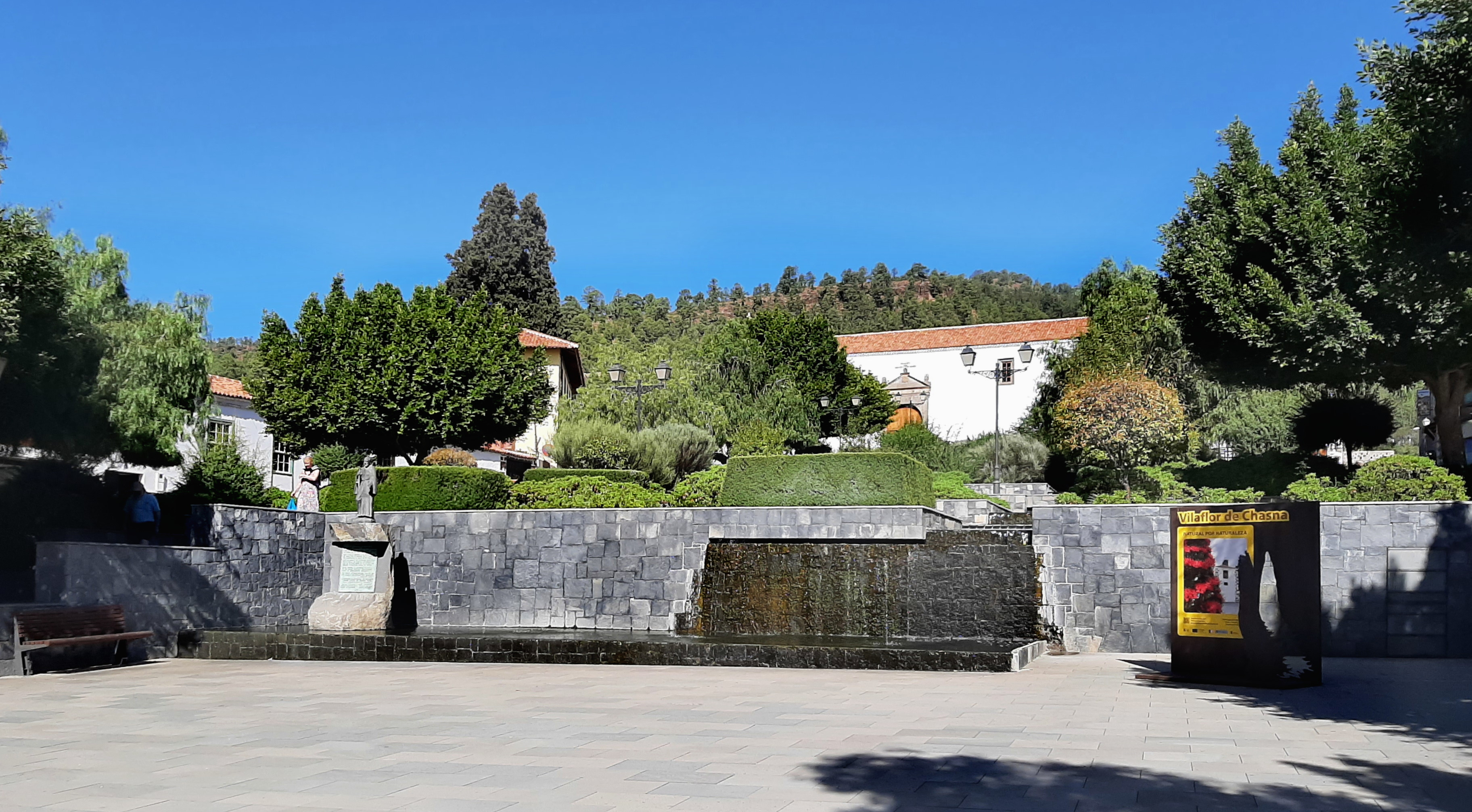
Central square

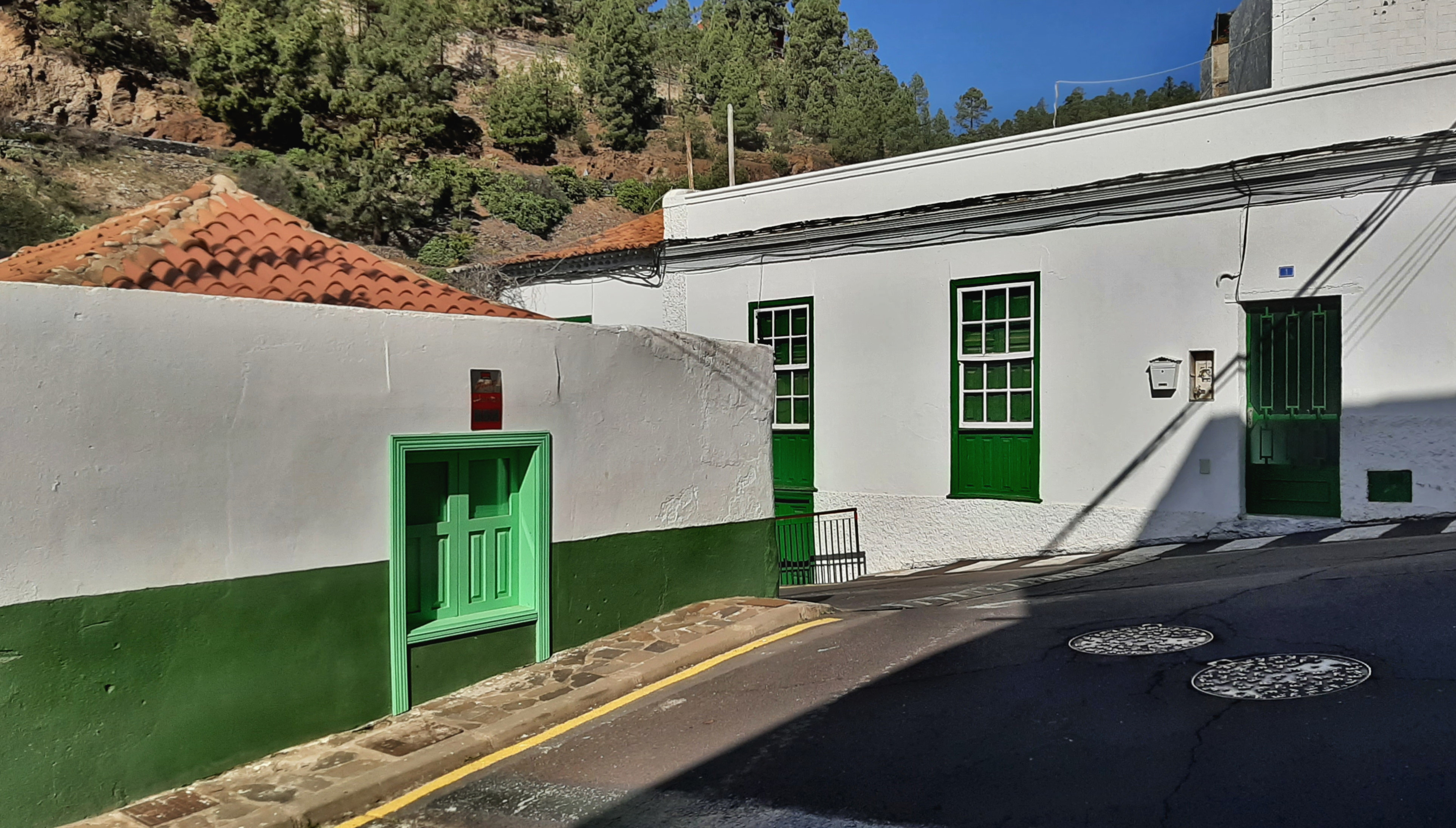
Small houses

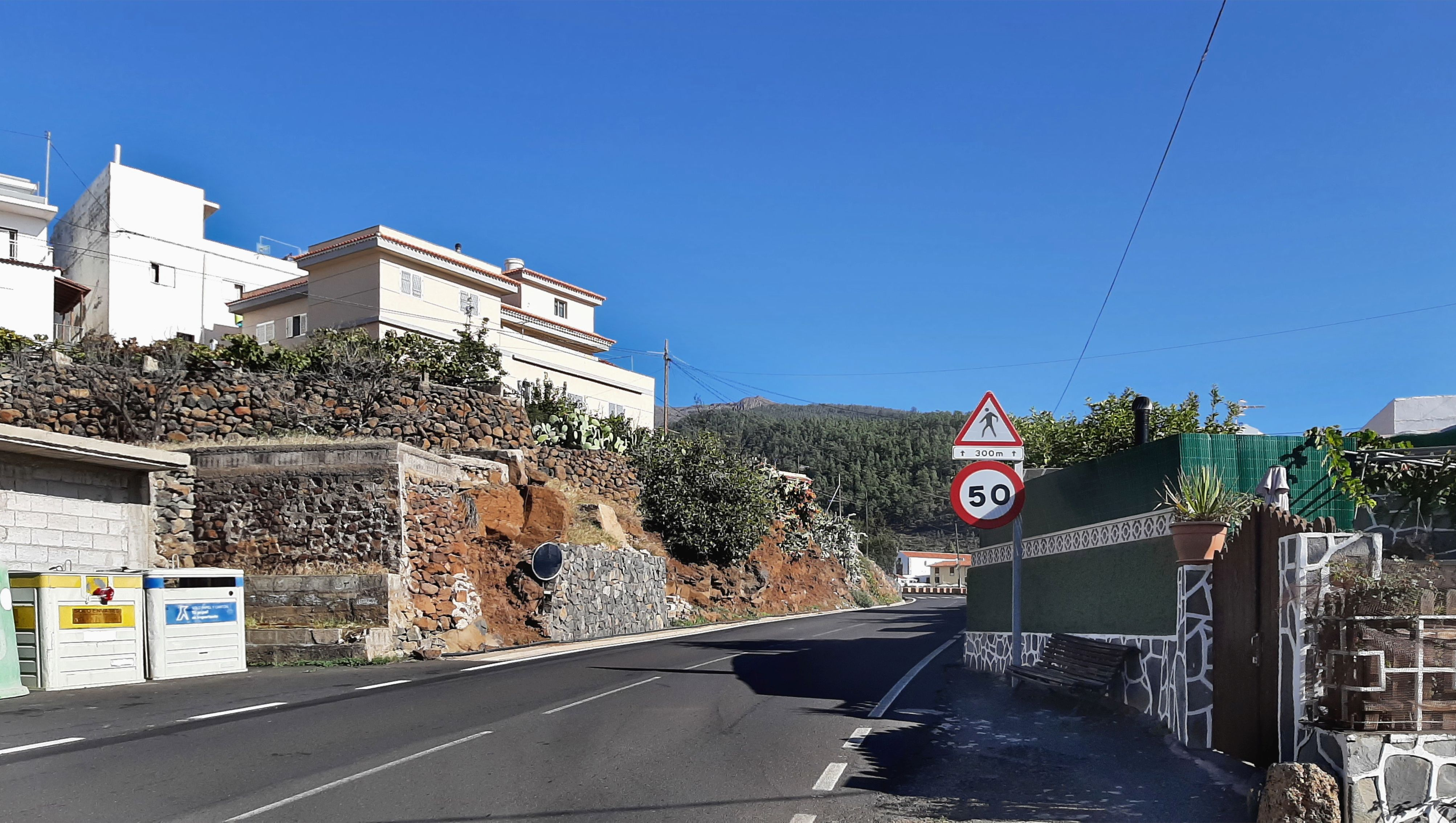
Main road

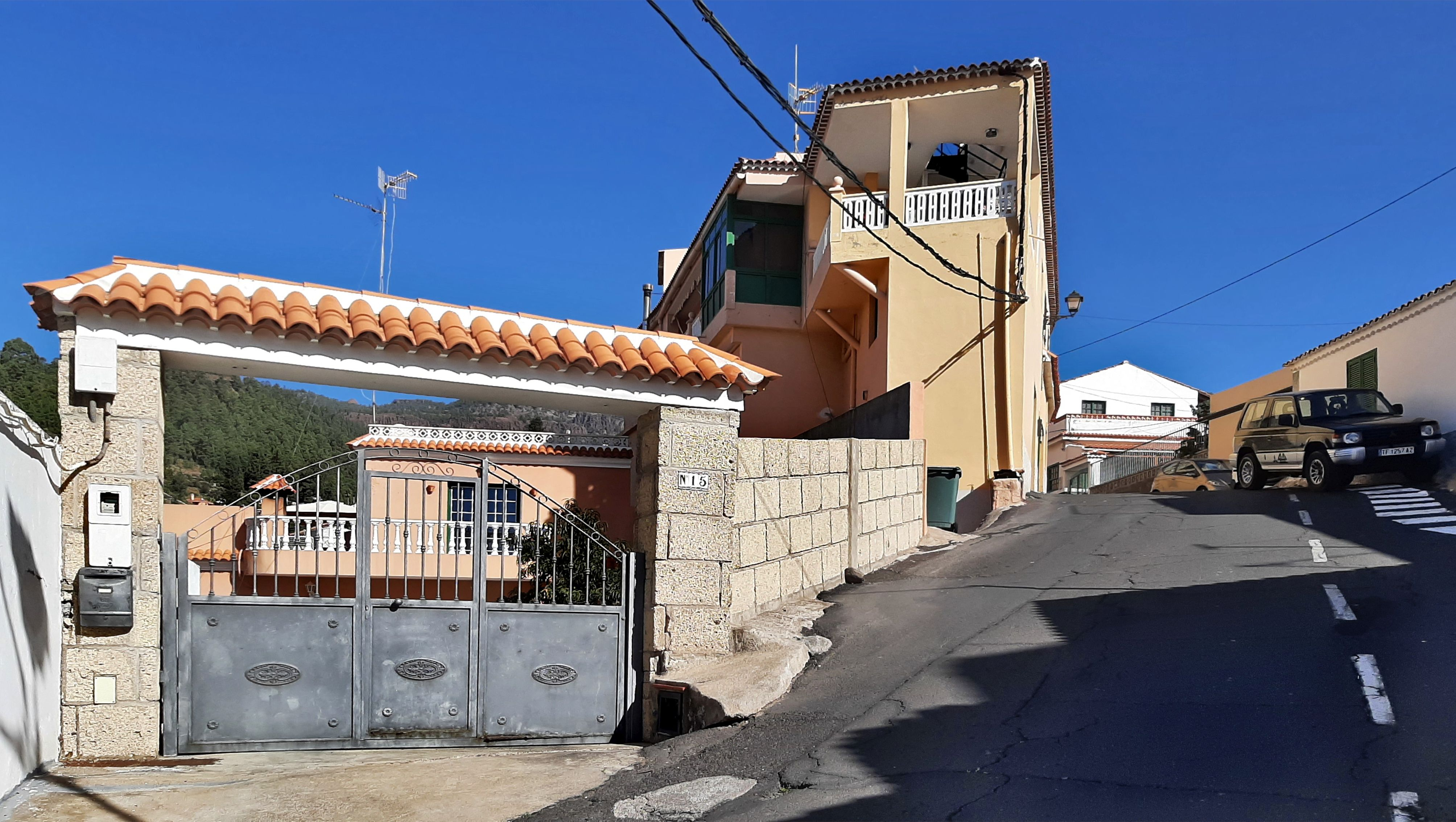
Santo Domingo street

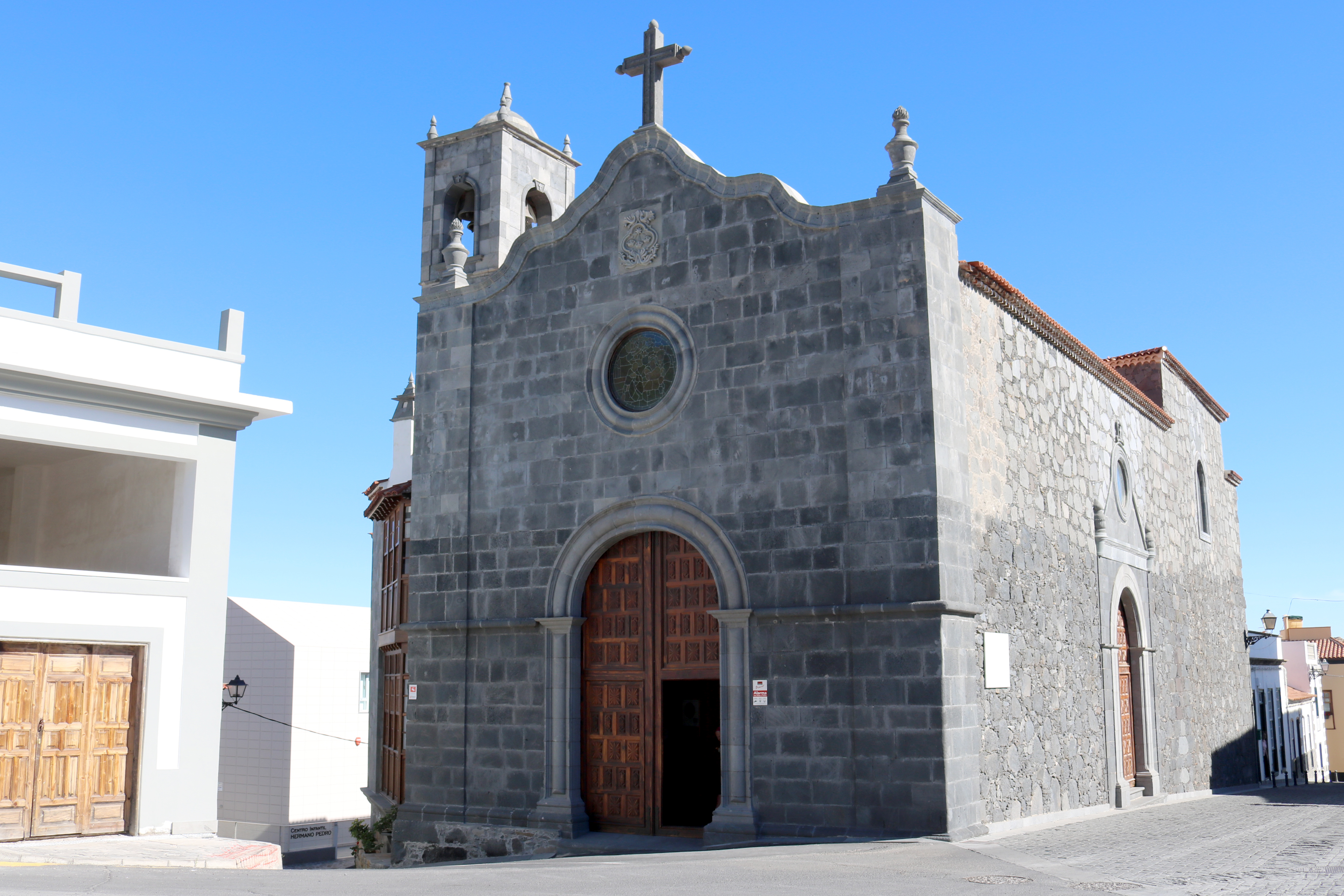
Sanctuary of the Santo Hermano Pedro
