= El Médano =

Town in Tenerife, Canary Islands

Coordinates: 28°02′30″N 16°32′00″W

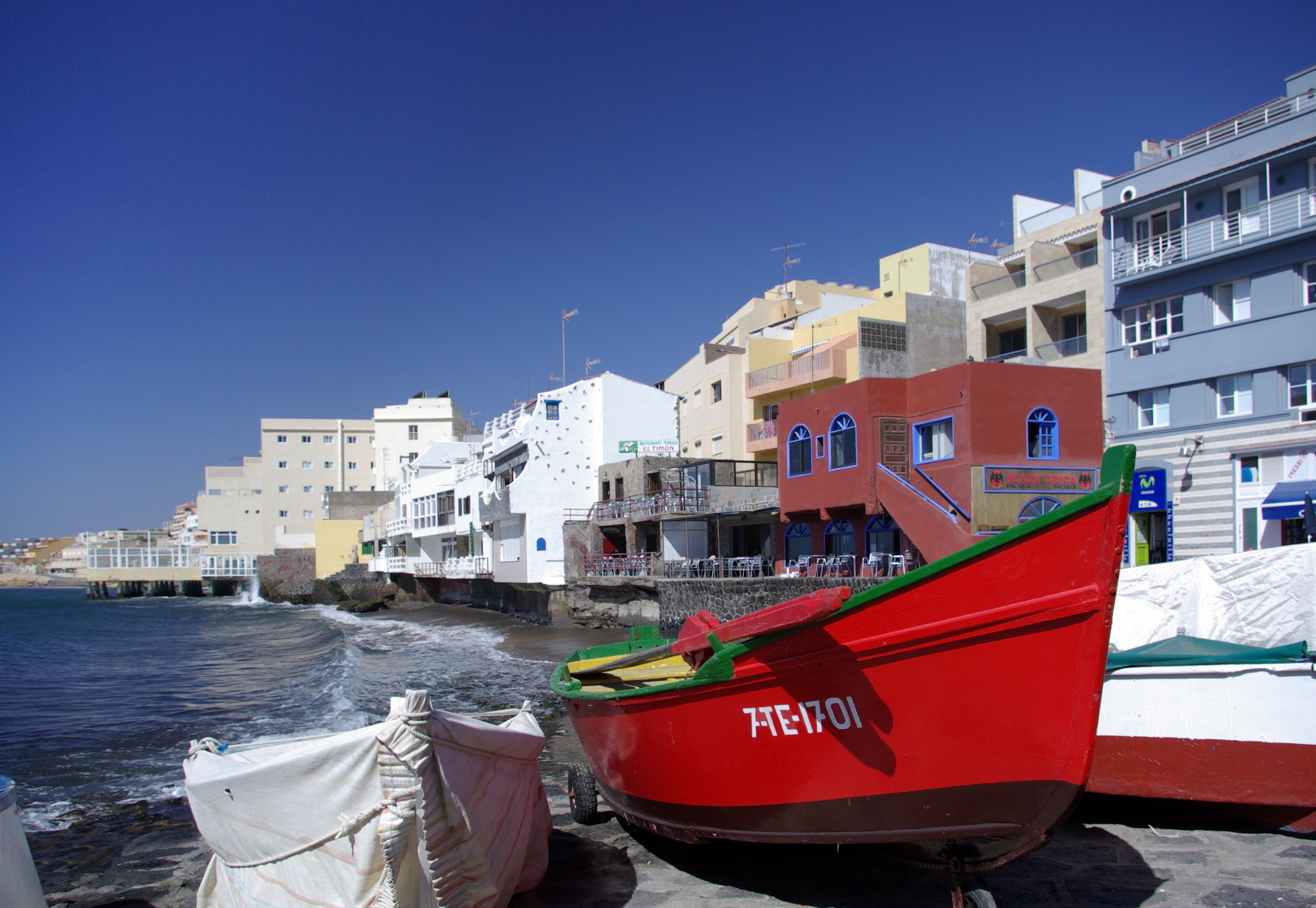
Old Harbour

El Médano (Spanish, "The sand dune") is a town in the municipality of Granadilla de Abona, on the island of Tenerife, one of the Canary Islands. It is located about 11 kilometers from the town of Granadilla, reaching an average altitude of 75 meters above sea level.

The town is divided into five centers: El Médano, Arenas del Mar, El Cabezo, El Topo and Ensenada Pelada.

== Geography ==
A place of strong winds, it has been the site for various windsurfing competitions and championships, though in recent years, an increase in the number of high-rise hotels and apartment buildings has reduced these winds' power. However, El Médano is still one of the world's best windsurfing/kitesurfing locations, with three different windsurfing spots, the Bay (flat/swell), the Harbour Wall (wavespot sideshore), and Cabezo Beach (wavespot onshore). The main bay is divided into three areas, the general sailing area with very good entry and exit points, the swimming area, marked by a chain of buoys and the pigs bay, which is to be avoided because of security reasons.

The town is situated near the largest natural beaches of Tenerife, the Playa Grande and the Playa La Tejita. Between the beaches is La Montaña Roja ("The Red Mountain"), a volcanic cone that is a protected natural reserve under the category of natural monument. The mountain is approximately 1 kilometer in diameter, conformed by successive explosions fruit of the violent vaporization of the sea waters.

In the town, the beach of Leocadio Machado, popularly known as El Médano, stands out. It has an average length of approximately 750 metres and an average width of 43 metres. The beach was awarded the European Blue Flag from 2004 until 2016, and has a changing room and shower service. It was on this beach that Leocadio Machado, professor of Nautics and doctor of Law, was inspired to write the novel "El loco de la playa" (The madman of the beach), published by LA PRENSA in 1925, which tells of the arrival at El Médano of a doctor, Don Luis Gilpérez, and his daughter María, on a boat from the Santa Cruz de Tenerife dock, which they used to do every summer despite the difficulties they suffered, dodging the waves and winds until he disembarked and reached the only inn then on the beach, "La morenita", where, as soon as he arrived, he was warned of the presence of an unknown man who spent the days and nights between the mountains of Bocinegro and Roja, talking to himself and shouting at the sea, who was called "the crazy man on the beach", who had his few inhabitants frightened.

The small coves of El Cabezo, El Salado, La Jaquita, De Pelada and La Rajita are also located here.

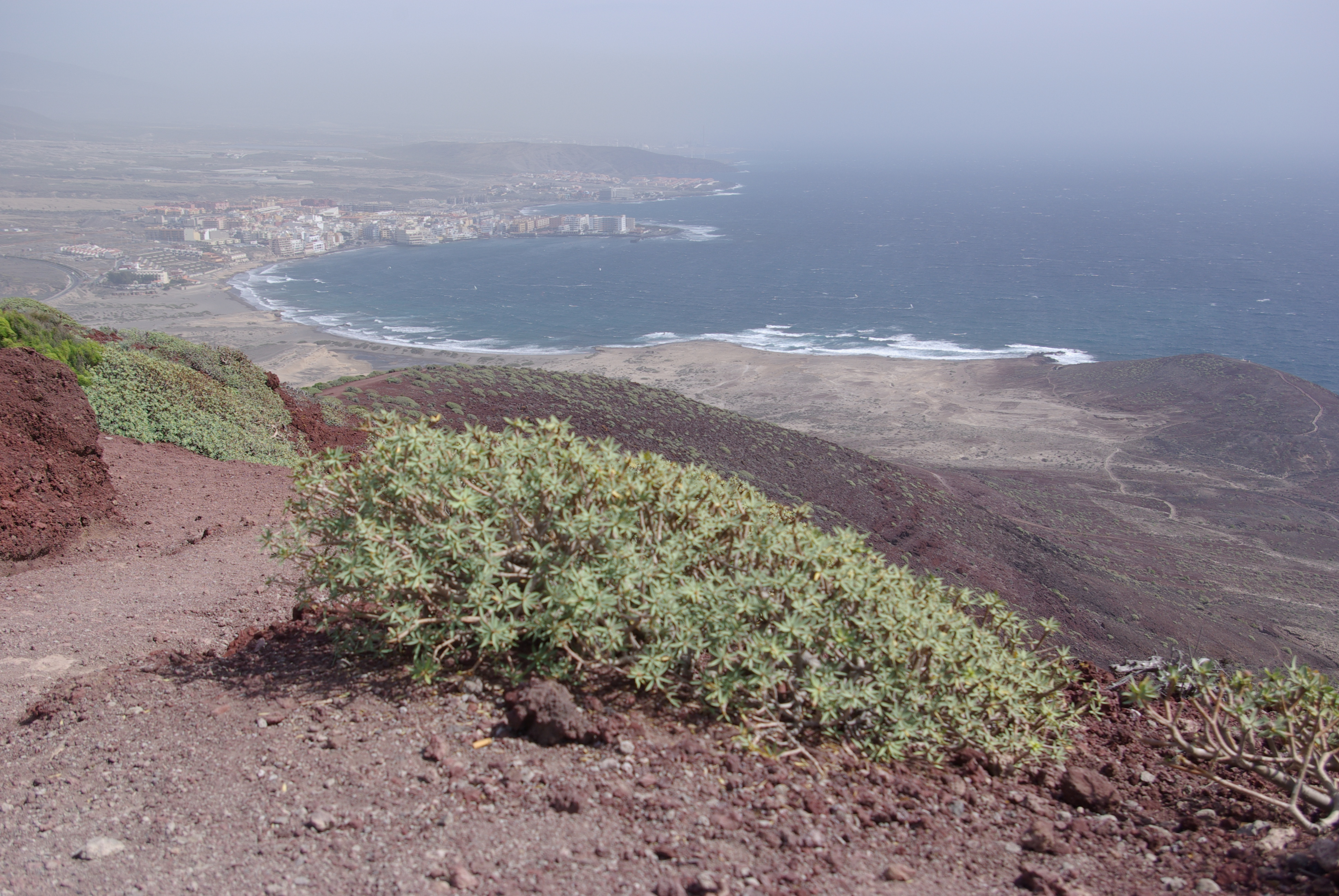
El Médano from the Montaña Roja

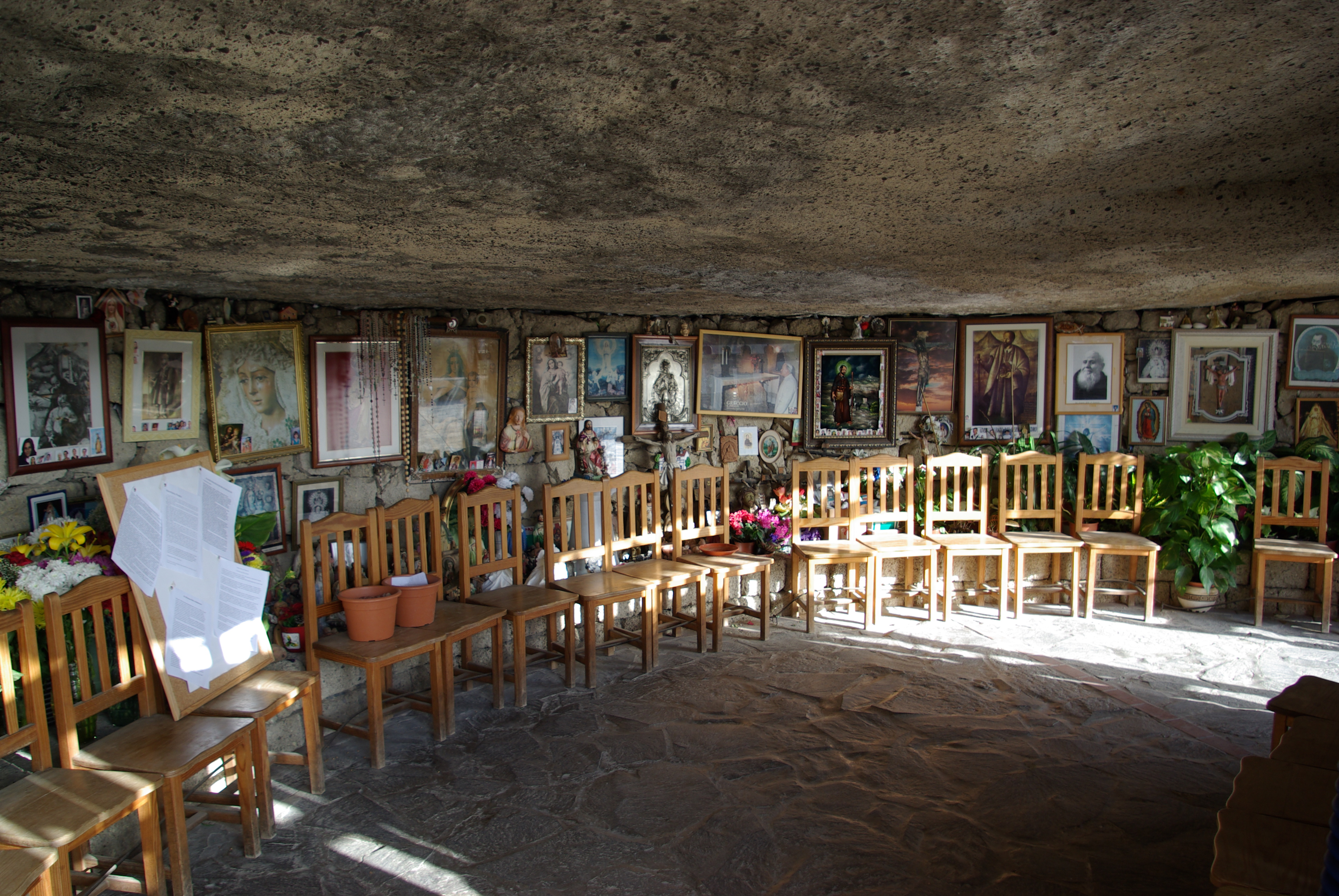
Cave of Santo Hermano Pedro

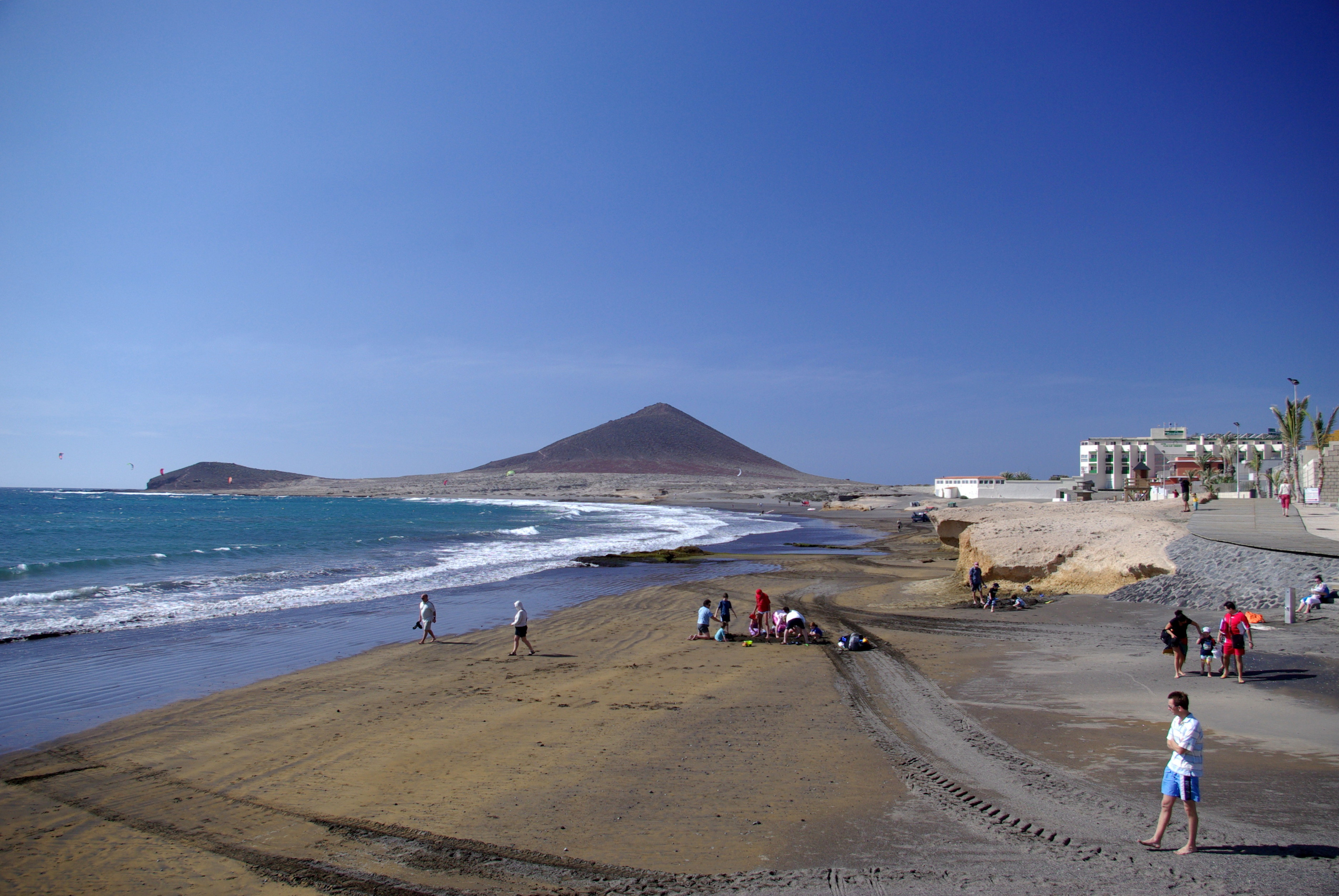
Beach and Montaña Roja

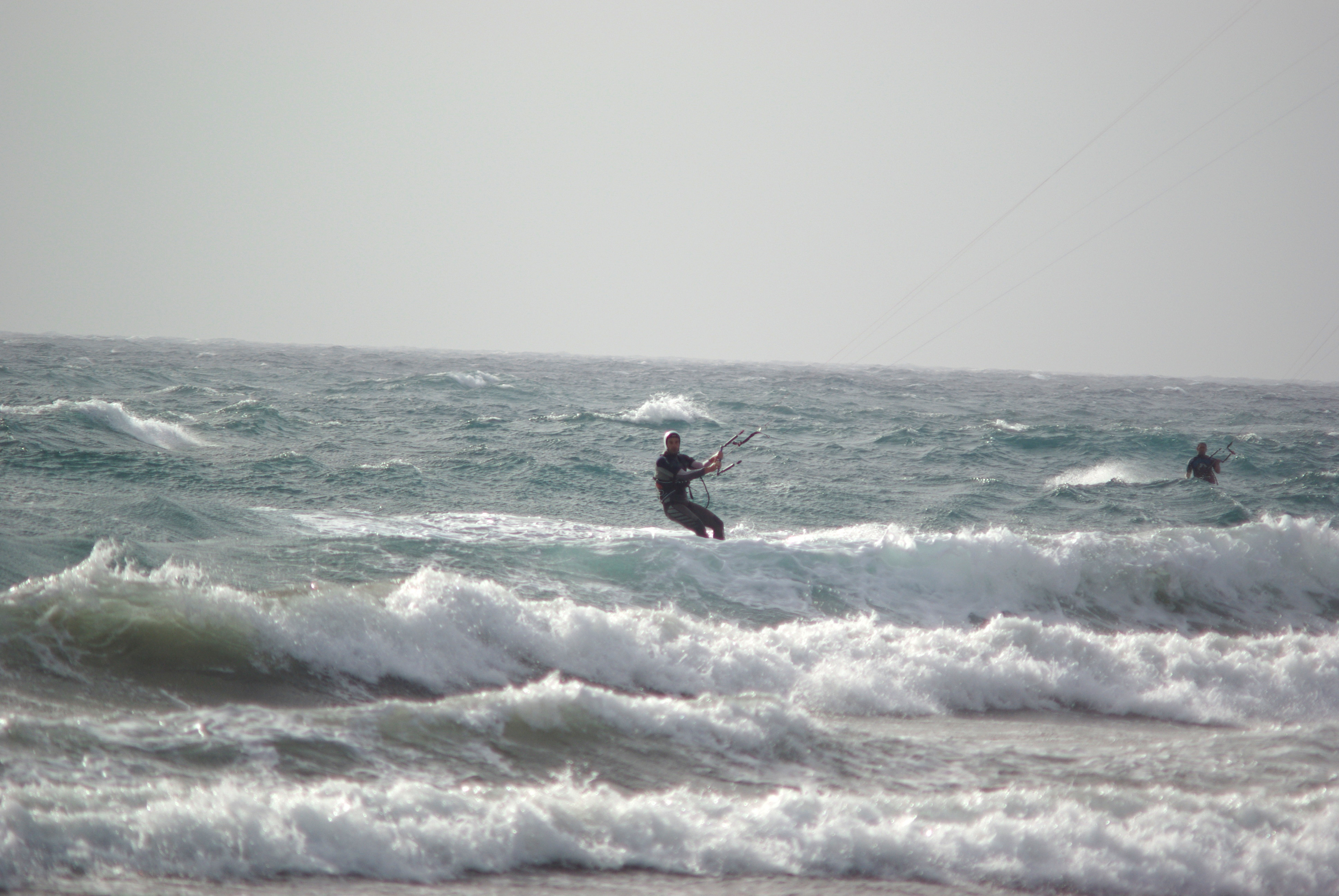
Kitesurfer in El Mèdano

== Amenities ==
There is a large town square in front of the main beach, which holds many local fiestas, especially during the summer months and an annual public firework display across the bay. Around this square are many bars and restaurants. A boardwalk starts there and goes all along the beach up to "kite" beach and through the "medanos" or rocky dunes that are a result of the erosion caused by wind and sea.

El Médano has the educational centres Colegio de Educación Infantil y Primaria El Médano and C.E.I.P. Montaña Pelada, the Instituto de Enseñanza Secundaria El Médano, with offices of the Servicio de Atención al Ciudadano y de Información y Turismo del Ayto. de Granadilla, a civic centre for the elderly, a House of Culture, a doctor's surgery, a shopping centre and a street market, with the parish church of Nuestra Señora de las Mercedes de Roja and a chapel, a post office, several banks, a Civil Protection office and a Red Cross office, a pharmacy, a municipal mortuary, several petrol stations, as well as numerous apartments, bars, restaurants and other small shops. Close to the motorway and the San Isidro neighbourhood is the Granadilla Farmers' Market.

The Technological Institute of Renewable Energies ITER, and part of the Industrial Estate of Granadilla are also located in the town. The cave of Santo Hermano Pedro is located in the town and is place of pilgrimage with a small shrine dedicated to the saint.

El Medano is located just south of the Reina Sofia airport, located in the south of Tenerife. Aircraft noise can be heard quite regularly.

== Demographics ==
Since the tourist boom of the 1960s, El Médano has attracted inhabitants of the capital's metropolitan area - Santa Cruz de Tenerife and San Cristóbal de La Laguna - and residents of the municipality itself, becoming an important secondary residence centre.

In 2013, 41% of the resident population of El Médano was of foreign origin, mainly from Italy, Germany, the United Kingdom and Uruguay. Of the Canarian population, 51% came from Granadilla de Abona, while 42% were from another municipality on the island.

== Panorama ==
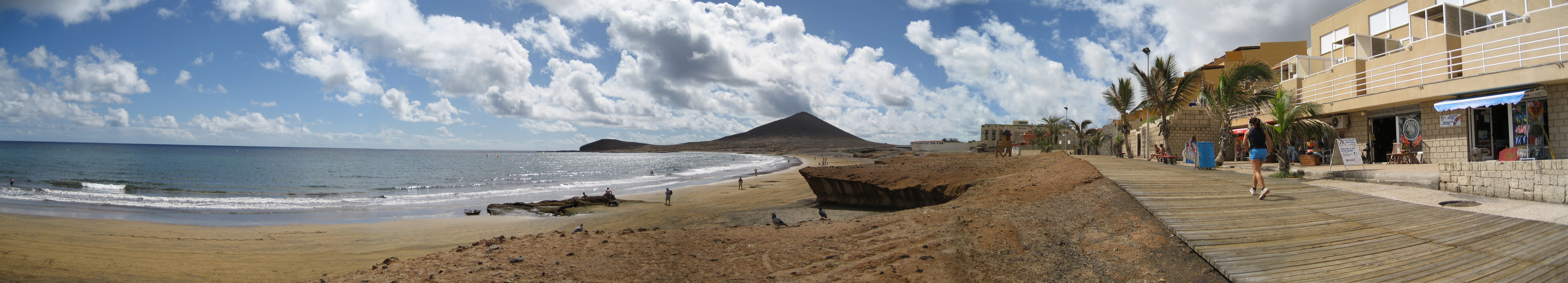
El Medano: Beach delimited by small bays and promenade, La Montaña Roja in the background
