= Cave of Santo Hermano Pedro =

Roman Catholic cave-shrine in the Canary Islands

Cave-Shrine of Santo Hermano Pedro
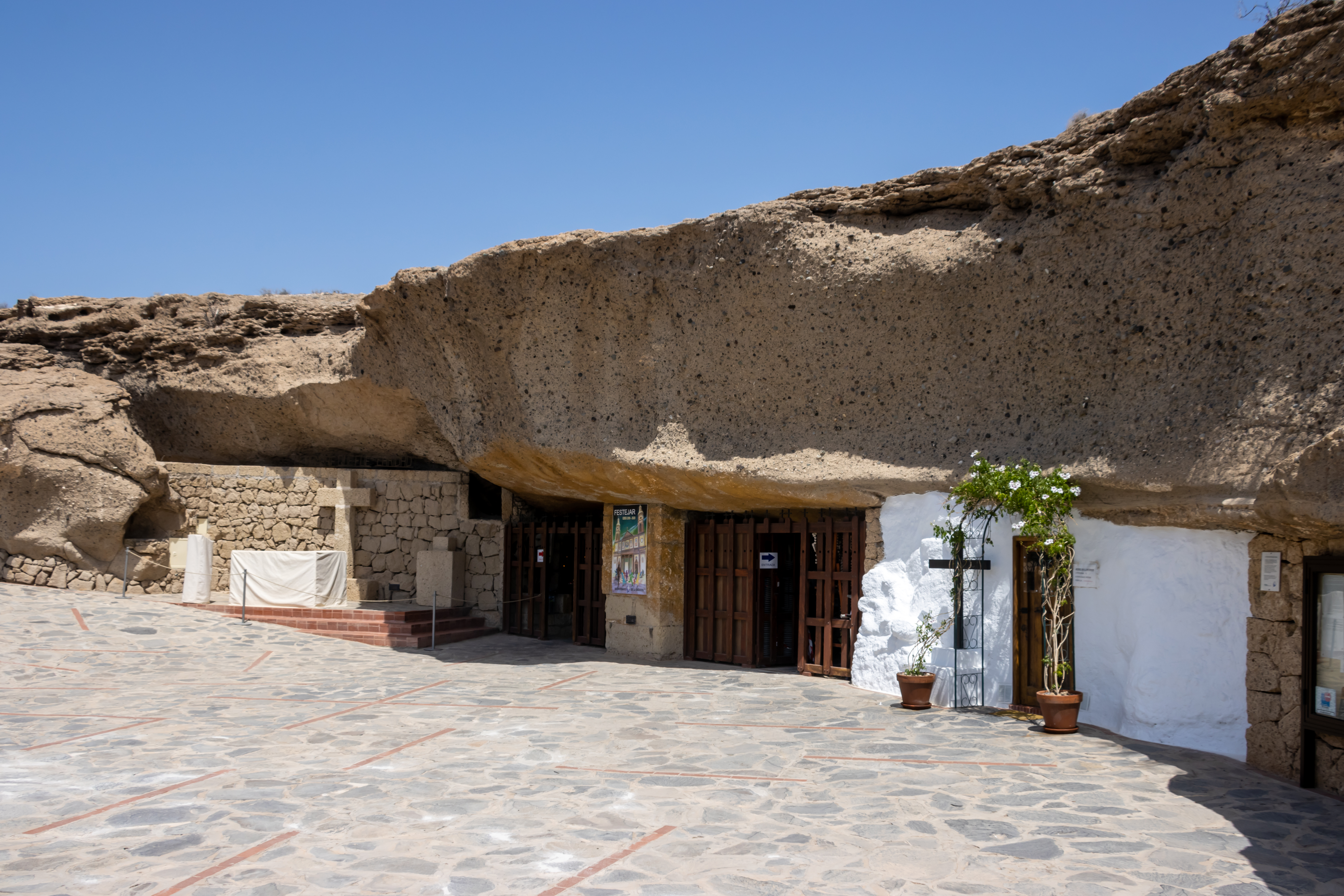
- Cave of Santo Hermano Pedro, Tenerife

Religion
- Affiliation: Roman Catholic Church
- Diocese: Diocese of San Cristóbal de La Laguna
- Province: Archdiocese of Seville
- Rite: Roman Rite
- Ecclesiastical or organisational status: Shrine

Location
- Location: El Médano, Spain
- Interactive map of Cave-Shrine of Santo Hermano Pedro
- Coordinates: 28°03′05″N 16°33′12″W

Architecture
- Type: church

The Cave-Shrine of Santo Hermano Pedro is a Roman Catholic cave-shrine dedicated to Saint Peter of Saint Joseph Betancur (Canary first saint). It is located in the municipality of Granadilla de Abona, near El Medano on the south of the island of Tenerife (Canary Islands, Spain), at the end of the Tenerife South Airport runway.

== Description of the cave ==
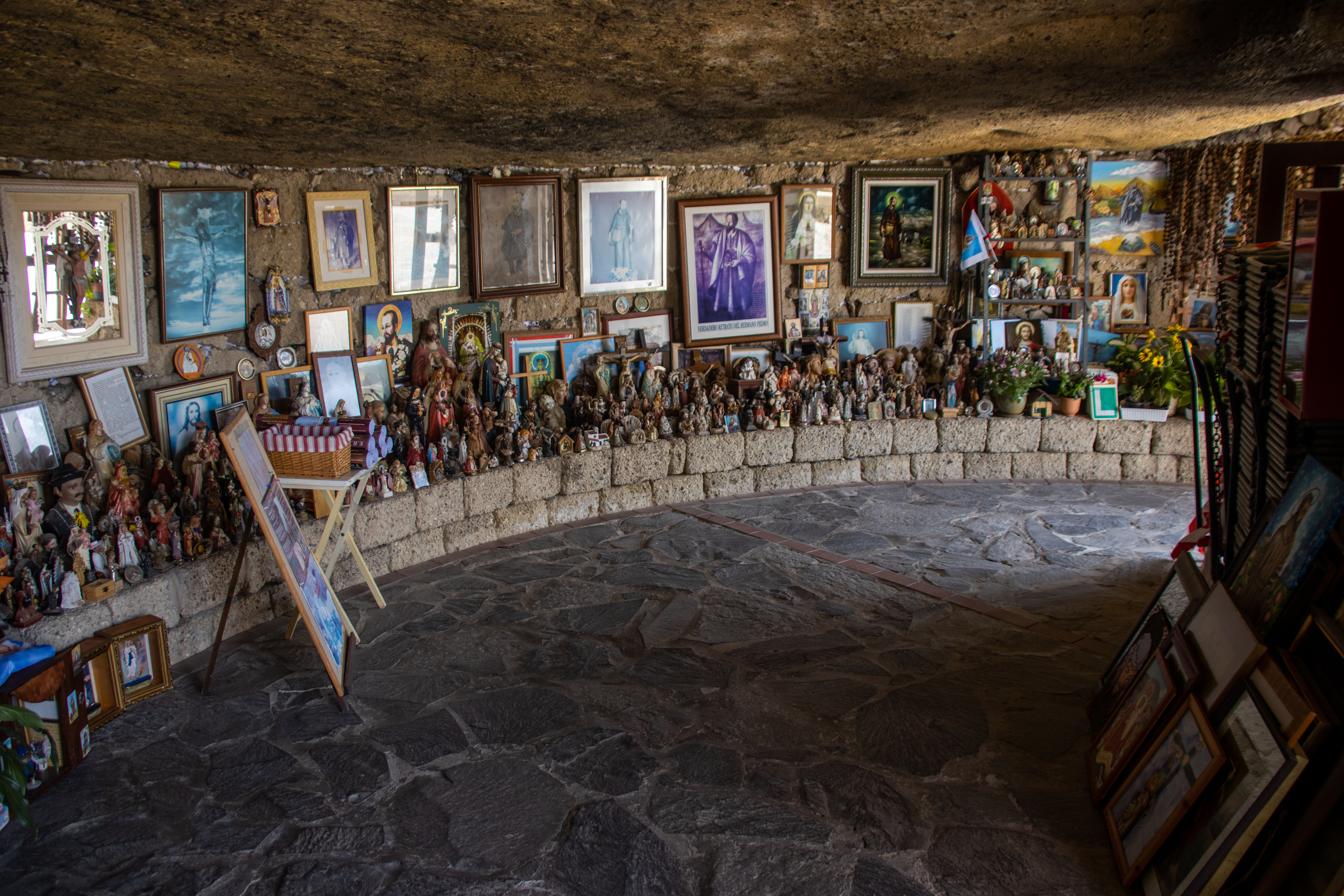
Interior of the cave.

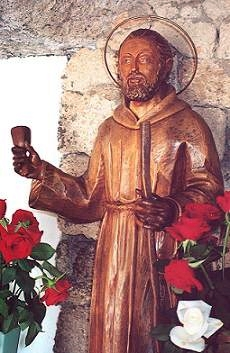
Saint Peter of Betancur statue.

This cave is considered one of the most important pilgrimage spots of the Canary Islands, which annually attracts over 300.000 visitors. In this cave is where saint stood with his flock to rest to recover and walk again forces the way to his small village in the highlands of Vilaflor. In addition, the cave was also used by Peter as a place of prayer and even as a hiding place to protect himself from some pirate attack, which were abundant on the coasts of the Canary Islands at that time.

Currently inside the cave is a wooden statue of the saint, the cave has a section that is completely surrounded with votive offerings of the faithful. In addition, the cave has a relic of the Saint, specifically a part of a rib.

== Protection ==
Since 1999, the cave it is listed as a Site of Cultural Interest by the Government of the Canary Islands.

== Camino del Hermano Pedro ==
In this cave ends the so-called "Hermano Pedro's Way", which is a pastoral route that the Saint traveled to move with his flock along the Chasna region. This route starts from Vilaflor to the Santo cave. Currently during the festival of the Saint in April, hundreds of pilgrims travel this route that has a great religious-historical interest.
