= Bethlehemites =

Name of five Catholic religious orders

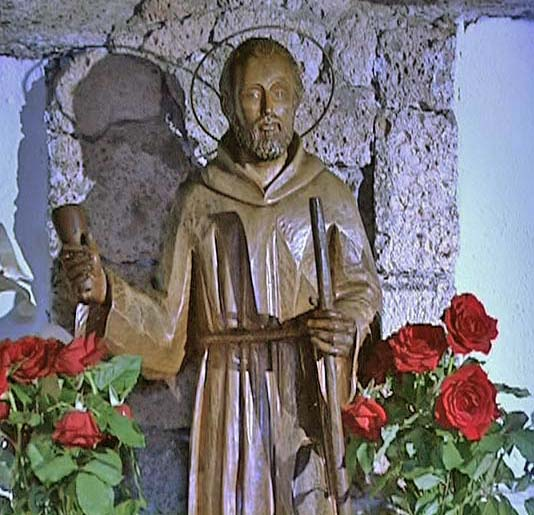
Peter of Saint Joseph Betancur, founder of the Order of Bethlehemite Brothers

Bethlehemites, or Bethlemites, is the name of five Catholic religious orders. Two of them were restored to existence in the 20th century. The other three are extinct.

== 12th-century order in Bethlehem and Italy ==
This order was founded in Bethlehem and managed a seminary there, until the Christian expulsion from the Holy Land. The order then moved to northern Italy, where it remained until it dissolved some time in the 16th century.

== 13th-century order in England ==
The author of an article in the 1907 Catholic Encyclopedia says that, in his Grande Chronique, Matthew Paris mentions that Henry III of England authorized an order of Bethlehemites to open a house in a suburb of Cambridge in 1257; but he leaves us in complete ignorance as to their founder, where they originated, and their history. We only know that their habit was similar to that of the Dominican order and that a red star, whose five rays emanated from an azure center (in reference to Matthew 2:1–11), decorated the breast of their cape. This was in commemoration of the star that appeared to the Magi and led them to Bethlehem. This order is not to be confused with the military order of the Crusaders of the Red Star (Ordo militaris crucigerorum cum rubea stella), who came from Palestine to Bohemia in 1217, where Blessed Agnes of Bohemia confided two hospitals to their charge. They have since remained in that country where they devote themselves to the care of the sick, to education, and to the various works of the ecclesiastical ministry.

The author states that nothing further is known of this order, which he describes as a military order. He thus fails to indicate if it was connected with the Order of Our Lady of Bethlehem to which was entrusted in 1247, under the same king, the London hospital that later became known as Bedlam. This property had been donated to the Bishop of Bethlehem, and members of the new Order of Our Lady of Bethlehem, wore a star on their cloaks to symbolize their obeisance to the bishopric of Bethlehem. This order was founded in the 13th century and its members were known as the Bethlehemites.

== 15th century still-born military order ==
On 18 January 1459, following the taking of Constantinople by the Turks (1453), Pope Pius II founded the knightly Order of Our Lady of Bethlehem for the defence of the island of Lemnos, which Cardinal Ludovico Trevisan, Patriarch of Aquileia, had recaptured from Mohammed II. The island was to be their headquarters, whence they were to oppose the attacks of the Moslems by way of the Aegean Sea and the Hellespont. The order was composed of brother-knights and priests governed by an elective grand-master. The white costume worn by the members was decorated with a red cross and the rule prescribed for them was very similar to that of the Knights of St. John of Jerusalem.

That their needs might be supplied, the pope turned over to them the property and revenues of the Order of Saint Lazarus, the Order of Sainte-Marie du Château des Bretons, the Order of Bologna, the Order of the Holy Sepulchre, the Order of Santo Spirito in Sassia, the Order of St. Mary of the Crossed Friars, and the Order of Saint James of Lucca, suppressing all these orders for this purpose. He alluded in a bull to this foundation and the bravery of its knights, but the second capture of Lemnos by the Turks rendered the institution useless. Thus the Order of Our Lady of Bethlehem was suppressed almost as soon as founded and those orders whose goods the pope had transmitted to it were re-established.

== 17th century Bethlehemite Brothers ==
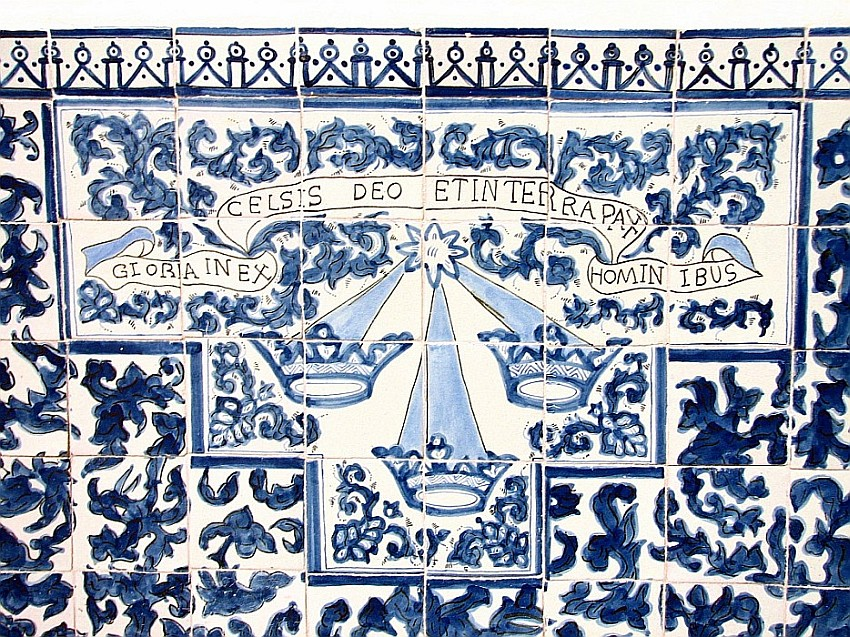
Symbol of the Order of the Bethlehemite Brothers in the Convent of Bethlehemites of Mexico City

The Order of Bethlehemite Brothers (or Bethlehem Brothers) are a religious institute founded in Guatemala in 1653 and restored in 1984. It was the first to be founded in the Americas, and the last religious order with solemn vows to be approved anywhere by the Church before the changes introduced by the 1917 Code of Canon Law. Were founded by Pedro de San José de Betancur, from the Canarias.

Their official name is Order of Bethlehemite Brothers (Ordo Fratrum Bethlemitarum: O.F.B.), or Bethlehem Brothers (Hermanos de Belén). They are also known as the Order of the Brothers of Our Lady of Bethlehem (Orden de los Hermanos de Nuestra Señora de Bethlehem).

In 2007, the order had 17 members, living in a single community at La Laguna, in Tenerife, Canary Islands.

== 20th century Monastic Family of Bethlehem ==
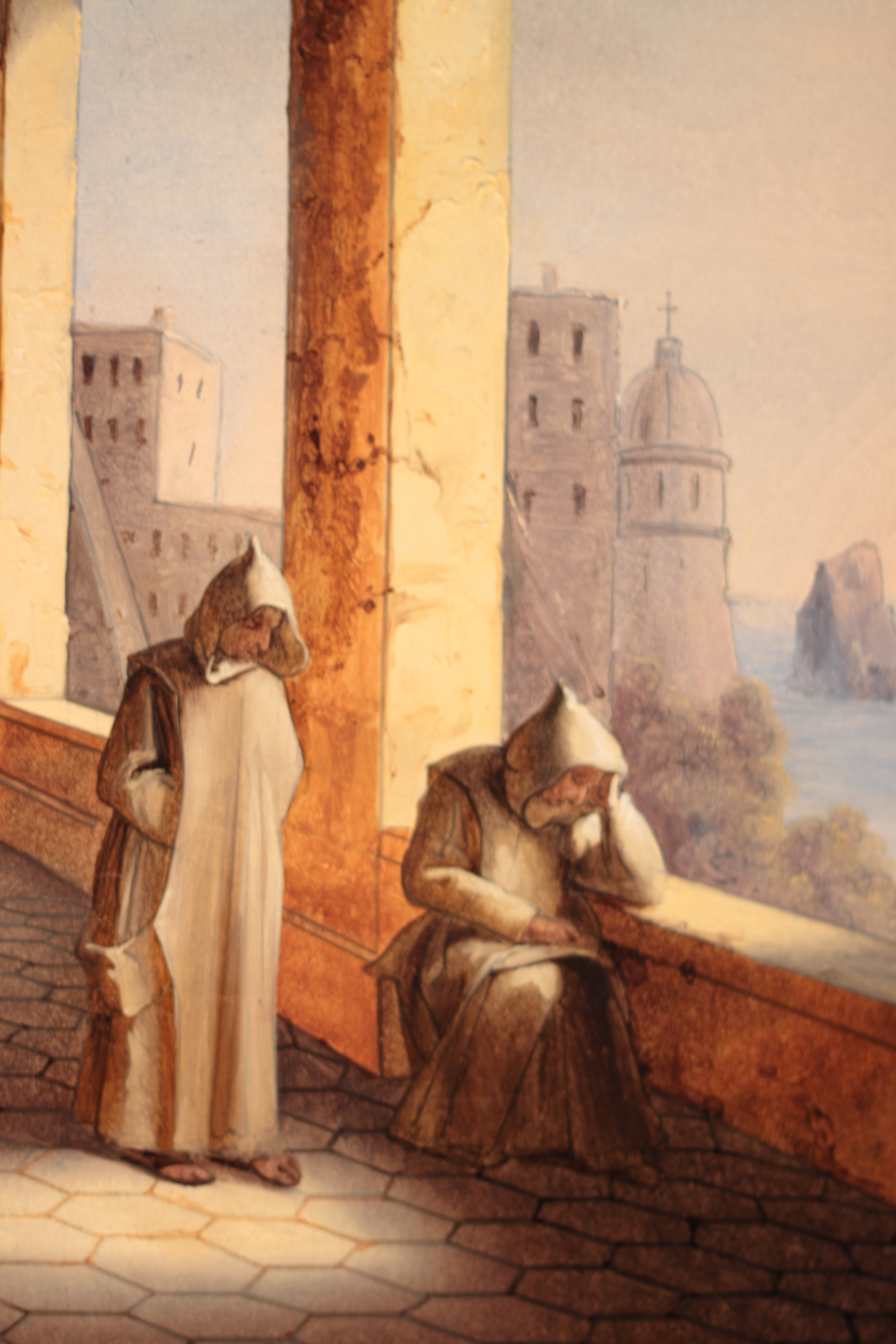
The members of the Monastc Family of Bethlehem wear a similar religious habit as the Carthusians

The Monastic Family of Bethlehem is a religious institute in the Roman Catholic Church with Carthusian spirituality. It was founded in 1950 following the promulgation of the dogma of the Assumption of Mary, by the inspiration of a small group of French pilgrims. The Monastic Sisters were founded in France, soon after, and the Monastic Brothers in 1976.
