= Beñesmen =

- Also called: Beñesmen/Beñesmer
- Observed by: Historically: Guanches; Today: Canarian people and Church of the Guanche People
- Type: Cultural, Pagan (Guanche polytheism, Church of the Guanche People)
- Significance: Harvest Festival, New Year
- Celebrations: Bonfires, divination, feasting
- Date: Held during the first moon of August
- Frequency: annual

The Beñesmen or Beñesmer was the most important festival of the ancient aborigines of the Canary Islands, mainly between the Guanches of the island of Tenerife. It was the feast of the harvest, it ordered Aboriginal affairs materials, and celebrated, venerated cultural and spiritual traditions. It was considered the "New Year", which coincided with the collection of the harvest. They were held during the first moon of August. Beñesmen was also the name with which the Guanches knew the month of August.

In the material order in Beñesmen were held in Tagoror (meeting places) in which the land and areas of farming, herding and fishing were distributed, as well as cattle and swarms, and tasks are assigned to the different members society undertaken in the year starting on that day.

In the spiritual order, Beñesmen was the day that Aboriginals thanked and asked their gods, especially the most important deities, Magec, Achamán and Chaxiraxi, identified by the Guanches with the Catholic Christian Virgin of Candelaria (Patron of Canary Islands). They thanked them and asked the ritual of breaking the gánigo with milk and honey, and the ritual of green candles.

Elements of the Beñesmen were Christianized, to officially move the festival of the Virgin of Candelaria of February 2 to August 15, coinciding with the feast of the Assumption of the Virgin Mary. Currently the pilgrimage to Candelaria, (held during the night of August 14 to 15) is a legacy of this ancient rite of aboriginals. Besides various groups currently they have cultural events to mark the Beñesmen.

== See also ==
- Guanches
- Church of the Guanche People
- Virgin of Candelaria
