= Achuguayo =

God of the Moon - Canary Islands

Achuguayo is a god in the Guanche religion from Tenerife, in the Canary Islands. The name first appears in the work Historia del Pueblo Guanche (History of the Guanche People) by physician and historian Juan Bethencourt Alfonso, who based much of his work on oral sources.

According to the author, Achuguayo was "the term preserved among the common people" to refer to the Supreme Being — Achamán — in Guanche religion, representing for him the personification of Good in eternal conflict with Guayota, the representative of Evil.

Some linguists have translated the term as "behold the one who is spirit, cause, origin, or guardian".
