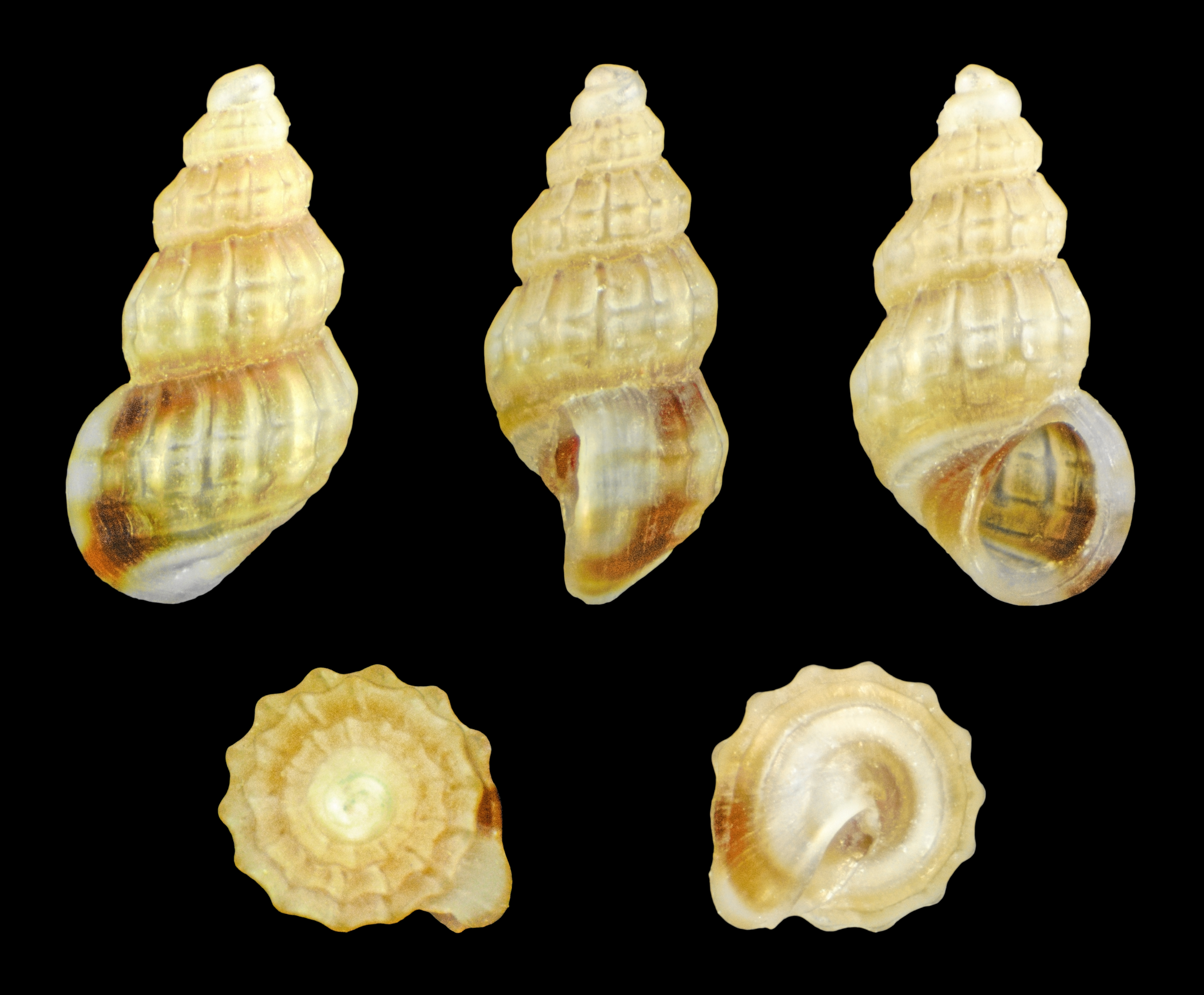

Scientific classification
- Kingdom: Animalia
- Phylum: Mollusca
- Class: Gastropoda
- Subclass: Caenogastropoda
- Order: Littorinimorpha
- Family: Rissoidae
- Genus: Alvania
- Species: A. guancha

Binomial name
- Alvania guancha Moolenbeek & Hoenselaar, 1989

= Alvania guancha =

Species of gastropod

Alvania guancha is a species of minute sea snail, a marine gastropod mollusk or micromollusk in the family Rissoidae. It is named after the Guanche people.

== Description ==
The length of the shell varies between 1.5 mm and 2 mm, averaging at 1.95 mm. Its width generally averages around 1 mm. The protoconch of the shell has a glass-like coloration, while the teleoconch is light brown, with white parts.

== Distribution ==
This species occurs in the Atlantic Ocean off the Canary Islands, specifically near Tenerife.
