= Achuhucanac =

Achuhucanac is the rain god in Guanche religion in Tenerife, identified with the Supreme God (Achamán). Its name comes from: ašu_hu_kanak Guanche language that means "that is in the rain" or "that who is in the rain".
