= Maxios =

Gods or genies of Guanche people

Maxios or "Dioses Paredros" were benevolent minor gods or genies in the Guanche in Tenerife; domestic spirits and guardians of specific places. These were thought to be mediators between humans and Chaxiraxi, the great celestial mother.
