= Chijoraji =

Name given to the infant Jesus carried in the hand of the Virgin of Candelaria

Chijoraji or Chijoragi is a name given to the infant Jesus carried in the hand of the Virgin of Candelaria (called by the Guanches Chaxiraxi) in Tenerife. Chijoraji is the name the aboriginal Guanches applied to this representation of Christ.
