= Tegueste (mencey) =

15th-century Guanche king

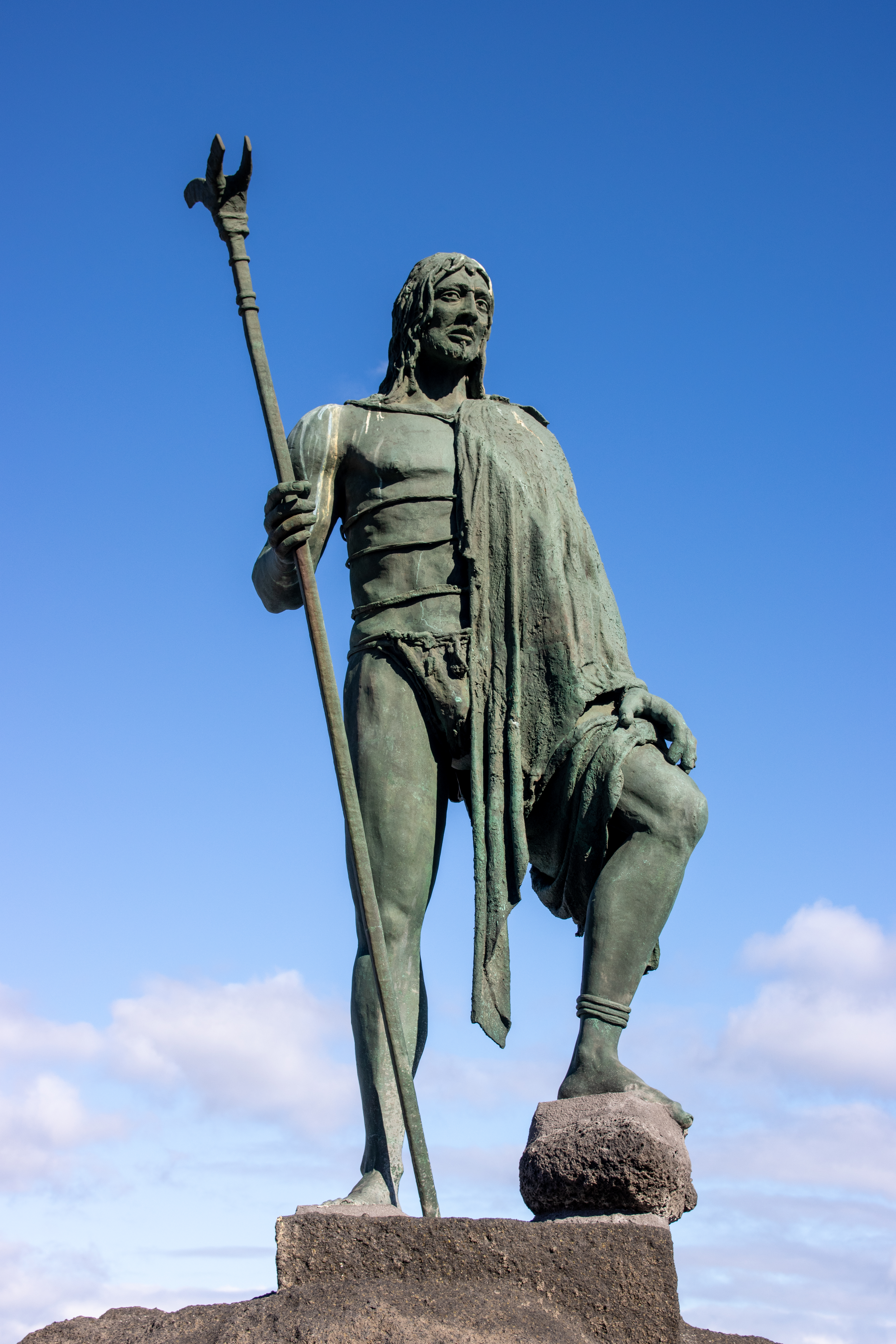
Statue of Tegueste in Plaza de la Patrona de Canarias, Candelaria, Tenerife.

Tegueste or Tegueste II was a Guanche King (mencey) of Menceyato de Tegueste, reigning during the conquest of Tenerife in the fifteenth century.

In 1494, with the arrival of the conquistadors under Alonso Fernández de Lugo, Tegueste allied with mencey Bencomo to reject the invasion, participating actively in the successive confrontations. Tegueste took with him about 1,200 warriors.

At the beginning of 1495 a group of Castilian soldiers made an assault to the Lagoon in search of cattle. There a Guanche woman informed them of the epidemic suffered by the Guanches. The conquistadors made a recognition for the valley of Tegueste, and they made with a cattle booty in the ravine of Tejina. When they returned to La Laguna, they were surrounded by Tegueste and Zebenzuí in the place known as Las Peñuelas, where the conquerors were defeated. Gonzalo del Castillo (who directed the Castilian soldiers) was imprisoned and sent by Tegueste to Bencomo of Taoro.

In the spring of 1496, after the defeats of La Laguna and Acentejo and the loss of the principal Guanche kings (Bencomo, Tinguaro and Bentor), Tegueste surrendered its menceyato to the Europeans in the act of submission known as Paz de Los Realejos. That same year he was taken to the Peninsula by the conquering captain along with another six menceyes to be presented in the court of the Catholic Monarchs.

No further information is known about his fate. Some historians believe that he might have been made a slave by belonging to a side of war, while others believe that under the protection of the monarchs he could be released and under guardianship, though far from the island. It is also possible that it was the mencey that the Catholic Monarchs gave to the Republic of Venice in 1496.
