= Animero =

An Animero (in the Canary Islands, Spain) is a person who is popularly attributed certain holiness.

The Animeros are typical especially in the north of the island of Tenerife, south and to the other islands the figure of Animero gradually becomes less frequent and probably related to earlier forms of Guanche worship prior to the arrival of Christianity. Their worship combines elements of Catholicism with symbols similar to Guanches from the Amazigh environment, similar to the marabouts in Maghreb.

The Animeros are said to contact the dead and cast out demons.
