= Menceyato of Tegueste =

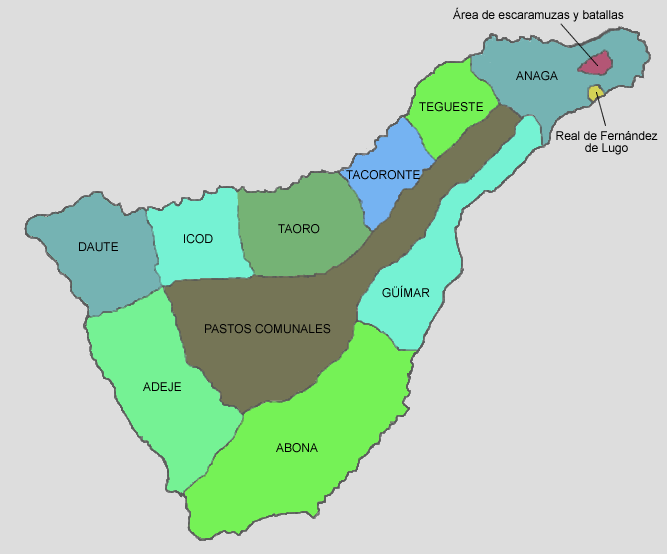
Tenerife prior to the Castilian conquest.

Tegueste was one of nine Guanche menceyatos (native kingdoms), which ruled Tenerife on the Canary Islands before the Castilian conquest.

It occupied the whole extent of the current municipality of Tegueste along with other sites that today are part of the municipality of San Cristóbal de La Laguna.

The menceyato's rulers were the Guanche kings Tegueste I, Tegueste II and Teguaco.
