= Guayota =

Deity in Guanche mythology

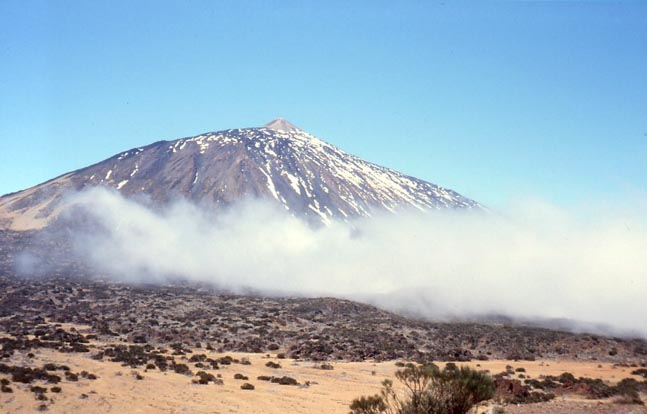
Mount Teide on Tenerife, according to mythology, was the home of Guayota.

Guayota, in Guanche mythology of Tenerife (the Canary Islands), was the principal malignant deity and Achamán's adversary.

== Mythology ==
According to Guanche legend, Guayota lived inside the Teide volcano, one of the gateways to the underworld. He was said to be represented as a black dog and was accompanied by demons, also in the form of black dogs, known as tibicenas.

According to legend, Guayota kidnapped Magec (the sun) and shut it up in Teide, plunging the world into darkness. Humans prayed to Achamán who saved Magec and instead locked Guayota up in Teide. Guayota is the king of evil genies, and was part of Guanche mythology.

== Features ==
Guayota shares features similar to other malignant deity-inhabitants of volcanoes as in the case of the goddess Pele in Hawaiian mythology, who lived in the Kīlauea volcano and was regarded by the native Hawaiians as responsible for the eruptions of the volcano.

== In popular culture ==
Currently, like other aboriginal gods, Guayota remains a typical Canary folklore creature. His evocation is present in many and varied elements of popular culture:

- In the northern city of Puerto de la Cruz a pub is named after him: the Pub Guayota.
- In Granadilla de Abona the association Bomberos Guayota (Guayota Firemen) is based.
- There is also the Grupo Folklórico Guayota.
- A heavy metal band is named after him.
- The 2018 and 2019 champions of Spanish beach ultimate are named Guayota.
- Guayota is featured as the main antagonist in Night Broken by Patricia Briggs, the eighth novel in her Mercy Thompson series.
- In the indie video game Gaurodan, Guayota appears as the final boss.
- In the 2015 book The Evil Among Us, Guayota is mentioned.

== See also ==
- The Canarian lizard genus Gallotia and the species Gallotia galloti are named after the naturalist D Gallot, not after Guayota.
