= Menceyato of Anaga =

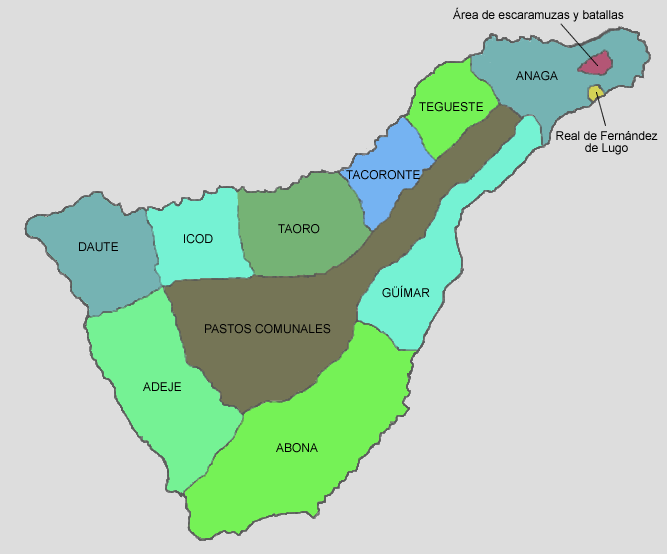
Tenerife prior to the Castilian conquest.

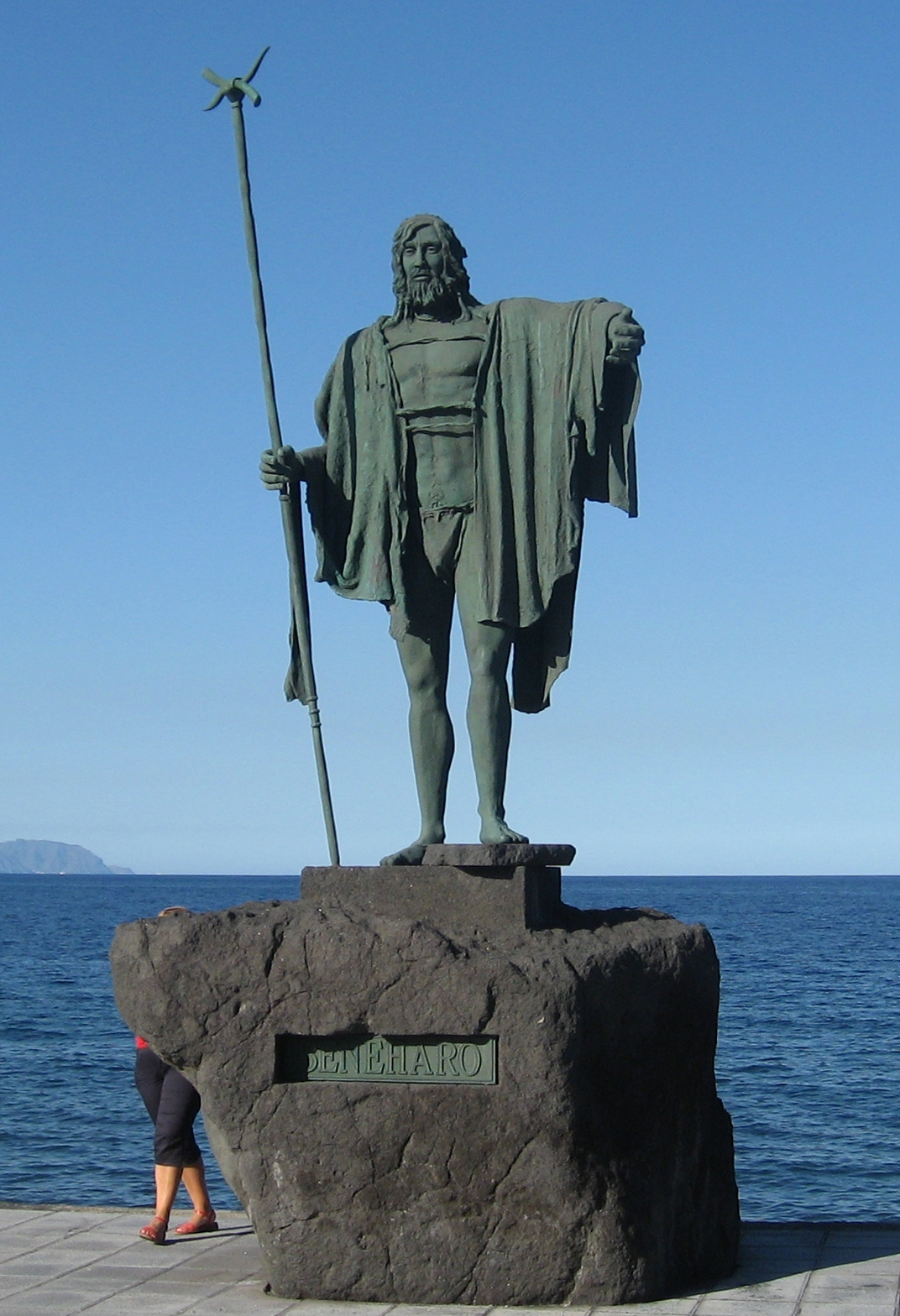
Bronze statue of Beneharo (Candelaria, Tenerife).

Anaga was one of the 9 menceyatos (native Guanche kingdoms) on the island of Tenerife (Canary Islands, Spain) before the arrival of the conquering Spaniards.

The area of the menceyato is now part of the municipalities of Santa Cruz de Tenerife and San Cristóbal de La Laguna. The easternmost kingdom on the island, under mencey Beneharo it fiercely resisted the Spanish conquest.
