= Beneharo =

Guanche king

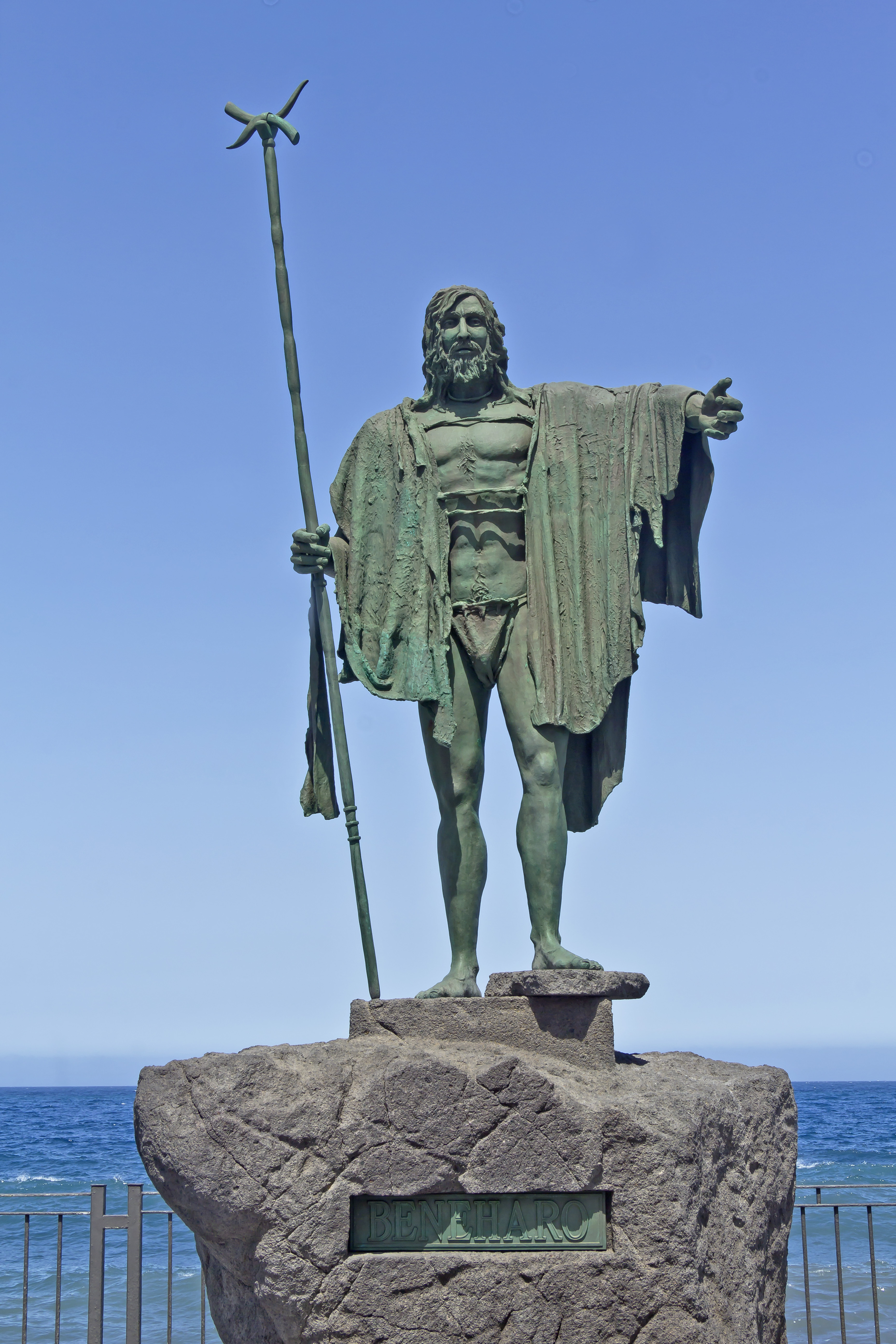
Bronze statue of Beneharo (Candelaria, Tenerife).

Beneharo was a Guanche king of Menceyato de Anaga on the island of Tenerife.

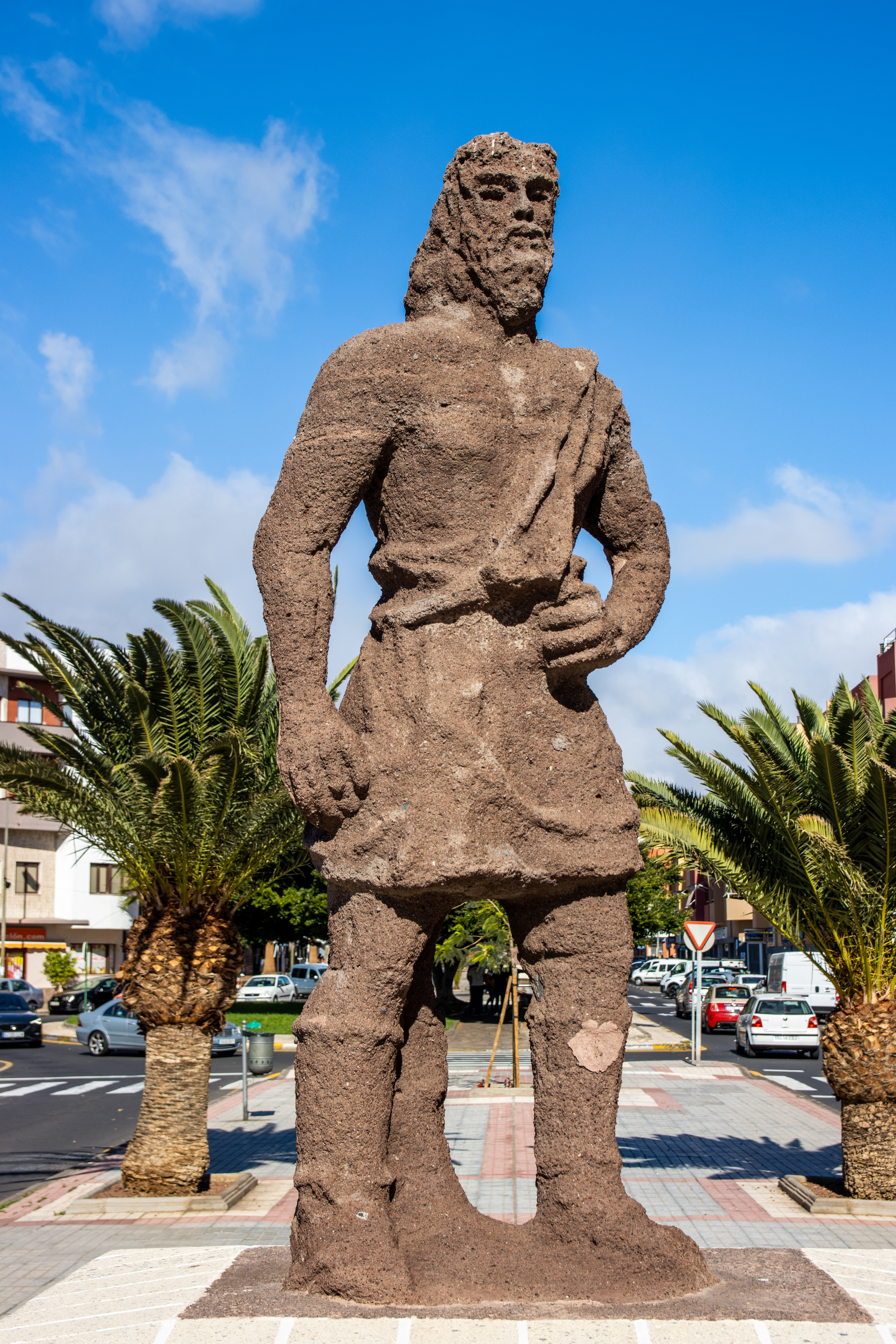
The older stone statue of Beneharo in Candelaria, Tenerife

Beneharo made peace in 1492 with Lope de Salazar, who had been sent by the governor of Gran Canaria Francisco Maldonado. After a slave raid shortly after against the Guanches of Anaga, the mencey withdrew its support to the Europeans although after the landing of Alonso Fernández de Lugo renewed the peace with the Castilians.

A bronze statue of Beneharo is located in Candelaria with the other menceyes Guanches of Tenerife.

== Notes ==
- José Juan Acosta; Félix Rodríguez Lorenzo; Carmelo L. Quintero Padrón, Conquista y Colonización (Santa Cruz de Tenerife: Centro de la Cultura Popular Canaria, 1988), p. 51-2.
- (in Spanish) Batalla de Acentejo
- (in Spanish) 510 Aniversario de la Batalla de Acentejo: La Derrota de un Imperio
