= Domingo Vandewalle =

Spanish explorer and military commander

Domingo Vandewalle (also Domingo Van de Walle de Cervellón, Don Domingo Vandeval) (1720 Santa Cruz de La Palma - 1776, Santa Cruz) was a Spanish explorer and military commander of Las Palmas in the Canary Islands. He is notable for being the first to discover the Guanches engravings of the Belmaco cave in the municipality of Villa de Mazo in 1752.
