= Abora =

Ancestral solar deity of La Palma

Abora is the name of an ancestral solar deity of La Palma (Canary Islands) and a traditional god of the Guanches.

== Supreme being ==
Abora (Ibru) is the name of the supreme being of the religion of the Guanches on the island of La Palma. In Guanche mythology of the island of Tenerife, the supreme god was called Achamán.

== Uses of the name ==
- Reed boats Abora of the German explorer Dominique Görlitz
