= Tibicena =

Mythological creature of the Guanches

A Tibicena, also known as Guacanchas, was a mythological creature of the Guanches, indigenous pre-colonial inhabitants of the Canary Islands. Tibicenas were imagined to be demons or genies who had the bodies of great wild dogs with red eyes, covered by long, black fur. They lived in deep caves inside the mountains.

Some existing caves on the Canary Islands are still referred to as Tibicena lairs, such as "Cueva del Tibicena". According to myth, Tibicenas attacked livestock and persons, particularly at night. Guanche mythology posited Tibicenas as offspring of Guayota (the devil or malignant deity). Inhabitants of Tenerife called them Guacanchas and inhabitants of Gran Canaria called them Tibicenas.

== Sources ==
- Cioranescu, A. (1977)- Galindo A. (1632), Historia de la Conquista de las Siete Islas, Goya, Santa Cruz de Tenerife, p.149
