= Guanches =

Native inhabitants of the Canary Islands

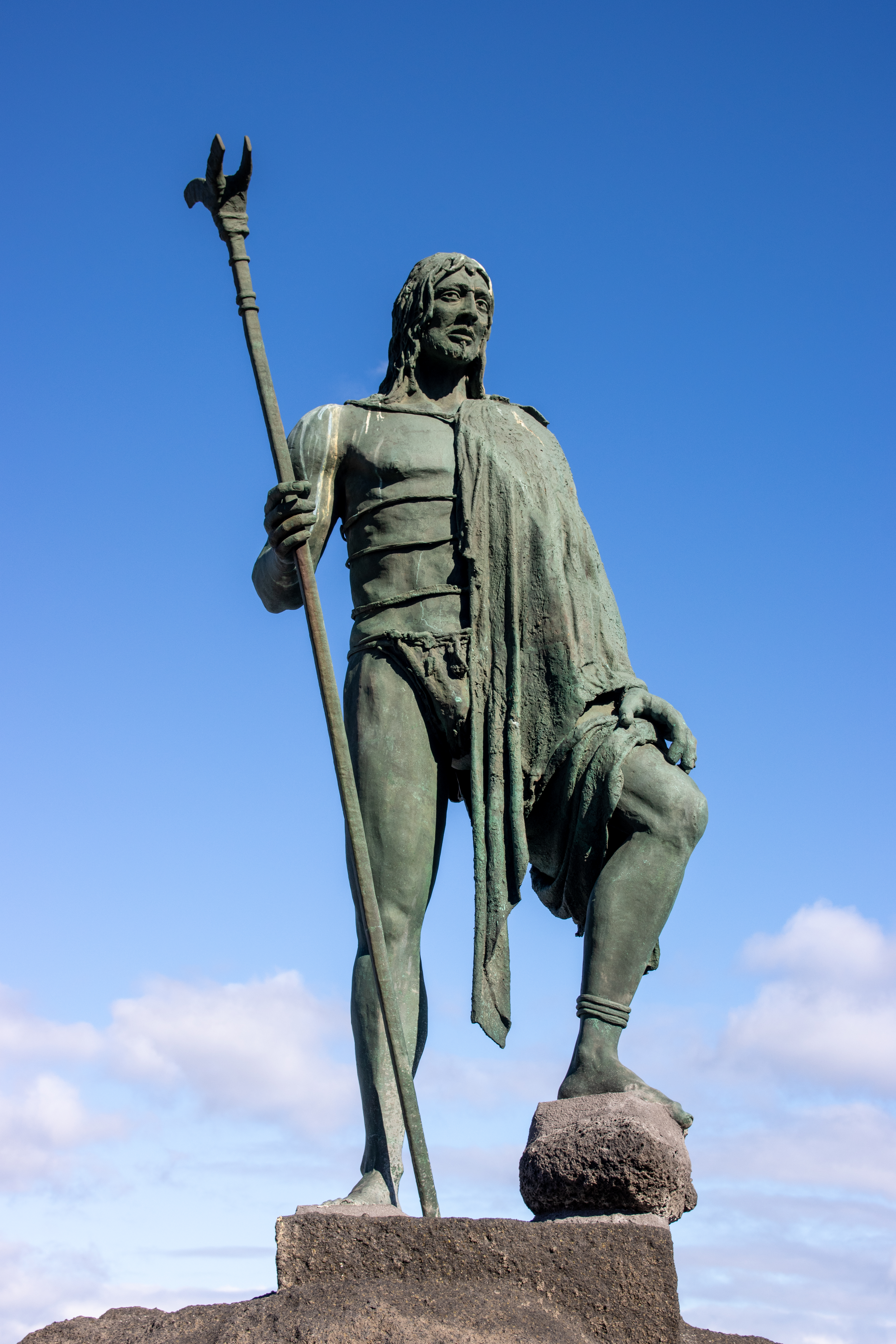
- Statue of Tegueste at Candelaria, Tenerife

Languages
- Guanche (historically)

Religion
- Animism (Guanche mythology)

Related ethnic groups
- Berbers, Canary Islanders

The Guanches were the indigenous inhabitants of the Canary Islands, located in the Atlantic Ocean some 100 kilometres (60 mi) to the west of modern Morocco and the North African coast. The islanders spoke the Guanche language, which is believed to have been related to the Berber languages of mainland North Africa. The language became extinct in the 17th century, several generations after the completion of the conquest of the Canary Islands by the Catholic Monarchs of Spain.

It is believed that the Guanches may have arrived at the archipelago some time in the first millennium BC. The Guanches were the only indigenous people known to have lived in the Macaronesian archipelago region off the coast of north-western Africa before the arrival of Europeans. There is no accepted evidence that the other Macaronesian archipelagos were inhabited. The other island groups are the Cape Verde Islands, Madeira and the Azores.

After the commencement of the Spanish conquest of the Canaries, starting in the early 15th century, many natives were killed by the Spanish or died of exposure to new pathogens during the social disruption. Eventually, any remaining survivors were assimilated into the new Spanish population and associated culture. Elements of their original culture survive within Canarian customs and traditions, such as Silbo (the whistled language of La Gomera Island), as well as some lexicon of Canarian Spanish.

In 2017, the first genome-wide data analysis of the ethnic Guanche confirmed a North African origin, genetically being most similar to ancient North African Berber peoples from the mainland.

== Etymology ==
The native term guanachinet literally translated means "person of Tenerife" (from Guan = person and Achinet = Tenerife). It was modified, according to Juan Núñez de la Peña, by the Castilians into "Guanche". Though etymologically an ancient, Tenerife-specific term, the word Guanche is now used mostly to refer to the pre-Hispanic Indigenous inhabitants of the entire archipelago.

== Historical background ==
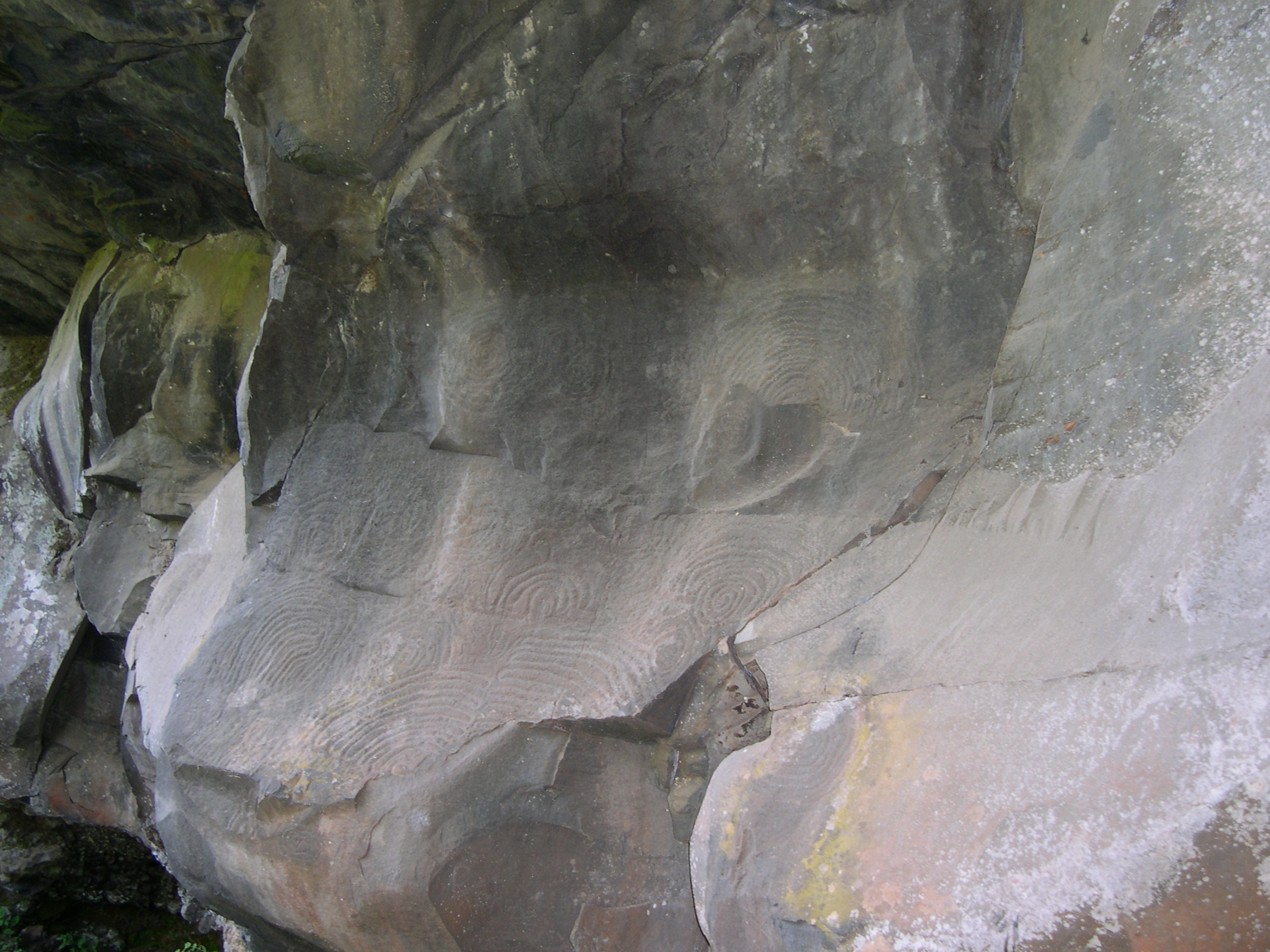
Guanche rock carvings in La Palma

=== Prehistory ===
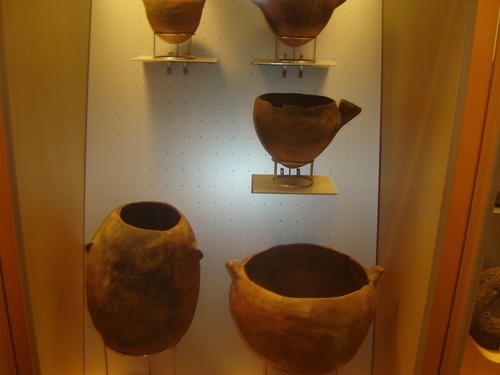
Guanche pottery exhibit (Museo de la Naturaleza y el Hombre, Tenerife).

Genetic and linguistic evidence show that North African peoples made a significant contribution to the aboriginal population of the Canaries, notably, following desertification of the Sahara (post-6000 BC). There are ties between the Guanche language and the Berber languages of North Africa, particularly when comparing numeral systems. Research into the genetics of the Guanche population has led to the conclusion that they share an ancestry with Berber peoples who immigrated from Northwest Africa.

The islands were visited by a number of other peoples and representatives of distant civilizations during recorded history; the Numidians, Phoenicians, and Carthaginians all knew of the islands and made frequent visits, including expeditions dispatched from Mogador by Juba.

Based on Roman artifacts, found on and near the island of Lanzarote, the Romans visited the Canary Islands during their occupation of mainland North Africa between the 1st and 4th centuries AD; the artifacts found show that the Romans engaged in trade with the people of the island. However, there is no evidence of them ever settling on or invading the Canaries. Archaeology of the Canaries seems to reflect diverse levels of technology, with items differing widely from the Neolithic culture that would have been encountered by the Spanish, at the time of their conquest.

Scholars believe that the original settling by humans on the islands likely resulted in the extinction of uniquely-adapted endemic species, such as reptiles and mammals exhibiting insular gigantism; one example is believed to be Canariomys bravoi, the extinct giant rat of Tenerife.

Pliny the Elder, a Roman author and military officer drawing from the accounts of Juba II (ancient King of Mauretania), stated that a Mauretanian expedition to the islands, circa 50 BC, found the ruins of great buildings, albeit with no population to speak of. If this account is accurate, it may suggest that the Guanche were not the only inhabitants, or the first ones; alternatively, this could imply that the Mauretanian expedition did not explore the islands thoroughly.

Tenerife, specifically the archaeological site of the Cave of the Guanches in Icod de los Vinos, has provided evidence of habitation dating to the 6th century BC. This is based on the analyses of ceramics and pottery artifacts that were found inside the cave.

Historically, the Guanche were the first peoples of Tenerife. Their population seems to have lived in relative obscurity and isolation up until the time of Castilian conquest (ca. the 14th century); Genoese, Portuguese, and Castilian ships may have visited the archipelago earlier for trade purposes, from the second half of the 8th century onward. The Spanish gradually applied the term "Guanche" to the indigenous populations of all seven Canary Islands, with those living on Tenerife being the most important or powerful.

According to European chroniclers, the Guanche did not possess a system of writing at the time of conquest; their potential writing system may have fallen into disuse, or aspects of it were simply overlooked by the colonists. Inscriptions, glyphs, rock paintings and carvings are all quite abundant throughout the archipelago. Petroglyphs attributed to other Mediterranean civilizations have also been found on some of the islands. In 1752, Domingo Vandewalle, a military governor of Las Palmas, ventured to investigate the petroglyphs. Aquilino Padron, a priest at Las Palmas, catalogued inscriptions at El Julan, La Candía and La Caleta, all on El Hierro. In 1878, Dr. René Verneau discovered rock carvings in the ravines of Las Balos that resembled Libyan or Numidian script, dating from the time of Roman occupation or earlier. In other locations, Libyco-Berber script has been identified.

=== Pre-conquest exploration ===
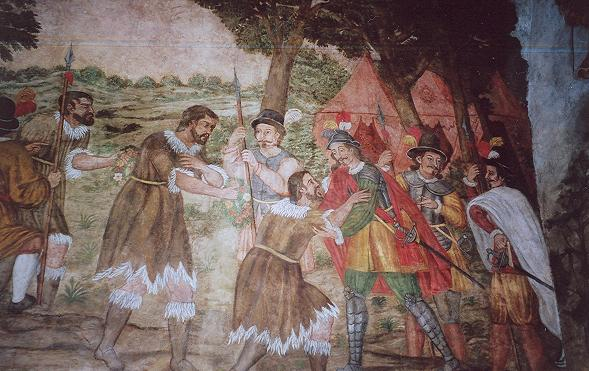
Guanche kings of Tenerife surrendering to Alonso Fernández de Lugo

The geographic accounts of Pliny the Elder and of Strabo mention the Fortunate Isles but do not report anything about their populations.

An account of the Guanche population may have been made around AD 1150 by the Arab geographer Muhammad al-Idrisi in the Nuzhatul Mushtaq, a book he wrote for King Roger II of Sicily. Al-Idrisi reports a journey in the Atlantic Ocean made by the Mugharrarin ("the adventurers"), a family of Andalusian seafarers from Lisbon. The only surviving version of this book, kept at the Bibliothèque Nationale de France, and first translated by Pierre Amédée Jaubert, reports that, after having reached an area of "sticky and stinking waters," the Mugharrarin moved back and first reached an uninhabited Island (Madeira or Hierro), where they found "a huge quantity of sheep, which its meat was bitter and inedible". They "continued southward" and reached another island where they were soon surrounded by barks and brought to "a village whose inhabitants were often fair haired with long and flaxen hair and the women of a rare beauty." Among the villagers, one spoke Arabic and asked them where they came from. Then the king of the village ordered them to bring villagers back to the continent. There they were surprised to be welcomed by Berbers.

Apart from the marvelous and fanciful content of this history, this account suggests that the Guanche had sporadic contacts with populations from the mainland. Al-Idrisi described the Guanche men as tall and of a reddish-brown complexion.

During the 14th century, the Guanche are presumed to have had other contacts with Balearic seafarers from Spain. This is based on the Balearic artifacts found on several of the Canary Islands.

=== Castilian conquest ===
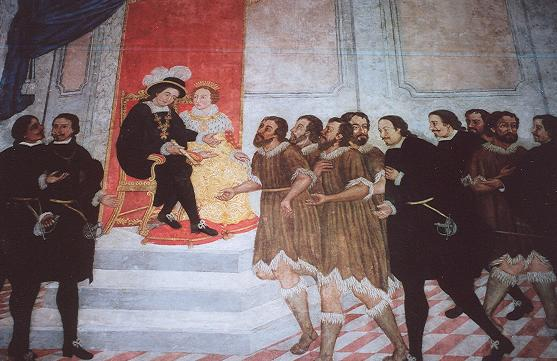
Alonso Fernández de Lugo presenting the captured Guanche kings of Tenerife to Ferdinand and Isabella

The Castilian conquest of the Canary Islands began in 1402, with the expedition of Jean de Béthencourt and Gadifer de la Salle to the island of Lanzarote. Gadifer invaded Lanzarote and Fuerteventura.

The other five islands fought back. El Hierro and the Bimbache population were the next to fall, then La Gomera, Gran Canaria, La Palma and in 1496, Tenerife.

In the First Battle of Acentejo (31 May 1494), called La Matanza (the slaughter), Guanche ambushed the Castilians in a valley and killed many. Only one in five of the Castilians survived, including the leader, Alonso Fernandez de Lugo.

Lugo later returned to the island with the alliance of the kings of the southern part of the island. He defeated the Guanches in the Battle of Aguere. The northern Menceyatos or provinces fell after the Second Battle of Acentejo with the defeat of the successor of Bencomo, Bentor, Mencey of Taoro—what is now the Orotava Valley—in 1496.

Various scholars have used the term "genocide" to describe the conquest of the Canary Islands. Mohamed Adhikari argues that the Canary Islands were the scene of "Europe's first overseas settler colonial genocide," and that the mass killing and enslavement of natives, along with forced deportation, sexual violence and confiscation of land and children constituted an attempt to "destroy in whole" the Guanche people. The tactics used in the Canary Islands in the 15th century served as a model for the Iberian colonisation of the Americas.

== Language ==
The native Guanche language is now known only through a few sentences and individual words, supplemented by several placenames. Many modern linguists propose that it belongs to the Berber branch of the Afroasiatic languages.

However, while there are recognizable Berber words (particularly with regards to agriculture) within the Guanche language, no Berber grammatical inflections have been identified; there is a large stock of vocabulary that does not bear any resemblance to Berber whatsoever.

Other strong similarities to the Berber languages are reflected in their counting system, while some authors suggest the Canarian branch would be a sister branch to the surviving continental Berber languages, splitting off during the early development of the language family and before the terminus post quem for the origin of Proto-Berber.

What remains of their language, Guanche—a few expressions, vocabulary words and the proper names of ancient chieftains, still borne by certain families—exhibits positive similarities with the Berber languages. The first reliable account of the Guanche language was provided by the Genoese explorer Nicoloso da Recco in 1341, with a translation of numbers used by the islanders.

== System of beliefs ==
=== Religion and mythology ===
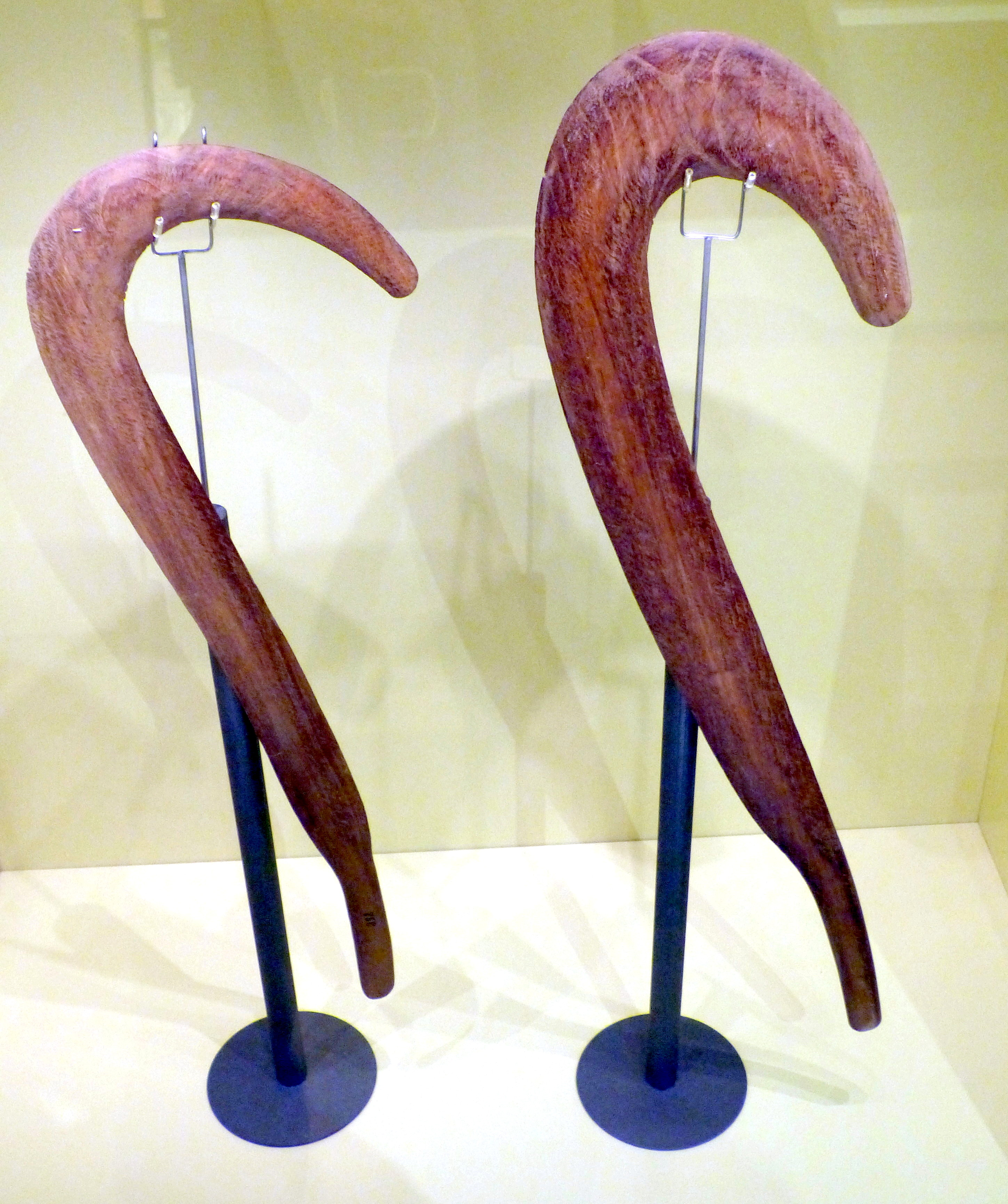
Chieftains' batons from La Palma

Little is known of the religion of the Guanches. There was a general belief in a supreme being, called Achamán in Tenerife, Acoran in Gran Canaria, Eraoranhan in Hierro, and Abora in La Palma. The women of El Hierro worshipped a goddess called Moneiba. According to tradition, the male and female gods lived in mountains, from which they descended to hear the prayers of the people. On other islands, the natives venerated the sun, moon, earth, and stars. A belief in an evil spirit was general. The demon of Tenerife was called Guayota and lived at the peak of Teide volcano, which was the hell called Echeyde; in Tenerife and Gran Canaria, the minor demons took the form of wild black woolly dogs called Jucanchas in the first and Tibicenas in the latter, which lived in deep caves of the mountains, emerging at night to attack livestock and human beings.

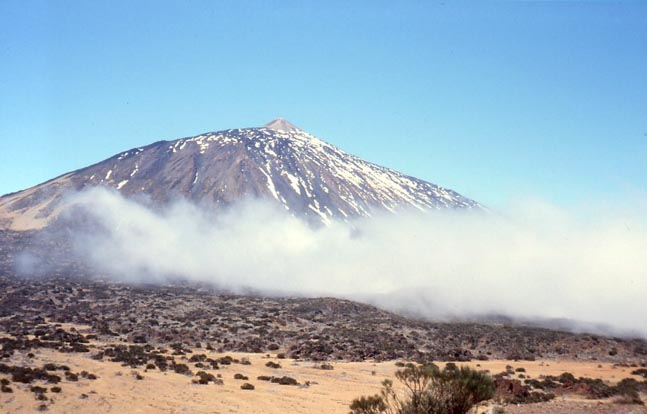
Mount Teide on Tenerife

In Tenerife, Magec (god of the Sun) and Chaxiraxi (the goddess mother) were also worshipped. In times of drought, the Guanches drove their flocks to consecrated grounds, where the lambs were separated from their mothers in the belief that their plaintive bleating would melt the heart of the Great Spirit. During the religious feasts, hostilities were held in abeyance, from war to personal quarrels.

Idols have been found in the islands, including the Idol of Tara (Museo Canario, Las Palmas de Gran Canaria) and the Guatimac (Museum Archaeological of Puerto de la Cruz in Tenerife). But many more figures have been found in the rest of the archipelago.

Most researchers agree that the Guanches performed their worship in the open, under sacred trees such as pine or drago, or near sacred mountains such as Mount Teide, which was believed to be the abode of the devil Guayota. Mount Teide was sacred to the aboriginal Guanches and since 2007 is a World Heritage Site. But sometimes the Guanches also performed worship in caves, as in "Cave of Achbinico" in Tenerife. Until the 20th century, there were in the Canary Islands (especially in northern Tenerife) individuals called "Animeros." They were similar to healers and mystics with a syncretic beliefs combining elements of the Guanche religion and Christianity. As in other countries close to the islands (e.g. marabouts from the Maghreb), the Animeros were considered "persons blessed by God."

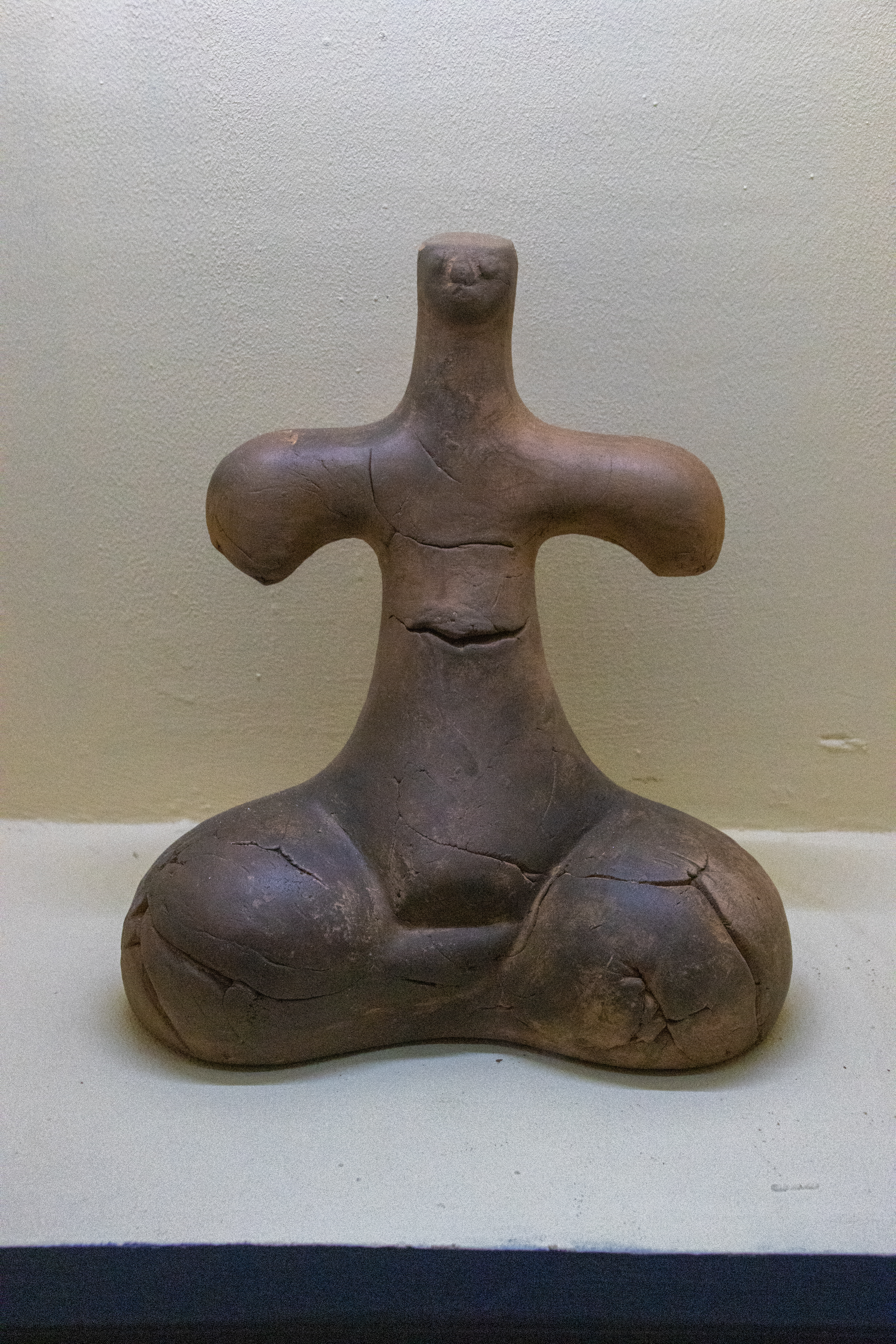
Guanche idol in the Museo Guanche, Tenerife

Principal gods of Tenerife
God	Role
Achamán	The supreme god of the Guanches on the island of Tenerife; he is the father god and creator.
Chaxiraxi	The native Guanche goddess known as "supporter of he who holds the world [Abreu (ca. 1590, III, 13) d. 1676: 90r]."
Achguayaxerax/Xerax or Chijoraji	A divine child, son of Chaxiraxi and "supporter of Heaven and Earth." [Abreu (ca. 1590, III, 13) d. 1676: 90r].
Magec	The god of the Sun and the light, and also thought to be one of the principal divinities.
Achuguayo	The "Supreme Being," according to oral tradition. [Bethencourt Alfonso (1911) 1994b: 260].
Achuhucanac	Rain god, identified with the supreme god (Achamán).
Guayota	The principal malignant deity and Achamán's adversary, who dwells inside Mount Teide.

Mythical beings
Being	Role
Maxios	Benevolent minor gods or genies; domestic spirits and guardians of specific places.
Tibicenas	Demons in the form of black dogs, these were children of Guayota, the malignant deity.

=== Indigenous priests ===
The Guanches had priests or shamans who were connected with the gods and ordained hierarchically:

Title	Territorial jurisdiction	Definition
Guadameñe or Guañameñe	Tenerife	spiritual advisers to the Menceyes (indigenous monarchs) and worship leaders.
Faykan or Faicán	Gran Canaria	spiritual and religious people also in charge of worship.
Maguadas or Arimaguadas	Tenerife Gran Canaria	women priestesses dedicated to worship. They took part in some rituals.
Kankus	Tenerife	priests responsible for the worship of the ancestor spirits and Maxios (minor gods or genies).

=== Festivities ===
Beñesmen or Beñesmer was a festival of the agricultural calendar of the Guanches (the Guanche new year) to be held after the gathering of crops devoted to Chaxiraxi (on August 15). In this event the Guanches shared milk, gofio, sheep or goat meat. At the present time, this coincides with the pilgrimage to the Basilica of the Virgin of Candelaria (Patron of Canary Islands).

Among the cultural events are significant traces of aboriginal traditions at the holidays and in the current Romería Relief in Güímar (Tenerife) and the lowering of the Rama, in Agaete (Gran Canaria).

=== Funerals and mummies ===
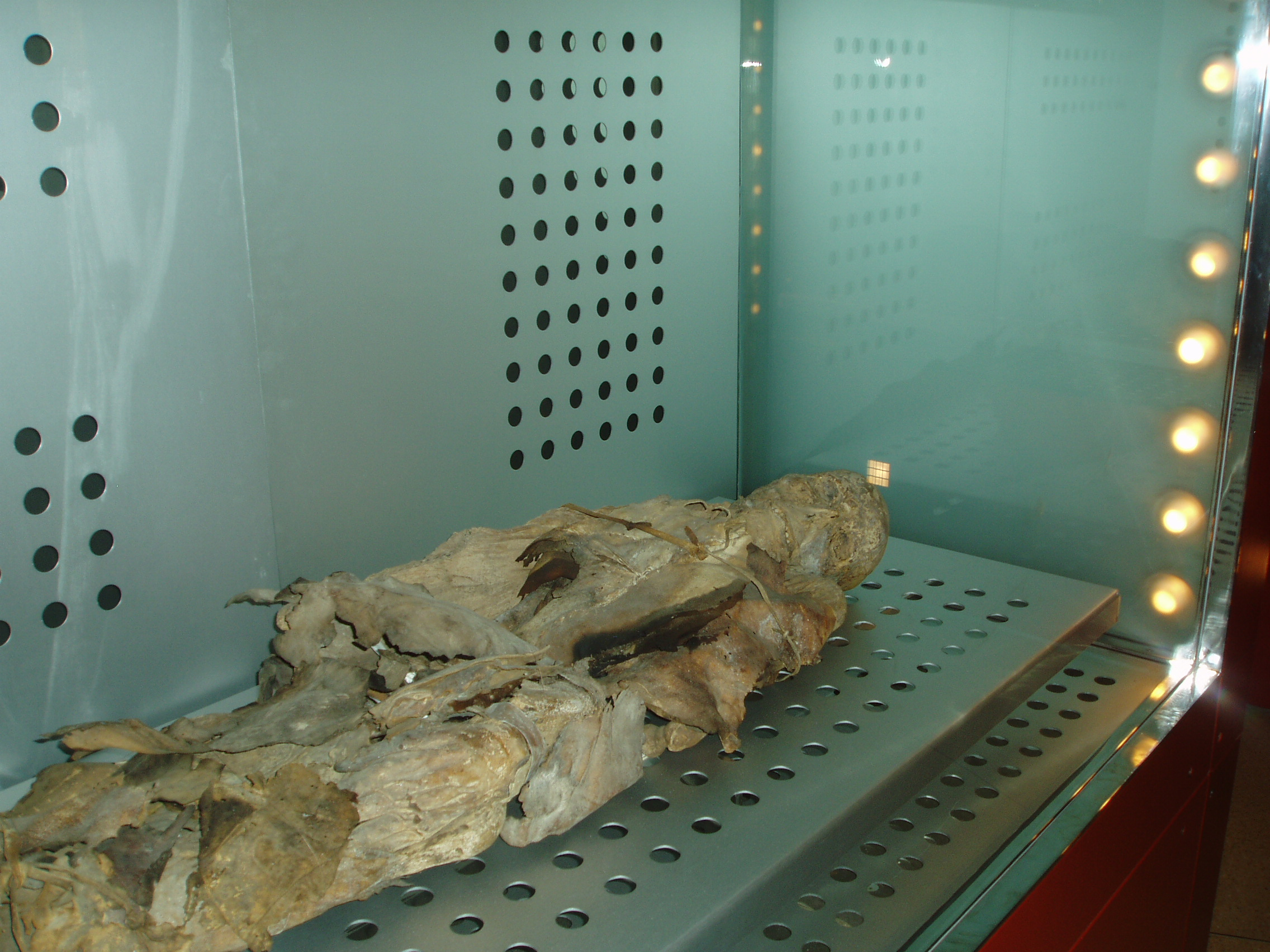
Mummy of San Andrés, in the Museo de la Naturaleza y el Hombre (Tenerife, Canary Islands)

Mummification was not commonly practiced throughout the islands but was highly developed on Tenerife in particular. In Gran Canaria there is currently a debate on the true nature of the mummies of the ancient inhabitants of the island, as researchers point out that there was no real intention to mummify the deceased and that the good conservation of some of them is due rather to environmental factors. In La Palma they were preserved by these environmental factors and in La Gomera, and El Hierro the existence of mummification is not verified. In Lanzarote and Fuerteventura this practice is ruled out.

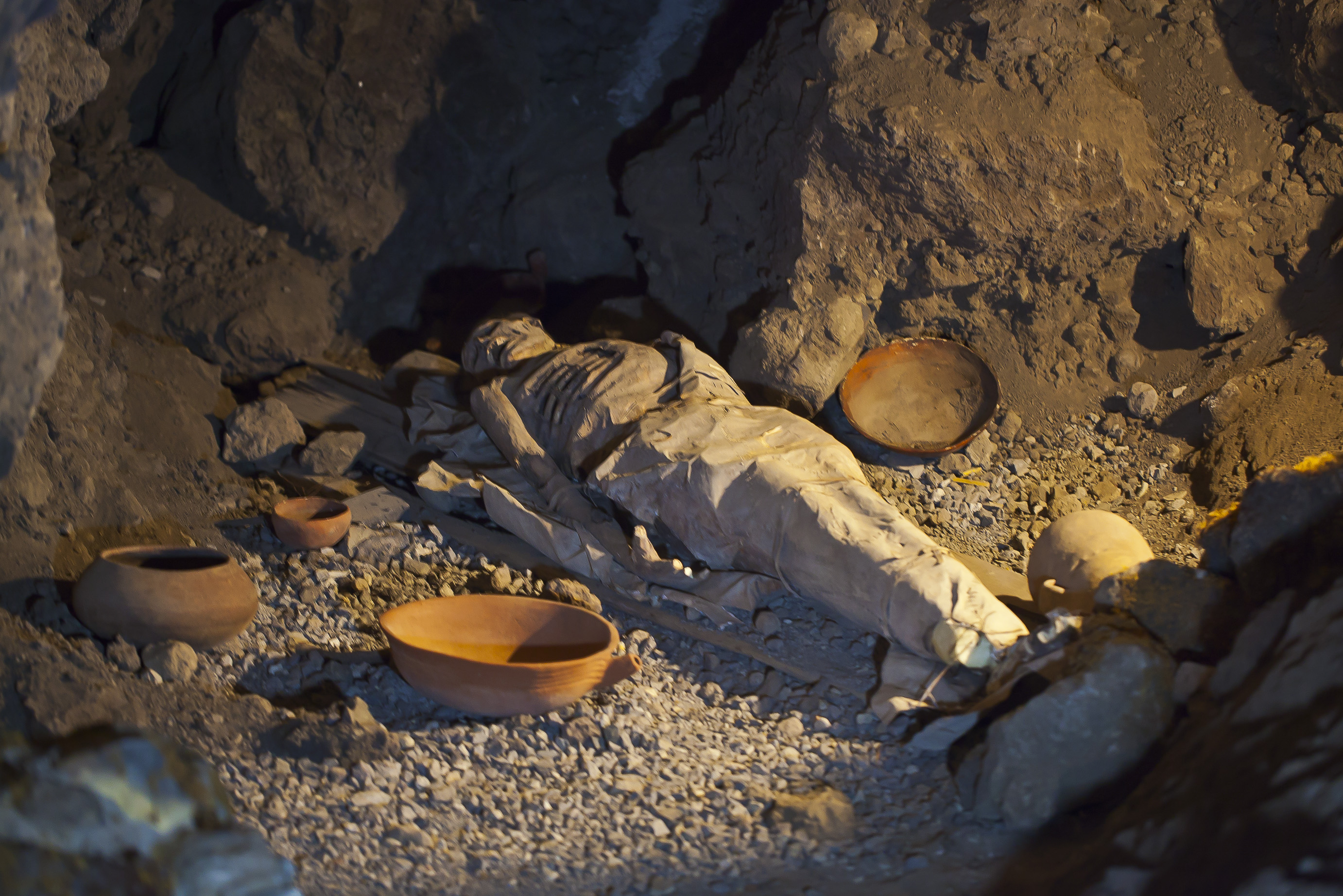
Replica of a mummy burial in the cave of Parque del Drago, Tenerife

The Guanches embalmed their dead; many mummies have been found in an extreme state of desiccation, each weighing not more than 3 kg (7 lb). Two almost inaccessible caves in a vertical rock by the shore 5 km (3 mi) from Santa Cruz on Tenerife are said still to contain remains. The process of embalming seems to have varied. In Gran Canaria, the corpse was simply wrapped in goat or sheep skins, while in Tenerife a resinous substance was used to preserve the body, which was then placed in a cave difficult to access, or buried under a tumulus. The work of embalming was reserved for a special class, with women tending to female corpses, and men for the male ones. Embalming seems not to have been universal.

In the Museo de la Naturaleza y el Hombre (Santa Cruz de Tenerife) mummies of original inhabitants of the Canary Islands are displayed.

In 1933, the largest Guanche necropolis of the Canary Islands was found, at Uchova in the municipality of San Miguel de Abona in the south of the island of Tenerife. This cemetery was almost completely looted; it is estimated to have contained between 60 and 74 mummies.

=== Sacrifices ===
Although little is known about this practice among them, it has been shown that they performed both animal sacrifices and human sacrifices.

In Tenerife during the summer solstice, the Guanches killed livestock and threw them into a fire as an offering to the gods. Bethencourt Alfonso has claimed that goat kids were tied by the legs, alive, to a stake so that they could be heard bleating by the gods. It is likely that animals were also sacrificed on the other islands.

As for human sacrifices, in Tenerife it was the custom to throw a living child from the Punta de Rasca at sunrise at the summer solstice. Sometimes these children came from all parts of the island, even from remote areas of Punta de Rasca. It follows that it was a common custom of the island. On this island sacrificing other human victims associated with the death of the king, where adult men rushed to the sea are also known. Embalmers who produced the Guanche mummies also had a habit of throwing themselves into the sea one year after the king's death.

Bones of children mixed with lambs and kids were found in Gran Canaria, and in Tenerife amphorae have been found with remains of children inside. This suggests a different kind of ritual infanticide than those who were thrown overboard.

Child sacrifice has been seen in other cultures, especially in the Mediterranean—Carthage (now Tunisia), Ugarit in what is now Syria, Cyprus and Crete.

== Political system ==
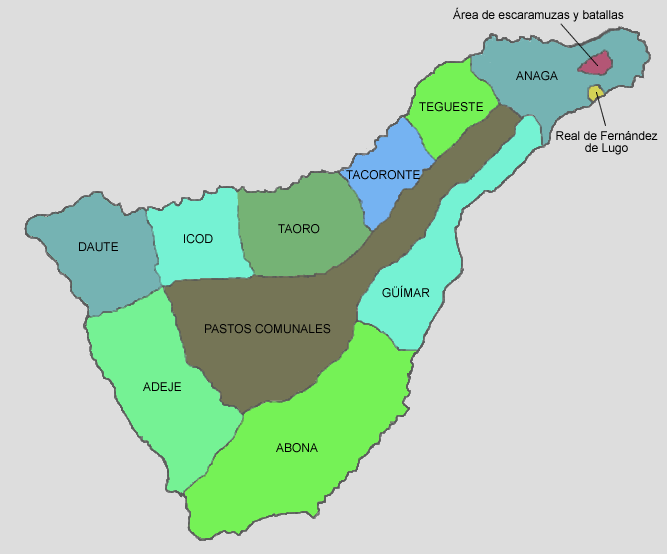
Tenerife prior to the Castilian invasion

The political and social institutions of the Guanches varied. In some islands like Gran Canaria, hereditary autocracy by matrilineality prevailed, in others the government was elective. In Tenerife all the land belonged to the kings who leased it to their subjects. In Gran Canaria, suicide was regarded as honorable, and whenever a new king was installed, one of his subjects willingly honored the occasion by throwing himself over a precipice. In some islands, polyandry was practised; in others they were monogamous. Insult of a woman by an armed man was allegedly a capital offense. Anyone accused of a crime had to attend a public trial in Tagoror, a public court where those prosecuted were sentenced after a trial.

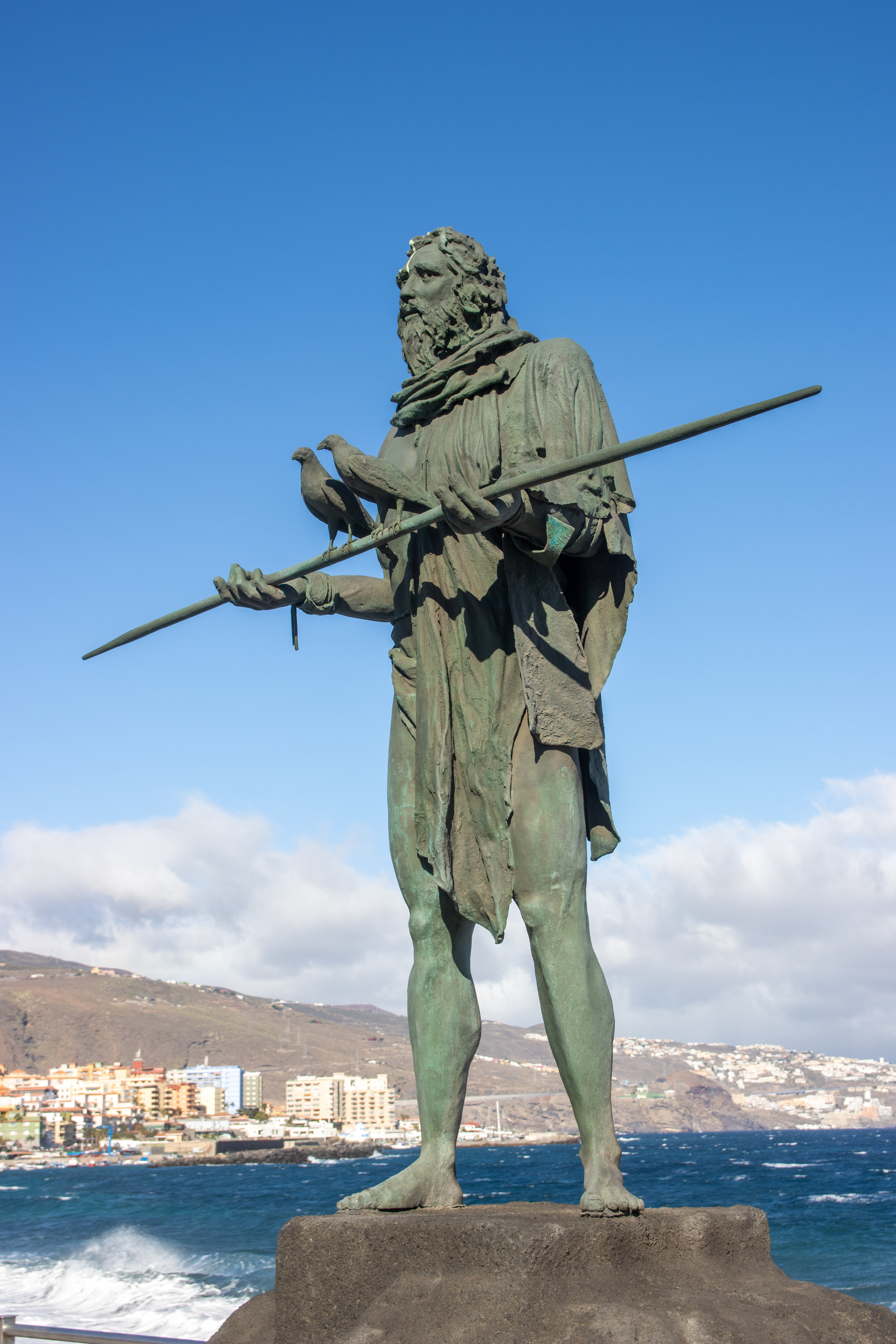
A statue of the Guanche Mencey Añaterve in Candelaria, Tenerife.

The island of Tenerife was divided into nine small kingdoms (menceyatos), each ruled by a king or Mencey. The Mencey was the ultimate ruler of the kingdom, and at times, meetings were held between the various kings. When the Castilians invaded the Canary Islands, the southern kingdoms joined the Castilian invaders on the promise of the richer lands of the north; the Castilians betrayed them after ultimately securing victory at the Battles of Aguere and Acentejo.

=== Kings (Menceys) of Tenerife ===
- Acaimo or Acaymo of Menceyato de Tacoronte
- Adjona of Menceyato de Abona
- Añaterve of Menceyato de Güímar
- Bencomo of Menceyato de Taoro
- Beneharo of Menceyato de Anaga
- Pelicar of Menceyato de Adeje
- Pelinor of Menceyato de Icode
- Romen of Menceyato de Daute
- Tegueste of Menceyato de Tegueste

In Tenerife, the grand Mencey Tinerfe and his father Sunta governed the unified island, which afterwards was divided into nine kingdoms by the children of Tinerfe.

The middle of Tenerife consisted of communal pastures (pastos comunales, comunales). These lands historically supported the traditional practice of trashumance - the seasonal grazing of livestock between coastal lowlands and the high-altitude volcanic pastures of Las Cañadas del Teide.

== Clothes and weapons ==
Guanches wore garments made from goat skins or woven from plant fibers called Tamarcos, which have been found in the tombs of Tenerife. They had a taste for ornaments and necklaces of wood, bone and shells, worked in different designs. Beads of baked earth, cylindrical and of all shapes, with smooth or polished surfaces, mostly colored black and red, were fairly common. Dr. René Verneau suggested that the objects the Castilians referred to as pintaderas, baked clay seal-shaped objects, were used as vessels for painting the body in various colours. They manufactured rough pottery, mostly without decorations, or ornamented by making fingernail indentations.

Guanche weapons adapted to the insular environment (using wood, bone, obsidian and stone as primary materials), with later influences from medieval European weaponry. Basic armaments in several of the islands included javelins of 1 to 2 m in length (known as Banot on Tenerife); round, polished stones; spears; maces (common in Gran Canaria and Tenerife, and known as Magado and Sunta, respectively); and shields (small in Tenerife and human-sized in Gran Canaria, where they were known as Tarja, made of Drago wood and painted with geometric shapes). After the arrival of the Europeans, Guanche nobility from Gran Canaria were known to wield large wooden swords (larger than the European two-handed type) called Magido, which were said to be very effective against both infantrymen and cavalry. Weaponry made of wood was hardened with fire. These armaments were commonly complemented with an obsidian knife known as Tabona.

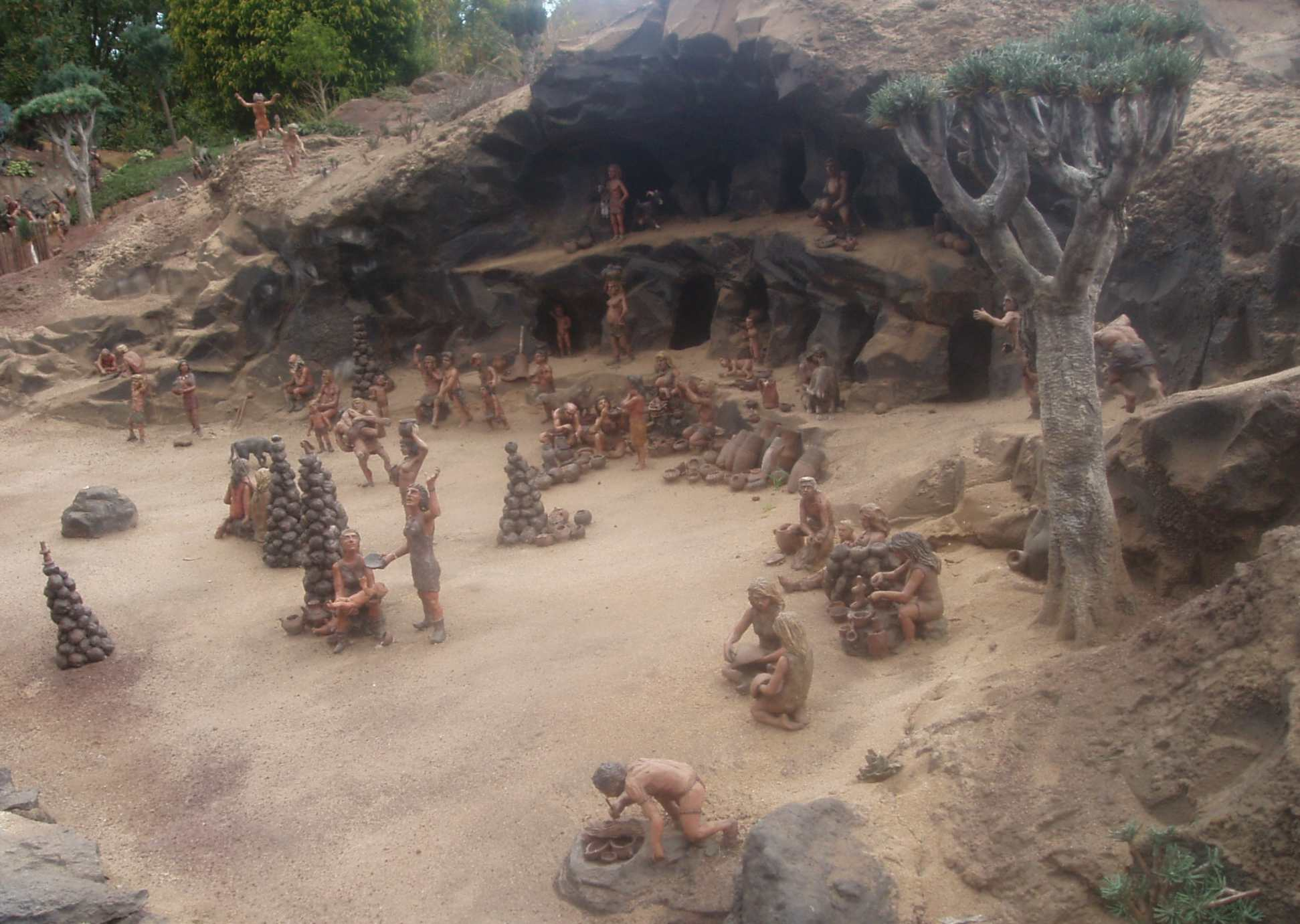
Reconstruction of a Guanche settlement of Tenerife

Dwellings were situated in natural or artificial caves in the mountains. In areas where cave dwellings were not feasible, they built small round houses and, according to the Castilians, practiced crude fortification.

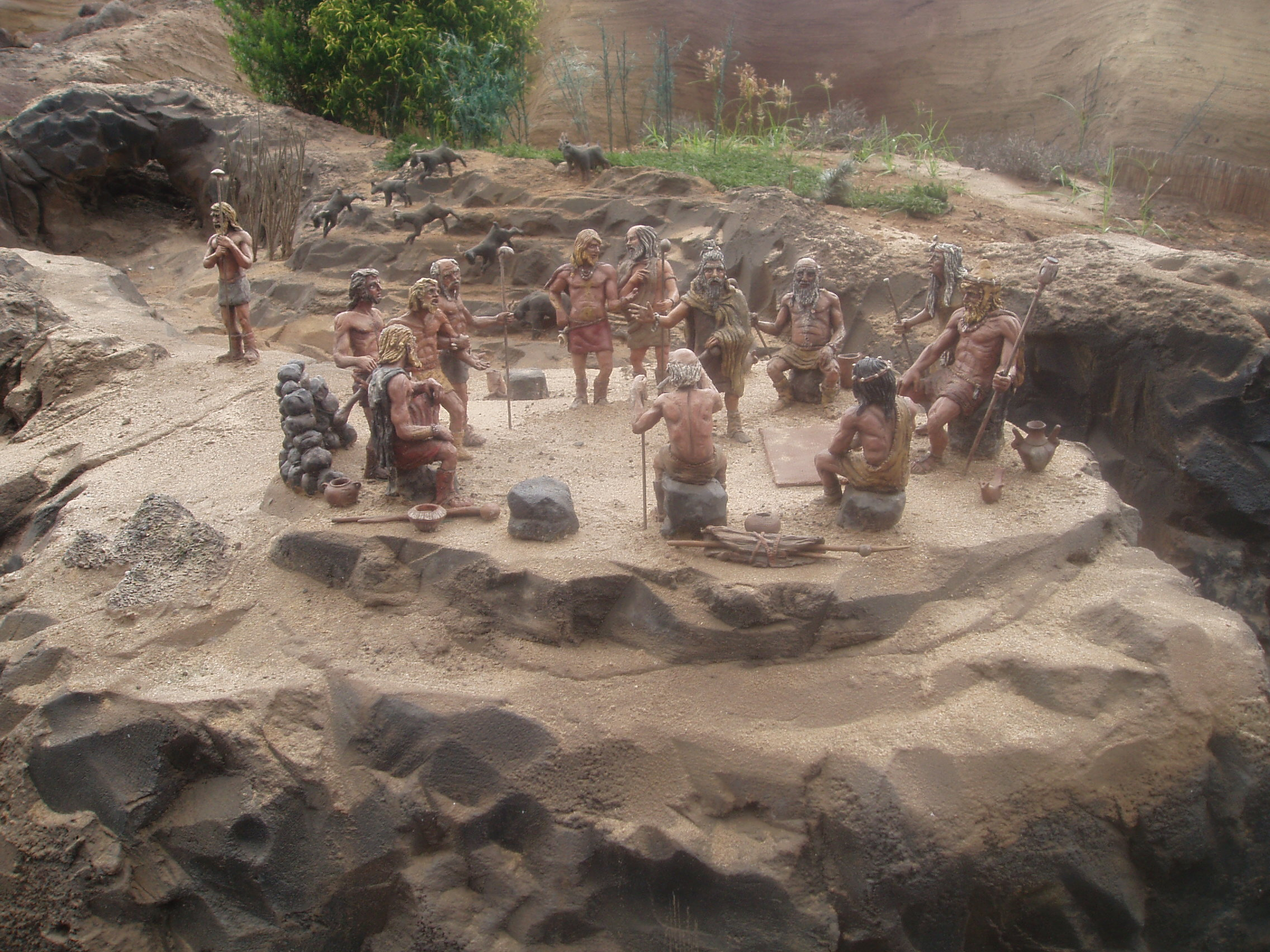
The Guanches on Tenerife

Presumed Guanche names of the Canary Islands
Spanish	Guanche
Tenerife	Achinech
Tenerife	Achineche
Tenerife	Asensen
La Gomera	Gomera
La Gomera	Gomahara
La Palma	Benahoare
El Hierro	Eseró
El Hierro	Heró
Gran Canaria	Tamaran
Lanzarote	Titerogakaet
Lanzarote	Titeroigatra
Fuerteventura	Maxorata
Fuerteventura	Erbania
Fuerteventura	Erbani

== Gallery ==
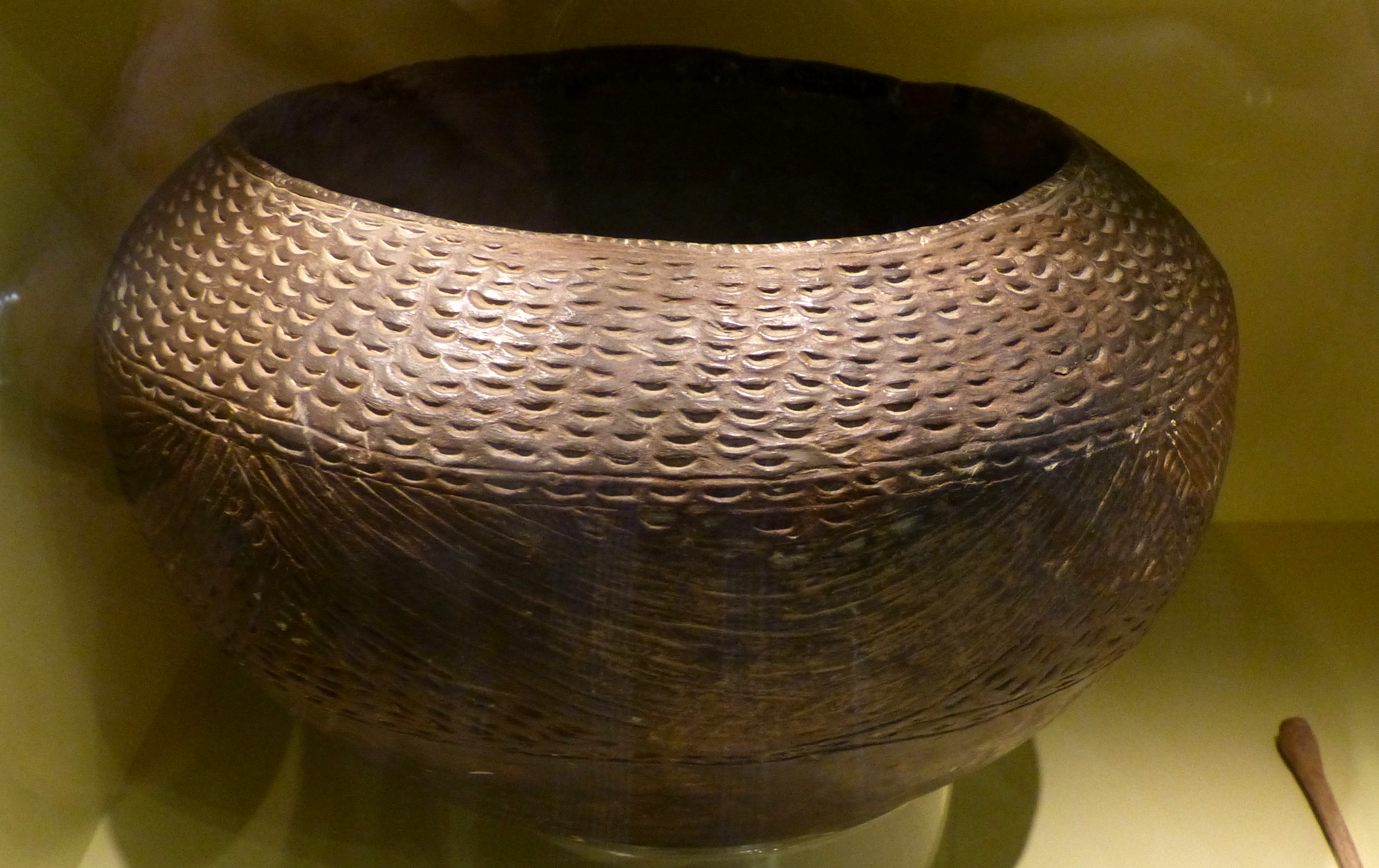
Pottery

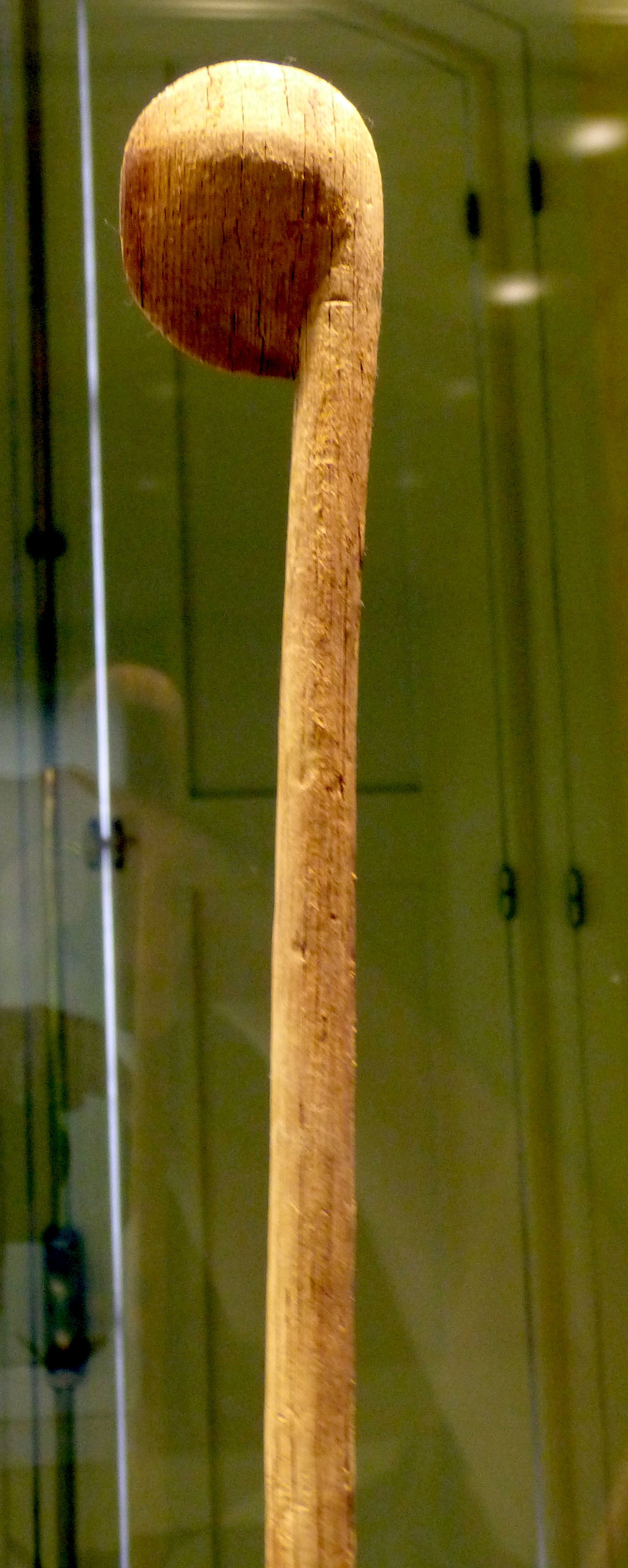
Mencey baton

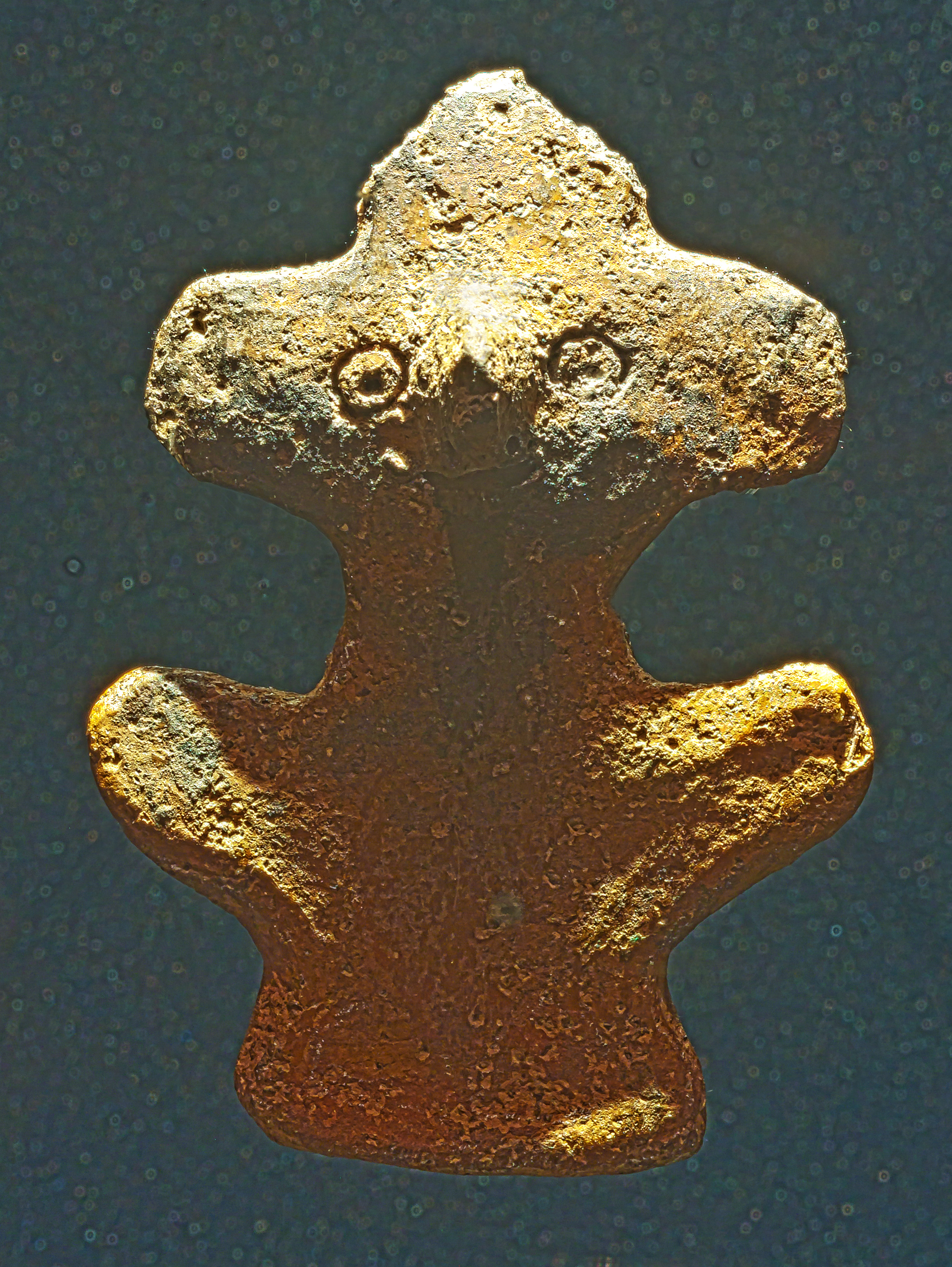
Guatimac idol

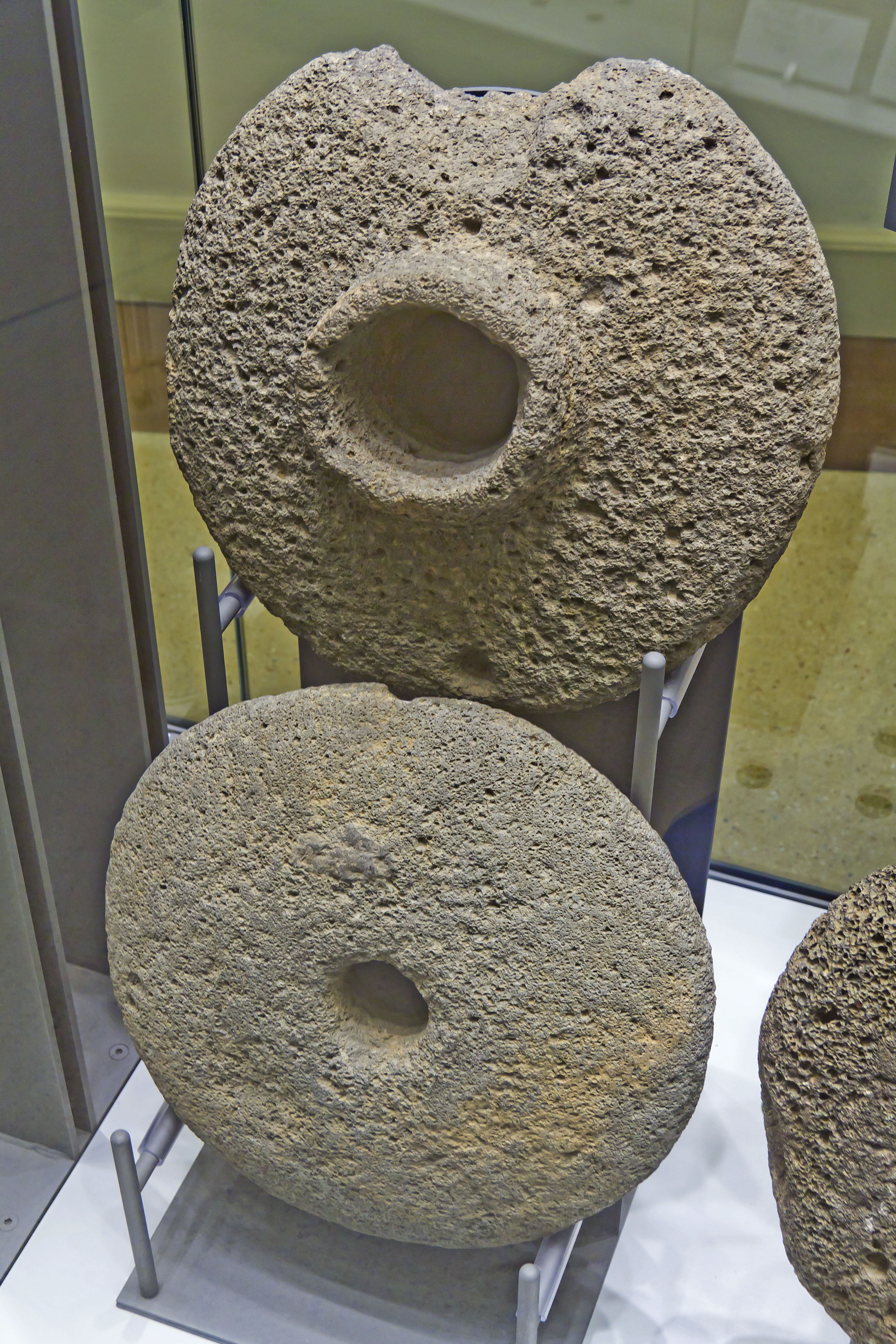
Stone artefacts

== Genetics ==
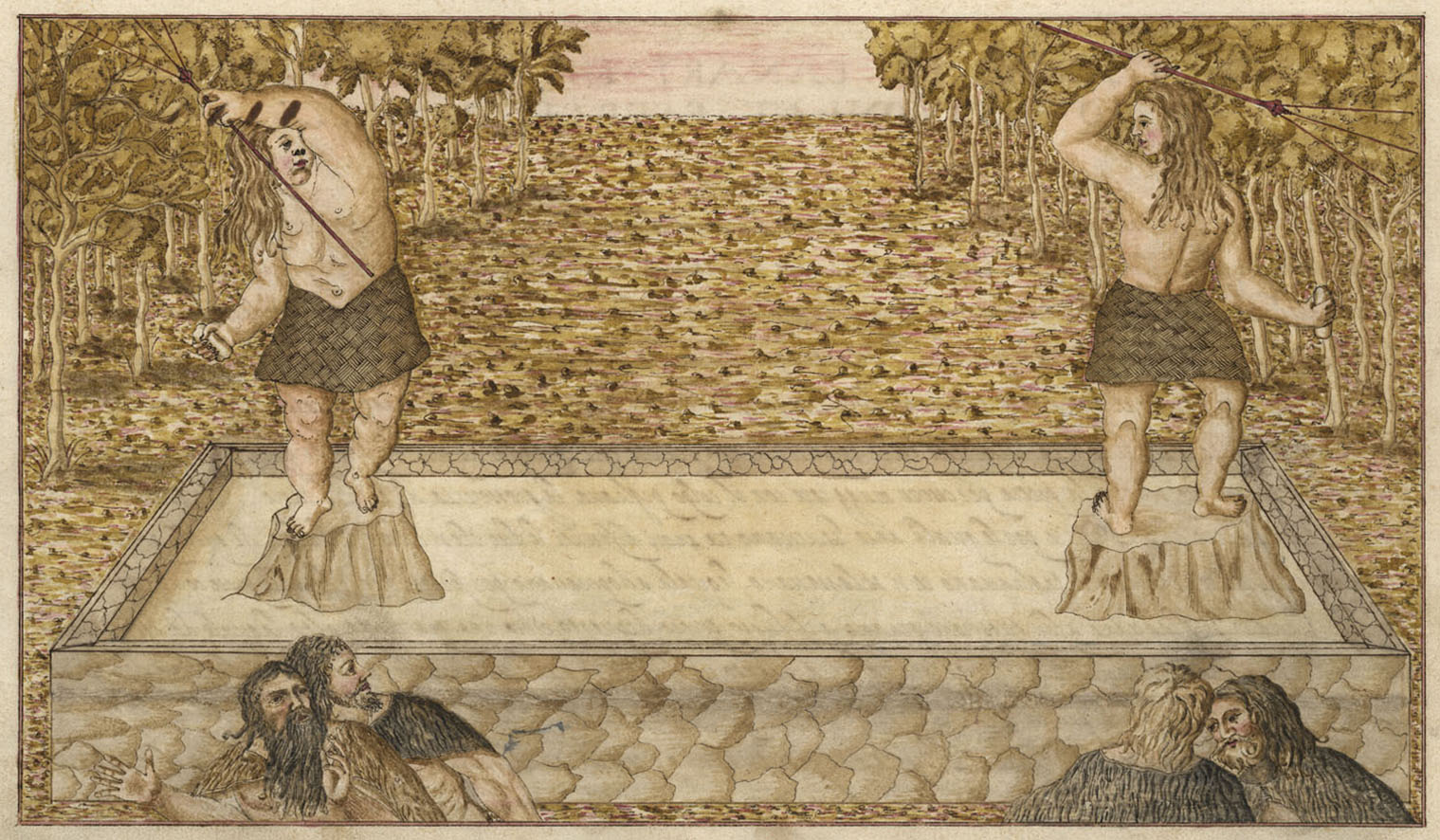
Painting of Guanche warriors of Grand Canaria by Leonardo Torriani, 1592

Maca-Meyer et al. 2003 extracted 71 samples of mtDNA from Guanches buried at numerous Canary Islands (c. 1000 AD). The examined Guanches were found to have closest genetic affinities to modern Moroccan Berbers, Canary Islanders and Spaniards. They carried a significantly high amount of the maternal haplogroup U6b1. U6b1 is found at very low frequencies in North Africa today, and it was suggested that later developments have significantly altered the Berber gene pool. The authors of the study suggested that the Guanches were descended from migrants from mainland North Africa related to the Berbers, and that the Guanches contributed 42–73% to the maternal gene pool of modern Canary Islanders.

Fregel et al. 2009a extracted 30 samples of Y-DNA from Guanches of the Canary Islands. These belonged to the paternal haplogroups E1a*, (3.33%), E1b1b1a* (23.33%), E1b1b1b* (26.67%), I* (6.67%), J1* (16.67%), K*, P* (3.33%), and R1b1b2 (10.00%). E1a*, E1b1b1a* and E1b1b1b* are common lineages among Berbers, and their high frequency among the Guanches were considered evidence that they were migrants from North Africa. R1b1b2 and I* are very common in lineages in Europe, and their moderate frequency among the examined Guanche males was suggested to have been a result of prehistoric gene flow from Europe into the region across the Mediterranean. It was found that Guanche males contributed less to the gene pool of modern Canary Islanders than Guanche females (as would be expected from the extremely bloody conquest of the islands). Haplogroups typical among the Guanche have been found at high frequencies in Latin America, suggesting that descendants of the Guanche played an active role in the Spanish colonization of the Americas.

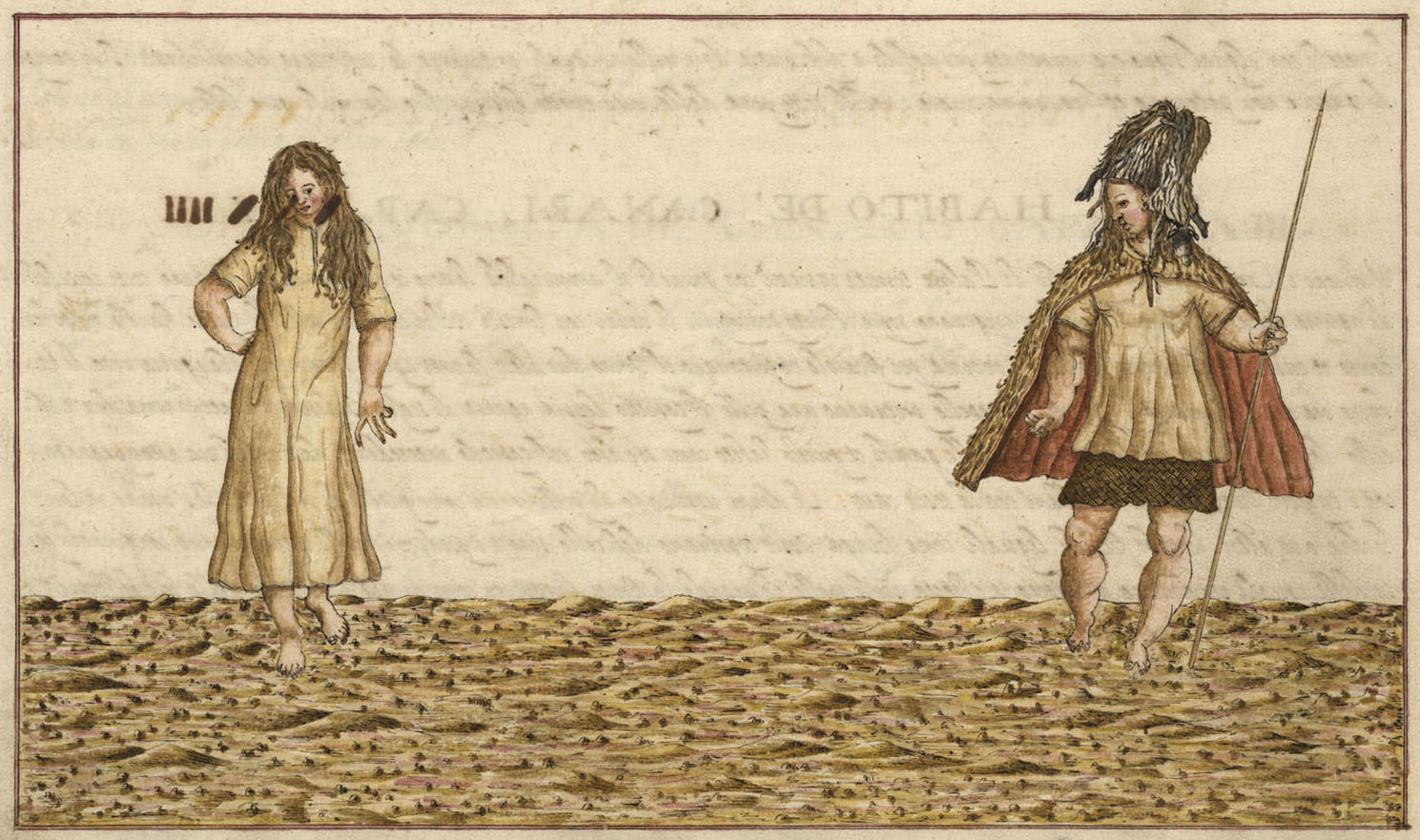
Painting of Guanches of Grand Canaria by Leonardo Torriani, 1592

Fregel et al. 2009b extracted the mtDNA of 30 Guanches from La Palma, (Benahoaritas). 93% of their mtDNA haplogroups were found to be of West Eurasian origin, while 7% were of sub-Saharan African origin. About 15% of their West Eurasian maternal lineages are specific to Europe and the Near East rather than North Africa, suggesting that the Benahoaritas traced partial descent from either of these regions. The examined Benahoaritas were found to have high frequencies of the maternal haplogroups U6b1 and H1-16260. U6b1 has not been found in North Africa, while H1-16260 is "extremely rare." The results suggested that the North African population from whom the Benahoaritas and other Guanches descended has been largely replaced by subsequent migrations.

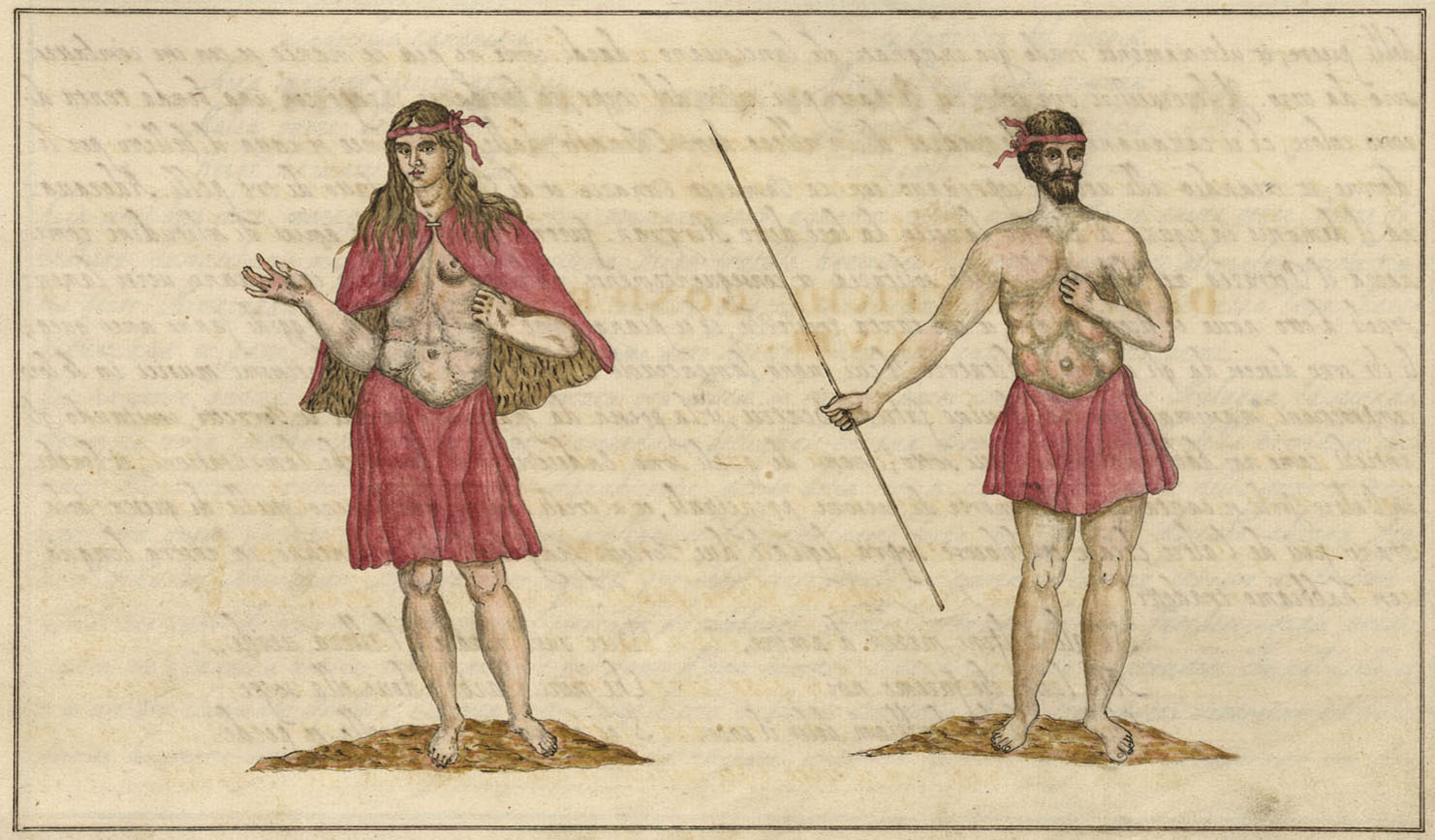
Painting of Gomeros of La Gomera by Leonardo Torriani, 1592

Pereira et al. 2010 studies the origins of the maternal haplogroup U6, which is characteristic of Guanches. It was suggested that the U6 was brought to North Africa by Cro-Magnon-like humans from the Near East during the Upper Paleolithic, who were probably responsible for the formation of the Iberomaurusian culture. It was also suggested that the maternal haplogroup H1, also frequent among Guanches, was brought to North Africa during the Holocene by migrants from Iberia, who may have participated in the formation of the Capsian culture. In a further study, Secher et al. 2014 suggested that U6 was brought to the Levant from Central Europe in the Upper Paleolithic by people of the Aurignacian culture, forming the Levantine Aurignacian (c. 33000 BC), whose descendants had then further spread U6 as part of a remigration into Africa. U6b1a was suggested to have been brought to the Canary Islands during the initial wave of settlement by Guanches, while U6c1 was suggested to have been brought in a second wave.

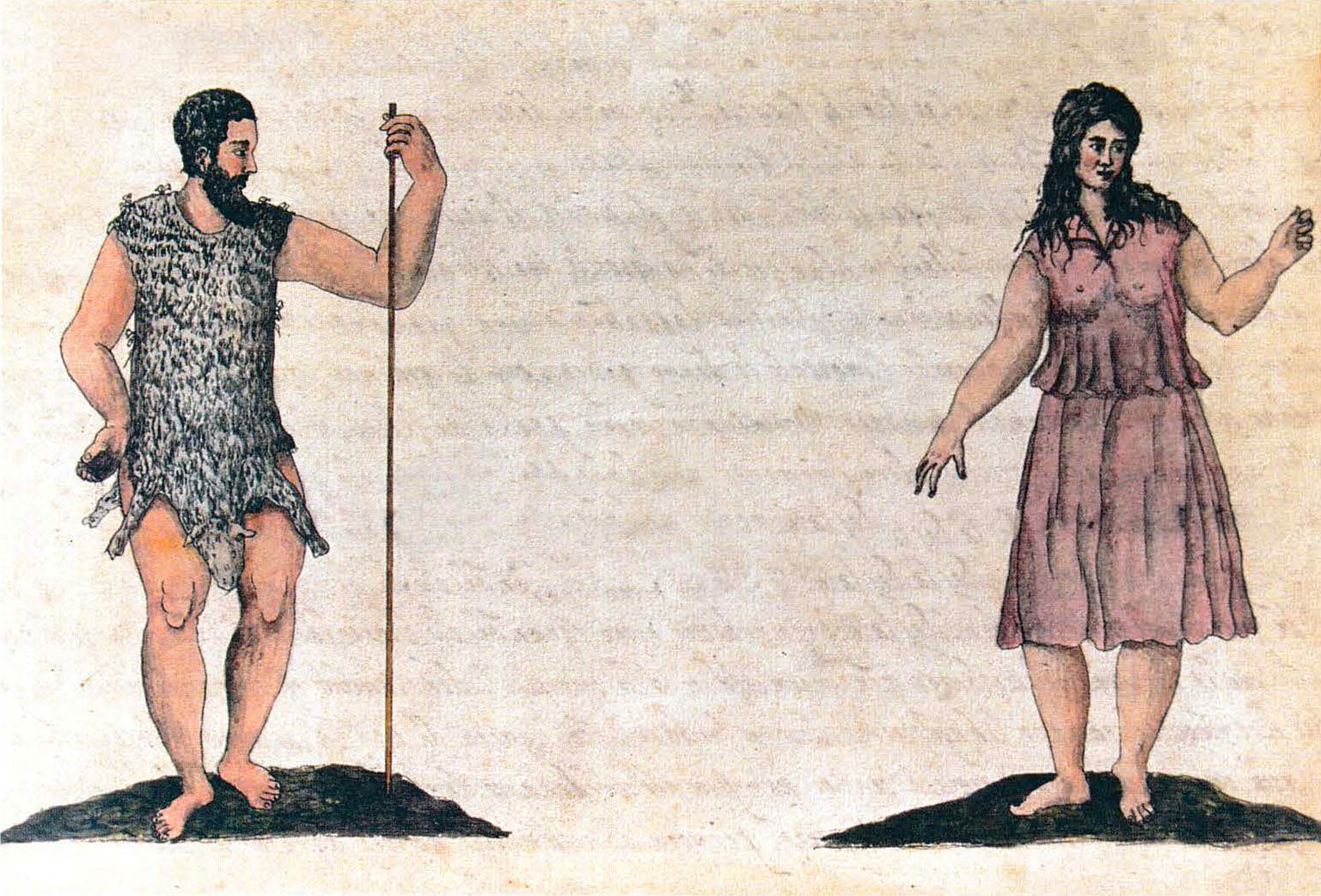
Painting of Bimbache of El Hierro by Leonardo Torriani, 1592

Fregel et al. 2015 examined the mtDNA of Guanches of La Gomera (Gomeros). 65% of the examined Gomeros were found to be carriers of the maternal haplogroup U6b1a. The Gomero appeared to be descended from the earliest wave of settlers to the Canary Islands. The maternal haplogroups T2c1 and U6c1 may have been introduced in a second wave of colonization affecting the other islands. It was noted that 44% of modern La Gomerans carry U6b1a. It was determined that La Gomerans have the highest amount of Guanche ancestry among modern Canary Islanders.

Ordóñez et al. 2017 examined the remains of a large number of Guanches of El Hierro (Bimbache) buried at Punta Azul, El Hierro (c. 1015–1200 AD). The 16 samples of Y-DNA extracted belonged to the paternal haplogroups E1a (1 sample), E1b1b1a1 (7 samples) and R1b1a2 (R1b-M269) (7 samples). All the extracted samples of mtDNA belonged to the maternal haplogroup H1-1626. The Bimbache were identified as descendants of the first wave of Guanche settlers on the Canary Islands, as they lacked the paternal and maternal lineages identified with the hypothetical second wave.

Rodríguez-Varela et al. 2017 examined the atDNA of 11 Guanches buried at Gran Canaria and Tenerife. The 3 samples of Y-DNA extracted all belonged to the paternal haplogroup E1b1b1b1a1 (E-M183), while the 11 samples of mtDNA extracted belonged to the maternal haplogroups H1cf, H2a, L3b1a (3 samples), T2c12, U6b1a (3 samples), J1c3 and U6b. It was determined that the examined Guanches were genetically similar between the 7th and 11th centuries AD, and that they displayed closest genetic affinity to modern North Africans, "but with a tendency (especially for individuals from Gran Canaria) to occupy a space outside modern Northwest African variation, closer to Europeans." The evidence supported the notion that the Guanches were descended from a Berber-like population who had migrated from mainland North Africa. Among modern populations, Guanches were also found to be genetically similar to modern Sardinians. Some models found the Guanche to be more closely related to modern Sardinians than modern North Africans. They were determined to be carriers of Early European Farmer (EEF) ancestry, which probably spread into North Africa from Iberia during the Neolithic, or perhaps also later. One Guanche was also found to have ancestry related to European hunter-gatherers, providing further evidence of prehistoric gene flow from Europe. It was estimated that modern Canary Islanders derive 16–31% of their atDNA from the Guanches. Furthermore, according to the phenotype analysis, these Guanche samples were showing light and medium skin, dark hair and brown eyes.

Fregel et al. 2018 examined remains at the Late Neolithic site of Kelif el Boroud, Morocco (c. 3780–3650 BC). The Kelif el Boroud people were modeled as being equally descended from people buried at the Neolithic sites of Ifri N'Ammar, Morocco (c. 5325–4786 BC) and the Cave of El Toro, Spain (c. 5280–4750 BC). The Kelif el Boroud were thus determined to have carried 50% EEF ancestry, which may have spread with the Cardial Ware culture from Iberia to North Africa during the Neolithic. After the Kelif el Boroud people, additional European ancestry may have been brought to the region from Iberia by people of the Bell Beaker culture. Guanches were found to the genetically very similar to the Kelif el Boroud people. In a 2020 review Fregel et al. identified European Bronze Age ancestry in the Guanches, which could be explained by "the presence of Bell-Beaker pottery in the North African archaeological record," as well as observing a certain admixture "possibly related to trans-Saharan migrations".

Fregel et al. 2019 examined the mtDNA of 48 Guanches buried on all the islands of the Canaries. They were found to be carrying maternal lineages characteristic of North Africa, Europe and the Near East, with Eurasian lineages centered around the Mediterranean being the most common. It was suggested that some of these Eurasian haplogroups had arrived in the region through Chalcolithic and Bronze Age migrations from Europe. Genetic diversity was found to be the highest at Gran Canaria, Tenerife, and La Palma, while Lanzarote, Fuerteventura and particularly La Gomera and El Hierro had low diversity. Significant genetic differences were detected between Guanches of western and eastern islands, which supported the notion that Guanches were descended from two distinct migration waves. It was considered significant that 40% of all examined Guanches so far belonged to the maternal haplogroup H.

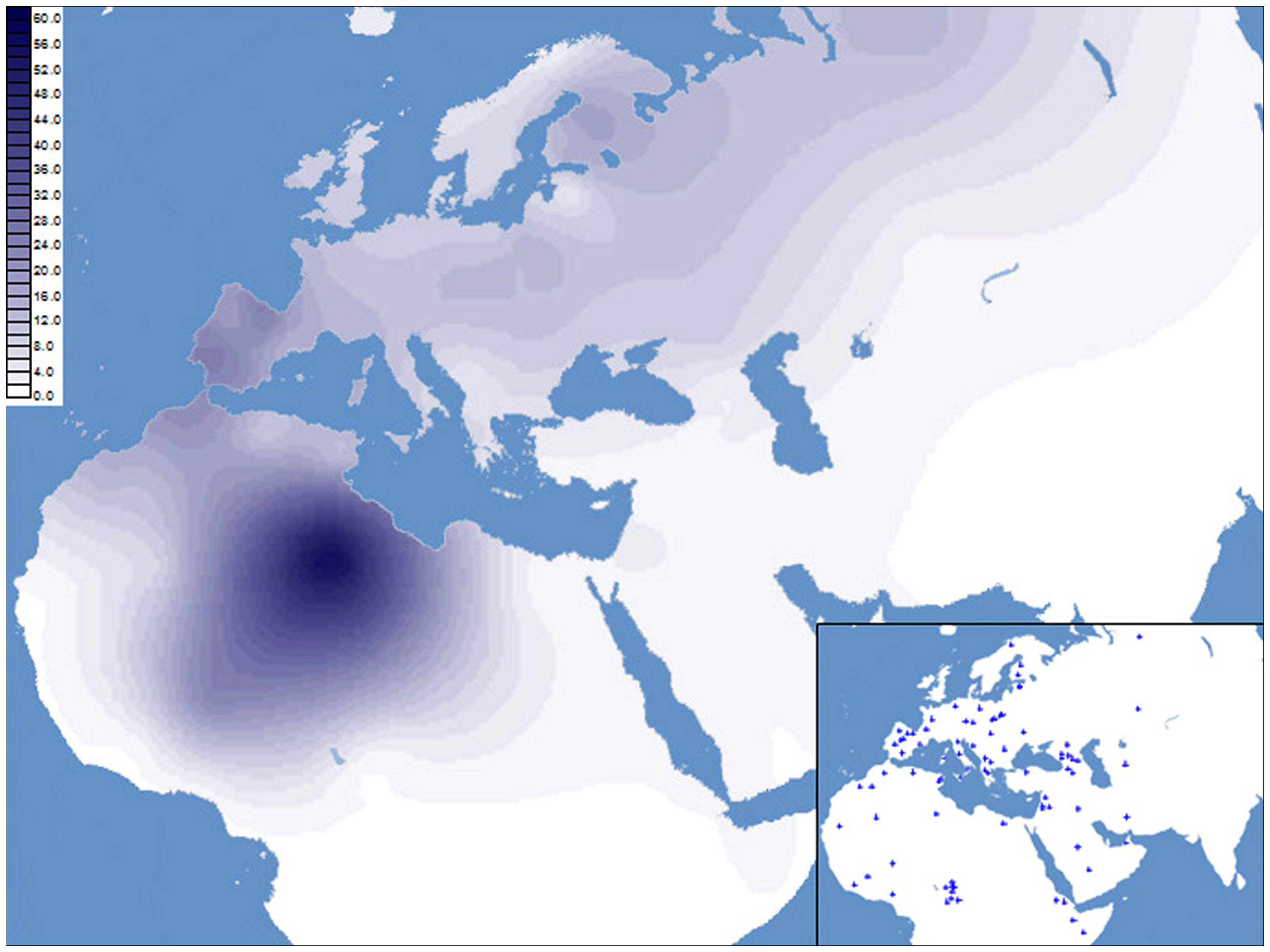
Spatial frequency distribution (%) of haplogroup H1 in western Eurasia and North Africa

Serrano et al. 2023 analysed genome-wide data from 49 Guanche individuals, whose ancestry was modelled as comprising 73.3% Morocco Late Neolithic, 6.9% Morocco Early Neolithic, 13.4% Germany Bell Beaker and 6.4% Mota, on average, with Germany Bell Beaker ancestry reaching 16.2% and 17.9% in samples from Gran Canaria and Lanzarote respectively. The mtDNA results indicated some heterogeneity, as many islands had a greater affinity with populations from Europe, while others were more akin to ancient individuals from prehistoric North Africa. Overall, they formed a cluster with Late Neolithic Moroccans and contemporary North Africans, these observations said to be consistent with other studies.

=== Mitochondrial DNA ===
Regarding mitochondrial DNA, the maternal lineages are characterized by the prevalence of North-African lineages, followed by Europeans and finally in a small percentage by Sub-Saharans. According to different studies, the percentages are the following:

	North-African	European	Sub-Saharan
Canary Islands	57%	43%	0
Canary Islands	50.2%	43.2%	6.6%
Gran Canaria	55%	45%	0

=== Autosomal DNA ===
A 2018 study of 400 adult men and women of all the islands, except La Graciosa, examined the relationship of Canarian genetic diversity with the more prevalent complex diseases in the archipelago. It detected that Canarian DNA shows distinctive genetics, resulting from variables such as the geographical isolation of the islands, environmental adaptations and the historical mixture of Pre-Hispanic population of the archipelago (coming from North Africa), with European and Sub-Saharan individuals. Specifically, the study estimated that the Canarian population, at an autosomal level, is 80% European, 17% North-African and 3% Sub-Saharan.

The table below shows the genomic proportions of North African and Sub-Saharan African ancestry by island.

	North African			Sub-Saharan African		
	Minimum	Average	Maximum	Minimum	Average	Maximum
Fuerteventura	0.218	0.255	0.296	0.011	0.027	0.046
Lanzarote	0.214	0.254	0.296	0.014	0.032	0.057
Gran Canaria	0.155	0.200	0.264	0.005	0.032	0.082
Tenerife	0.149	0.208	0.255	0.002	0.015	0.057
La Gomera	0.160	0.221	0.289	0.013	0.048	0.092
La Palma	0.170	0.200	0.245	0.000	0.013	0.032
El Hierro	0.192	0.246	0.299	0.005	0.020	0.032

== Archeological sites ==
The main and most significant archaeological sites on each island are:

- Lanzarote: Zonzamas
- Fuerteventura: Montaña de Tindaya
- Gran Canaria: Painted Cave of Gáldar
- Tenerife: Masca's solar station
- La Gomera: Fortress of Chipude
- La Palma: Cave of Belmaco
- El Hierro: Archaeological zone of El Julan

== Museums ==
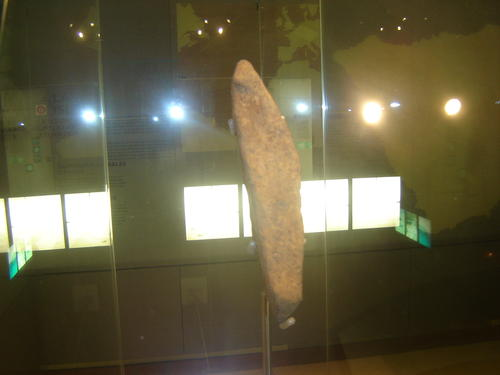
Zanata Stone

Many of the islands' museums possess collections of archaeological material and human remains from the prehistory and history of the archipelago of the Canaries. Some of the most important are:

- Museo de la Naturaleza y el Hombre (Santa Cruz de Tenerife).
- Museo Canario (Las Palmas de Gran Canaria).
- Museum of History and Anthropology of Tenerife (Casa Lercaro, San Cristóbal de La Laguna, Tenerife).
- Archaeological Museum of Puerto de la Cruz (Puerto de la Cruz, Tenerife).

== New religious movement ==
In 2001, the Church of the Guanche People (Iglesia del Pueblo Guanche), a Neopagan movement with several hundred followers, was founded in San Cristóbal de La Laguna (Tenerife).

== Notable people ==
- Beneharo, mencey (transl. king) of Taoro on the island of Tenerife
- Bencomo, penultimate mencey of Taoro
- Tinguaro, sigoñe (transl. warrior) of Tenerife and half-brother of Bencomo
- Dácil, princess and daughter of Bencomo. She is known as the Pocahontas of the Canary Islands; she was presented to the King of Spain with her father and was married to the first Spanish settler.
- Tanausu, ruler of Aceró on the island of Benahoare
- Fernando Guanarteme (born Tenesor Semidan), king who aided Spanish conquest
- Maninidra, brother of Guanarteme
- Acaimo, mencey of Tacoronte on Tenerife
- Abenchara, queen of Gran Canaria
- Francisca de Gazmira, mediator between the indigenous peoples and the Crown of Castile and defender of indigenous rights

== See also ==
- Guanche language
- Hamitic
- Silbo Gomero – a Guanche whistling language, still extant
- Isleños
- First Battle of Acentejo
- Battle of Aguere
- Second Battle of Acentejo
- Teide
- Achinet
- Animero
- Beñesmen

== Bibliography and further reading ==
- Crosby, Alfred W. (1993). Ecological Imperialism: The Biological Expansion of Europe, 900–1900.
- Fregel, Rosa; et al. (3 August 2009). "Demographic history of Canary Islands male gene-pool: replacement of native lineages by European". BMC Evolutionary Biology. 9 (181). BioMed Central: 181. Bibcode:2009BMCEE...9..181F. doi:10.1186/1471-2148-9-181. PMC 2728732. PMID 19650893.
- Fregel, Rosa; et al. (October 2009). "The maternal aborigine colonization of La Palma (Canary Islands)". European Journal of Human Genetics. 17 (10). Nature Research: 1314–1324. doi:10.1038/ejhg.2009.46. PMC 2986650. PMID 19337312.
- Fregel, Rosa; et al. (23 September 2015). "Isolation and prominent aboriginal maternal legacy in the present-day population of La Gomera (Canary Islands)". European Journal of Human Genetics. 23 (9). Nature Research: 1236–1243. doi:10.1038/ejhg.2014.251. PMC 4538205. PMID 25407001.
- Fregel, Rosa; et al. (26 June 2018). "Ancient genomes from North Africa evidence prehistoric migrations to the Maghreb from both the Levant and Europe". Proceedings of the National Academy of Sciences of the United States of America. 115 (26). National Academy of Sciences: 6774–6779. Bibcode:2018PNAS..115.6774F. doi:10.1073/pnas.1800851115. PMC 6042094. PMID 29895688.
- Fregel, Rosa; et al. (20 March 2019). "Mitogenomes illuminate the origin and migration patterns of the indigenous people of the Canary Islands". PLOS One. 14 (3) e0209125. PLOS. Bibcode:2019PLoSO..1409125F. doi:10.1371/journal.pone.0209125. PMC 6426200. PMID 30893316.
- Ordóñez, Alejandra C.; et al. (February 2017). "Genetic studies on the prehispanic population buried in Punta Azul cave (El Hierro, Canary Islands)". Journal of Archaeological Science. 78. Elsevier: 20–28. Bibcode:2017JArSc..78...20O. doi:10.1016/j.jas.2016.11.004.
- Maca-Meyer, Nicole; et al. (24 September 2003). "Ancient mtDNA analysis and the origin of the Guanches". European Journal of Human Genetics. 12 (2). Nature Research: 155–162. doi:10.1038/sj.ejhg.5201075. PMID 14508507.
- Mercer, John (1980). The Canary Islanders: Their History, Conquest & Survival.
- Pereira, Luisa; et al. (21 December 2010). "Population expansion in the North African Late Pleistocene signalled by mitochondrial DNA haplogroup U6". BMC Evolutionary Biology. 10 (1). BioMed Central: 390. Bibcode:2010BMCEE..10..390P. doi:10.1186/1471-2148-10-390. PMC 3016289. PMID 21176127.
- Rodríguez-Varela, Ricardo; et al. (26 October 2017). "Genomic Analyses of Pre-European Conquest Human Remains from the Canary Islands Reveal Close Affinity to Modern North Africans". Current Biology. 27 (21). Cell Press: 3396–3402. Bibcode:2017CBio...27E3396R. doi:10.1016/j.cub.2017.09.059. hdl:2164/13526. PMID 29107554.
- Secher, Bernard; et al. (19 May 2014). "The history of the North African mitochondrial DNA haplogroup U6 gene flow into the African, Eurasian and American continents". BMC Evolutionary Biology. 14 (109). BioMed Central: 109. Bibcode:2014BMCEE..14..109S. doi:10.1186/1471-2148-14-109. PMC 4062890. PMID 24885141.
- Roman Trade with the Canary Islands, Archaeology 50.3 (1997)
- The Voyages of Christopher Columbus
- E. G. Bourne, ed., The Northmen, Columbus and Cabot (New York, 1906) Archived 2010-03-24 at the Wayback Machine
- Canarias.com – Guanches
