= Magec =

Deity in the ancient Berber mythology

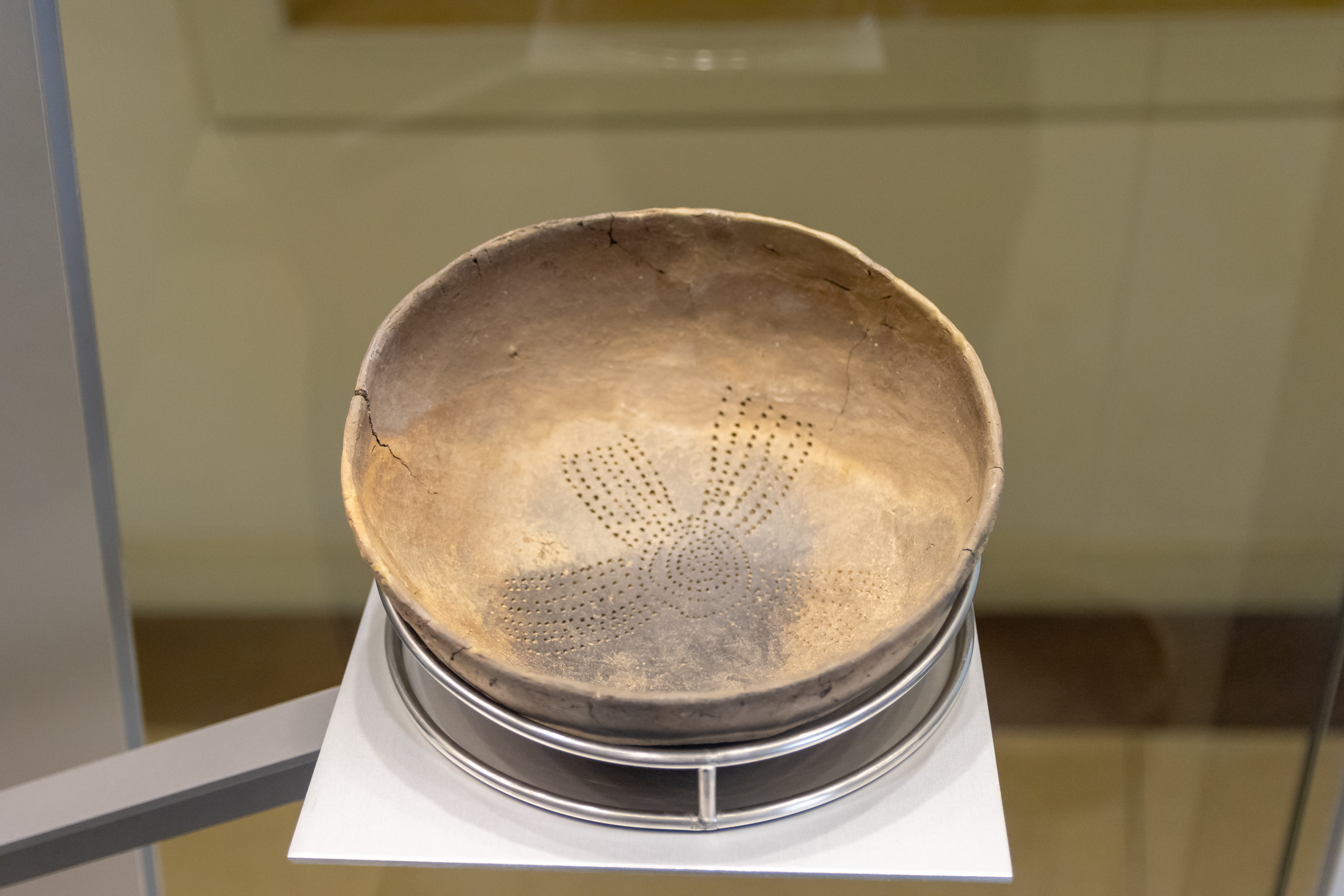
Ceramic vessel with a solar representation inside. Museo de la Naturaleza y Arqueología of Santa Cruz de Tenerife.

Magec (Guanche: Ma-ɣeq, lit. 'possesses radiance, mother of brightness'), in Tenerife, was a deity in the ancient Berber mythology. Magec was god or goddess (actual gender is unknown) of the Sun and light and is thought to be one of the principal divinities in the Guanche religion. According to legend, Magec was captured by Guayota and held prisoner inside Teide before later being liberated by Achamán.

== See also ==
- List of solar deities
- Guanche Religion
