= Gallot =

Gallot is a surname. Notable people with the surname include:

- Jacques Gallot (c. 1625–c. 1695), French lutenist and composer
- Rick Gallot (born 1966), American politician
- Sylvestre Gallot (born 1948), French mathematician
