= Church of the Guanche People =

Spanish religious organisation

- The church's official symbol
- Formation: 2001
- Type: Guanche ethnic neopaganism
- Headquarters: San Cristóbal de La Laguna (Tenerife, Canary Islands, Spain).
- Region served: Canary Islands, Spain
- Website: Church of the Guanche People

The Church of the Guanche People (Spanish: Iglesia del Pueblo Guanche) is a religious organisation, founded in 2001 in the city of San Cristóbal de La Laguna, Tenerife, Canary Islands, Spain. Its goal is to revive and spread the traditional religion of the indigenous Berber Guanche people who occupied the islands at the time of Castilian conquest.

In 2008, the Church had approximately 300 members. The Church of the Guanche People is included in the studies of minority religions in the Canary Islands.

It was founded by a group of Canarian devotees of the goddess Chaxiraxi, a prominent religious figure associated with the harvest in the Guanche religion. The Church of the Guanche People has performed baptisms and weddings according to what they know of Guanche custom.

In 2002, a wedding held in accordance with purported Guanche rites took place on the island of Tenerife. Such a ceremony had not been observed for several centuries, since the Spanish domination of the archipelago.

The Church of the Guanche People has its own liturgical calendar. It officially began with the first celebration of Achu n Magek in 2001. According to this system, this is the year 1 of the Guanche New Age.

== See also ==
- Germanic Heathenism
- Hellenism
- Kemetism
