= Chaxiraxi =

Goddess in the mythology of the aboriginal Guanche of the Canary Islands

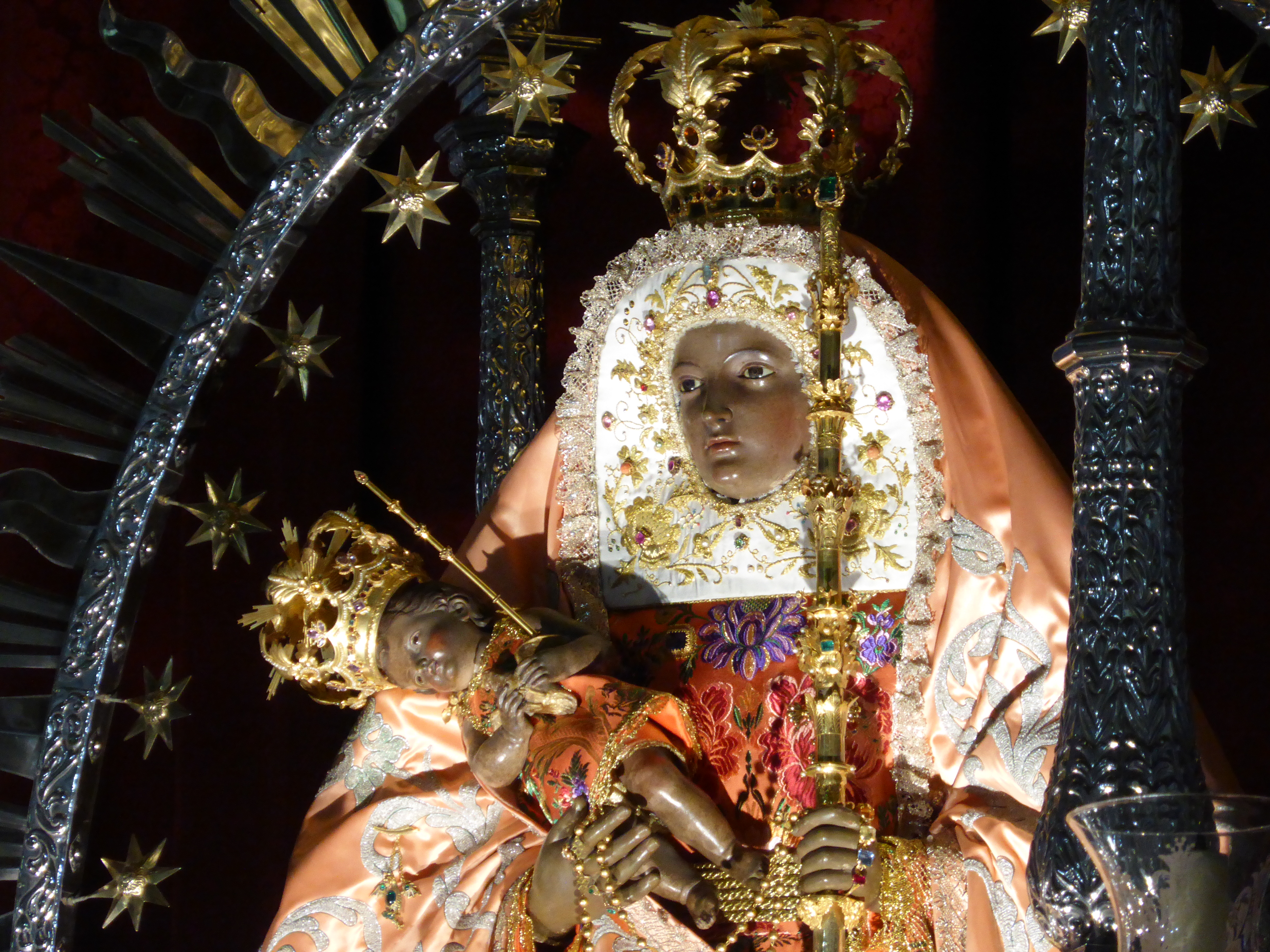
Image of the Virgin of Candelaria (Patron of Canary Islands) in the Basilica of Candelaria (Tenerife)

Chaxiraxi is a goddess, known as the Sun Mother, in the religion of the aboriginal Guanche inhabitants of the Canary Islands. Chaxiraxi was one of the principal goddesses of the Guanche pantheon. She was associated with the star Canopus.

Some scholars interpret Chaxiraxi as a symbol of maternal power, while others emphasize her connection to the moon and fertility. She has also been compared to prominent goddesses from Mediterranean and North African traditions, such as Juno.

As natives of the Canary Islands are believed to have originally been pre-civilization Berbers, it is conjectured that Chaxiraxi may have been adapted from the Punic-Berber goddess Tanit, and given a different name and set of attributes. She is also associated by some with the alleged appearance c. 1392, 1400 or 1401 of the Virgin of Candelaria on Güímar, on the island of Tenerife, carrying her infant, Chijoraji. Over time, her worship was syncretized with that of the Virgin Mary through the influence of Christian missionaries.

== Etymology ==
The term Chaxiraxi — also found in documentation with the variants Chaciraxi, Chijoragi, Chijoraji, and Chirijoraji — is of Guanche origin, possibly derived from a primitive Tamazight form ta-ahghər-ahəghi.

She was also referred to as Achmayex Guayaxerax (in Insular Tamazight: Ach mayes Wayyaghiragh, meaning "behold the mother of him, the Spirit who sustains the universe").

== Present-day worship ==
Chaxiraxi is considered the main goddess of the neo-pagan religion the Church of the Guanche People.
