= Achamán =

Indigenous supreme god of the Canary Islands

Achamán is the supreme god of the Guanches on the island of Tenerife; he is the father god and creator. The name means literally "the skies", in allusion to the celestial vault (the sky).

Achamán, an omnipotent and eternal god, created the land and the water, the fire and the air, and all creatures derived their existence from him. Achamán lived in the heights and sometimes descended upon the summits of the mountains, contemplating his creations.

According to legend, Guayota kidnapped Magec (the sun) and shut it up in the Teide, plunging the world into darkness. Humans prayed to Achamán who saved Magec, and instead locked Guayota up in the Teide. Another aboriginal legend is that of the creation of the human being, according to which Achamán had created a group of men and women of water and land, giving them cattle for their sustenance. Later he created more people, but he did not give them cattle, indicating that they should serve the first ones. This myth of origin explained the different social classes that existed in the Guanche people.

Other names of Achamán are:

- Achuhuran
- Achahucanac
- Achguayaxerax
- Achoron

On other islands, its name also varied, however it is not known if they really belong to the same god. Although if they relate to the supreme god:

- Acoran (Gran Canaria)
- Abora (La Palma)
- Orahan (La Gomera)
- Eraorahan (El Hierro)

In Lanzarote and Fuerteventura, the name of the supreme god is unknown.
