= Somma volcano =

Volcanic caldera that has been partially filled by a new central cone

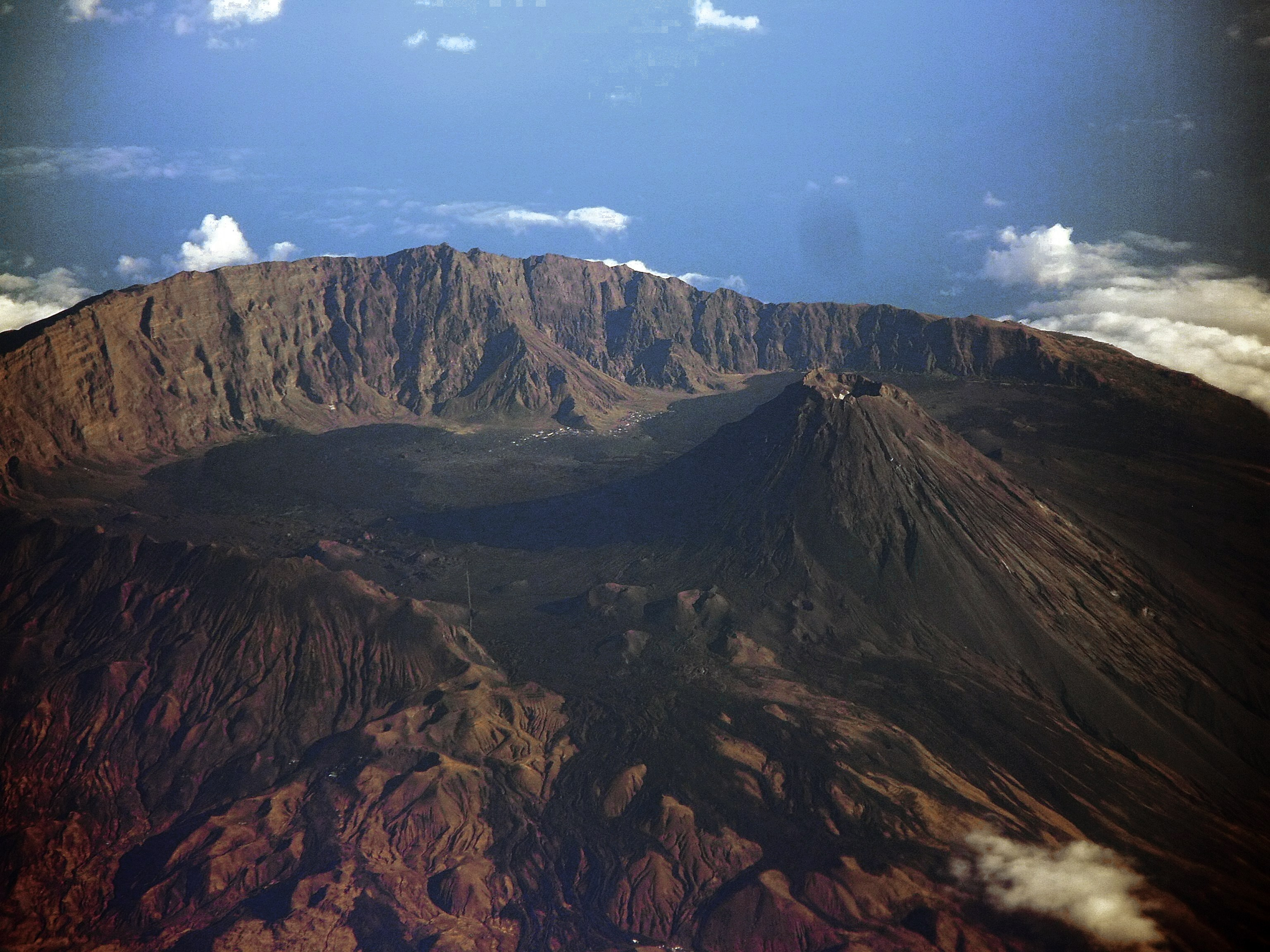
Aerial view of Fogo Island, Cape Verde, an example of a somma volcano. The volcanic cone Pico do Fogo rises 100 m above the walls of the caldera.

A somma volcano, also known as a sommian, is a volcanic caldera that has been partially filled by a new central cone. The type is named after Mount Somma ("Summit"), a stratovolcano in southern Italy with a summit caldera in which the upper cone of Mount Vesuvius has grown. Other examples of somma volcanoes can be found on Russia's Kamchatka Peninsula and the Kuril Islands, stretching south from Kamchatka to Hokkaidō, Japan.

Some examples of somma volcanoes are the following:

- Africa
  - Mount Meru (Arusha Region, Tanzania)
  - Pico do Fogo (Fogo Island, Cape Verde)
  - Piton de la Fournaise (Réunion, France)
  - Teide, Pico Viejo, Montaña Blanca, and Las Canadas Crater (Tenerife, Canary Islands, Spain)
- Americas
  - Cosigüina (Chinandega, Nicaragua)
  - Tecapa (Usulután Department, El Salvador)
  - Mount Mazama (Crater Lake) and Wizard Island (Oregon, United States)
  - Mount St. Helens and associated lava domes, (Washington, United States)
- Asia
  - Ebeko (Paramushir Island, Kuril Islands, Russia)
  - Gunung Baru Jari (Segara Anak caldera, Lombok, Indonesia)
  - Kolokol Group: Kolokol, Berg, Borzov, Trezubetz (Urup Island, Kuril Islands, Russia)
  - Anak Krakatoa (Krakatoa archipelago, Sunda Strait, Lampung, Indonesia): a partially submerged nested somma volcano (with a central cone within a caldera which is itself within a larger caldera).
  - Mount Batur (Bali, Indonesia)
  - Krenitsyn Peak (Tao-Rusyr caldera, Onekotan Island, Kuril Islands, Russia)
  - Medvezhya (Iturup Island, Kuril Islands, Russia)
  - Milna (Simushir Island, Kuril Islands, Russia)
  - Pinatubo (Central Luzon, Philippines)
  - Taal Volcano (Batangas, Philippines)
  - Tengger caldera (East Java, Indonesia)
  - Tondano caldera (North Sulawesi, Indonesia)
  - Sakurajima (Aira caldera, Kyūshū, Japan)
  - Tyatya (Kunashir Island, Kuril Islands, Russia)
  - Urataman (Simushir Island, Kuril Islands, Russia)
  - Zarechny (Kamchatka Peninsula, Russia)
- Europe
  - Alban Hills and Monte Cavo (Lazio, Italy)
  - Santorini caldera and Nea Kameni (Santorini, South Aegean, Greece): a partially submerged somma volcano
  - Mount Pico (Azores, Portugal)
  - Vesuvius and Mount Somma (Campania, Italy)
  - Vulcano and associated calderas (Aeolian Islands, Sicily, Italy)
- Oceania
  - Mount Gharat (Gaua, Vanuatu)

== See also ==
- Crater lake
