= Kolokol =

Kolokol is Russian word which means bell. It may refer to:

- Kolokol (newspaper), a newspaper edited by Alexander Herzen and Nikolay Ogarev
- Kolokol Group, a group of somma volcanoes located in the Kuril Islands, Russia
- Tsar Bell, also referred as "Tsar Kolokol", the largest bell in the world located in the Moscow Kremlin
- Kolokol-1, an opiate-derived, incapacitating agent
- Kolokol, a diving bell
