= Somma =

Somma may refer to:

== Places ==
- Somma Lombardo, an Italian municipality in the Province of Varese
- Somma Vesuviana, an Italian municipality in the Province of Naples
- Sommacampagna, an Italian municipality in the Province of Verona
- Massa di Somma, an Italian municipality in the Province of Naples
- Mount Somma, an Italian mountain part of the Vesuvius complex

== People ==
- Antonio Somma (1809–1864), an Italian writer
- Davide Somma (b. 1985), a South African soccer player
- Mario Somma (b. 1963), an Italian football manager

== Other ==
- Somma volcano (or Somma), a kind of volcanic caldera
- A.C. Somma, an Italian football club based in Sommacampagna

== See also ==
- Summa and Summa (disambiguation)
- Somme (disambiguation)
