= Teide Cableway =

Aerial tramway that goes up Mount Teide, located in Tenerife, Canary Islands

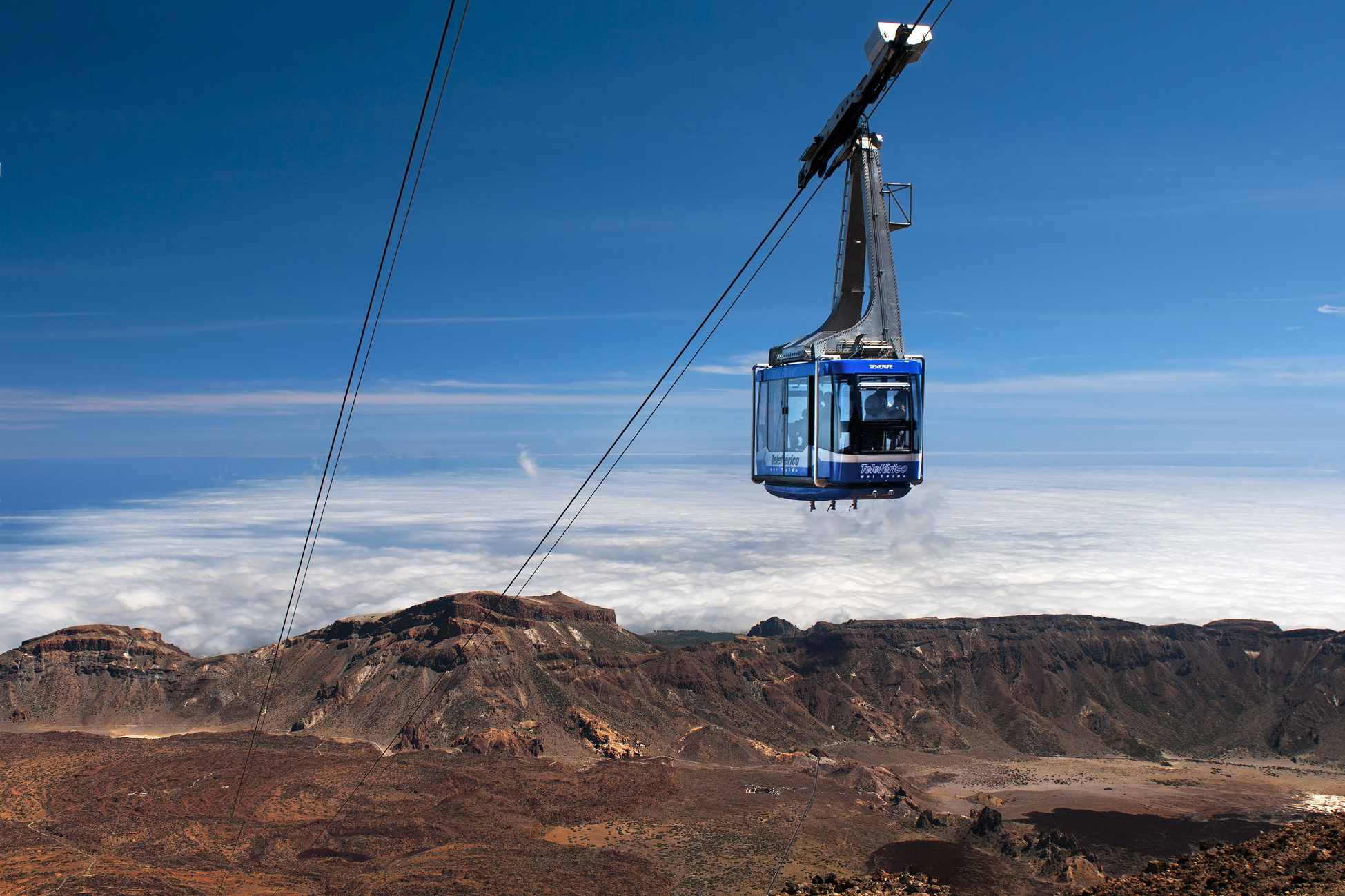

- Location within Canary Islands

Overview
- Character: Aerial tramway
- Location: Teide National Park, Santa Cruz de Tenerife (Canary Islands), Spain
- Coordinates: 28°16′12″N 16°38′20″W
- Website: https://www.volcanoteide.com/en

Teide Cableway (Spanish: Teleférico del Teide) is an aerial tramway that goes up Mount Teide, the highest peak in Spain, located in Teide National Park in Tenerife, Canary Islands. Starting at the base station at 2,356 metres (7,730 ft) above sea level, it ascends to the top station at 3,555 m (11,663 ft) in eight minutes, at a maximum speed of 8 m/s (26 ft/s) and carrying 44 people per cabin. Conceived in 1929, construction of the cableway started on 5 September 1963 and was completed on 27 July 1971, starting operations on 2 August 1971. It was renovated between 1999 and 2007.

== History ==
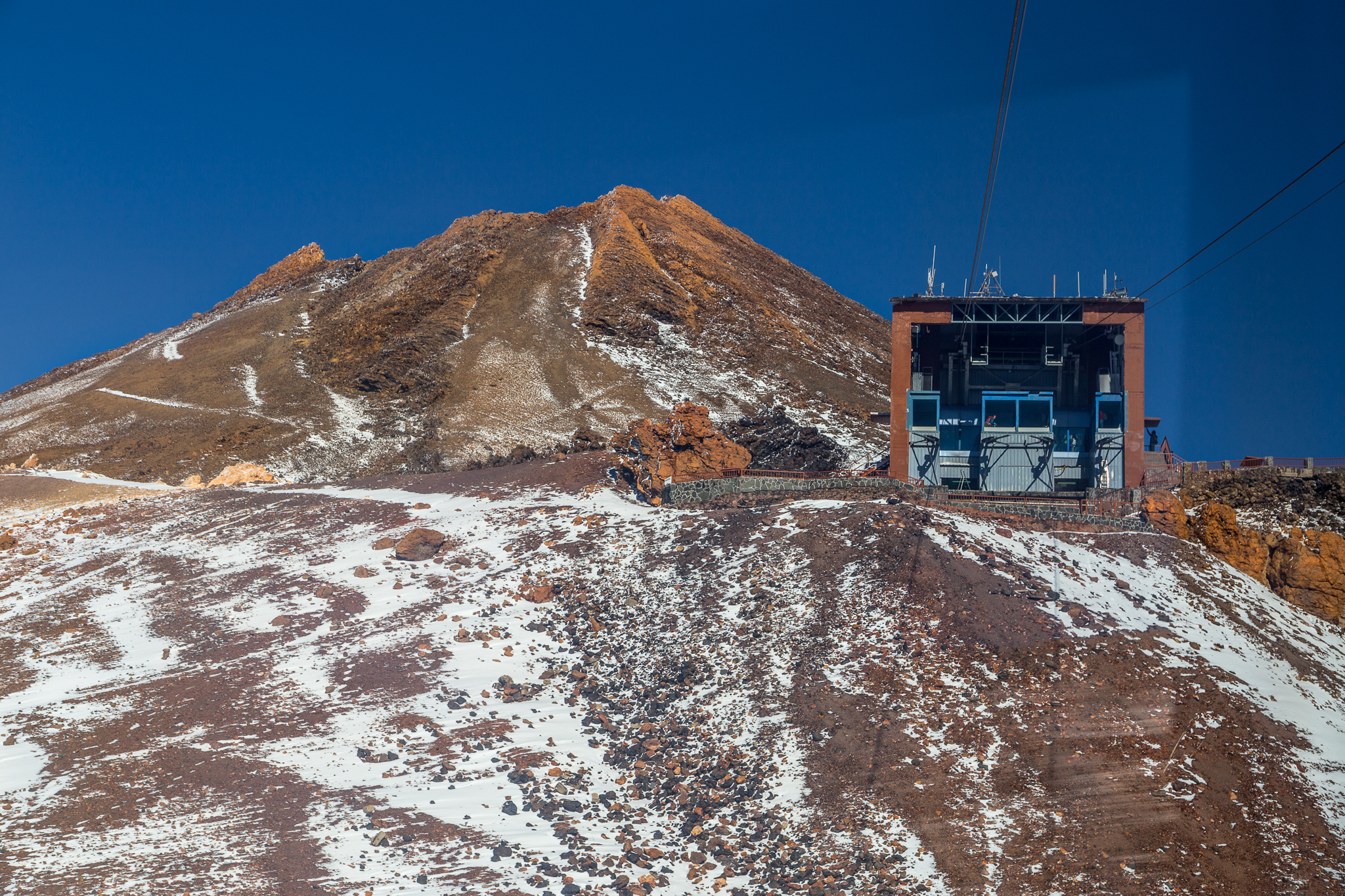
The top station

While various proposals were made over the years for the construction of a cable car to facilitate the ascent of Mount Teide, the project that led to building the cable car was initiated by lawyer Andrés de Arroyo y González de Chávez. In 1929 he visited Germany and, inspired by the cable cars in the region of Zugspitze, on his return to Tenerife he started working on a project to do the same for Teide, paying all expenses.

In 1930, civil engineer José Ochoa Bejumea, of Caminos Canales y Puertos, presented an initial design, with two sections: one with two cabins each holding 35 people and operating between Montaña Majúa and Montaña Fría; the second with a single cabin taking 15 people to the terminus and back. Some 30 years later, after many years of negotiations and modifications to the initial project, Teleférico del Pico del Teide - a society created on 15 October 1959 for the operation of a cable car service - managed to come to an agreement with the Town Hall of La Orotava, acquiring the land needed for construction, in exchange for a school already built in Aguamansa and about 800 m^{2} of land.

In 1960, the final design was finished by Miguel Pintor Domingo, of Caminos, Canales and Puertos, and Francisco Trujillo Armas. Based on the 1930s design, the base station was moved the base station to its current location to reduce the cable length and remove one of the towers. The design used the slope of the terrain to simplify the towers to the intermediate station, and to avoid the use of towers to the terminus.

Land surveys to define the final locations of the stations and four towers was started in April 1962 and completed in 1963. Construction started on 5 September 1963 with the excavations for the road to the base station, and lasted eight years. The foundations and civil structures were constructed by Entrecanales y Tabora S.A., with the cable car installed by the Italian company Ceretti e Tanfani S.A. Construction material was initially moved by workers and donkeys until a hoist and auxiliary cable car were installed in 1967.

Construction was inaugurated on 18 July 1971, completed on 27 July 1971, and the cableway started operating on 2 August 1971. It was renovated between 1999 and 2007, with new towers, cables, and cable cars, as well as remodelling of the stations and renewal of the machinery and electrics.

== Cableway Structure ==
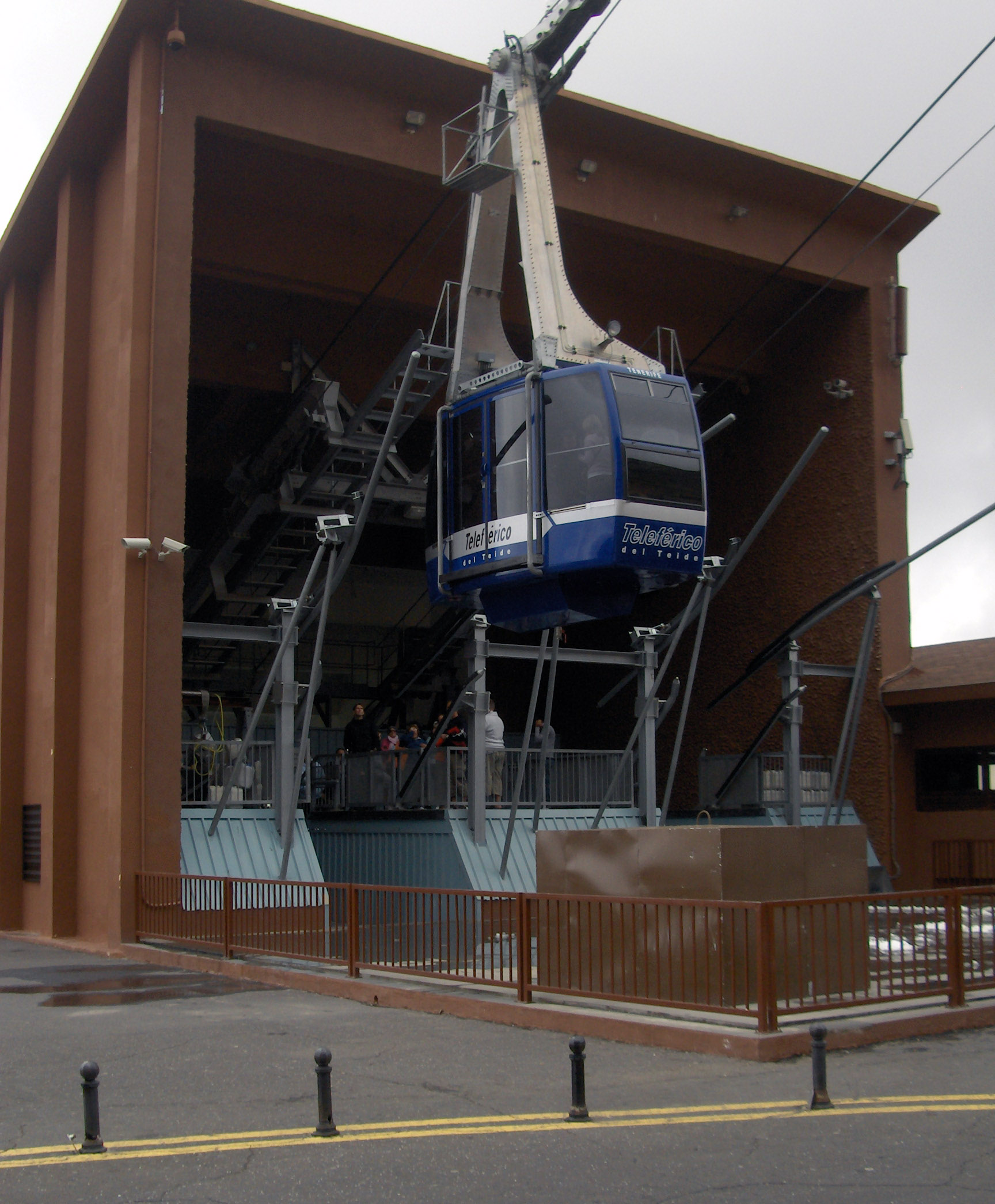
A cable car at the bottom station of the cableway

The cableway has two stations. The base station, at 2,356 m (7,730 ft), is accessible by car, with 220 parking slots, a bar, restaurant and a souvenir shop on-site.

The cabins can accommodate a maximum of 44 people, and the journey time is eight minutes. The cables are served by four towers depending on each other.

The mechanism is structured so that when one car goes up the other must go down.

The upper station at La Rambleta is 3,555 m (11,663 ft) above sea level and has Spain's highest payphone. La Rambleta has views of the Seven Cañadas and the Ucanca Valley.

Trails lead to north-facing La Fortaleza and south-facing Pico Viejo viewpoints, with the latter being a guided tour with views of La Gomera, El Hierro, La Palma and the Pico Viejo crater. There is also restricted access to the top crater of Mount Teide, the highest peak in Spain at 3,718 m (12,198 ft) above sea level, by the Telesforo Bravo trail. There is a path that connects the two stations.

== Ownership and Company Structure ==
The facility is currently operated by Teleférico del Pico de Teide, a limited company created in August 1959, of which the Tenerife City Hall holds 49.44% of the shares (2008 figure). The company has 45 employees; its manager is Ignacio Sabaté and the president of its board of directors is Carlos Alonso (2017 data).

In 2013, the company incorporated Volcano Life, S.L. as a tourism intermediary, with a workforce of about 40 staff (2017 figure). The Volcano Teide Experience trademark is then born, with the aim of promoting and enhancing a respectful, informative, safe and enjoyable approach to visiting Mount Teide.

== Operation ==
The cablecar operates between 09:00 and 16:00, with the last car ascending at 16:00 and the last car descending at 16:50. The closing time is delayed by some hours between July and October, up until the clocks change. The time at the top station is limited to 1 hour. As of 2023, ticket prices start at €22.00 each way, or €40.00 round-trip.

In its 33 years of operation (up until 2019), the cable car has experienced two breakdowns; on 15 March 2017, where 60 people were trapped in two cable cars for a couple of hours, and on 18 August 2018 when an electric motor failure led to the evacuation of 34 people from the cable cars, with 115 people at the top of the volcano at the time. The cable car was operated manually to transport them back to the base station.

The 2017 incident left around 200 people at the top of the volcano, 60 of whom stayed in the shelter overnight. The previous time the evacuation protocols had been used was 20 years earlier.
