= Somme =

Somme or The Somme may refer to:

== Places ==
- Somme (department), a department of France
- Somme, Queensland, Australia
- Canal de la Somme, a canal in France
- Somme (river), a river in France

== Arts, entertainment, and media ==
- Somme (book), a First World War military history book
- The Somme (film), a 1927 British documentary film
- The Somme – From Defeat to Victory, BBC TV documentary

== Military ==
- French tanker Somme, a French Navy tanker and command ship
- HMS Somme (1918), a British World War I S-class destroyer
- Battle of the Somme, World War I
  - Somme American Cemetery and Memorial
  - Somme Heritage Centre

== See also ==
- Battle of the Somme (disambiguation) for other uses
- Som (disambiguation)
- Some (disambiguation)
- Somm (disambiguation)
- Somma (disambiguation)
