= Som =

Som, SOM or Søm may refer to:

== Computing ==
- System Object Model (file format), of the HP-UX operating system
- Simulation Object Model, in computer high-level architecture (simulation)
- System on module, in computer embedded systems
- Self-organizing map, neural network in machine learning
- IBM System Object Model, a programming tool

== Organizations ==
- SOM (architectural firm), influential American modernist firm Skidmore, Owings & Merrill, founded in 1936
- SOM Foundation, award-giving foundation, founded by SOM architect Bruce Graham in 1979
- SOM Institute, Swedish survey research institute focused on issues around Society, Opinion and Media, founded in 1986
- SOM Biotech, Spanish pharmaceutical company, founded in 2009
- Yale SOM, the Yale School of Management, founded in 1976

== Places ==
- Som, Somogy, Hungary
- Som, Uttar Pradesh, India
- Søm, Kristiansand, Norway
- Somalia, ISO 3166 three-letter code
- IOC Olympic country code for Somalia
- Somerset, county in England, Chapman code

== Transport ==
- SOM (missile), of the Turkish Air Force
- Som-class submarine, Russia
- Somerset Railroad (New York), reporting mark
- South Milford railway station, North Yorkshire, England (National Rail station code SOM)
- SOM Center Road, name of a portion of Ohio State Route 91

== People with the name ==
- Bram Som (born 1980), Dutch runner
- Preah Botumthera Som (1852–1932), Cambodian writer
- Som Sereyvuth, Cambodian judge
- Som Wardner, British musician

== Other uses ==
- Soum (currency) (also spelled "som") unit of currency in some Turkic-speaking countries
- Som (grape), or Furmint
- Somali language, ISO 539 three-letter code
- Som language, of Papua New Guinea
- Serviceable obtainable market, an alternate business term for target market
- Soundman (rank), or SoM, a former rank of the U.S. Navy
- Saskatchewan Order of Merit, Canada, post-nominal letters
- Seine–Oise–Marne culture, an ancient culture in northern France
- Serious otitis media, a disease of the ear
- Soil organic matter
- Superior oblique myokymia

== See also ==
- Some (disambiguation)
- Somm (disambiguation)
- Somme (disambiguation)
