= Mount Guajara =

Mountain in Tenerife, Spain

Coordinates: 28°13′01″N 16°36′42″W

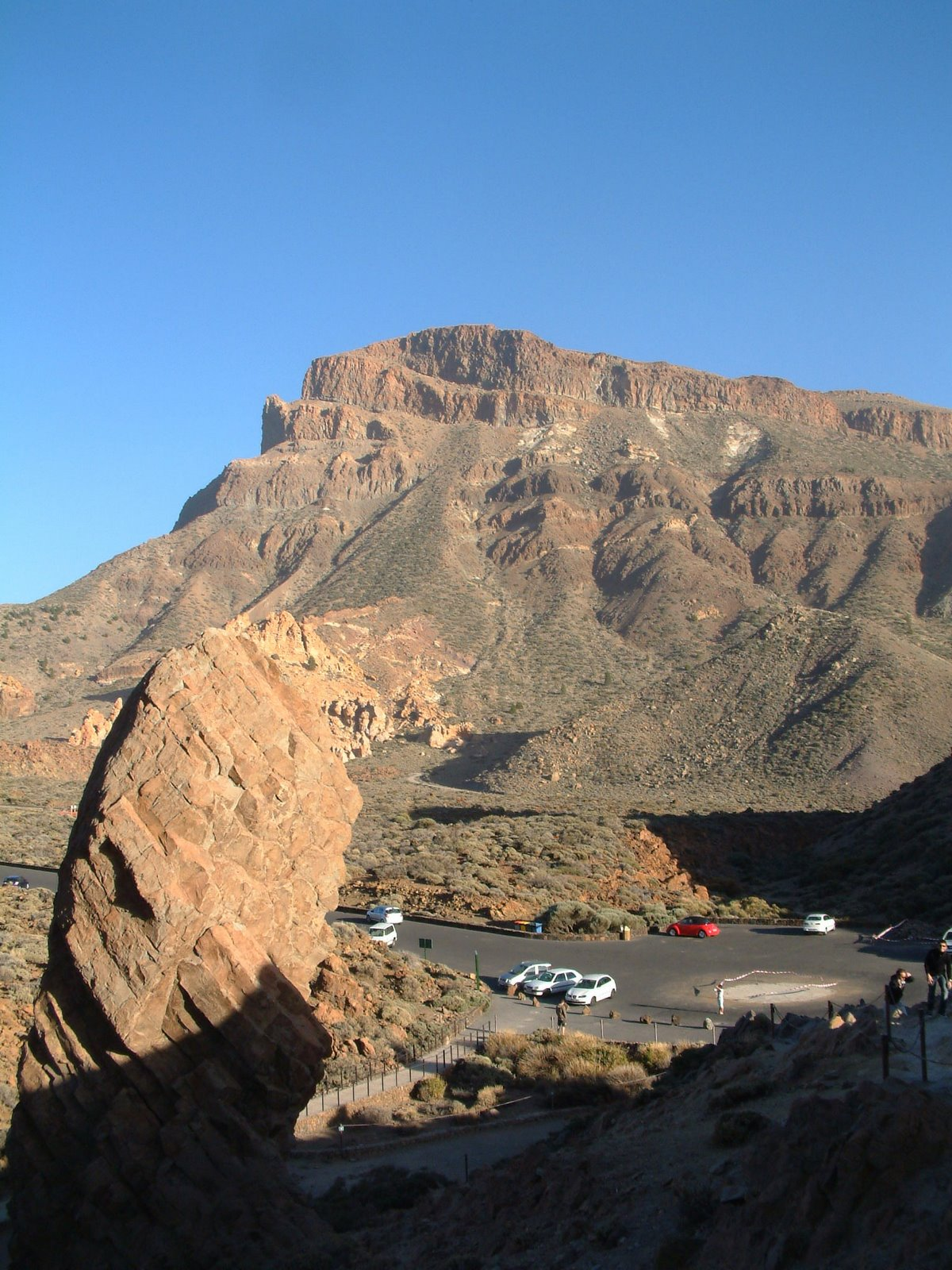
Mount Guajara from Roques de García

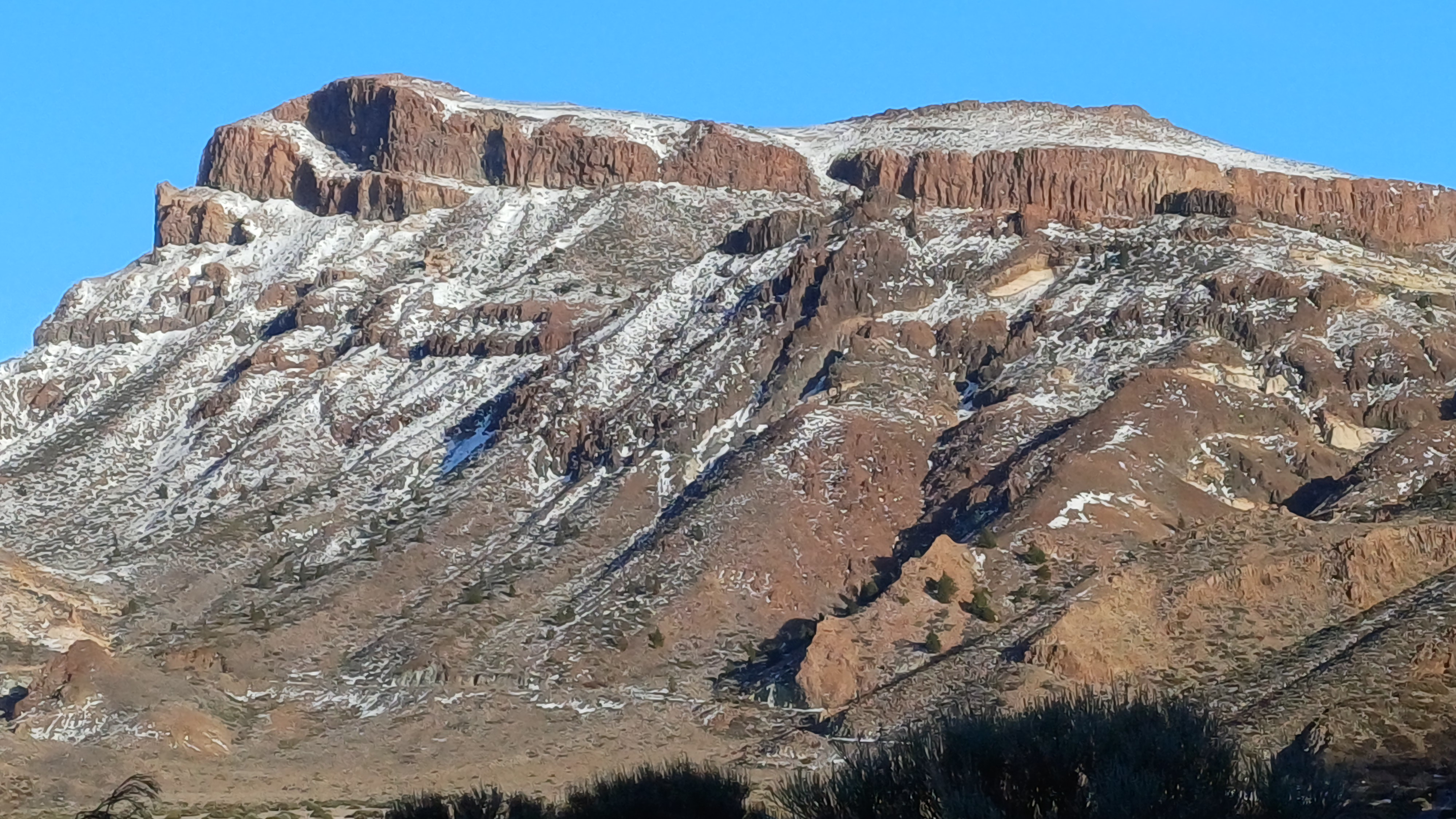
Snow on the summit of Teide is fairly common, but quite rare in other parts of Teide National Park (2025/12).

Mount Guajara is a 2,718 m (8,917 ft) high mountain on Tenerife, in the Canary Islands. It is the third highest peak of the island and of the Canary archipelago, after Teide and Pico Viejo.

Mount Guajara along with the entire Island of Tenerife is a volcano which has a large crater close to its summit which is accessible by road, the last leg to the summit at the northern end which is its highest point can be reached from a trail head within the crater.

There is also an astronomical observatory located along a ridge at the eastern end of the crater.

== Climbing routes ==
There are several different routes from the north and from the south. For the north access the most convenient starting point is at the hotel Parador. Roads access the Parador from four different sides of the island, and there is bus service both from the north and from the south. The hike to the summit from the hotel takes up to two hours.

The hike from the south the Vilaflor village to the summit takes at least four to five hours. This is a considerably more difficult route due to the lower starting point which is at around 1400 meters above the sea level.

There are no restrictions or permits for climbing Guajara.

== See also ==
- Pico Viejo
- Teide
