= Roque Cinchado =

Rock formation in Tenerife, Canary Islands, Spain

Coordinates: 28°13′29″N 16°37′54″W

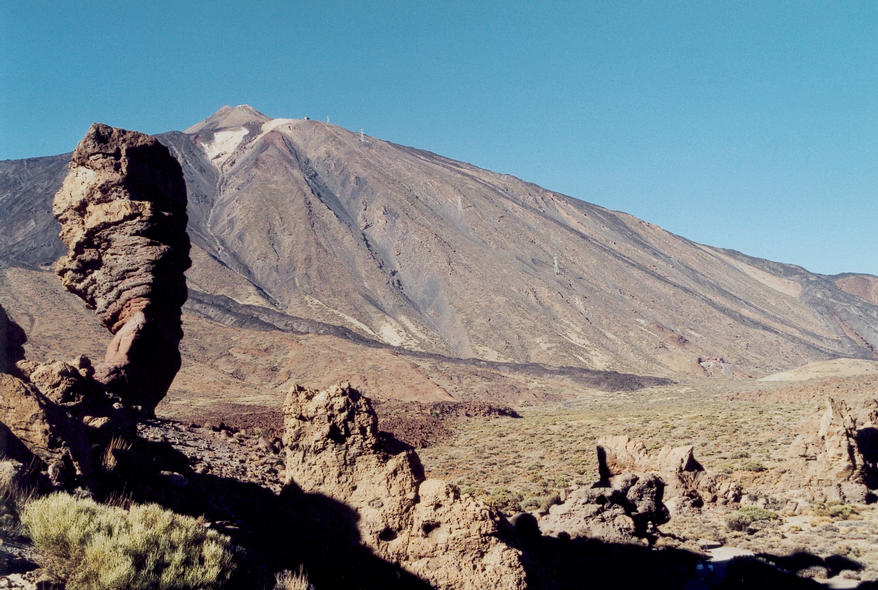
Roque Cinchado (left foreground) and Teide volcano

Roque Cinchado is a volcanic rock formation regarded as emblematic of the island of Tenerife (Canary Islands, Spain). It lies within the Teide National Park (a World Heritage Site) in the municipality of La Orotava, near Teide volcano, in the heart of the island. Roque Cinchado is located about 1700 meters below the summit of Teide volcano. It belongs to a group of rock formations, remnants of the former summit of the island, known as "Roques García".

Roque Cinchado is a 27-metre high rock pillar, composed mostly of volcaniclastic sedimentary rock layers. Its upper sedimentary layers have been intruded by two sills of lava, which have made the upper part of the pillar more resistant to erosion.

The rock appeared on one thousand peseta bank notes, with Teide in the background.

== See also ==
- Geology of the Canary Islands
