= Somm =

Somm may refer to:

- Somm language, or Som, spoken in Papua New Guinea
- Sommelier, a trained and knowledgeable wine professional
- Somm (film), a 2022 American documentary about the Master Sommelier examination
- SOMM TV, a food and wine streaming network

== See also ==
- Som (disambiguation)
- Some (disambiguation)
- Somme (disambiguation)
