= Montaña Blanca =

Mountain in Tenerife, Spain

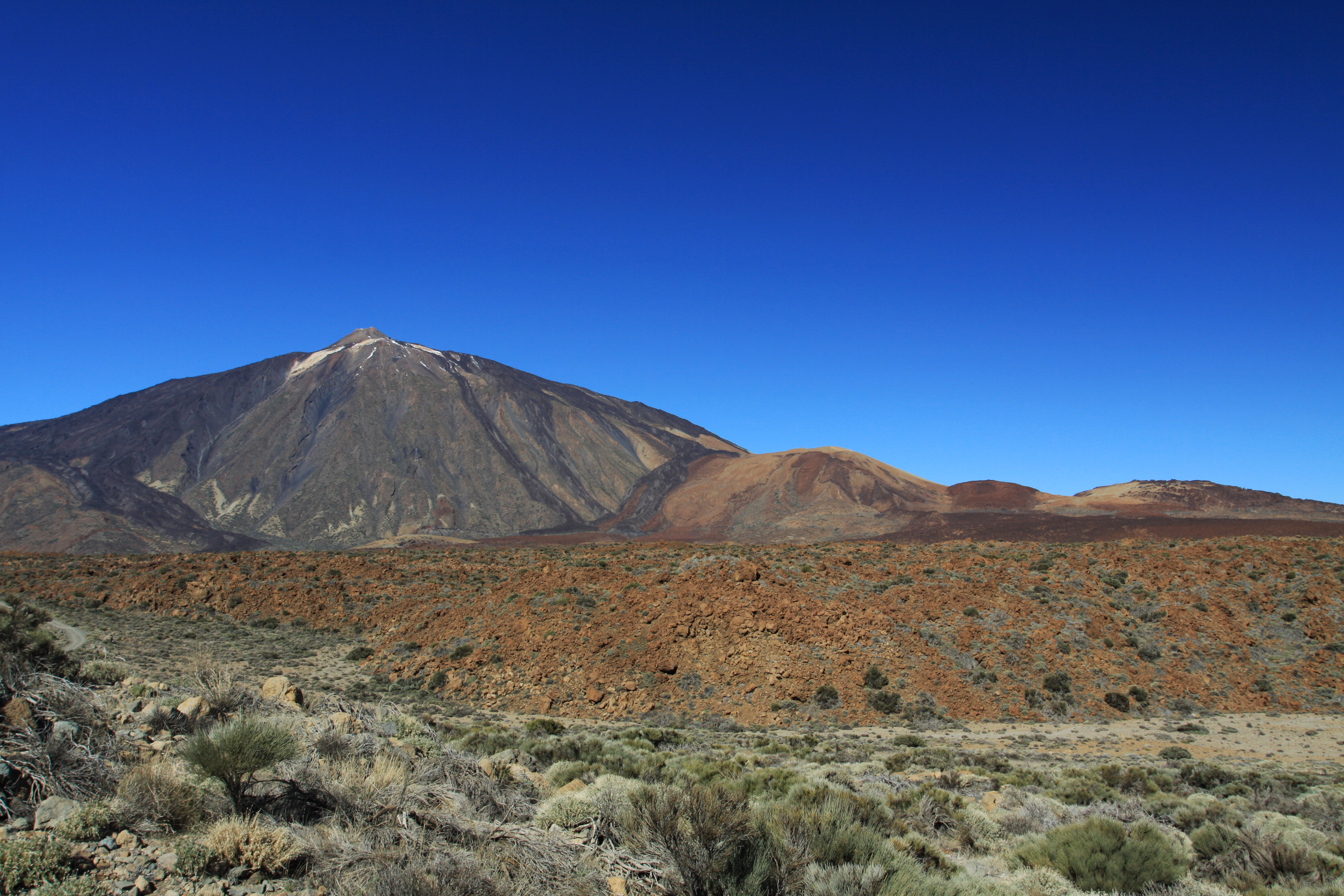
- Volcano Montaña Blanca on Teide

Highest point
- Elevation: 2,748 m (9,016 ft)
- Prominence: 28 m (92 ft)
- Coordinates: 28°16′8″N 16°36′51″W

Geography
- Location within Canary Islands
- Location: Tenerife, Canary Islands, Spain

Montaña Blanca is a mountain on the Canary Island of Tenerife. Its flat summit is on the eastern flank of the Pico del Teide above the edge mountains of the Las Cañadas basin, at a height of 2,748 m (9,016 ft). This makes the Montaña Blanca the third highest peak in Tenerife after the Pico del Teide (3,718 m (12,198 ft)) and the Pico Viejo (3,135 m (10,285 ft)).

== Formation ==
The Montaña Blanca is a flank volcano of the Pico del Teide, whose name is due to the beige color of the light-colored pumice on its surface. It was created by volcanic processes that took place around 50 BC, in three phases. Initially, phonolitic lava with a volume of about 0.022 km^{3} emerged from a west-northwest-east-southeast trending eruption fissure system on the east flank of the Pico del Teide. The eruption then transitioned into an explosive sub-Plinian phase, measuring magnitude 4 on the Volcanic Explosivity Index. Within 7 to 11 hours, phonolitic pumice and ash (approximately 0.25 km^{3} DRE) descended from a 15 km high eruptive column in a northeasterly direction and covered an area of at least 40 km^{2}. In the third phase, about 0.025 km^{3} of lava came out, and today's lava dome was formed. The Montaña Blanca subplinian eruption is the only known explosive eruption in the Pico del Teide-Pico Viejo volcanic complex.

== Ascent ==
The Montaña Blanca is an excellent vantage point. It can be easily climbed via a branch from the Sendero trail no. 7 (from the car park on the TF-21 below the Montaña Blanca to the summit of the Teide). The tour can also start at the El Portillo Visitor Center and then take either trails #1 and #6 or #1 and #22 to Sendero #7.
