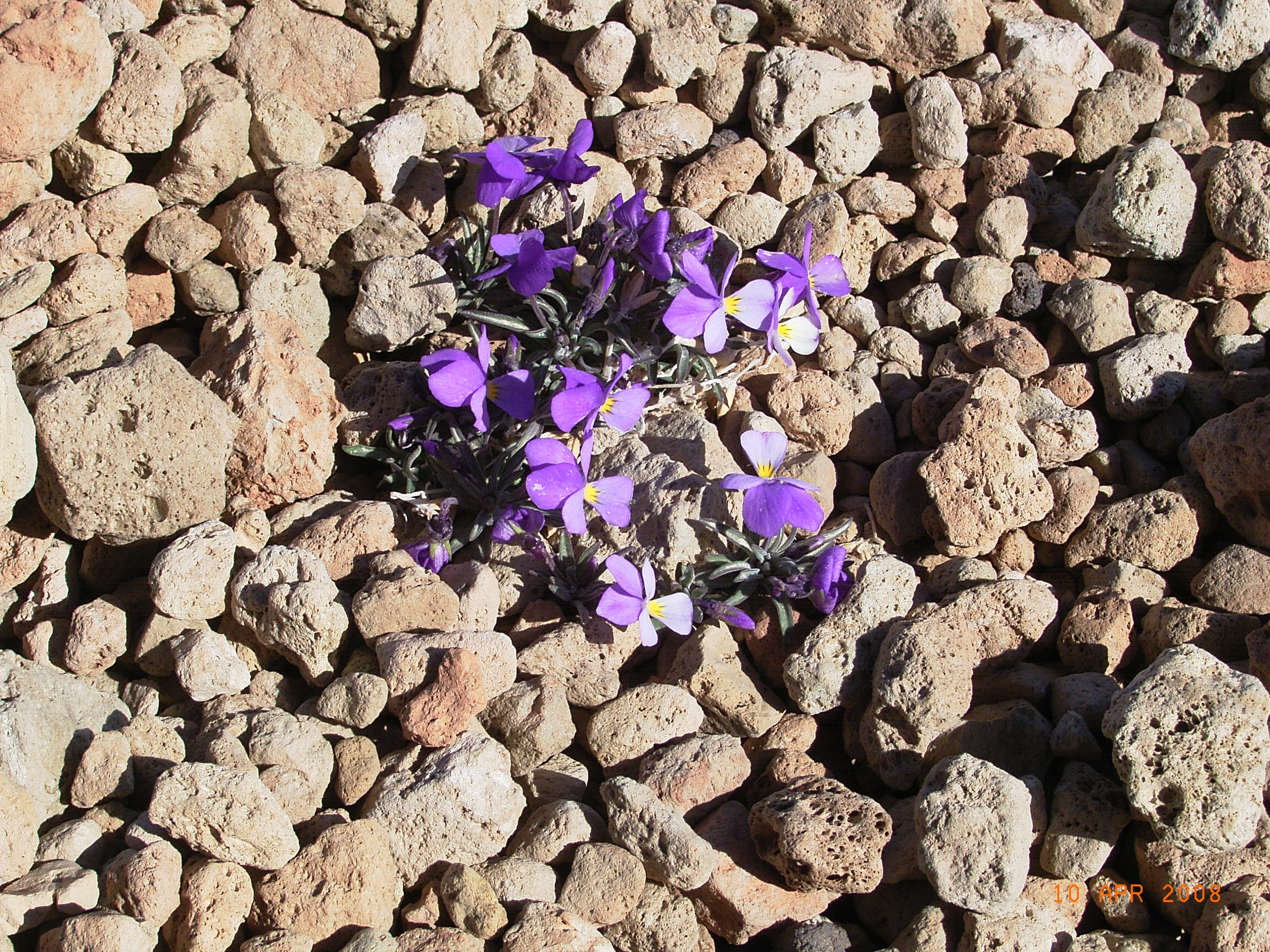

Scientific classification
- Kingdom: Plantae
- Clade: Tracheophytes
- Clade: Angiosperms
- Clade: Eudicots
- Clade: Rosids
- Order: Malpighiales
- Family: Violaceae
- Genus: Viola
- Species: V. cheiranthifolia

Binomial name
- Viola cheiranthifolia Humb. & Bonpl.

= Viola cheiranthifolia =

Teide violet

Species of flowering plant

Viola cheiranthifolia is a species of the genus Viola. It is also known as the Teide violet and Teide daisy.

This plant is exclusively found in the dry and stony caldera of the volcano Teide on the Canary Island of Tenerife. It survives there in altitudes of 2000-3000m. Most of the time it is hiding under the rocks. It is only visible for three weeks in spring, when it comes out to the surface for pollination.

It reaches heights of 6 to 7 inches. The violet of the Teide is the plant that blooms to greater height of all Spain, can even be observed in the own crater of the Teide.

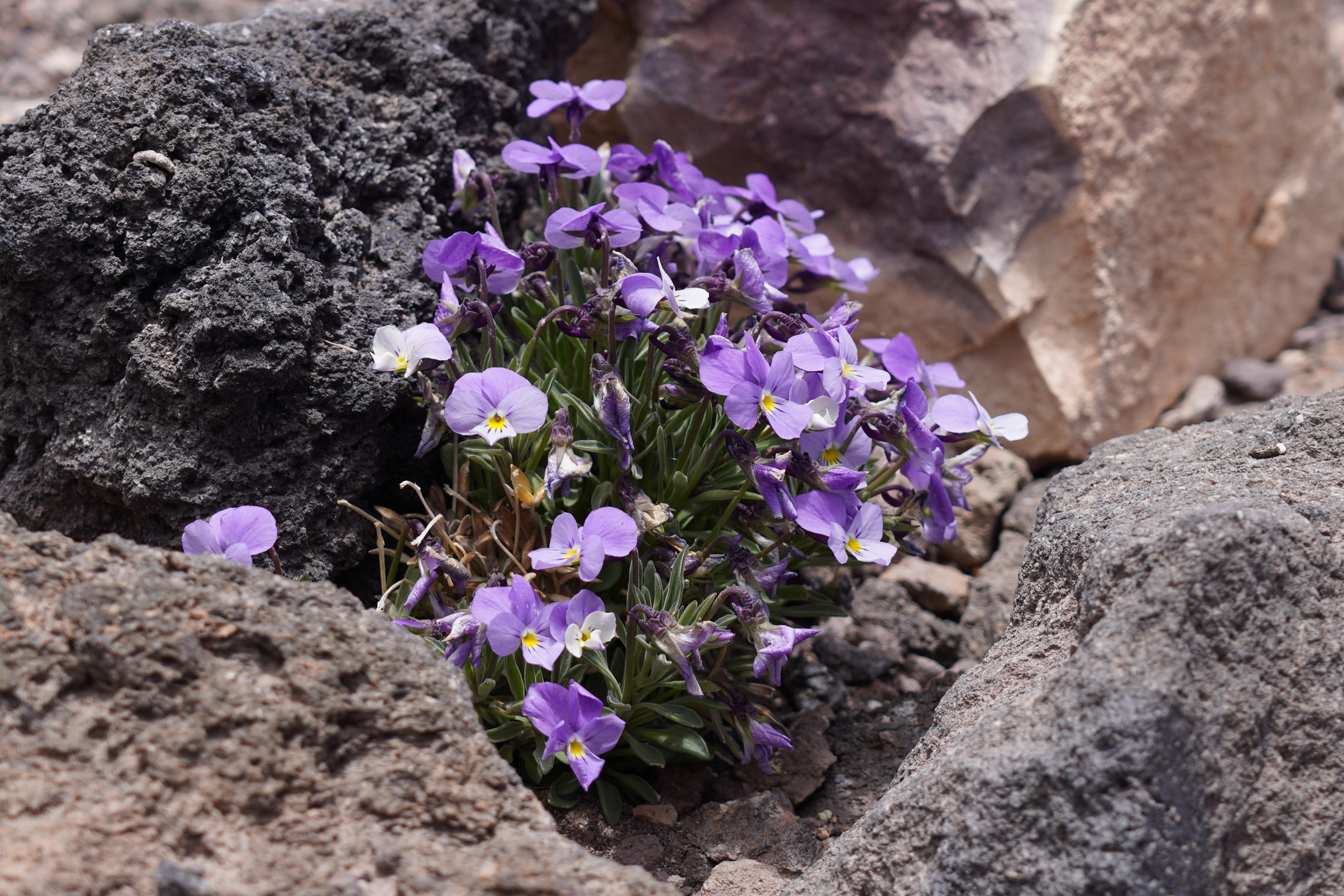
Teide violet blooming at 3200 meters during spring.
