= Some =

Some may refer to:

- some, an English word used as a determiner and pronoun; see use of some
- The term associated with the existential quantifier
- Some (surname)
- Socialist-oriented market economy, the Vietnamese economic system occasionally abbreviated SOME
- Social market economy, the German socioeconomic model abbreviated SOME
- So Others Might Eat (SOME), a Washington, D.C.–based non-profit organization
- SoMe, short for social media
- Some (film), a 24 film
- "Some" (song), a duet by Junggigo and Soyou
- "Some", a song by Built to Spill from their 1994 album There's Nothing Wrong with Love
- Some & Any, German pop duo

== See also ==
- Som (disambiguation)
- Somm (disambiguation)
- Somme (disambiguation)
