= Summa (disambiguation) =

A summa is a text that sums up knowledge in a field, such as:

- Summa Theologica and Summa contra Gentiles, the most famous works of Thomas Aquinas.

Summa may also refer to:

== Places and jurisdictions ==
- Summa, Iran, a village in East Azerbaijan Province, Iran
- Samma, Jordan, old name for this Jordanian village
- Summa, Numidia, a former city and bishopric in the Roman province of Numidia, now a Latin Catholic titular see

== Other ==
- Summa (genre)
- Summa (Pärt), a 1978 composition by Arvo Pärt
- Summa Corporation, a defunct American company
- Summa Health System, one of the largest organized delivery systems in Ohio
- 1928 Summa, a main-belt asteroid
- Battle of Summa, a 1939–1940 battle fought between the Soviet Union and Finland
- Homer Summa (1898–1966), an American baseball player
- Scalable Universal Matrix Multiplication Algorithm; see Cannon's algorithm

== See also ==
- Somma (disambiguation)
- Summa potestas (law)
