= Kolokol Group =

Somma volcanoes in Kuril Islands, Russia

- Location within Far Eastern Federal District

Highest point
- Elevation: 1,328 m (4,357 ft)
- Prominence: 1,205 m (3,953 ft)
- Listing: Ribu
- Coordinates: 46.042°N 150.05°E

Geography
- Location: Urup, Kuril Islands, Russia

Geology
- Mountain type: Somma volcanoes
- Last eruption: July 1973

Kolokol Group (Russian: Группа Колокола, romanized: Gruppa Kolokola) is a group of somma volcanoes located in the central part of Urup Island, Kuril Islands, Russia. The group is named after its highest volcano but also includes volcanoes called Berg, Trezubetz (which erupted in 1924) and Borzov. The most active in the group is Berg, while Borzov is the oldest.

== See also ==
- List of volcanoes in Russia
