= SOM Biotech =

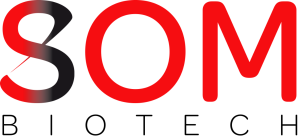
- Type: Private Company
- Industry: Pharmaceutical
- Founded: 2009; 17 years ago
- Headquarters: Barcelona, Spain
- Products: Pharmaceuticals
- Website: www.sombiotech.com

SOM Innovation Biotech, S.A. (SOM Biotech), is a private pharmaceutical company focused on the accelerated discovery and development of therapies for orphan diseases through a proprietary artificial intelligence-based drug discovery technology and developing strategic partnerships with major research centers and pharmaceutical companies. The company was founded in 2009 in Barcelona, Spain.

The company successfully applies SOMAI PRO technology to identify effective drugs for any therapeutic area of interest in identifying new drug targets, as well as to identify new indications for drugs. The main strength of AI technology is that it identifies the mechanisms of action (biological activity) of molecules and determines their non-structural analogues with similar biological activity. This is a key differentiating factor compared to most other AI-based approaches, which use methods based on data mining, structural similarity, or target structure. The technology reduces drug development costs and time, providing a high level of success and reliable patent protection.

== Products ==
SOM Biotech has an extensive portfolio of products that is focused mainly on neurology and also in other therapeutic areas.

In 2013, the company licensed its first asset, SOM0777, indicated for glioblastoma to Argon Pharma, a pharmaceutical company based in Barcelona, Spain.

In 2014, SOM Biotech initiated a phase IIa proof of concept study in humans, regarding its compound SOM0226 for treatment of TTR Amyloidosis, with Vall d´Hebron Hospital in Barcelona. During the end of 2013, the United States of America Food and Drug Administration (FDA) granted orphan drug designation to SOM0226. After successful completion of the clinical development phase IIa, SOM has granted a worldwide exclusive license to Corino Therapeutics. Inc., a New York-based pharmaceutical company.

In 2017, SOM Biotech entered into an agreement with Nippon Chemiphar (Japan) to collaborate for the SOM3355 program for the treatment of chorea in Huntington's disease. From 2018 to 2019, SOM Biotech successfully performed a clinical proof-of-concept phase IIa study assessing SOM3355 efficacy and safety in reducing chorea in Huntington’s disease.

SOM Biotech's clinical pipeline includes programs for TTR Amyloidosis, chorea in Huntington's disease, Phenylketonuria, COVID-19. The preclinical pipeline includes programs for Niemann Pick Type C, Parkinson's, Tay-Sachs disease. The early development pipeline of the company consists of 20 orphan disease programs.

== Awards ==
In 2013, SOM Biotech was the winner of the Entrepreneur XXI Award in biotechnology in the category "Growth", an initiative for innovation projects promoted by La Caixa together with the Spanish Ministry of Industry, Energy and Tourism, and ENISA. This award are recognized as one of the most consolidated initiatives to support entrepreneurship in Spain. In 2018, for its commitment to achieving medical advances for the benefit of patients with orphan diseases and its exponential growth that year, SOM Biotech received the XXI Century Technology Award in the category "Technological Milestone". In 2020 and 2021 SOM Biotech was included in the list of the Spanish startups and scaleups to watch in, published by Sifted, a Financial Times backed company.

== Financing ==
In 2016, SOM Biotech raises €2 million in round of funding with 18 international investors, most of which are executives from the pharmaceutical sector, from various countries around the world such as Monaco, United Kingdom, Poland, Republic Czech, United States, South Korea, Hong Kong, India and Spain. In 2019, the company closed another financing round of 7 million euros. The operation has been led by a company owned by a European family with a long tradition in the pharmaceutical sector
