= Teide =

Volcano and highest mountain in Spain

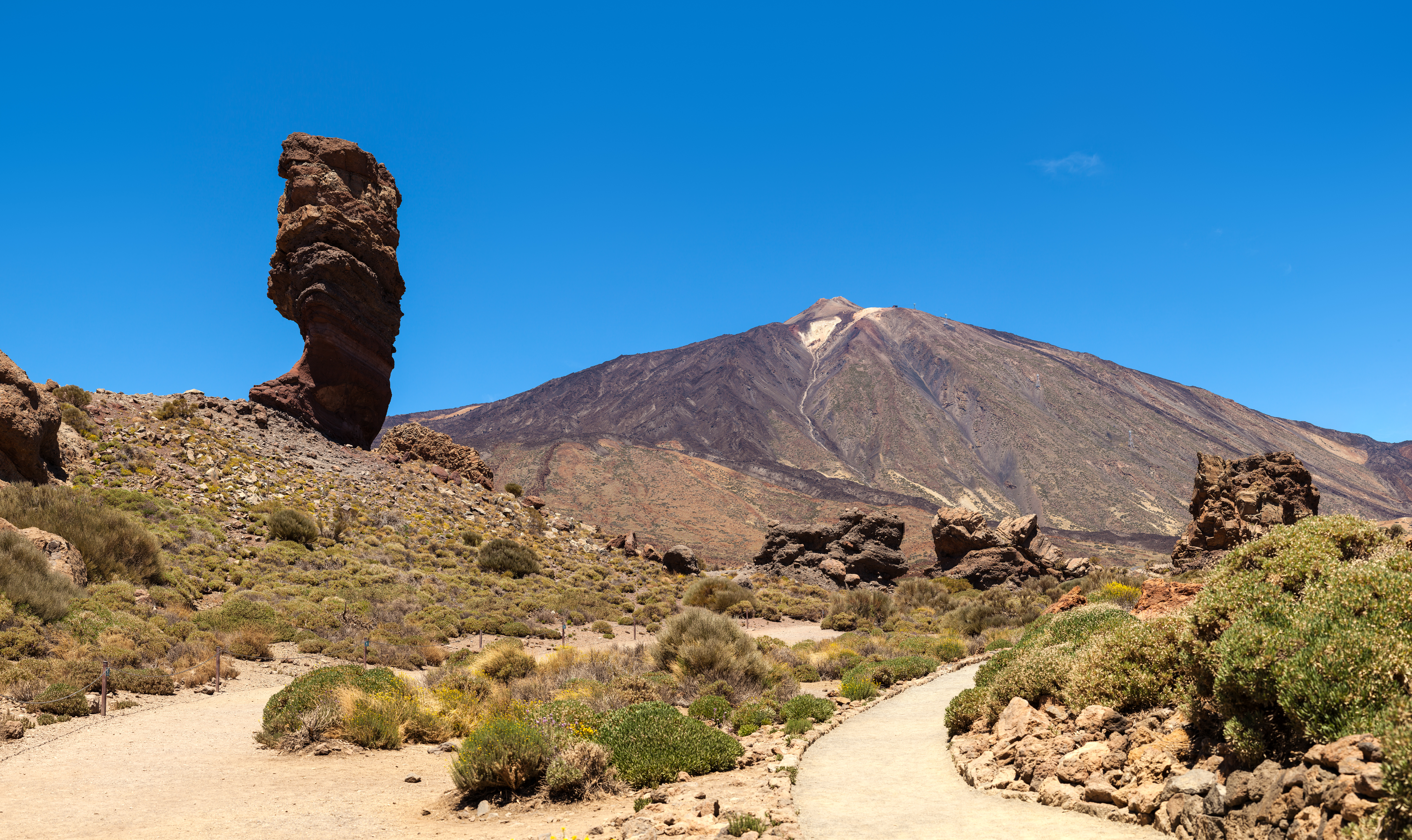
- Teide volcano and Roque Cinchado (left)

Highest point
- Elevation: 3,715 m (12,188 ft)
- Prominence: 3,715 m (12,188 ft); Ranked 40th
- Listing: Country high point Ultra; Ribu
- Coordinates: 28°16′23″N 16°38′22″W

Geography
- Location within Canary Islands
- Location: Tenerife, Canary Islands, Spain

Geology
- Mountain type: Stratovolcano atop basalt shield volcano
- Last eruption: 18 November 1909

Climbing
- First ascent: 1582
- Easiest route: Scramble

This 3D panoramic view of Teide was created using SRTM data (160% elevation).

Teide (Spanish: El Teide) or Mount Teide (Pico del Teide, pronounced [ˈpiko ðel ˈtejðe]; 'Peak of Teide') is an active stratovolcano on the Spanish island of Tenerife, part of the Canary Islands. Its summit (at 3,715 m (12,188 ft)) (Note: Many published sources give Teide's height as 3,718 m (12,198 ft) above sea level, but IGN (the national mapping agency of the Government of Spain) gives Teide's height as 3715 m on the 2012, 2015 and 2019 versions of its "Mapa Físico de España" ("Physical Map of Spain"), as well as in its "MTN25 edición impresa: 2" ("National Topographic Map 1:25000 second edition") map series of Tenerife, published in 2014 and in its "Altitudes de las provincias" (list of highest points in the provinces of Spain).) is the highest point in Spain and the highest of any island in the Atlantic Ocean. Measured from its base on the ocean floor, Teide reaches a total height of 7,500 m (24,600 ft), making it the third-tallest volcano in the world; (Note: After Mauna Kea and Mauna Loa at 10.2 km (6.3 mi).) UNESCO and NASA also rank it as Earth's third-tallest volcanic structure. (Note: Teide is Earth's third-tallest volcanic structure only if the island of Hawaii is considered to be a single structure.) Its elevation above sea level makes Tenerife the tenth-highest island in the world.

Teide began forming approximately 170,000 years ago as a result of volcanic activity following a catastrophic landslide. Its base lies within the Las Cañadas caldera, the remains of an older, eroded, and extinct volcano, at an elevation of about 2,190 m (7,190 ft) above sea level. Teide is an active volcano, with its most recent eruption occurring in late 1909 from the El Chinyero vent on the northwestern Santiago rift. Due to its history of destructive eruptions and its proximity to several large towns, including Garachico, Icod de los Vinos, and Puerto de la Cruz, the United Nations Committee for Disaster Mitigation designated Teide as a Decade Volcano. Together with Pico Viejo and Montaña Blanca, Teide forms the Central Volcanic Complex of Tenerife.

The volcano and its surroundings form Teide National Park, which covers an area of 18,900 hectares (47,000 acres) and was designated a UNESCO World Heritage Site in 2007. Teide is the most visited national park in both Spain and Europe, and ranks among the top 10 most visited national parks worldwide, attracting over 5 million visitors annually. In 2024, the park received 5,242,653 visitors, setting a historical record. The Teide Observatory, a major international astronomical facility, is situated on the mountain’s slopes. Additionally, the volcano has frequently appeared in films, television series, and programs set on the island of Tenerife.

== Name and legends ==
Before the 1496 Spanish colonization of Tenerife, the native Guanches referred to a powerful figure living in the volcano, which carries light, power and the sun. El Pico del Teide is the modern Spanish name.

Teide was a sacred mountain for the aboriginal Guanches, so it was considered a mythological mountain, as Mount Olympus was to the ancient Greeks. When going on to Teide during an eruption, it was customary for the Guanches to light bonfires to scare Guayota. Guayota is often represented as a black dog, accompanied by his host of demons (Tibicenas).

The Guanches also believed that Teide held up the sky. Many hiding places found in the mountains contain the remains of stone tools and pottery. These have been interpreted as being ritual deposits to counter the influence of evil spirits, like those made by the Berbers of Kabylie. The Guanches believed the mountain to be the place that housed the forces of evil and the most evil figure, Guayota.

Guayota shares features similar to other powerful deities inhabiting volcanoes, such as the goddess Pele of Hawaiian mythology, who lives in the volcano Kīlauea and is regarded by the native Hawaiians as responsible for the eruptions of the volcano. The same was true for the ancient Greeks and Romans, who believed that Vulcano and Mount Etna were chimneys of the foundry of the fire god Hephaestus (Vulcan in Latin).

In 1492, when Christopher Columbus arrived at the island of Tenerife, his crew claimed to see flames coming from the highest mountain of the island (Teide).

== Geography ==
=== Location ===
Teide is located on Tenerife, the largest island of the Canary Islands, situated in the Atlantic Ocean, 290 km (180 mi) northwest of the coast of Western Sahara. The volcano is located in a central position on the Tenerife island. Administratively, the Canary Islands are a Spanish autonomous community. Teide itself is located within the commune of La Orotava in the province of Santa Cruz de Tenerife.

=== Topography ===
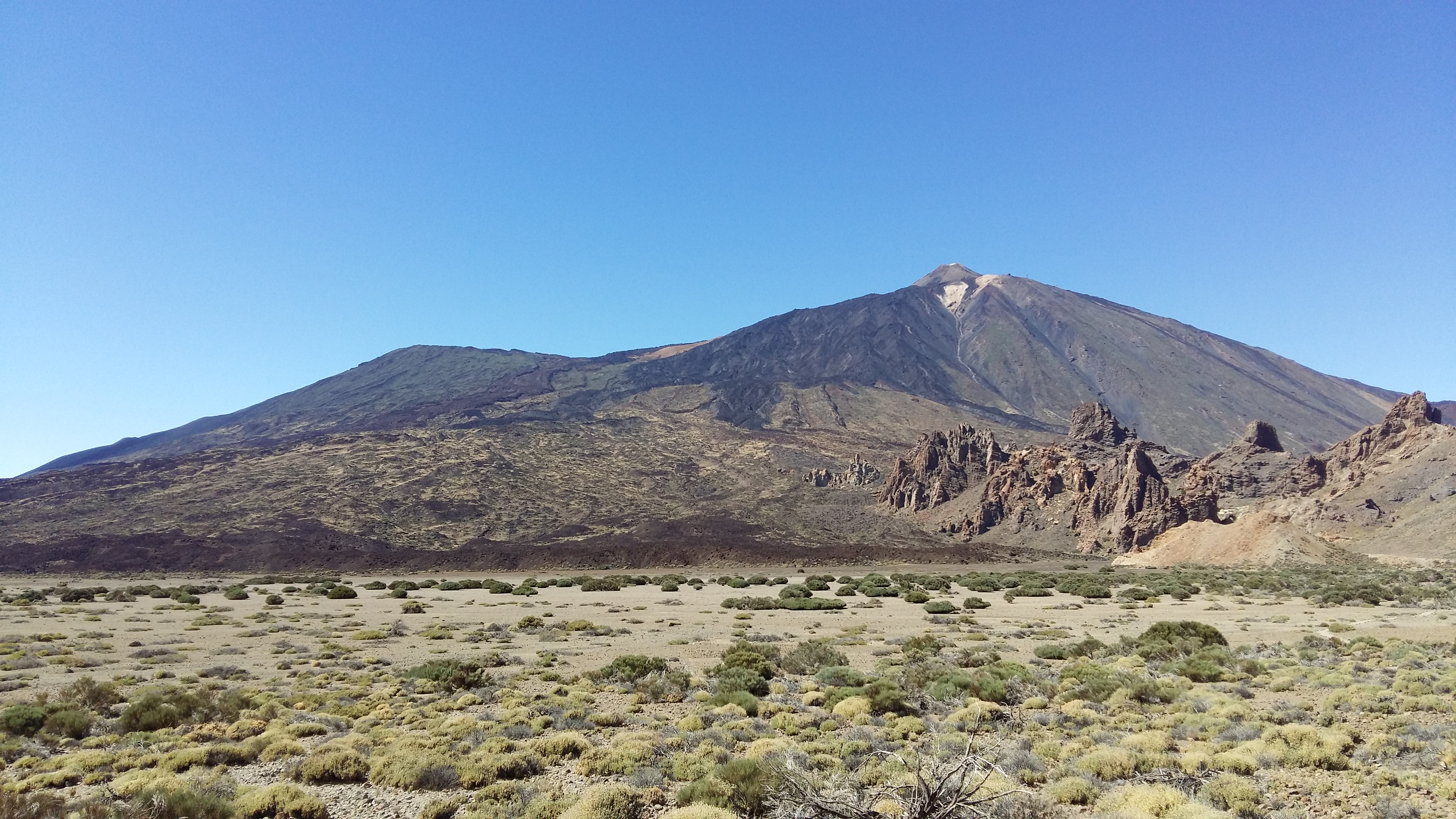
Teide (right) and Pico Viejo (left)

Before reliable measurements were available, Teide was considered by Europeans to be the highest mountain on Earth for a long time. With a height of 3,715 m (12,188 ft), it is the highest point in Spain and the Atlantic Ocean. If it is measured from the ocean floor, it surpasses 7,000 m (23,000 ft), making it the third highest volcanic structure in the world after Mauna Loa and Mauna Kea, both on the island of Hawaii.

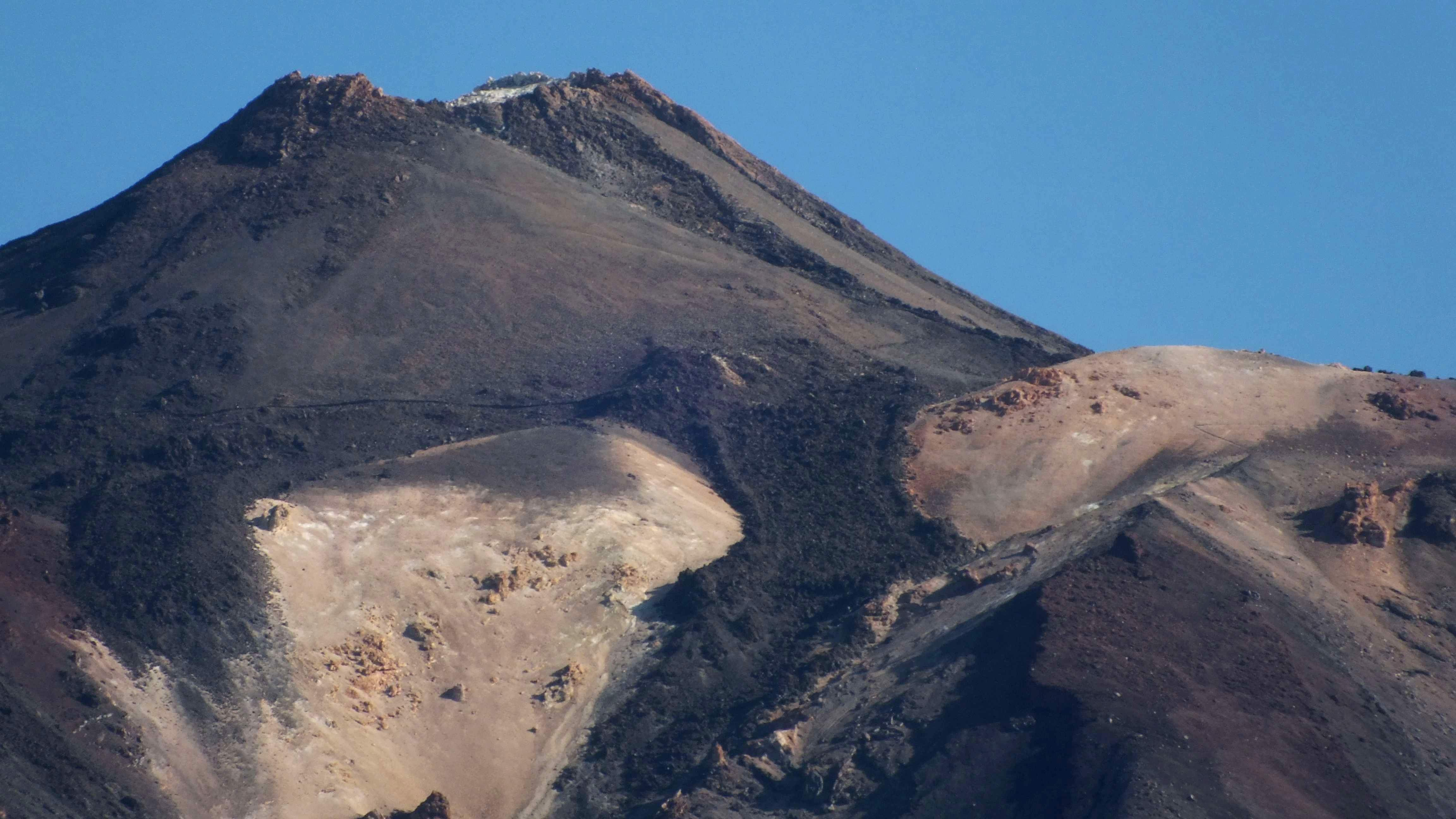
El Pitón, a small volcanic cone at the summit of Teide

The formation of the mountain is marked by its long and complex volcanic history. It rests on the Las Cañadas caldera, an asymmetric depression 15 km (9.3 mi) in diameter in the form of a horseshoe which opens to the north. The floor of the caldera varies from 2,000 to 2,200 m (6,600 to 7,200 ft) in altitude, although its sides in the south rise to 2,717 m (8,914 ft), the level of Mount Guajara. To the north, the slopes of Teide continue directly to the ocean, with a break in the slope at around 2,000 m (6,600 ft). The volcano of Teide itself can be described as a volcanic cone 8 km (5.0 mi) in diameter at its base, with quite steep slopes, approximately 20 to 40° for a total volume of 150 to 200 km^{3} (36 to 48 cu mi). The summit is marked by a small volcanic cone, about 150 m (490 ft) high, named El Pitón, which has a summit crater 100 m (330 ft) in diameter and 30 m (98 ft) deep. A secondary cone, named Pico Viejo emerges on the western slopes of the main peak; its crater is much larger, with a diameter of 800 m (2,600 ft) and a depth of 140 m (460 ft). It rises to 3,414 m (11,201 ft), but with a low prominence, not more than 100 m (330 ft) higher than the slopes of the main volcano. On the outside of these two main peaks, the relief Teide also has some smaller formations, of which the most notable are Roques Blancos, Pico Cabras, and Montaña Blanca, situated next to the base of Teide.

The slopes of Teide are covered in radial ravines. However, the majority of the ravines have been covered by recent lava flows, the Lavas Negras, in particular the northern part. The main ravines, with prominence around 100 m (330 ft), are located on the south slope: from east to west, the Corredor Mario, Corredor La Corbata and Corredor La Bola.

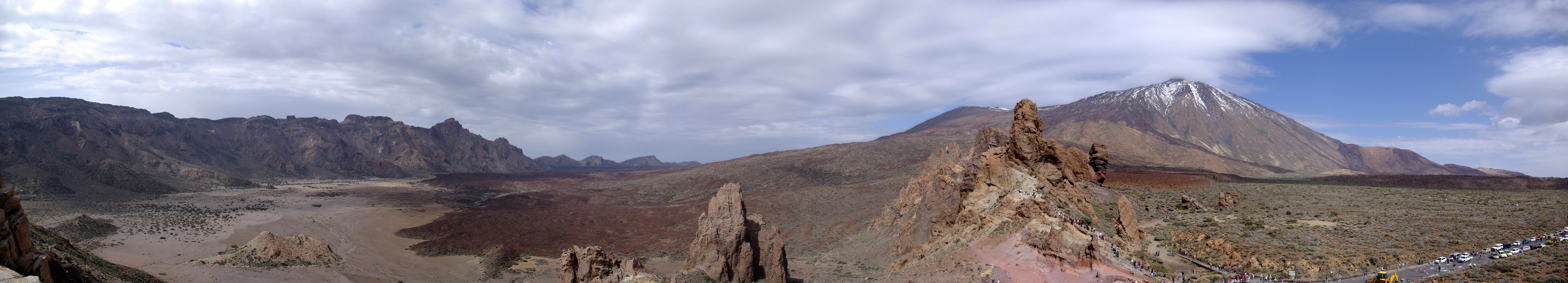
Panorama of Teide from Los Roques de Garcia

Map of Teide and its caldera

=== Climate ===
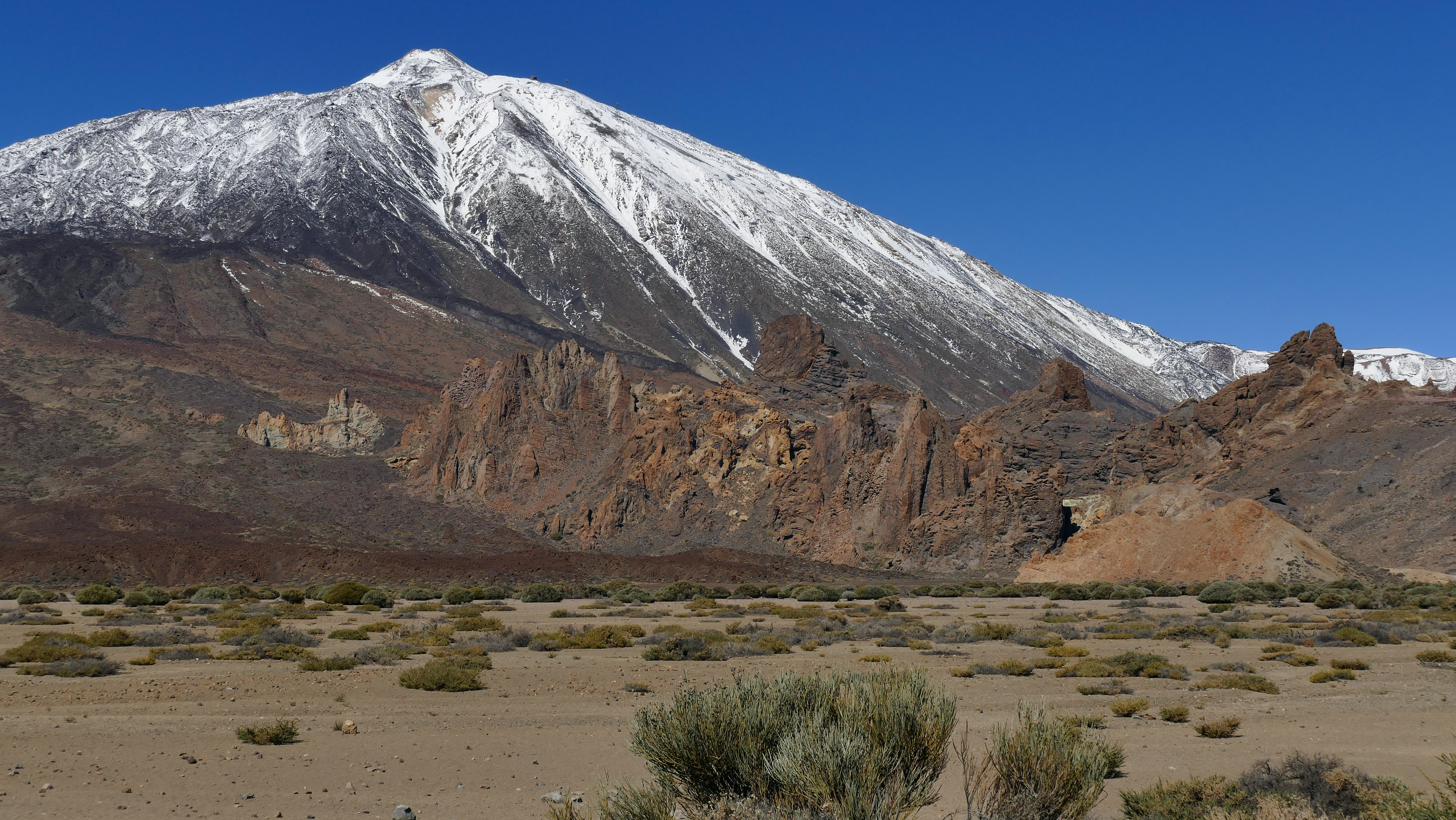
Snow on the peaks of Teide

Despite their proximity to the Sahara, the Canary Islands have a relatively temperate climate. The sunshine duration is very high due to Teide's subtropical latitude and proximity to the Azores high, and sees a very high UV index caused by the height of the peak (greater than 11 in the middle of the summer). This sunshine of around 3,450 h per year is partially compensated by the Canary current, a relatively cold ocean current which makes the climate more temperate. The situation at the level of Teide and its caldera is very unlike the climate at its base. In effect, the climate of Tenerife is marked by an inversion layer around at an altitude of 1,000 m (3,300 ft), isolating the high-altitude zones from ocean influences present at the lower altitudes. This leads to a more continental climate on Teide, with strong changes in temperature over the course of the day (typically on the order of 15 °C) and in the course of the year (with a range of -15 °C in winter to 30 °C in the summer).

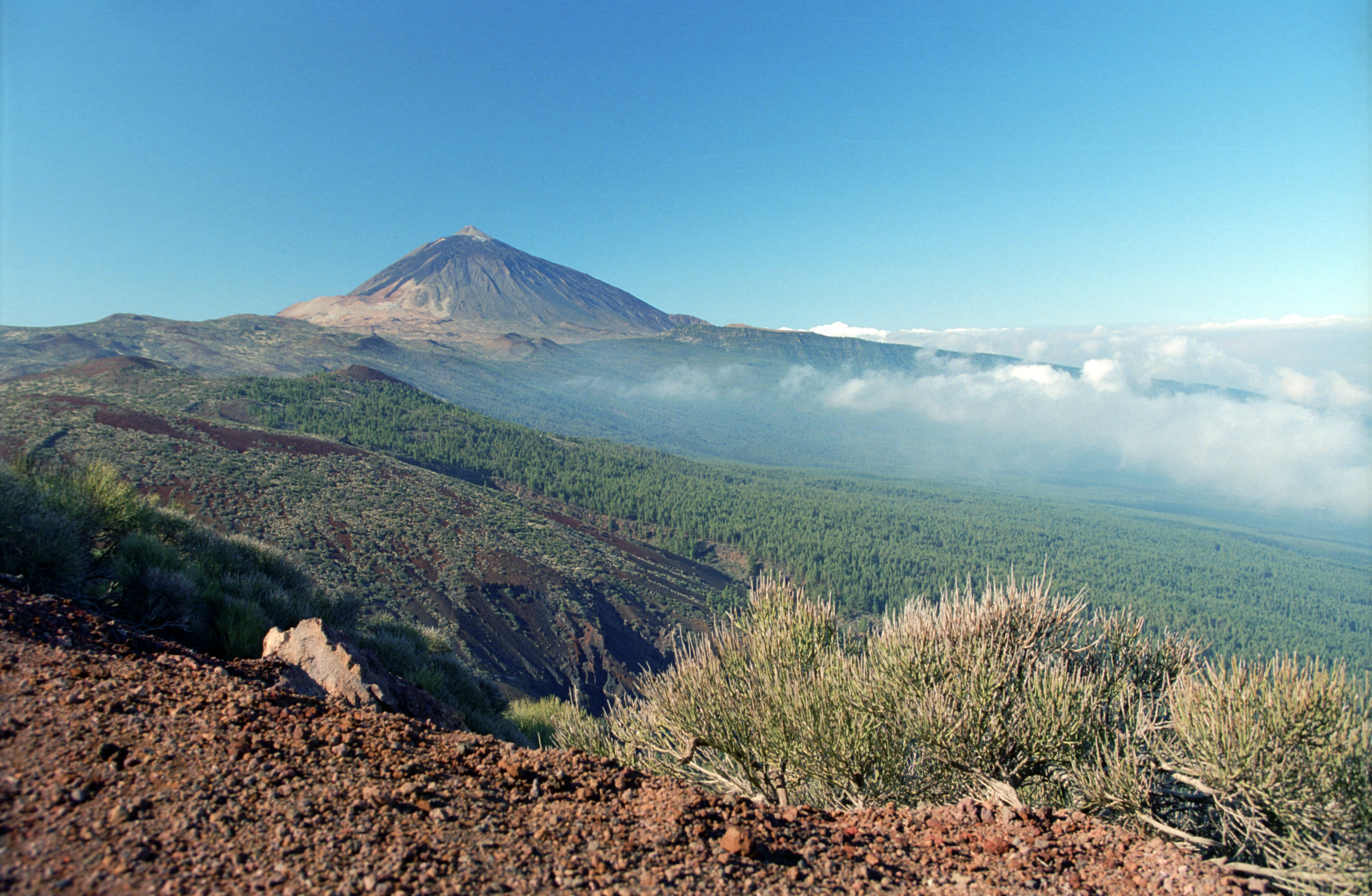
Sea of clouds in the northern part of Tenerife, watering the leafy part of the island but leaving Teide and its caldera in an arid climate.

Humidity is also very affected by this inversion layer. The presence of the Azores high in the northwest of the Canaries in summer induces relatively constant winds (trade winds) blowing from the northeast to the southwest. These winds carry moisture across the Atlantic and deliver rain to the north of Tenerife, forming in particular a dense layer of clouds between 800 and 1,600 ft (240 and 490 m) of altitude. But the inversion layer also stops these clouds from rising, and the climate is thus very dry below the level of Teide. The precipitation in the caldera is thus less than 500 mm per year, the majority falling in the winter, and in total, around one third in the form of snow. Variation can be quite high from one year to the next. Meanwhile the peak of Teide is covered by wave clouds, forming the "hat of Teide" (Toca del Teide) which was probably confused with signs of an eruption by sailors.

Climate data for Izaña Teide Observatory (altitude: 2,371 metres (7,779 feet))
Month	Jan	Feb	Mar	Apr	May	Jun	Jul	Aug	Sep	Oct	Nov	Dec	Year
Mean daily maximum °C (°F)	7.5 (45.5)	8.0 (46.4)	10.2 (50.4)	11.8 (53.2)	14.5 (58.1)	18.9 (66.0)	23.0 (73.4)	22.6 (72.7)	18.6 (65.5)	14.3 (57.7)	11.1 (52.0)	8.8 (47.8)	14.1 (57.4)
Daily mean °C (°F)	4.3 (39.7)	4.7 (40.5)	6.4 (43.5)	7.6 (45.7)	10.1 (50.2)	14.4 (57.9)	18.5 (65.3)	18.2 (64.8)	14.5 (58.1)	10.6 (51.1)	7.8 (46.0)	5.6 (42.1)	10.2 (50.4)
Mean daily minimum °C (°F)	1.1 (34.0)	1.3 (34.3)	2.7 (36.9)	3.5 (38.3)	5.8 (42.4)	9.9 (49.8)	14.0 (57.2)	13.8 (56.8)	10.4 (50.7)	6.9 (44.4)	4.5 (40.1)	2.4 (36.3)	6.4 (43.4)
Average rainfall mm (inches)	47 (1.9)	67 (2.6)	58 (2.3)	18 (0.7)	7 (0.3)	0 (0)	0 (0)	5 (0.2)	13 (0.5)	37 (1.5)	54 (2.1)	60 (2.4)	366 (14.5)
Average rainy days (≥ 1.0 mm)	4.5	4.0	4.1	2.7	1.1	0.2	0.1	0.5	1.6	3.7	4.4	5.6	32.5
Average relative humidity (%)	50	54	48	45	40	32	25	30	43	55	54	52	44
Mean monthly sunshine hours	226	223	260	294	356	382	382	358	295	259	220	218	3,473
Source: Agencia Estatal de Meteorología (1981–2010)

== Geology ==
=== The Canary Islands ===
Teide is a stratovolcano created by the same forces which formed the Canary Islands. The islands are aligned relatively east to west, but continue to the northeast in a series of undersea mountains which are part of the same volcanic region as the Canary Islands. Dating indicates that the age of these islands changes from east to west, with the older islands and undersea mountains (seamounts) to the east and more recent ones to the west. This makes Fuerteventura and Lanzarote the oldest islands, from 20.2 Mya, and El Hierro the youngest, from 1.1 Mya. Counting the undersea mountains, Lars (a seamount) is the oldest, from 68 Mya. The Madeira islands, located not far to the north of the Canary islands and also volcanic, have many islands and undersea mountains aligned in the same general direction and with similar dates. This pattern is consistent with archipelagoes which have formed over a hotspot such as the Hawaiian Islands. However, there are many differences with Hawaii. First, the Hawaiian Islands are sinking rapidly (in geological time) into the ocean, forming atolls, yet the rate of subsidence is insignificant in the Canary Islands. If the Canary islands were sinking at the same rate as the Hawaiian islands, Teide would be actually below sea-level. But one of the most fundamental differences, and which lends doubt to the theory of a hotspot, is the fact that the volcanic activity is not constrained to the most recent island, but continues through all the islands in the chain. This has aroused an intense debate in the scientific community, which continues to a certain extent today. One hypothesis which allows reconciliation of these observations is the presence in the Earth's mantle of a convection cell which enters one part of the magma more towards the east, thus activating the old islands. According to this hypothesis, the magma would be also responsible for scattered volcanic activity to the northwest of the African continent to the south of Spain.

=== Formation of Tenerife ===
The formation of Tenerife began a little less than 12 Mya. It started with the formation of a shield volcano centered not far from Teide itself, with volcanic activity which endured to around 8.9 Mya. The volcanic activity then stopped, and the volcano underwent some collapses in the process of erosion. One new shield volcano formed between 6 and 5 Mya, more to the west, in Teno then another in Anaga, to the east, between 4.9 and 3.9 Mya. Together, these three shield volcanoes represent 90% of the volume of Tenerife. The lavas are basalts, basic rocks (i.e. having a low content of silica) and therefore very fluid, this explains the characteristic form of shield volcanoes.

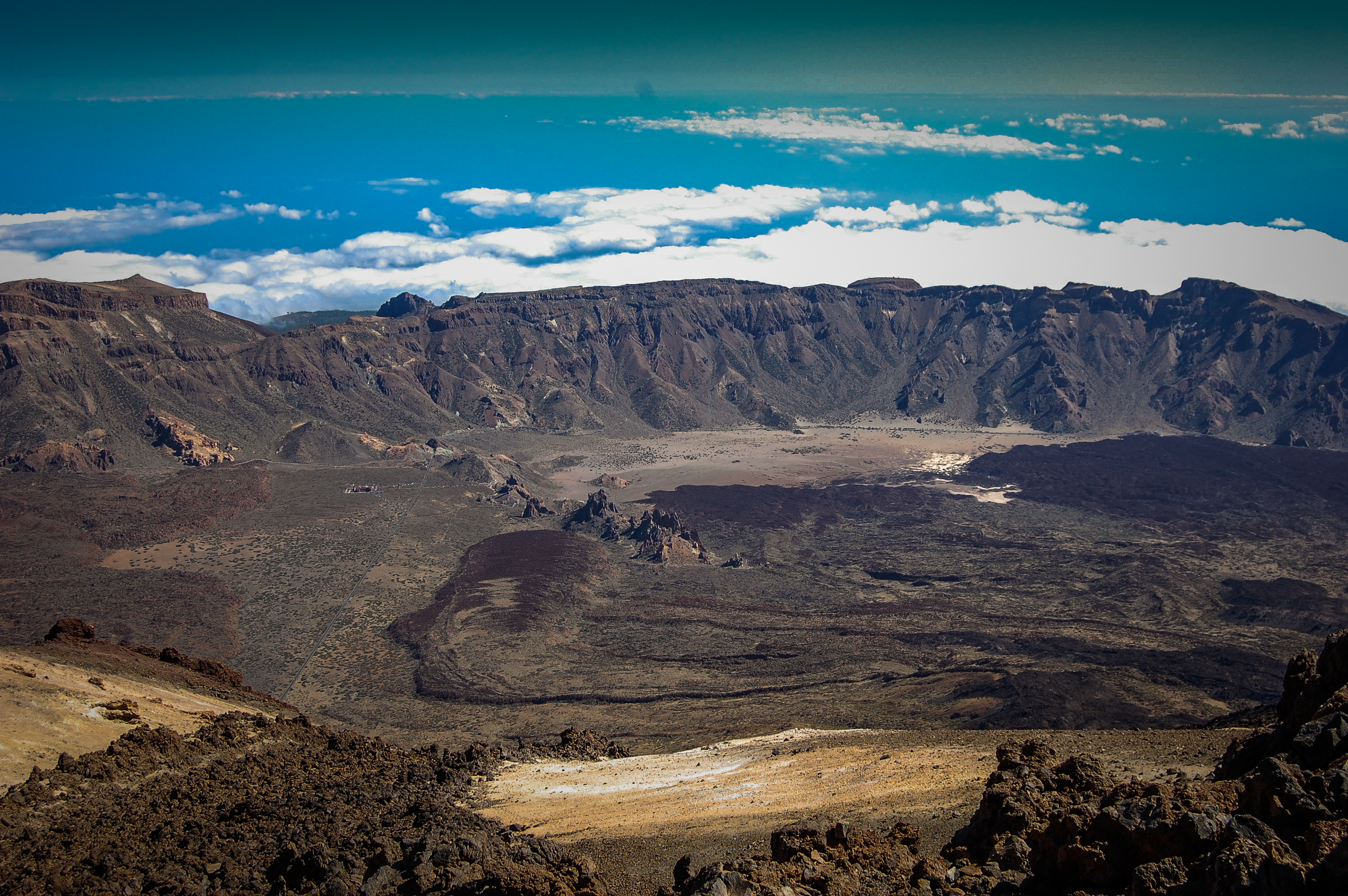
The cliffs of the caldera mark eroded front of the landslides, and are the remainder of the slopes of the Las Cañadas volcano.

Around 3.5 Mya, after a pause of 5.5 million years, volcanic activity resumed to the level of the first shield volcano. This is the start of the rejuvenation phase, forming the volcano Las Cañadas. It was also in this period that the volcanic activity began in the rifts of the island, formed by radial fractures due to the thrust of magma in the central volcano. The eruptions of Las Cañadas were initially basic and fluid lavas, but they differentiated over time (trachybasalts and phonolites), which gave place to more explosive eruptions. Around 200,000 years ago, the peak of the volcano was swept away in a giant land slide to the north, forming the caldera of Las Cañadas. These massive landslides were quite frequent and were in part cased by the fractures of the rifts. Besides the caldera, the landslides were also responsible for the valley of La Orotava (around 600,000 years ago) and Güímar (around 850,000 years ago).

=== Formation of Teide ===
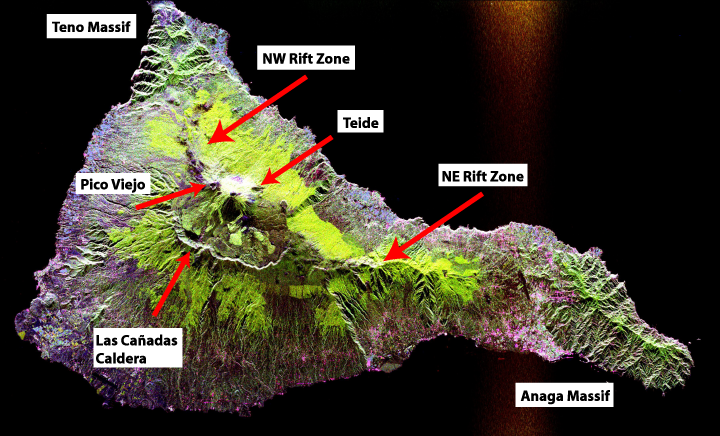
Synthetic-aperture radar image of Tenerife with different volcanic massifs labeled

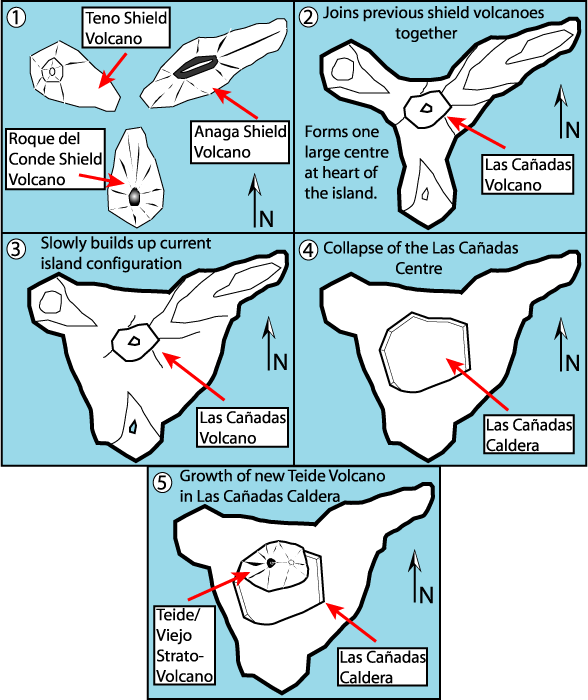
Summary diagram for formation of Tenerife through to current Teide volcano

The stratovolcanoes Teide and Pico Viejo (Old Peak, although it is in fact younger than Teide) are the most recent centres of activity on the volcanic island of Tenerife, which is the largest (2,058 km^{2} or 795 sq mi) and highest (3,715 m or 12,188 ft) island in the Canaries. It has a complex volcanic history. The formation of the island and the development of the current Teide volcano took place in the five stages shown in the diagram on the right.

==== Stage one ====
Like the other Canary Islands, and volcanic ocean islands in general, Tenerife was built by accretion of large shield volcanoes, three of which developed in a relatively short period. This early shield stage volcanism formed the bulk of the emerged part of Tenerife. The shield volcanoes date back to the Miocene and early Pliocene and are preserved in three isolated and deeply eroded massifs: Anaga (to the northeast), Teno (to the northwest) and Roque del Conde (to the south). Each shield was apparently constructed in less than three million years, and the entire island in about eight million years.

==== Stages two and three ====
The initial juvenile stage was followed by a period of 2–3 million years of eruptive quiescence and erosion. This cessation of activity is typical of the Canaries; La Gomera, for example, is currently at this stage. After this period of quiescence, the volcanic activity became concentrated within two large edifices: the central volcano of Las Cañadas, and the Anaga massif. The Las Cañadas volcano developed over the Miocene shield volcanoes and may have reached 40 km (25 mi) in diameter and 4,500 m (14,800 ft) in height.

==== Stage four ====
Around 160–220 thousand years ago the summit of the Las Cañadas I volcano collapsed, creating the Las Cañadas (Ucanca) caldera. Later, a new stratovolcano, Las Cañadas II, formed in the vicinity of Guajara and then catastrophically collapsed. Another volcano, Las Cañadas III, formed in the Diego Hernandez sector of the caldera. All of the Las Cañadas volcanoes attained a maximum altitude similar to that of Teide (which is sometimes referred to as the Las Cañadas IV volcano).

Two theories on the formation of the 16 km × 9 km (9.9 mi × 5.6 mi) caldera exist. The first states that the depression is the result of a vertical collapse of the volcano triggered by the emptying of shallow magma chambers at around sea level under the Las Cañadas volcano after large-volume explosive eruptions. The second theory is that the caldera was formed by a series of lateral gravitational collapses similar to those described in Hawaii. Evidence for the latter theory has been found in both onshore observations and marine geology studies.

==== Stage five ====
From around 160,000 years ago until the present day, the stratovolcanoes of Teide and Pico Viejo formed within the Las Cañadas caldera.

== Historical eruptions ==
Teide last erupted in 1909 from the El Chinyero vent, on the Santiago Ridge. Historical volcanic activity on the island is associated with vents on the Santiago or northwest rift (Boca Cangrejo in 1492, Montañas Negras in 1706, Narices del Teide or Chahorra in 1798, and El Chinyero in 1909) and the Cordillera Dorsal or northeast rift (Fasnia in 1704, Siete Fuentes and Arafo in 1705). The 1706 Montañas Negras eruption destroyed the town and principal port of Garachico, as well as several smaller villages.

Historical activity associated with the Teide and Pico Viejo stratovolcanoes occurred in 1798 from the Narices del Teide on the western flank of Pico Viejo. Eruptive material from Pico Viejo, Montaña Teide and Montaña Blanca partially fills the Las Cañadas caldera. The last explosive eruption involving the central volcanic centre was from Montaña Blanca around 2000 years ago. The last eruption within the Las Cañadas caldera occurred in 1798 from the Narices del Teide or Chahorra (Teide's Nostrils) on the western flank of Pico Viejo. The eruption was predominantly strombolian in style and most of the lava was ʻaʻā. This lava is visible beside the Vilaflor–Chio road.

Christopher Columbus reported seeing "a great fire in the Orotava Valley" as he sailed past Tenerife on his first voyage to the New World in 1492. This was interpreted as indicating that he had witnessed an eruption there. Radiometric dating of possible lavas indicates that in 1492 no eruption occurred in the Orotava Valley, but one did occur from the Boca Cangrejo vent.

The last summit eruption from Teide occurred about the year 850 AD, and this eruption produced the "Lavas Negras" or "Black Lavas" that cover much of the flanks of the volcano.

About 150,000 years ago, a much larger explosive eruption occurred, probably of Volcanic Explosivity Index 5. It created the Las Cañadas caldera, a large caldera at about 2,000 m (6,600 ft) above sea level, around 16 km (9.9 mi) from east to west and 9 km (5.6 mi) from north to south. At Guajara, on the south side of the structure, the internal walls rise as almost sheer cliffs from 2,100 to 2,715 m (6,890 to 8,907 ft). The 3,715 m (12,188 ft) summit of Teide itself, and its sister stratovolcano Pico Viejo (3,134 m (10,282 ft)), are both situated in the northern half of the caldera and are derived from eruptions later than this prehistoric explosion.

== Future eruptions ==
Future eruptions may include pyroclastic flows and surges similar to those that occurred at Mount Pelée, Merapi, Vesuvius, Etna, the Soufrière Hills, Mount Unzen and elsewhere. During 2003, there was an increase in seismic activity at the volcano and a rift opened on the north-east flank. No eruptive activity occurred but a quantity of material, possibly liquid, was emplaced into the edifice and is estimated to have a volume of ~10^{11} m^{3}. Such activity can indicate that magma is rising into the edifice, but is not always a precursor to an eruption.

Teide additionally is considered structurally unstable and its northern flank has a distinctive bulge. The summit of the volcano has a number of small active fumaroles emitting sulfur dioxide and other gases, including low levels of hydrogen sulfide.

A scientific assessment in 2006, published in the journal Eos, observed that "in the past 30,000 years, eruptions have occurred at a rate of only four to six per millennium, with a predominance (70%) of very low hazard, basaltic eruptions". The authors further commented that "the recent eruptive record, combined with the available petrological and radiometric data, provides a rather optimistic outlook on major volcanic hazards related to Teide and its rift zones, posing only very localized threats to the one million inhabitants of Tenerife and the 4.5 million annual visitors to Teide National Park." However, another study in 2009 concluded that Teide will probably erupt violently in the future, and that its structure is similar to that of Vesuvius and Etna. Thus the magnitude of the risk posed by Teide to the public remains a source of debate.

== Major climbs ==
In a publication of 1626, Sir Edmund Scory, who probably stayed on the island in the first decades of the 17th century, gives a description of Teide, in which he notes the suitable paths to the top and the effects its considerable height causes for travellers, indicating that the volcano had been accessed via different routes before the 17th century. In 1715 the English traveler J. Edens and his party made the ascent and reported their observations in the journal of the Royal Society in London.

After the Enlightenment, most of the expeditions that went to East Africa and the Pacific had Teide as one of the most rewarding targets. The expedition of Lord George Macartney, George Staunton and John Barrow in 1792 almost ended in tragedy, as a major snowstorm and rain swept over them and they failed to reach the peak of Teide, just barely getting past Montaña Blanca.

The German naturalist Alexander von Humboldt stopped in Tenerife during his voyage to South America in June 1799 and climbed Teide with his travelling companion Aimé Bonpland and some local guides. This excursion confirmed the volcanic origin of basalt.

During an expedition to Kilimanjaro, the German adventurer Hans Heinrich Joseph Meyer visited Teide in 1894 to observe ice conditions on the volcano. He described the two mountains as "two kings, one rising in the ocean and the other in the desert and steppes".

More recently in November 2017, Gema Hassen-Bey became the first Paralympic athlete in the world in a wheelchair to reach 3,000 meters altitude with only the momentum of her arms. Initially, Gema wanted to reach the top of Teide, although, due to weather conditions, she could not meet this objective.

== Flora and fauna ==
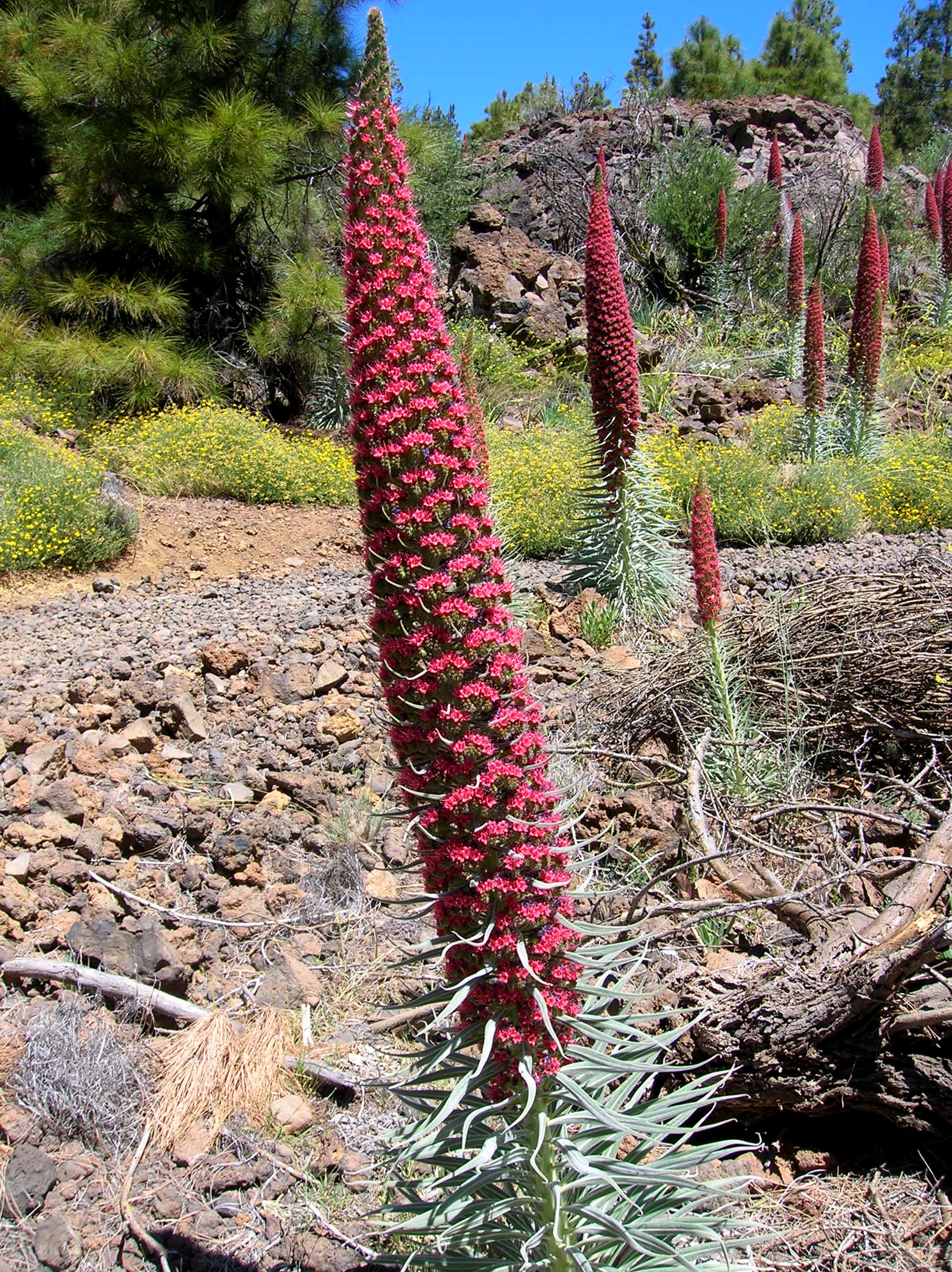
Echium wildpretii on Tenerife

The lava flows on the flanks of Teide weather to a very thin but nutrient- and mineral-rich soil that supports a wide variety of plant species. Vascular flora consists of 168 plant species, 33 of which are endemic to Tenerife.

Forests of Canary Island Pine (Pinus canariensis) with Canary Island juniper (Juniperus cedrus) occur from 1,000 to 2,100 metres (3,300–6,900 ft), covering the middle slopes of the volcano and reaching an alpine tree line 1,000 m (3,300 ft) lower than that of continental mountains at similar latitudes. Within the Las Cañadas caldera and at higher altitudes, plant species endemic to the Teide National Park include: the Teide white broom (Cytisus supranubius), which has white flowers; Descurainia bourgaeana, a shrubby crucifer with yellow flowers; the Canary Island wallflower (Erysimum scoparium), which has violet flowers; and the Teide bugloss (Echium wildpretii), whose red flowers form a pyramid up to 3 m (9.8 ft) in height. The Teide daisy (Argyranthemum teneriffae) can be found at altitudes close to 3,600 m (11,800 ft) above sea level, and the Teide violet (Viola cheiranthifolia) can be found right up to the summit, making it the highest flowering plant in Spain.

These plants are adapted to the tough environmental conditions on the volcano, such as high altitude, intense sunlight, extreme temperature variations, and lack of moisture. Adaptations include hemispherical forms, a downy or waxy cover, a reduction of the exposed leaf area, and high flower production. Flowering takes place in the late spring or early summer, in May and June.

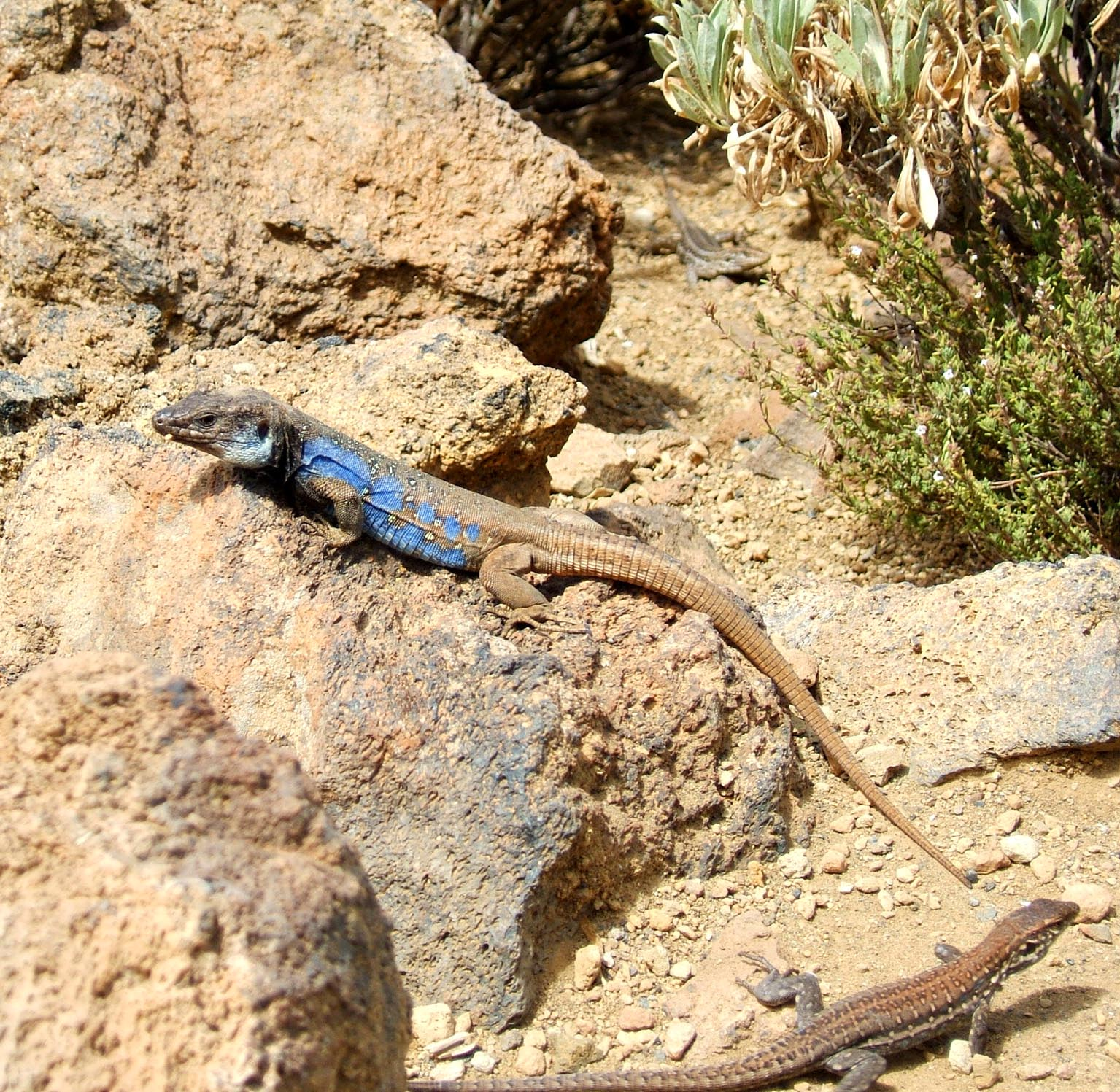
Southern Tenerife lizard (Gallotia galloti galloti)

Teide National Park contains a large number of invertebrate species, over 40% of which are endemic species, and 70 of which are found only in the National Park. The invertebrate fauna includes spiders, beetles, dipterans, hemipterans, and hymenopterae.

In contrast, Teide National Park has only a limited variety of vertebrate fauna. Ten species of bird nest there, including the blue chaffinch (Fringilla teydea), Berthelot's pipit (Anthus berthelotii berthelotii), the Atlantic canary (Serinus canaria) and a subspecies of kestrel (Falco tinnunculus canariensis).

Three endemic reptile species are found in the park: the Canary Island lizard (Gallotia galloti galloti), the Canary Island wall gecko (Tarentola delalandii), and the Canary Island skink (Chalcides viridanus viridanus).

The only mammals native to the park are bats, the most common of which is Leisler's bat (Nyctalus leisleri). Other mammals, such as the mouflon, the rabbit, the house mouse, the black rat, the feral cat, and the North African hedgehog, have all been introduced to the park.

== Shadow ==
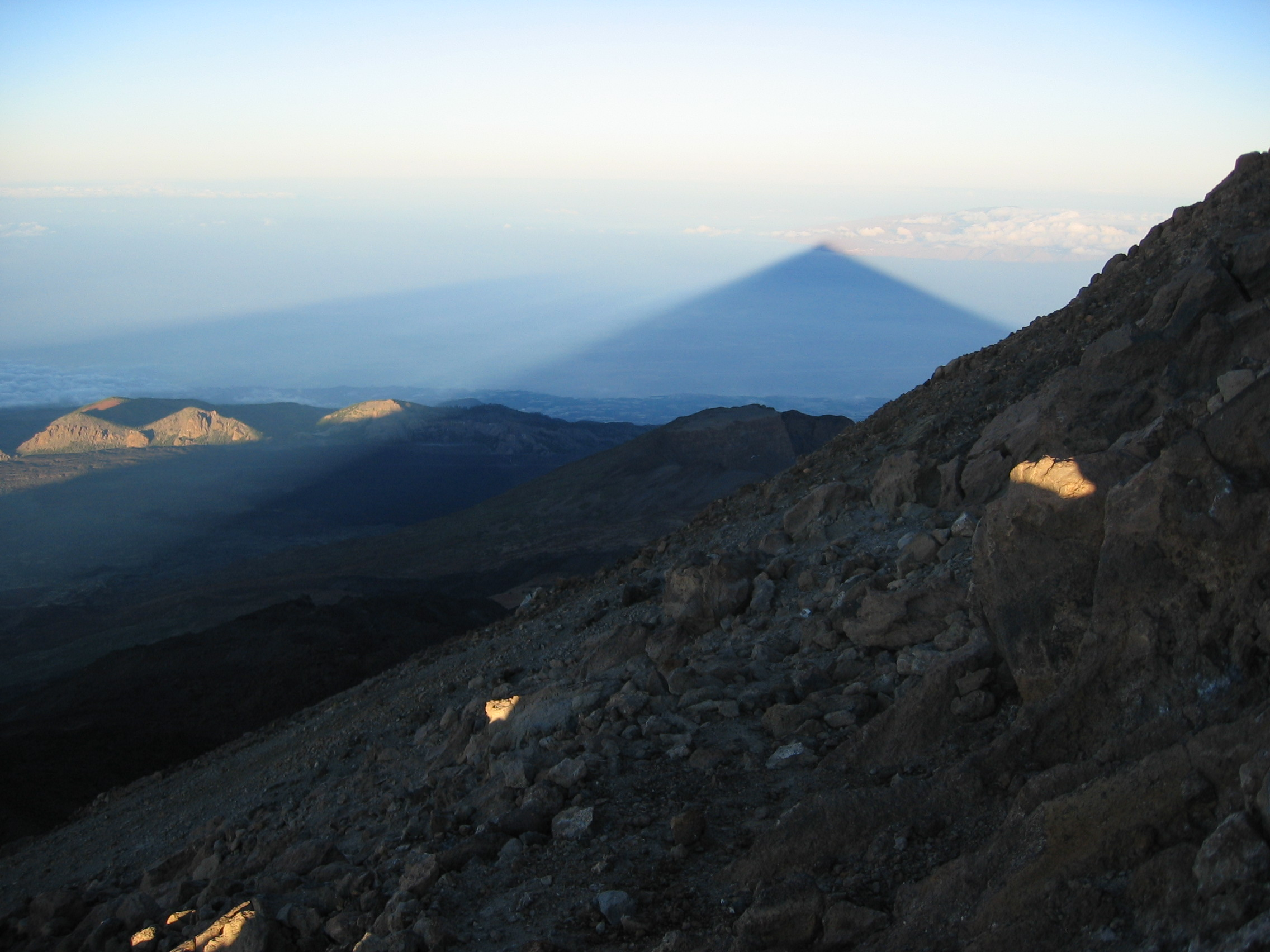
Shadow of Teide at dawn

Teide casts the world's largest shadow projected on the sea. The shadow is cast for more than 40 km (25 mi) from the mountain's summit, reaching as far as the island of La Gomera at dawn, and the island of Gran Canaria at sunset. The shadow has a perfectly triangular shape, even though Teide's silhouette does not; this is an effect of aerial perspective. Visitors and tourists climb to the top of the volcano at sunset to witness this phenomenon.

== Scientific use ==
Teide National Park is a useful volcanic reference point for studies related to Mars because of the similarities in their environmental conditions and geological formations. In 2010 a research team tested the Raman instrument at Las Cañadas del Teide in anticipation of its use in the 2016–2018 ESA-NASA ExoMars expedition. In June 2011 a team of researchers from the UK visited the park to test a method for looking for life on Mars and to search for suitable places to test new robotic vehicles in 2012.

== Access ==
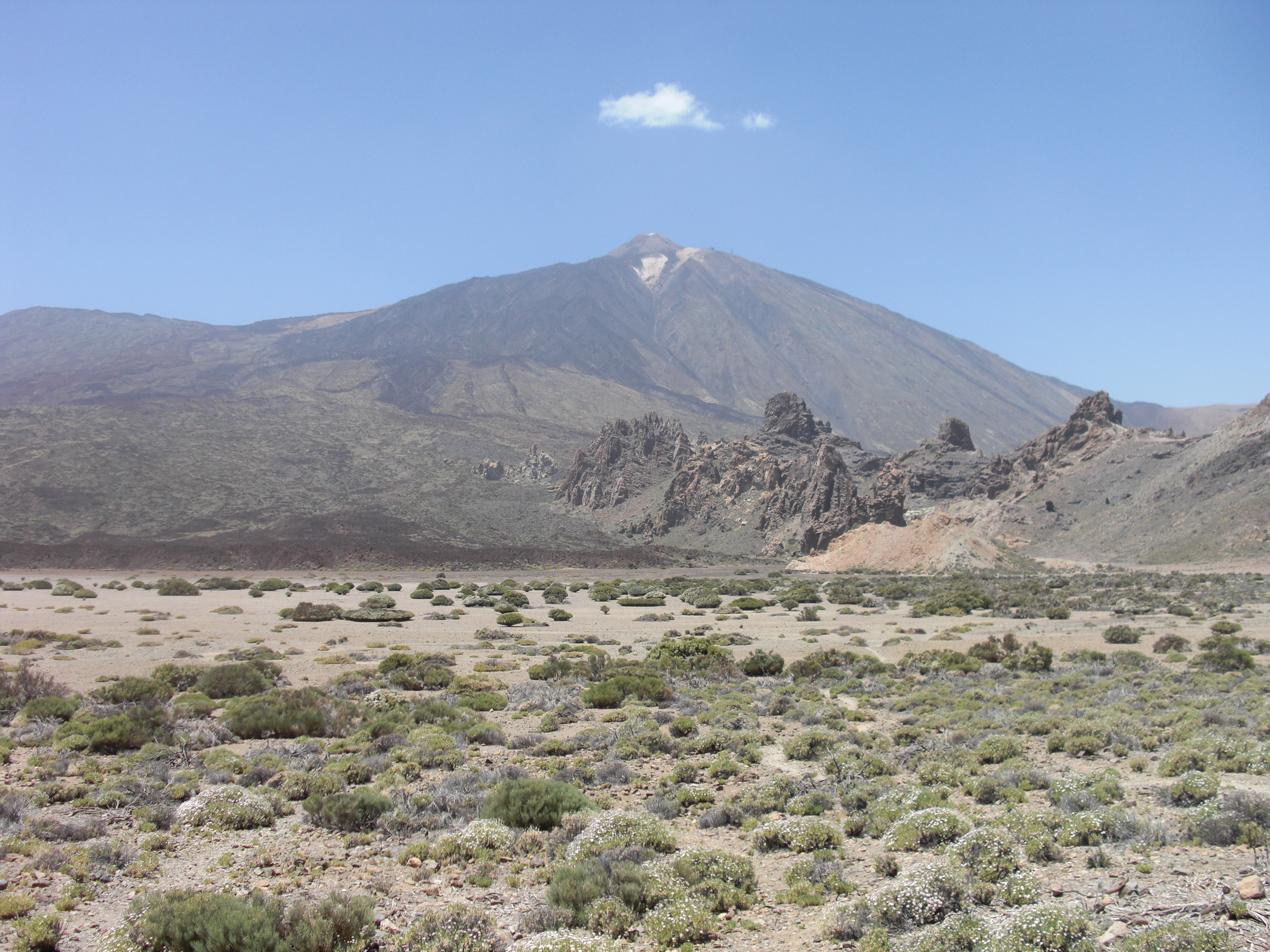
Teide from a distance with a cloud at the top

The volcano and its surroundings, including the whole of the Las Cañadas caldera, are protected in the Teide National Park. Access is by a public road running from northeast to southwest across the caldera. TITSA runs a return service to Teide once a day from both Puerto de la Cruz and Playa de las Americas. The park has a Parador (hotel) and a small chapel. A cable car goes from the roadside at 2,356 m (7,730 ft) most of the way to the summit, reaching 3,555 m (11,663 ft), carrying up to 38 passengers (34 in a high wind) and taking eight minutes to reach the summit. Access to the summit itself is restricted; a free permit is required to climb the last 200 m (660 ft). Several footpaths take hikers to the upper cable car terminal, and then onto the summit.

Because of the altitude, the air is significantly thinner than at sea level. This can cause people (especially with heart or lung conditions) to become light-headed or dizzy, to develop altitude sickness, and in extreme cases to lose consciousness. The only treatment is to return to lower altitudes and acclimatise.

== Astronomical observatory ==
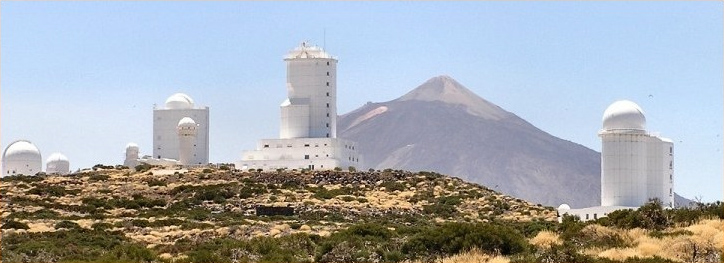
Teide Observatory

An astronomical observatory is located on the slopes of the mountain, taking advantage of the good weather, and the altitude, which puts it above most clouds, and promotes stable Astronomical seeing. The Teide Observatory is operated by the Instituto de Astrofísica de Canarias. It includes solar, radio and microwave telescopes, in addition to traditional optical night-time telescopes. Telescopes COAST and PIRATE are remotely operated by the Open University in the UK, which are accompanied by a weather station.

== Symbol ==
Teide is the main symbol of Tenerife and the most emblematic natural monument of the Canary Islands. An image of Teide, gushing flames, appears at the centre of Tenerife's coat of arms. Above the volcano appears St. Michael, the patron saint of Tenerife. The flag colors of the island are dark blue, traditionally identified with the sea that surrounds the island, and white for the whiteness of the snow-covered peaks of Teide during winter. The logo of the Cabildo de Tenerife (governing body of the island) includes a symbol of Teide in eruption.

Teide has been depicted frequently throughout history, from the earliest engravings made by European conquerors to typical Canarian craft objects, on the back of the 1000-peseta banknote, in oil paintings and on postcards.

In the Canary Islands, especially on Tenerife, Teide has cultural symbolism deeply rooted in traditions and history. It is popularly referred to as Padre Teide (Father Teide).

Coat of arms of Tenerife

Flag of Tenerife

Logo of the Cabildo de Tenerife.

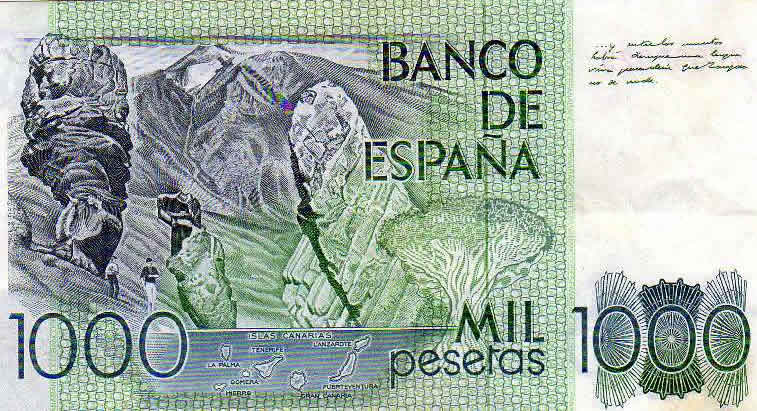
Spanish 1,000 peseta banknote (1979)

== Lunar mountain ==
Mons Pico, one of the Montes Teneriffe range of lunar mountains in the inner ring of the Mare Imbrium, was named by Johann Hieronymus Schröter after the Pico von Teneriffe, an 18th-century German name for Teide.

There is also a brown dwarf star located in the open star cluster of the Pleiades called Teide 1.

== See also ==
- Roque Cinchado
- Mount Guajara
- List of tallest mountains in the Solar System
- Pico do Fogo, a stratovolcano that has formed in a caldera of an oceanic island shield volcano
- Teide Trophy
