= Battle of the Somme (disambiguation) =

The Battle of the Somme most commonly refers to the Anglo-French offensive in 1916 during World War I.

The campaign was later divided into a series of battles. According to official nomenclature, two offensives in 1918 also use this name:

- the German offensive codenamed Operation Michael, known by the British as the First Battle of the Somme, 1918.
- the Second Battle of the Somme (1918), the second phase of the final British offensive of the war

Battle of the Somme may otherwise refer to:

- The Battle of the Somme (film), a 1916 documentary and propaganda film
- The Battle of the Somme (pipe tune), a slip jig written for pipes by William Lawrie in 1916, shortly before he died in the eponymous battle.
