= Pico Viejo =

Volcano on Tenerife, Canary Islands, Spain

Coordinates: 28.262°N 16.668°W

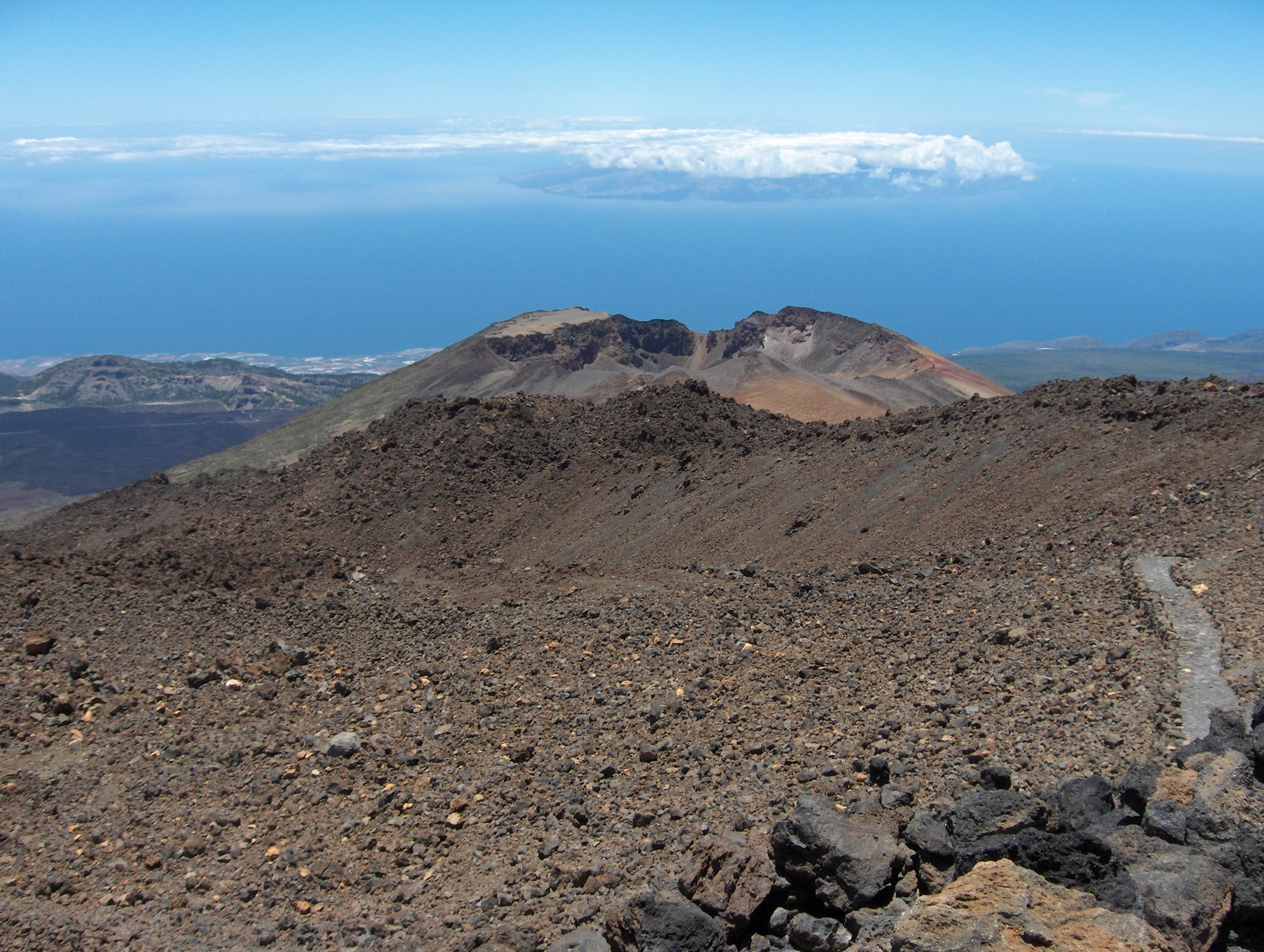
Crater of Pico Viejo

View inside crater of Pico Viejo

Pico Viejo is a volcano located on the island of Tenerife in Canary Islands, Spain. It is the second highest peak of Tenerife and the Canary Islands (after Teide), with a summit height of 3,129 m above sea level, and a crater approximately 720 metres in diameter.

The volcano is part of the Teide volcanic complex, which began forming about 200,000 years ago in the center of Tenerife. Its crater is one of the satellite craters around Teide.

It last erupted in 1798, and it is estimated that it ejected around 12 million m³ of lava over three months forming a black colored surface, which is different from the rest of the volcano area, which are known as the Teide noses.

== Climbing routes ==
Pico Viejo can be climbed from several sides: from the road in the west and south-west, from the hotel Parador, and from Mount Teide.

The shortest approach from the west and south-west side is if you start from the parking Narices del Teide. From the Parador side, the route starts at the parking area.

== See also ==
- Mount Guajara
- Teide National Park
