= Laboratorio de Energía Solar Termoeléctrica =

Abandoned dish structure

Solar Thermoelectric Energy Laboratory
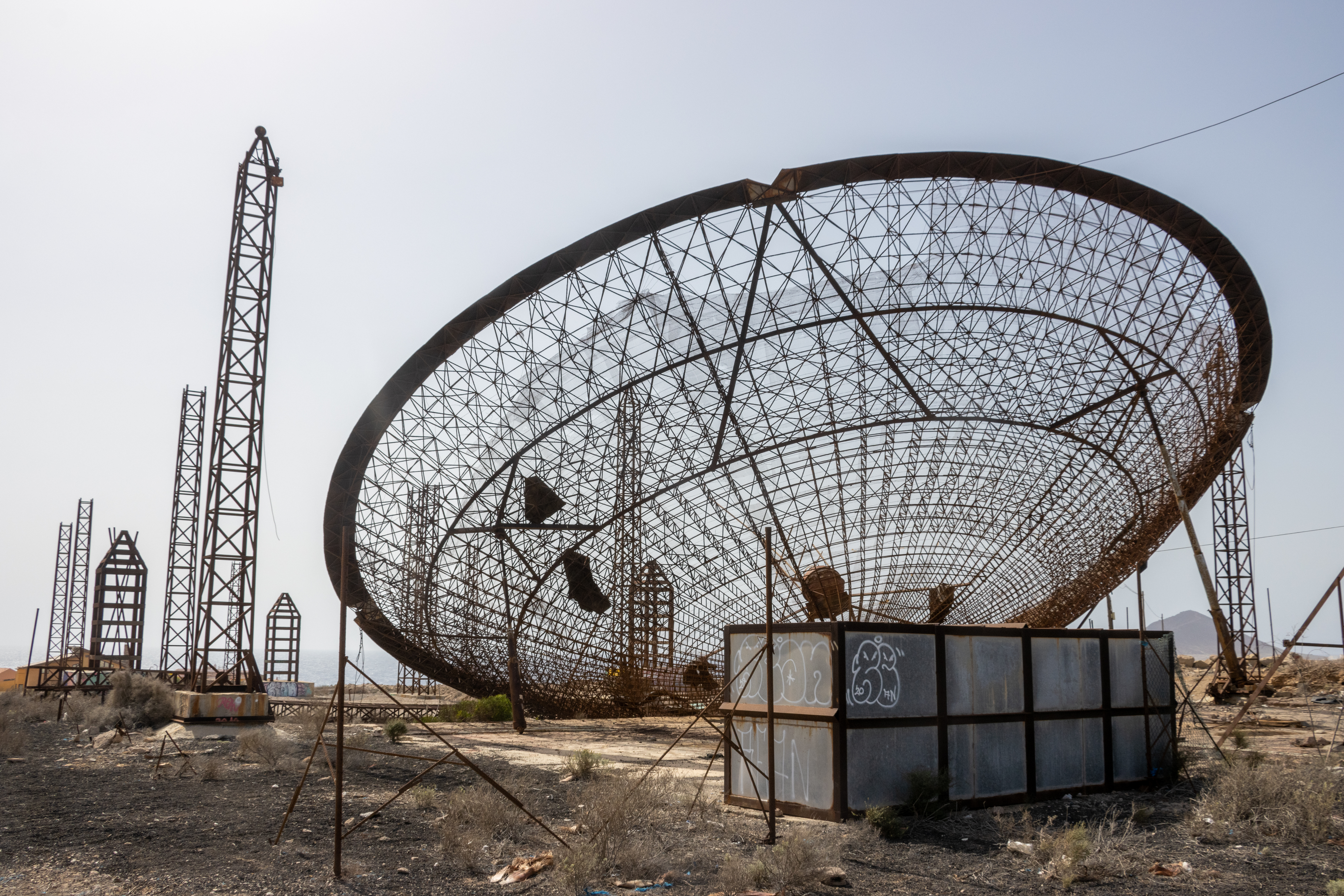
- Country: Spain
- Location: Tenerife, Canary Islands
- Coordinates: 28°03′28″N 16°31′41″W
- Status: abandoned
- Commission date: 2008
- Decommission date: 2009

Geothermal power station
- Type: solar

External links
- Commons: Related media on Commons

Laboratorio de Energía Solar Termoeléctrica is an abandoned dish structure near to El Medano, Tenerife, in the Canary Islands. It was built in 2008 to generate solar energy, but was constructed without permission and was abandoned in 2009.

== Construction ==
The structure was conceived by Daniel González, and advertised around 2006. After a grant from the Ministerio de Industria in 2007, it was constructed in 2008 by González's company, Lysply, to use solar power to generate electricity and hydrogen. It had a budget of €5 million for the first stage, and the second stage would have cost €111 million. Its official name was Promotional Laboratory for Solar Thermoelectric Energy and Energy Storage (Spanish: Laboratorio Promocional de Energía Termoeléctrica Solar y Almacenamiento de Energía).

The 26 metres (85 ft) diameter dish structure was able to track the sun, and was covered with mirrors to focus sunlight onto a small area where the solar energy was chemically stored in methanol. It was intended to be one of three matching structures for test purposes and to raise investor interest. It was also claimed that it could produce silica crystals.

== Abandonment and decay ==
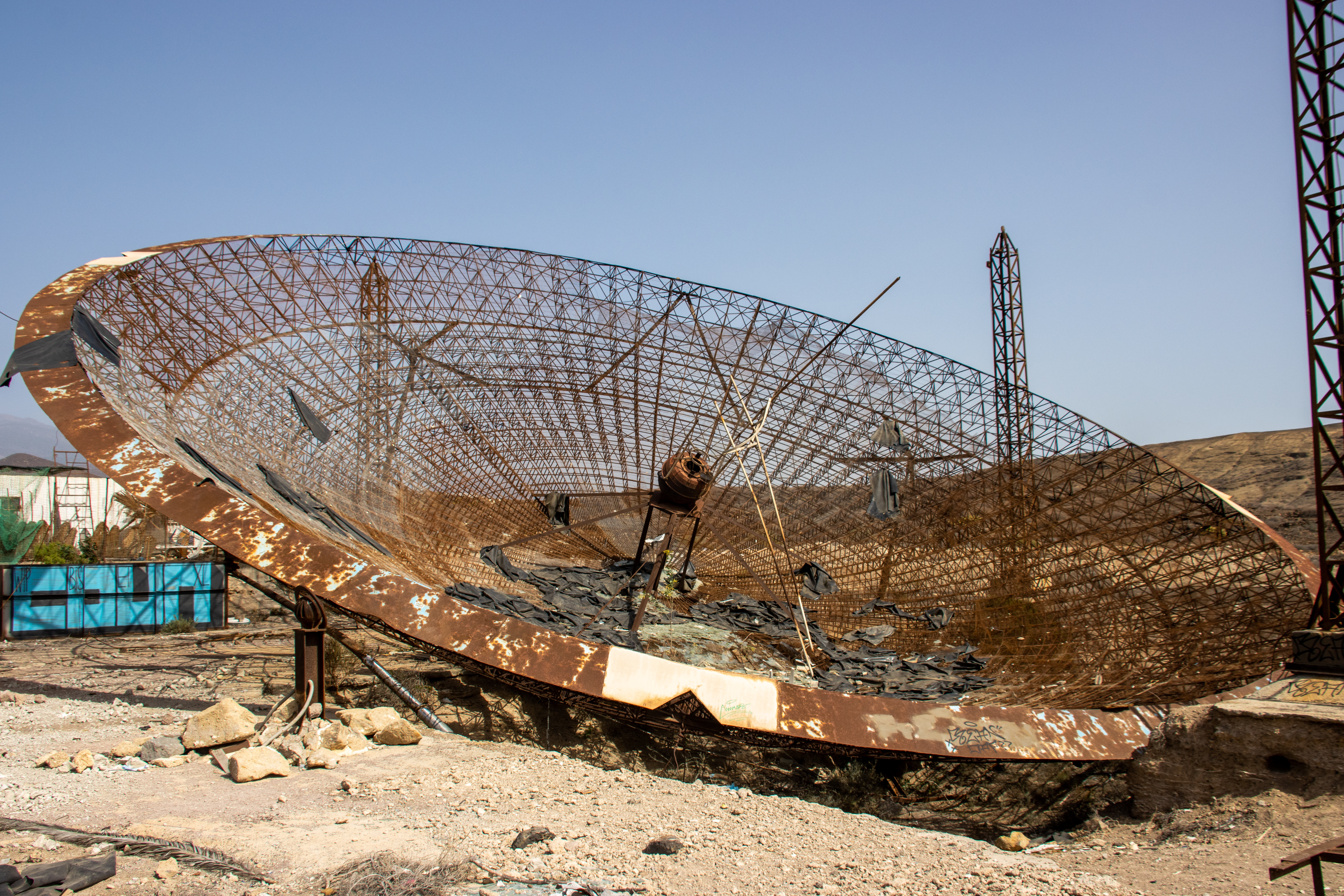
The dish from the side in 2020

The structure was built in rural land without an urban planning license, close to housing in El Médano, and in a protected landscape. Additionally, there were complaints about methanol being stored at the site. After the site was closed three times, work stopped in 2009, and the structure was abandoned. A subsequent court case by the company against the state and government of the Canary Islands, seeking €50 million per day since the site's closure on 9 February 2009 due to a claimed loss of €40 million, was rejected in 2013.

The structure is known locally as 'Parabólica'. The structure is abandoned, with no plans to remove it, and the site is now popular with photographers of abandoned spaces.

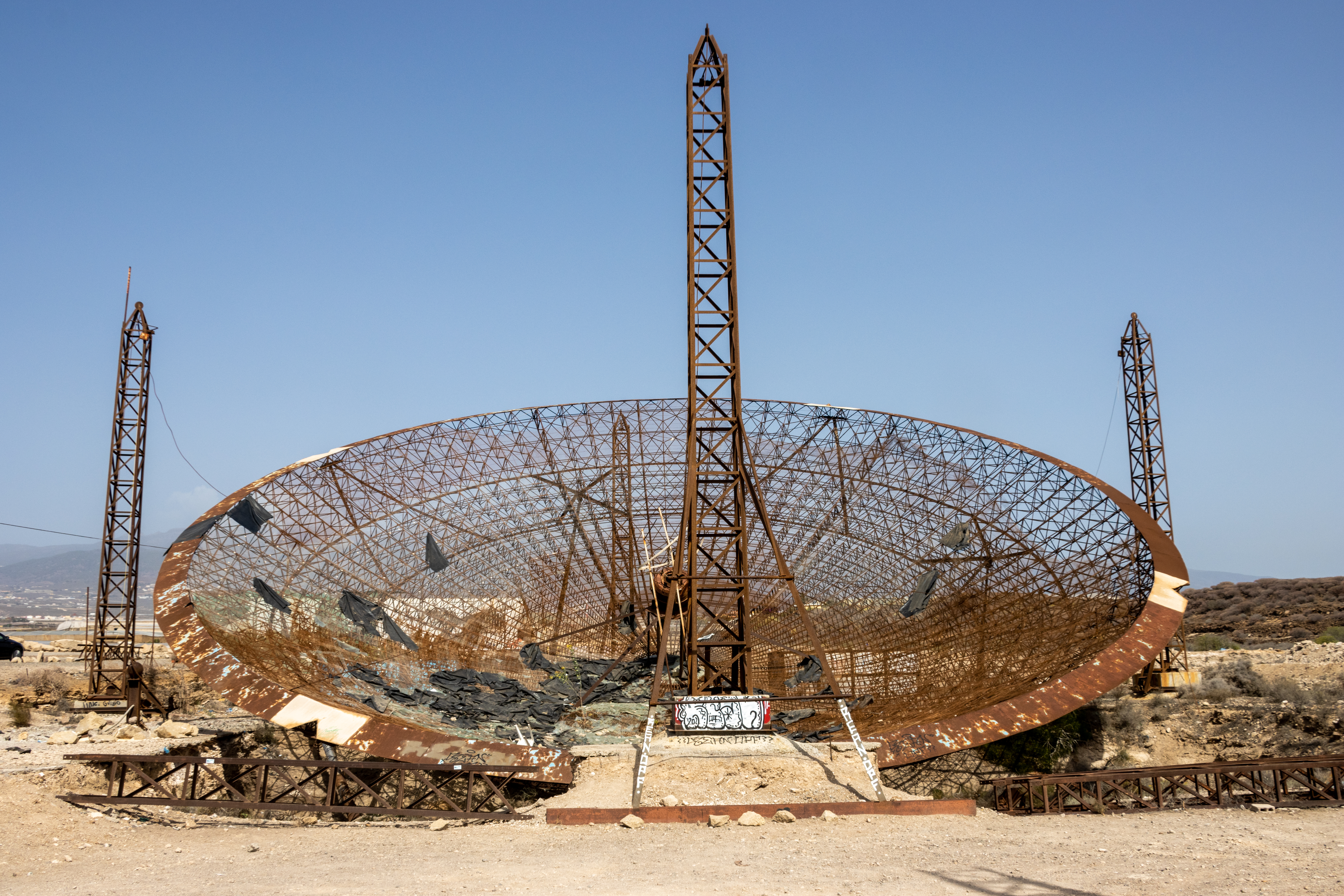
The dish and its supporting poles
