= Cathedral of La Laguna =

Cathedral of San Cristóbal de La Laguna
- Catedral de San Cristóbal de La Laguna
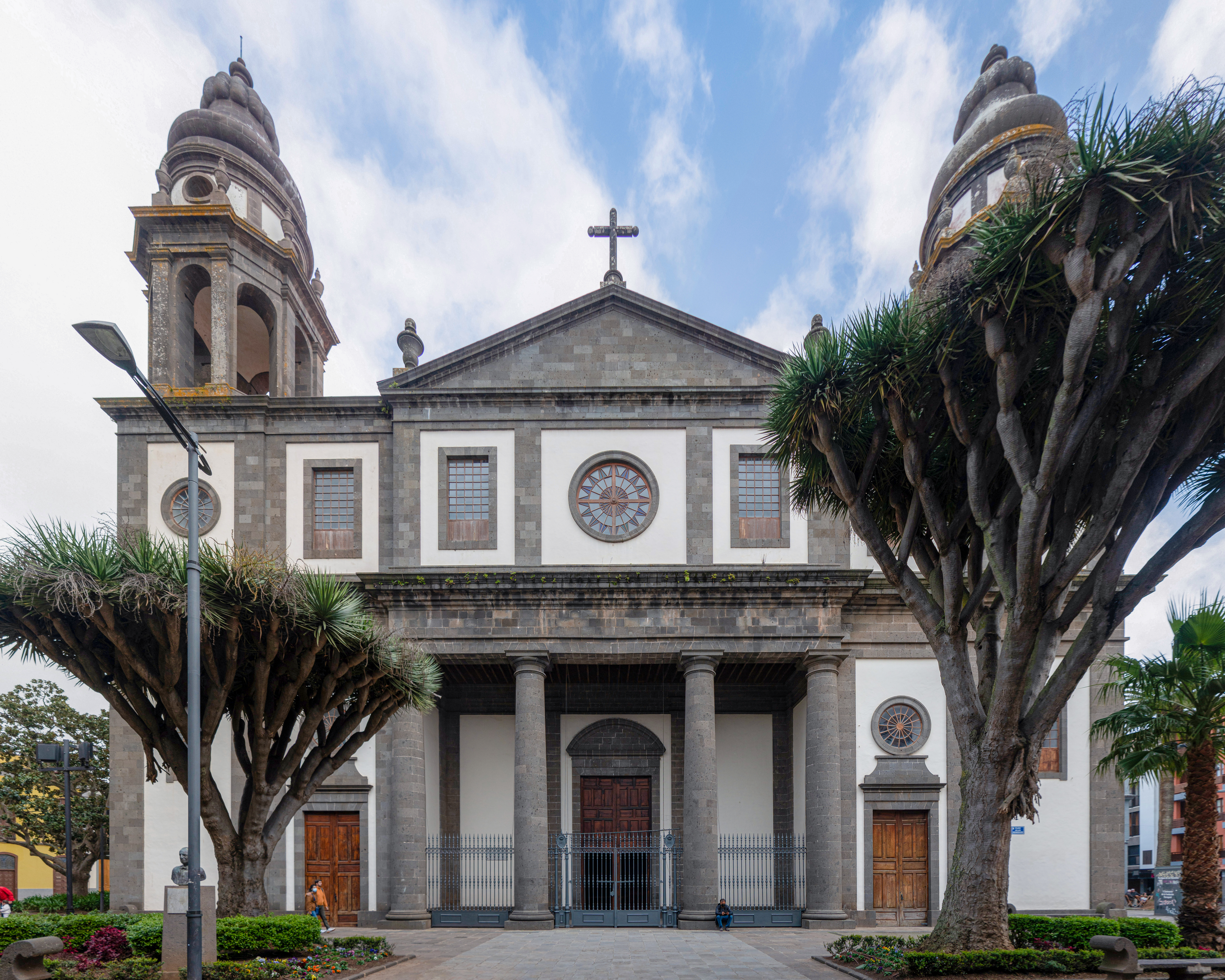
- West façade.

- Location within Canary Islands
- 28°29′20″N 16°18′59″W
- Location: San Cristóbal de La Laguna, Tenerife
- Country: Spain
- Denomination: Catholic Church
- Sui iuris church: Latin Church
- Website: Official Website

History
- Status: Cathedral

Architecture
- Architectural type: Church
- Style: Neoclassical, Neo-Gothic
- Groundbreaking: 1904
- Completed: 1915

The Cathedral of San Cristóbal de La Laguna or Catedral de Nuestra Señora de los Remedios (Santa Iglesia Catedral de San Cristóbal de La Laguna in Spanish) is a Catholic church in Tenerife, Spain. Constructed between 1904 and 1915 to replace an earlier building begun in 1515 and designated a cathedral in 1818, it is dedicated to the Virgin of Los Remedios (patron of the Diocese of San Cristóbal de La Laguna and the island of Tenerife). The cathedral is the mother church of the diocese, which includes the islands of Tenerife, La Palma, La Gomera and El Hierro in the province of Santa Cruz de Tenerife. It is therefore where the episcopal seat of the bishop of this diocese, currently occupied by Bishop Eloy Alberto Santiago. This is one of the most important churches of the Canary Islands.

The Cathedral of San Cristóbal de La Laguna is located in the city of San Cristóbal de La Laguna (Tenerife, Canary Islands, Spain). In the cathedral lie the remains of Alonso Fernandez de Lugo, conqueror of the island and founder of the city. The cathedral is located in the historic center of the city of La Laguna, and was declared a World Heritage Site in 1999 by UNESCO. The cathedral contains elements of several architectural styles including Neoclassical and Neo-Gothic. The Cathedral of La Laguna is best known for its Neoclassical facade, inspired by the Cathedral of Pamplona, and its dome, which prominently dominates the cityscape.

== History ==
=== Primitive temples ===
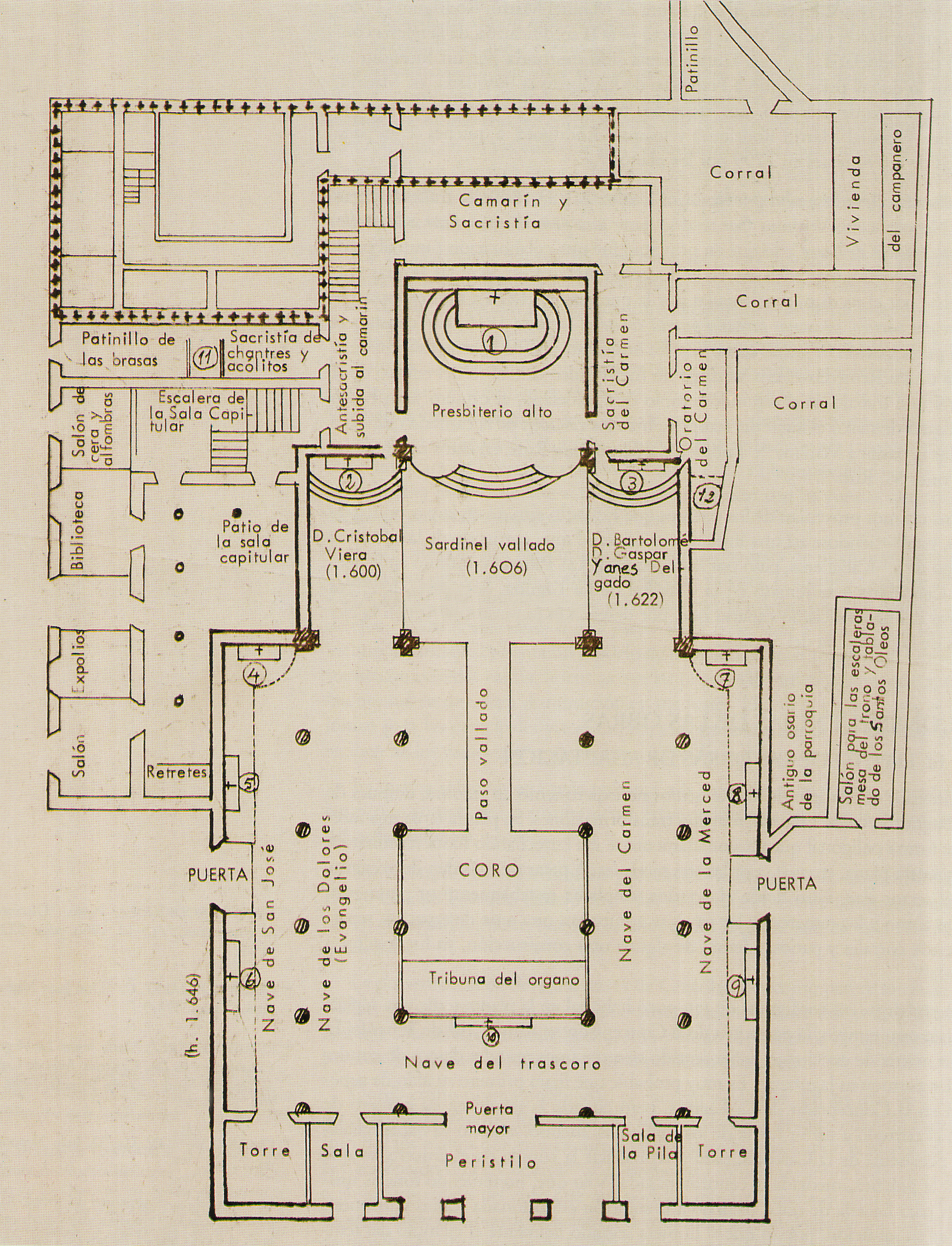
Plan of the church of the period 1809-1905

In 1511, a hermitage was erected on the site of the current Plaza de Fray Albino edifice. It was built by order of the conquistador, Alonso Fernández de Lugo. The area appears to have been an ancient Guanche necropolis. It is also known that the whole valley of Aguere (in which the city lies), especially the large lake that was in this place, was a place of pilgrimage for the indigenous people of the island.

This primitive chapel was originally dedicated to the Virgin Mary in her Expectation, which is celebrated every 18 December.

The chapel was replaced in 1515 with a major construction dedicated to the Virgin of Los Remedios in the Mudéjar architectural style, to which a tower was added in 1618. It was on 21 April 1515 when the site rose to the level of parish with the name Santa Maria de los Remedios. The feast day of the Nativity of the Virgin Mary is celebrated on 8 September.

That same year, the Portuguese mason Miguel Alonso built the main chapel, the main arch, the altar, the stands, the tabernacle and the door of the sacristy, all made of stone.

On 7 April 1534, Saint José de Anchieta was baptized in the church. He was born in the city of La Laguna, became a missionary, and later became the founder of the city of São Paulo and one of the founders of Rio de Janeiro, both in Brazil. Precisely the cathedral is the diocesan shrine of the saint in the Canary Islands.

In 1752 a new transept was built, the main chapel vestries were widened and spacious dressing rooms were added for the image of the patron saint, the Virgen de los Remedios. Don Domingo de la Guerra, who directed the work and was later Marqués de San Andrés, extended the main chapel, because he hoped that one day the temple would become the Cathedral of Tenerife.

=== Cathedral ===
Several times since the old chapel was converted into a parish in 1515, there were attempts to have it be designated a cathedral, collegiate, or auxiliary cathedral dependent on the Cathedral of Santa Ana of Las Palmas de Gran Canaria, with some of the members of the Canary Cathedral Chapter residing in the Church of Los Remedios. These initial applications were not successful.

In 1783, at the height of the Enlightenment (La Laguna was the center of this movement in the Canary Islands), a request was made for designation as a diocese to be located in the Church of Los Remedios but the request was received with suspicion by members of the Cathedral Chapter and the Bishop of Gran Canaria, and the establishment of an ecclesiastical institution on this island was again rejected.

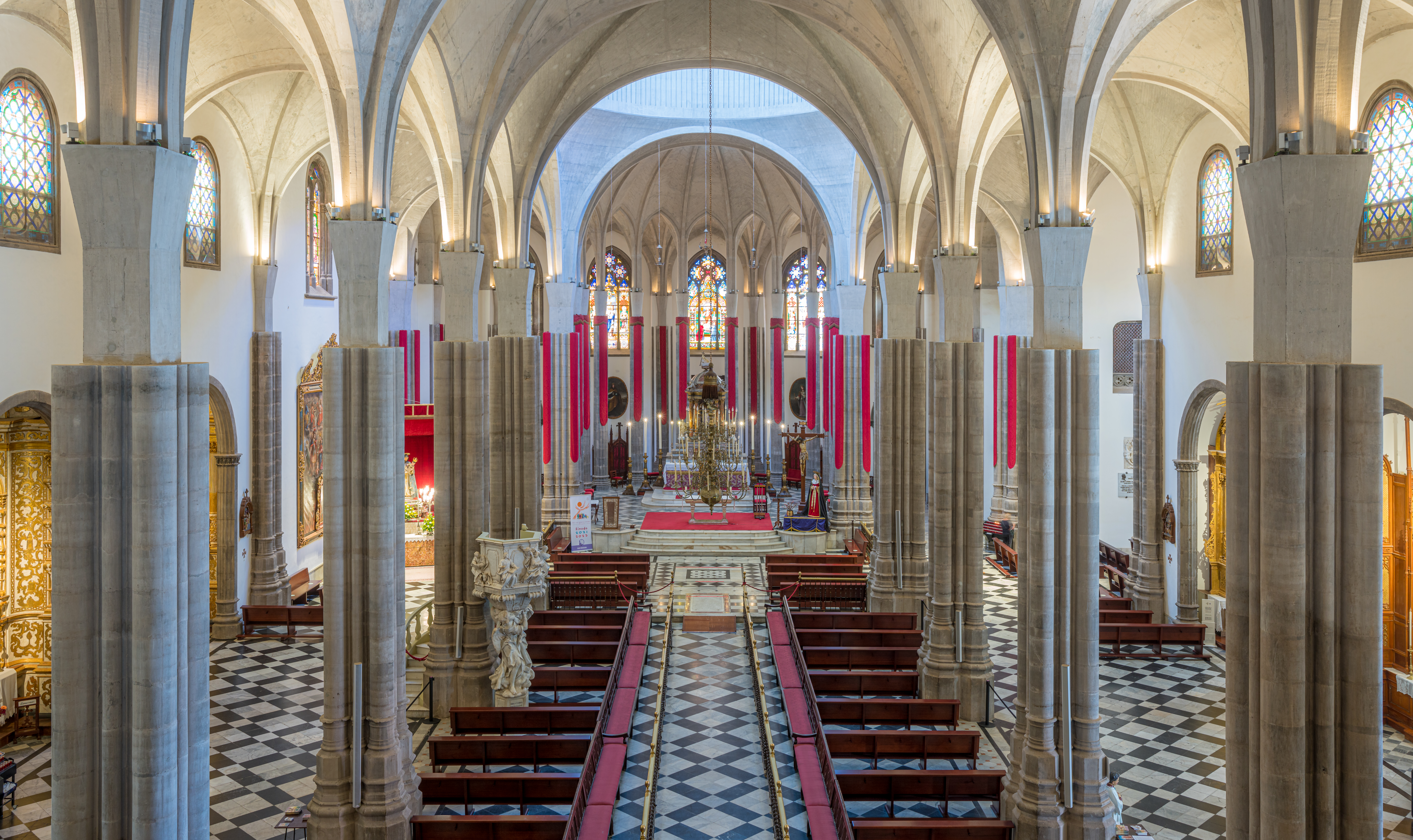
Interior of the cathedral

Finally, on 1 February 1819, a papal bull approved the division of the Diocese of Canarias in two dioceses. The temple became a cathedral in 1819 by bull of Pope Pius VII, and the new diocese of La Laguna was created. The Diocese of San Cristóbal de La Laguna includes the islands of Tenerife, La Palma, La Gomera and El Hierro in the province of Santa Cruz de Tenerife.

In obtaining the title of cathedral and the creation of the Diocese it had an important role priest Cristóbal Bencomo y Rodríguez, confessor of King Ferdinand VII of Spain and Titular Archbishop of Heraclea. His tomb is now in the presbytery of the Cathedral of La Laguna, next to the Epistle.

At the time the building was constructed and dedicated as a cathedral, the capital of the island was the city of San Cristóbal de La Laguna, which is why the cathedral was built there and not in the current capital of the island (Santa Cruz de Tenerife). The diocesan headquarters still remains in San Cristóbal de La Laguna. On 5 October 1983, the Cathedral of La Laguna was declared a National Historic-Artistic Monument in Spain.

During the time of the suppression of the Bishopric of Tenerife (between 1851 and 1875) as a result of the Concordat of 1851, the Cathedral of La Laguna lost its cathedral title, becoming the collegiate church and being the only collegiate church that has existed in the Canary Islands. With the restoration of the diocese in 1875, the temple regains its status as a cathedral church with all the ecclesiastical privileges it enjoyed previously.

The cathedral is also a parish and a Marian shrine, as the Virgin of Los Remedios is the patron saint of the Roman Catholic Diocese of San Cristóbal de La Laguna and the island of Tenerife. There is some expectation that this church will be declared a minor basilica by the Holy See in the near future.

=== Restoration 2002–2014 ===
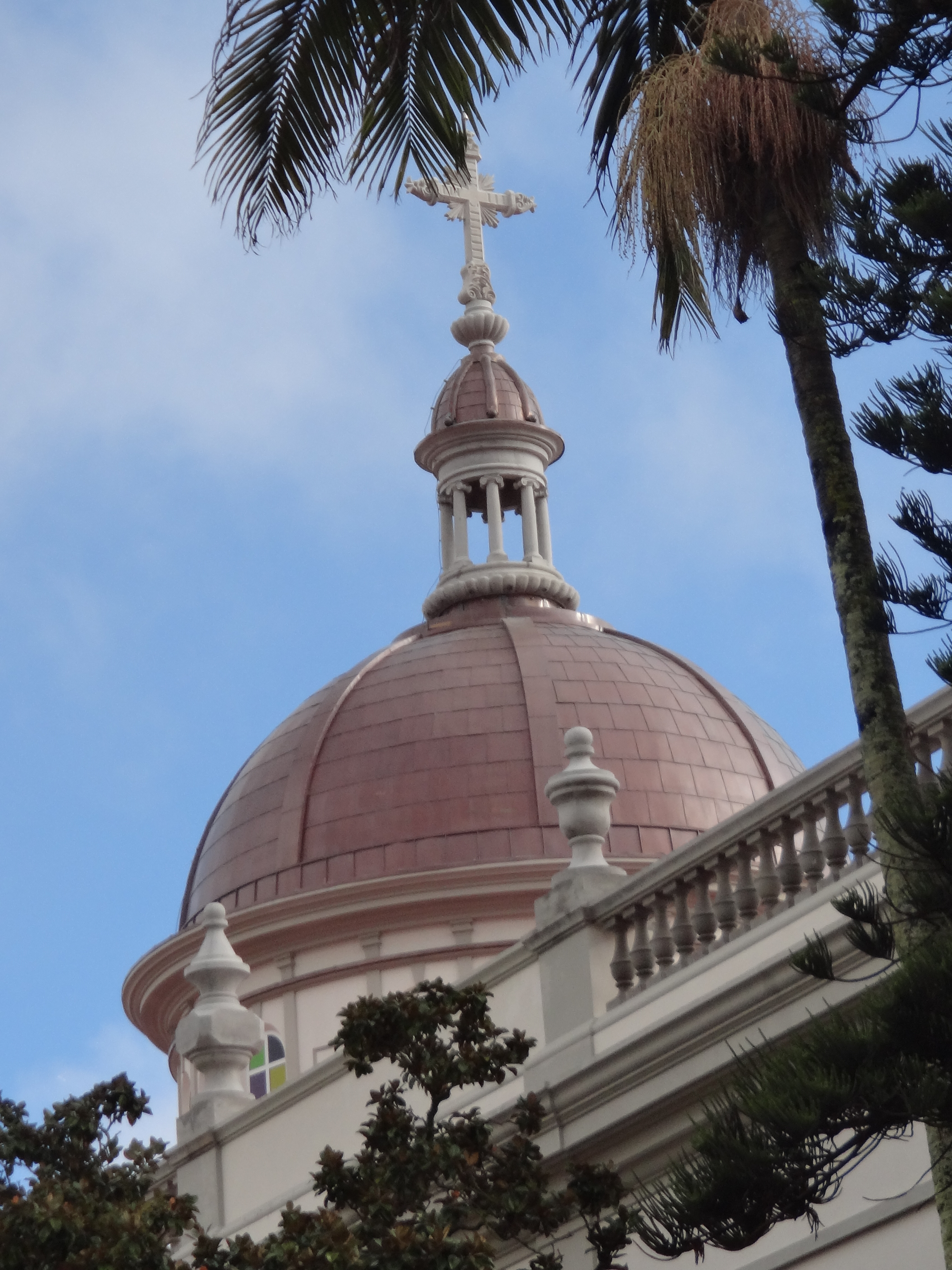
Dome of the cathedral

In 2002 the cathedral was closed to worship for a meticulous restoration, with the intention of reopening a few years later. However, due to bureaucratic disagreements, the cathedral remained closed for more than a decade. During the pre-restoration study, it had been discovered that the main dome and vaults were so damaged that the only viable solution was the demolition of these elements and their subsequent reconstruction. The new vaults and domes were built with a new material, polypropylene fiber, making the cathedral the first in the world to use this material. Finally, the doors were reopened on 25 January 2014, to be reopened to worship on 31 January of that year.

To mark the centenary and the reopening of the cathedral, a Jubilee Year was held from 27 April 2014, until 12 April 2015, both dates coinciding with the Divine Mercy Sunday. That Jubilee was decreed by a special mandate of Pope Francis, with the chance of winning the faithful a plenary indulgence.

During the remodeling, which included Cathedral Square in 2014, archaeological remains were discovered underground. Some evidence was unearthed in the rubble that suggested it belonged to the ancient Church of Los Remedios or to structures from the first European settlement in the city. Later, in 2018 human remains of the sixteenth century were discovered in the place. One thinks that in the place the old parochial cemetery was located.

== Architecture ==
The Neoclassical front dates back to 1820. The current building was constructed between 1904 and 1915 and is in the Neo-Gothic style. The cathedral has three wide aisles and an ambulatory (unique in the Canary Islands) that surrounds the chancel, or altar. These elements give the interior of the cathedral a typical medieval European feel in contrast to the colonial style of the exterior.

The cathedral's large dome is topped by a large concrete cross. It is 41.5 m (136 ft) in height, which makes it the highest point in the old town. The vaults are topped by small windows that let in natural light. The dome is covered with copper plates, imitating the cathedrals of central and northern Europe.

== Chapels ==
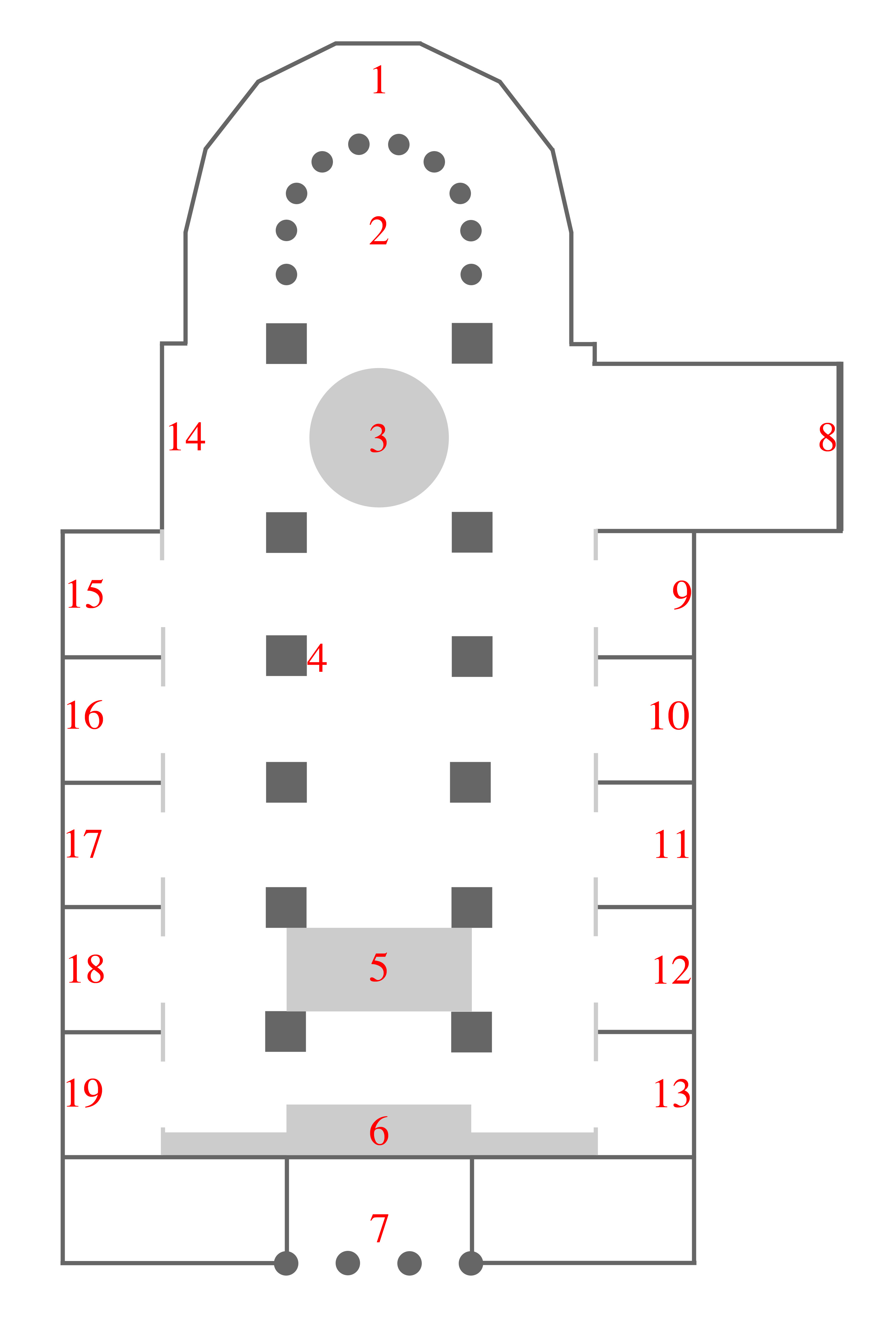
Plan of the Cathedral of La Laguna 1- Ambulatory 2- High altar 3- Dome 4- Pulpit 5- Stalls of Cathedral Chapter 6- Organ loft 7- Portal 8- Chapel of Our Lady of Remedies 9- Chapel of the Immaculate Conception 10- Chapel of Saint Teresa of Avila 11- Side entrance on the street Obispo Rey Redondo (Calle de La Carrera) 12- Chapel of Our Lady of Mount Carmel 13- Chapel of Saint Barbara 14- Table of Souls in Purgatory 15- Chapel of Christ tied to the Column 16- Chapel of Our Lady of Candelaria 17- Side entrance down the street Bencomo 18- Chapel of Saint Joseph of Nazareth 19- Chapel of the Baptistery

=== Chapel of Saint Teresa of Avila ===
The altarpiece of Saint Teresa of Avila is Neo-Gothic. In the center is the statue of St. Teresa of Avila. The chapel also is the altarpiece of Ecce Homo (locally called Señor de la Cañita) that was installed in March 2014, shortly after the reopening of the cathedral following its recent restoration.

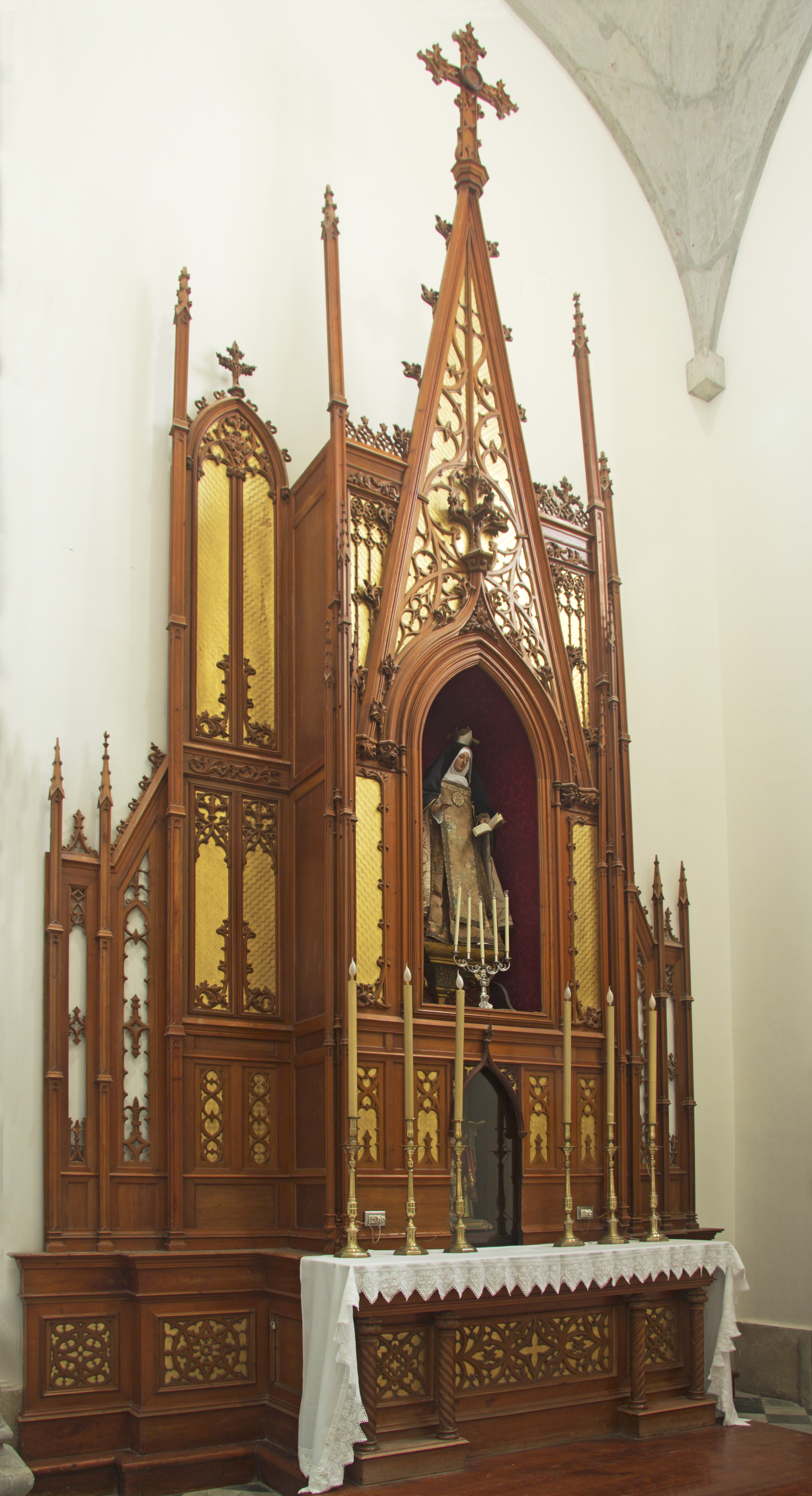
Altarpiece of Saint Teresa of Avila

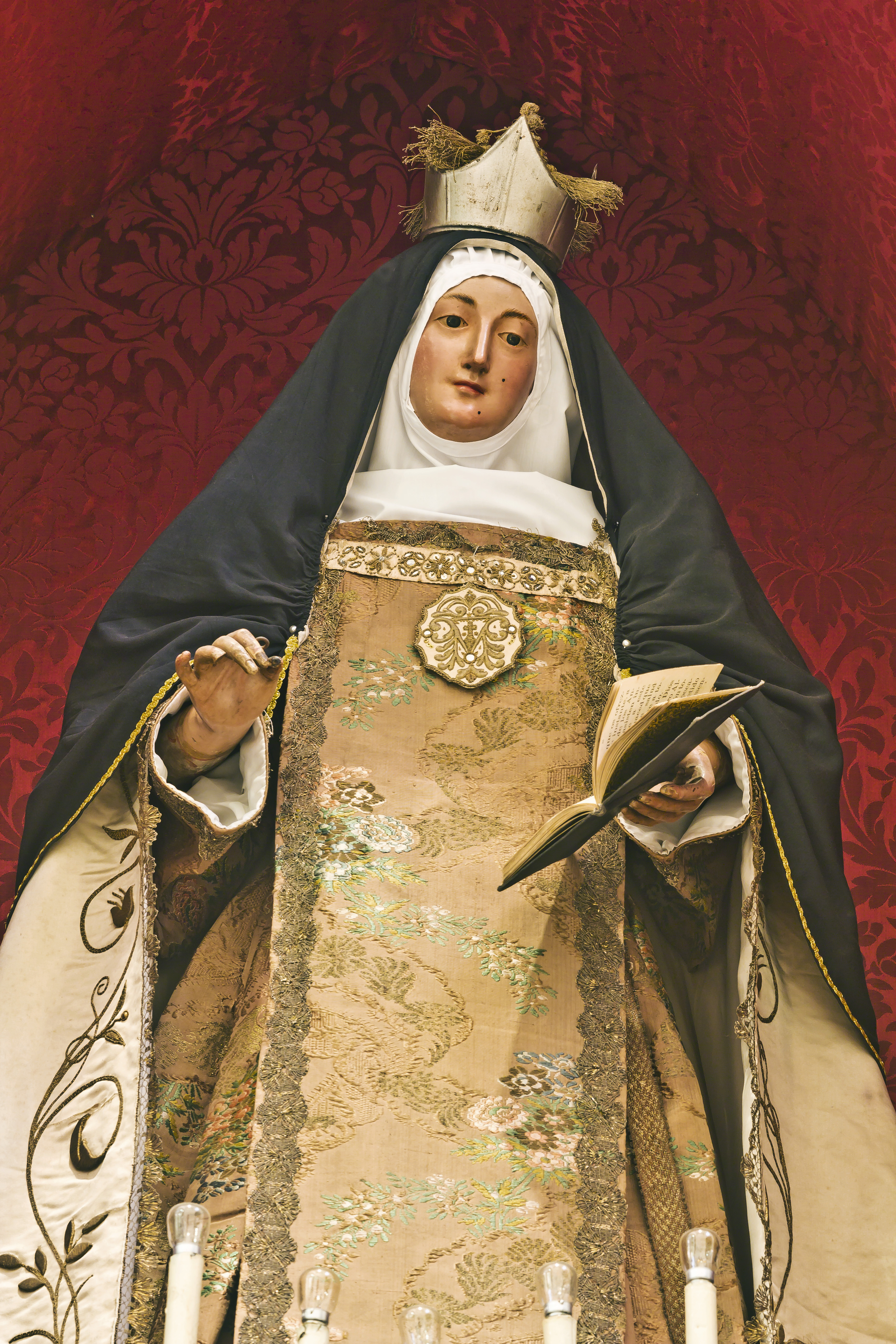
Saint Teresa of Avila

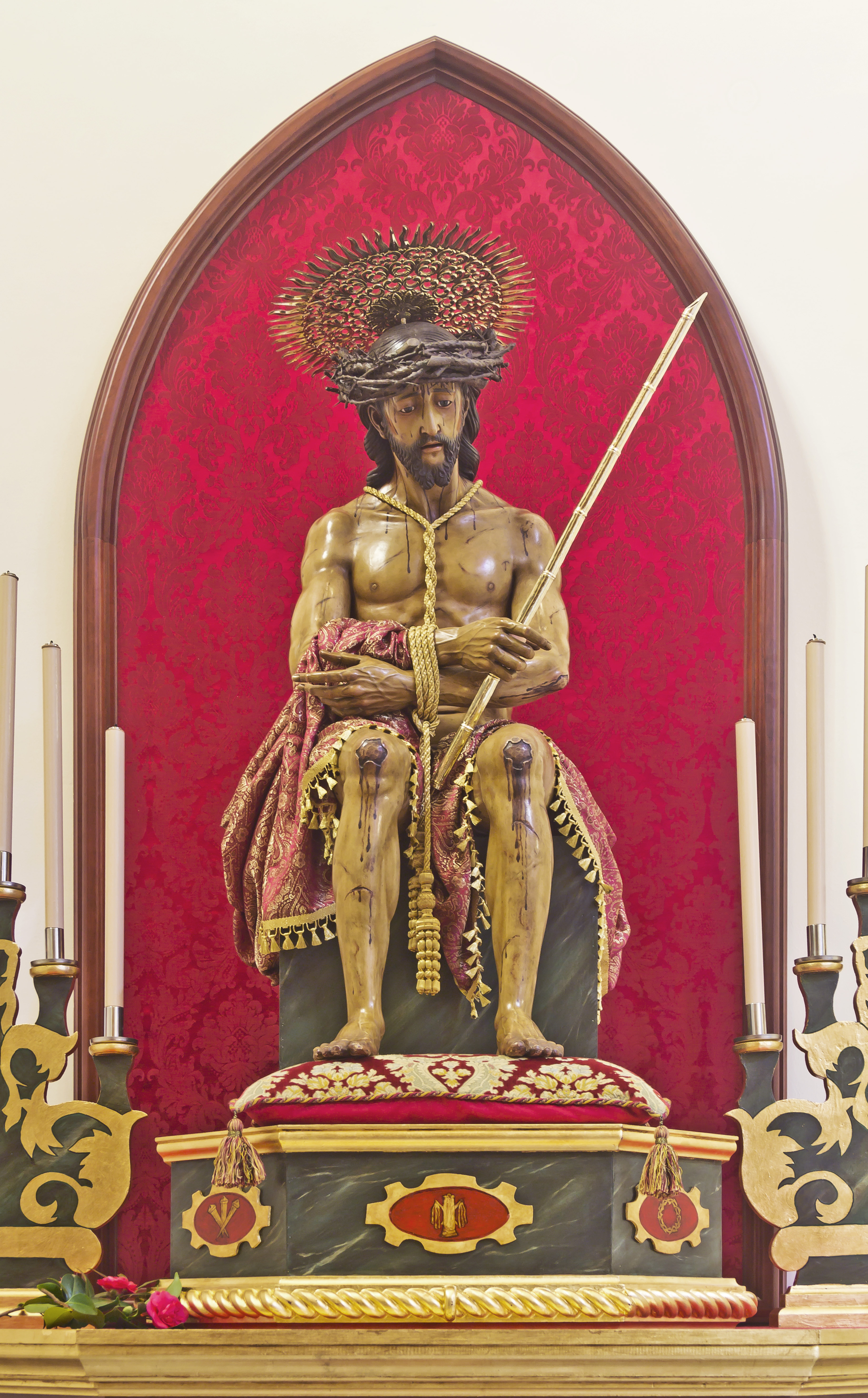
Señor de la Cañita

=== Chapel of the Immaculate Conception ===
This chapel, dedicated to the Immaculate Conception, is located on the right side (side of the Epistle) directly next to the Chapel of Our Lady of Remedies. The altarpiece of the Immaculate was created in 1915 and suffered extensive damage during the time the cathedral was closed for restoration from 2002 to 2014. Today, the altarpiece of the Immaculate is already restored. The sculpture Our Lady of Light (Nuestra Señora de la Luz) is in this chapel, dating from the mid-sixteenth century. This image has been attributed to the sculptor working environment Roque Balduque, for its resemblance to the works of the Sevillian sculptor of Flemish origin, among which is the image of Our Lady of Evangelization venerated in the Cathedral of Lima (Peru). The tomb of bishop Nicolás Rey y Redondo is in the back of the chapel.

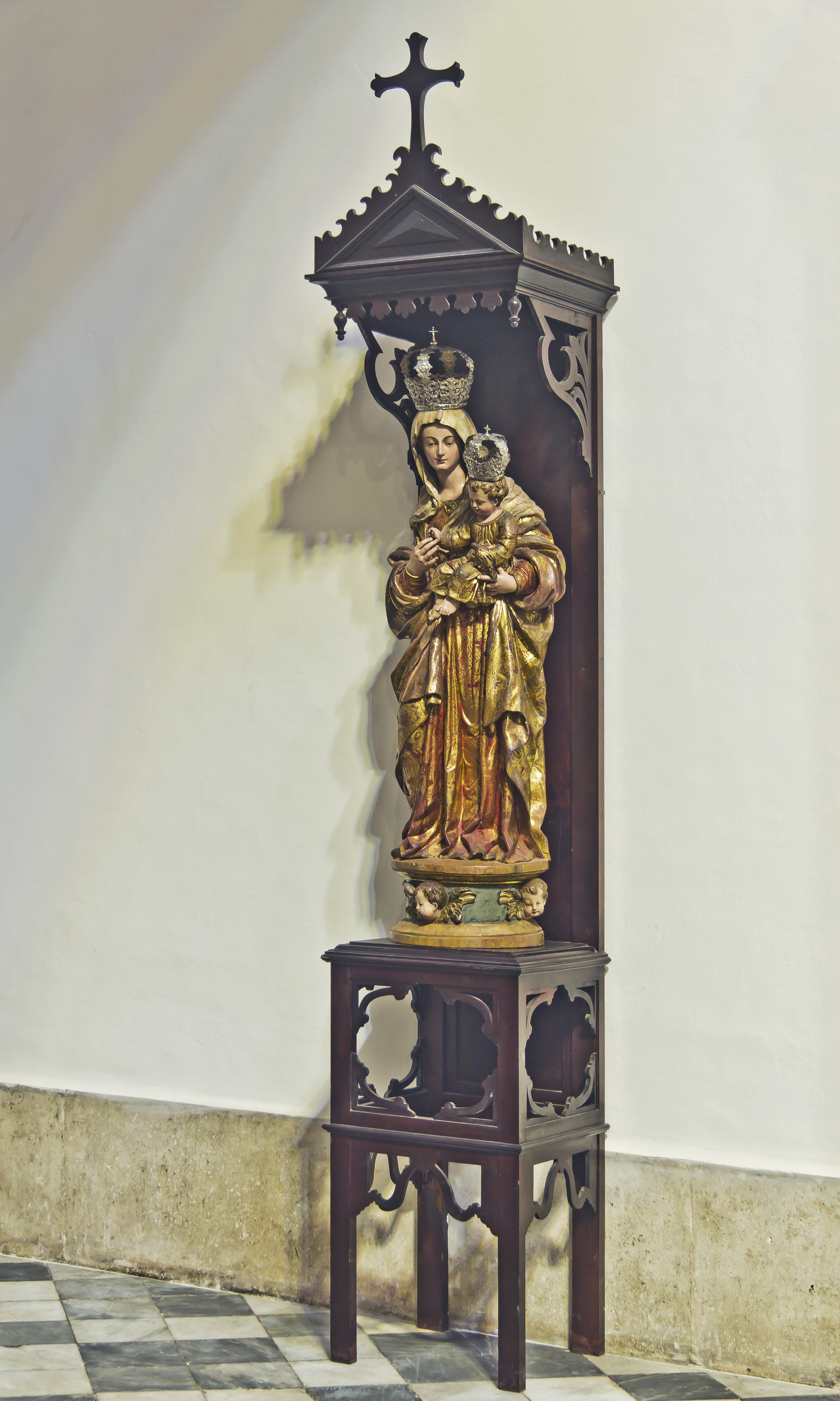
Nuestra Señora de la Luz

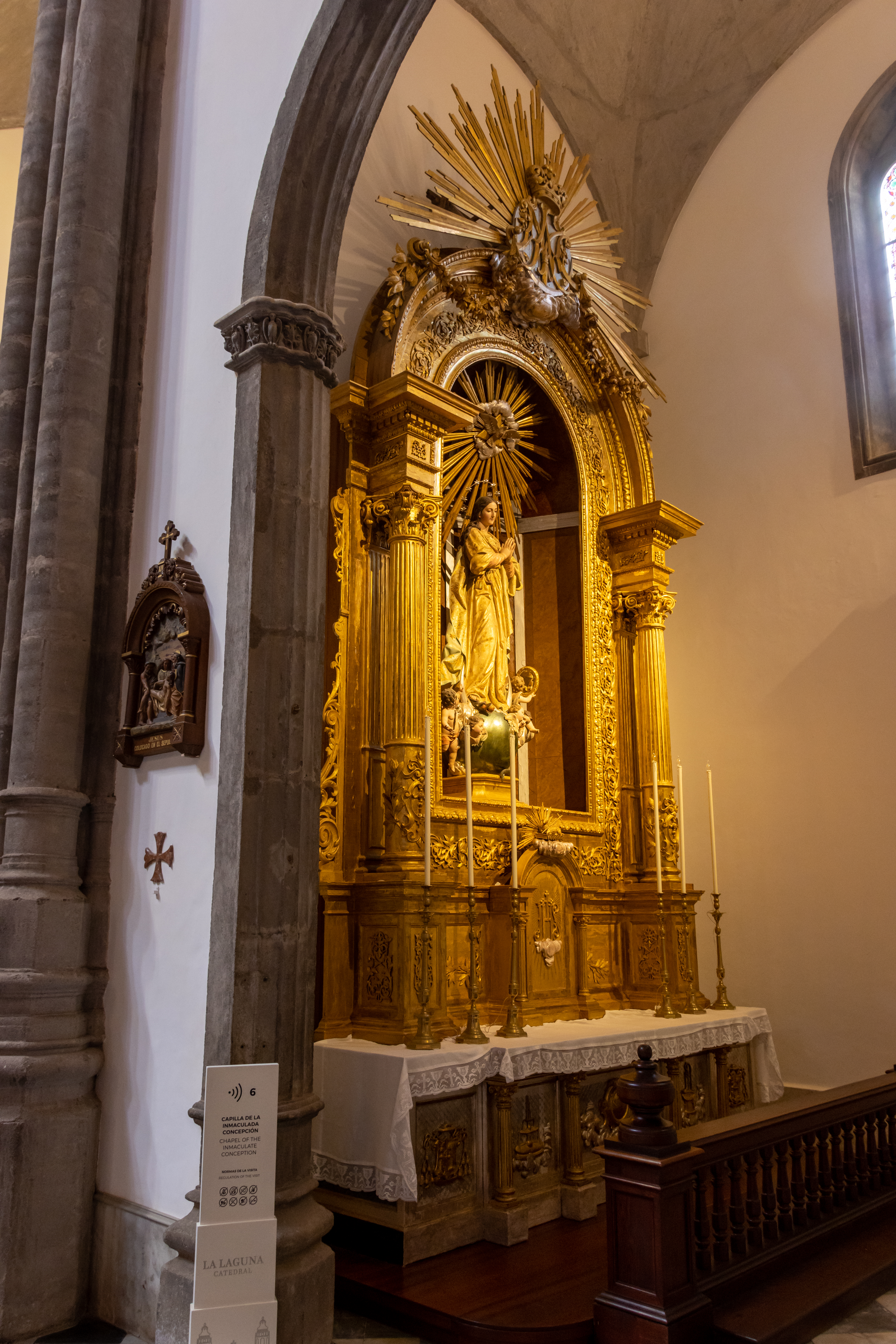
Altarpiece of the Immaculate Conception

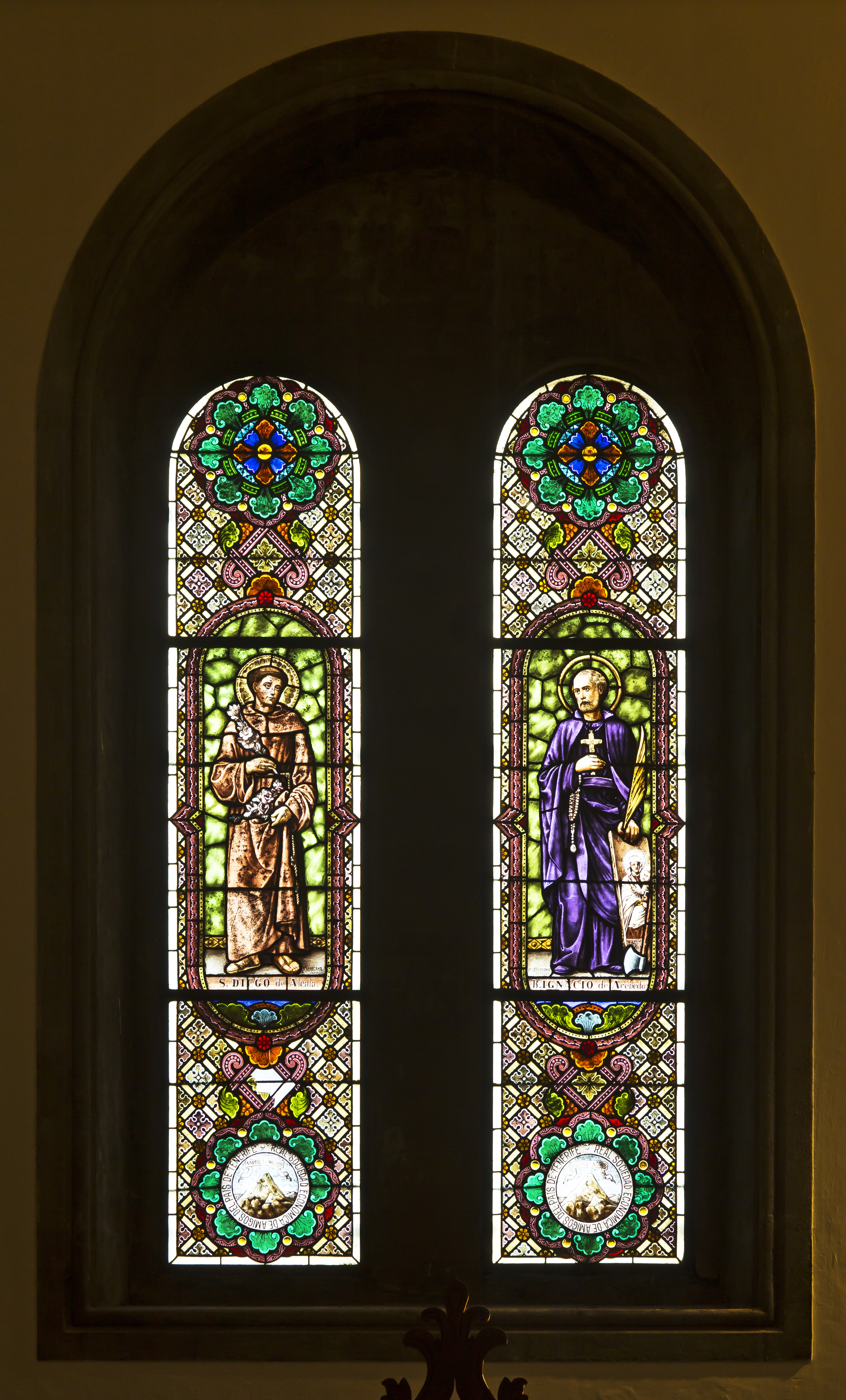
Stained glass windows depicting Saint Diego de Alcalá and Blessed Ignacio de Azevedo

=== Chapel of Christ tied to the Column ===
The sculpture of Christ at the column that presides over this chapel was blessed on 6 June 1756, and was created by sculptor Pietro Galleano in Genoa (Italy). The altarpiece was carved between 1763 and 1765, and is covered in gold. Next to Christ is the statue of Our Lady of Sorrows carved in Seville and attributed to the sculptor Gabriel Astorga y Miranda, and the other side is Saint Mary Magdalene, sculpture by Fernando Estévez. On a base next to the altarpiece is the image of the Sacred Heart of Jesus. In this chapel is the tomb of bishop Luis Franco Cascón.

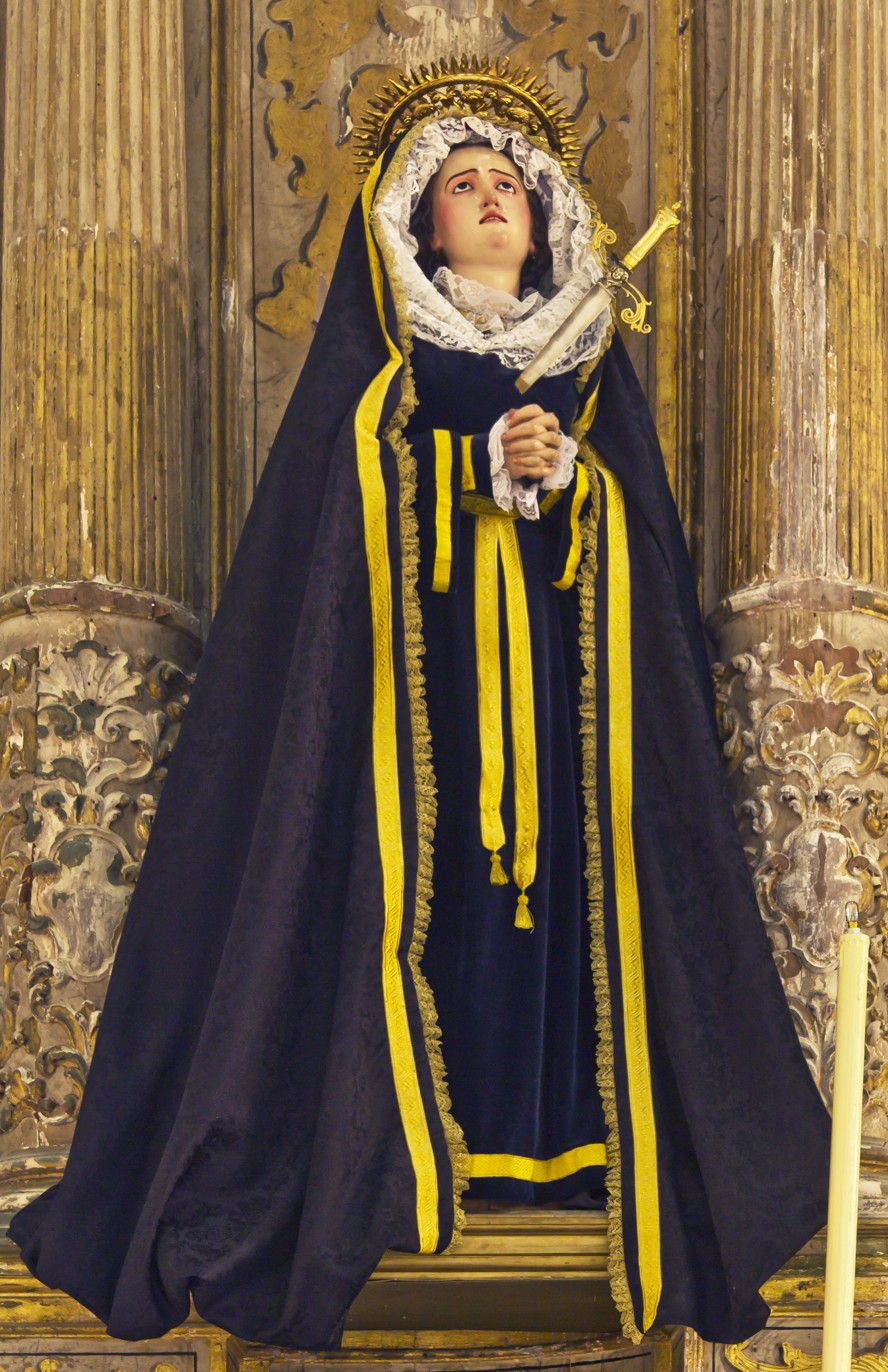
Our Lady of Sorrows

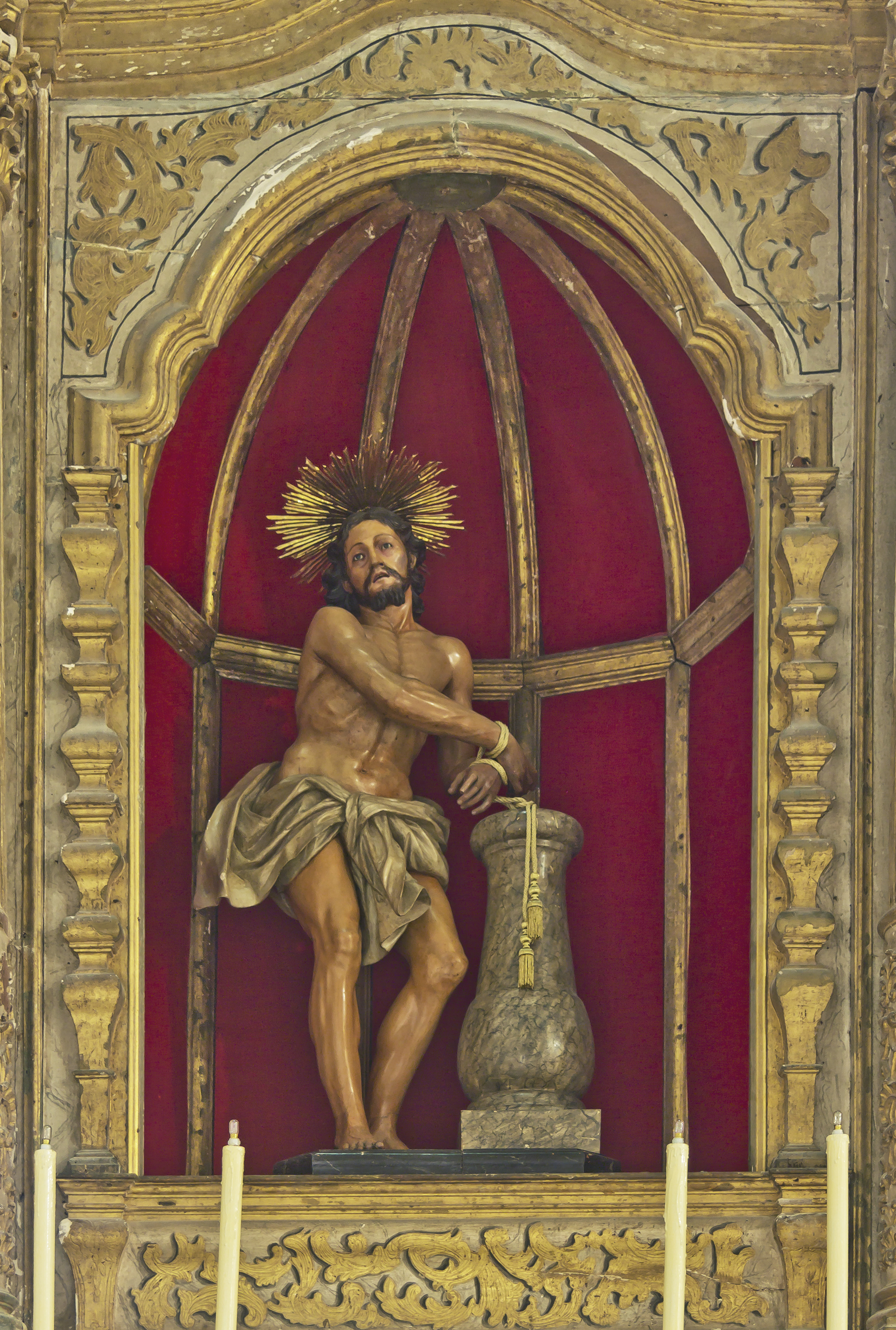
Christ at the column

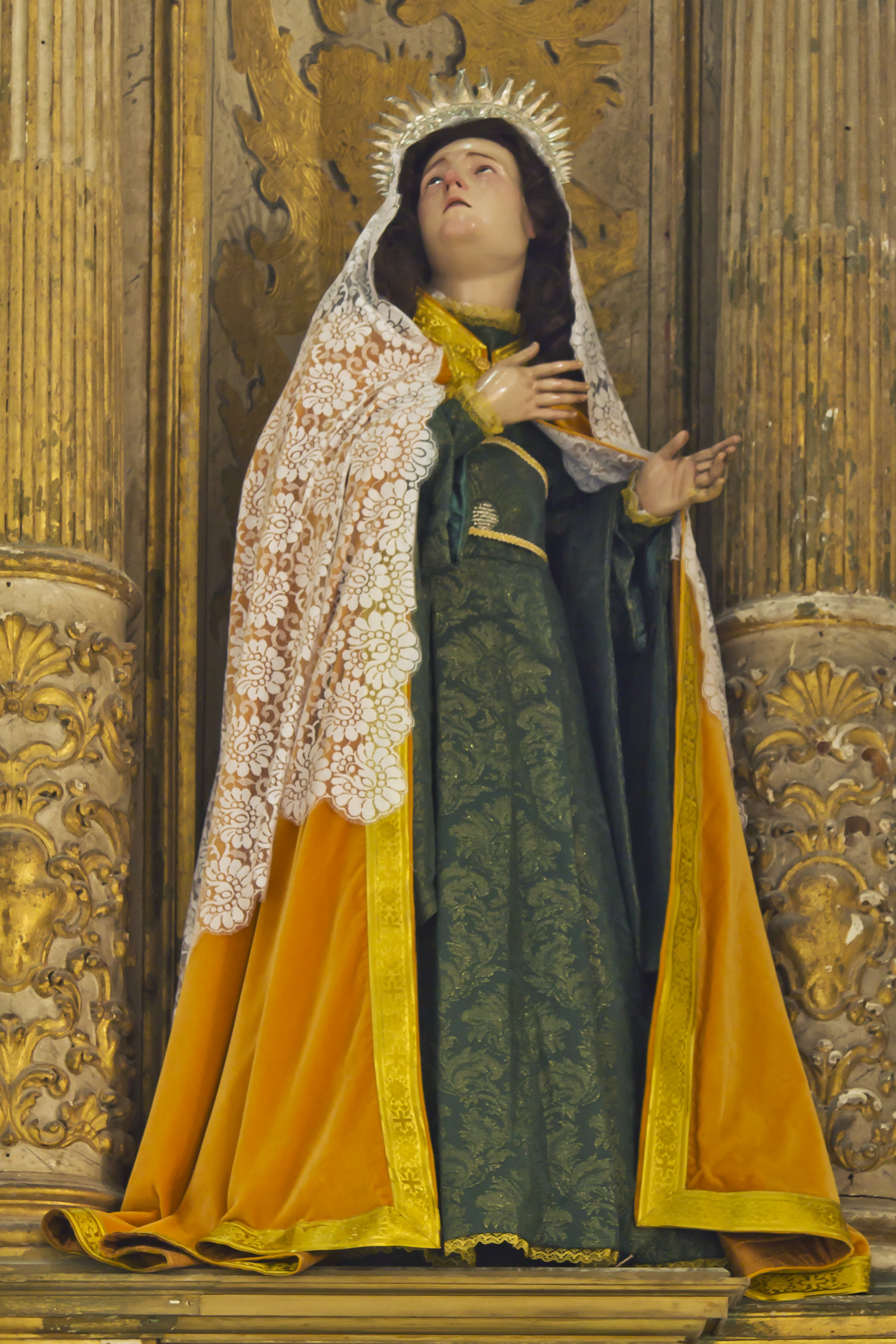
Saint Mary Magdalene

=== Chapel of Our Lady of Candelaria ===
It is also called the Chapel of the Canary Saints and is located in the center of the cathedral, next to the side door that faces Bencomo Street. The altarpiece of the Virgin of Candelaria was initially dedicated to the Virgin of Mercy. The sculpture of the Virgin of Candelaria is a replica of the patron saint of the Canary Islands venerated in the Shrine Basilica of the town of Candelaria. This image was made by local sculptor Faustino Álvarez Hernández and restored by sculptor Ezequiel de León Domínguez. Next to the Virgin are the images sculptures of the Canarian saints Saint José de Anchieta and Saint Peter of Saint Joseph de Betancur. In the chapel there is also a sculpture of Christ Nazarene which came from Valencia and reached the city of La Laguna in 1901 and the Our Lady of Solitude, from the 18th century, the work of the local sculptor José Rodríguez de la Oliva. The tomb of Bishop Bernardo Álvarez Afonso is located in this chapel.

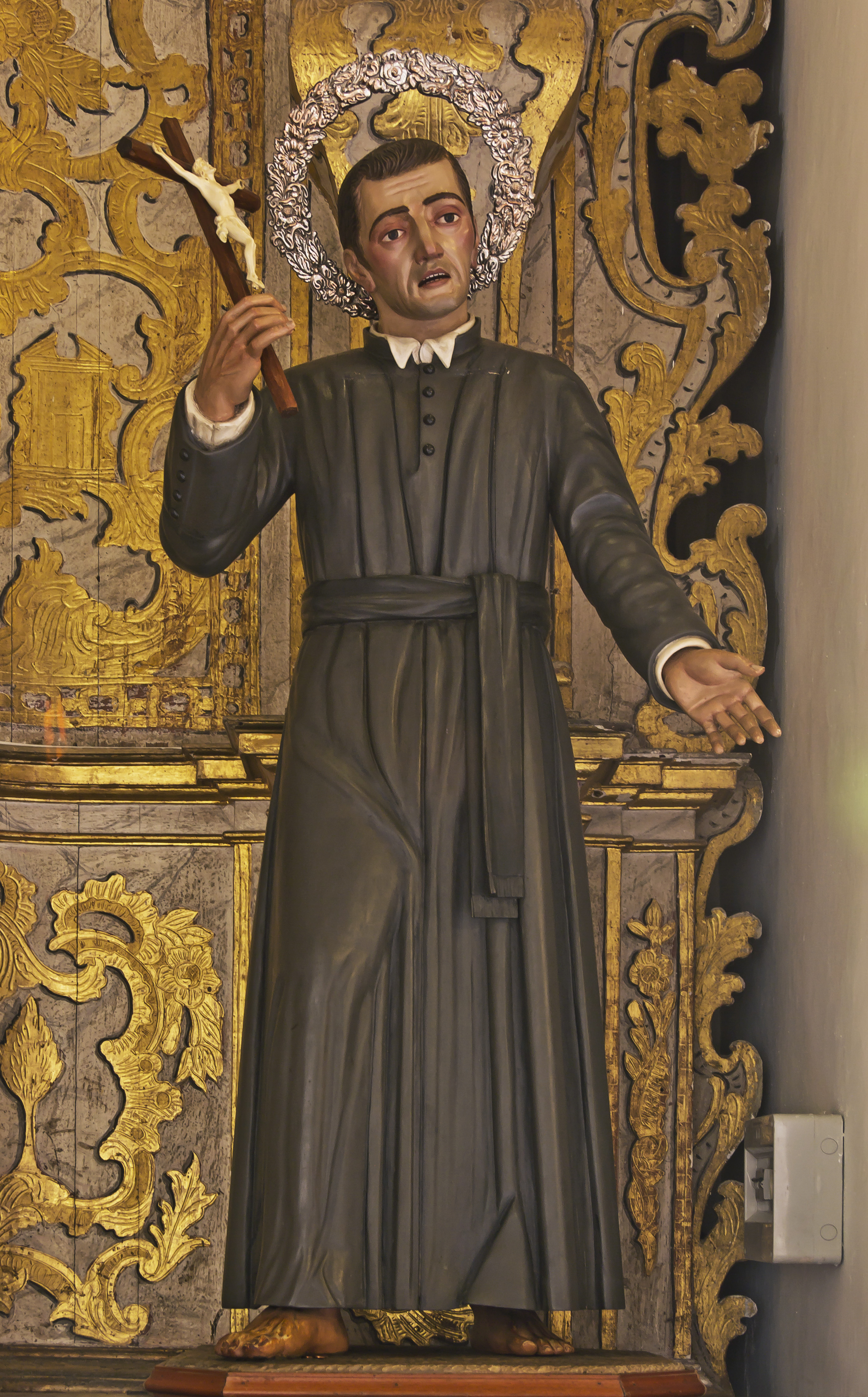
Saint José de Anchieta

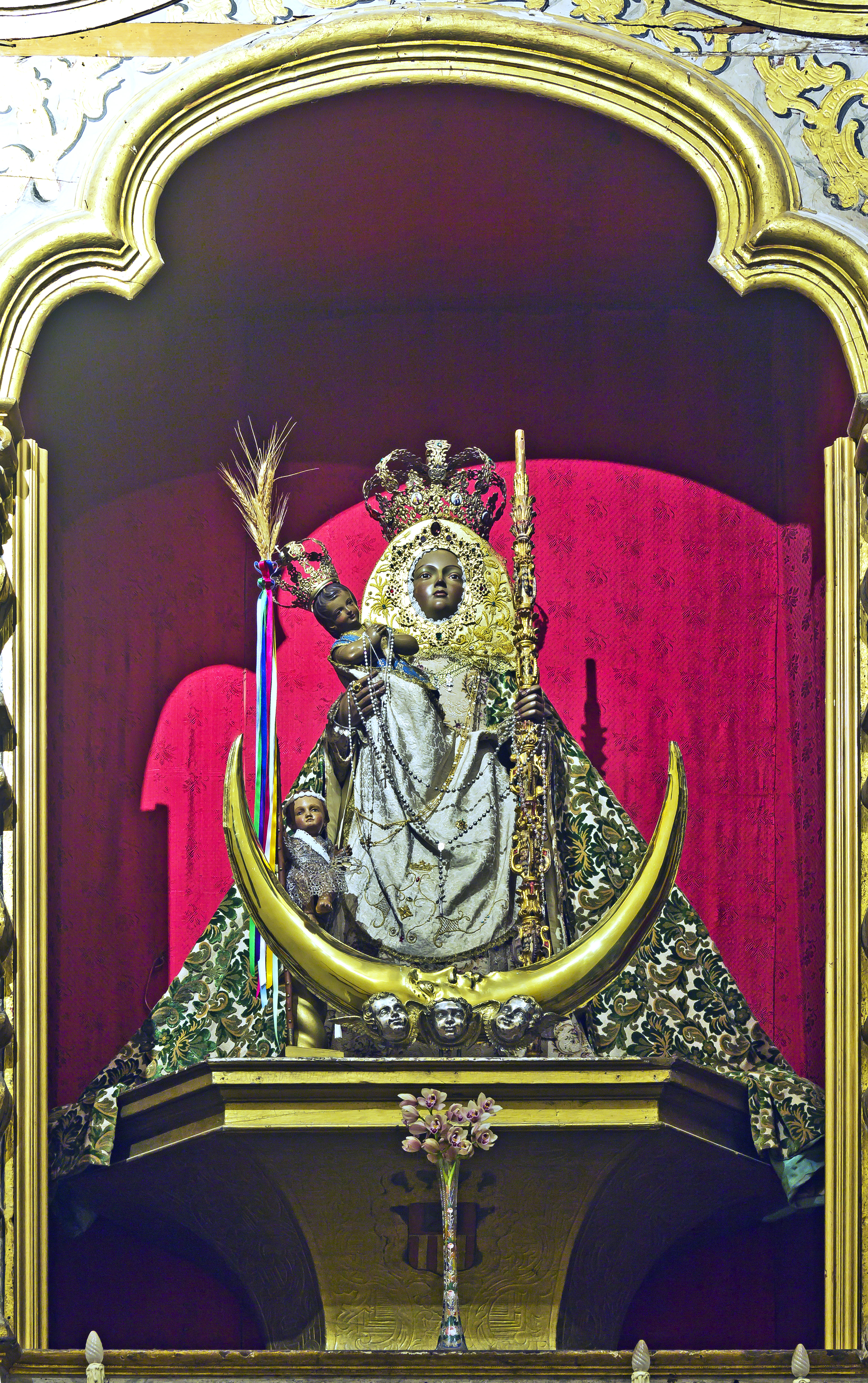
Virgin of Candelaria

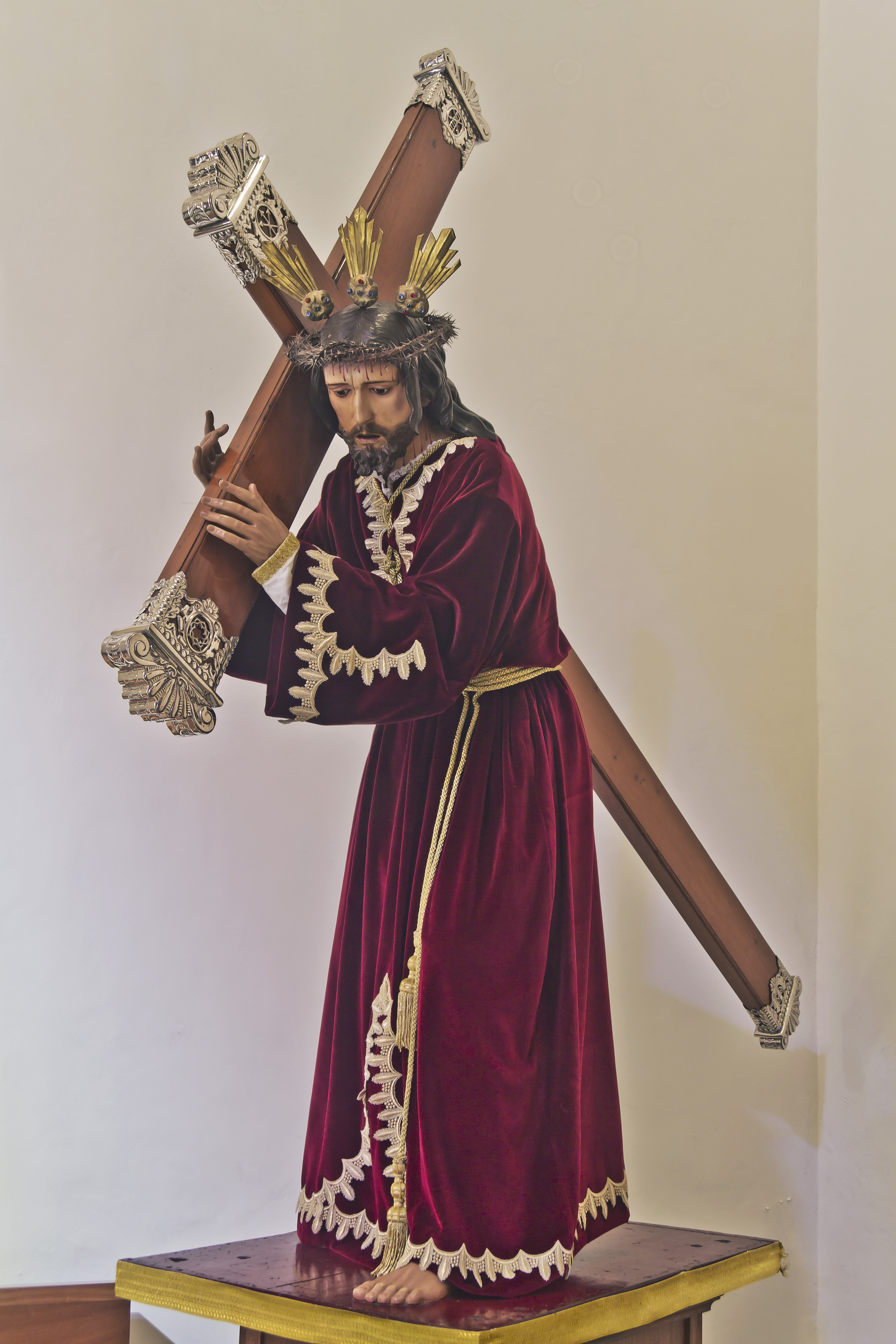
Christ Nazarene

=== Chapel of Saint Joseph of Nazareth ===
The image of Saint Joseph of Nazareth is dressed in rich robes of cloth and dates from the late seventeenth century by Lázaro González de Ocampo. The figure of the Child Jesus is from a later period. There are also sculptures of Saint Anne and Saint Joachim, which are considered masterpieces of eighteenth-century Canarian art. At the top of the altar is a small wooden statue of Saint Jerome.

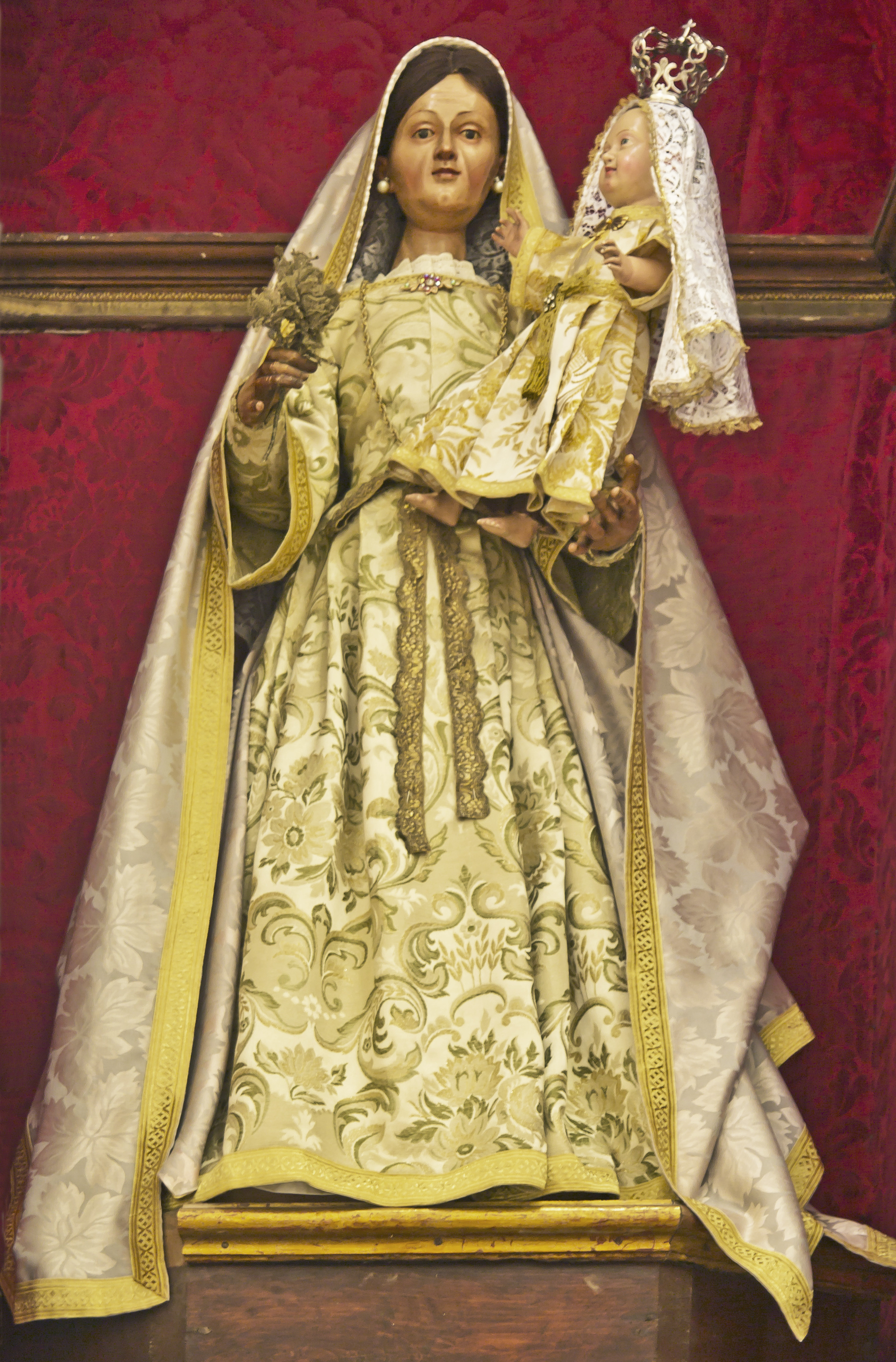
Saint Anne

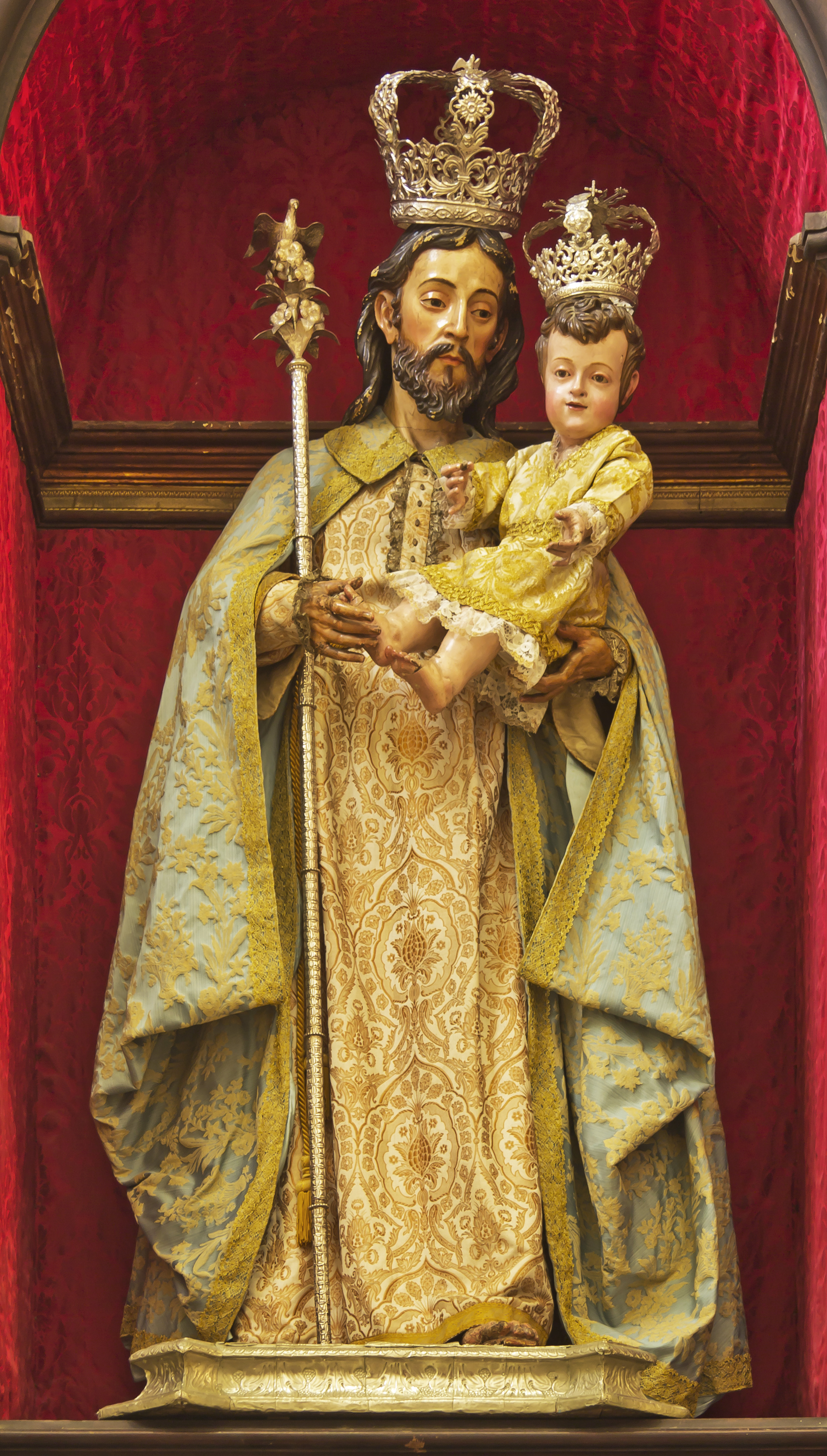
Saint Joseph of Nazareth

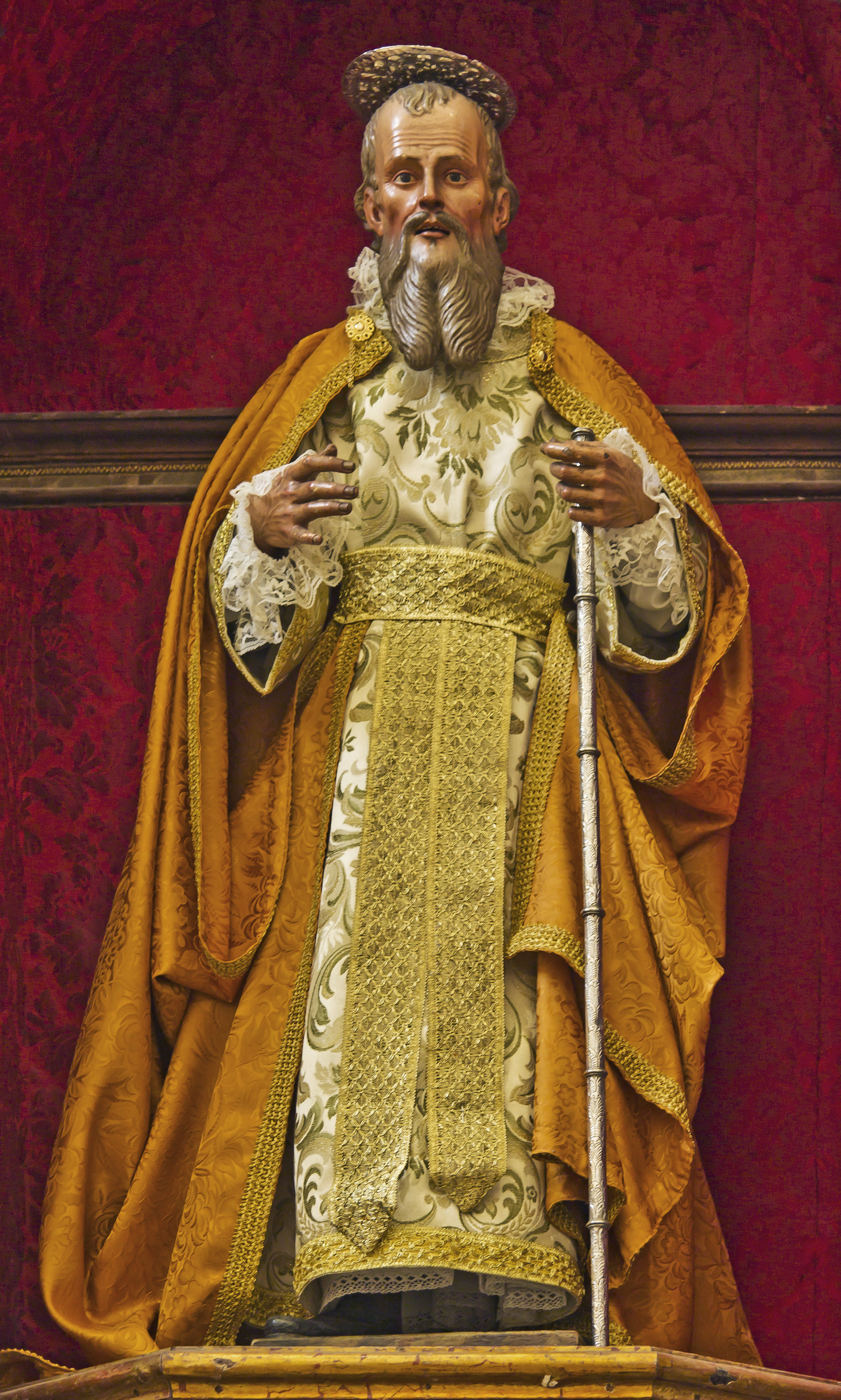
Saint Joachim

=== Chapel of Saint Barbara ===
The altarpiece of Saint Barbara is neo-Gothic. It was designed by Francisco Bonnin Guerin and created by members of the artillery corps de Santa Cruz de Tenerife. This altarpiece was initially in the Church of Saint Francis of Assisi in Santa Cruz de Tenerife. Also in this chapel is the altarpiece of Our Lady of La Salette donated by Estanislada González in 1915.

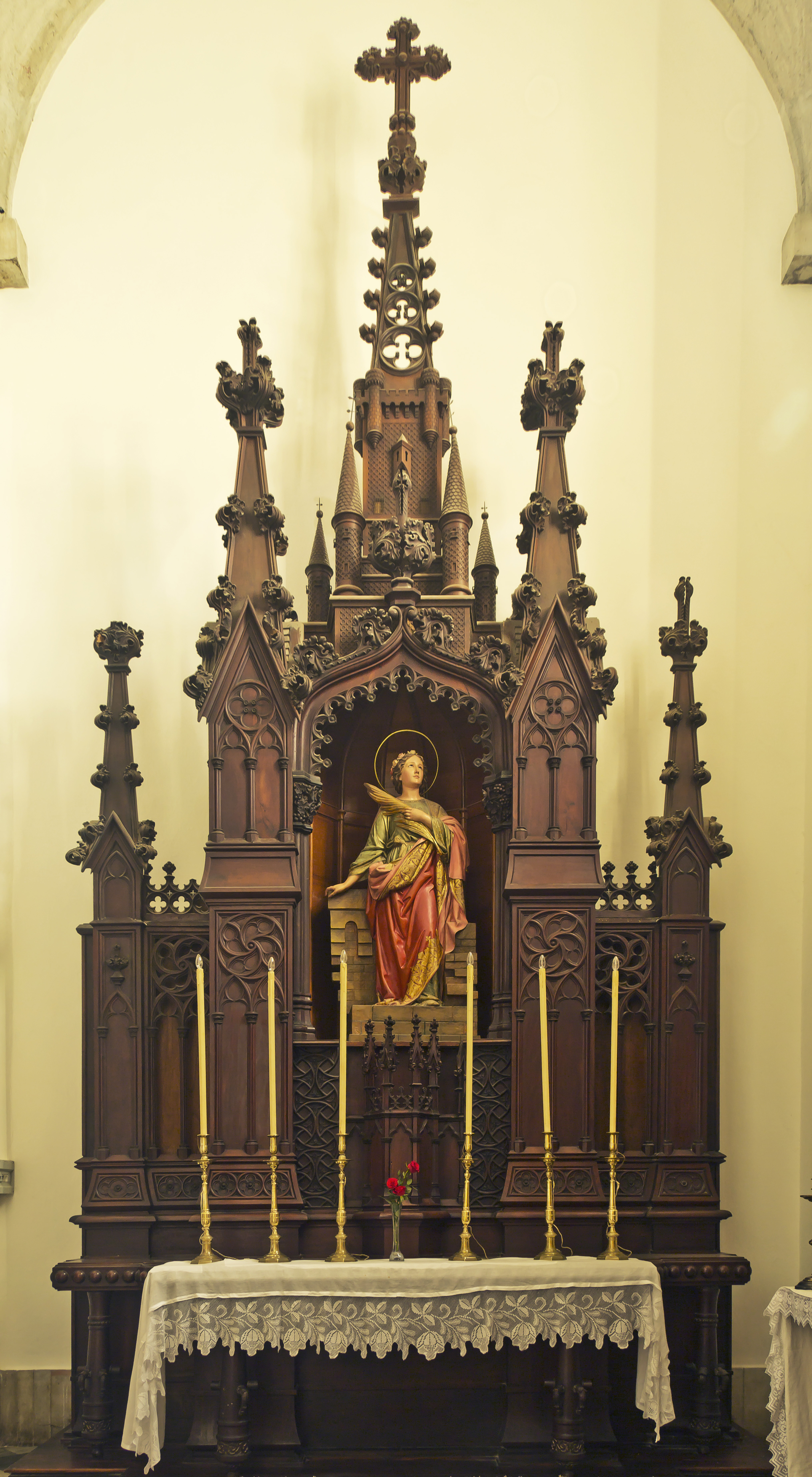
Neo-Gothic altarpiece of Saint Barbara

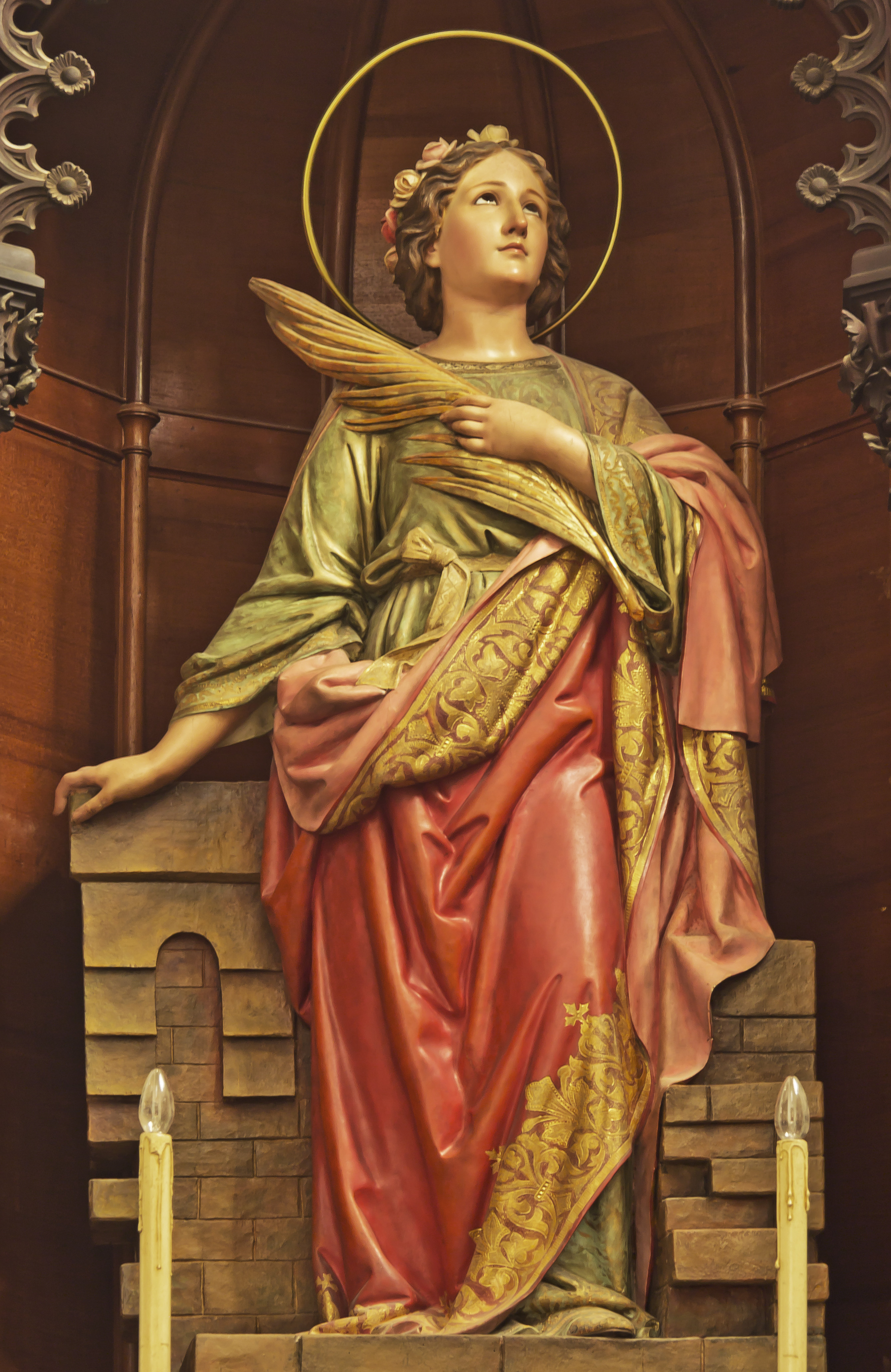
Sculpture of Saint Barbara

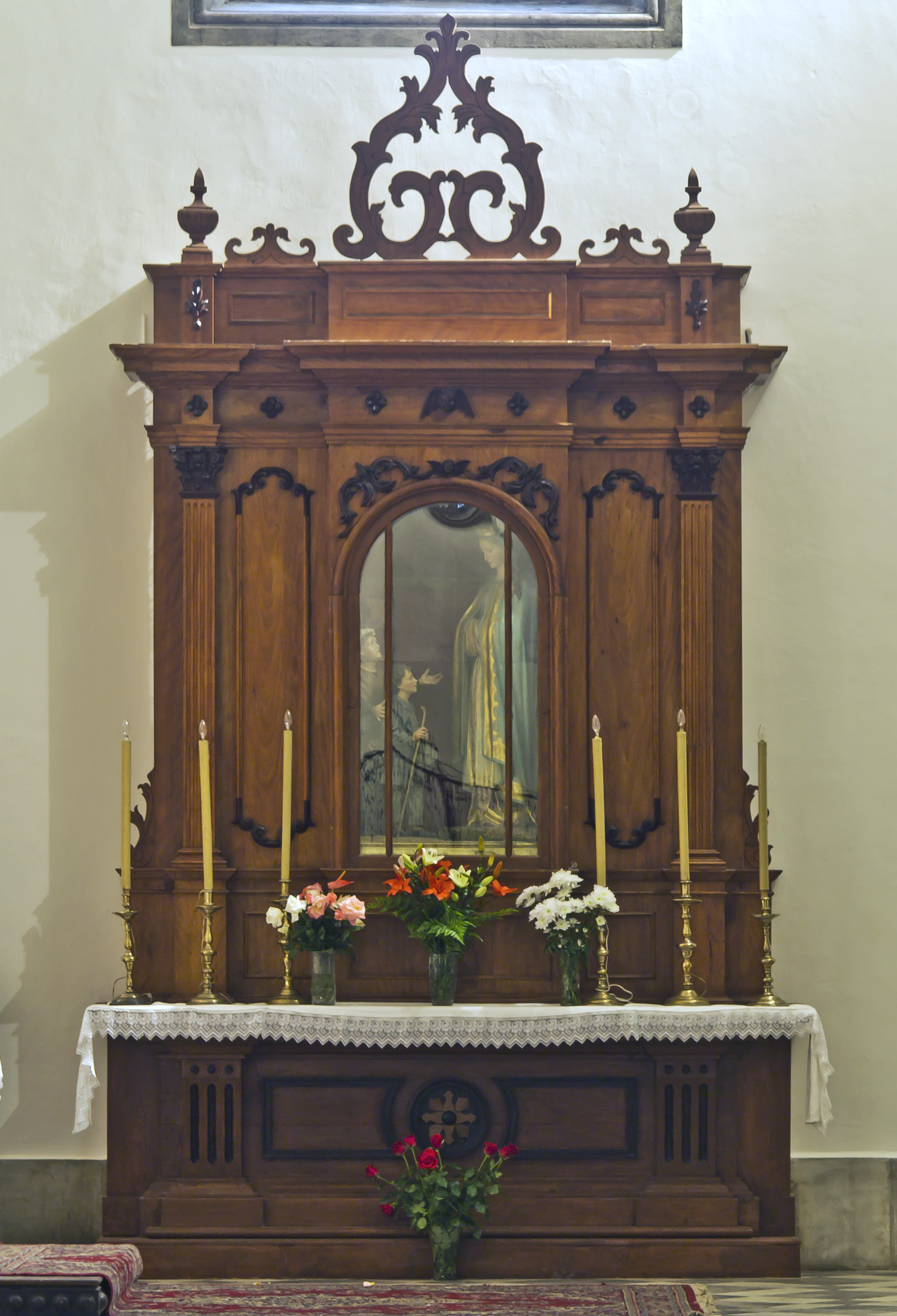
Altarpiece of Our Lady of La Salette

=== Chapel of Our Lady of Mount Carmel ===
The altarpiece of the Our Lady of Mount Carmel is another neo-Gothic altarpiece. In the center is the image of the Virgin of Mount Carmel dressed in baroque style, which has been in the cathedral since 1619. In the lateral niches are sculptures of Saint Andrew the Apostle and Saint Therese of Lisieux. On one side is the image of Christ of Burgos. The original sculpture of the Christ who was venerated in the city was destroyed in 1964 due to a fire in the Convent of San Agustín where his statue had been.

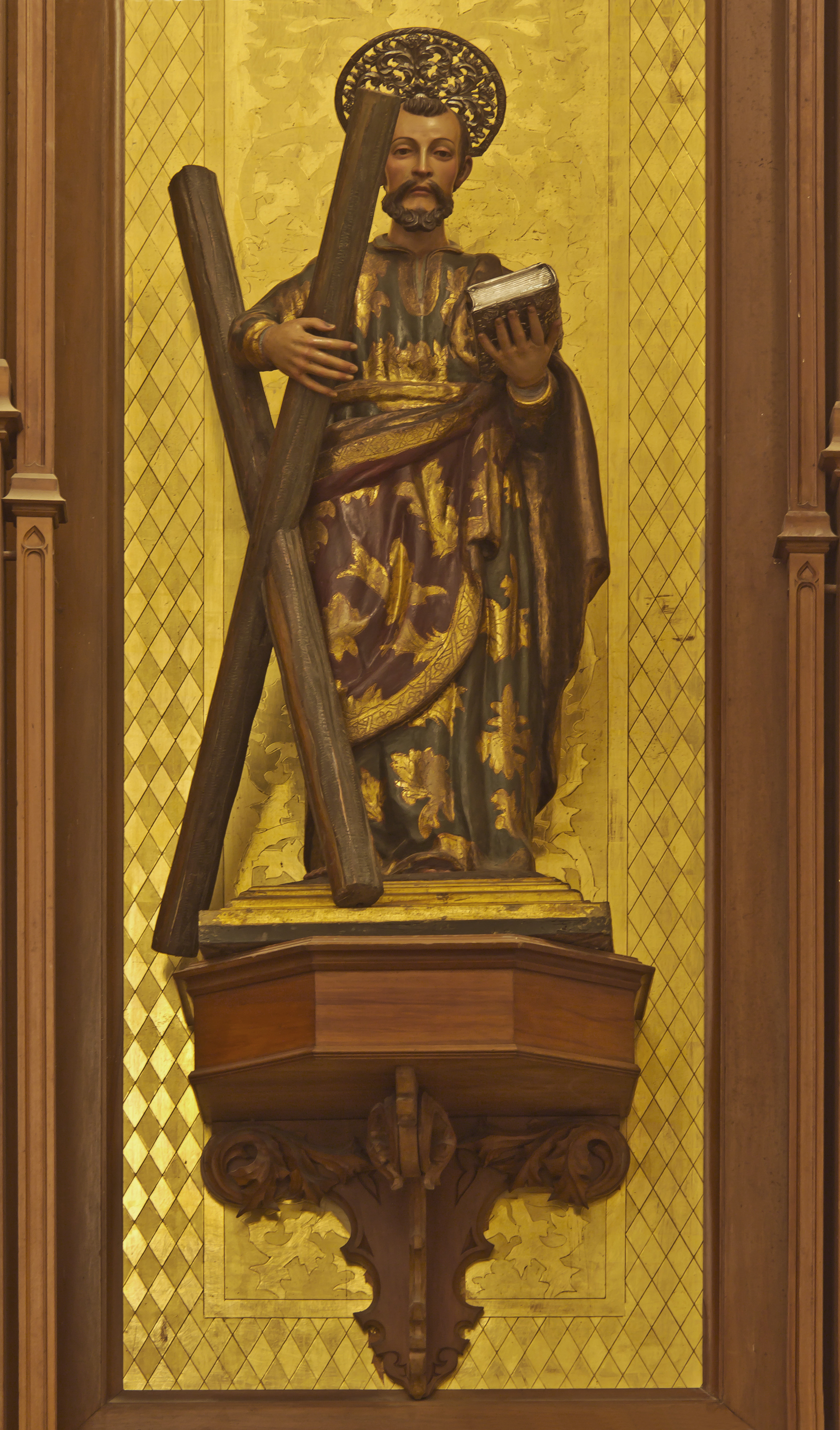
Saint Andrew the Apostle

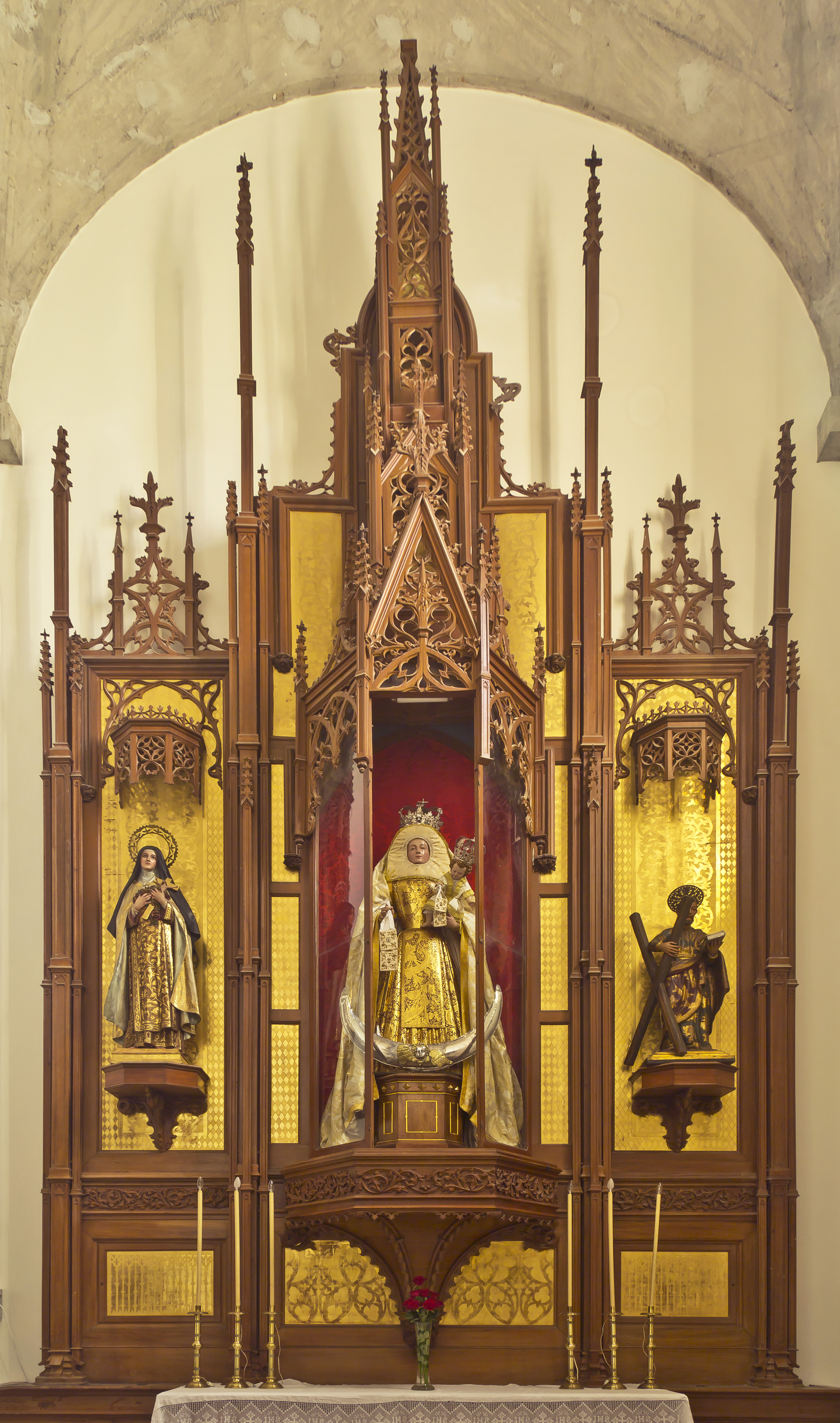
Altarpiece of the Our Lady of Mount Carmel

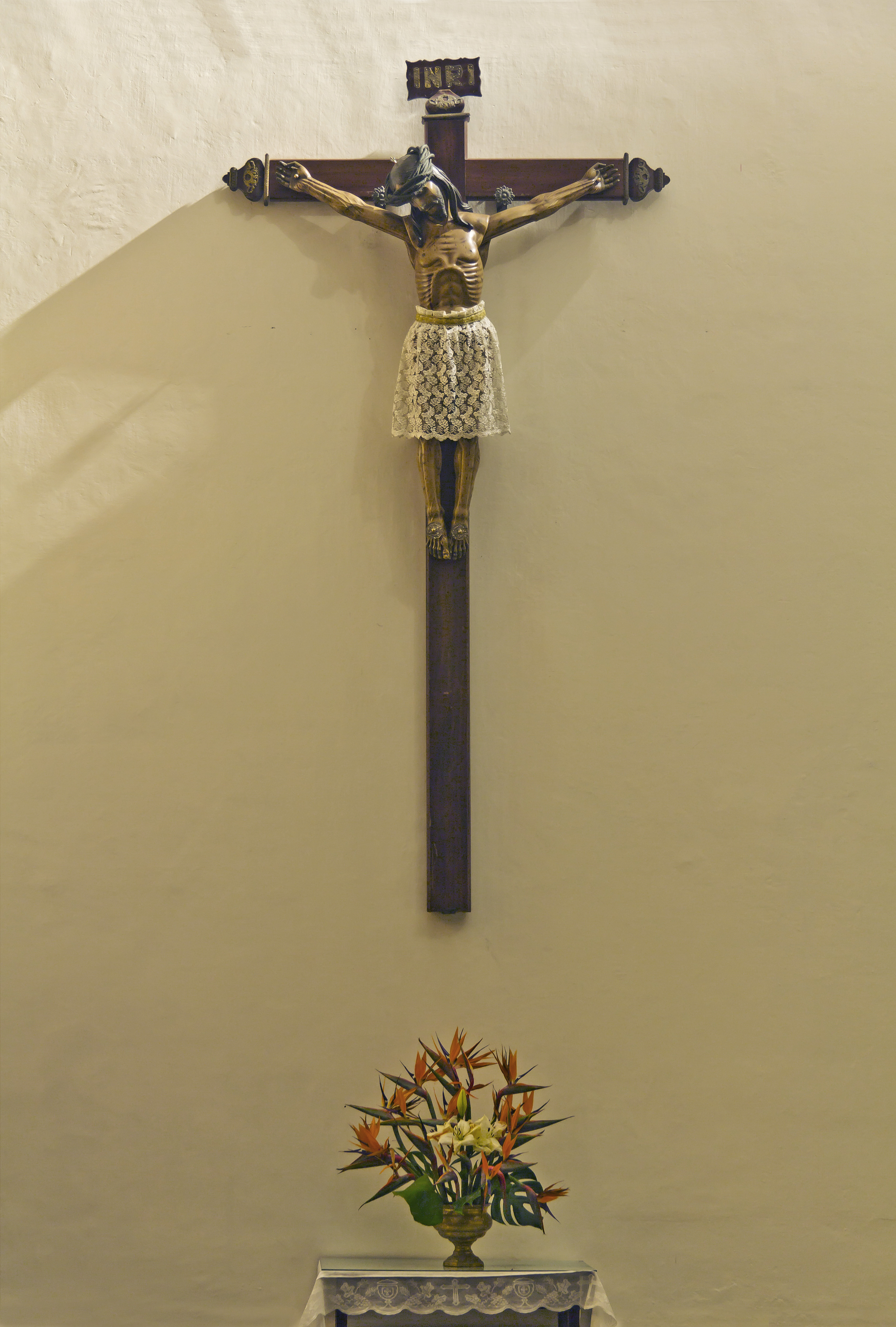
Christ of Burgos

=== Chapel of the Baptistery ===
Most of this chapel is occupied by a baptismal font from 1969. Also in this chapel is the altarpiece of Saint Thomas Aquinas where is the statue of the saint. Next to it is the image of the Virgin of Mercy, which was created by sculptor José Rodríguez de la Oliva. Another image that is in this chapel is Saint Lawrence of Rome, probably dating from the second half of the seventeenth century.

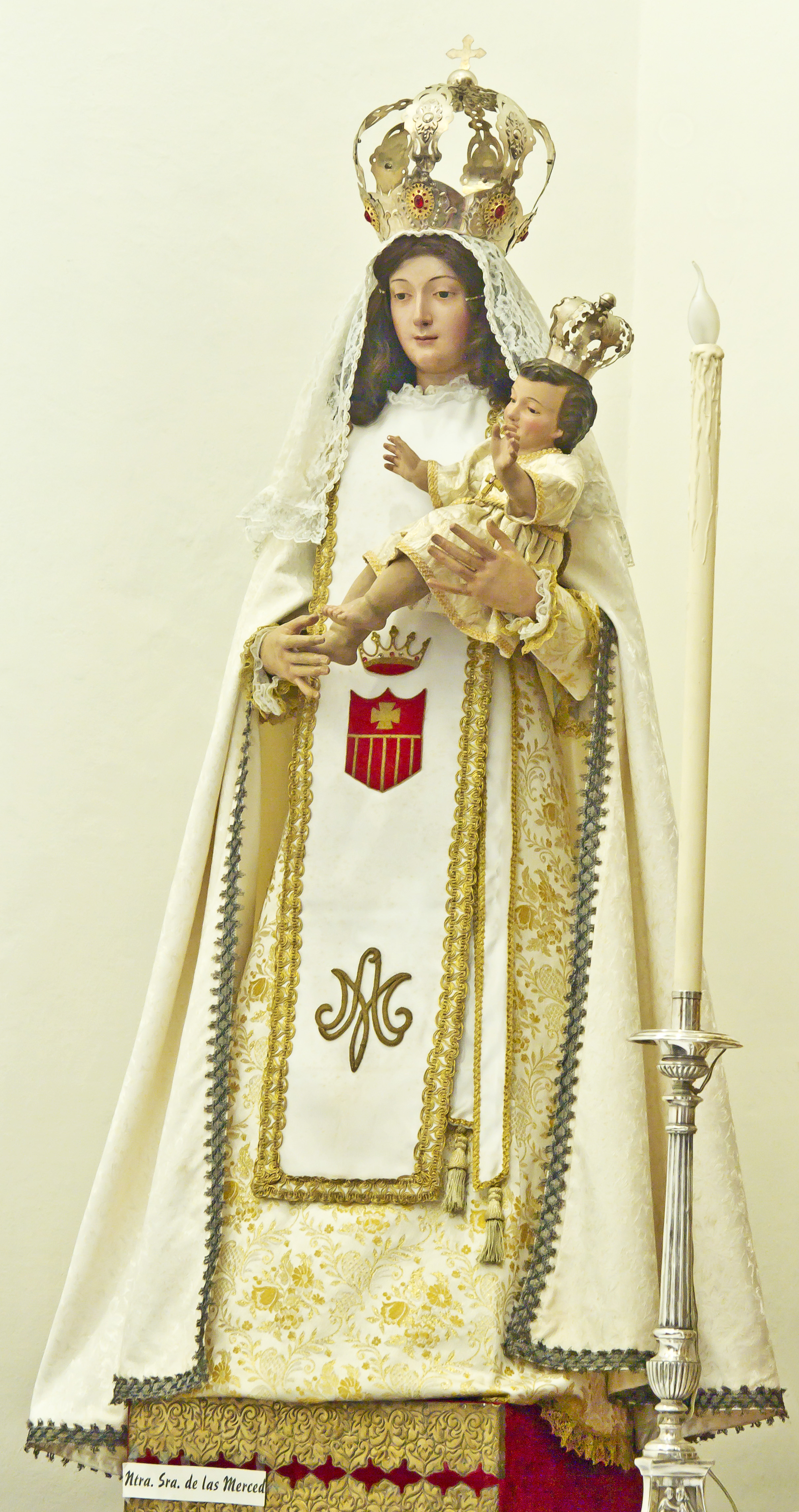
Virgin of Mercy

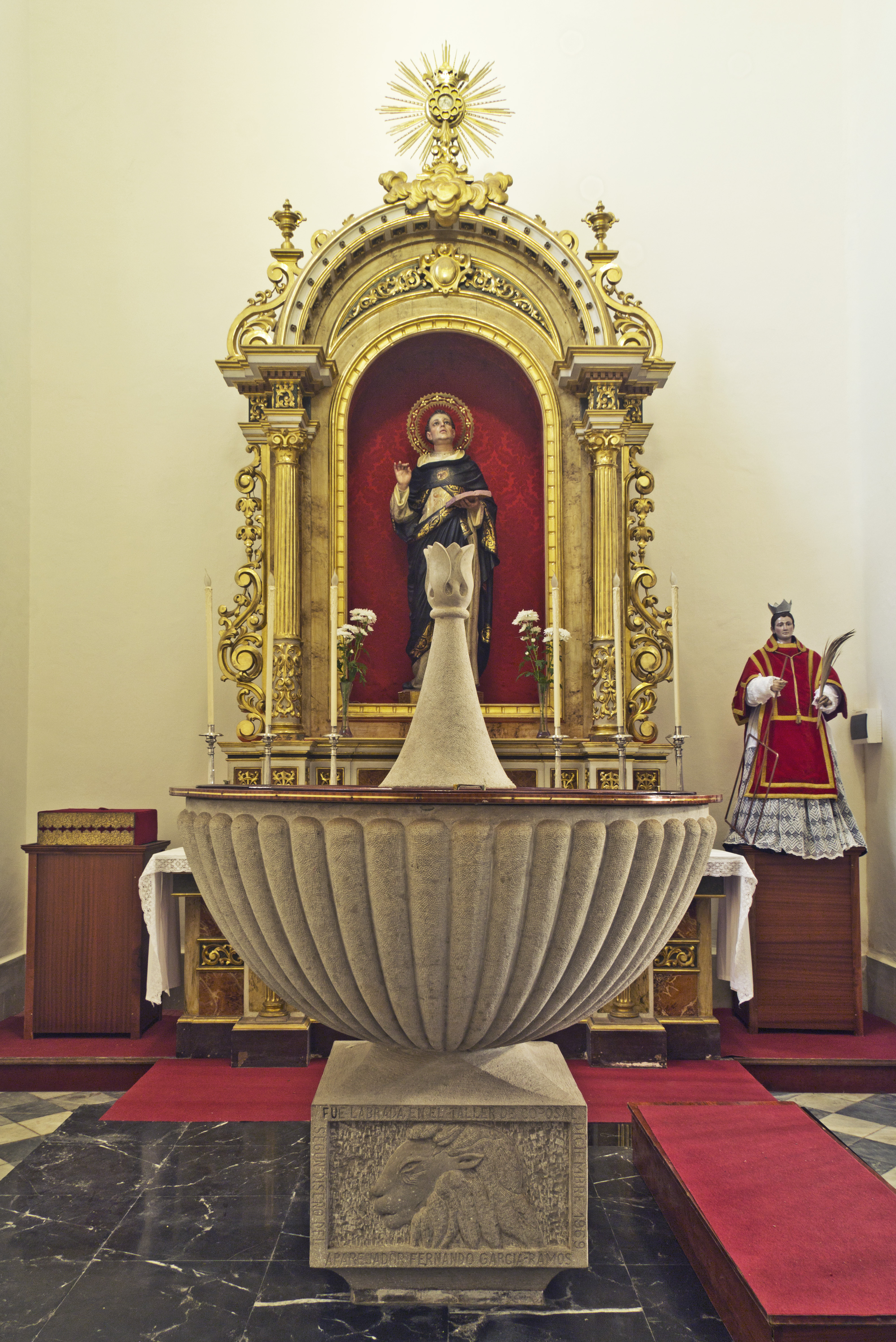
Altarpiece of Saint Thomas Aquinas and baptismal font

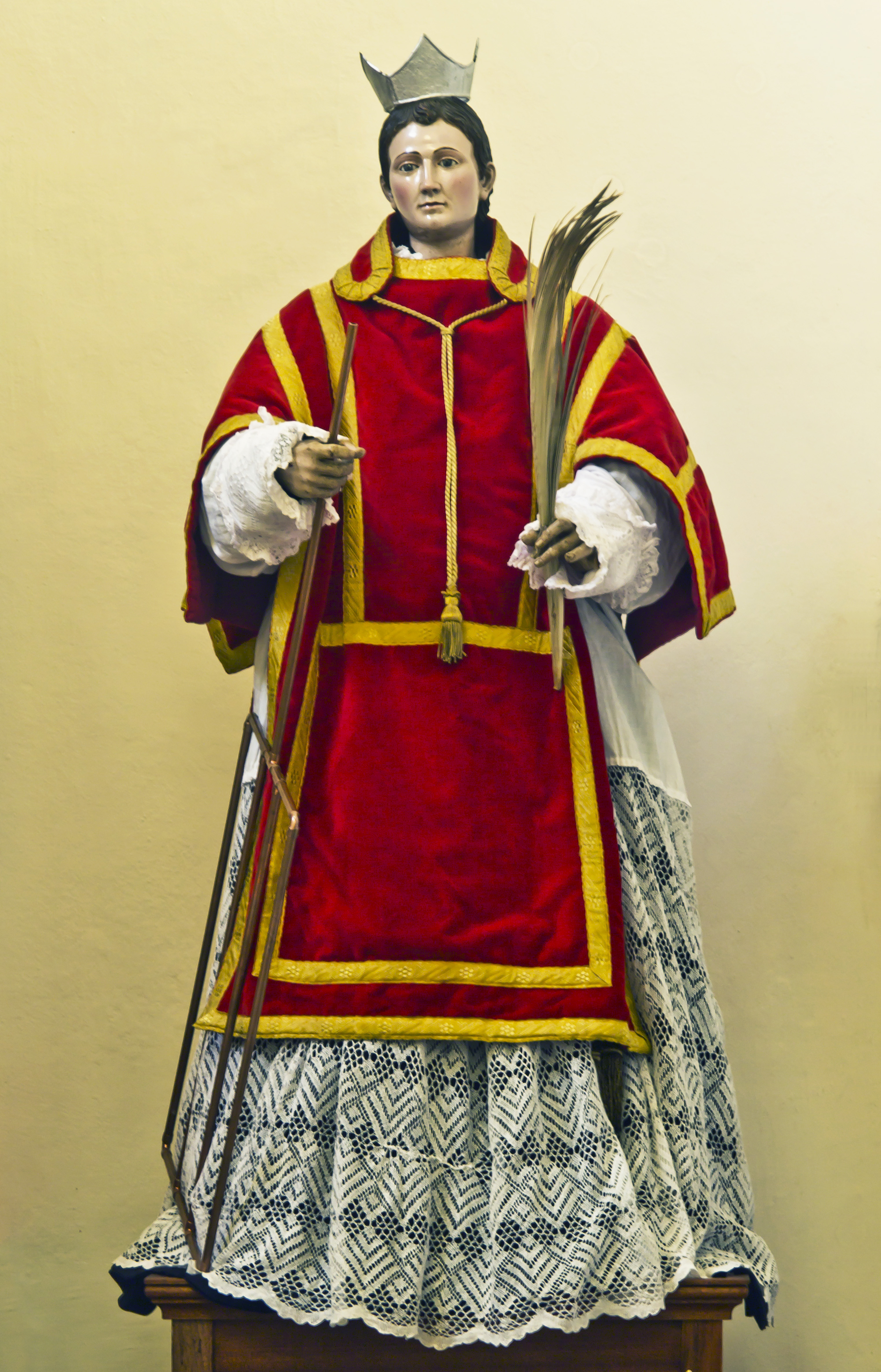
Saint Lawrence of Rome

=== Chapel of Our Lady of Remedies ===
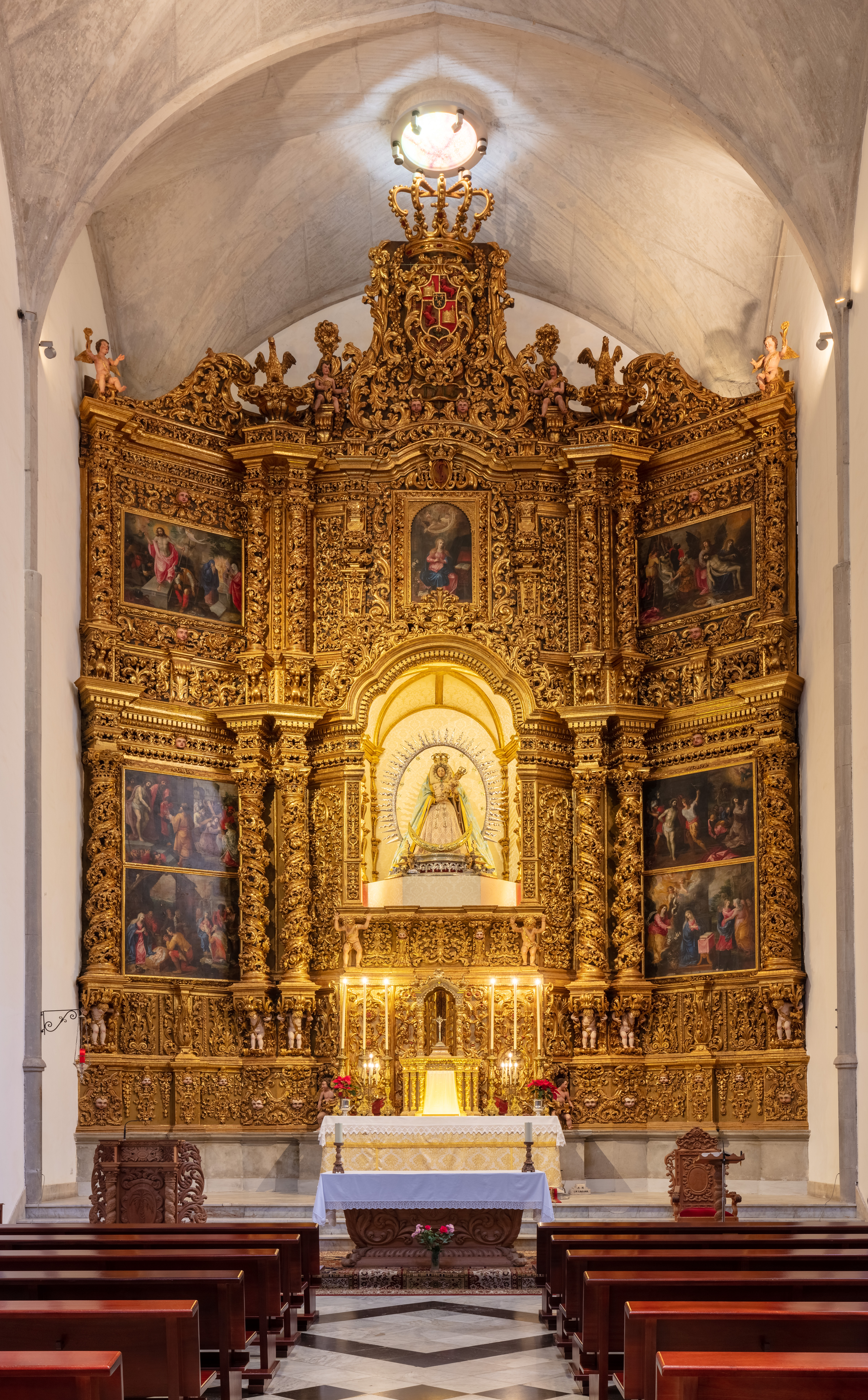
Altarpiece of Our Lady of Remedies

The highlight of the interior of the cathedral is the altarpiece of Our Lady of Remedies, patron saint of the city of San Cristóbal de La Laguna, of the island of Tenerife and the Diocese of San Cristóbal de La Laguna and of the Marian devotion to which the cathedral is consecrated. Her feast is celebrated on 8 September.

The altarpiece of the Our Lady of Remedies is in a chapel in the transept of the cathedral and is the largest altarpiece in the Canary Islands. It is a great Baroque altarpiece from the first half of the eighteenth century, with an impressive set of seven panels attributed to Hendrick Van Balen, Van Dyck's teacher. The image of the Virgin of Los Remedios is located in the central niche and is adorned in rich robes and dresses. It is located in a spectacular canopy over a silver throne, with a sunburst of the same framing material and a golden crescent moon at her feet.

=== Other artworks ===
Inside is a pulpit of Carraran Italian marble carved by Pasquale Bocciardo (considered the best work done in marble of the Canary Islands), and part of Mazuelos's Altarpiece. In addition, there are valuable works by Cristóbal Hernández de Quintana, Luján Pérez and Fernando Estévez.

Also inside the cathedral is the image of Christ of Los Remedios, which is considered the twin of Cristo de La Laguna. This image is located on the marble tabernacle of the main altar. The image dates from the sixteenth century and is by an unknown artist. The temple also houses a large canvas with the theme The Souls of Purgatory by the painter Cristóbal Hernández de Quintana, and a painting of the Last Supper, the work of Juan de Miranda.

Inside the cathedral the relics of the martyrs are preserved: Saint Aurelio de Córdoba, Saint Faustino, Saint Venusto and Saint Amado Nusco, plus a piece of the mantle of Saint Ferdinand and a bone of James the Less. But the most important relics of the cathedral are those belonging to the two saints of the Canary Islands, Peter of Saint Joseph Betancur and José de Anchieta.

The Treasure of the Cathedral of La Laguna covers a period from the sixteenth century to the present. Most of the pieces correspond to the seventeenth and eighteenth centuries. This treasure is the set pieces goldsmith largest of the Canary Islands, among which two silver candlesticks are the largest in Spain, among many other pieces. In addition to the treasure they include religious carvings, suits and coats, ornaments, pictures, etc.

The cathedral houses, as relics, the vestments and liturgical items used by Pope Leo XIV during his Visit by visit to Tenerife in 2026: the chalice with which he celebrated Mass at the port of Santa Cruz de Tenerife, the missal, the lectionary, the mitre, and a booklet signed by him.

== Music ==
After the creation of the Diocese of San Cristóbal de La Laguna and the subsequent declaration of the Parish of Our Lady of Los Remedios to the rank of cathedral, the temple becomes a major center of musical production.

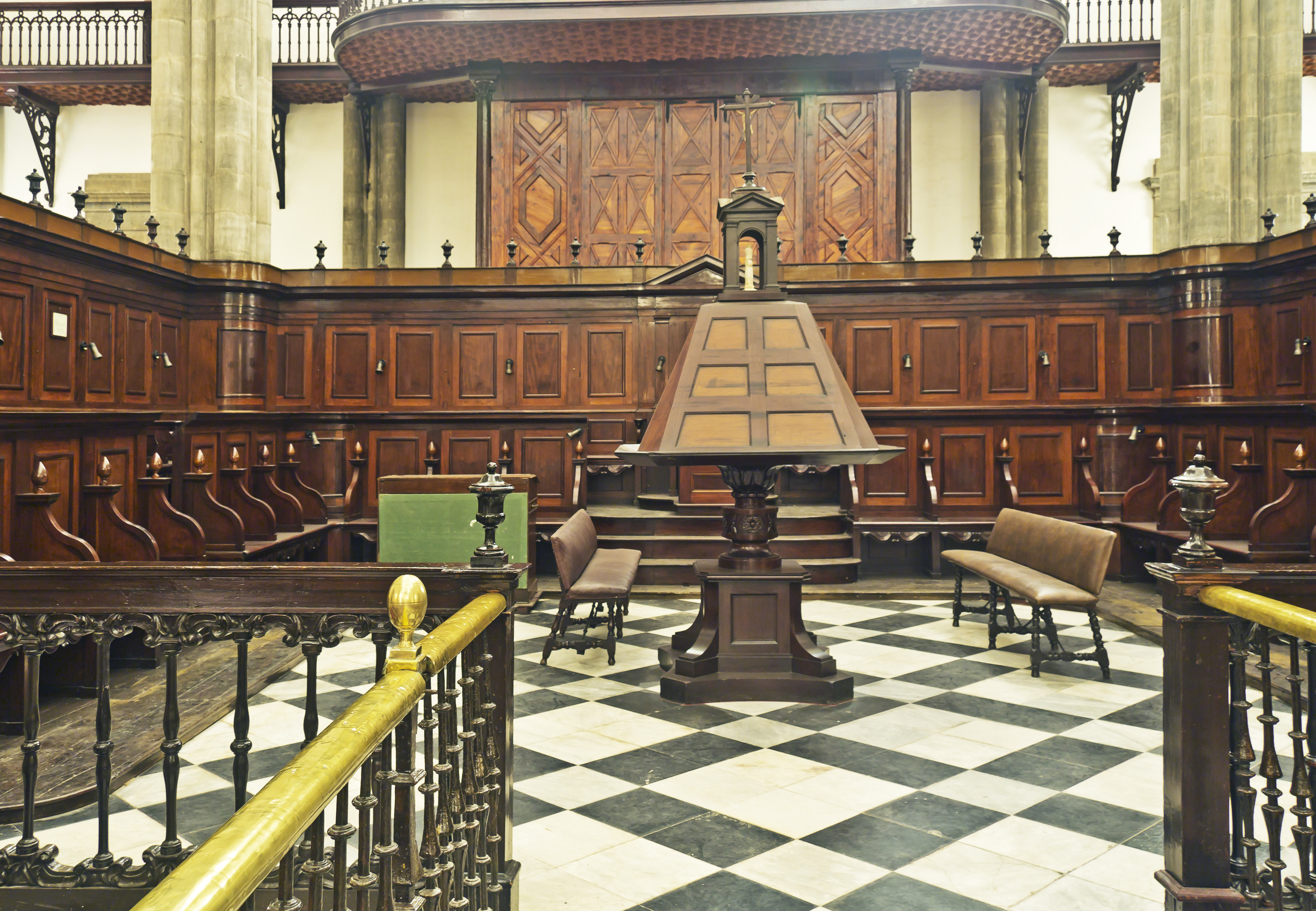
Choir of the Cathedral of La Laguna

Music chapel attached to the cathedral was created. He served as choirmaster composer Miguel Jurado Bustamante born in Cádiz. Among the major composers of the cathedral include: Remigio Oliva, Manuel Fragoso and Nicolás González.

The musical production of Miguel Jurado Bustamante covers all genres of religious music in Latin (masses, motets, psalms, Magnificats, hymns, litanies, lamentations, responses and antiphons dedicated to the Virgin Mary) and Castilian (carols). Some 140 works have been located thus far by this composer, representing a large output.

Miguel Jurado trained other local musicians, the most important of whom was Domingo Crisanto Delgado Gómez, one of the most famous composers from the Canaries in the nineteenth century, who in 1836 would become the first organist of the Cathedral of San Juan Bautista of Puerto Rico. Crisanto's production is predominantly vocal and choral, not only a cappella but also with accompaniment of organ, piano or instrumental group.

Finally, another great composer who worked at the cathedral was Domingo Herrera Guillén, of whom only a single work is preserved.

== Chapter house and icon museum ==
The chapter house is home to the cathedral chapter, also called the Chapter of Canons, which constitutes the corporation of priests responsible to serve in cult of the cathedral and its religious and cultural activities. The building is a well-known Canarian house of the eighteenth century, attached to the building of the cathedral.

It houses the icons museum, which contains the largest collection of Byzantine icons of Spain, with 160 original pieces that are mostly about 300 years old. These artworks are owned by the Diocese of Tenerife and come mainly from countries such as Russia, Romania, Yugoslavia, Italy and Greece. These pieces came to Tenerife through private donations to the bishopric and through merchants who arrived in the Canary Islands.

La Laguna Cathedral is one of the few Catholic cathedrals in the world with a museum dedicated to Eastern Orthodox art.

== Acts ==
In the cathedral great acts and religious celebrations are celebrated. During Holy Week, the cathedral becomes the center of popular devotion in the city of La Laguna, because different brotherhoods and fraternities throughout the city perform their penitential station in the cathedral with their respective processional steps. Among these processional steps highlights the image of the Cristo de La Laguna (which is one of the most venerated images of the Canary Islands) and that every Holy Friday moves to this cathedral, which leaves hours later in the Magna Procession.

The image of the Christ revisits the temple in its September celebrations, on this occasion it remains in solemn quinary (from 9 to 14 September). For its part, also in September the feast of Our Lady of Remedies, patron saint of the cathedral and the Diocese of Nivariense, whose main day is 8 September and which highlights the procession of the Virgin through the streets. Every February 2 highlights the procession of Las Candelas with the image of Our Lady of Candelaria that is venerated in the cathedral. Other important events are the patron saint festival of the city, Saint Christopher (in La Laguna held on 27 July), the Corpus Christi procession (Sunday after the feast of the Holy Trinity) and the feast of Saint José de Anchieta, every 9 June, among others.

== Other data of the cathedral ==
=== Immurement of the Cathedral of La Laguna ===
Immurement is a form of extreme ascetic devotion that proliferated during the Middle Ages, and consisted of voluntary seclusion (especially of women) inside small rooms located next to the main altar of the temples, and connected to it by a grid window to attend mass and receive communion.

In the old church located in the place of the current Cathedral of La Laguna, the only case of immurement registered in the Canary Islands took place in the sixteenth century. This is the case of Isabel de la Cruz, who had created a religious brotherhood before. When she died, her niece, María de las Vírgenes, and later her niece, María Emerenciana, followed him in the vow. The latter had in fact been raised by her aunt in said immurement since her childhood.

=== Apparition of the Virgin of Los Remedios ===
John of Jesus Hernández y Delgado was a seventeenth-century Franciscan friar who lived in the convent of San Diego del Monte, outside the city walls of La Laguna. John of Jesus said he had seen the Virgin of Los Remedios blessing the city from the top of the tower of his temple, the current Cathedral of La Laguna. This vision was disclosed in the sermons made by the priesthood during the friar's funeral.

=== Relevant baptisms ===
In the old church of Los Remedios were baptized: José de Anchieta in 1534, saint and missionary in Brazil and Amaro Pargo in 1678, corsair and merchant, among other personalities.

== Gallery ==
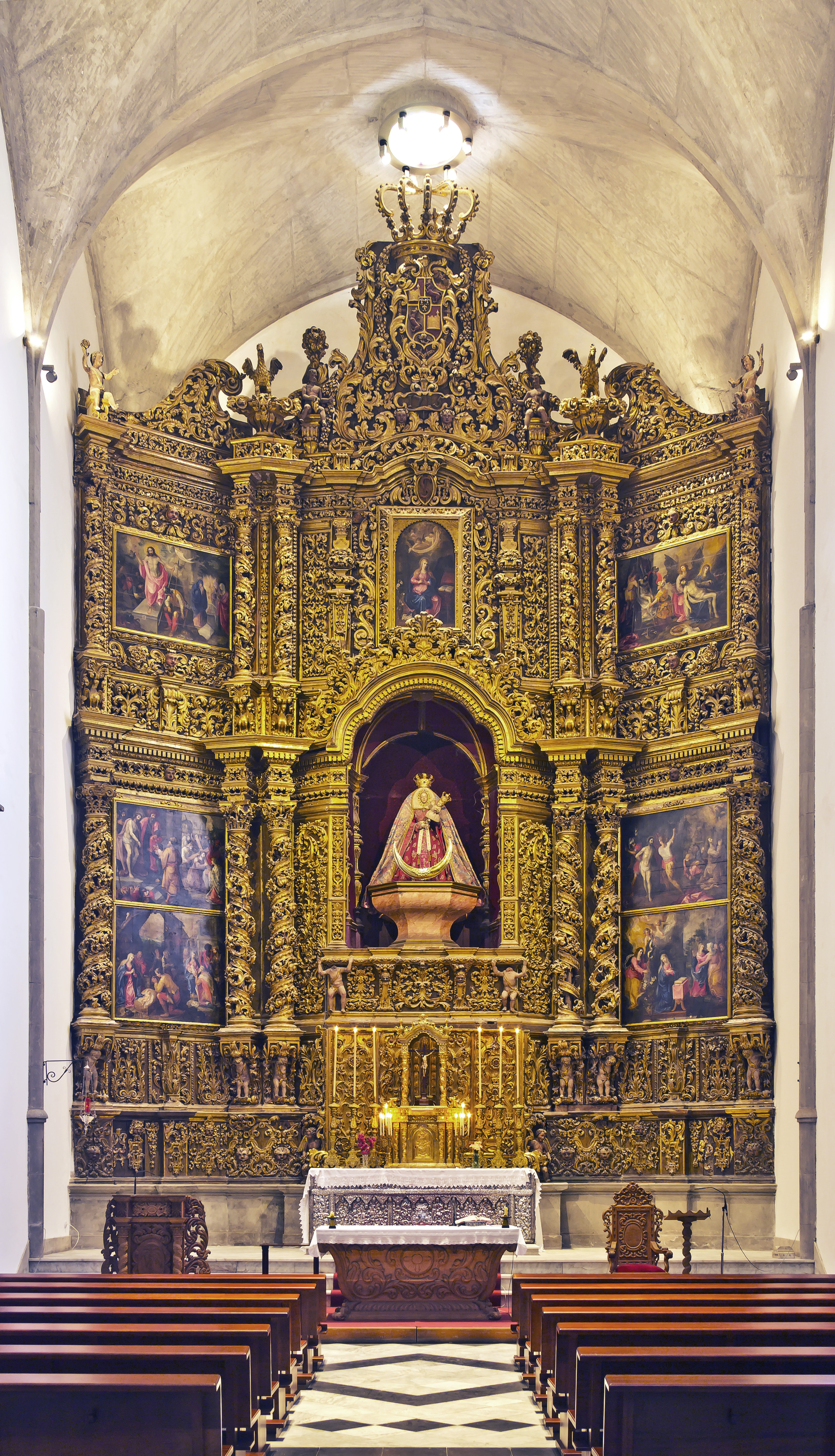
Baroque altarpiece of the Virgin of the Remedies

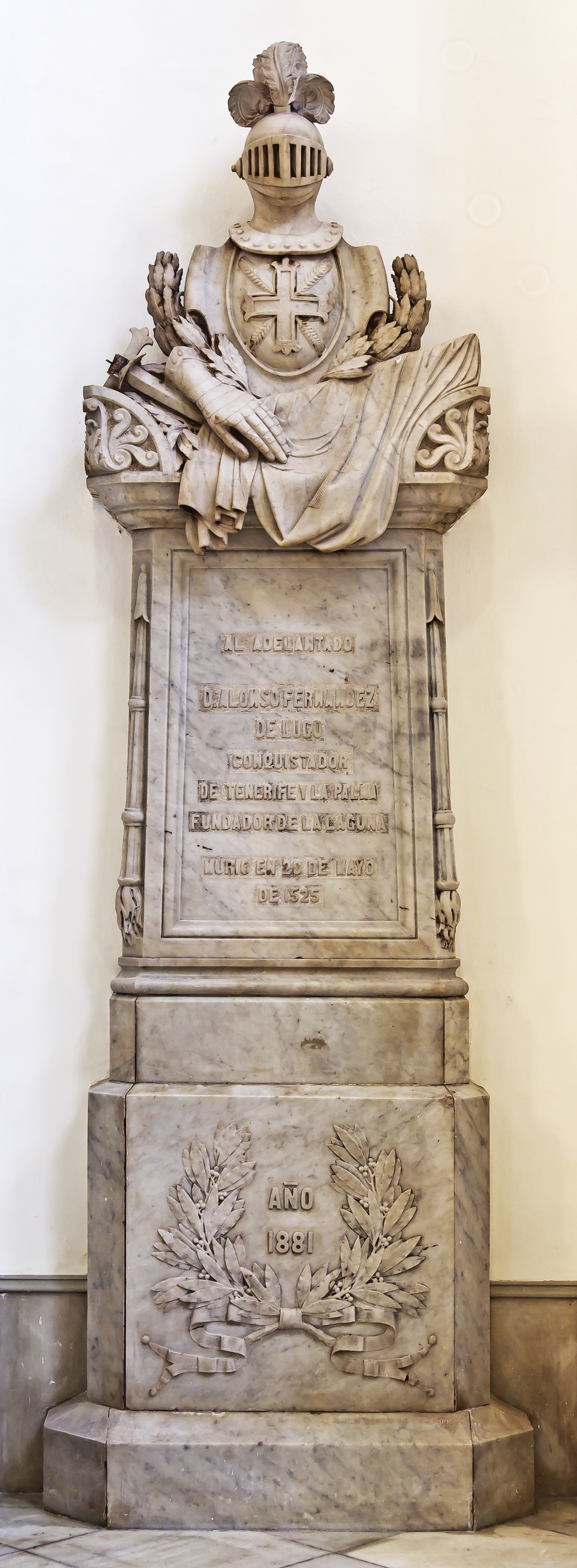
Tomb of Alonso Fernández de Lugo, conqueror of the island and city founder

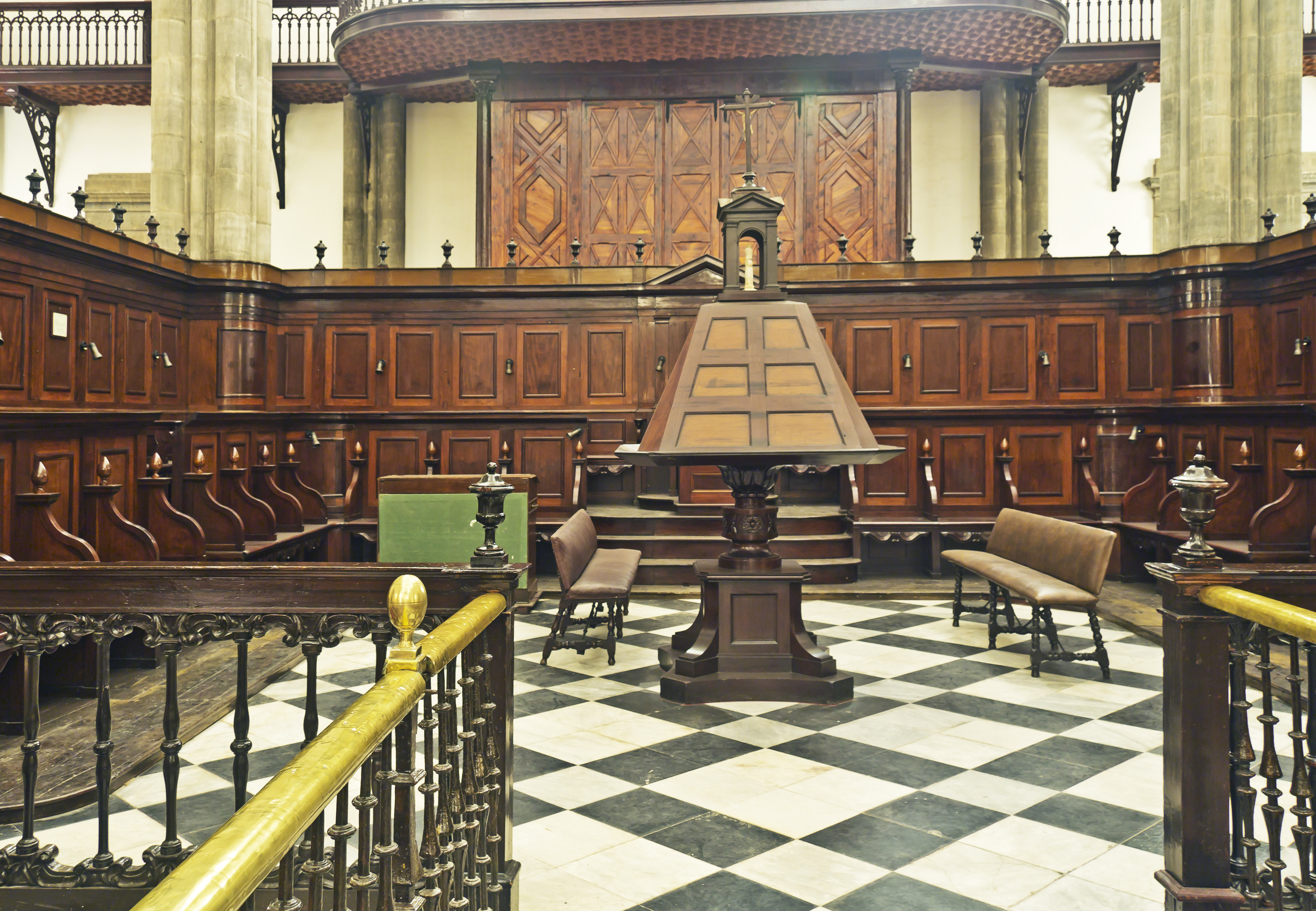
Choir

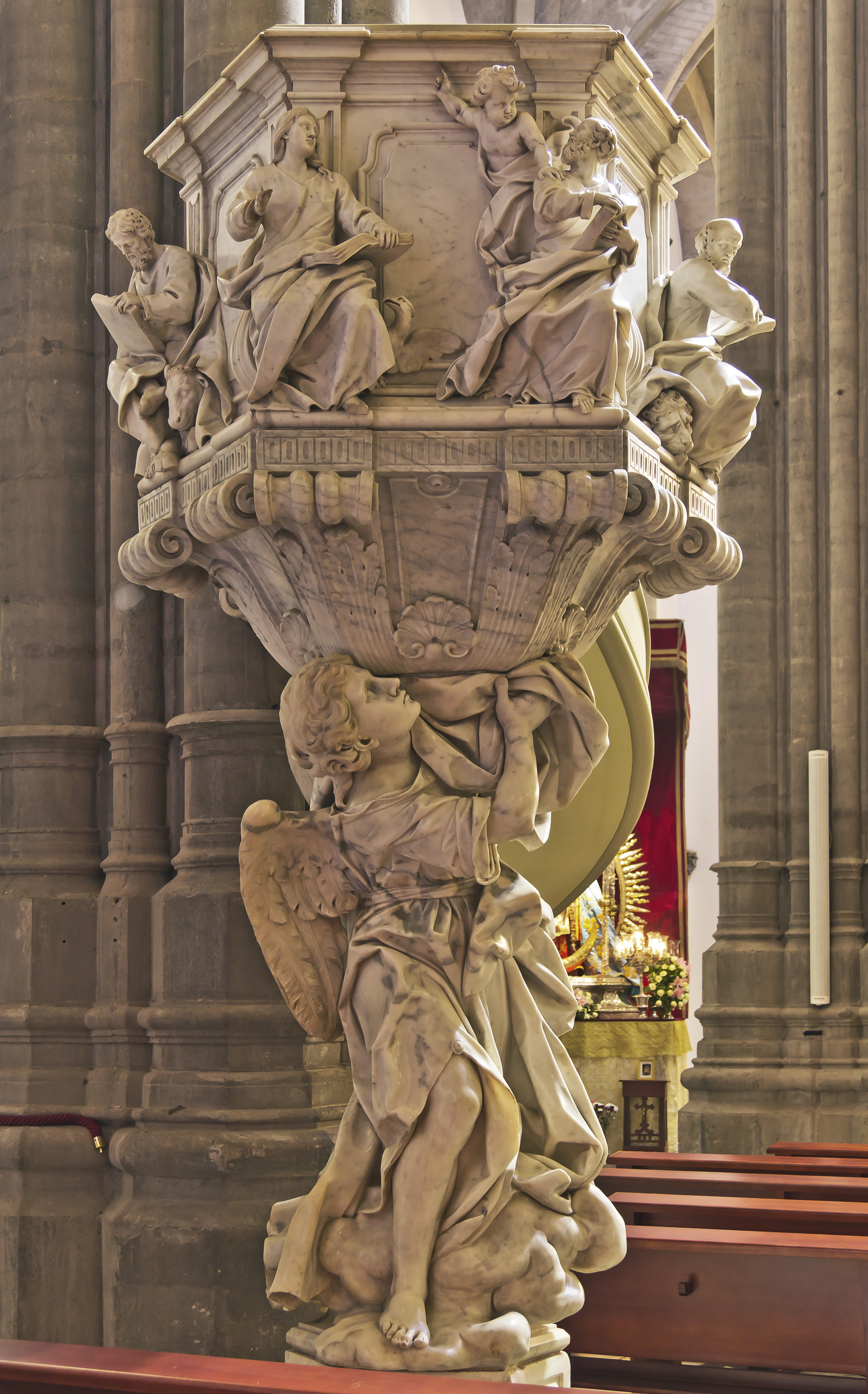
Marble pulpit designed by Pasquale Bocciardo

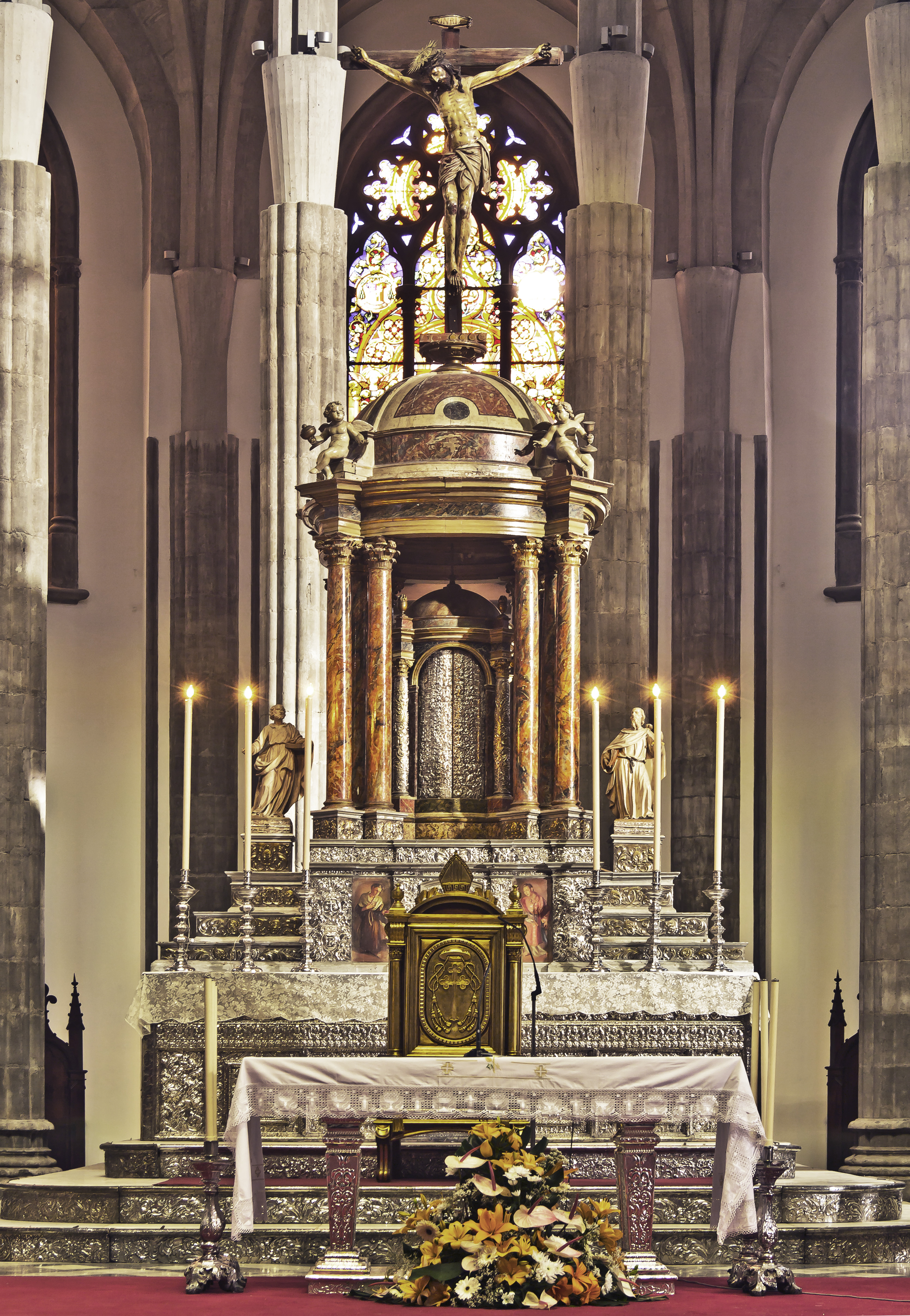
Tabernacle of the main altar

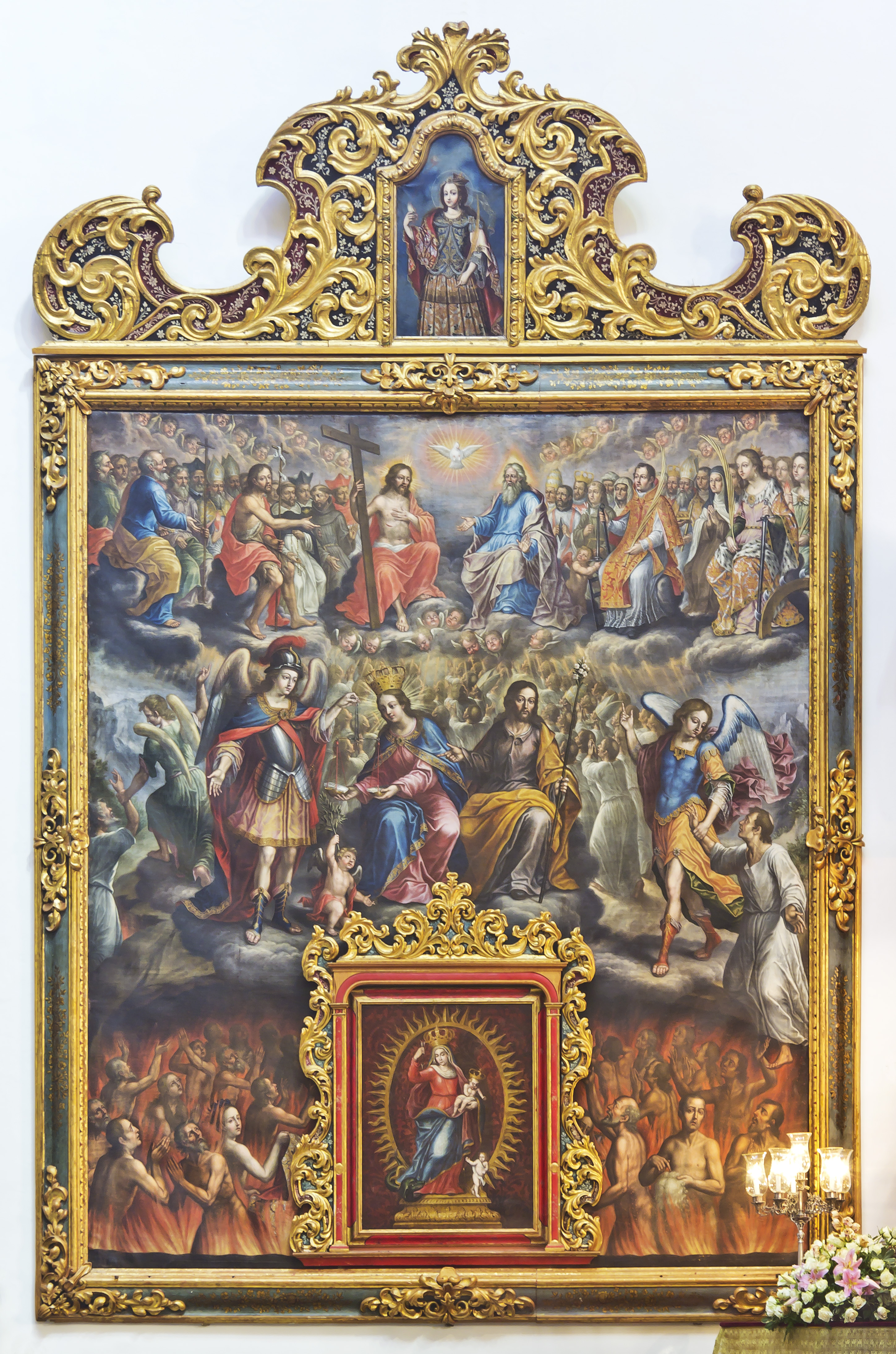
Table of Souls in Purgatory

== See also ==
- Roman Catholic Diocese of San Cristóbal de La Laguna
- Real Santuario del Santísimo Cristo de La Laguna
- Basilica of Candelaria
- San Cristóbal de La Laguna
