= Bernardo Álvarez Afonso =

Spanish Catholic bishop (1949–2025)

The Most Reverend Bernardo Álvarez Afonso
- Bishop Emeritus of San Cristóbal de La Laguna
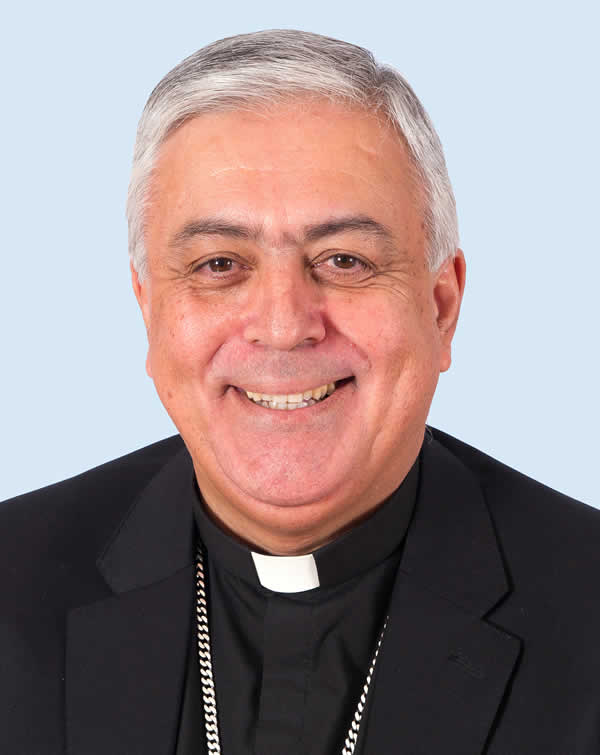
- Church: Catholic Church
- Archdiocese: Seville
- See: San Cristóbal de La Laguna
- Appointed: 29 June 2005
- Term ended: 16 September 2024
- Predecessor: Felipe Fernández García
- Successor: Eloy Alberto Santiago

Orders
- Ordination: 16 July 1976
- Consecration: 4 September 2005 by Manuel Monteiro de Castro

Personal details
- Born: 29 July 1949 Breña Alta, Spain
- Died: 25 November 2025 (aged 76) San Cristóbal de La Laguna, Spain
- Motto: OMNIBUS OMNIA FACTUS SUM / ME HE HECHO TODO A TODOS
- Coat of arms

Styles of Bernardo Álvarez Afonso
- Reference style: His Excellency; The Most Reverend
- Spoken style: Your Excellency
- Religious style: Bishop

Bernardo Álvarez Afonso (29 July 1949 – 25 November 2025) was a Spanish prelate of the Roman Catholic Church who served as bishop of the Diocese of San Cristóbal de La Laguna in Tenerife, commonly known as the Diocese of Tenerife, from 2005 to 2024.

== Biography ==
Bernardo Álvarez Afonso was born on 29 July 1949 in Breña Alta, island of La Palma, in the Province of Santa Cruz de Tenerife. He studied technical architecture and then entered the diocesan seminary. He was ordained a priest on 16 July 1976. In 1994 he earned a licentiate in theology at the Pontifical Gregorian University.

On 29 June 2005, Pope Benedict XVI named him bishop of San Cristóbal de La Laguna. He received his episcopal consecration on 4 September in the Iglesia de la Concepción, the provisional cathedral of the diocese, from Archbishop Manuel Monteiro de Castro, Apostolic Nuncio to Spain. Álvarez was the second native of the Canary Islands to lead the diocese after Bishop Domingo Pérez Cáceres.

In a 2007 interview with local paper La Opinión de Tenerife, he stated: "There are adolescents of thirteen years of age who are minors and are totally in agreement and furthermore desire it. Even if you take care they provoke you." This led to a headline reading "Bishop of Tenerife blames child abuse on the children".

In 2014, the canonization of Blessed José de Anchieta by Pope Francis took place. On 24 April, the Mass of thanksgiving for the canonization presided over by the Pope was celebrated in Rome and attended by Bishop Bernardo Álvarez accompanied by a Canarian representation. José de Anchieta born in Tenerife and missionary in Brazil, became the second Canarian to be canonized by the Catholic Church, after the Peter of Saint Joseph de Betancur in 2002.

On 21 December 2019, Álvarez opened the Holy Door of the Cathedral of San Cristóbal de La Laguna on the occasion of the Jubilee Year for the 200th anniversary of the founding of the diocese.

On 22 September 2021, he offered Mass at the Sanctuary of Nuestra Señora de las Nieves in La Palma, together with the priests of the island, to pray for the end of the volcanic eruption of Cumbre Vieja that began on 19 September.

Pope Francis accepted his resignation on 16 September 2024.

Álvarez died of complications from amyotrophic lateral sclerosis in San Cristóbal de La Laguna, on 25 November 2025, at the age of 76. He was buried on 27 November in the chapel of Our Lady of Candelaria (or the Canary Saints) in the Cathedral of La Laguna.

== Sources ==
- "Quién es Bernardo Álvarez, obispo emérito de Tenerife" (in Spanish). Religion Digital. 16 September 2024.
- "El papa acepta la renuncia por edad del polémico obispo de Tenerife, Bernardo Álvarez" (in Spanish). El Diario. 16 September 2024.
- "Las polémicas del obispo Bernardo Álvarez: de "ser gay es pecado" a saltarse la cola para vacunarse" (in Spanish). El Español. 21 January 2022.

Catholic Church titles
Preceded by Felipe Fernández García	Bishop of San Cristóbal de La Laguna; 2005–2024	Succeeded by Eloy Alberto Santiago
