= Albino González y Menéndez Reigada =

Spanish bishop

The Most Reverend Albino González y Menéndez-Reigada
- Bishop of Roman Catholic Diocese of San Cristóbal de La Laguna and Diocese of Córdoba
- Church: Roman Catholic Church
- See: Roman Catholic Diocese of San Cristóbal de La Laguna or Diocese of Tenerife and Diocese of Córdoba
- In office: 1924-1946
- Predecessor: Gabriel Llompart y Jaume Santandreu
- Successor: Domingo Pérez Cáceres
- Previous post: Priest

Personal details
- Born: 18 January 1881 Corias, Cangas del Tineo, Asturias-Spain
- Died: 13 August 1958 (aged 77) Córdoba, Spain

Albino González y Menéndez-Reigada (Corias, Cangas del Tineo, Asturias, Spain, 18 January 1881 – Córdoba, 13 August 1958) was a Spanish ecclesiastic and the seventh Bishop of the Roman Catholic Diocese of San Cristóbal de La Laguna and later the Bishop of the Diocese of Córdoba.

== Episcopate ==
He was named the bishop of Tenerife on 8 December 1924, by Pope Pius XI.

He was consecrated in Madrid on 19 July 1925. On 10 August 1925 he entered the diocese.

During his pontificate, on 7 June 1941, Cardinal Federico Tedeschini solemnly crowned the Image of the Virgin of Las Nieves, Patron of the Island of La Palma. He expanded the seminary building. He created the Minor seminary in 1944. He ordained 48 diocesan priests. He served the diocese for twenty years until his transfer to the Diocese of Córdoba.

=== Politic attitude ===
Coinciding with Franco when he was assigned to the Canary Islands, after the civil war, in 1939, he wrote the Catecismo patriótico Español, in which he advocates for national Catholicism, qualifies Catalan as a dialect, and promoved the catalan linguistic secessionism:

-It can be said that in Spain only the Castilian language is spoken, because apart from this only Basque is spoken which, as the only language, is only used in some Basque villages and was reduced to dialect functions for its linguistic and philological poverty.

-And what are the main dialects spoken in Spain?

-The main dialects spoken in Spain are four: Catalan, Valencian, Mallorcan and Galician.

This indoctrination manual approved by Franco's Ministry of National Education and with an anti-Semitic and anti-democratic rhetoric, was withdrawn as a textbook in schools from 1945, coinciding with the defeat of the Axis powers.
