= University of La Laguna =

Public university in Tenerife, Spain

- Universidad de La Laguna
- Seal of the University of La Laguna
- Type: Public
- Established: 1927; 99 years ago reorganized in 1989
- Location: San Cristóbal de La Laguna, Canary Islands, Spain
- Website: ull.es

University rankings

Global – Overall
- ARWU World: 701–800 (2023)
- THE World: 1001–1200 (2024)
- USNWR Global: =879 (2023)

The University of La Laguna (ULL; Spanish: Universidad de La Laguna) is a public research university situated in San Cristóbal de La Laguna, on the island of Tenerife, Spain. It is the oldest university in the Canary Islands. The university has six campuses: Central, Anchieta, Guajara, Campus del Sur, Ofra and Santa Cruz de Tenerife.

In 2015, the University of La Laguna entered the ranking of the top 500 universities in the world by Shanghai Ranking, being one of the two Canarian public universities to do so. In addition, the Leiden ranking, prepared by the Center for Studies of Science and Technology of the Leiden University (Netherlands), has ranked the University of La Laguna as the first Spanish university in scientific collaboration. Meanwhile, in 2016, the University of La Laguna was recognized as the second best university in Spain in Humanities, according to a survey by the Everis Foundation.

In the year 2018, the CWUR ranking places the University of La Laguna in the position 446 of the world's universities, and in the number 13 among the Spanish ones. The rankings of faculties such as Physics is in the position 134 of the world, the Faculty of Mathematics is in the interval between the 401 and 500 of the best universities in the world and the Faculty of Medicine among the 200 best in the world according to the Shanghai ranking.

In 2019, the U.S. News & World Report ranking places the University of La Laguna as the first Spanish university in space sciences and the 53rd worldwide of the 250 universities analyzed.

The University of La Laguna has 13 University Research Institutes. The University Research Institutes are centers of relevance and activity dedicated to scientific, technical and artistic research. The Canarian Astrophysics Institute and the University Institute of Tropical Diseases and Public Health of the Canary Islands are internationally renowned.

== History ==
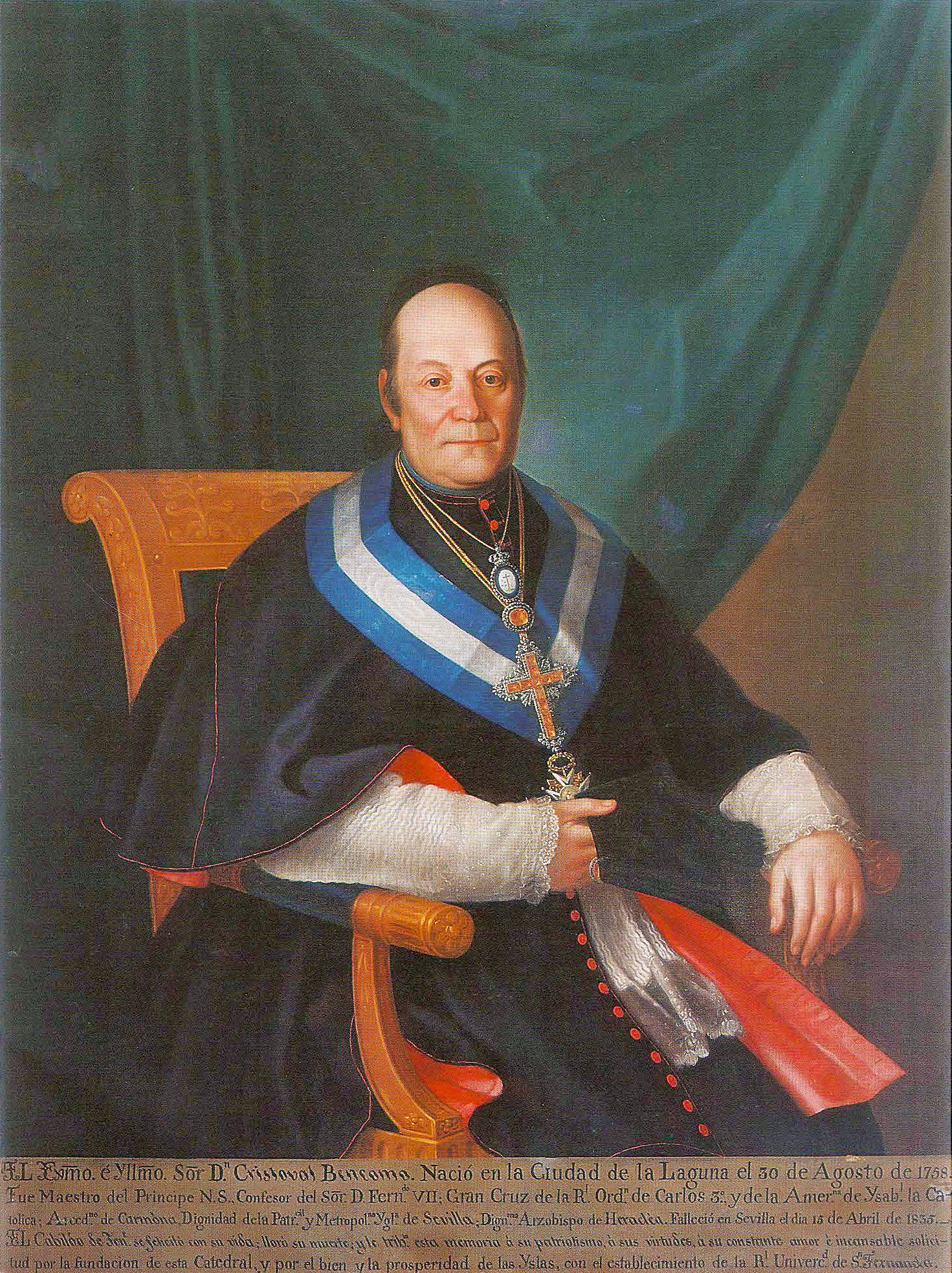
Don Cristóbal Bencomo y Rodríguez. Confessor of King Ferdinand VII of Spain and Titular Archbishop of Heraclea. He was the great promoter of the creation of the Literary University of San Fernando (forerunner of the University of La Laguna) and the Diocese of San Cristobal de La Laguna.

Its origins date to the year 1701 when a center for advanced studies was established by the Augustinians in the town of La Laguna. A papal bull of 1744 proposed that it be converted into the Ecclesiastical University of San Agustín.

In 1792, by royal decree, Charles IV of Spain ordered the establishment in San Cristóbal de La Laguna, then the capital of Tenerife and Canary Islands, of the first Universidad Literaria of the Canaries, but the political situation on the mainland prevented its establishment. However, with the restoration of the House of Bourbon in the guise of Fernando VII of Spain, the university was established at La Laguna as the Universidad de San Fernando. In this role it played an important role the priest Cristóbal Bencomo y Rodríguez, confessor of King Ferdinand VII and Titular Archbishop of Heraclea.

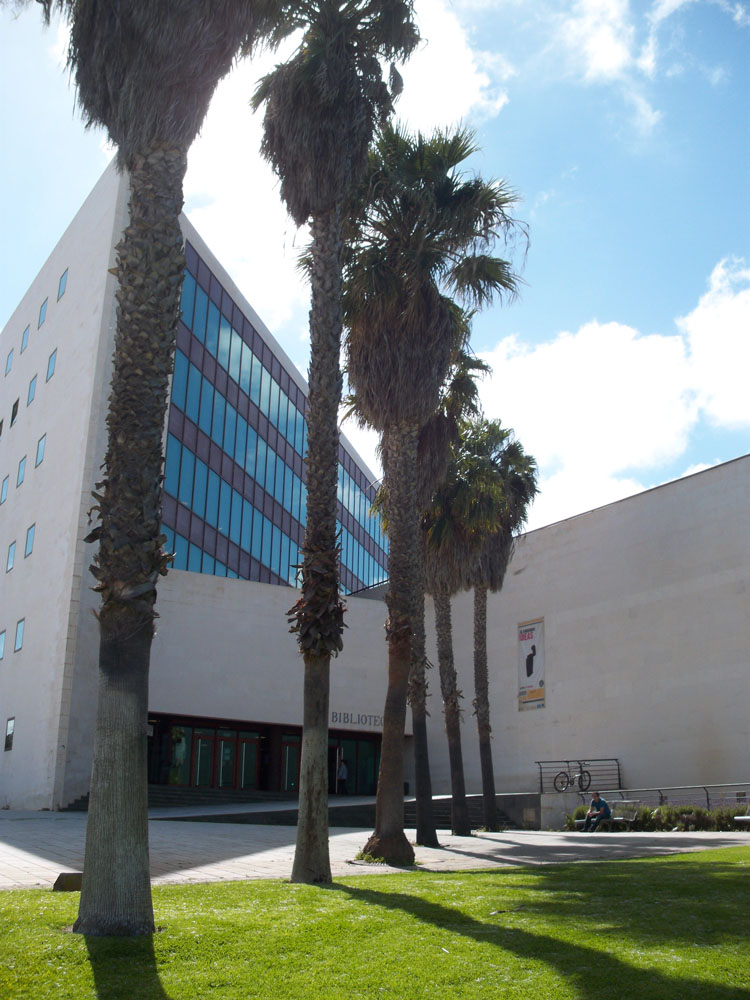
Guajara Campus, University of La Laguna

The university, with its current name, was created with the same decree that divided the Canary Islands into two provinces in 1927, and reorganized in 1989, which led to the creation of the University of Las Palmas de Gran Canaria.

== Units ==
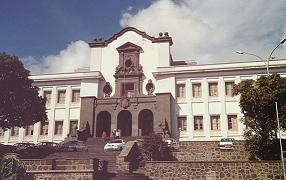
Faculty of Education, University of La Laguna

Split their units in the cities of San Cristóbal de La Laguna and Santa Cruz de Tenerife. Moreover, its activity includes university curricula such as the university's environmental La Palma, the Summer University of Lanzarote, the Summer University of La Gomera, the Summer University of Adeje (Tenerife), Classrooms El Hierro Sea, and university extension courses, in some municipalities of Tenerife and other islands.

== Traditions ==
One of the most popular student traditions at La Laguna University is the popular Fuga de San Diego every November 13. Although born in the IES Canarias Cabrera Pinto of the city, it has a great following among the students of the University of La Laguna, as well as in the other educational centers of the Canary archipelago. The tradition has its origin in 1919, when university professor Diego Jiménez de Cisneros insisted students have an exam that day as a way to celebrate his Name day. This prevented the students from participating in the romería of St. Didacus of Alcalá. However, the students did not attend class in favour of the romería, and it later became an annual tradition.

This tradition consists, therefore, in the non-attendance of students to class that day. Nowadays this tradition is celebrated at schools, universities and secondary institutes all around the Canary Islands.

== Notable people ==
- María Rosa Alonso (1909–2011), Spanish professor, philologist, essayist
- María José Guerra Palmero (born 1962), Spanish philosopher and professor
- Carolina Mallol (born 1973), archaeological scientist
- Enrique Meléndez-Hevia (born 1946). Biochemist known for research on evolution and metabolism.
- Irene González Hernández (1969-2014), researcher and astrophysicist,

== See also ==
- University of Las Palmas de Gran Canaria
- List of early modern universities in Europe
