= Opinion (disambiguation) =

An opinion is a subjective belief, and is the result of emotion or interpretation of facts.

Opinion may also refer to:

- Legal opinion, a written explanation by judges that accompanies an order or ruling in a case
- Judicial opinion
- Opinion journalism
- Opinion piece, an article, published in a newspaper or magazine, that mainly reflects the author's opinion about the subject
- "Opinion" (song), 2004 song by Kurt Cobain
- I'm entitled to my opinion

== See also ==
- La Opinión (disambiguation)
- Opinions (TV series), a British television series
