= Ramón Torrijos y Gómez =

Spanish ecclesiastic

The Most Reverend Ramón Torrijos y Gómez
- Bishop of Roman Catholic Diocese of San Cristóbal de La Laguna and Roman Catholic Archdiocese of Mérida-Badajoz
- Church: Roman Catholic Church
- See: Roman Catholic Diocese of San Cristóbal de La Laguna or Diocese of Tenerife and Roman Catholic Archdiocese of Mérida-Badajoz
- In office: 1887-1894
- Predecessor: Jacinto María Cervera y Cervera
- Successor: Nicolás Rey y Redondo
- Previous post: Priest

Personal details
- Born: September 1, 1841 Cardenete, Cuenca-Spain
- Died: January 16, 1903 (aged 61) Badajoz, Spain

Ramón Torrijos y Gómez (September 1, 1841 – January 16, 1903) was a Spanish ecclesiastic, fourth Bishop of the Roman Catholic Diocese of San Cristóbal de La Laguna and subsequently Bishop of the Roman Catholic Archdiocese of Mérida-Badajoz.

== Episcopate ==
He was later appointed by Pope Leo XIII as Bishop of the Diocese of Tenerife on November 25, 1887. He took possession of the diocese on December 8, 1888 in the Cathedral of La Laguna. During his pontificate he made the canonical Coronation of the Virgin of Candelaria (patron saint of the Canary Islands), on October 13, 1889, being the fifth Marian image of Spain to be crowned.

He also acquired the Salazar Palace of San Cristóbal de La Laguna as the seat and residence of the bishops of this diocese. In total he ordered 31 diocesan priests. On September 10, 1894, he was transferred to Badajoz, where he died in 1903.
