= Eloy Alberto Santiago =

Spanish Catholic bishop

The Most Reverend Eloy Alberto Santiago
- Bishop of San Cristóbal de La Laguna
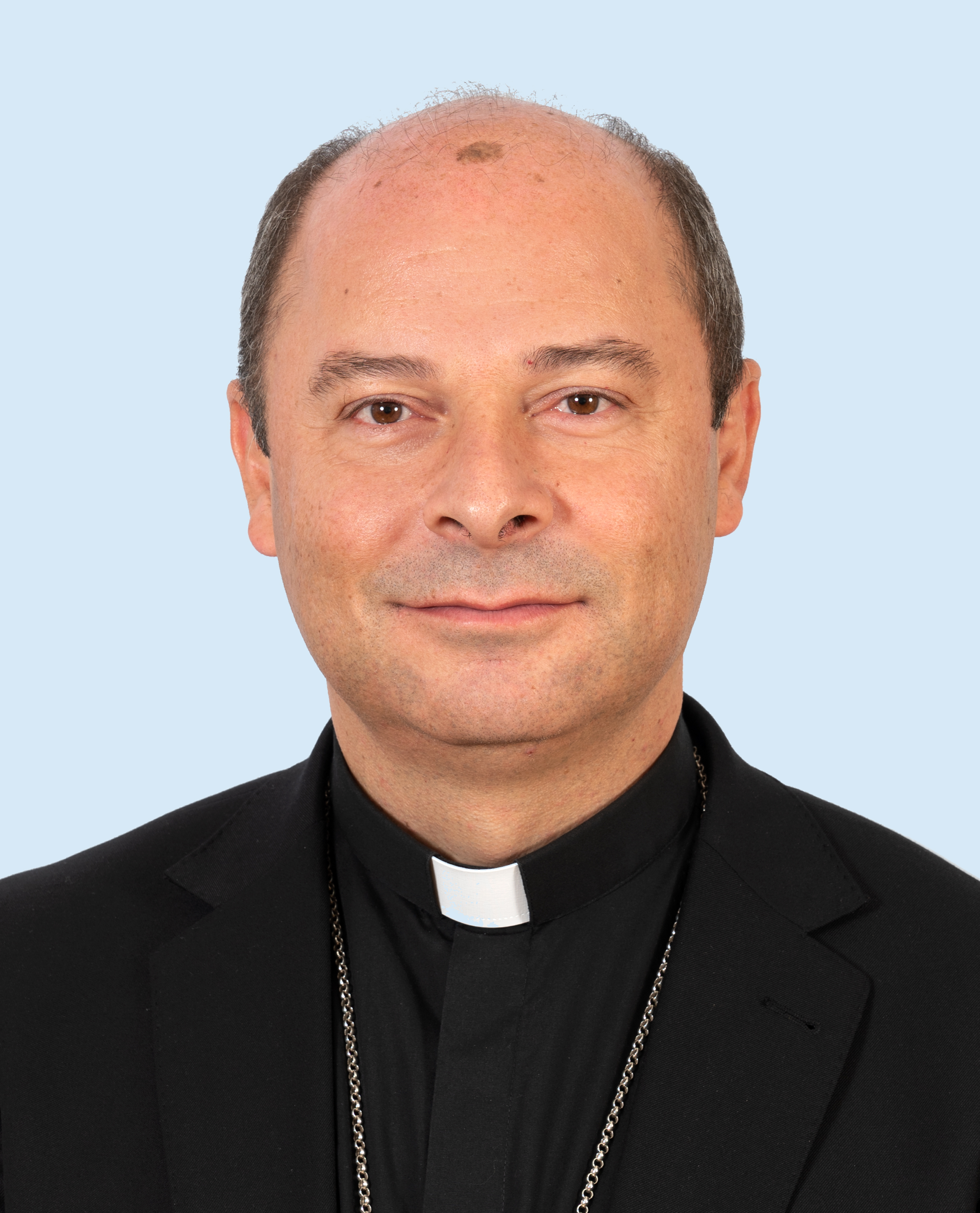
- Church: Catholic Church
- See: San Cristóbal de La Laguna
- Appointed: 24 February 2025
- Predecessor: Bernardo Álvarez Afonso

Orders
- Ordination: 17 July 1999
- Consecration: 1 May 2025

Personal details
- Born: 8 September 1973 (age 52) Las Palmas, Spain
- Motto: Ut ministraret
- Coat of arms

Eloy Alberto Santiago Santiago (born 8 September 1973) is a Spanish Catholic prelate who has served as Bishop of San Cristóbal de La Laguna, commonly known as the Diocese of Tenerife, since 2025.

== Early life and education ==
Santiago was born in Las Palmas on 8 September 1973. He entered the diocesan seminary of the Canary Islands (1992), and completed his baccalaureate in Theology at the Comillas Pontifical University. After being ordained a priest on July 17, 1999, he was incardinated in the diocese of the Canary Islands. He continued his academic training at the Pontifical Gregorian University, where he graduated in Dogmatic Theology, obtaining a doctorate from said university (January 2024). He had previously entered the diplomatic service at the Pontifical Ecclesiastical Academy (2003), combining these studies with a degree in Canon Law at the Pontifical Gregorian University.

== Ministry ==
Between 2006 and 2014, Santiago worked as secretary of the apostolic nunciatures in Colombia (2006-2009), South Africa (2009-2013) and Great Britain (2013-2014). Upon returning to the Canary Islands, he resumed his pastoral work in various parishes of the Canarian diocese: Santa Brígida and Nuestra Señora del Madroñal (2013-2014); San Pedro in La Puntilla (2014-2019), San Pío X and El Salvador (2018-2019); Santísima Trinidad in El Tablero and Rector of the Ecumenical Temple El Salvador (2019-2022); Ascension of the Lord, the Assumption of Mary and Jesus of Nazareth, in Las Palmas de Gran Canaria (January 2022-February 2025).

== Bishop ==
On 24 February 2025, Santiago was appointed by Pope Francis as bishop of the diocese of San Cristóbal de La Laguna. His inauguration as Bishop of San Cristóbal de La Laguna took place on 1 May in the cathedral of La Laguna. Eloy Santiago thus becomes the third Canarian to govern the Nivariense diocese, following Domingo Pérez Cáceres (1947-1961) and Bernardo Álvarez Afonso (2005-2024).

He was consecrated by the Apostolic Nuncio to the European Union, Monsignor Bernardito Auza. He took canonical possession on the same day as his ordination in a grand religious ceremony attended by more than 1,200 people inside the cathedral, as well as two nuncios from Spain and Portugal respectively, 14 bishops, and more than 250 priests. The ceremony was initially to be presided over by Lithuanian Cardinal Rolandas Makrickas, coadjutor archpriest of the Basilica of Santa Maria Maggiore in Rome, although the death of Pope Francis made it impossible for him to attend.

He celebrated his first Eucharist as bishop the day after his episcopal ordination in the Basilica of Our Lady of Candelaria, the shrine of the patron saint of the Canary Islands.

On June 12, 2026, Bishop Santiago received Pope Leo XIV in his diocese during his visit to Tenerife as part of his apostolic journey to Spain. It was the first and only papal visit to the Canary archipelago.
