= María de San Antonio Lorenzo y Fuentes =

Dominican religious sister and Spanish mystic

Personal life
- Born: María de Lorenzo y Fuentes; August 5, 1665 Garachico, Tenerife
- Died: May 10, 1741 (aged 75) Puerto de la Cruz, Tenerife
- Other name: Sor María de San Antonino
- Occupation: nun and mystic

Religious life
- Religion: Christianity

María de San Antonio Lorenzo y Fuentes or Sor María de San Antonino (August 5, 1665 in Garachico, Tenerife – May 10, 1741 in Puerto de la Cruz, Tenerife) was a Dominican religious sister and Spanish mystic.

== Biography ==
Her life was written of by Francisco Martínez Puentes, the priest of her native town, Garachico, a city in the north of the island of Tenerife.

María de San Antonio came from a wealthy family, professed as a Dominican nun in the Convento de Nuestra Señora de las Nieves of the city of Puerto de la Cruz (the convent disappeared by fire in 1925). This convent temple was in front of the Parroquia de Nuestra Señora de la Peña de Francia.

The nun was given various gifts such as the reading of souls. According to popular tradition, de San Antonio was able to read the mind of a convent servant, named Felipa, who prayed that God would lead her to purgatory after her death. The nun rebuked her, urging her to ask God to go to heaven instead of purgatory. Another miracle attributed to the nun happened when a mason who worked in the convent fell into the void, rushing to the ground gently and swaying, without dying or suffering damage, since the workman had entrusted to the nun.

María de San Antonino died on May 10, 1741. According to the files, her body remained incorrupt and kept her blood fresh. The acts of exhumation and translation of her remains were verified when Luis Antonio Folgueras y Sión was bishop of the Diocese of Tenerife. Her body is not currently preserved, as it disappeared in the convent fire in 1925.

== See also ==
- List of saints of the Canary Islands
