= Damián Iguacén Borau =

Spanish Catholic bishop (1916–2020)

The Most Reverend Damián Iguacén Borau
- Bishop Emeritus of San Cristóbal de La Laguna
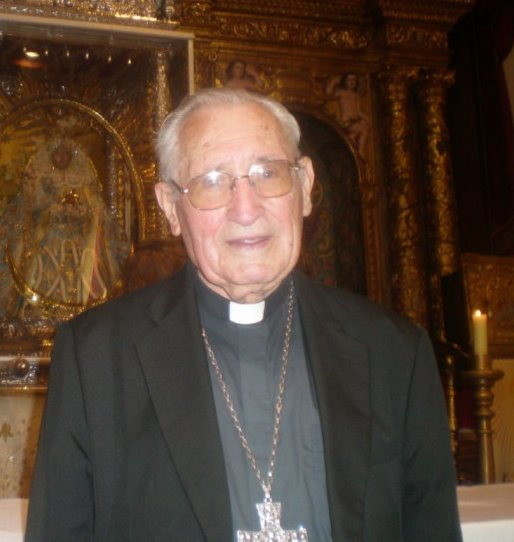
- Church: Roman Catholic Church
- Diocese: San Cristóbal de La Laguna
- See: San Cristóbal de La Laguna
- Appointed: 14 August 1984
- Term ended: 12 June 1991
- Predecessor: Luis Franco Cascón
- Successor: Felipe Fernández García
- Previous posts: Bishop of Barbastro (1970–74); Bishop of Teruel (1970–84); Apostolic Administrator of Albarracin (1974–84)

Orders
- Ordination: 7 June 1941 by Lino Rodrigo Ruesca
- Consecration: 11 October 1970 by Luigi Dadaglio

Personal details
- Born: Damián Iguacén Borau; 12 February 1916 Fuencalderas, Aragón, Spain
- Died: 24 November 2020 (aged 104) Huesca, Spain
- Motto: El ultimo de todos y el servidor de todos

Damián Iguacén Borau (12 February 1916 – 24 November 2020) was a Spanish bishop of the Roman Catholic Church.

== Life ==
Iguacén Borau was born in Fuencalderas, Spain and ordained a priest on 7 June 1941. He was consecrated bishop of the Barbastro Diocese on 11 October 1970. Subsequently, he was transferred to the Diocese of Teruel and Albarracín on 23 September 1974 and then to the tenth bishop of the Roman Catholic Diocese of San Cristóbal de La Laguna on 14 August 1984 where he remained until his retirement on 12 June 1991.

He turned 100 in February 2016. At the age of 104 years, he was the oldest living Catholic bishop until his death. Iguacén Borau died on 24 November 2020, in Huesca, Spain at the age of 104.

== Publications ==
- Una visita a la catacumba zaragozana, Impr. Folios 1954
- Preces Laurentinas, 1964
- La Basílica de S. Lorenze de Huesca, 1969
- La Diócesis de Barbastro, Imp.Tipo-Linea, Zaragoza 1971, Depósito Legal Z-442-71
- San Ramón del Monte, Obispo de Barbastro, Talleres Editoriales "El Noticiero", Zaragoza 1972, Depósito Legal Z-4-72
- El patrimonio cultural de la Iglesia en España, La Editorial Católica 1982, ISBN 978-84-220-1076-0
- La Iglesia y Su Patrimonio Cultural, Edice Madrid 1984, ISBN 978-84-7141-144-0
- La ruta "Virgen de Candelaria": tradición, mensaje, compromiso : exhortación pastoral, Obispado de Tenerife 1990
- Diccionario del patrimonio cultural de la iglesia, Encuentro Ediciones Madrid 1991, ISBN 978-84-7490-272-3
- El arte en la liturgia (Band 47 von Cuadernos Phase), Centre de Pastoral Litúrgica 1993, ISBN 978-84-7467-271-8
- Diálogos con Santa María, madre de Dios, Producciones Gráficas 1994, ISBN 978-84-605-2003-0
- El Venerable Francisco Ferrer y los Operarios Misionistas: un grano de trigo caído en tierra, D. Iguacén 1997, ISBN 978-84-605-5938-2
- Incondicionalidad (Band 105 von Vida y misión), Edibesa 2004, ISBN 978-84-8407-470-0

== See also ==
- Diocese of Tenerife
- Diocese of Teruel and Albarracín
- Barbastro Diocese
