= Gabriel Llompart y Jaume Santandreu =

Spanish ecclesiastic

The Most Reverend Gabriel Llompart y Jaume Santandreu
- Bishop of Roman Catholic Diocese of San Cristóbal de La Laguna, Girona and Mallorca
- Church: Roman Catholic Church
- See: Roman Catholic Diocese of San Cristóbal de La Laguna or Diocese of Tenerife, Girona and Mallorca
- In office: 1918-1922
- Predecessor: Nicolás Rey y Redondo
- Successor: Albino González y Menéndez Reigada
- Previous post: Priest

Personal details
- Born: 1862 Inca, Mallorca, Spain
- Died: 1928 (aged 65–66) Palma de Mallorca, Spain

Gabriel Llompart y Jaume Santandreu (Inca, Mallorca, 1862 - Palma de Mallorca, 1928) was a Spanish ecclesiastic, sixth Bishop of the Roman Catholic Diocese of San Cristóbal de La Laguna and subsequently Diocese of Girona and Diocese of Mallorca.

== Biography ==
Was ordained as a priest on December 13, 1886 and holds and obtained a doctorate in Theology and Canon Law. He was canon of the cathedral of Majorca. Pope Benedict XV appointed him bishop of Tenerife on May 17, 1918, where he remained until December 1922.

In 1919, Gabriel Llompart presided over the celebrations on the occasion of the first centenary of the creation of the Diocese of Tenerife. But his most transcendental and remembered fact in this diocese was that through his intercession the Dominican Order could be reinstated in the Candelaria after being expelled during the Confiscation of Mendizabal. On July 9, 1922, the Dominicans again took possession of the Royal Convent and Sanctuary of Our Lady of Candelaria (patron saint of the Canary Islands), and resumed restoration works paralyzed from almost a century before.

The 27 of June 1922 was designated bishop of Gerona.

Llompart died in Palma de Mallorca 9 of December 1928, at the age of 66 years. He was buried in the Palma Cathedral.
