= La Opinión (set index) =

La Opinión (Spanish: "The Opinion") is frequently used as a newspaper name in the Spanish-speaking world and in other countries. A partial list includes:

== Argentina ==
- La Opinión (Argentina), Buenos Aires, Argentina, edited by Jacobo Timerman (1971 to 1977)
- La Opinion Austral, Río Gallegos, Santa Cruz, Argentina

== Colombia ==
- La Opinión (Cúcuta), Cúcuta, Norte de Santander

== Mexico ==
- La Opinión (Poza Rica), Poza Rica, Veracruz
- La Opinión (Puebla), Puebla

== Puerto Rico ==
- La Opinión (Cayey), Cayey
- La Opinión del Sur, Ponce

== Spain ==
- La Opinión A Coruña, A Coruña
- La Opinión de Almeria, Almería
- La Opinión de Málaga, Málaga
- La Opinión de Murcia, Murcia
- La Opinión de Tenerife, Santa Cruz de Tenerife
- La Opinión - El Correo de Zamora, Zamora

== United States ==
- La Opinión, Los Angeles

== See also ==
- Opinión, Cochabamba, Bolivia
