= Ildefonso Joaquín Infante y Macías =

Spanish ecclesiastic

The Most Reverend Ildefonso Joaquín Infante y Macías
- Bishop of Roman Catholic Diocese of San Cristóbal de La Laguna and apostolic administrator of Ceuta.
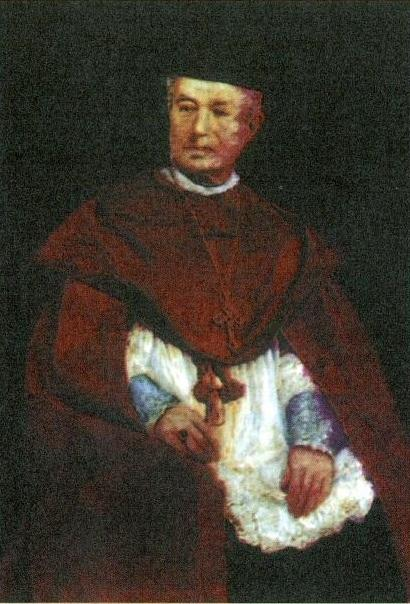
- Church: Roman Catholic Church
- See: Roman Catholic Diocese of San Cristóbal de La Laguna and apostolic administrator of Ceuta.
- In office: 1877-1882
- Predecessor: Luis Antonio Folgueras y Sión
- Successor: Jacinto María Cervera y Cervera
- Previous post: Priest

Personal details
- Born: 31 May 1813 Moguer, Huelva-Spain
- Died: 2 July 1888 (aged 75) Moguer, Huelva, Spain

Ildefonso Joaquín Infante y Macías (Moguer, Huelva, 31 May 1813 - Moguer, Huelva, 2 July 1888) was a Spanish ecclesiastic, second Bishop of the Roman Catholic Diocese of San Cristóbal de La Laguna.

== Episcopate ==
On 18 June 1876 he was consecrated bishop in the diocese of Cadiz, a position he held in Ceuta until 20 May 1877 that happened to be of the Diocese of San Cristóbal de La Laguna or Tenerife. There he excelled in his position, establishing free schools for poor children, missions to evangelize the peoples, and moral and liturgical conferences to stimulate the clergy.

He retired from the position of bishop of Tenerife in January 1882.

He died on 2 July 1888 in Moguer, and was buried in the Hermitage of Our Lady of Montemayor.
