= Felipe Fernández García =

Spanish bishop

The Most Reverend Felipe Fernández García
- Bishop of Roman Catholic Diocese of San Cristóbal de La Laguna and Ávila
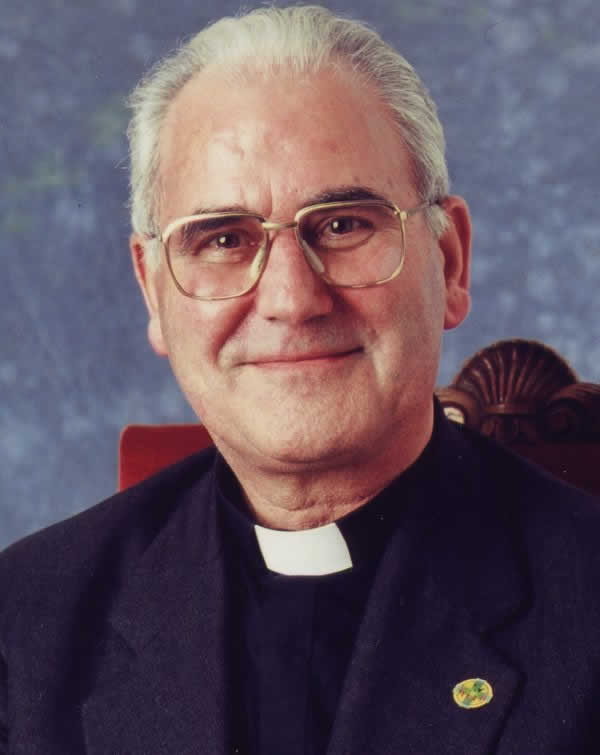
- Church: Roman Catholic Church
- See: Roman Catholic Diocese of San Cristóbal de La Laguna or Diocese of Tenerife and Roman Catholic Diocese of Ávila
- In office: 1991-2005
- Predecessor: Damián Iguacén Borau
- Successor: Bernardo Álvarez Afonso
- Previous post: Priest

Personal details
- Born: 30 August 1935 Plasencia-Spain
- Died: 6 April 2012 (aged 76) San Cristóbal de La Laguna, Tenerife, Spain

Felipe Fernández García (30 August 1935 – 6 April 2012) was the Roman Catholic eleventh bishop of the Roman Catholic Diocese of San Cristóbal de La Laguna and bishop Ávila, Spain. It was the eleventh bishop of San Cristóbal de La Laguna.

Ordained to the priesthood in 1957, Garcia became bishop in 1976 and retired in 2006.

== Biography ==
He was ordained priest in Plasencia on 28 July 1957. He received episcopal consecration on 28 November 1976 at the Cathedral of Avila, taking possession of the diocese for which he had been appointed by Paul VI.

On 12 June 1991 Pope John Paul II appointed him Roman Catholic Diocese of San Cristóbal de La Laguna, also called Diocese of Tenerife. On 24 July 1991, to take possession, making his entry into the diocese on 11 August 1991. Among his pontificate activities, mainly highlights the convening and holding of the first Diocesan Synod Nivariense. For this reason his name will be linked to the history of the diocese.

It also instituted in 2001, the septenary transfers (every seven years) of the image of the Virgin of Candelaria (patron saint of the Canary Islands) to the cities of Santa Cruz de Tenerife (capital of the island of Tenerife) and San Cristóbal de La Laguna (capital of the diocese), beginning with the transfer of the Virgin to Santa Cruz in 2002 and continuing with the transfer to La Laguna in 2009 and so on and so on every seven years between both cities.

During his pontificate in Tenerife, on 30 July 2002, the canonization in Guatemala of Peter of Saint Joseph de Betancur took place, who became the first canary to be canonized by the Catholic Church. Felipe Fernández attended this canonization along with a large Canarian representation. The ceremony was presided over by Pope John Paul II.

On 29 June 2005 he was appointed apostolic administrator of the diocese to be accepted his resignation for health reasons, which was submitted in September 2004, because she had Parkinson's disease, stopping on 4 September 2005 to take over the new bishop, becoming emeritus bishop of the Diocese of Tenerife. In his pontificate he ordered 68 diocesan priests, 5 religious and 2 permanent deacons.

He died on 6 April 2012 at 76 years old, as a result of severe respiratory problems. After being veiled her body in the Episcopal Palace and the Church of the Conception of San Cristóbal de La Laguna was buried in the church itself on 10 April 2012.
