= Jacinto María Cervera y Cervera =

Spanish ecclesiastic

The Most Reverend Jacinto María Cervera y Cervera
- Bishop of Roman Catholic Diocese of San Cristóbal de La Laguna and Diocese of Mallorca
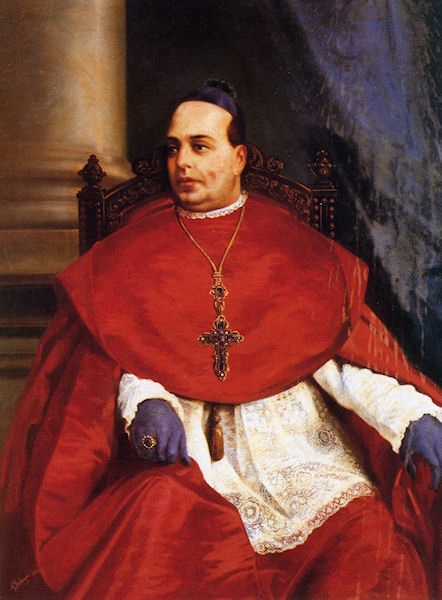
- Church: Roman Catholic Church
- See: Roman Catholic Diocese of San Cristóbal de La Laguna or Diocese of Tenerife and Diocese of Mallorca
- In office: 1882-1885
- Predecessor: Ildefonso Joaquín Infante y Macías
- Successor: Ramón Torrijos y Gómez
- Previous post: Priest

Personal details
- Born: 12 October 1827 Pedralba-Spain
- Died: 14 November 1897 (aged 70) Mallorca, Spain

Jacinto María Cervera y Cervera (Pedralba, 12 October 1827 - Mallorca, 14 November 1897) was a Spanish ecclesiastic, third Bishop of the Roman Catholic Diocese of San Cristóbal de La Laguna and subsequently Bishop of the Diocese of Mallorca.

== Biography ==
Born in Pedralba in the Valencian Community on 12 October 1827, he was ordained a priest in 1850.

He was appointed auxiliary bishop of Zaragoza on 16 December 1880, with the titular seat of Hypsus. He was consecrated a bishop on 6 February 1881. The following year, on 27 March 1882, he was appointed bishop of San Cristóbal de La Laguna (or Tenerife). He entered the diocese on 16 July 1882 and officiated as Pontifical in the Cathedral of San Cristóbal de La Laguna. He was the third bishop of Tenerife. He ordained five diocesan priests and years later presented the resignation that was accepted on 21 July 1885 and retired to the Balearic Islands.

Finally, the year of retiring was designated 10 June 1886 like bishop of Mallorca and Ibiza, position that occupied until his death on 14 November 1897, at the age of 70 years.
