= María José Guerra Palmero =

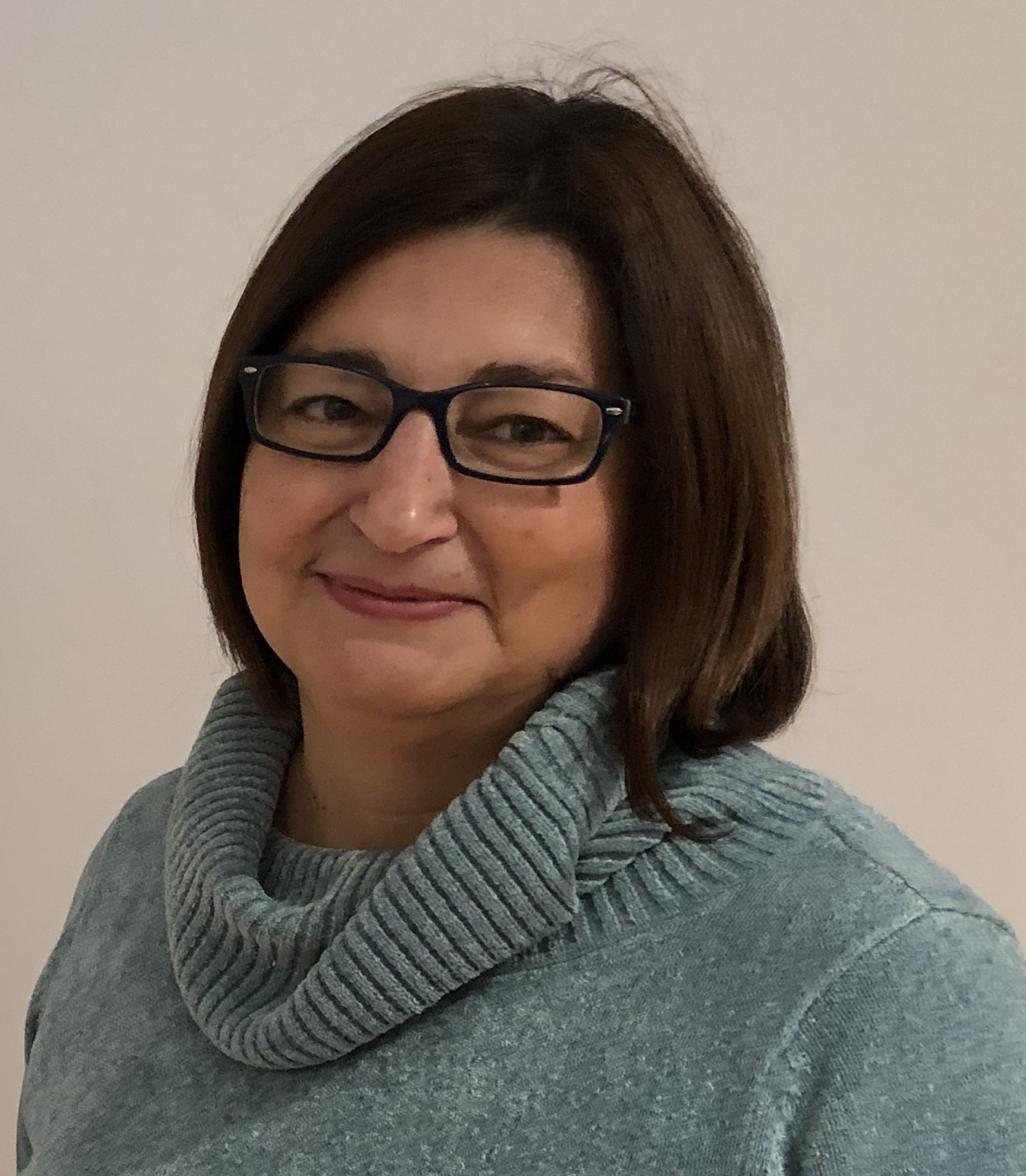
- (2019)
- Born: 28 November 1962 (age 63); San Cristóbal de La Laguna, Canary Islands, Spain
- Occupations: Philosopher; professor; writer; feminist theorist

Education
- Education: University of La Laguna
- Thesis: Identidad moral e intersubjetividad. Habermas y la crítica feminista (1996)
- Doctoral advisor: Gabriel Bello Reguera

María José Guerra Palmero (born 28 November 1962) is a Spanish philosopher, writer, and feminist theorist. She holds a Ph.D. in Philosophy and is a professor in the area of moral philosophy at the Faculty of Humanities of the University of La Laguna (ULL) in the Canary Islands. Since 2017, she has been president of the Red española de Filosofía (Spanish Philosophy Network). From July 2019 until May 25, 2020, she served as Minister of Education, Universities, Culture and Sports of the Gobierno de Canarias under Ángel Víctor Torres.

== Education ==
Guerra did her undergraduate studies at ULL (1980–84), graduating with a degree in Philosophy and Education Sciences. In 1985, she sat the competitive examination for the post of Associate Professor of Spanish Baccalaureate and worked in different secondary schools until 1992. In 1991, she presented her undergraduate thesis with the title Postmodernidad y sujeto: el caso Vattimo (Postmodernity and subject: the Vattimo case). In 1996, she read her doctoral thesis on Identidad moral e intersubjetividad. Habermas y la crítica feminista (Moral identity and intersubjectivity, Habermas and feminist critique), under the direction of Gabriel Bello Reguera, which was unanimously qualified as apto cum laude.

During her postdoctoral training, she made two research stays in the United States, the first, invited by Professor Nancy Fraser, at The New School for Social Research, with The New School, New York City, in the fall of 1997, and the second, at the Center for European Studies, Harvard University, in the fall of 1998, invited by Professor Seyla Benhabib. After obtaining the Salvador de Madariaga researcher mobility grant, she studied at the Institute for Environment, Philosophy and Public Policy at Lancaster University from September 2005 to March 2006.

== Career and research ==
Guerra is a professor of the Master's Degree in Gender and Equality Policies at ULL. Previously, she directed two editions of the Master in Feminist Studies, Equality Policies, and Gender Violence at ULL (2005-2007) and (2007-2009). She was the Director of the Instituto Universitario de Estudios de las Mujeres (University Institute of Women's Studies) at ULL from 2010 to 2012.

Guerra participates in the Interdisciplinary Gender Studies Ph.D. program coordinated by the Autonomous University of Madrid (UAM) in which gender research groups from nine Spanish universities collaborate. She is also the ULL Coordinator of the Interuniversity Doctorate in Philosophy coordinated by the University of Murcia and in which six universities participate. She is the Principal Investigator of the R&D Project FFI2011-24120, entitled Justicia, Ciudadanía y Género. Feminización de las Migraciones y Derechos Humanos (Justice, Citizenship and Gender. Feminization of Migrations and Human Rights) in which Spanish, American and Mexican researchers participate. Since 2008, she has been the director of the journal Cuadernos del Ateneo, a cultural journal of the Ateneo de la Laguna. She is also a member of the editorial boards of the journals Clepsydra. Revista de estudios del género y teoría feminista and of Laguna, revista de Filosofía, as well as being a member of the advisory board of several philosophy journals. Her research interests include contemporary ethical and political theory, philosophical feminisms, and applied ethics, especially bioethics, migration ethics, and ecological ethics. She has been a member of the Research Ethics Committee of the ULL since 2011. She directs the Center for Ecosocial Studies at the ULL and since 2015, she has been president of the Spanish Philosophy Network.

Guerra began her term as Minister of Education in the Canary Islands in July 2019 in the government of Ángel Víctor Torres. In May 2020, she resigned from this position after not reaching agreements with the different educational groups regarding the start of classes after they were stopped due to the coronavirus pandemic.

== Selected works ==
- 2015: Jürgen Habermas. La apuesta por la democracia
- 2009: María José Guerra and Liliana del Basto, Espacio Público y Perspectiva de Género: en diálogo con el joven Habermas. Universidad del Tolima, Colombia
- 2004: Intervenciones feministas. Derechos, mujeres y sociedad. Idea Press, Sta. Cruz de Tenerife
- 2001: Breve introducción a la ética ecológica. Antonio Machado Libros, Madrid
- 2001: Teoría feminista contemporánea. Una aproximación desde la ética. Editorial Complutense, Madrid
- 1998: Mujer, identidad y reconocimiento. Habermas y la crítica feminista. Instituto Canario de la Mujer, Sta. Cruz de Tenerife

=== As editor ===
- 2014: María José Guerra and Aránzazu Hernández Piñero (eds.) Éticas y políticas de la alteridad. Plaza y Valdés, Madrid
- 2007: María José Guerra and Roberto R. Aramayo (eds.) Los laberintos de la responsabilidad. Plaza y Valdés, Madrid
- 2006: María José Guerra and Ana Hardisson (eds.) 20 Pensadoras del siglo XX Nobel, Oviedo
- 2002: María José Guerra and Concepción Ortega (eds.) Globalización y neoliberalismo: ¿un futuro inevitable? Nobel, Oviedo
- 1999: María José Guerra and Mª Eugenia Monzón (eds.) Mujeres, espacio y tiempo, Instituto Canario de la Mujer, Sta. Cruz de Tenerife
