= Pedralba =

- Municipality
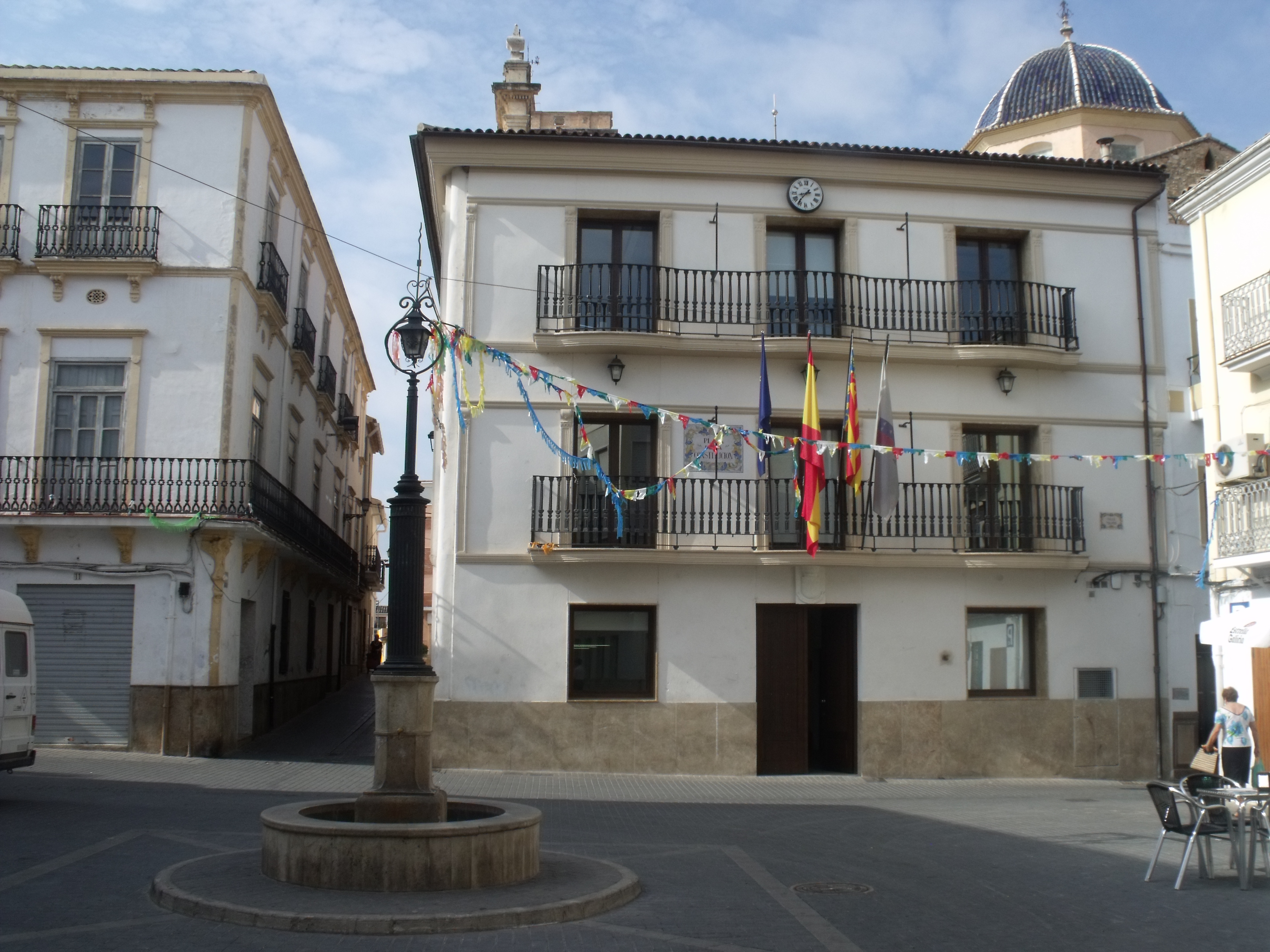
- Town hall

- Coat of arms

- Location in Spain
- Coordinates: 39°36′20″N 0°43′34″W
- Country: Spain
- Autonomous community: Valencian Community
- Province: Valencia
- Comarca: Los Serranos
- Judicial district: Llíria

Government
  - Alcalde: Roberto Serigó Andrés

Area
  - Total: 58.9 km^{2} (22.7 sq mi)
- Elevation: 120 m (390 ft)

Population (2025-01-01)
  - Total: 3,225
  - Density: 54.8/km^{2} (142/sq mi)
- Demonym: Pedralbino/a
- Time zone: UTC+1 (CET)
  - Summer (DST): UTC+2 (CEST)
- Postal code: 46164
- Official language(s): Spanish
- Website: Official website

Pedralba is a municipality in the comarca of Los Serranos in the Valencian Community, Spain.

The Anarchist Antonio Ortiz Ramírez's parents were emigrants from Pedralba.

Municipalities of Serranos

| Official name | Name in Spanish | Name in co-official language (Valencian) | Population (2023) | Area (km^{2}) | Density (2023) | Province | Comarca | INE code |
|---|---|---|---|---|---|---|---|---|
| Pedralba | Pedralba | | 3,048 | 58.85 | 51.79 | Valencia / València | Serranos | 46191 |

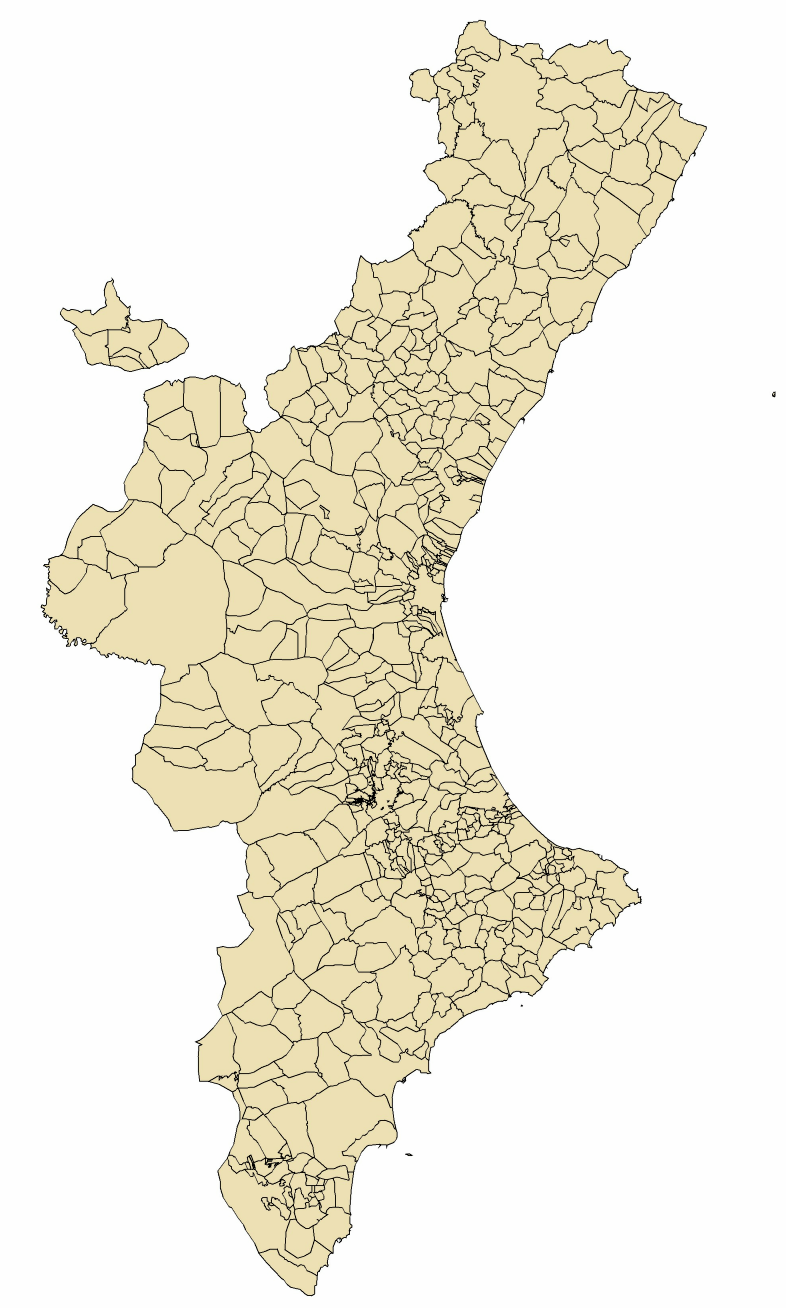
Municipalities of the Valencian Community

== Births ==
- Jacinto María Cervera y Cervera, Bishop of San Cristóbal de La Laguna

== See also ==
- List of municipalities in Valencia
