= Luis Franco Cascón =

Spanish ecclesiastic

The Most Reverend Luis Franco Cascón
- Bishop of Roman Catholic Diocese of San Cristóbal de La Laguna
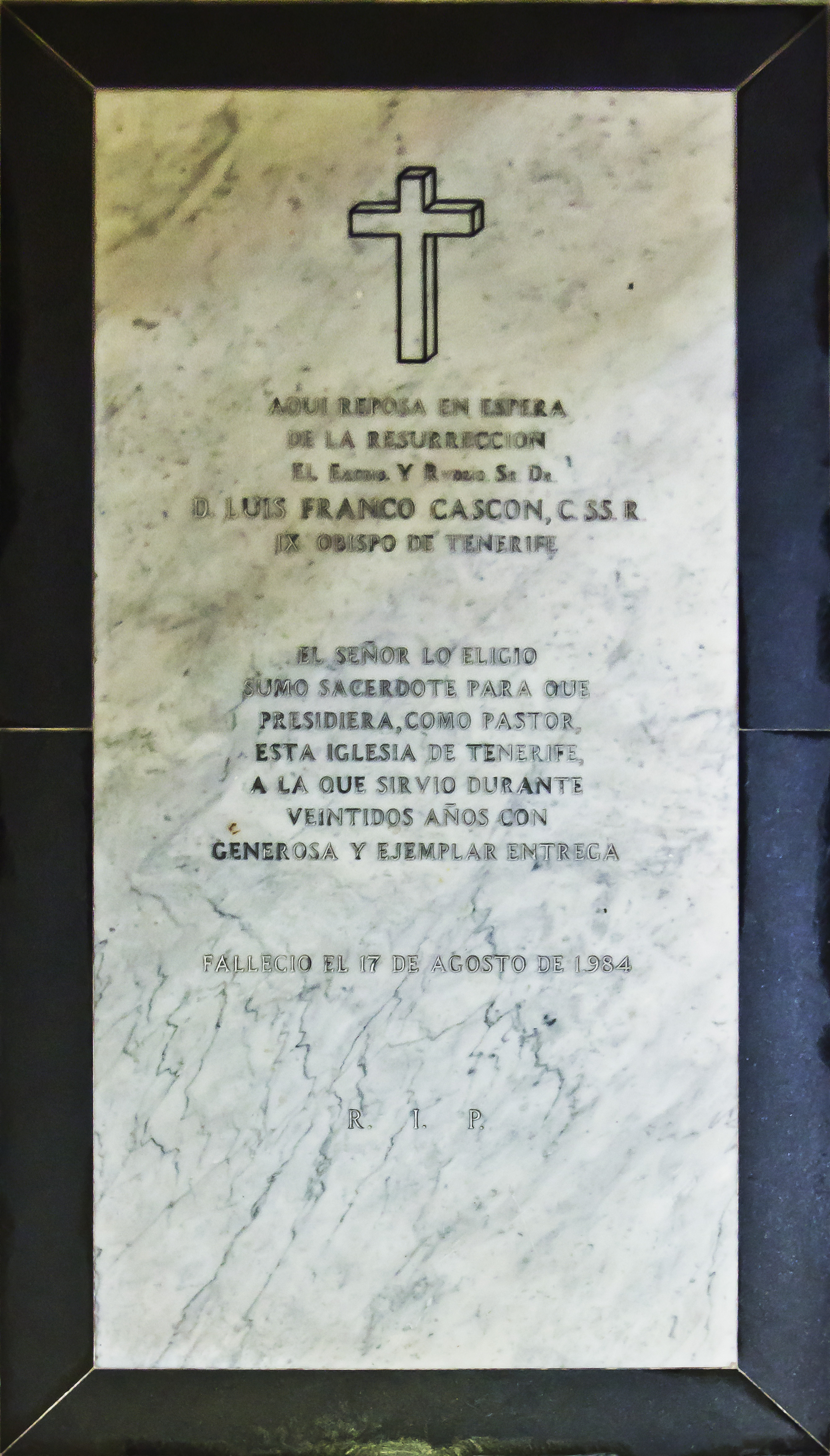
- Tomb of Luis Franco Cascón of the Cathedral of La Laguna.
- Church: Roman Catholic Church
- See: Roman Catholic Diocese of San Cristóbal de La Laguna or Diocese of Tenerife
- In office: 1882-1885
- Predecessor: Domingo Pérez Cáceres
- Successor: Damián Iguacén Borau
- Previous post: Priest

Personal details
- Born: 1903 Mansilla del Páramo, León-Spain
- Died: 17 August 1984 (aged 80–81) San Cristóbal de La Laguna, Tenerife, Spain

Luis Franco Cascón (Mansilla del Páramo, León, 1903 - San Cristóbal de La Laguna, Tenerife, 17 August 1984) was a Spanish ecclesiastic, ninth Bishop of the Roman Catholic Diocese of San Cristóbal de La Laguna.

== Pontificate ==
He was ordained priest in 1933. He was ordained bishop of Tenerife on 22 February 1962 by Pope John XXIII and was consecrated on 29 April that year in the Sanctuary of the Perpetual Help of Madrid, where he was rector.

On 21 May 1962 he entered the Diocese of Tenerife and on 11 October that year he attended the inauguration of the Second Vatican Council. The beatification of the future saints of the Canary Islands: Peter of Saint Joseph de Betancur and José de Anchieta took place during his pontificate in 1980.

He resigned his pontificate on 18 October 1983, when he turned 75 and was appointed Apostolic Administrator. He died in San Cristóbal de La Laguna on 17 August 1984. He was buried in the Chapel of the Christ of the Column of the Cathedral of La Laguna.
