= Luis Antonio Folgueras y Sión =

Spanish ecclesiastic

The Most Reverend Luis Antonio Folgueras y Sión
- Bishop of Roman Catholic Diocese of San Cristóbal de La Laguna and Archdiocese of Granada
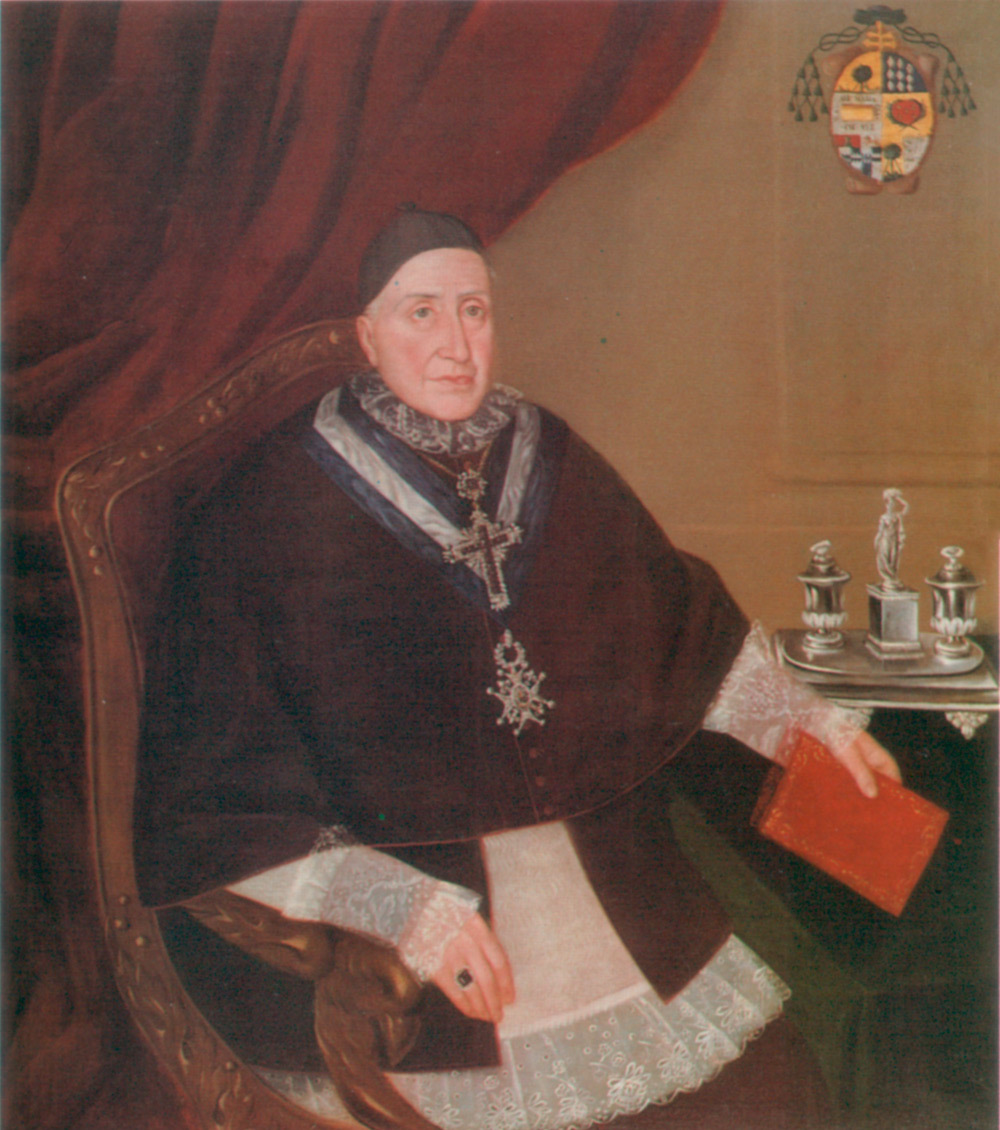
- Church: Roman Catholic Church
- See: Roman Catholic Diocese of San Cristóbal de La Laguna or Diocese of Tenerife and Archdiocese of Granada
- In office: 1824-1848
- Predecessor: None, first bishop of the diocese.
- Successor: Ildefonso Joaquín Infante y Macías
- Previous post: Priest

Personal details
- Born: 13 December 1769 Villavaler, León-Spain
- Died: 1850 (aged 80–81) Granada, Spain

Luis Antonio Folgueras y Sión (13 December 1769 in Villavaler, León – 1850 in Granada) was a Spanish ecclesiastic, first Bishop of the Roman Catholic Diocese of San Cristóbal de La Laguna and archbishop of Granada.

== Biography ==
He was selected as the first bishop of the newly created diocese of San Cristóbal de La Laguna on June 24, 1824, and was confirmed the following September 27. He took possession on June 19, 1825, the same day of his episcopal ordination. Its episcopado was characterized by the clashes with the Cathedral chapter.

He founded the Diocesan Seminary of La Laguna in 1832, closing for economic problems in 1834. He ruled the diocese until January 17, 1848, when his election as Archbishop of Granada was confirmed. After its transfer to Granada, the seat of Tenerife remained vacant, happening to the administrative tutelage of the Roman Catholic Diocese of Canarias until the signature of Concordat of 1851.

To date he has been the longest-serving bishop of San Cristóbal de la Laguna, with 24 years of pastoral service.

He died on October 28, 1850, in Granada, being buried in the cathedral.
