= Cristóbal Bencomo y Rodríguez =

Catholic priest

- Titular Archbishop
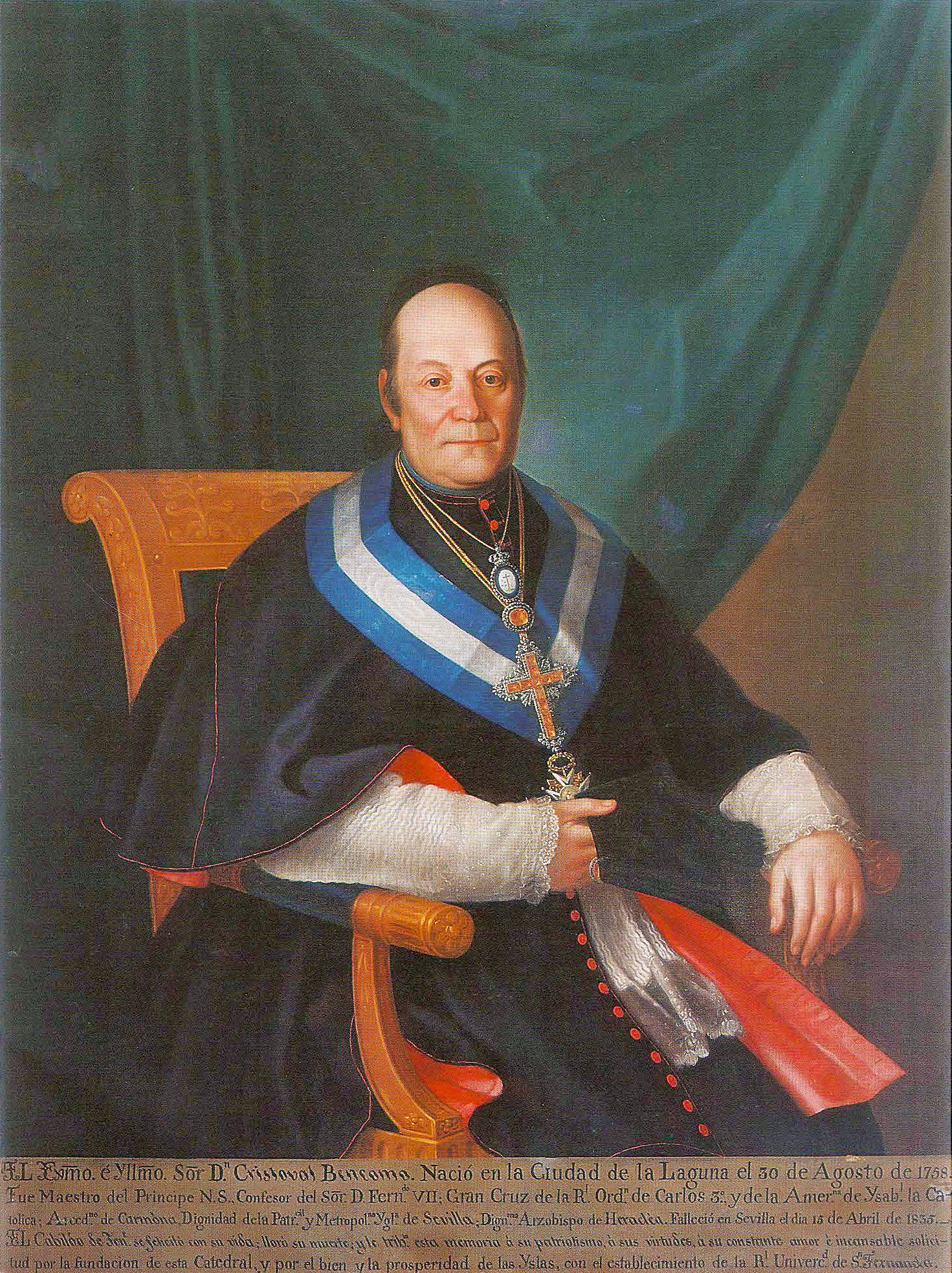
- Portrait of Cristóbal Bencomo y Rodríguez in La Laguna Cathedral (Tenerife)
- See: Titular Archbishop of Heraclea

Personal details
- Born: 30 August 1758 San Cristóbal de La Laguna, Spain
- Died: 15 April 1835 Sevilla, Spain
- Denomination: Catholic
- Profession: Confessor of King Ferdinand VII of Spain

Cristóbal Bencomo y Rodríguez (San Cristóbal de La Laguna, Tenerife, Spain, 30 August 1758 – 15 April 1835, Sevilla, Spain) was a Spanish Catholic priest and confessor of King Ferdinand VII of Spain.

Bencomo was the driving force behind the creation of the University of La Laguna (the first of the Canary Islands) and the Diocese of San Cristóbal de La Laguna, leading to the separation of the western Canary Islands in this new bishopric. Known for his many royal and ecclesiastical titles, he was one of the most important figures of the Spanish Catholic Church. Among his major positions were member of the council and chamber of Castile, Grand Inquisitor of Spain (a position he rejected), Grand Cross of the Order of Carlos III, and Titular Archbishop of Heraclea in partibus, given by Pope Pius VII.

== Biography ==
=== Early years ===
Cristóbal Bencomo was born in San Cristóbal de La Laguna on the island of Tenerife on 30 August 1758 to Francisco Braulio Bencomo and Bárbara Rodríguez Fleitas.

He had two other brothers: Pedro José and Santiago Bencomo y Rodríguez. All three were prominent clerics who contributed substantially to the founding of the University of San Fernando (now the University of La Laguna), promoted the works of the Cathedral of La Laguna and participated in the creation of the Diocese of San Cristóbal de La Laguna. The three brothers were descendants of Kebehi Benchomo, last Guanche mencey (aboriginal king) of Taoro. Of the three, Cristóbal Bencomo had the decisive role in the establishment of the college and the bishopric.

It is believed that Cristóbal began his studies under the tutelage of the Franciscan friars of the Convent of San Miguel de las Victorias (now the Real Santuario del Cristo de La Laguna). Because he was not a member of the Spanish bourgeoisie, he decided to study for an ecclesiastical career, which, along with the military, was considered a promising career.

Cristóbal excelled at his studies of philosophy and theology, and gained an extensive knowledge of Latin language and literature. After completing his studies, in 1790] he was given the tonsure and title of preacher by the Bishop of the Roman Catholic Diocese of Canarias, Fray Joaquín de Herrera de la Bárcena, as well as the appointment of master of pages and sacred ceremonies. After that he moved to Madrid, looking for better work opportunities. There, he devoted himself to the study of Greek literature and language.

=== Confessor of King ===
The King Carlos IV of Spain appointed him in 1793 Master of Philosophy and Policy their pages knights, and later professor of Latin to the Prince of Asturias, with the dignity of Cantor (chantre) of Plasencia. Later in 1800, Bencomo was named confessor of Prince Ferdinand VII of Spain, who had a certain complicity.

When Carlos IV and his son Fernando VII left for Bayonne to meet Napoleon, Bencomo returned for a while to Tenerife until 1814. Fernando VII returned to Madrid and demanded the presence in court of his confessor. The King ordered a warship sent to the island with the sole purpose of transporting him back to court with all possible pomp.

In 1815 the King bestowed upon Cristóbal Bencomo and Rodriguez the honors of board member and chamber of Castilla and the Grand Cross of the Royal and Distinguished Order of Carlos III, whose insignia was presented to him by the king himself in 1817. In the same year, Bencomo was given the title of Titular Archbishop of Heraclea, in partibus by Pope Pius VII, being sponsored in the consecration by the Infante Carlos, Count of Molina, who gave him a pontifical gift.

=== Creation of the University and the Diocese ===
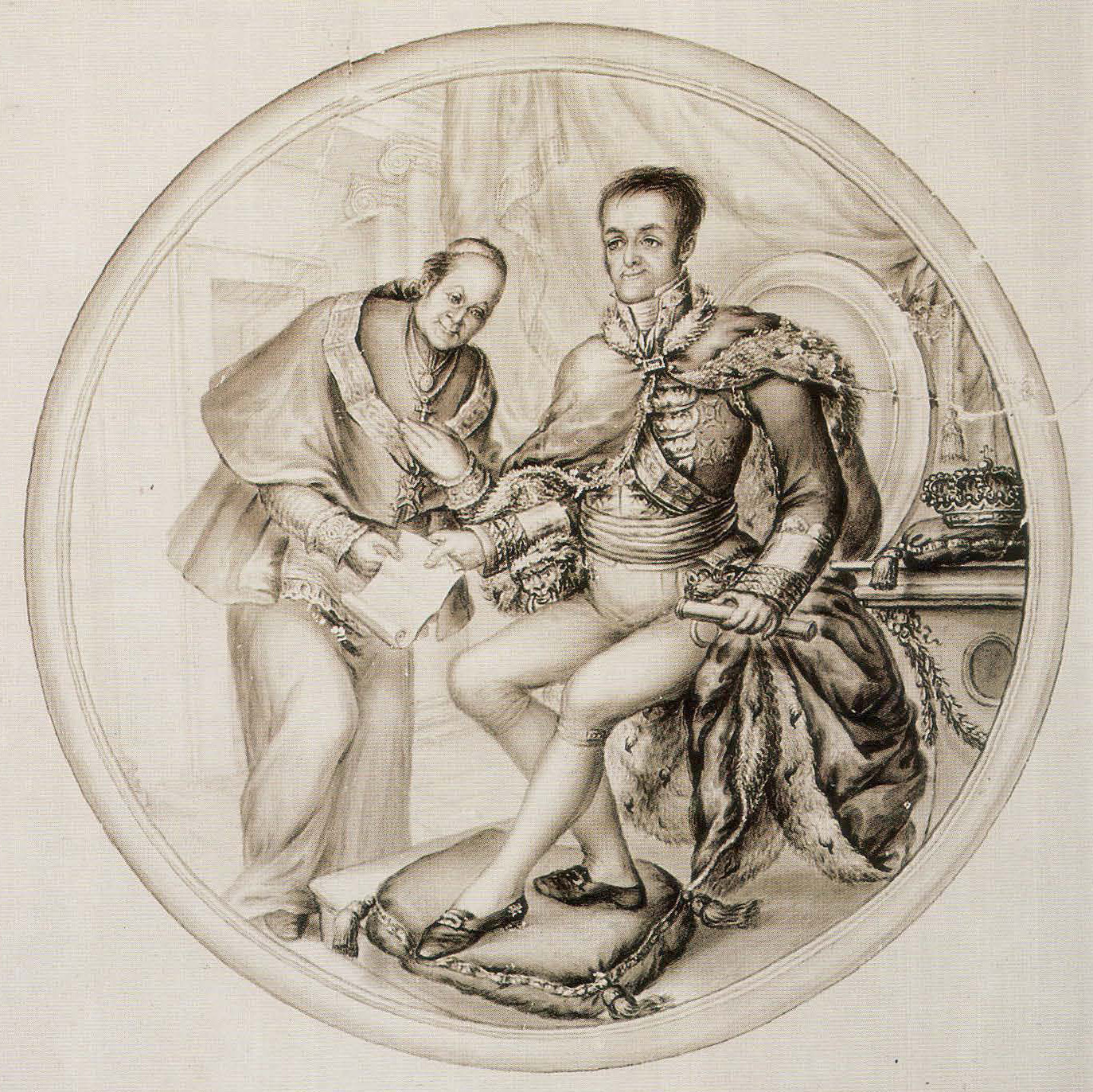
The King Ferdinand VII delivery to Cristóbal Bencomo the papal bull of creation of the Diocese. Engraving of Juan Abreu, ca. 1830.

Cristóbal Bencomo y Rodríguez was instrumental in creating the first university in the Canary Islands, the Literary University of San Fernando of San Cristóbal de La Laguna (University of La Laguna). This institution was created by royal charter in 1816.

In addition, the impeller and went straight benefactor of the creation of the Diocese of San Cristóbal de La Laguna. In 1818] in collaboration with the clergy and authorities in Tenerife calls for the creation of a new canary bishopric to the Holy See. The document requested it had the full support of King Fernando VII. It was a document called Instruction of the House of Castilla. On 1 February 1819, a papal bull approved the division of the bishopric of the Canary Islands in two dioceses. Finally, between February and December]1819 this diocese was created, since previously the Roman Catholic Diocese of Canarias was administering the entire archipelago. The Diocese of San Cristóbal de La Laguna includes the islands of Tenerife, La Palma, La Gomera and El Hierro.

The historical significance of the creation of the Diocese of San Cristóbal de La Laguna and the pivotal role Bencomo played are illustrated by the fact that attempts to establish a diocese based in the island of Tenerife dated back to the early sixteenth century, immediately after the completion of the conquest of the Canary Islands by the Crown of Castile. In fact, his first drive was Alonso Fernández de Lugo (conqueror of the islands of Tenerife and La Palma and "First Adelantado of the Canary Islands"). While the creation of the diocese would always be fiercely opposed by the then only bishop of the Canary Islands and members of the Cabildo Cathedral of Canary Islands, which were based on the island of Gran Canaria. So since then and for three centuries requests of clergy and society of Tenerife to erect the coveted bishopric. With cunning of Cristóbal Bencomo and invaluable support of his benefactor would succeed, King Ferdinand VII, would be achieved relatively quickly and simple erection of the diocese and the consequent Bencomo historical relationship with this church project.

=== Last years and death ===
In 1818, Fernando VII appointed him Inquisitor General of Spain, although this institution was in decline since the reforms of the Cortes of Cádiz. Bencomo rejected this appointment, because he understood that the Inquisition was an institution called the disappearance, it did not have the sympathy of the majority of secular and ecclesiastical estates. From this moment, his influence on the Spanish Court and the King began to decline.

Bencomo, elderly and sick moved to Seville with permission of the King, where he enjoyed the dignity of Archdeacon of Carmona. In Seville lent his assistance to the population in cases of great public calamities, and a cholera epidemic that hit the city in 1823. As proof of recognition of the Sevillian his portrait is exposed alongside other illustrious figures in the library colombina of the Cathedral of Seville, library located in the Patio de los Naranjos.

Cristóbal Bencomo and his brothers contributed financially to the construction of the neoclassical facade of the Cathedral of San Cristóbal de La Laguna and Cristóbal's personal library donated to the bishopric, the same that he had helped create. In addition, Bencomo donated to the cathedral two relics: a piece of the mantle of St. Ferdinand III of Castile and a bone of St. James the Less.

He died in Seville on 15 April 1835. It was tentatively buried in the Cathedral of Seville, next to the Royal Chapel. There he remained until 1837 his remains were transferred to the Cathedral of La Laguna in his native Tenerife.

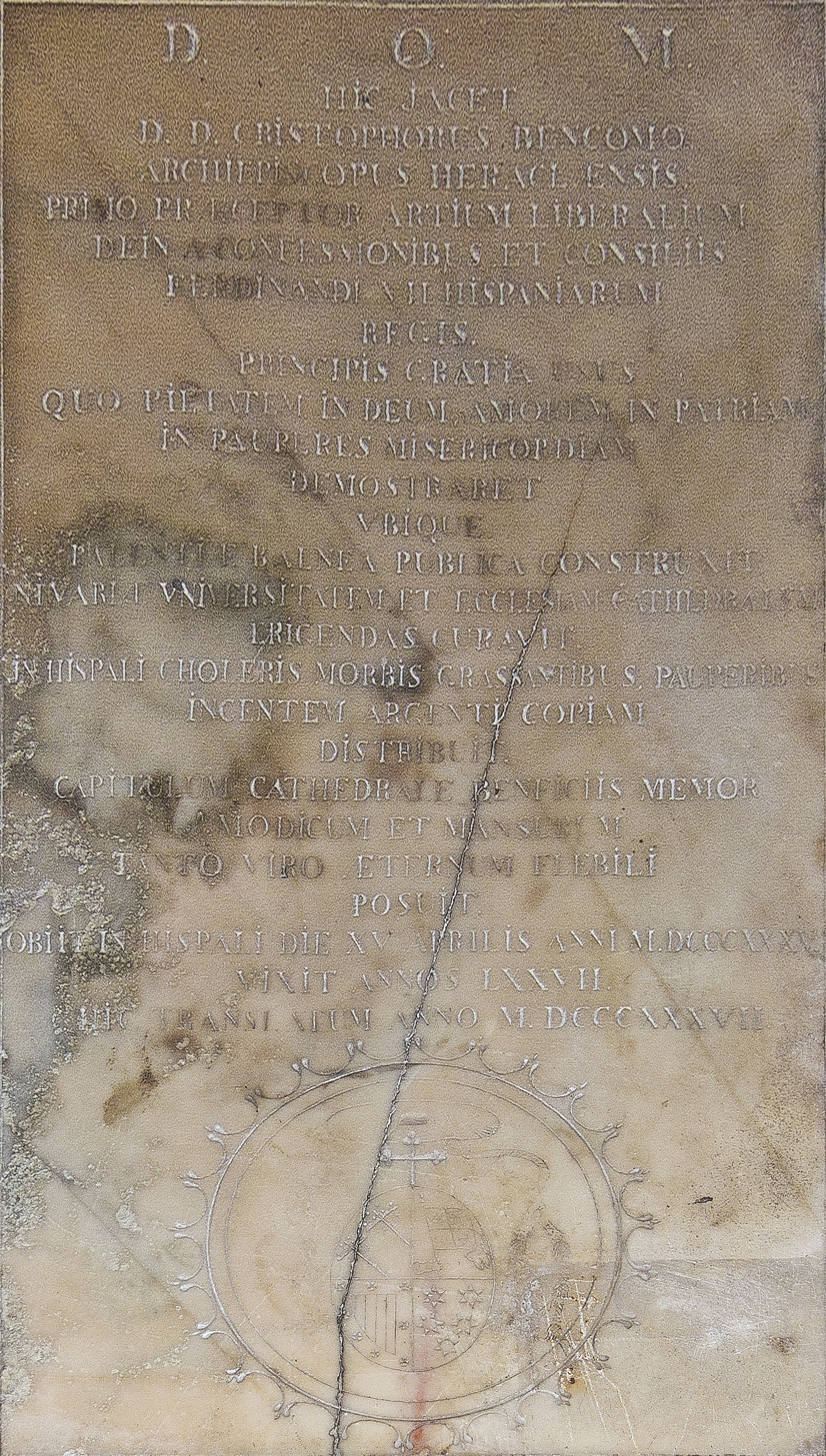
Tomb of Cristóbal Bencomo on the right side of the main chapel of the Cathedral of La Laguna

== Bencomo's brothers ==
Cristóbal Bencomo's two brothers were also two of the most influential clerics of the Canarian history.

His brother Pedro José (1749-1828), who was a canon of the Cathedral of Santa Ana in Las Palmas de Gran Canaria, later became the first dean of Tenerife, following the creation of the diocese. In addition, Pedro José was royal commissioner together with Don Alonso de Nava y Grimón for the establishment of the University of San Fernando which was its first rector.

His brother Santiago (1754-1818) was also dean of the Cathedral of Santa Ana de Las Palmas and canon of the same. He also had the titles of pensioned knight of the Royal and Distinguished Order of Carlos III, elected bishop of Astorga and a doctorate in sacred theology. There is an anecdotal passage in his biography relates that being canon of the Cathedral of Santa Ana, it happened that in 1810 broke out in the islands an epidemic of yellow fever and all political, military and ecclesiastical authorities of Las Palmas fled the city and took refuge in the interior of the island of Gran Canaria. However Bencomo remained at his post providing aid to those affected.

== Legacy ==
Cristóbal Bencomo and Rodríguez was the maker of the establishment of the first university in the Canary Islands, based in his hometown of San Cristóbal de La Laguna, a city that was therefore equated to big cities. The Kingdom of Spain also had prestigious universities, such is the case of perhaps the most famous of Spain, the University of Salamanca.

In his role as promoter of the creation of the diocese, he presumed to be the promoter of the ecclesiastical independence of the island of Tenerife and the western islands of the Canaries respect to one bishopric based in Las Palmas, which, in terms general has been considered beneficial by the islands of the Diocese of San Cristóbal de La Laguna and especially by society and the clergy of the island of Tenerife.

However, this fact has also been surrounded by controversy, since precisely the creation of the bishopric has been regarded as the initiator element called "Pleito insular", that is the confrontation involving over recent centuries by the bourgeoisie the islands of Tenerife and Gran Canaria by economic, political and institutional hegemony within the Canary islands. While others believe that that lawsuit started long before, namely with the collaboration of Aboriginal of Gran Canaria leader Fernando Guanarteme in the conquest of Tenerife.

== Works ==
In his literary facet, he is the author of several works:

- Instituciones Filosóficas para la enseñanza del Príncipe
- Carta a una señorita que le participó su estado de matrimonio (1804)
- Informe presentado a S.M. sobre el establecimiento de la Universidad en Canarias (1816)

In addition, Cristóbal Bencomo translated the Greek of New Testament, Sueño de Luciano and Tabla de Cebes. He also wrote several doctrinal letters.
