= Nicolás Rey y Redondo =

Spanish ecclesiastic

The Most Reverend Nicolás Rey y Redondo
- Bishop of Roman Catholic Diocese of San Cristóbal de La Laguna
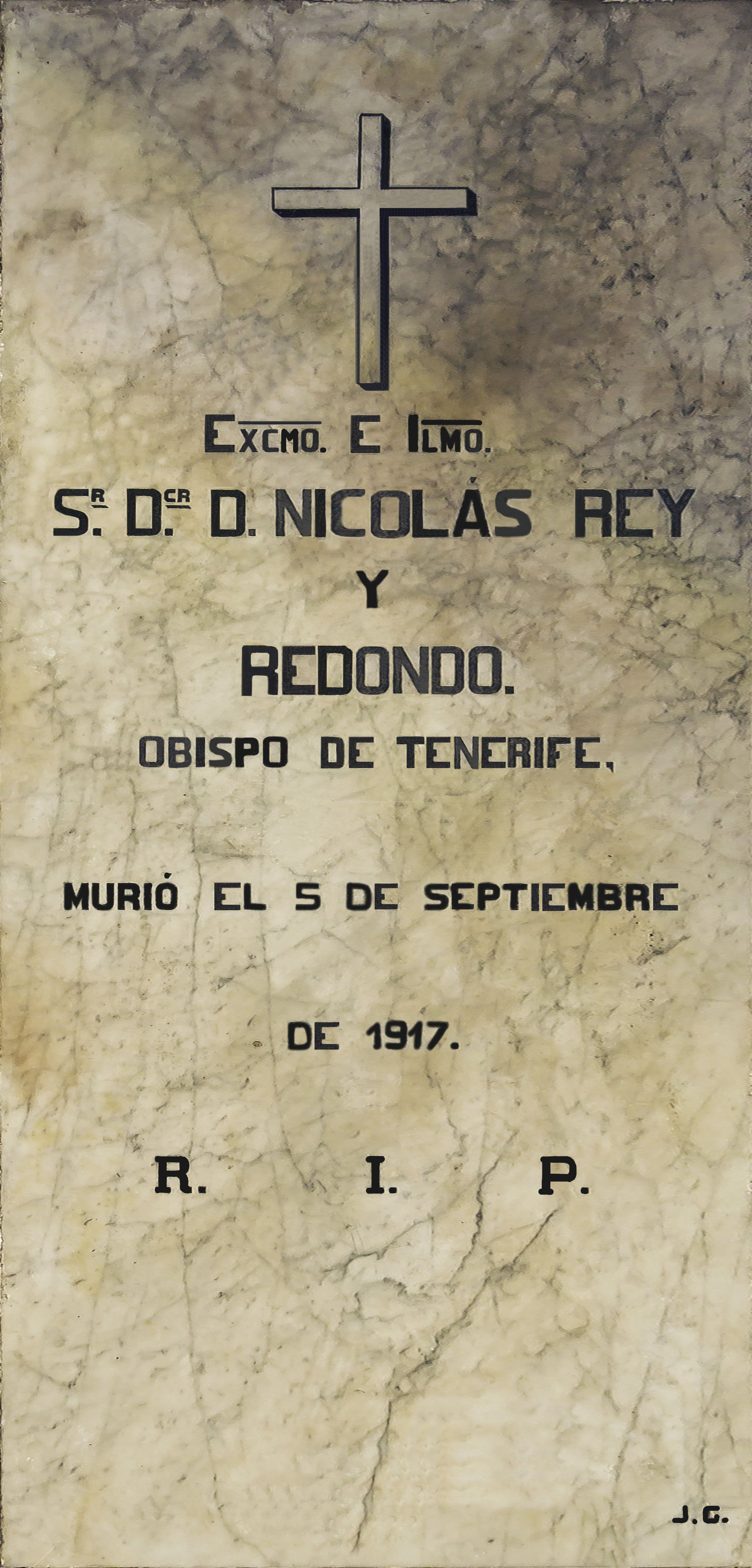
- Tomb of Nicolás Rey Redondo in the Cathedral of La Laguna.
- Church: Roman Catholic Church
- See: Roman Catholic Diocese of San Cristóbal de La Laguna or Diocese of Tenerife
- In office: 1894-1917
- Predecessor: Ramón Torrijos y Gómez
- Successor: Gabriel Llompart y Jaume Santandreu
- Previous post: Priest

Personal details
- Born: February 1, 1834 Burgos-Spain
- Died: September 5, 1917 (aged 83) San Cristóbal de La Laguna, Tenerife, Spain

Nicolás Rey y Redondo (February 1, 1834, Burgos - September 5, 1917, San Cristóbal de La Laguna, Tenerife) was a Spanish ecclesiastic, fifth Bishop of the Roman Catholic Diocese of San Cristóbal de La Laguna.

== Episcopate ==
Nicolás took possession as bishop of Tenerife by Royal Decree of February 5, 1894, of Queen Victoria Eugenie of Battenberg, although this appointment had to be confirmed by Pope Leo XIII, who confirmed it on May 21 of that same year. King and Redondo received the episcopal consecration on September 8 of that year and on November 9 he arrived in the diocese.

He was the promoter of the construction of the new Cathedral of San Cristóbal de La Laguna, which was consecrated on September 6, 1913. In total he ordained 44 diocesan priests. He died in San Cristóbal de La Laguna on September 5, 1917, and was buried in the Chapel of the Immaculate Conception of the Cathedral of La Laguna.
