= Courias (Pravia) =

Parish (parroquia) in Pravia, Asturias, Spain

Coordinates: 43.45°N 6.138611°W

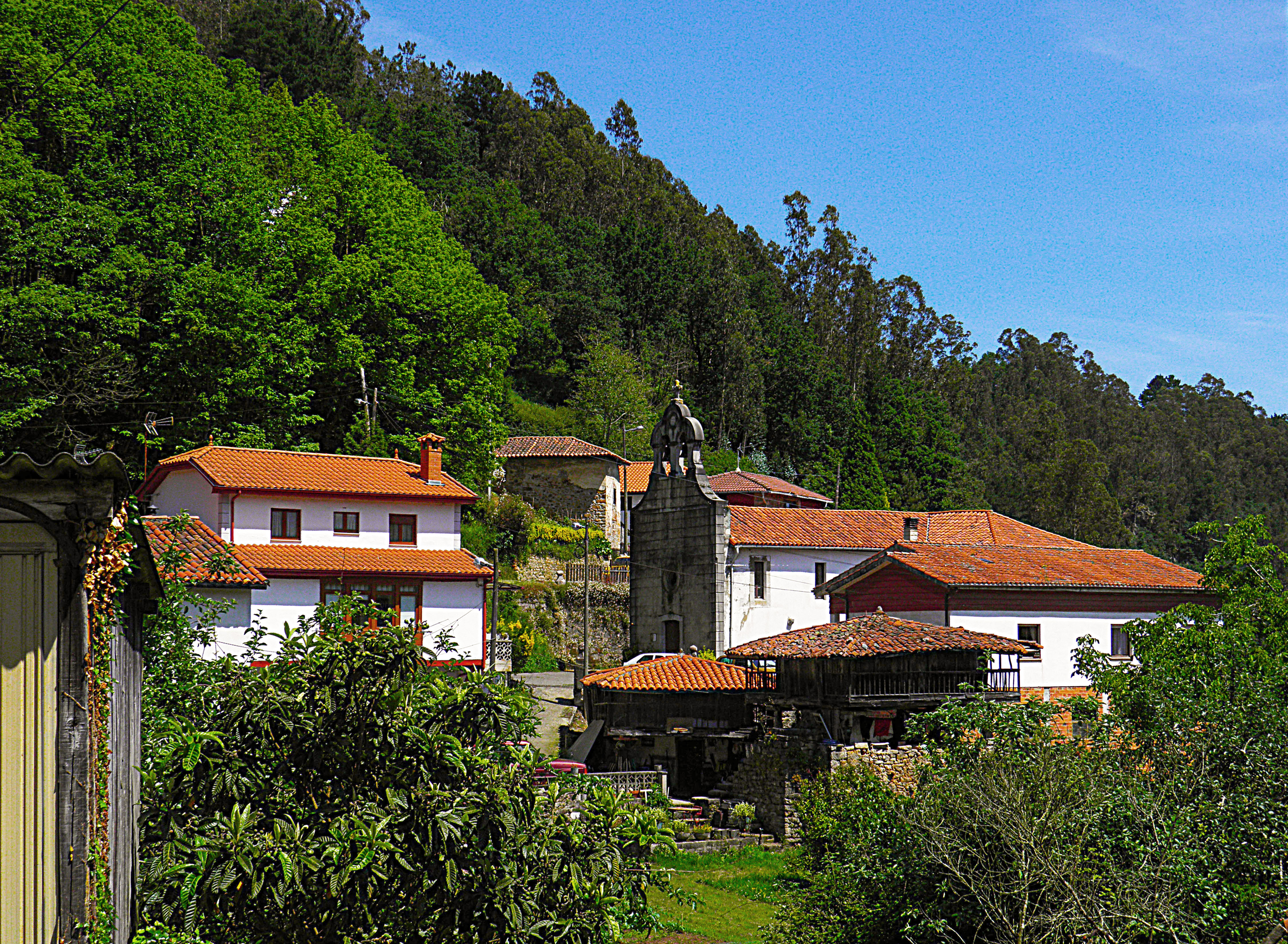
Corias

Courias (Asturian pronunciation: [ˈkowɾjas]) is one of fifteen parishes (administrative divisions) in Pravia, a municipality within the province and autonomous community of Asturias, in northern Spain.

The population is 166 (INE 2022).

== Villages and hamlets ==
Las Campas

- La Braña

Courias

- Cabrafigal
- Carriel
- El Castiellu
- El Covayu
- El Puente
- La Brueba
- La Calle
- La Campa
- La Casona
- La Cueva
- La Fábrica
- La Hortona
- La Pardal
  - La Pardal de Baxu
  - La Pardal de Riba
- La Parrionda
- La Pruída
- Zampuya

Lluerces

- El Curión
- El Fabeiru [de Lluerces]
- El Polléu
- El Tesu
- La Peña

Palla

- El Fabeiru [de Palla]

Repolles

- Casa Pachón
- El Molín
- La Casa Verdeña
- Repolles de Baxu
- Repolles de Riba

Veigañán

- El Campón
- El Llereiru
- El Secaderu
- Veigañán de Baxu
- Veigañán d'Arriba

Villanueva

- La Cantera
- Las Cabañas
  - Las Cabañas d'Arriba
  - Las Cabañas d'Abaxu
