= Diocese of San Cristóbal de La Laguna =

Catholic diocese in Spain

Diocese of San Cristóbal de La Laguna Dioecesis Sancti Christophori de Laguna or Dioecesis Nivariensis Diócesis de San Cristóbal de La Laguna or Diócesis de Tenerife

Catholic
- Logotype

Location
- Country: Spain
- Ecclesiastical province: Seville
- Metropolitan: Seville

Statistics
- Area: 3,381 km^{2} (1,305 sq mi)
- Population: Total; Catholics: (as of 2010); 1,020,490; 884,000 (86.6%)

Information
- Denomination: Catholic Church
- Sui iuris church: Latin Church
- Rite: Roman Rite
- Established: 1 February 1819
- Cathedral: Cathedral of San Cristóbal de La Laguna

Current leadership
- Pope: Leo XIV
- Bishop: Eloy Alberto Santiago
- Metropolitan Archbishop: José Ángel Saiz Meneses
- Bishops emeritus: Bernardo Álvarez Afonso

Map
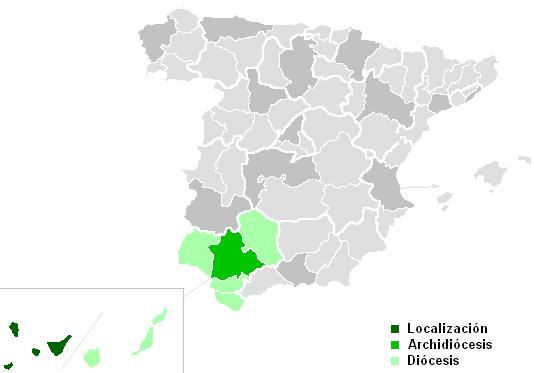

Website
- Website of the Diocese

The Diocese of San Cristóbal de La Laguna (Latin: Sancti Christophori de Laguna), also called Diocese of Tenerife or Diocese Nivariense, is a diocese located in the city of San Cristóbal de La Laguna in the Canary Islands and a suffragan in the ecclesiastical province of the Archdiocese of Sevilla in Spain. The diocese includes the islands of Tenerife, La Palma, La Gomera and El Hierro, in the province of Santa Cruz de Tenerife.

== History ==
=== Evangelizing missions ===
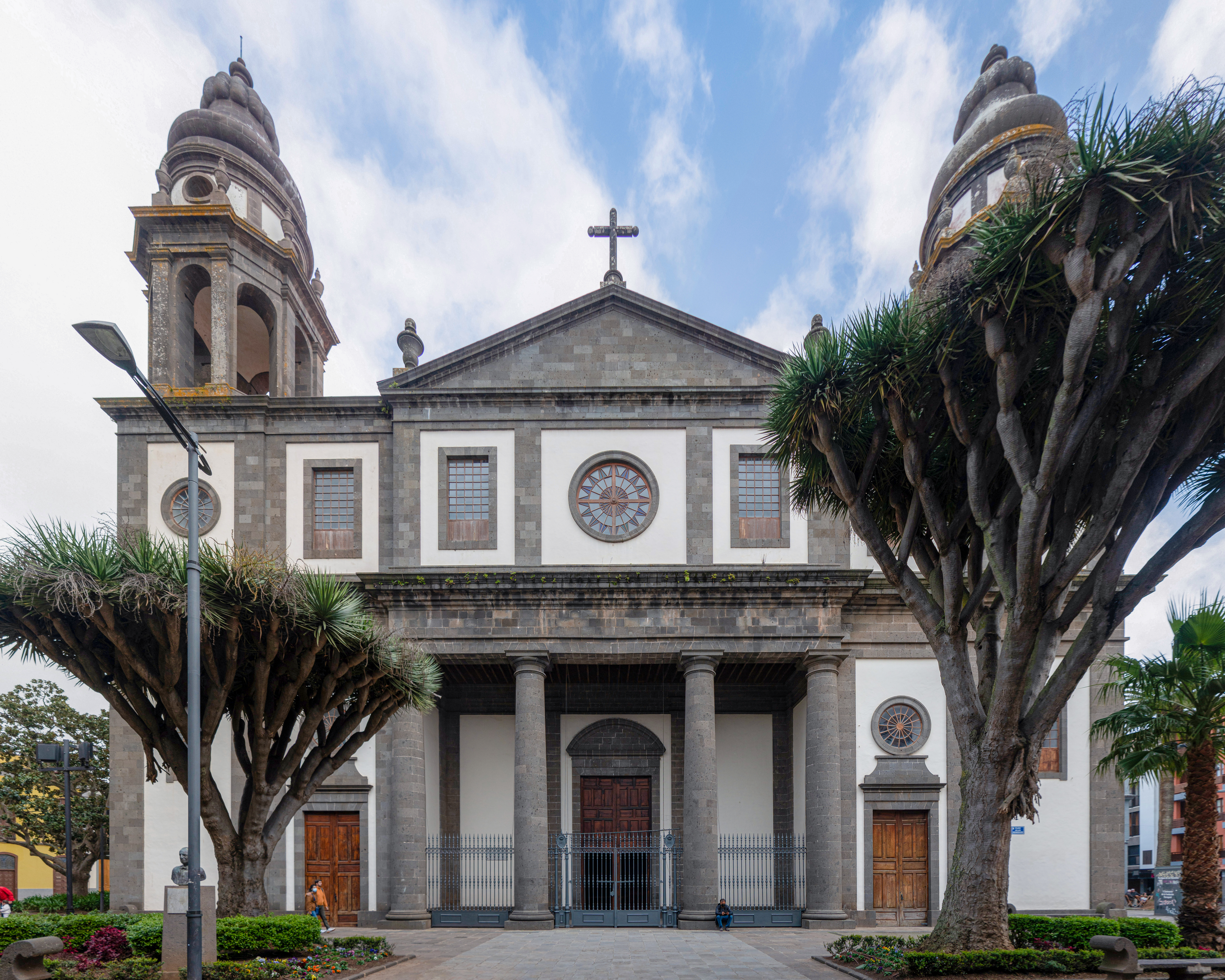
La Laguna Cathedral

The arrival of Christianity to the western islands of the Canaries took place (as in the eastern islands) before the complete conquest of the archipelago and its incorporation into the Crown of Castile held in 1496 with the conquest of the island of Tenerife. Christianization was motivated basically as preparation for the subsequent conquest.

In this work the Normans missionary friars and then Catalan and Majorcan (especially Franciscans and Dominicans) who settled first in the eastern islands where even founded bishoprics and from where they began to evangelize the Westerners occupied. These, (as will happen later in America) accompanied the conquistadores in their mission to convert and catechize the aboriginals guanches, which like other ancient peoples had their own religion. Perhaps in this respect, the Christianization undertaken by the friar and missionary Alfonso de Bolaños, dubbed the "Apostle of Tenerife", stands out among the guanches, about 30 years before the conquest of it.

After the conquest these cults or syncretic be eradicated and replaced by the Catholic religion. The presence of Christian elements in the western islands of the Canaries in the period before the conquest is a palpable fact, example of this is the presence in two of these islands marianas images that reach great notoriety throughout the entire archipelago: The Virgin of Candelaria in Tenerife (Patron Saint of the Canary Islands) and the Virgen de las Nieves (Patron Saint of La Palma). It is believed that these images have been brought to these islands by missionaries Catalan or Majorcan a century before being revered by Aborigines since.

Recently in Tenerife a Christian cross was found engraved in the rock and oriented to the sun, in a Guanche site in the municipality of Buenavista del Norte. This symbol was found in a megalith used for fecundity rituals and as a solar calendar. This finding highlights the supposed knowledge that the aborigines had of Christianity.

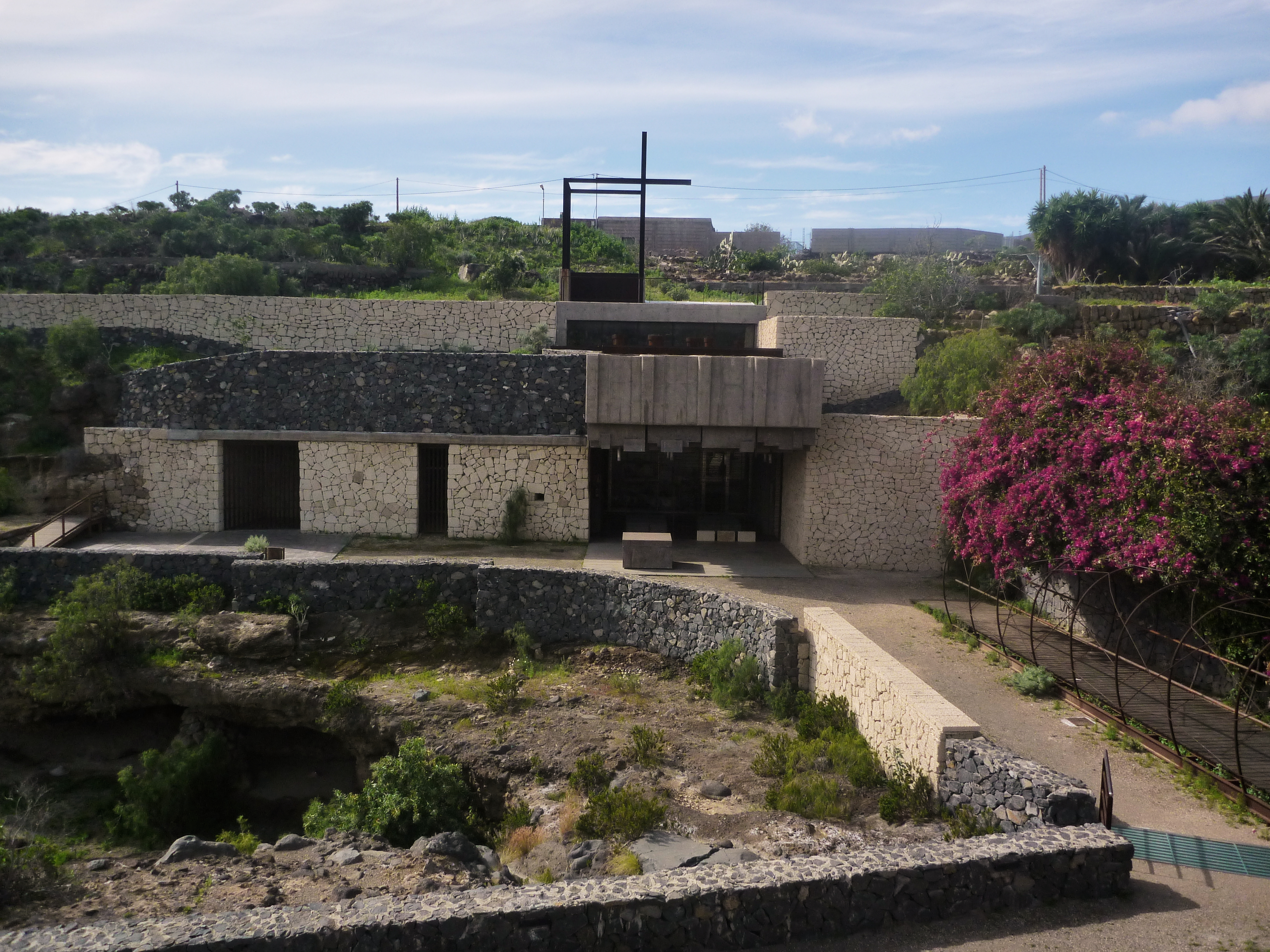
The cave of Chinguaro in Tenerife was the first place where aboriginal Guanches worshiped the Virgin of Candelaria.

=== After the conquest ===
The origins of creating a diocese based in Tenerife has its home since shortly after the conquest of the Canaries, it was the same Alonso Fernández de Lugo (conqueror of Tenerife) who in 1513 asked the Court to the island of Tenerife had an Episcopal see, calling for it to move the diocesan headquarters Canary Islands of Las Palmas de Gran Canaria to San Cristóbal de La Laguna.

A short time later after the conquest of the Canary Islands, Tenerife quickly became the most populated island of the archipelago and San Cristóbal de La Laguna in the most important town in the Canary Islands. Fernández de Lugo, who had received the title of «Primer Adelantado de las Islas Canarias» by the Kings of Spain wished therefore raise the ecclesiastical rank of San Cristóbal de La Laguna, a city he founded and where his residence was located.

At that time, was still fresh the transfer of the Episcopal see of the Canary Islands to the city of Las Palmas on the island of Gran Canaria, home initially was in San Marcial del Rubicón in the south of the island of Lanzarote (by being this first conquered the island). However the idea of moving the bishopric to the city of La Laguna was not prospered. The reasons for the refusal were based primarily on the fact that it had already begun to build and expand the new Cathedral of Santa Ana in Las Palmas, the oligarchy of Gran Canaria wanted to have some stability and independence of the governing authorities of the Canary Islands that were based in the La Laguna.

Soon after, he attempted to share the diocesan headquarters between Las Palmas and La Laguna but that idea did not prosper. In 1515 the then only municipality of Tenerife (with Fernández de Lugo in the lead) took the founding act of the Church of Our Lady of Remedies (now La Laguna Cathedral) to convey to the court the need for residence in Tenerife from members of the Cathedral chapter of Canaries, which had it based in Las Palmas de Gran Canaria. On 19 November 1517 the council again sent to the Court a letter in similar terms which were ratified in the earlier decision, which did not reach any positive response. Subsequently, requests for creation of a diocese stated that its jurisdiction should cover the western islands of the Canaries.

In the 16th, 17th and 18th centuries there will be a boom of contemplative and religious life. At this time born in Tenerife: Peter of Saint Joseph Betancur and José de Anchieta, the two native saints of the Canary Islands. Both were two of the greatest missionaries in Latin America. Another important religious figure born at the time was the Servant of God Mary of Jesus de León y Delgado, whose body remains uncorrupted.

In 1783 he again requested the erection of a diocese in San Cristóbal de La Laguna (so that it encompasses the western islands of the Canary Islands), which was taken with great suspicion by members of the Cathedral Chapter and Bishop, preventing him ecclesiastical institutions based in Gran Canaria.

=== Creation of the diocese ===
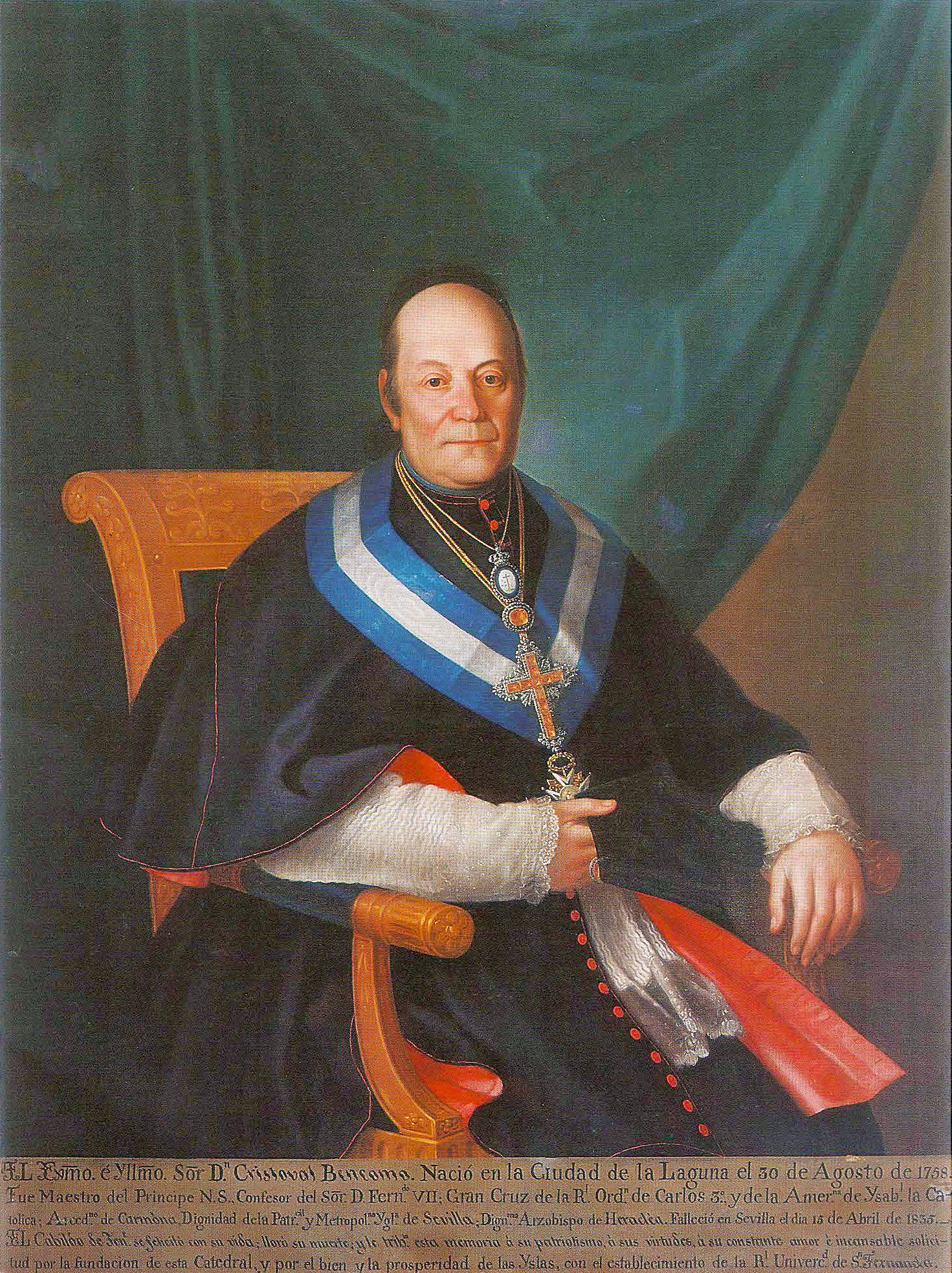
Cristóbal Bencomo y Rodríguez. Confessor of King Ferdinand VII of Spain and Titular Archbishop of Heraclea. He was the great promoter of the creation of the Diocese of San Cristobal de La Laguna.

In 1818, the clergy and the authorities of Tenerife requested again the creation of the Diocese to the Holy See (this time with the support of King Ferdinand VII of Spain) in a document called Instruction of the Chamber of Castile, having a favorable response of Pope. In this role it played an important role the priest Cristóbal Bencomo y Rodríguez, confessor of King Ferdinand VII and Titular Archbishop of Heraclea.

On February 1, 1819 a papal bull of Pope Pius VII approved the division of the bishopric of the Canary Islands in two dioceses. Finally, between February and December 1819 this diocese is created, since previously the Roman Catholic Diocese of Canarias was administering the entire archipelago.

The Pope Pius VII in establishing the diocese determines that Bula fundamental aspects of the organization of the same; the cathedral headquarters is the Parish of Our Lady of Remedies of San Cristóbal de La Laguna, that the diocese is formed by the four western islands of the Canary Islands (El Hierro, La Palma, La Gomera and Tenerife), the official name the diocese is the same as the city where it is based, that the documents concerning the diocese of San Cristóbal de La Laguna deposited with the secretary of the curia of Las Palmas should be transferred to the new diocese, the diocese and its cathedral are suffragan of the Archdiocese of Seville, and the patronage of the new diocese is established as follows: The Our Lady of Remedies main patron of the cathedral and the diocese, and St. Ferdinand III of Castile and St. Elizabeth of Aragon like the saints small employers the same.

As a result of the Concordat of 1851, the suppression of several Spanish dioceses that had been recently created, including the Diocese of San Cristóbal de La Laguna which should be annexed to the Roman Catholic Diocese of Canarias is established. The Cathedral Chapter of Canaries yet positioned against such a measure defending the independence of the Diocese of Tenerife. Subsequently, the Vatican requires that one of the diocese condemned to disappear remains. For this reason it establishes the conservation and restoration of the diocese of Tenerife. After several failed attempts to appoint a bishop, Mr. Ildefonso Joaquín Infante y Macías was appointed in 1877.

=== Nowadays ===
The current bishop, 13th of the Diocese of San Cristóbal de La Laguna is Monsignor Eloy Alberto Santiago. The diocese has about 892,000 baptized in 2014. It is also the Canarian diocese has both more priests (255), as permanent deacons (6) and parishes (312).

On June 12, 2026, the diocese received a visit from Pope Leo XIV, who visited the island of Tenerife during his apostolic visit to Spain. This was the first visit by a pontiff to the Canary Islands. The Pope toured the cities of San Cristóbal de La Laguna (the episcopal capital) and Santa Cruz de Tenerife (the island's capital).

== Chronology ==
Chronology since the creation of the Diocese until today:

- 1819: 1 February. The Diocese of San Cristóbal de La Laguna separates of till then the unique diocese of the archipelago the Diocese of Canarias.
- 1875: is tried to join uselessly this diocese with the Diocese Canariense.
- 1877: D. Ildefonso Infante y Macías, he is nominated A Bishop of the Diocese Nivariense.
- 1959: the Missionary and Idente Missionaries foundation was founded in this diocese, composed of religious men and women, as well as secular missionaries, single or married.
- 1964–1965: between October 1964 and January 1965, the Diocese of Tenerife conducted the largest pilgrimage took place in the history of the Canary Islands, the transfer of the image of the Virgin of Candelaria (Saint Patron of Canary Islands) for all municipalities and cities island of Tenerife.
- Between 1998 and 1999, the diocese held its first diocesan synod (Diocesan Synod Nivariense), focused primarily on understanding of Second Vatican Council, the entry into the third millennium of the birth of Christ with a spiritual renewal of the diocese and give the right answer profound social, political and cultural changes.
- 2006: On 23 January, a fire finished with the Palace of the family Salazar of Cold (Counts of Salazar's Valley) that up to the moment was sedate her episcopal. It was a building of the 17th century, though until the end of the 19th century it was not the bishop's residence. It was rebuilt in 2009.
- 2019: On February 1 this year marked the 200th anniversary of the creation of the diocese with religious and cultural events between 2019 and 2020.
- 2026: 12 June. The diocese received a visit from Pope Leo XIV during his apostolic journey to Spain.

== Saint patrons ==
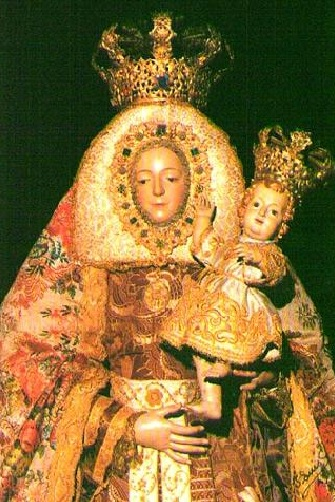
Virgin of Los Remedios, patron saint of the diocese. The image is venerated in the Cathedral of La Laguna.

The principal patron saint of the diocese is the Virgin of Los Remedios. Smaller patron saints are St. Ferdinand III of Castile and St. Elizabeth of Portugal. The patron saint of the Canary Islands is the Virgin of Candelaria, whose shrine belongs to this diocese. St. Saint Christopher is the titular saint (non-patron saint) of the Diocese because it bears the name of the city, and therefore includes the name of this saint.

The patronage of the islands of this Diocese is as follows:

- Patroness of the island of Tenerife: Our Lady of Los Remedios.
- Patroness of the island of La Gomera: Our Lady of Guadalupe.
- Patroness of the island of La Palma: Our Lady of the Snows.
- Patroness of the island of El Hierro: Our Lady of the Kings.

Saint patron saint of the islands:

- St. Michael (Patron of the islands of La Palma and Tenerife).
- St. Sebastian (Patron of La Gomera).
- St. Augustine of Hippo (Patron of El Hierro).

== Festivities ==
The own and official Liturgical Calendar of the diocese, approved by the Apostolic See includes the following festivities:

- February 2: Festivity of Our Lady the Virgin of Candelaria, patron saint of the Canary Islands – Solemnity.
- April 24: Festivity of Saint Peter of Saint Joseph de Betancur, layperson – Feast.
- June 9: Festivity of Saint José de Anchieta, priest – Feast.
- July 15: Festivity of the Blessed Martyrs of Tazacorte, martyrs – Obligatory Memorial.
- July 27: Festivity of Saint Christopher, titular saint of the diocese, martyr – Solemnity.
- September 6: Festivity of the dedication of the Cathedral of San Cristóbal de La Laguna – Solemnity (in the cathedral), Feast (in the diocese).

== Pastoral division ==
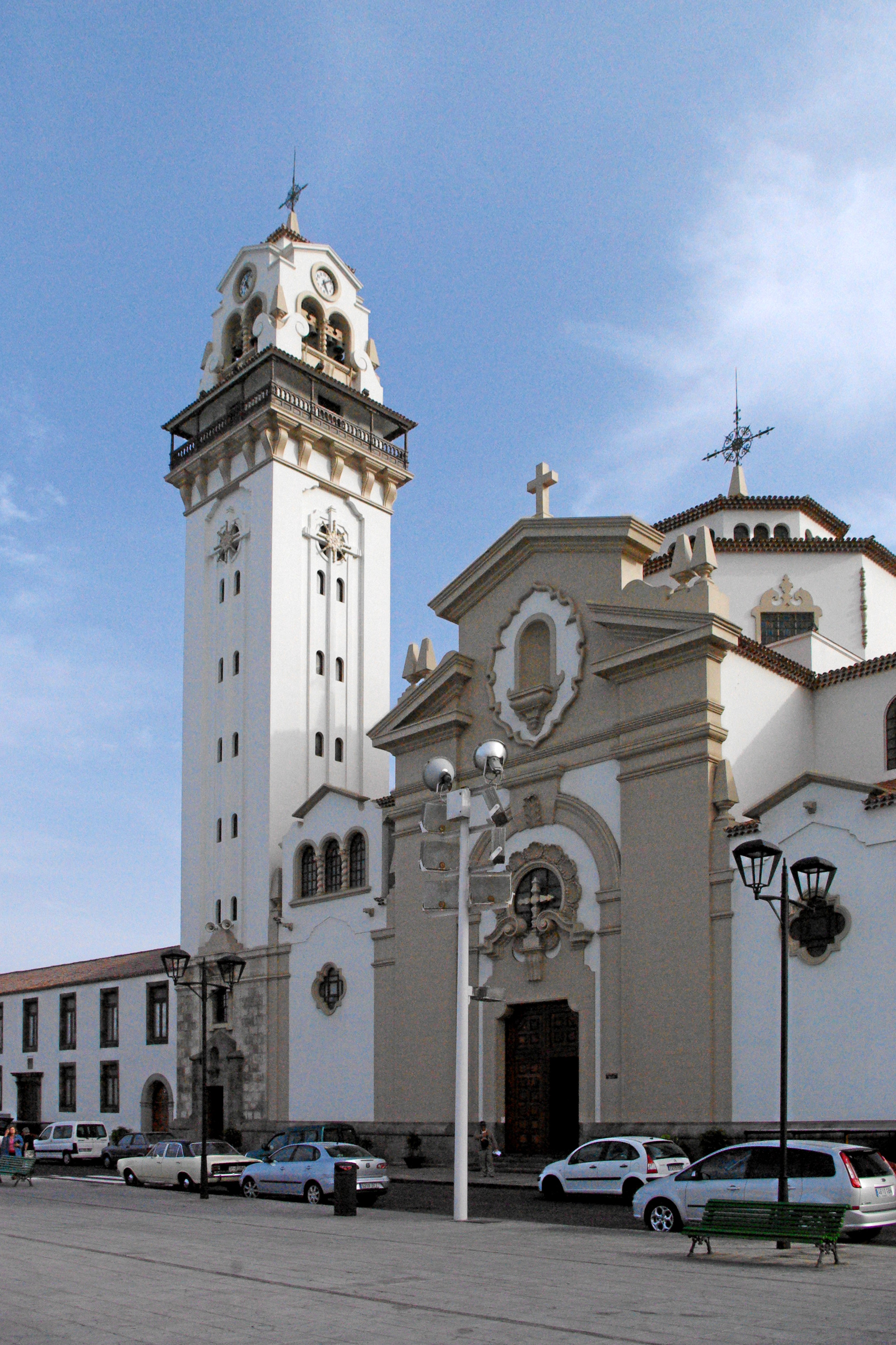
Basilica of the Royal Marian Shrine of Our Lady of Candelaria, patron saint of the Canary Islands.

In its internal organization the diocese is divided into 17 arciprestazgos (deaneries), to the front of which is an archpriest who is in charge of administering it, attending to the requests of the clergy and watching over the care of the cult. The arciprestazgos are distributed between the different islands:

In Tenerife:

- Arciprestazgo de Icod
- Arciprestazgo de Isora
- Arciprestazgo de Güímar
- Arciprestazgo de Granadilla
- Arciprestazgo de La Cuesta
- Arciprestazgo de La Laguna
- Arciprestazgo de La Orotava
- Arciprestazgo de La Salud
- Arciprestazgo de Ofra
- Arciprestazgo de Taco
- Arciprestazgo de Tacoronte
- Arciprestazgo de Tegueste
- Arciprestazgo de Santa Cruz de Tenerife

In La Palma:

- Arciprestazgo de Los Llanos de Aridane
- Arciprestazgo de Santa Cruz de La Palma

The islands of La Gomera and El Hierro have one archpriest each for the entire island territory:

- Arciprestazgo de La Gomera
- Arciprestazgo de El Hierro

== Iglesia Nivariense ==
Iglesia Nivariense
Magazine	Iglesia Nivariense
Country	Spain
City where it is edited	San Cristóbal de La Laguna
Distribution area	Santa Cruz de Tenerife (province)
Language	Spanish
Periodicity	Monthly
Web site	Diócesis de Tenerife

Iglesia Nivariense (Church Nivariense) is a religious magazine published by the Diocese of Tenerife. The publication deals with the religious celebrations of the diocese and related religious topics.

Also it publishes for other islands that shape the diocese: La Palma, La Gomera and El Hierro. In the magazine there do not appear sections of politics, economy or sports. It is published especially to distribute it in the parishes and churches of the Diocese of Tenerife.

The slogan of this magazine is a "Publication of the Diocese of Tenerife".

== Special churches ==
- Cathedral of La Laguna, La Laguna, Tenerife.
- Basilica of Candelaria, Candelaria, Tenerife.
- Iglesia Matriz de la Concepción, La Laguna, Tenerife.
- Real Santuario del Santísimo Cristo de La Laguna, La Laguna, Tenerife.
- Real Santuario de Nuestra Señora de las Nieves, Santa Cruz de La Palma, La Palma.
- Iglesia Matriz de la Concepción, Santa Cruz de Tenerife, Tenerife.
- Iglesia del Salvador, Santa Cruz de La Palma, La Palma.
- Iglesia de la Asunción, San Sebastián de La Gomera, La Gomera.
- Iglesia de la Concepción, Valverde, El Hierro.
- Iglesia del Apóstol Santiago, Los Realejos, Tenerife.

== Leadership ==
- Luis Antonio Folgueras y Sión (24 Jun 1824 – 17 Jan 1848)
- Ildefonso Joaquín Infante y Macías, O.S.B. (20 Mar 1877 – 14 January 1882)
- Jacinto María Cervera y Cervera (27 Mar 1882 – 21 Jul 1885)
- Ramón Torrijos y Gómez (25 Nov 1887 – 21 May 1894)
- Nicolás Rey y Redondo (21 May 1894 Appointed – 5 Sep 1917)
- Gabriel Llompart y Jaume Santandreu (17 May 1918 – 27 Jun 1922)
- Albino González y Menéndez Reigada, O.P. (18 Dec 1924 – 18 Feb 1946)
- Domingo Pérez Cáceres (28 Apr 1947 – 1 Aug 1961)
- Luis Franco Cascón, C.SS.R. (19 Feb 1962 – 18 Oct 1983)
- Damián Iguacén Borau (14 Aug 1984 – 12 Jun 1991)
- Felipe Fernández García (12 Jun 1991 – 29 Jun 2005)
- Bernardo Álvarez Afonso (29 June 2005 – 16 September 2024)
- Eloy Alberto Santiago Santiago (24 February 2025 – present)

== Saints and Blesseds ==
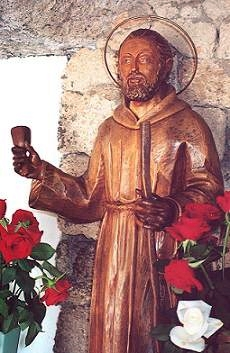
Saint Peter of Saint Joseph Betancur

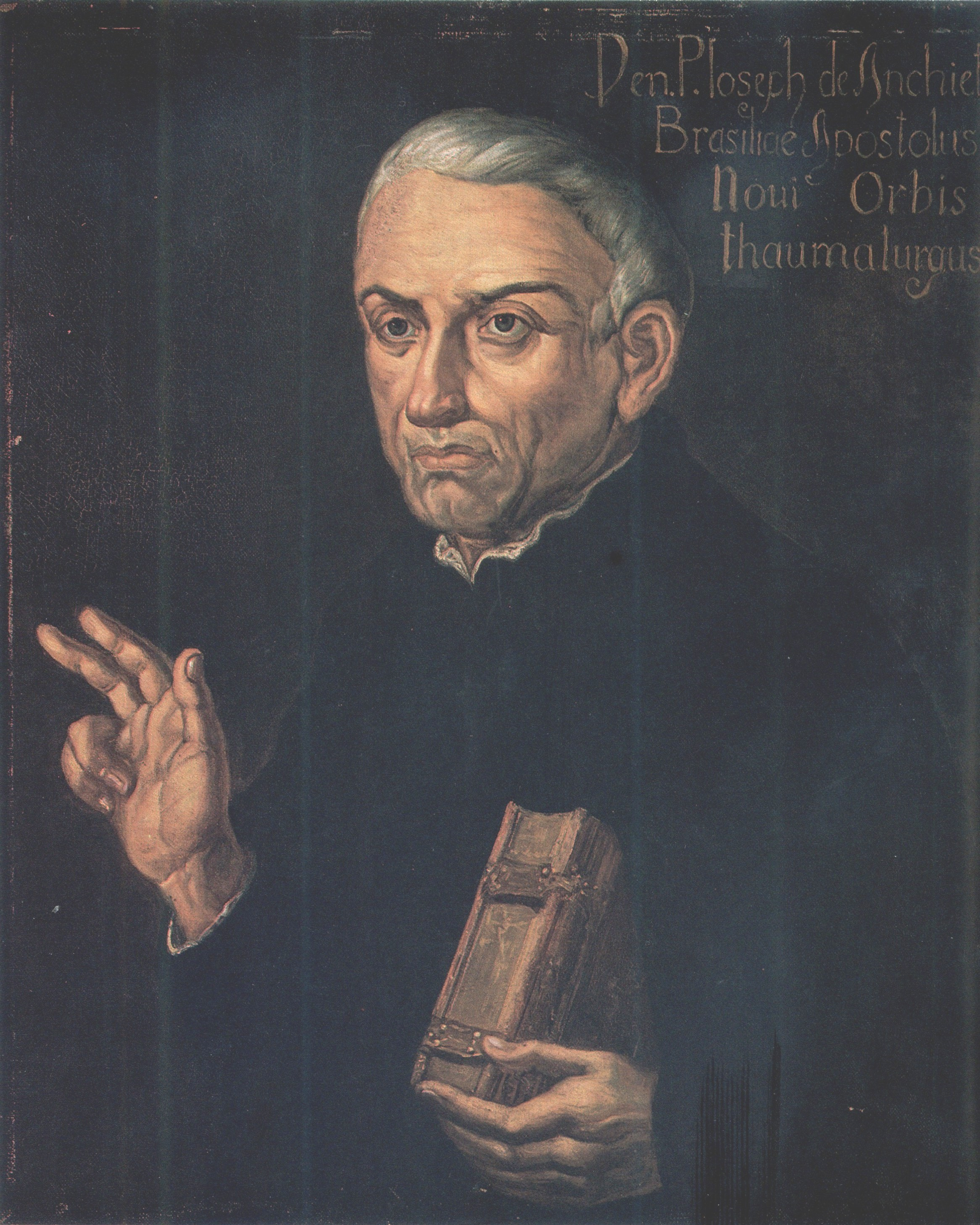
Saint José de Anchieta

The Diocese of Tenerife has saints, blesseds, venerables and servants of God of popular devotion, among them:

- Saints:
  - Peter of Saint Joseph Betancur (1626–1667), missionary in Guatemala and first saint of the Canary Islands.
  - José de Anchieta (1534–1597), saint and missionary in Brazil.
- Blesseds:
  - Martyrs of Tazacorte. In various parts of Portugal and Spain – (deceased in 1570). Monks and missionaries martyred off the coast of La Palma where they enjoy great veneration especially in Tazacorte, although none of them were themselves born in the Canary Islands it has included among the blessed of the archipelago.
  - José Torres Padilla (1811–1878). Religious.
- Venerables and Servants of God:
  - María de León Bello y Delgado (1643–1731), nun and mystic, whose body remains incorrupt.
  - Fray Juan de Jesús (1615–1687), Franciscan friar.
  - Sister María de San Antonio Lorenzo y Fuentes (1665–1741), Dominican nun.
  - Sister María Justa de Jesús (1667–1723), Franciscan nun and mystic.

== See also ==
- Roman Catholicism in Spain
