= Domingo Pérez Cáceres =

Spanish ecclesiastic

The Most Reverend Domingo Pérez Cáceres
- Bishop of Roman Catholic Diocese of San Cristóbal de La Laguna
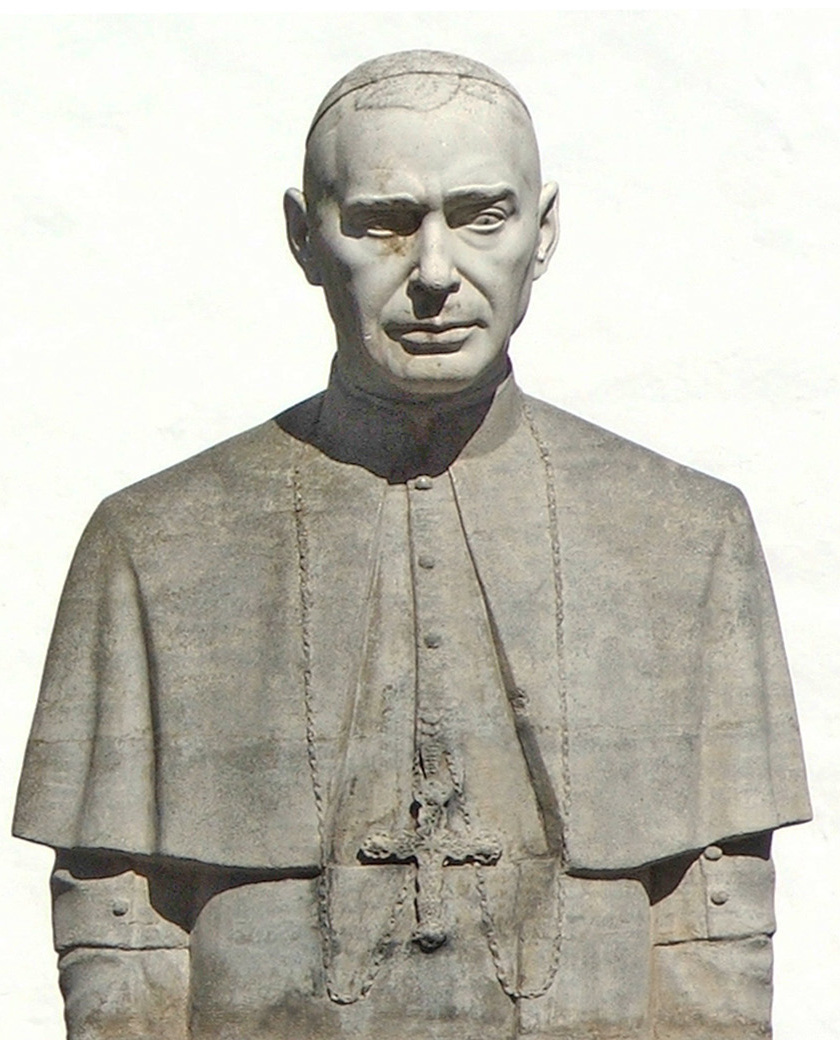
- Bust of Domingo Pérez Cáceres in the plaza of the Cathedral of La Laguna.
- Church: Roman Catholic Church
- See: Roman Catholic Diocese of San Cristóbal de La Laguna or Diocese of Tenerife
- In office: 1947-1961
- Predecessor: Albino González y Menéndez Reigada
- Successor: Luis Franco Cascón
- Previous post: Priest

Personal details
- Born: November 10, 1892 Güímar, Tenerife-Spain
- Died: August 1, 1961 (aged 68) San Cristóbal de La Laguna, Tenerife, Spain

Tomb in the Basilica of Candelaria

Domingo Pérez Cáceres (November 10, 1892, Güímar, Tenerife, Canary Islands, Spain – August 1, 1961, San Cristóbal de La Laguna, Tenerife) was a Spanish ecclesiastic, eighth Bishop of the Roman Catholic Diocese of San Cristóbal de La Laguna. Was one of the most prominent bishops in the history of the Canary Islands, being well known for their aid to poor people in Canary Islands (it was known as the "bishop of the poor"), who gave money, and for his many positions in the Catholic Church.

But above all it is known to be the driving force behind the construction of the Basilica of Our Lady of Candelaria, patron saint of the Canary Islands. He was also the first and only bishop born in Tenerife that ruled his own native diocese, the Diocese of San Cristóbal de La Laguna, also called Diocese of Tenerife or Diocese Nivariense and overall it was also the first canary bishop in governing the diocese also Canarian.

== Biography ==
He was born on November 10, 1892, in Güímar (Tenerife). After studying at the Seminary priestly of Tenerife, he had many important positions, including the rector of the town of Güímar and dean of the Cathedral of La Laguna.

On 21 September 1916 Bishop Nicolás Rey y Redondo gave the order of presbyter, which led him to hold the office of vicar general of the diocese, which he held for twelve years. On September 21, 1947, Don Domingo was consecrated Bishop of Tenerife by Pope Pius XII. It was the eighth bishop of Tenerife.

It was subsequently named Hijo Predilecto of Güímar and the province of Santa Cruz de Tenerife. He was also named adoptive son of the municipalities of the diocese of San Cristóbal de La Laguna, and adopted son of Los Realejos in the same year.

Pérez Cáceres died on August 1, 1961. hundreds of telegrams were sent in the Canary Islands and even from other parts of Spain. He was buried in the Basilica of Candelaria.
