= Villavaler =

Coordinates: 43.484444°N 6.193333°W

Villavaler is one of fifteen parishes (administrative divisions) in Pravia, a municipality within the province and autonomous community of Asturias, in northern Spain.

The population is 117 (INE 2011).

== Villages and hamlets ==
- Carceda
- Lomparte (Llomparti)
- Omedas (Umedas)
- Palación
- Perriella
- San Bartolomé (San Bartuelu)
- Sangreña
- Valdidiello (Valdidiellu)
