= La Opinión de Tenerife =

Spanish Newspaper

- Type: Daily newspaper
- Format: Tabloid
- Owner: Prensa Ibérica
- Publisher: Prensa Ibérica
- Founded: 11 September 1999
- Language: Spanish
- Headquarters: Calle Puente Serrador, Santa Cruz de Tenerife
- Website: laopinion.es

La Opinión de Tenerife was a newspaper of the province of Santa Cruz de Tenerife (Canary Islands, Spain).

== History and profile ==
La Opinión de Tenerife was launched online on 11 September 1999 and distributed in print kiosks just ten days later, on 21 September 1999. It has its editorial and administrative offices in Santa Cruz de Tenerife and is printed in the workshops of San Cristóbal de La Laguna.

It was one of the first newspaper to be directed by a woman, Carmen Ruano.
