= Weeping statue =

Purported supernatural phenomenon

A weeping statue is a statue which has been claimed to have shed tears or to be weeping by supernatural means. Statues weeping tears which appear to be blood, oil, and scented liquids have all been reported. Other claimed phenomena are sometimes associated with weeping statues such as miraculous healing, the formation of figures in the tear lines, and the scent of roses. These events are generally reported by Catholics, and initially attract pilgrims, but are in most cases disallowed by the Church as proven hoaxes.

== Weeping statue and Marian apparition ==
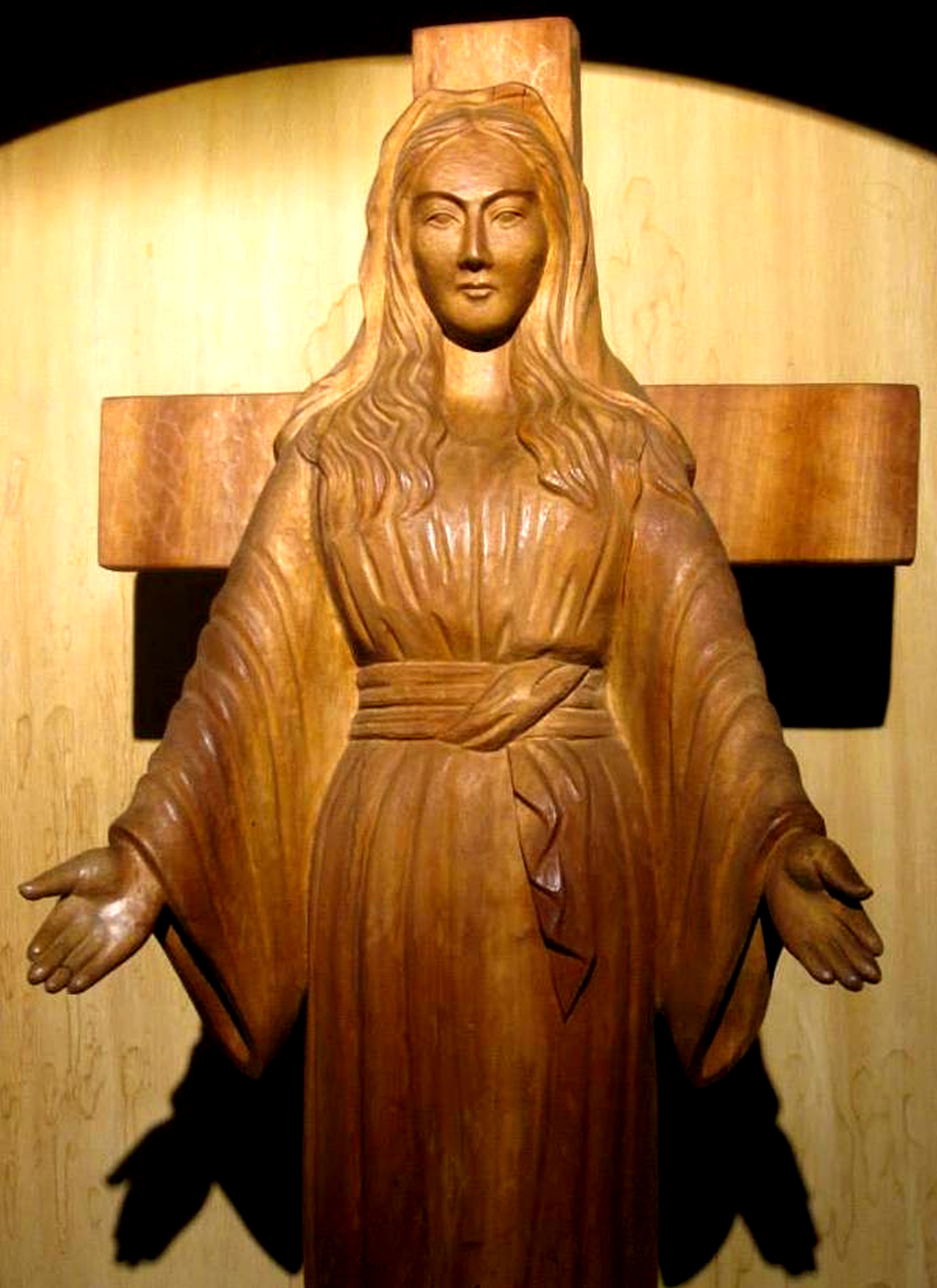
The weeping statue of the apparitions of Our Lady of Akita in Japan.

Reported weeping statues are most often sculptures of the Virgin Mary and are at times accompanied by claims of Marian apparitions. A notable example is the nature of the Our Lady of Akita apparitions that was unlike other cases, as the entire nation of Japan was supposedly able to view the statue of the Virgin Mary shed tears on national television.

== Hoaxes and skepticism ==
Authorities of the Catholic Church have been very careful in their approach and treatment of weeping statues, and generally set very high barriers for their acceptance. For instance, when a statue of the popular Saint Padre Pio of Pietrelcina in Messina, Sicily, was found to have tears of blood one day in 2002, Church officials quickly ordered tests that showed the blood belonged to a woman and then dismissed the case as a hoax.

Weeping statues have also been dismissed by rationalists as a purely psychological and/or fraudulent phenomenon. The witnesses are said to be deluded by their own state of mind or strong group suggestion. In this altered state of mind, they believe they see something that is not really there.

Skeptics point to the fact that making a fake weeping statue is relatively easy. Liquids can be injected into the porous material of statues and later seep out as “tears.” Oil that is mixed with fat can be applied to a statue’s eyes, which will “weep” when ambient temperatures rise in the chapel. Skeptics have provided examples of weeping statues that have been obvious hoaxes.

Another likely explanation attributes the so-called tears to condensation. The tears that statues appear to weep are actually beads of condensation accounted for by the statue being made from material of varying density, with condensation forming on the denser (colder) pieces (in this case the eyes).

A number of weeping statues have been declared fake by Church officials.

In 1985, a statue in Montreal was reported to be weeping and bleeding, but it was discovered that the statue was smeared with the owner's blood and shaving cream.

In 1995, a statue of Mary appeared to weep blood in the town of Civitavecchia in Italy and some 60 witnesses testified to the phenomenon including Girolamo Grillo, Bishop of Civitavecchia-Tarquinia. The blood on the statue was later found to be male, and the statue's owner, Fabio Gregori, refused to take a DNA test. After the Civitavecchia incident, dozens of reputedly miraculous statues were reported. Almost all were shown to be hoaxes, where blood, red paint, or water was splashed on the faces of the statues.

In 2008, church custodian Vincenzo Di Costanzo went on trial in northern Italy for faking blood on a statue of the Virgin Mary, after his own DNA was matched to the purported blood.

Another case in 2012 involved a "weeping" statue of Jesus which was used as holy water. It was later discovered that the cause was by a sewage pipe which filtered through, and began dripping from the statue’s feet.

In 2018, a Mary statue was reported to be producing tears at Our Lady Guadalupe Catholic Church in Hobbs, New Mexico. In July of that year, the Diocese of Las Cruces revealed tests confirmed the tears in fact had the chemical composition of rose-scented olive oil.

== List of weeping statues ==
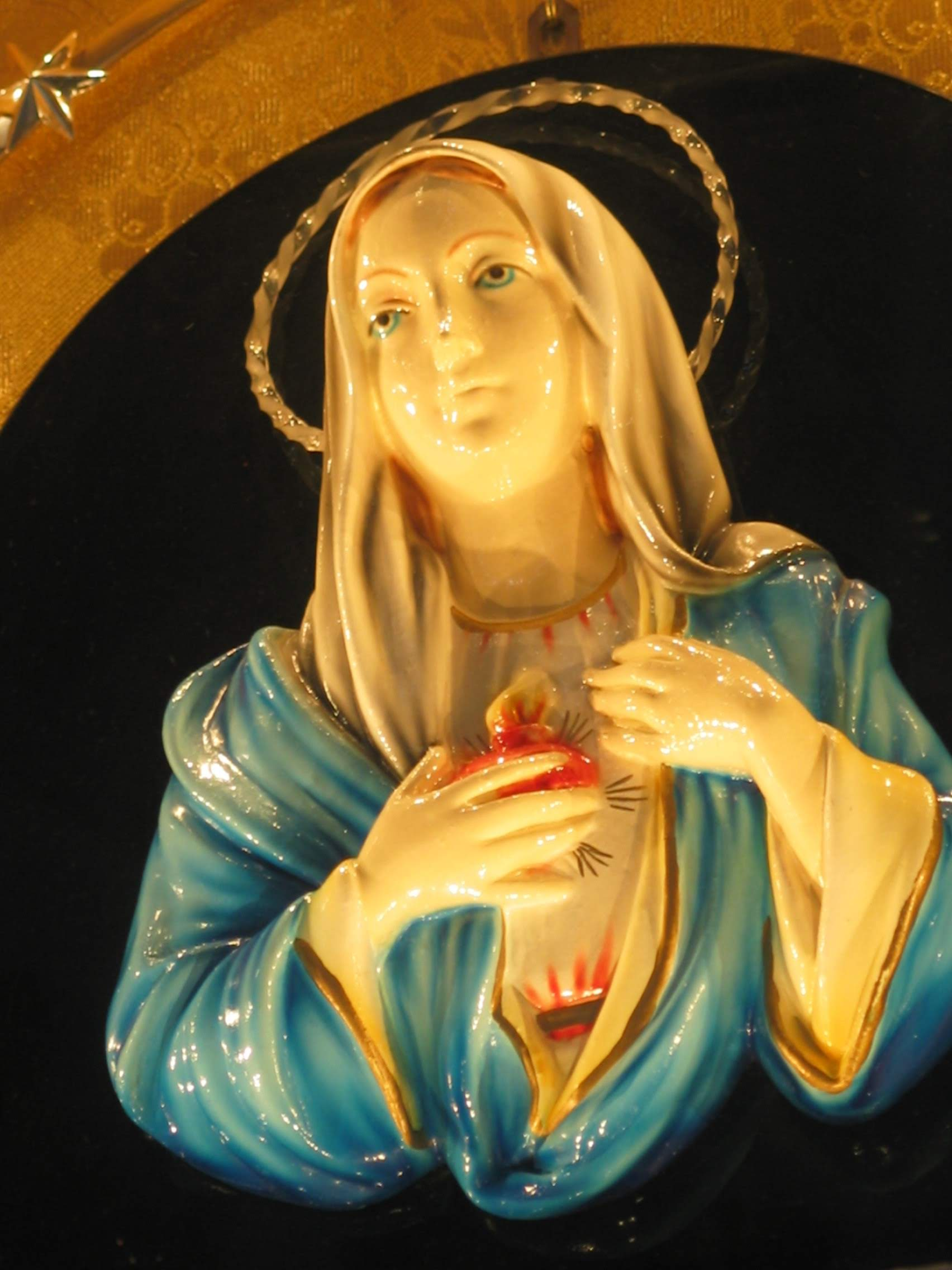
The miraculous weeping statue of the Virgin Mary in Syracuse

In the Book of Daniel Chapter 14 verses 1–21 the story finds Daniel setting up a trap to catch priests who were sneaking into temples to eat the offerings left at the feet of the idol Bel, which was worshipped for its seeming ability to consume food and drink. Plutarch, in chapter 38 of his Life of Coriolanus, discusses the phenomenon of weeping and bleeding statues, with special reference to the case of a statue of Fortuna addressing a crowd in Rome.

According to Joe Nickell, "animated ones", or inanimate objects that are claimed to do things such as walking, changing facial expressions, or shedding tears, are most commonly statues in the Roman Catholic tradition.

A very small number of weeping statues have been recognized by the Catholic Church. In Syracuse, the shedding of tears from a Virgin Mary statue in the house of a married couple (29 August 1953) was recognized by the Archbishop of Siracusa on 13 December 1953. Chemist Luigi Garlaschelli of the University of Pavia, who has not examined the statue kept behind glass, theorizes the tears are due to capillary attraction with moisture seeping through a fault in the glaze of the plaster statue.

The following is a list of more publicized claims. The veracity of these claims is difficult to establish and many have been declared hoaxes by Church officials.

Date	Location	Claims	Reference
10 and 25 November 1643	Rottweil, Germany	Our Lady of the Turning Eyes – tears, changing complexion, speaking, moving head from heaven to earth. Witnessed by at least 42 citizens.	
1953	Syracuse, Sicily, Italy	Image shedding human tears – approved by local bishops	
16 March 1960	Hempstead, New York, United States	Icon of the Sorrowful Theotokos, first shedding human tears in Island Park, New York, at the house of Peter and Pagona Catsounis. Brought to a priest at St. Paul Greek Orthodox Cathedral, later considered to be a "Sign of Divine Providence" by the Ecumenical Patriarchate.	
November 1983	Rmaish, Lebanon	Statue of the Virgin Mary, sheds blood and oil.	
April 1992	Lake Ridge, Virginia, United States	Catholic associate pastor is claimed to cause statues of the Virgin Mary to weep tears or blood.	
1980	Pavia, Italy	Statue claimed to weep real tears, shown to be fraudulent as owner applied the tears with a water gun.	
February 1995	Civitavecchia, Italy	Statue of Our Lady, bought in Medjugorje, reportedly shed tears of blood, disproven	
April 1997 till present	Platina, Brazil	Statue of Our Lady of the Sacred Heart sheds a red liquid – unverified	
March 2002	Messina, Italy	Statue of Pio of Pietrelcina shed a red liquid, rejected by the Vatican	
September 2002	Rockingham, Australia	Wept scented tears, apparitions, accepted.	
February 2003	Chittagong, Bangladesh	unverified	
September 2004	Baalbek, Lebanon	Appearance of scented oil, blinked and claimed a cure – unverified	
November 2005	Sacramento, California, United States	Shed tears of blood, called a hoax on the Paula Zahn TV show	
March 2006 onwards	Kerala, India	tears of blood, appearance of oil, honey, milk – unverified	
January 2006 till present	Borġ in-Nadur, Birżebbuġa, Malta	tears of blood, appearance of oil, salt – unverified, self-published claims	
November 2010	Windsor, Ontario, Canada	appearance of oil, "smiles during the day" and exuded oil claimed to heal – (see the article Windsor, Ontario weeping statue)	
July 2012	Baton Rouge, Louisiana, United States	appearance of dripping blood from hairline	
October 2012	Tanauan, Batangas, Philippines	appearance of blood in face, and excretes oil in palm in the statue of Mary, Mediatrix of All Grace, the blood revealed to be human and Type O. It is also reported that several Marian images also weep blood in their home – currently under investigation by the Archdiocese of Lipa	
May 2015	Barangay Liloan, Catarman, Camiguin, Philippines	Traces of alleged blood were found near the eyes of an image of Mary inside the Our Lady of Lourdes Chapel one Tuesday morning, local residents said. Residents were also surprised to see that the image's hands were unclasped. Church administrators have yet to determine whether the image really cried blood.	
March 2016	Trevignano, Lazio, Italy	The statue of the Virgin Mary is reported to weep blood every third day of the month, but in 2026 it was declared fake by the Vatican.	
August 2018	Pásztó, Hungary	Realistic human tears dripping down for more than 3 months, with additional red circles around eyes. Source not yet determined.	
July and September 2018	Hobbs, New Mexico, United States	Our Lady of Guadalupe weeping tears of olive oil. Currently under investigation by the Diocese of Las Cruces.	
August 2020	Carmiano, Apulia, Italy	The statue of the Virgin Mary would have oozed a reddish liquid	

== Weeping paintings ==
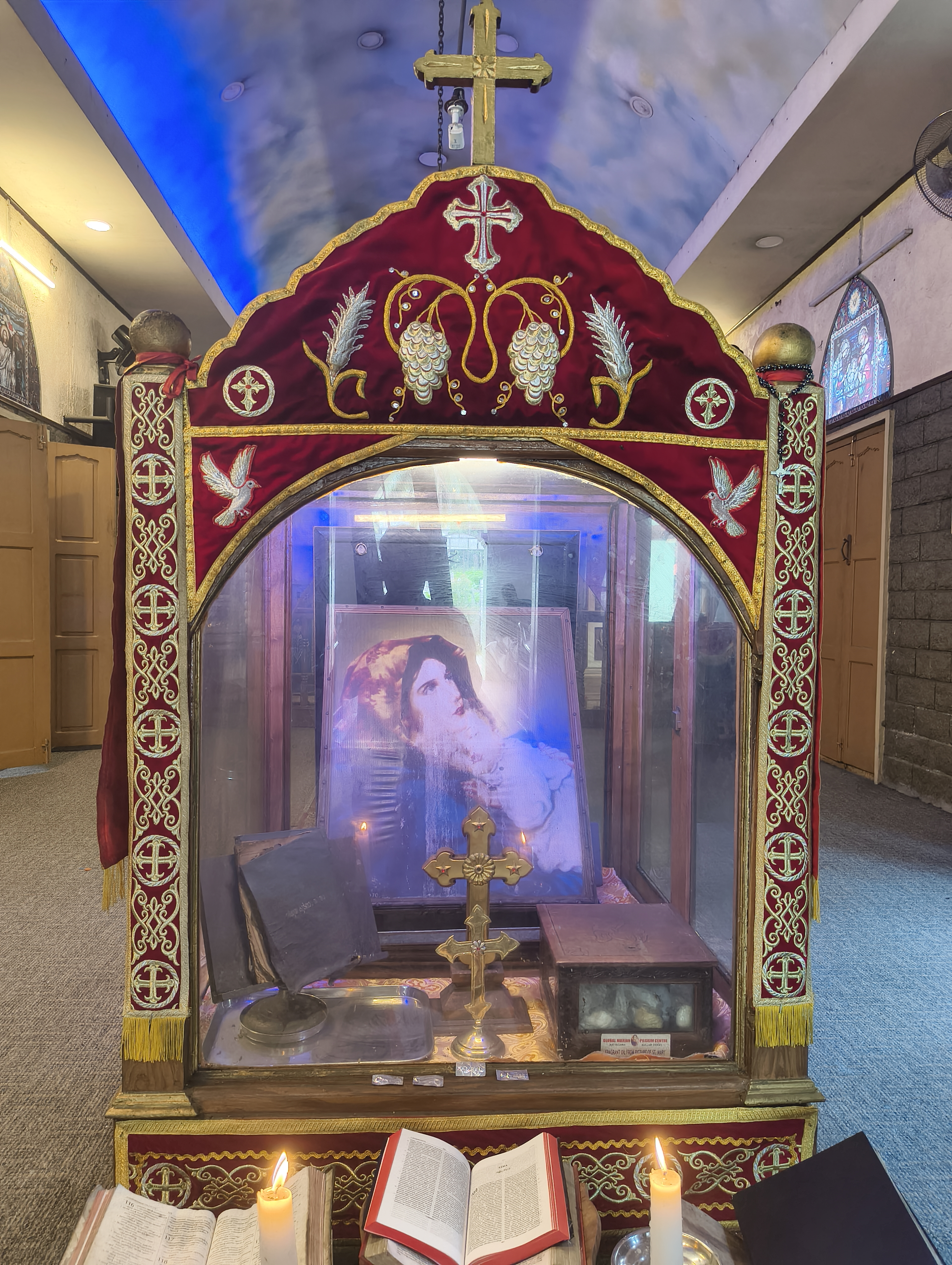
Weeping icon, Prayer book, Holy cross and Aromatic oil (Kattachira Church) of Syriac Orthodox Church in India

Weeping paintings or icons are a related phenomenon, but to date not a single case of a weeping painting has been approved either by the Roman Catholic or Coptic churches and most instances have turned out to be hoaxes. However, in Eastern Orthodoxy, some cases such as a weeping St Michael icon in Rhodes have been taken as miraculous.

As with weeping statues, the tears exuded are often said to be of a substance which appears to be similar to blood. A painting of the Virgin Mary is said to have exuded moisture from the eyes and the fingers at St. Nicholas Albanian Orthodox Church in Chicago on 6 December 1986. The event gained international attention and drew many onlookers to the church. The moisture ceased in July 1987, but resumed a year later at which time 19 other icons were said to have also started weeping after being "anointed" with the painting's moisture. Church authorities refused to allow the "tears" to be analysed by chemists. A painting of Mary on plywood was said to have wept on 10 March 1992 in Barberton, Ohio; annual pilgrimages celebrating the event were still in practice as late as 2002. Another painting of the Virgin Mary which drew many visitors to Christ of the Hills Monastery near Blanco, Texas in the 1980s was said to weep myrrh, but was uncovered as a fraud in the 2000s.

== Other similar phenomena ==
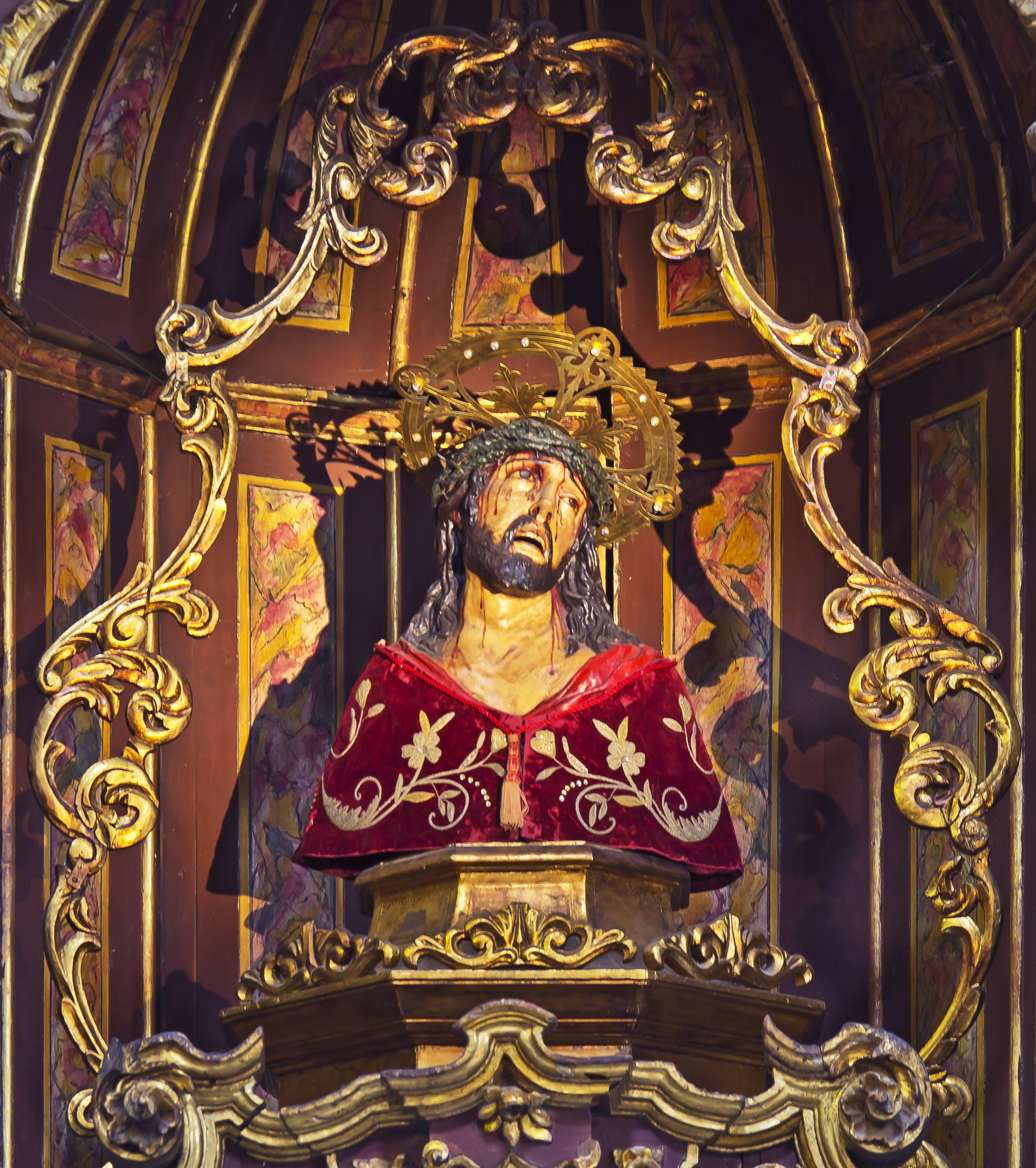
Image of the Señor de las Tribulaciones in Santa Cruz de Tenerife, a figure to whom a "miraculous sweating" was attributed in 1795.

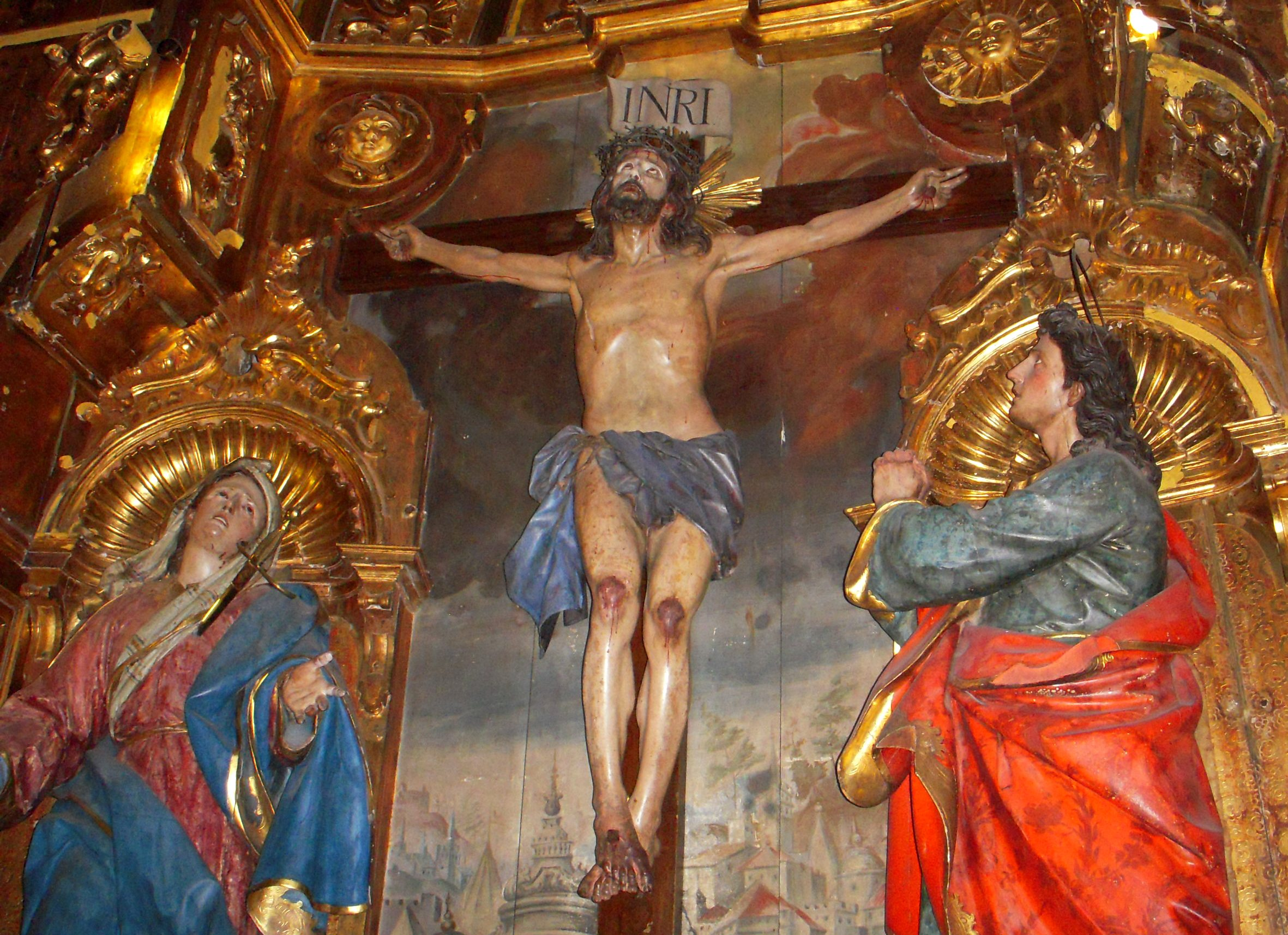
Image of the Holy Christ of the Agony in Limpias, Spain, which flowed real blood.

In addition to the shedding of tears, throughout history there have been reports of religious images that have emitted similar or related phenomena, such as "sweating" phenomena, or the emanation of oil, blood, water, or other substances, including honey.

A particularly famous case of its time was the phenomenon that occurred in the spring of 1795 in Santa Cruz de Tenerife (Spain). A representation of a bust of Jesus Christ, locally invoked as the Señor de las Tribulaciones, who began to "sweat" when he was transferred to the home of a wealthy family in the city to cure the family matriarch of an illness.

Another similar case of "miraculous sweating" that also occurred on the Spanish island of Tenerife is that of the picture or painting of Saint John the Evangelist venerated in the parish church of La Concepción de San Cristóbal de La Laguna. The phenomenon occurred during an epidemic of bubonic plague that hit the island in 1648.

More recent cases include; an image of Christ crucified in Tucumán, Argentina, which flowed a reddish liquid, identified as blood, through the Five Holy Wounds in 2011, or the case in Brazil, of an image of the Virgin of Fátima that exudes oil and honey from 1993 to the present.

== See also ==
- Liquefying blood relics
- Marian apparition
- Milk Miracle
- Moving statues
- Our Lady of Soufanieh
- Perceptions of religious imagery in natural phenomena
