= Iglesia de la Concepción =

Iglesia de la Concepción may refer to:

- Iglesia de la Concepción (Santa Cruz de Tenerife)
- Iglesia de la Concepción (San Cristóbal de La Laguna)
