= Iglesia de San Francisco de Asís (Santa Cruz de Tenerife) =

Church in Santa Cruz de Tenerife, Spain

Coordinates: 28°28′05″N 16°14′58″W

Church of Saint Francis of Assisi
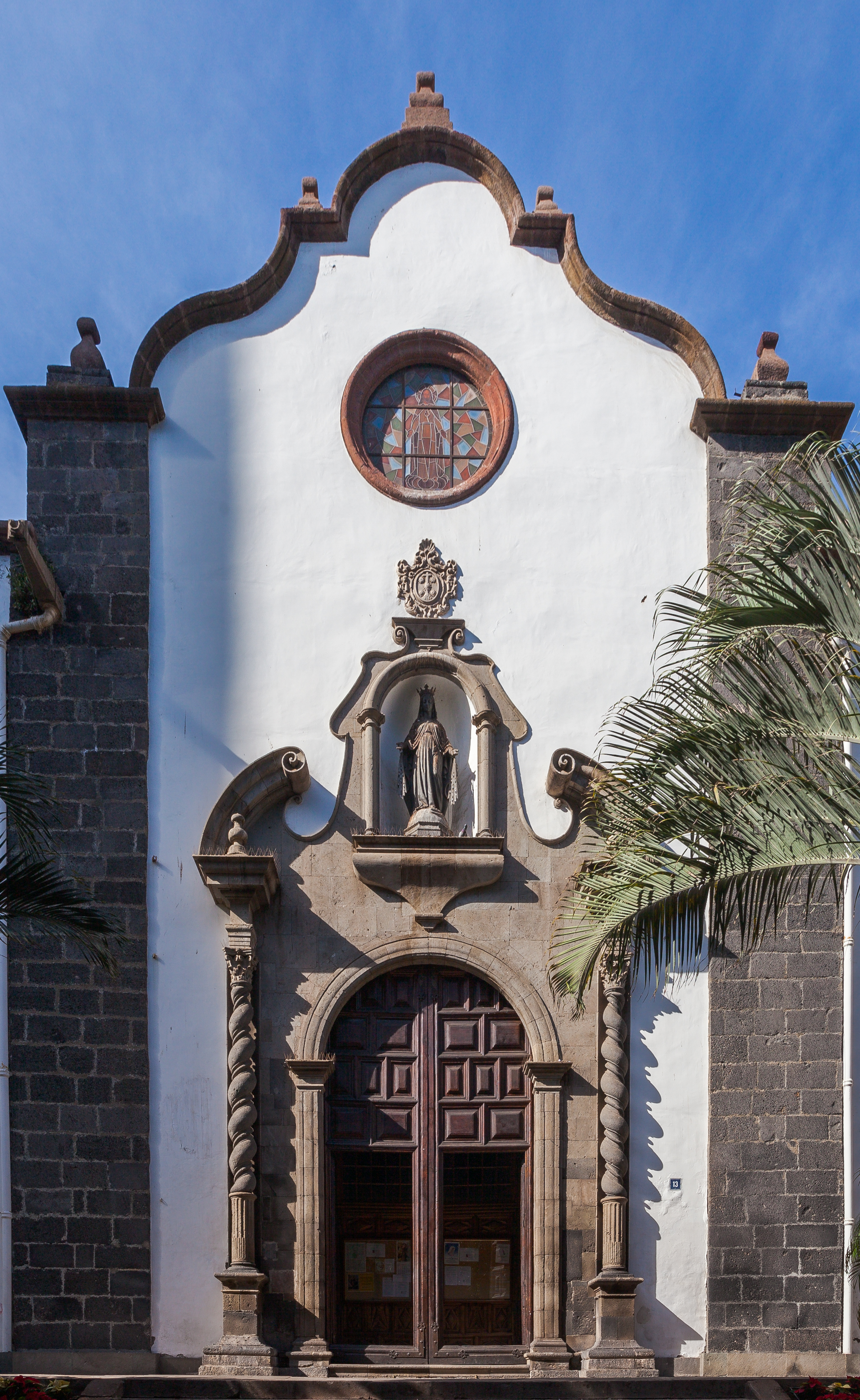
- Façade

Religion
- Affiliation: Roman Catholic
- Diocese: Diocese of San Cristóbal de La Laguna
- Province: Archdiocese of Seville
- Ecclesiastical or organisational status: Church

Location
- Location: Santa Cruz de Tenerife, Spain.
- Interactive map of Church of Saint Francis of Assisi

Architecture
- Style: Colonial of the Canary Islands
- Completed: 1680
- Direction of façade: East

The Iglesia de San Francisco de Asís (Church of St. Francis of Assisi) is a Catholic church located in the city of Santa Cruz de Tenerife (Canary Islands, Spain).

This church was originally a Franciscan convent and is now the second most important church of the city, after the Church of the Conception. The present church was completed in 1680 and notable for the large number of works of art he owns. The church has three naves and is one of the best examples of Baroque architecture in the Canary Islands.

Although the church is most famous because it is home to the miraculous image of the Señor de las Tribulaciones, a small picture that represents Jesus Christ, which is famous because after a cholera epidemic and morbidity in 1893, we made a procession with this image through the streets of the city and the epidemic stopped miraculously. For this reason the size is invoked as protector of the city and taking the title of Señor de Santa Cruz.

== Gallery ==
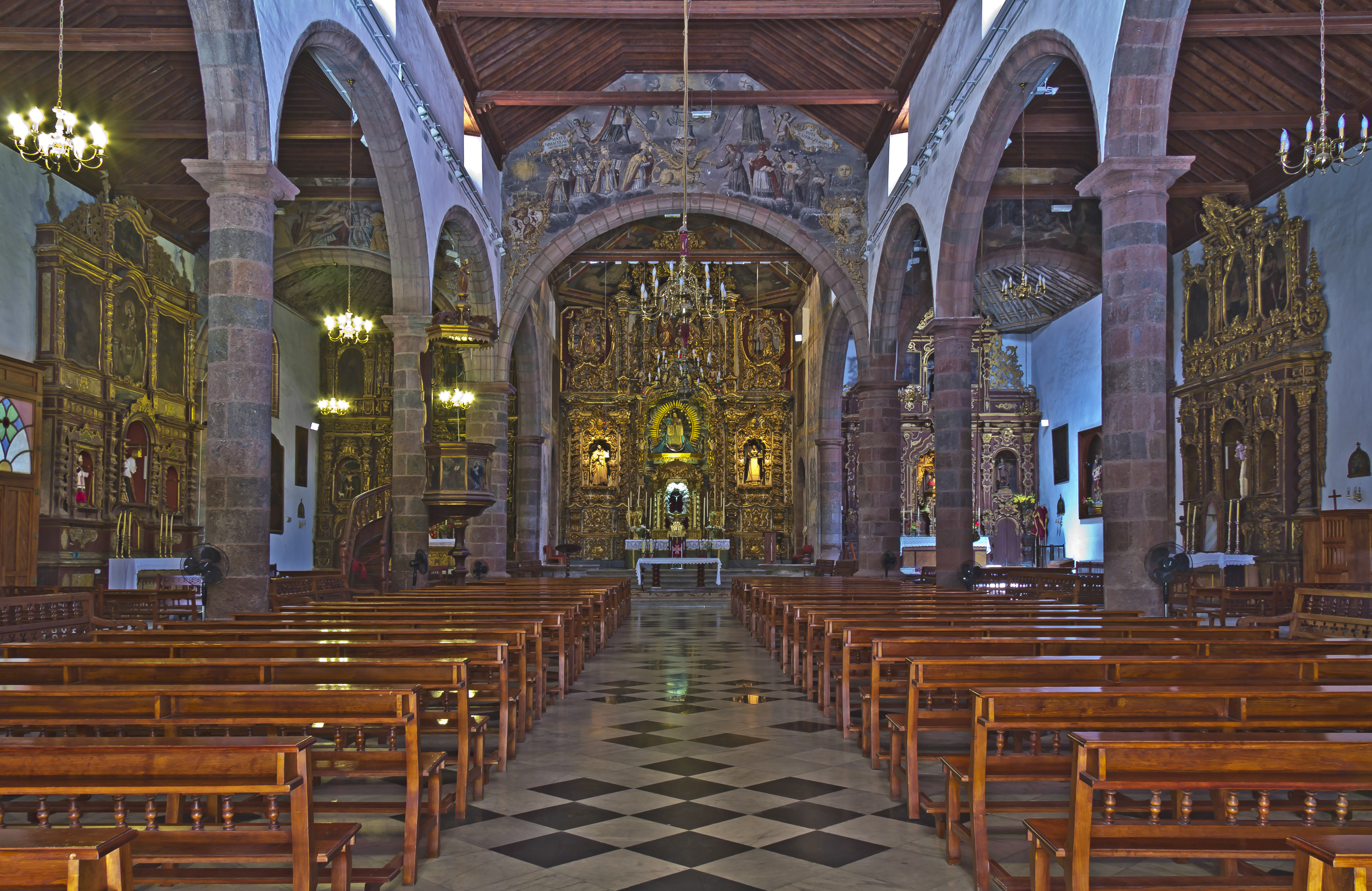
Interior of the church

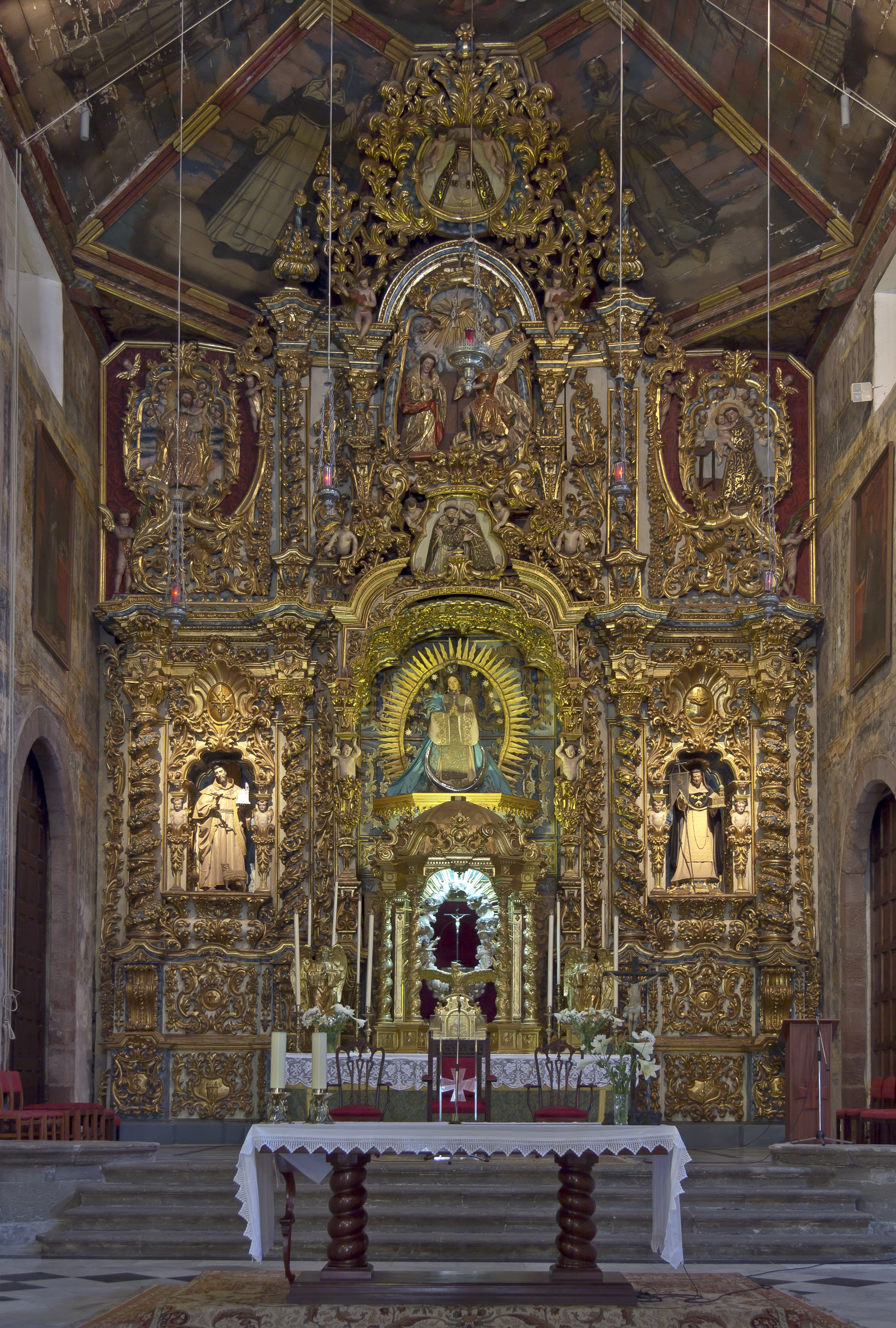
High altar

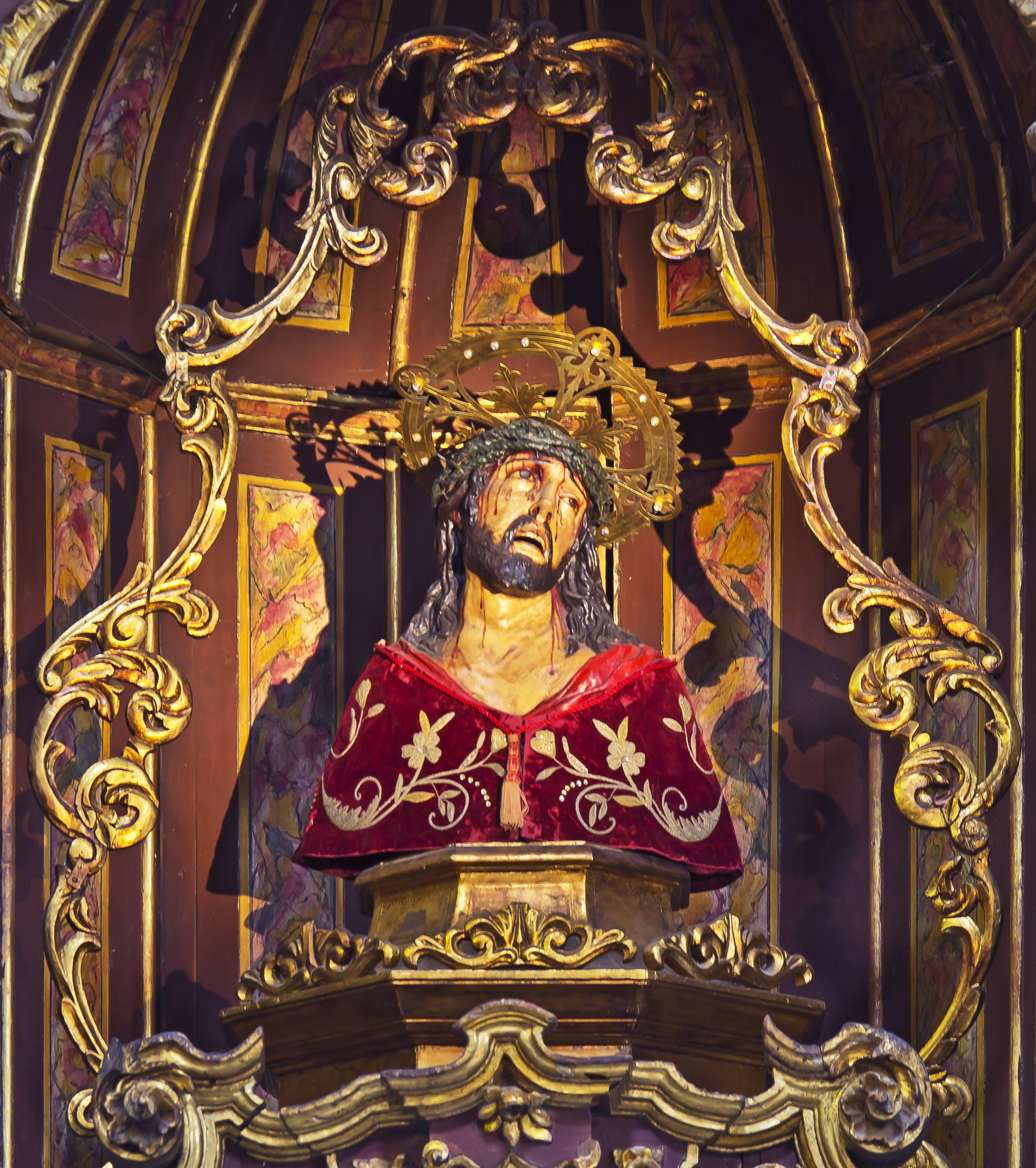
Señor de las Tribulaciones

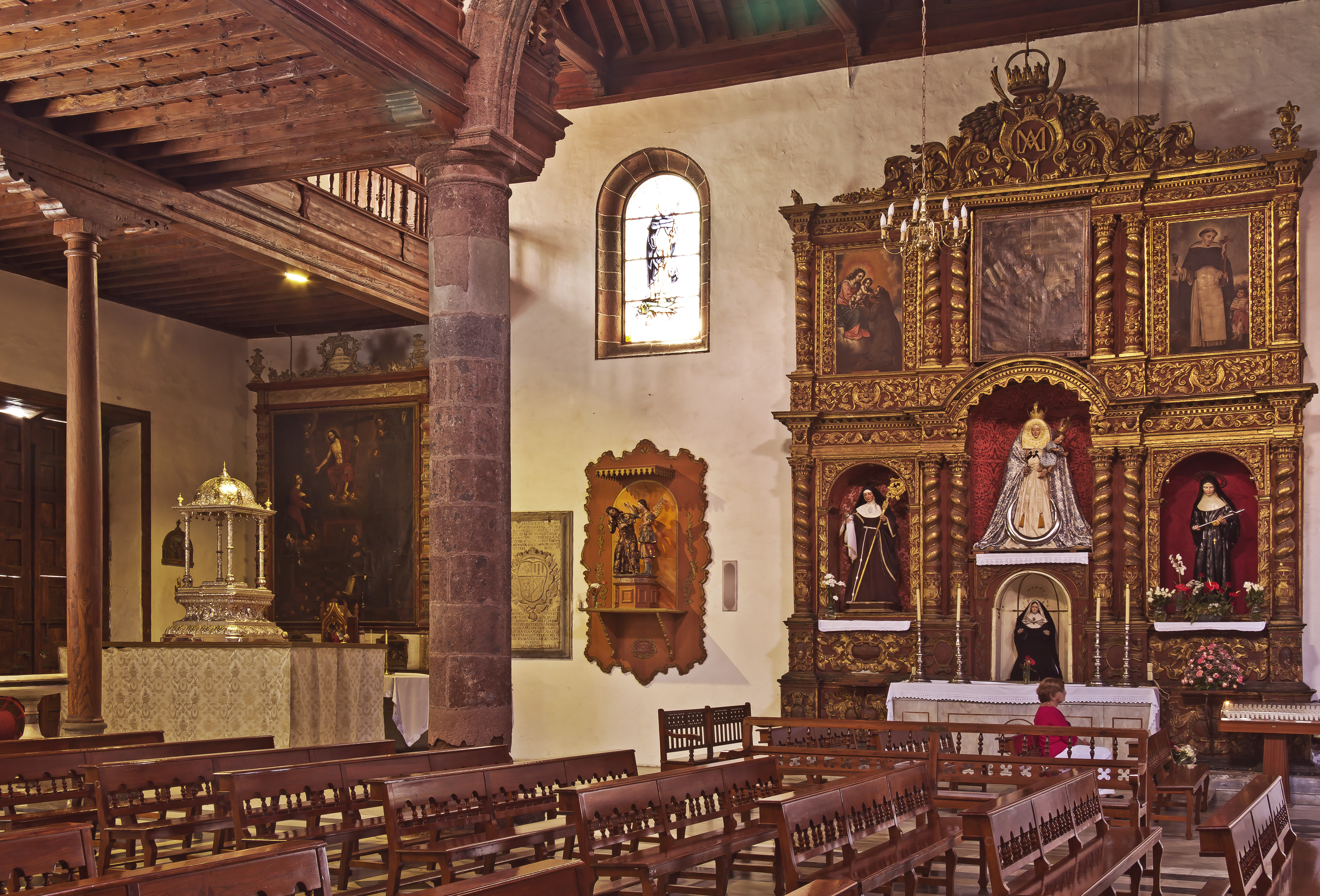
Side nave of the church

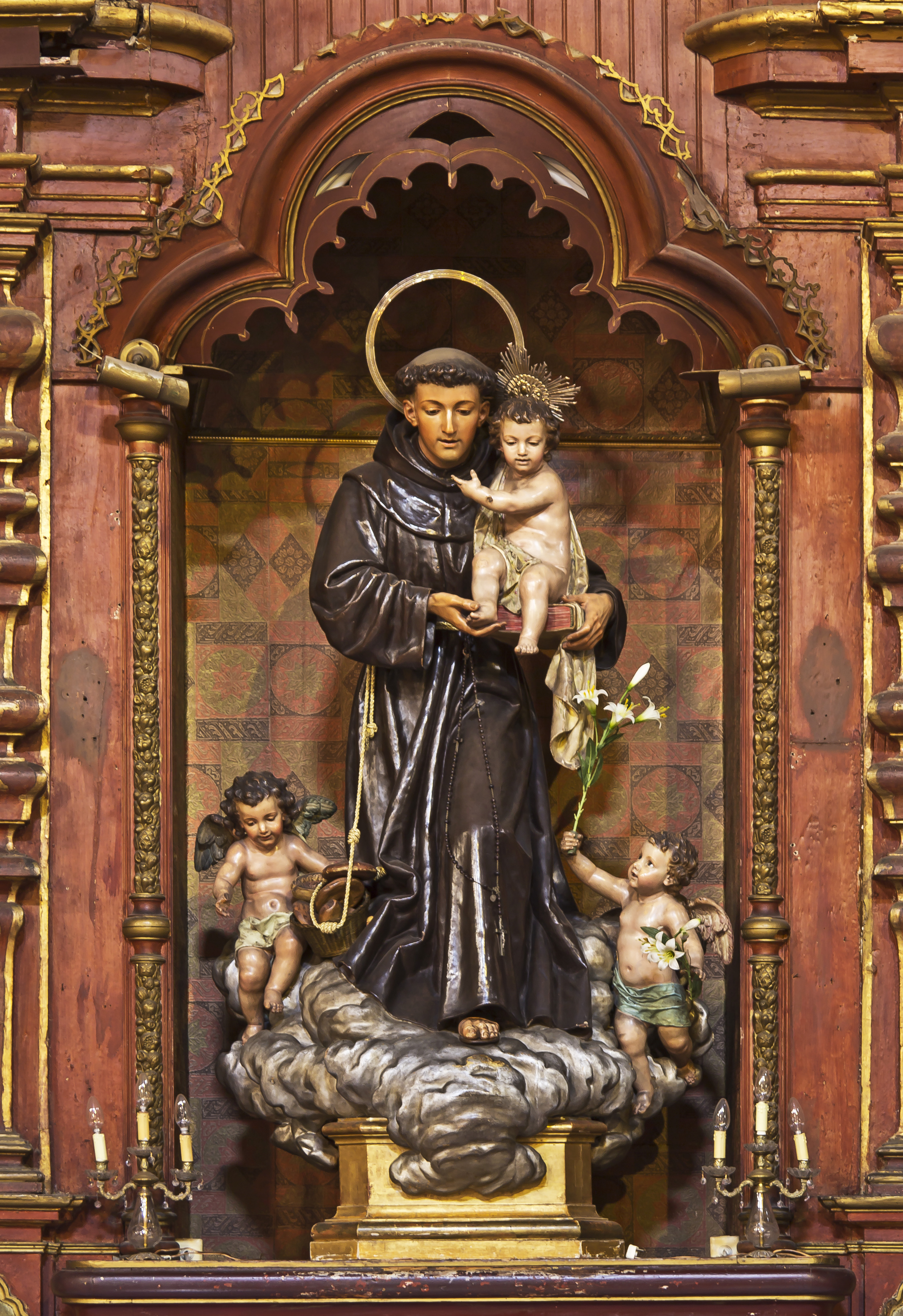
St. Anthony of Padua

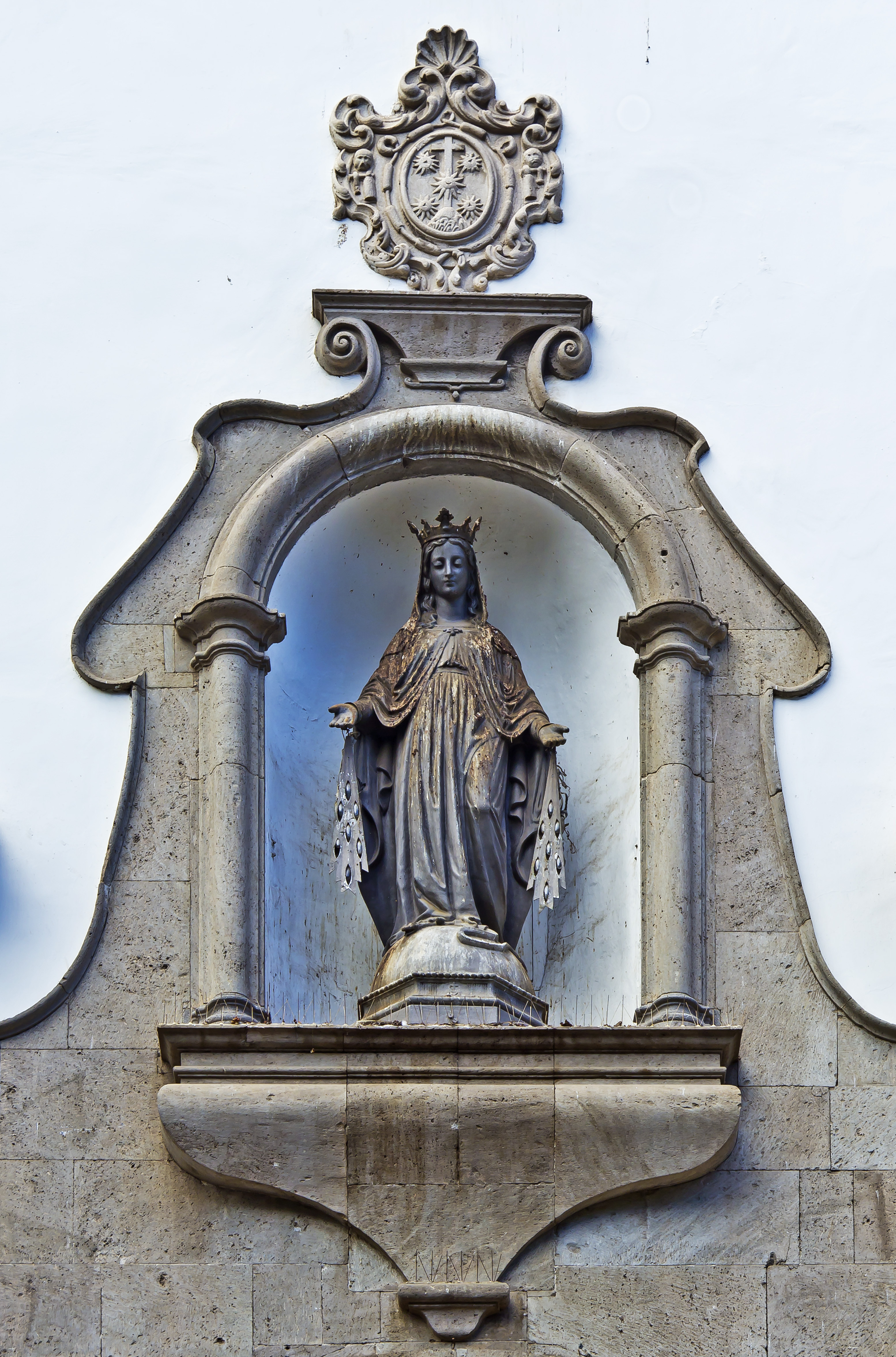
Virgin Mary in the façade of the church (exterior)

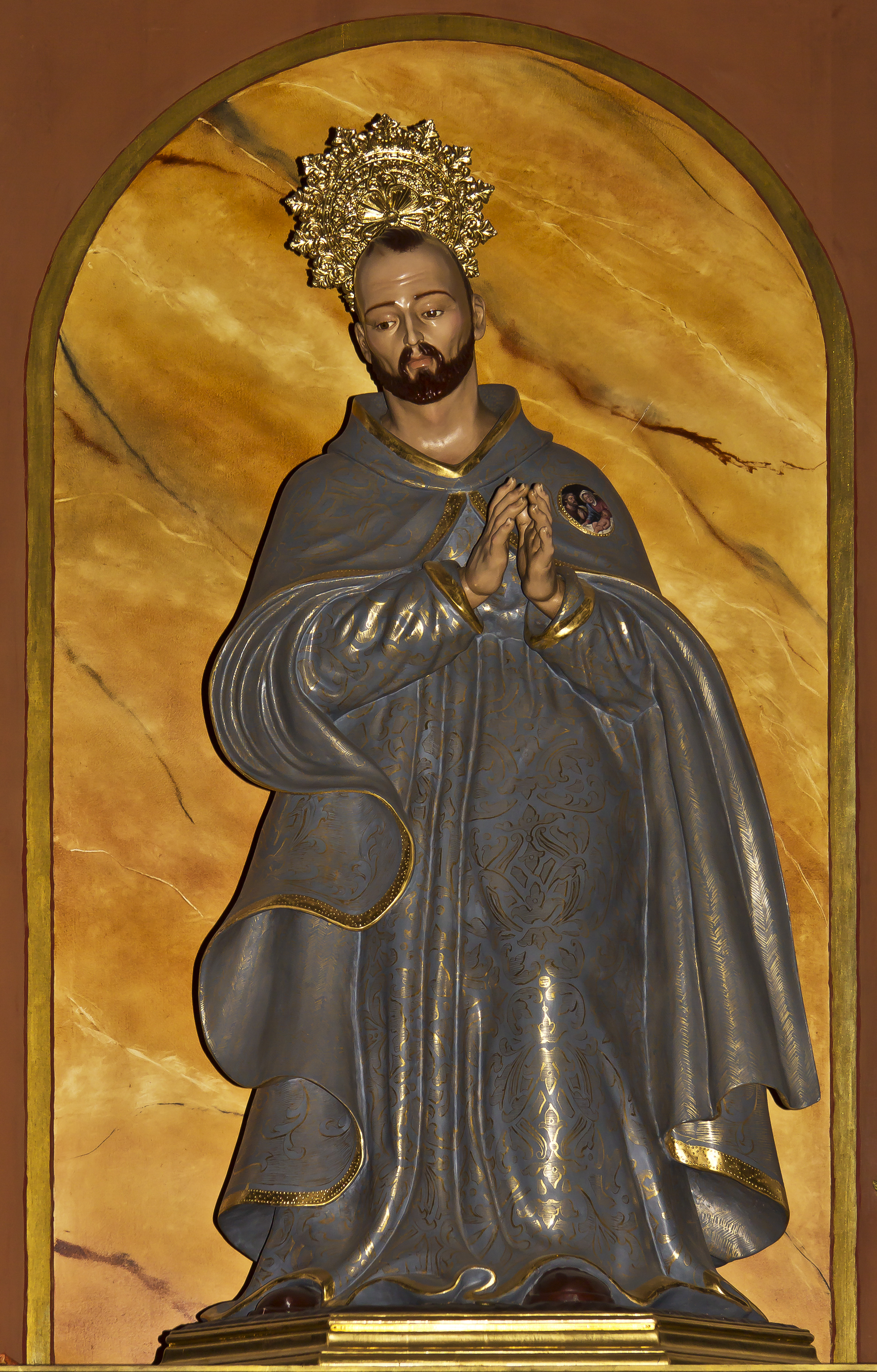
St. Peter of Saint Joseph de Betancur, first canary saint
