= Windsor, Ontario weeping statue =

Alleged 2010 miracles in Canada

In 2010 the Canadian city of Windsor was the site of alleged miracles, centring around a statue of the Virgin Mary.

Fadia Ibrahim, a local Orthodox Christian, claimed to be receiving messages from the Virgin Mary, saying that people must return to church. Ibrahim reported that she was secreting oil from her own hands and that a statue of the Virgin that she owned was weeping tears of oil. In July she placed the statue on a pedestal, enclosed behind glass, in her front garden. This resulted in thousands of visitors arriving there to see the miracle, to receive healing or have their prayers answered. After complaints to municipal authorities from residents, Ibrahim was ordered to remove the statue or acquire a permit. In November she acceded to the city's demands and the statue was placed inside St. Charbel Maronite Catholic Church. Weeping was subsequently reported, but the attention paid to the statue largely died off after it was removed from Ibrahim's lawn.

== Background and early messages ==
Fadia Ibrahim was born in 1962. In 1990 she moved from Lebanon to Canada. At the time of her experiences with the Virgin Mary she was living in Windsor, Ontario with her family. Ibrahim attended the St. Ignatius of Antioch Church, an Orthodox Christian church.

She claimed to have been first visited by the Virgin in 2009, when a bloody M and a cross appeared on Ibrahim's leg during Mass. Mary continued to visit Ibrahim. She left more markings on her body but also spoke to her directly. Mary's message to Ibrahim was that people must invigorate their faith and return to church. Despite the interpretations of some of the pilgrims who visited the shrine, Ibrahim did not report the Virgin giving her a warning of any coming catastrophe. Ibrahim described Mary in the following way: “She's pretty. She keeps smiling. She covers her head. … She's 49, 50 years [old]. … She's like, I don't know how to say, she's different. She's different.”

== Shrine ==
Ibrahim's visions led to people visiting her in her home. In June 2010 a family of Chaldean Catholic Assyrians from Detroit gifted Ibrahim with a four-foot statue of the Virgin. Ibrahim reported that on July 1 her daughter noticed that the statue was weeping oil. Mary then requested Ibrahim to move the statue outside. She did this, putting the statue in an enclosed pedestal on her front lawn. Shortly after the shrine was created, Ibrahim began to report that she was secreting oil from her own hands.

The weeping continued after the shrine was created. It was said that the statue smiled during the day but wept at night. Immediately after the statue was put outside, visitors came to see the alleged miracle, to pray at the sacred space, to have prayers answered or to receive healing. Some of the visitors reported that they had indeed been cured of ailments after praying at the shrine. One woman testified that her teenage granddaughter was cured of leukemia after Ibrahim anointed her with the holy oil: “She just put the oil on her, prayed for her…. The doctor said her blood, everything was normal”. Pilgrims arrived with cotton balls, q-tips and makeup remover to collect these tears of oil. The Mother of God was believed to have been crying out of heartbreak for the state of the world, with some of the pilgrims also inferring an apocalyptic warning.

Ibrahim reportedly felt disappointed at the lack of support she received from the Roman Catholic and Orthodox churches, even though many pilgrims from both of these faiths had visited the shrine. A spokesman for the local Roman Catholic diocese said that “It’s not within our jurisdiction to investigate”, as Ibrahim was Orthodox and that “any investigation that could be done, would be done by the Orthodox Church.” Parishes were advised not to promote the site. A spokesman for the Orthodox Diocese of Windsor issued a statement saying the claims were being “investigated under the watchful eye of our bishop”. Father John Ayoub of St. Ignatius of Antioch Church, the church where Ibrahim worshipped, said that while he did not personally believe the claims, others were free to do so and that Ibrahim remained a beloved parishioner. He also said that he had received several phone calls from supporters of Ibrahim, angry that he had not confirmed her claims.

== Controversy and removal of statue ==
Residents of the neighbourhood where the statue was located were unhappy with the increase in noise and traffic, especially as visitors to it often arrived at night. Many of them decried Ibrahim's claims as a hoax. A petition against the shrine was organized and delivered to city authorities. The city agreed that the structure violated local building codes. The city gave Ibrahim until 19 November to acquire a permit or dismantle the shrine.

Ibrahim initially organised a counter-petition against the decision, but later acceded to the city's demands. On 5 November the statue was placed inside St. Charbel Maronite Catholic Church. Ibrahim had initially offered the statue to her own church of St. Ignatius of Antioch but the pastor declined her offer. Ibrahim reported that she agreed to the city's demands following a request from the Virgin Mary, saying “she told me she wanted people to go back to the church. My house is not a church.” Ibrahim also acknowledged that the controversy had placed a great strain on her family.

Claims of the statue's miraculous properties continued after it was placed inside the church. Father Chaaya said that was not convinced of Ibrahim's claims when he agreed to accept the statue in his church. Once it was inside however, he changed his mind, claiming that during recitation of the rosary on the evening of 13 November, himself and about fifty worshippers saw the statue weeping. Other parishioners and visitors to the church made similar claims. Despite these claims, there has been far less attention paid to the statue since it was moved from Fadia Ibrahim's front lawn.

== See also ==
- Moving statues
