= Our Lady of the Turning Eyes =

Catholic title of the Blessed Virgin Mary associated with a moving and weeping statue

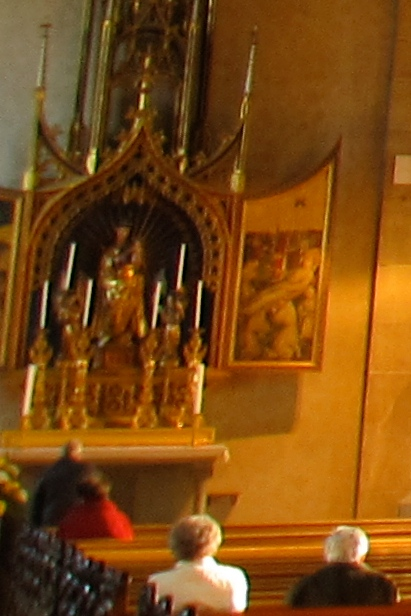
- Statue involved in the Marian apparition, in its altar at Holy Cross Münster
- Location: Rottweil, Baden-Württemberg, Germany
- Date: 10 November and 25 November 1643
- Witness: 42 citizens
- Type: Weeping statue

Our Lady of the Turning Eyes (German: Muttergottes von der Augenwende) is a Catholic title of the Blessed Virgin Mary associated with a moving and weeping statue in Rottweil in present day Baden-Württemberg, Germany. Pilgrims come from Alsace, Lake Constance, and Switzerland, among other places.

== History ==
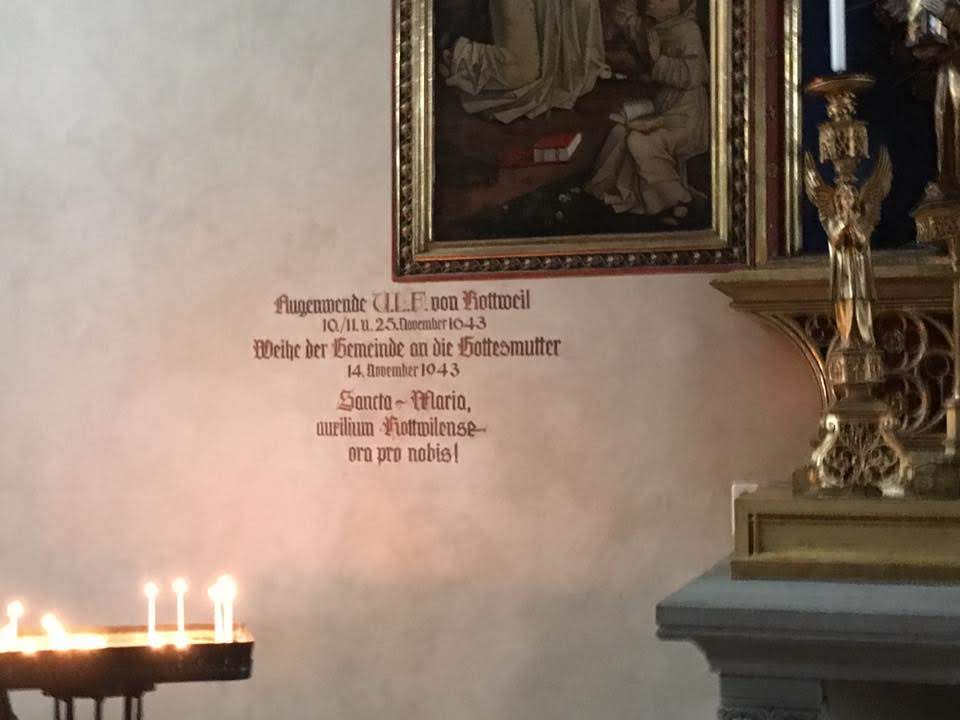
Inscription near the statue's altar

In 1643 the city of Rottweil was under siege by French troops during the Thirty Years' War. As cited in the original Dominican document, 300 citizens of the town ceaselessly prayed the rosary at a statue of the Madonna and Child at the Dominican church. On 10 November 1643 witnesses saw the statue turn pale and raise its eyes toward heaven then back to the city. Some claimed to have heard it speak. Both Catholics and non-Catholics witnessed the event. Fifteen days later, the statue's face turned reddish and the eyes moved again while shedding a few tears. At the same time, the French and Weimaran troops were defeated by Bavarian troops in the Battle of Tuttlingen. The victory was attributed to the intercession of Mary.

The statue remained in the church until 1802 following the secularization of Germany when the monastery was dissolved and the church was seized by the Kingdom of Württemberg. At this time the statue was transferred to the city's main Catholic church, the Holy Cross Münster. A solemn procession was held to relocate the statue on 29 December of that year. The Dominican church later became the town's Protestant church, the Predigerkirche. The statue was loaned back to the former Dominican church temporarily from 5 March 2016 to 24 September 2017 while the Holy Cross Münster was under restoration.
