= Kattachira Church =

Global Marian Pilgrim Center, Kattachira
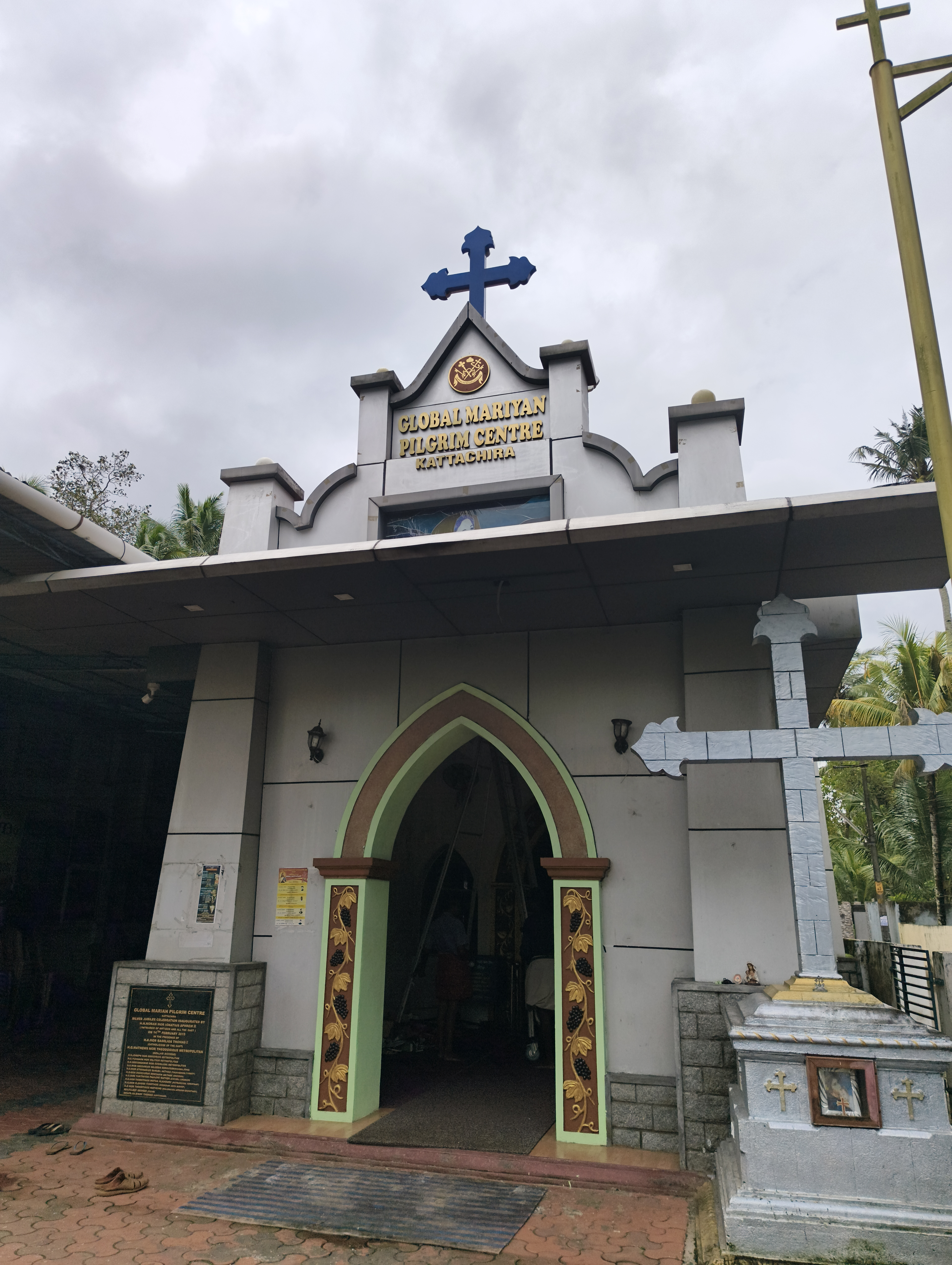
- Kattachira Pilgrim Church
- Location: (India) Bharanikkavu, Kerala
- Denomination: Jacobite Syrian Christian Church
- Tradition: Syriac, Malayalam

History
- Dedication: Saint Mary

Administration
- Diocese: Kollam diocese

Clergy
- Vicar: Roy George

Kattachira is a church in the Kollam Diocese of the Jacobite Syrian Christian Church. In this church, aromatic oil flowed from the Icon of the Mother of God.

== Claimed miracle ==
Since October 21, 2009, aromatic oil resembling tears, has been observed pouring out from the eyes of Saint Mary in a flex photograph placed inside the chapel. It is said that, although this oil is repeatedly wiped away, it continues to flow.

More aromatic oil has been observed emerging from the Holy Qurbono Taksa held in the Altar of Chapel. Similar oil has also been observed flowing from the Cross placed near the photo and the Apostolic Bull of Moran Mor Ignatius Zakka I Iwas.

== History ==
The history of Kattachira Church is as follows. The Malankara Jacobite Syrian believers originally in Kattanam Church, who remained loyal to the Apostolic Throne of Antioch, needed a new place of worship when an issue brought out by the Indian Orthodox occurred at Kattanam parish, leaving it closed.

== Global Marian Pilgrim center ==
The Patriarch Ignatius Zakka I declared the chapel as a Global Marian Pilgrim Centre in November 2009.

== Apostolic visit ==
The Patriarch of the Syriac Orthodox Church of Antioch Ignatius Aphrem II visited the church in February 15, 2015, offered incense prayer, attended a public function and delivered a Holy Speech.

== Gallery ==
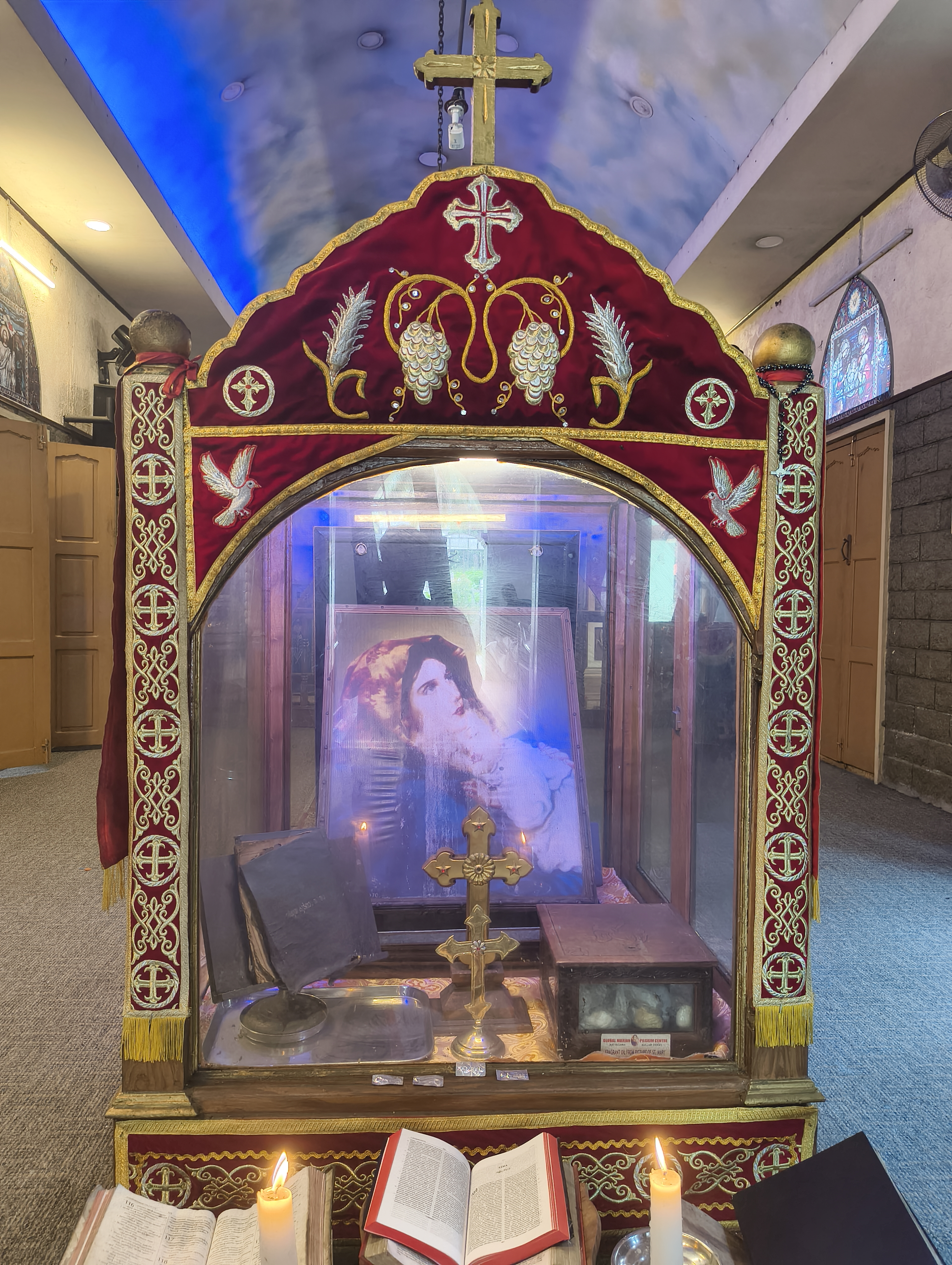
Weeping icon of Virgin Mary, Prayer book and Holy cross

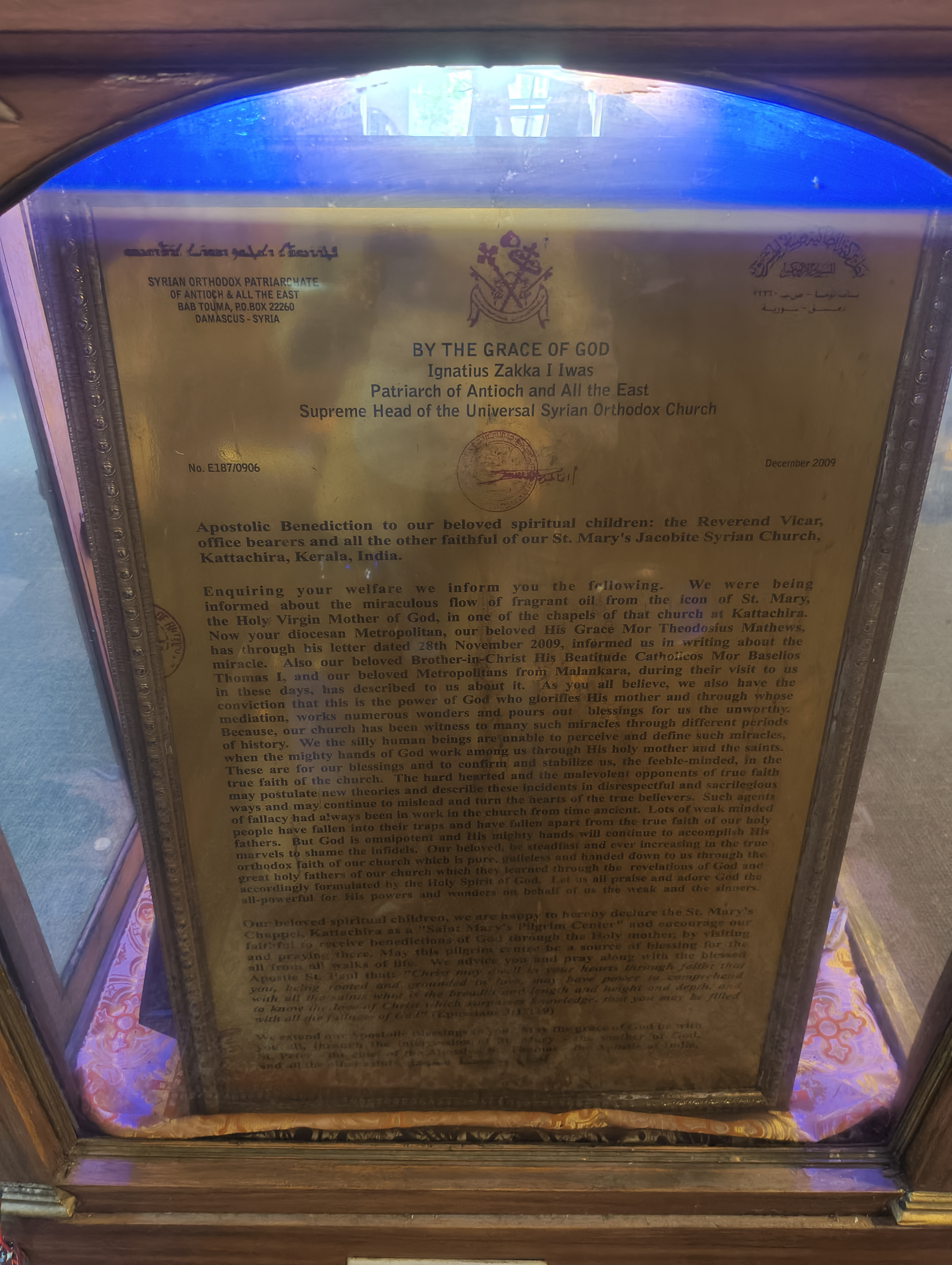
Weeping Syriac Orthodox Patriarch Ignatius Zakka I Pilgrim proclaimed bull

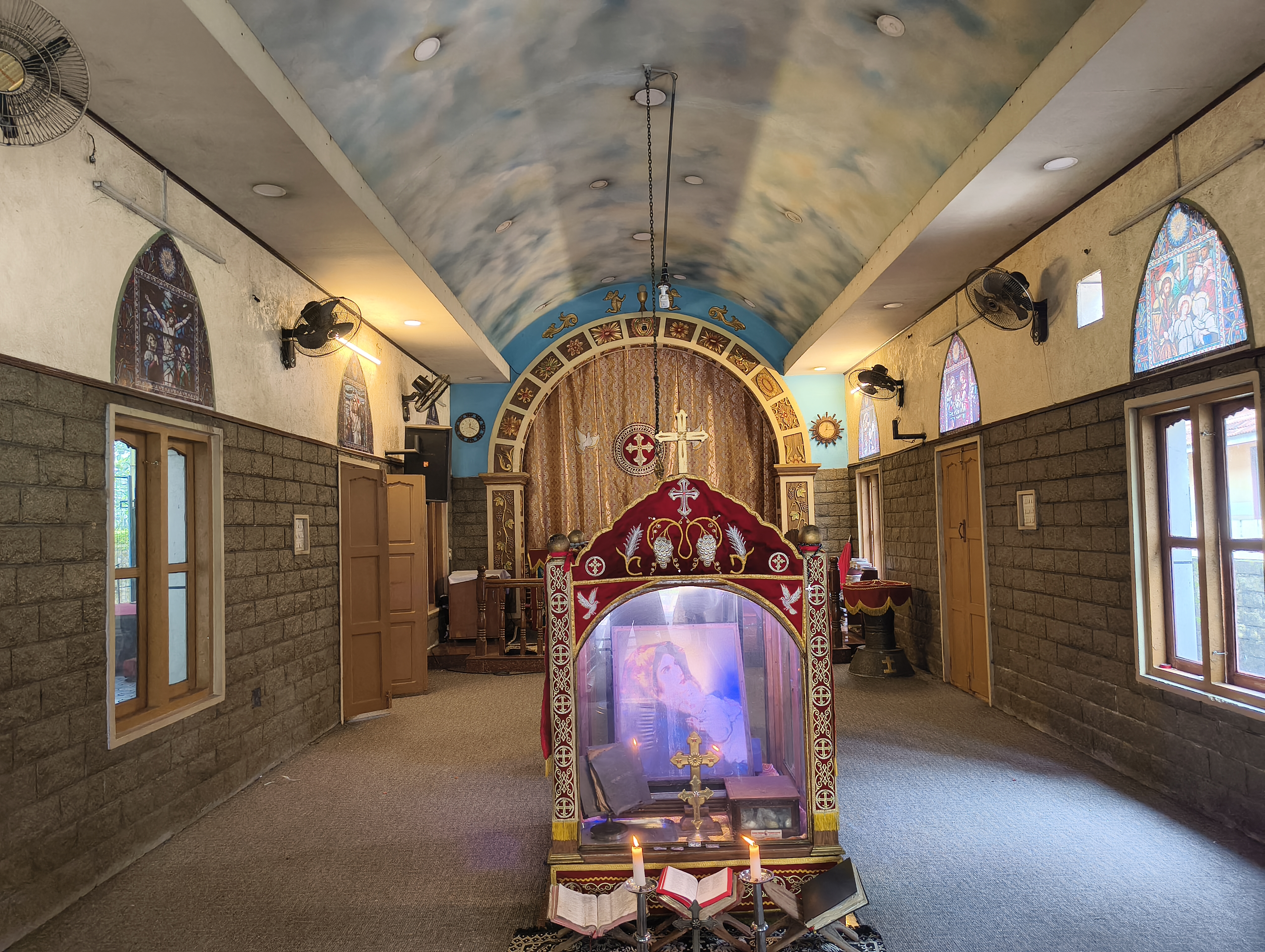
Inside view of Kattachira church

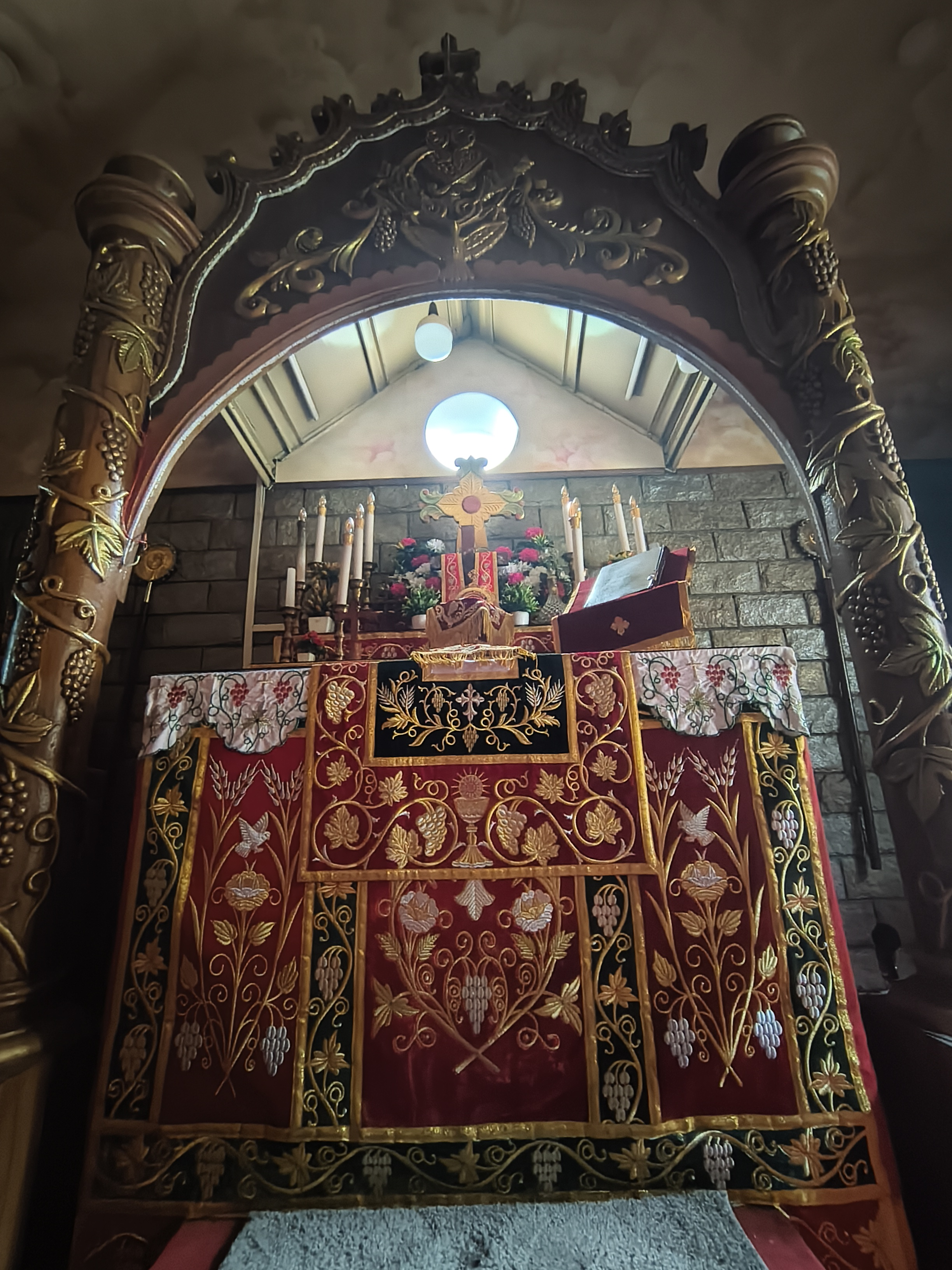
Holy Throne (Holy Altar) of Kattachira Church
