= Señor de las Tribulaciones =

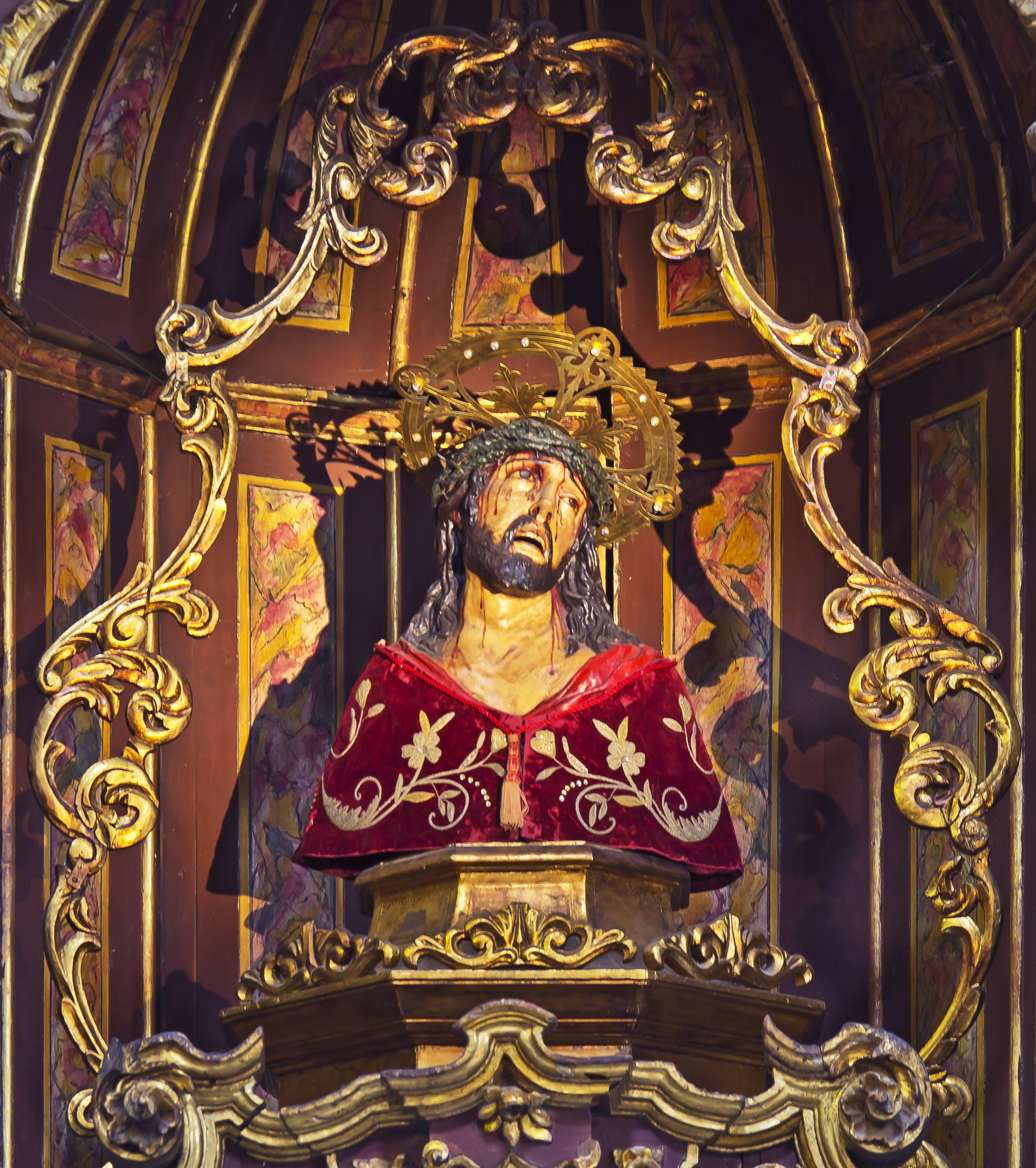
Señor de las Tribulaciones

The Señor de las Tribulaciones (in english: Lord of Tribulations) is the name given to an image of Jesus Christ that is venerated in the Iglesia de San Francisco de Asís in the city of Santa Cruz de Tenerife (Canary Islands, Spain).

This is a sculpture of cloth glued an "Ecce Homo" in the 17th century. The image is considered miraculous, is credited with saving the city of Santa Cruz de Tenerife during a cholera epidemic in 1893. The chronicles relate that the image was carried in procession through the streets of the city and the epidemic was eradicated miraculously. For this reason, the Señor de las Tribulaciones is invoked as protector of the city and has been given the title of Señor de Santa Cruz (Lord of Santa Cruz).

Even before this miracle, the miraculous image was already regarded as almost a century earlier, in 1795, the Señor de las Tribulaciones saved from a terrible disease to the wife of an influential man in the city, also began to sweat image miraculously. Currently, the image is carried in procession every Holy Tuesday through the streets of the city to where the epidemic ceased. The sculpture back out in procession on Good Friday.

== See also ==
- Iglesia de San Francisco de Asís (Santa Cruz de Tenerife)
- List of statues of Jesus
- Santa Cruz de Tenerife
