= Iglesia de la Concepción (Santa Cruz de Tenerife) =

Catholic church in the Canary Islands

Coordinates: 28°27′52″N 16°14′56″W

Church of the Immaculate Conception
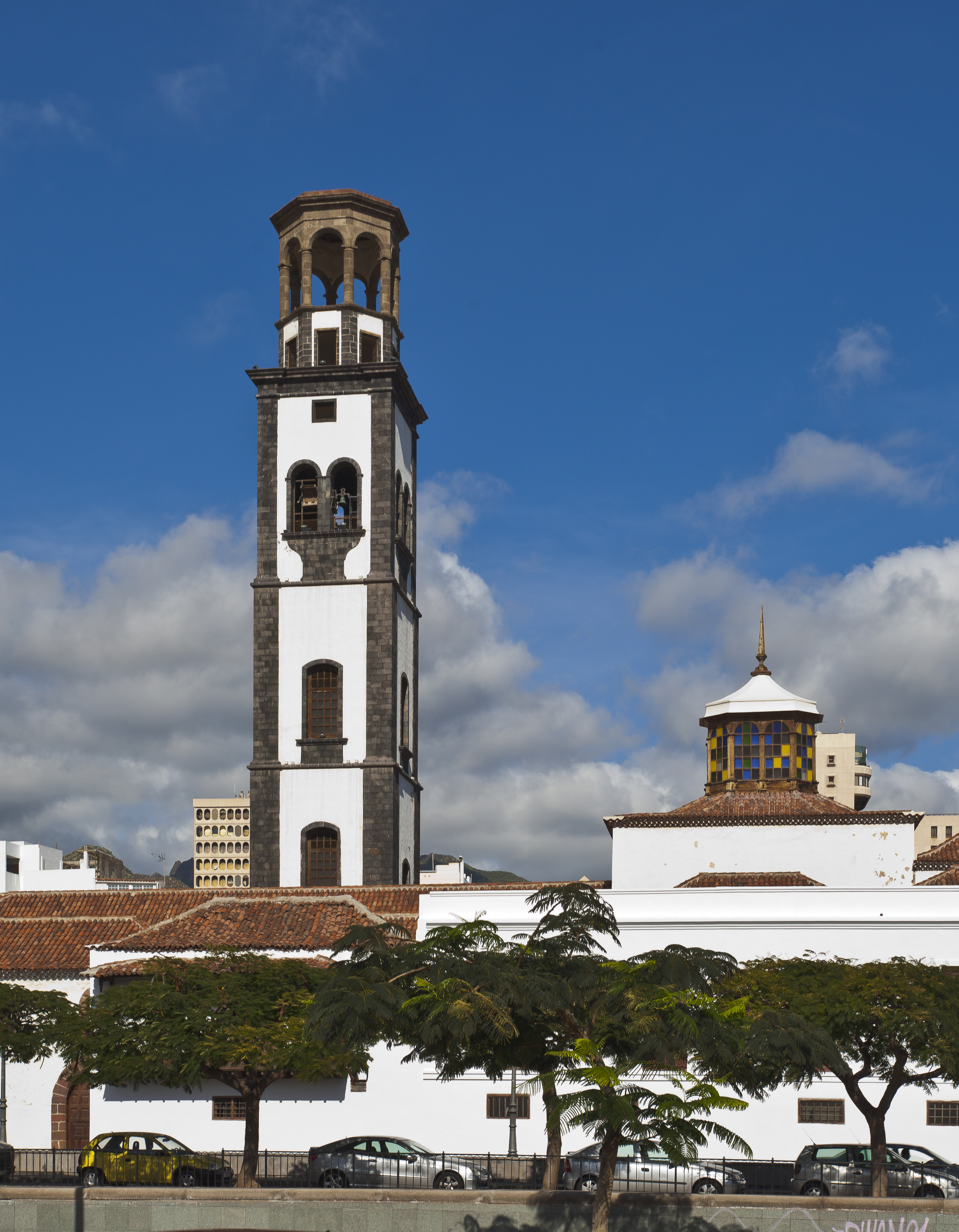
- Iglesia de la Concepción

Religion
- Affiliation: Roman Catholic
- Diocese: Diocese of San Cristóbal de La Laguna
- Province: Archdiocese of Seville
- Ecclesiastical or organisational status: Parish

Location
- Location: Santa Cruz de Tenerife, Spain.
- Interactive map of Church of the Immaculate Conception

Architecture
- Type: church
- Style: Colonial of the Canary Islands
- Completed: 1500
- Direction of façade: Northwest

The Iglesia-Parroquia Matriz de Nuestra Señora de La Concepción (Church of the Immaculate Conception) is a Catholic church located in the city of Santa Cruz de Tenerife (Canary Islands, Spain). It is the only church in the Canary Islands that has five naves.

This church was built upon the first chapel erected by the Spanish conquistadors after landing on the coast where they would later build the city. This church is the main centre of worship in the city, hence its being called "the Cathedral of Santa Cruz", despite the fact that it not is a cathedral; the Cathedral of La Laguna is the cathedral of Tenerife.

In 1500 work construction work began on a church dedicated to the Holy Cross founded by Father Juan Guerra. It was one of the first churches built on the island of Tenerife; in fact, the Church of the Conception of Santa Cruz was built near the place where the first Christian mass was held on the island of Tenerife after the founding of the city of Santa Cruz de Tenerife.

The Iglesia de la Concepción is dedicated to the Immaculate Conception of the Virgin Mary. The church houses the image of St. James (patron saint of Santa Cruz de Tenerife). The church is also home to the cross that gave rise to the founding of the city. Also of interest is the organ brought from London, acquired in 1862. There is also a relic of St. Clement I, Pope and Martyr, donated by the Patriarch of Antioch, Mr. Sidotti. Historically this has been highly revered in the city.

The church possesses is a small Gothic fifteenth-century image of Our Lady of Consolation (historical patron saint of Santa Cruz de Tenerife), of historical merit, the same as the one Alonso Fernández de Lugo placed in the hermitage of that name. It was the first Virgin to be venerated in Santa Cruz and one of the first devotional images in Tenerife.

The architectural style of the church is Baroque and Tuscan. The bell tower is the most emblematic element of the church. The Church of the Conception has been declared a site of cultural interest.

== Gallery ==
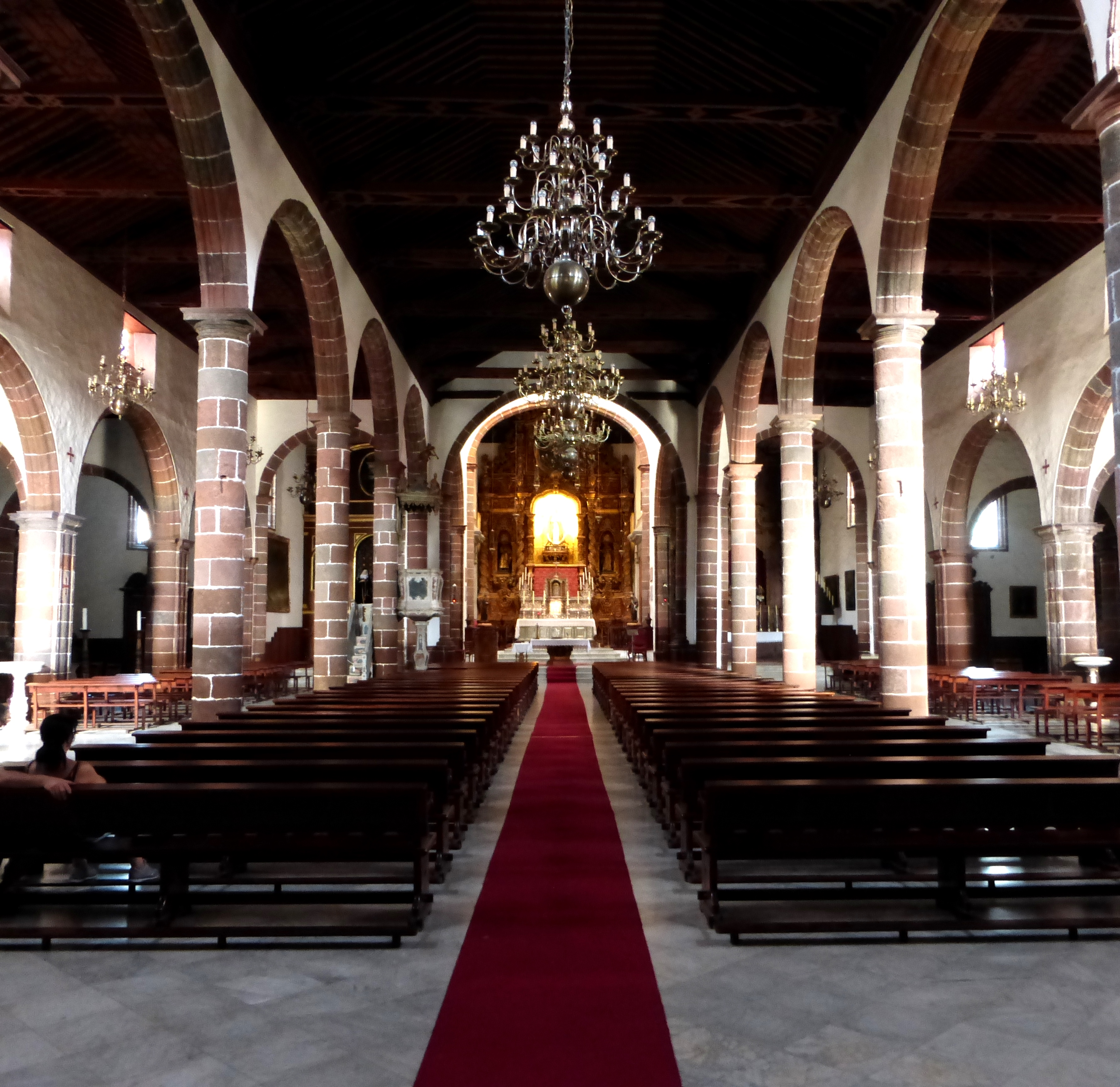
Interior of the church

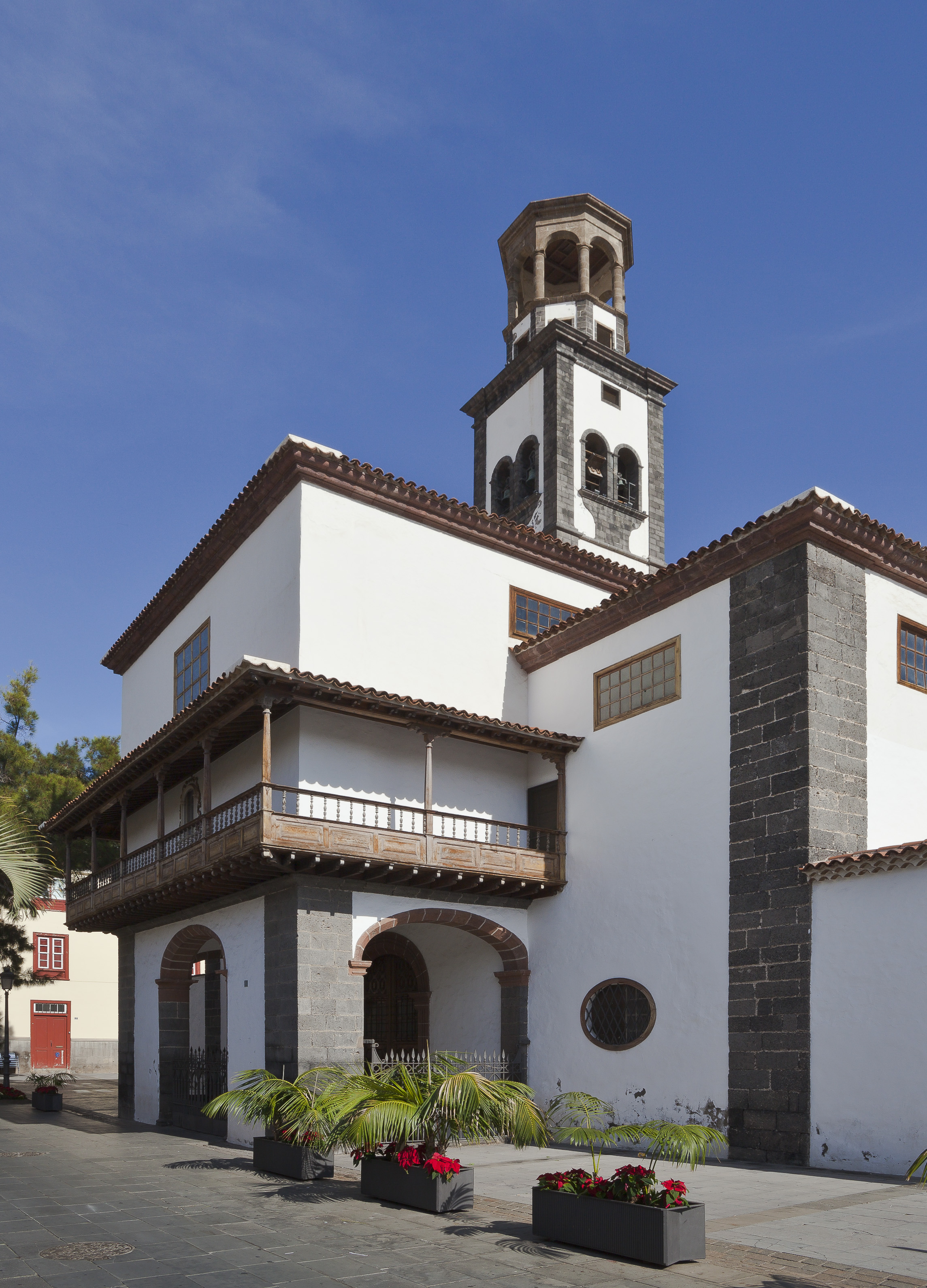
Exterior

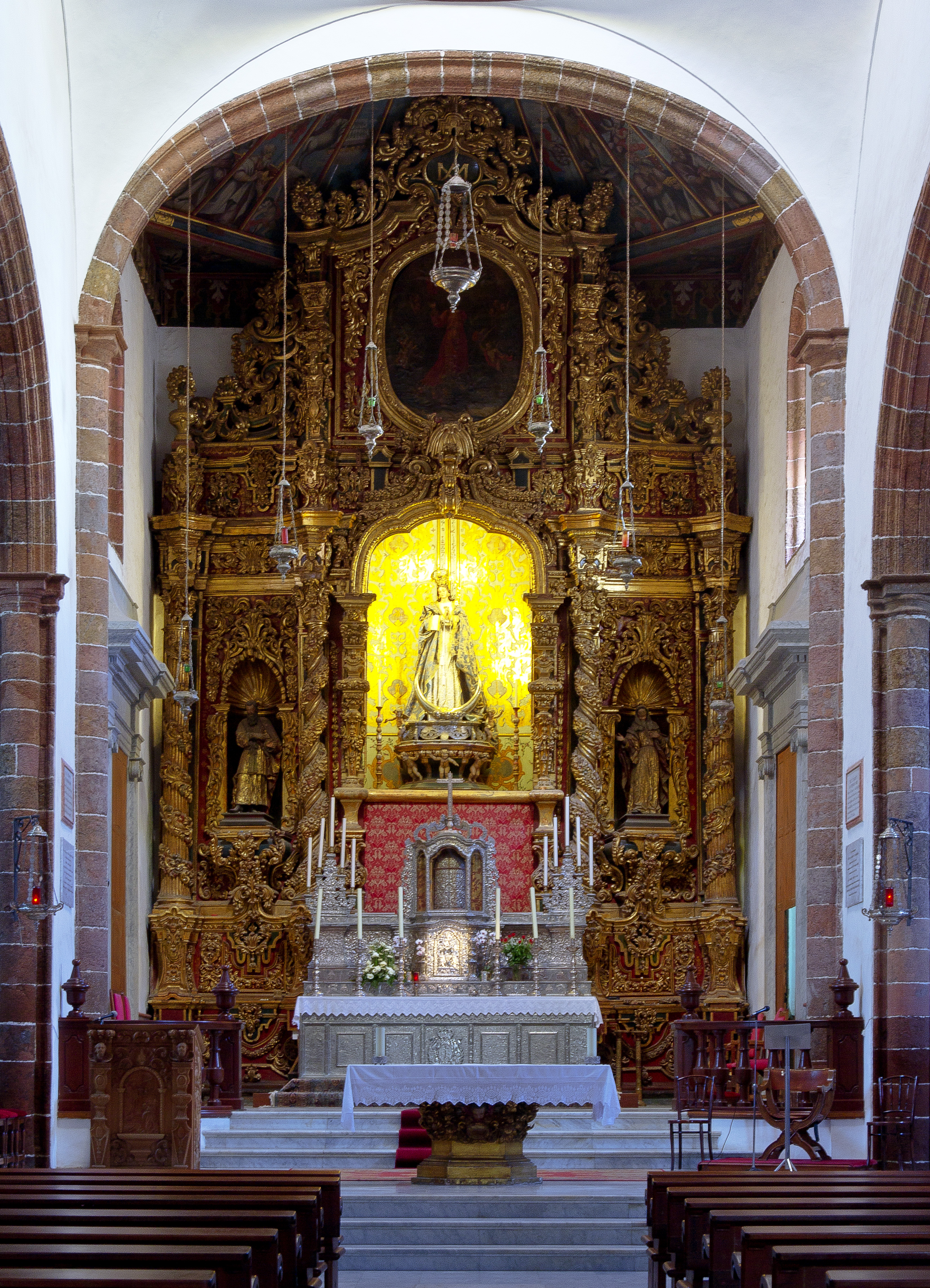
High altar

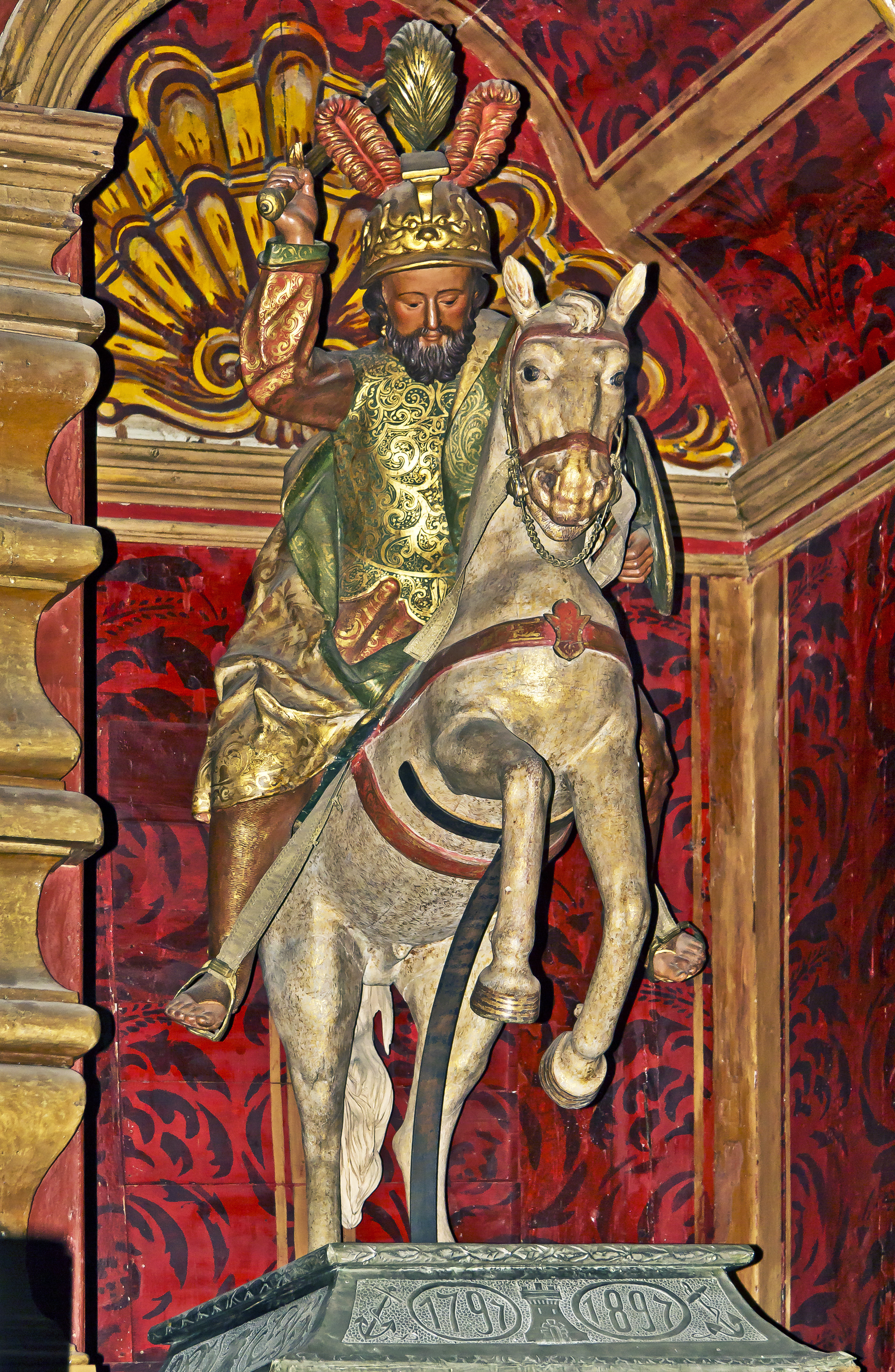
St. James, patron saint of Santa Cruz de Tenerife

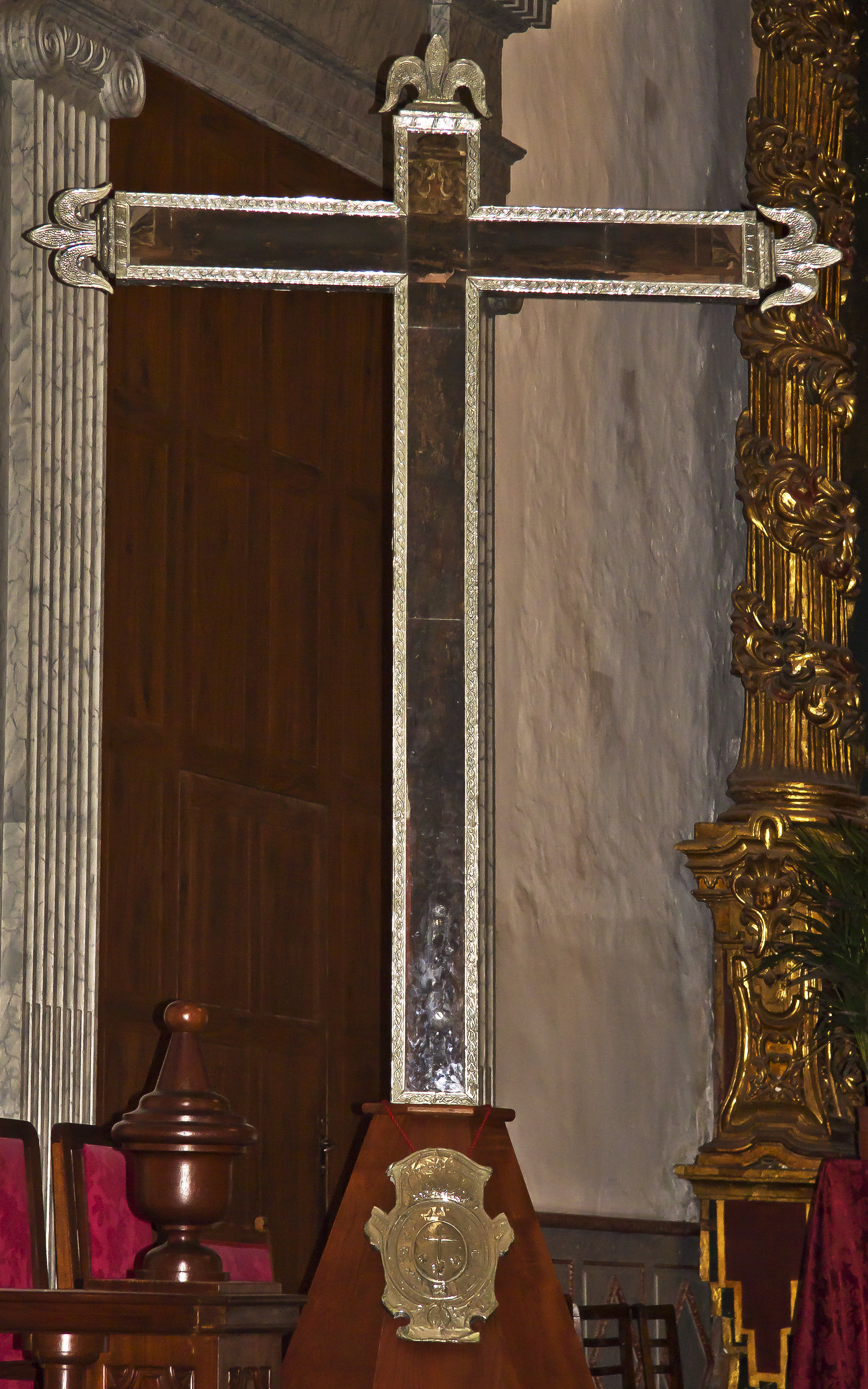
Holy Cross used during the Castilian conquest

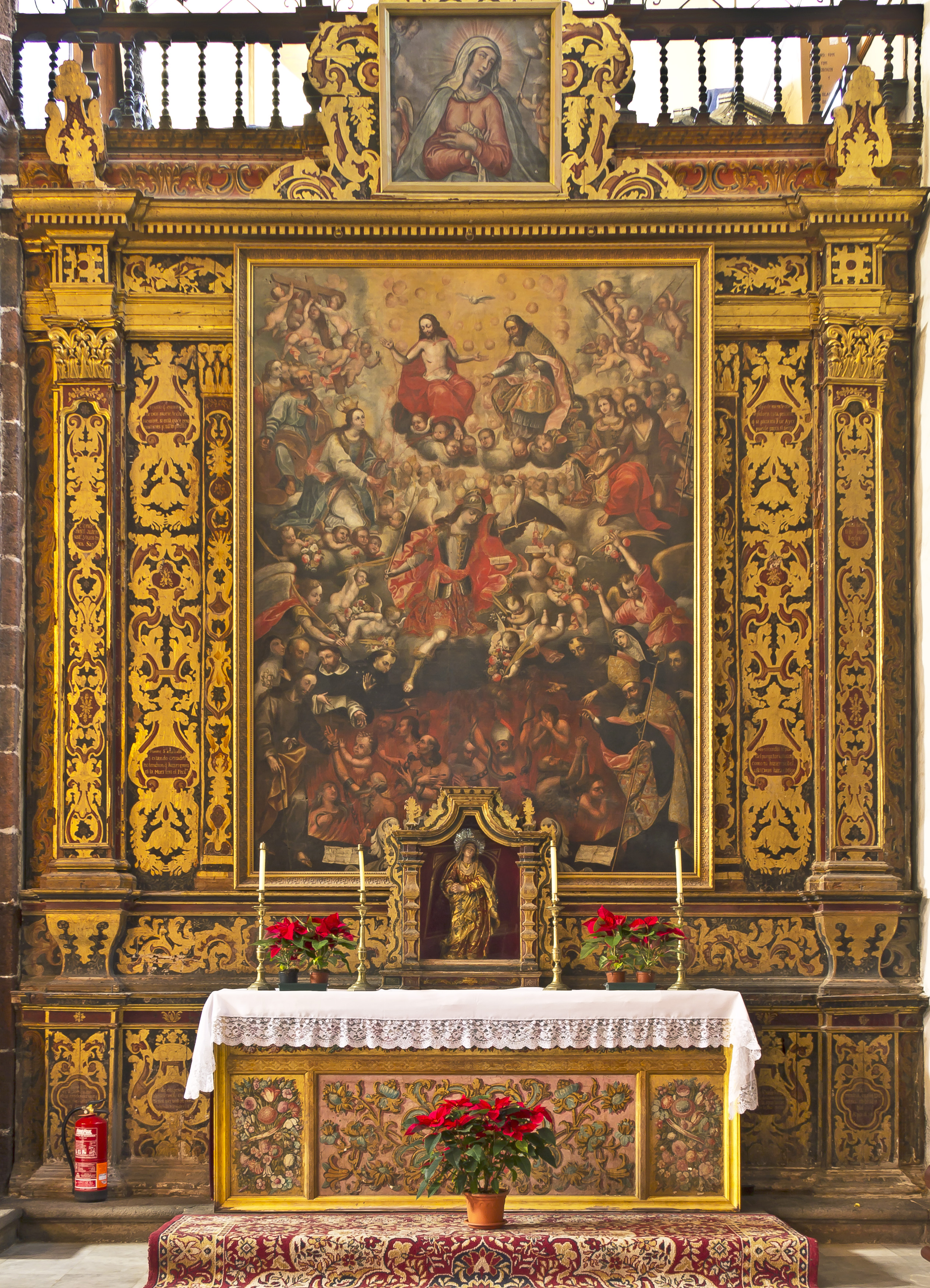
Altar of the Souls of Purgatory

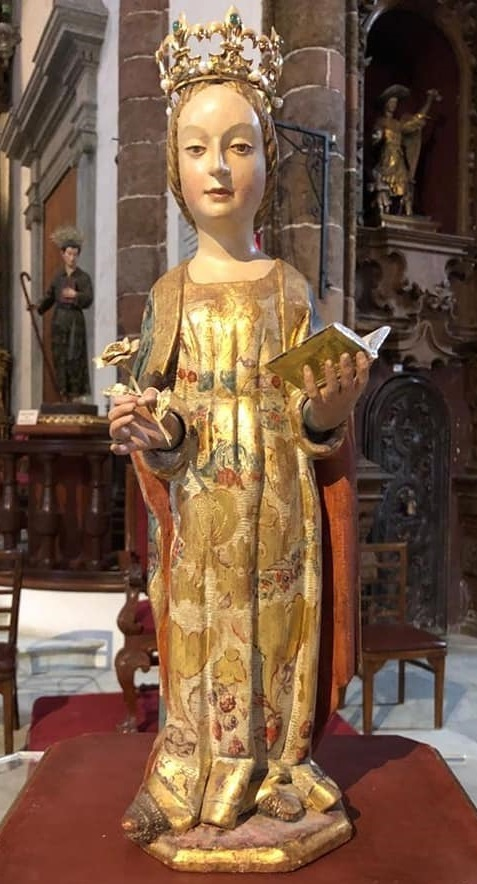
Original image of the Our Lady of Consolation, the historic patron saint of Santa Cruz de Tenerife

== See also ==
- Iglesia de la Concepción (San Cristóbal de La Laguna)
