= Iglesia de la Concepción (San Cristóbal de La Laguna) =

Roman Catholic church in the Canary Islands

Coordinates: 28°29′26″N 16°19′13″W

Church of the Immaculate Conception
- Tower of the church

Religion
- Affiliation: Roman Catholic
- Diocese: Diocese of San Cristóbal de La Laguna
- Province: Archdiocese of Seville

Location
- Location: San Cristóbal de La Laguna, Spain.
- Interactive map of Church of the Immaculate Conception

Architecture
- Type: church
- Style: Colonial of the Canary Islands
- Completed: 1511
- Direction of façade: East

The Iglesia-Parroquia Matriz de Nuestra Señora de La Concepción (Church of the Immaculate Conception) is a Roman Catholic church located in the city of San Cristóbal de La Laguna (Canary Islands, Spain). This church is almost a twin of the Church of the Conception of Santa Cruz de Tenerife. It was the first parish established in Tenerife.

The site of the church was established by the conqueror Alonso Fernández de Lugo after the celebration of the feast of Corpus Christi in 1496. The Church of the Conception was founded in 1511.

Today people can climb the tower to view much of the city of San Cristóbal de La Laguna. It houses the largest bell in the Canary Islands.

The Church of the Conception was declared of a site of cultural interest, specifically in the category of National Historic Monument in 1948. Inside the temple is the miraculous oil of St. John the Evangelist, the icon miraculously sweat during a Black Death in 1648, after this miracle the disease disappeared from the island. The Church of the Concepción is home to numerous brotherhoods, including the Pontificia, Imperial, Real y Venerable Hermandad de la Purísima Concepción, which in 1757 was added to the Brotherhood of the Immaculate Conception of the Basilica of Saint Lawrence outside the Walls in Rome.

Outside the temple next to the entrance door is the Monument to Pope John Paul II, Polish sculptor Czeslaw Dzwigaj representing the pontiff blessed with two children dressed in traditional costumes of the Canary Islands. The statue was brought from Poland and was blessed by the Bishop of Tenerife, Bernardo Álvarez Afonso and the archpriest of the Basilica of Santa Maria Maggiore in Rome, Santos Abril y Castelló.

== Gallery ==
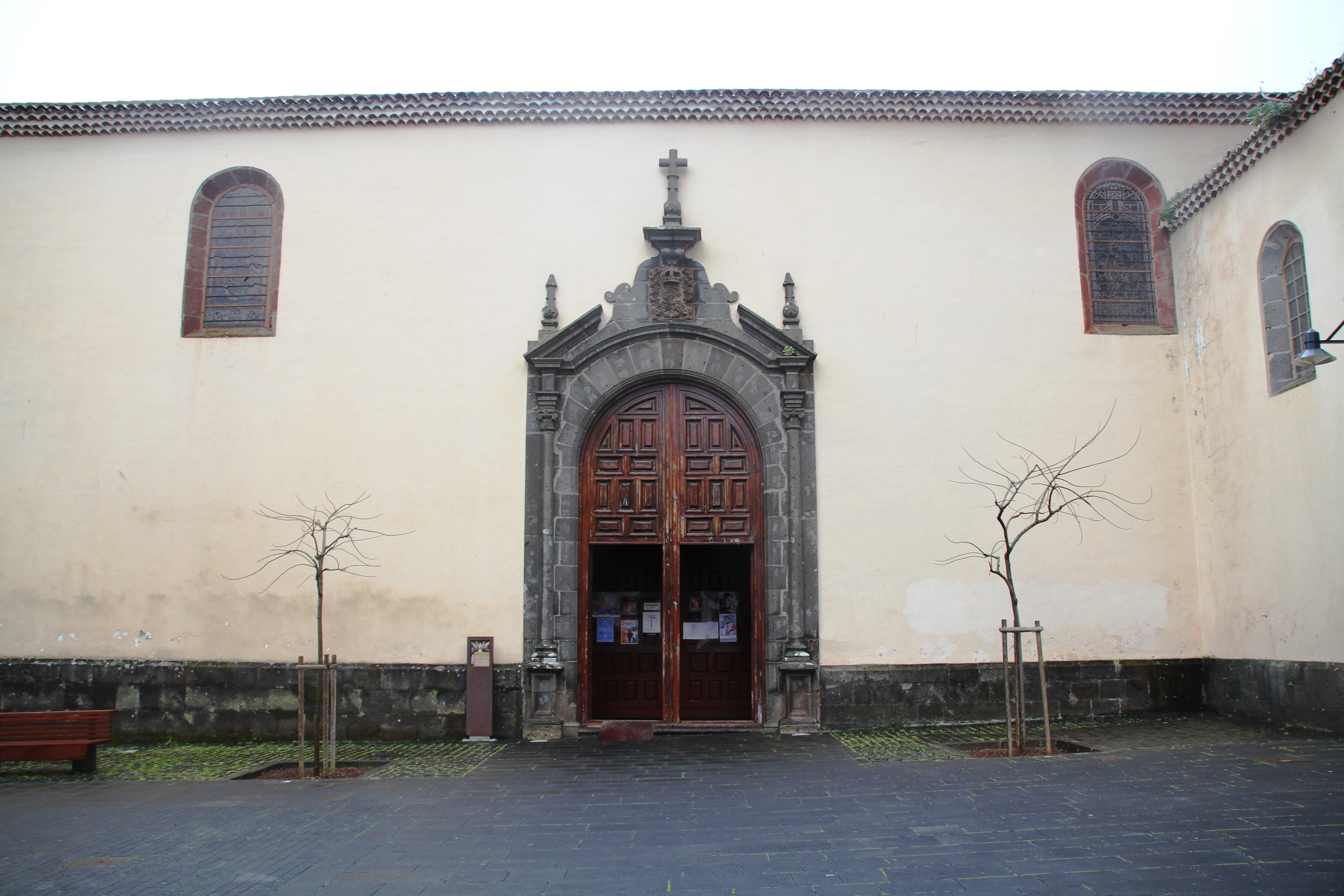
Front door

Main chapel

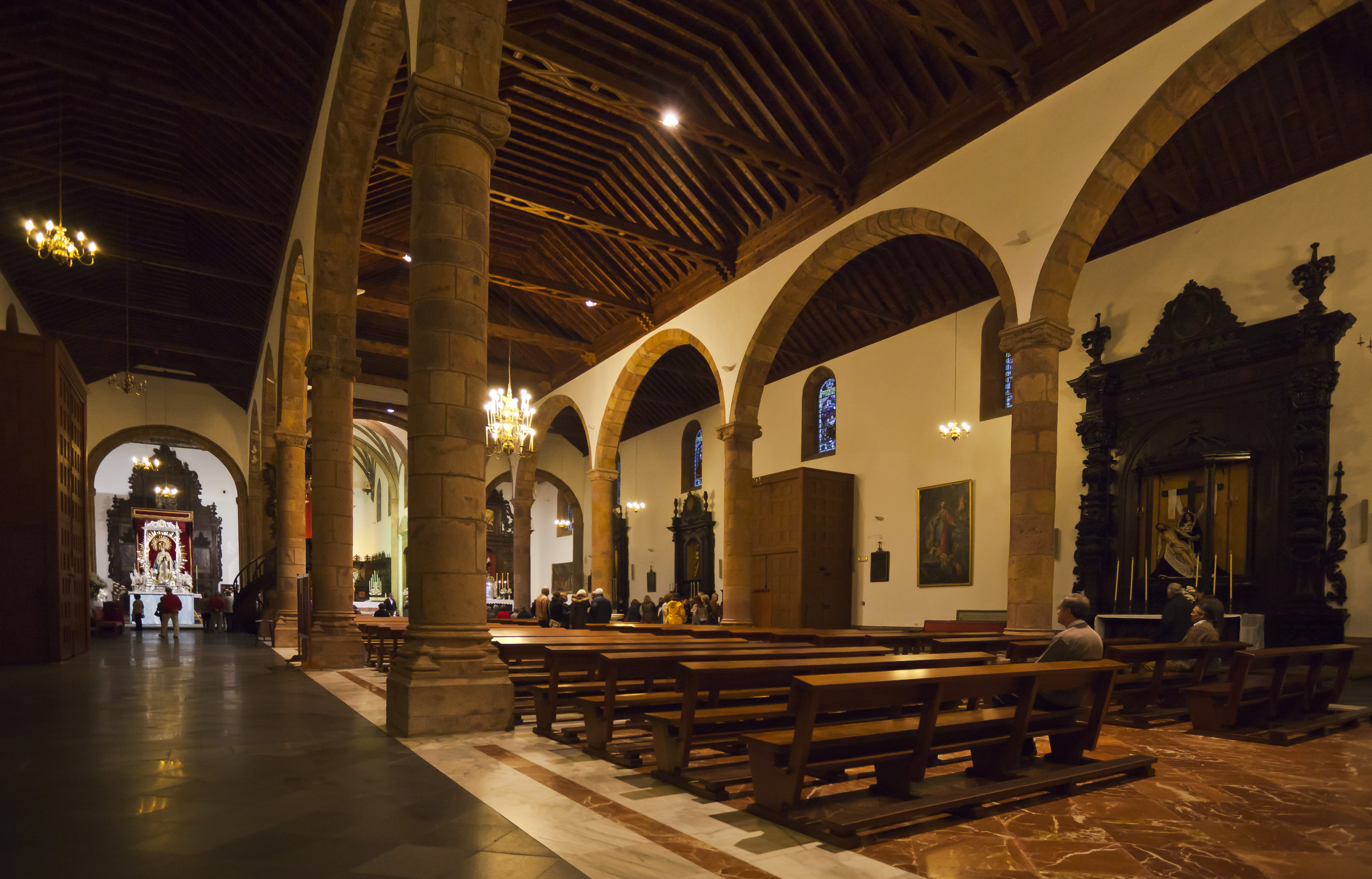
Interior of the church

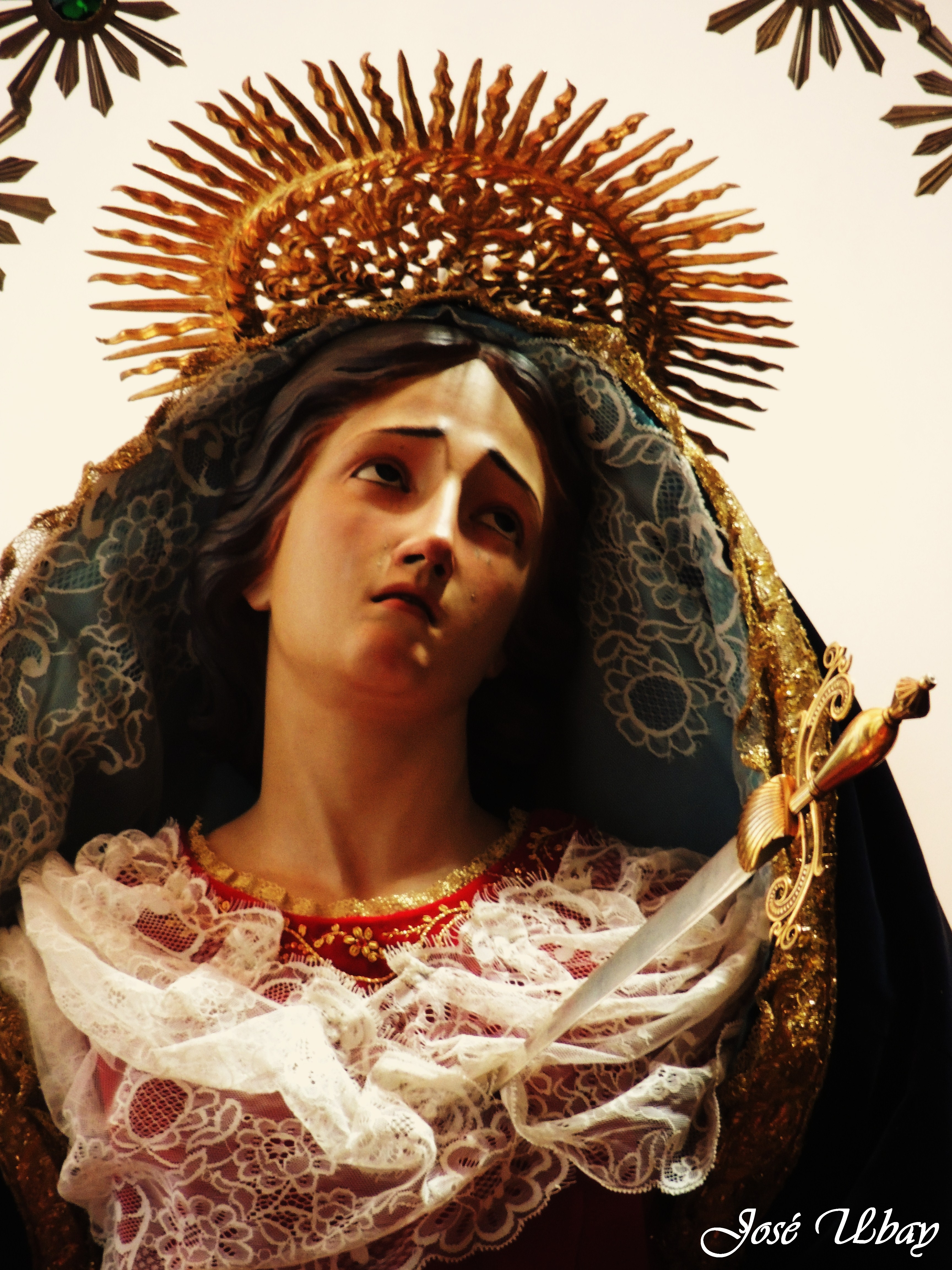
Our Lady of Sorrows

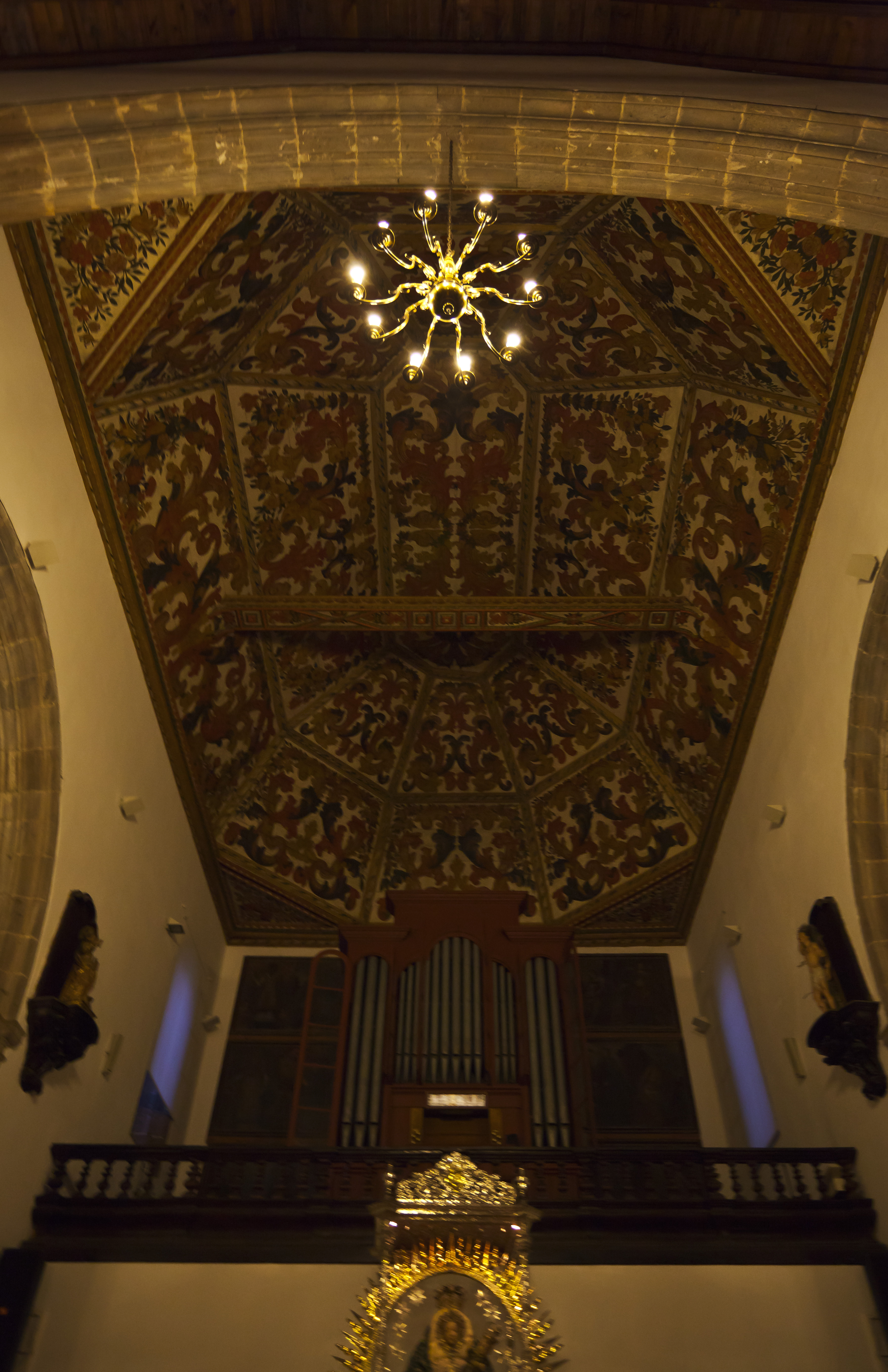
Wooden carved ceiling

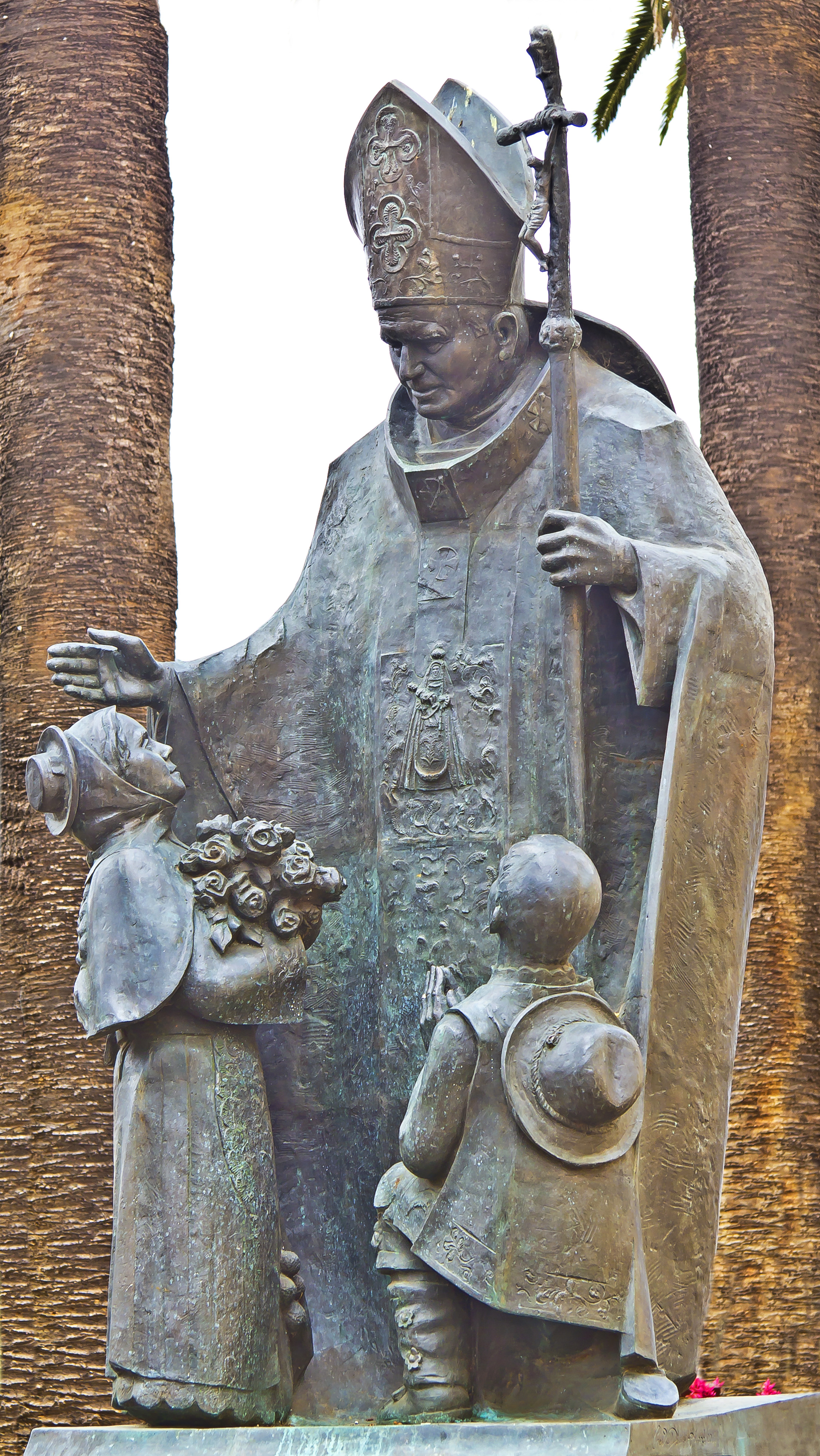
Statue of Pope John Paul II outside the temple

== See also ==
- Iglesia de la Concepción (Santa Cruz de Tenerife)
