= Amaro Pargo: entre la leyenda y la historia =

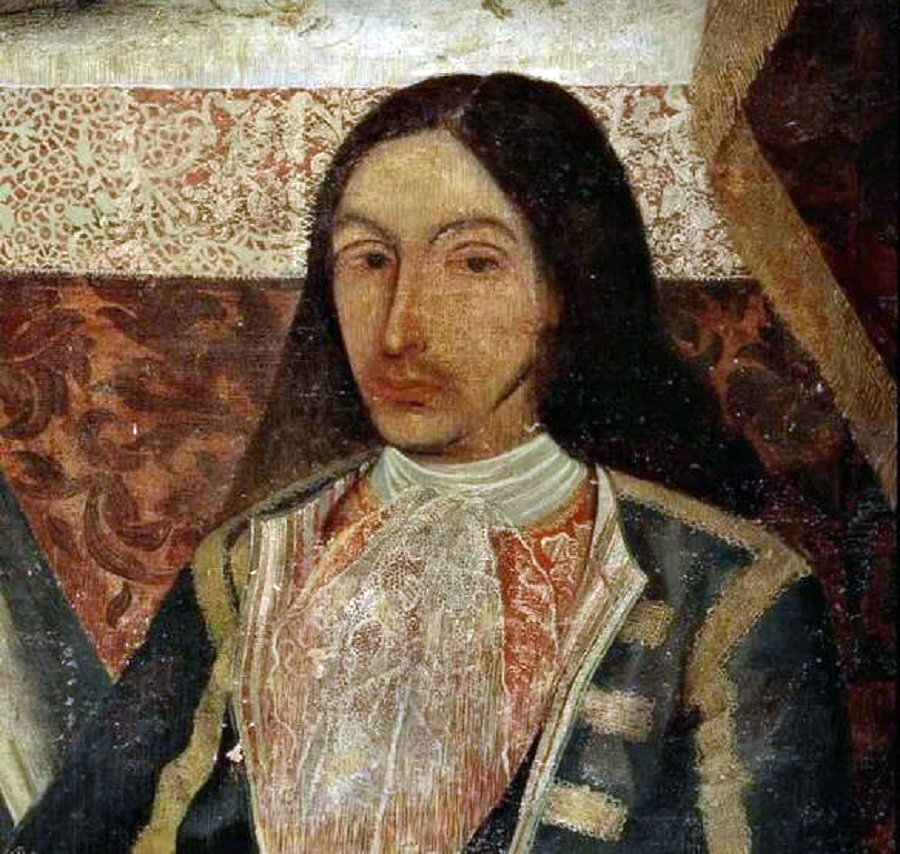
- Directed by: Juan Alfredo Amil
- Produced by: Benjamín Reyes, Rumen Justo Reyes
- Starring: Luis de Zárate; Domingo Barbuzano; Ramón González de Mesa; Manuel Hernández González; Sister Cleofé; Alfredo López
- Music by: Juan Alfredo Amil
- Distributed by: JR Producciones
- Release date: 2017
- Running time: 52 mins
- Country: Spain
- Language: Spanish

Amaro Pargo: entre la leyenda y la historia (English: Amaro Pargo: between legend and history) is a documentary film of the year 2017, which deals with the life and enigmas that surround the figure of the Spanish corsair Amaro Rodríguez Felipe, better known as Amaro Pargo (1678-1747). The film was directed by Juan Alfredo Amil, with the collected documentation and the interviews made by the journalist Benjamín Reyes.

== Argument ==
The film and documentary narrate the life of Amaro Pargo and the mysteries that surround it, such as the mention of an unrecognized son that the corsair had in Havana (Cuba) or the ownership of his estate or not of the hacienda or Casa de Los Mesa in Machado (El Rosario). It also deals with the discovery of a document written by Amaro himself, in which he talks about the granting of the privateering patent by King Philip V of Spain, the whereabouts of a missing portrait of him painted by José Rodríguez de la Oliva, his relationship with the religious Sister María de Jesús Delgado, or if her treasure really existed.

== Reception ==
The film-documentary was premiered directly on television on August 10, 2017 through Televisión Canaria with great audience success, and has subsequently been screened in cultural venues throughout the Canary Islands, being the first film in the history of the Canarian cinema that has been exhibited in all the islands and premiered in five of them.

== Locations ==
Convent of Santa Catalina de Siena and Church of Santo Domingo de Guzmán, both in San Cristóbal de La Laguna, the Hermitage of Nuestra Señora del Rosario and the ruins of Casa de Los Mesa in Machado, La Miravala estate and vineyards El Borgoñón de Tegueste and Punta del Hidalgo (La Laguna).

== Distribution ==
In the documentary they intervene:

- Luis de Zárate (representing the eighteenth-century painter José Rodríguez de la Oliva)
- Domingo Barbuzano (author of the book El Corsario Amaro Pargo)
- Ramón González de Mesa (eighth nephew-grandson of Amaro Pargo)
- Manuel Hernández González (professor at the University of La Laguna)
- Sister Cleofé (Superior of the Convent of Santa Catalina de Siena)
- Alfredo López (actor who represents Amaro Pargo in theatrical visits)
