= Holy Week in San Cristóbal de La Laguna =

Religious event in Tenerife, Spain

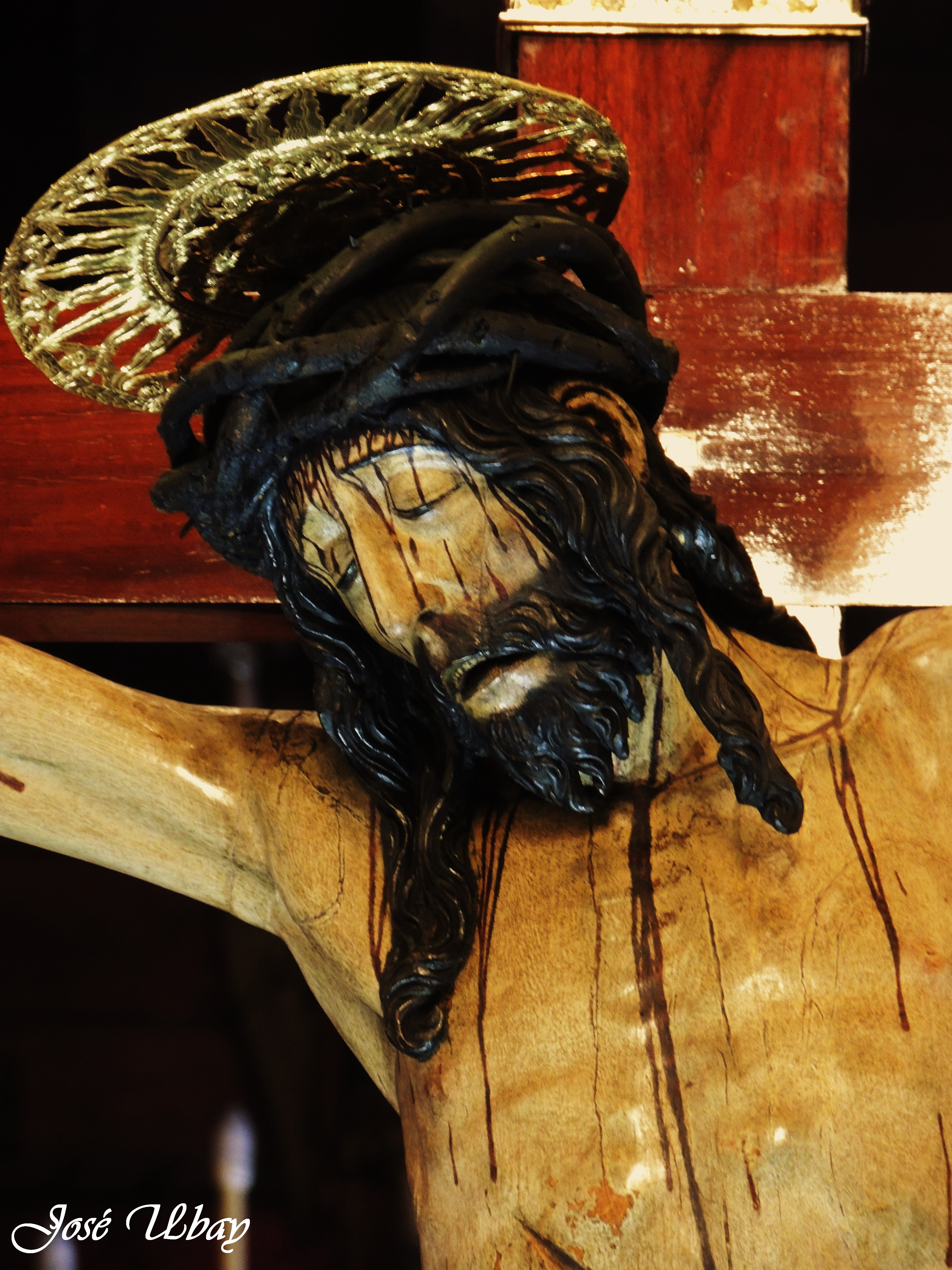
Cristo de La Laguna, the most famous religious image of Holy Week in La Laguna.

Holy Week in San Cristóbal de La Laguna is a traditional event that has been repeated for centuries in the historic center of San Cristóbal de La Laguna, a city located on the island of Tenerife, Spain. It is considered the most remarkable Holy Week in the Canary Islands.

During the celebrations, parades and processions of statues that commemorate the Passion of Christ and objects of great historical and artistic goldsmith value are carried out through the streets of the city.

== Urban and architectural ensemble of San Cristóbal de La Laguna ==
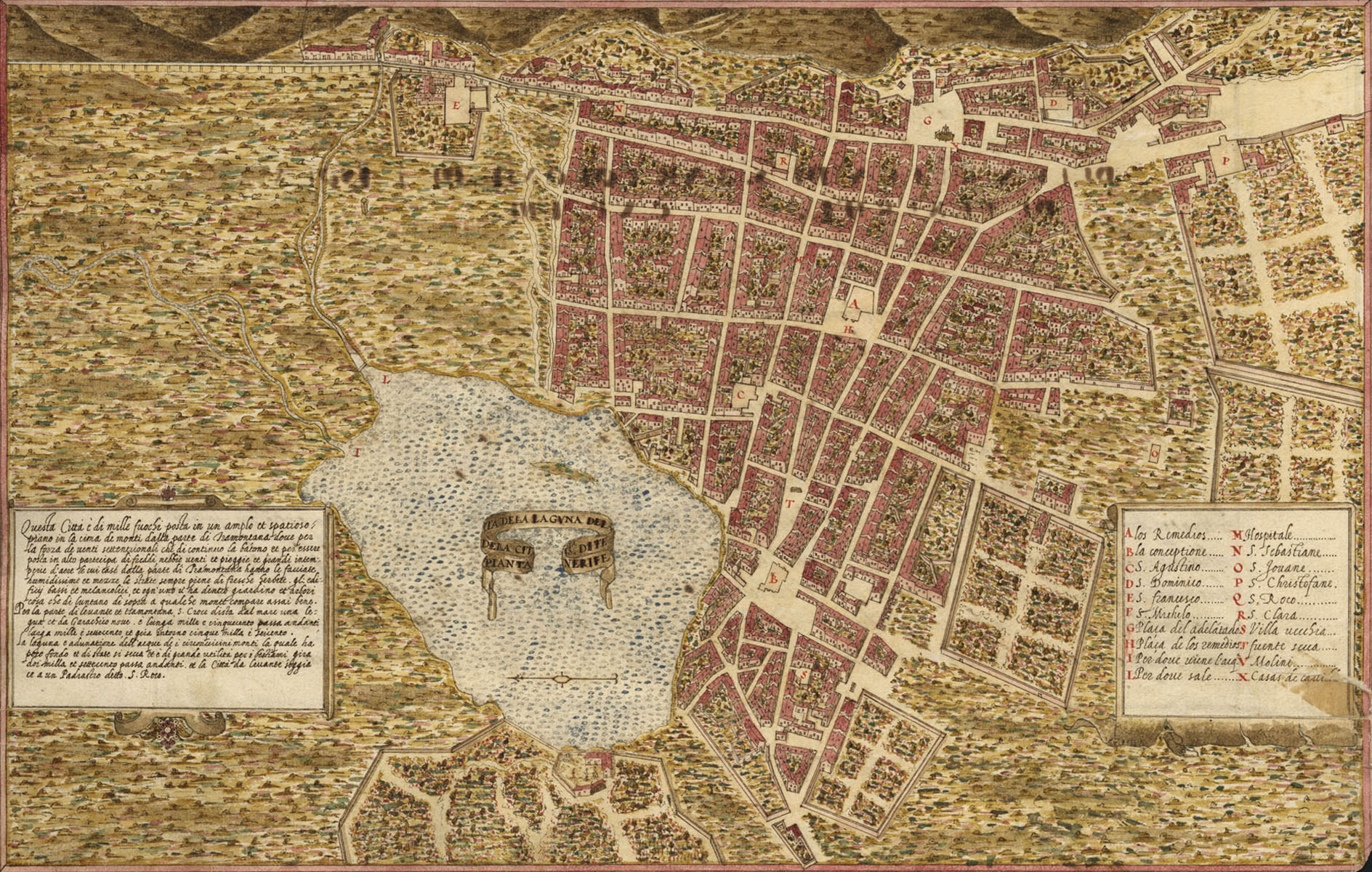
Map of La Laguna drawn up by the engineer Leonardo Torriani in 1588. It shows the grid plan of the city, which is still preserved.

The first example of an overseas city-territory and an institutional city, San Cristóbal de La Laguna was designed as a "city of peace", the only Renaissance city without walls. Built to human size and drawn on a grid, with navigation instruments. The city preserves a valuable architectural, artistic and festive heritage. In 1999, the old part of the city was declared a World Heritage Site, the only Canarian city with such a distinction. This provides the processional routes with a pronounced stamp reflected in the transit of images through its centuries-old streets and squares.

== Sculpture catalog ==
The repertoire of processional imagery that takes to the streets of the city is a range of carvings from various sources. The old capital of the island of Tenerife brings together effigies that are encompassed in a time span that goes from the 16th to the 21st century. These works of art come from places as disparate as the former provinces of the Netherlands; of colonial America; of the Italian commercial ports, of the Sevillian workshops of the 18th century; or from the baroque and the insular nineteenth-century neoclassicism, the latter being the most brilliant period of Canarian sculpture.

Image makers as important as Louis Van Der Vule (16th century), Antonio de Orbarán (1620–1671), Lázaro González de Ocampo (1651–1714), Pietro Galleano (1687–1761), José Rodríguez de la Oliva (1695–1777), Luján Pérez (1756–1815), Fernando Estévez (1788–1854), Gabriel de Astorga y Miranda (1804–1895) or Ezequiel de León Domínguez (1926–2008), supplied the numerous temples of the city of San Cristóbal de La Laguna.

== History ==
The celebration of Holy Week probably began with the Spanish conquest and the systematic celebration is attested from the second decade of the 16th century. It is considered as the oldest celebration of Holy Week taking place in the archipelago.

The bibliographical and documentary information that we have today leads us to support the antiquity of the Cofradía de la Sangre (Brotherhood of the Blood), whose Holy Thursday penitential procession would be the only one until the end of the 16th century, that toured the streets of La Laguna on the days of Holy Week.

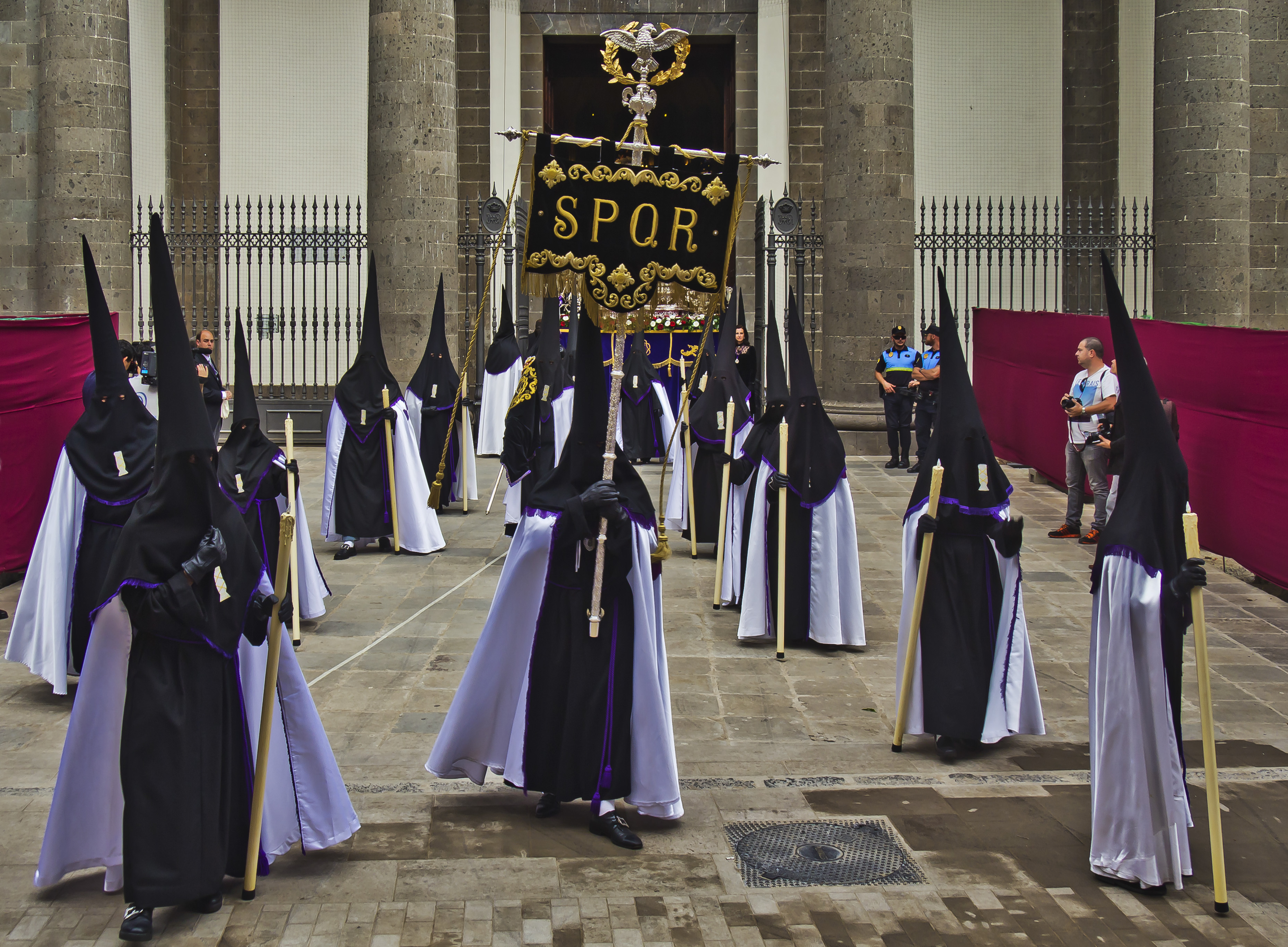
Departure of the brotherhoods of the Cathedral during the Magna Procession of Good Friday.

As the city did not have an episcopal seat before the 19th century, the processions were limited to the parishes to which they belonged. Later the cathedral was included in the processional processions and the procession extended outside the parish limits. In fact, all the brotherhoods of Holy Week in La Laguna currently carry out a time of penance in the cathedral throughout Holy Week.

The reestablishment of the Diocese of San Cristóbal de La Laguna in 1877 and the reconstruction of the Cathedral in 1913 mark a resurgence in the life of the city's brotherhoods, whose role was fundamental in shaping Holy Week as it is celebrated today. with the creation of the Magna Procession in 1927, the Early Morning Procession in 1933 or the first proclamation of Holy Week in 1949.

In 1953 the Consejo de Hermandades y Cofradías de La Laguna was founded, which is made up of 26 brotherhoods, the council was founded with the aim not only of coordinating the activities of Holy Week, but also of organizing other celebrations with the diocesan administration. Another task of the council is to publicly represent the interests of the fraternities.

It is currently being processed by the city council, the diocese and the association of brotherhoods of the city for its recognition as an event of national interest.

== Activities ==
The activities related to this Christian celebration begin long before Holy Week itself and are not strictly limited to religious events. Although the main act continues to be the many processions that go through the streets of the city, there are also musical events, art exhibitions, conferences, religious-themed film screenings, poetry recitals, photo contests, children's crafts, collection of non-perishable food for those most in need, etc. There will also be a gastronomic week (the Semana Gastronómica de Vigilia). During this gastronomic week, among other things, wine tastings from various wineries in the region and a contest for the best torrija, a typical product of Holy Week in Spain, take place.

== Brotherhoods ==
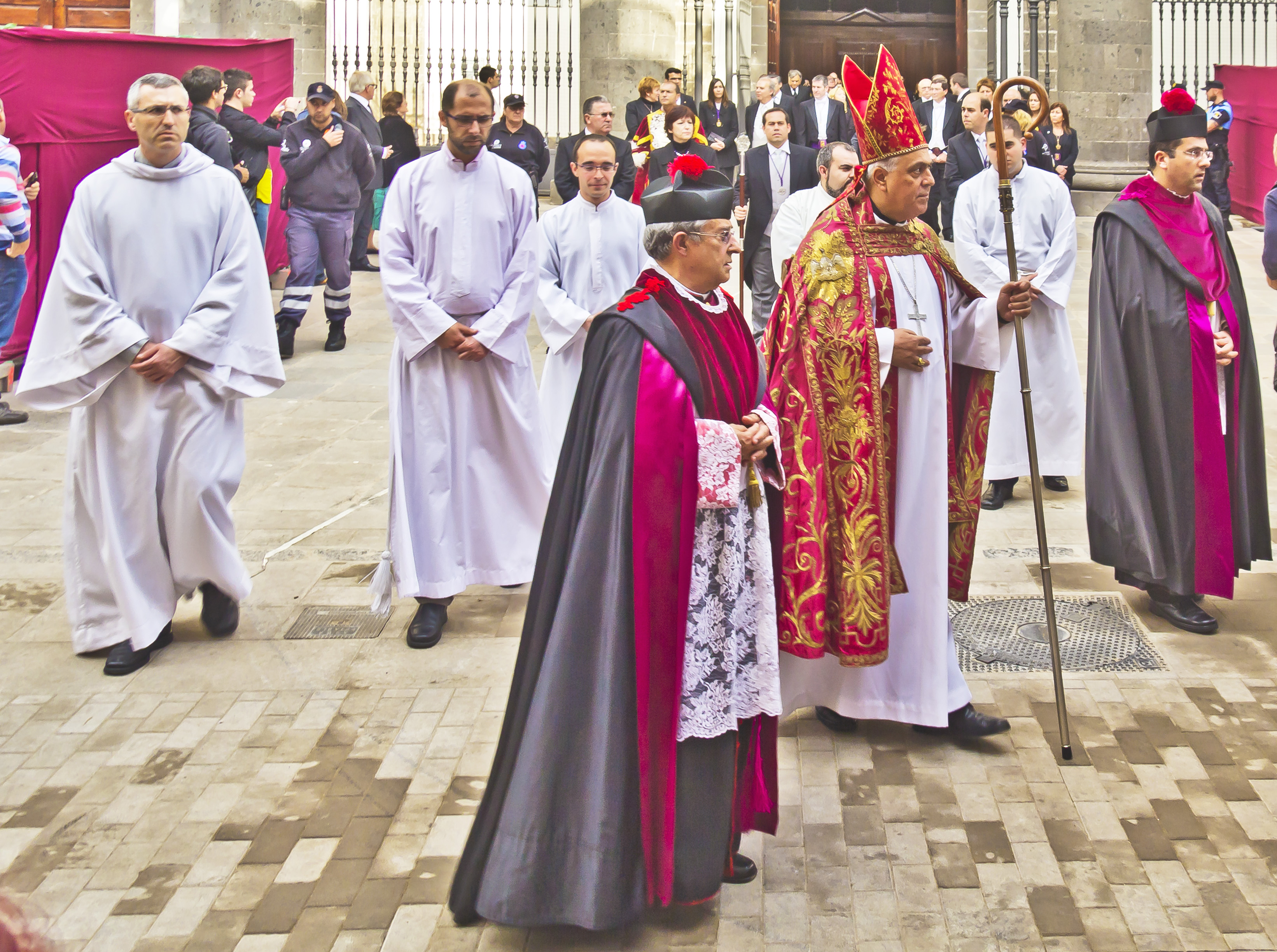
Bernardo Álvarez Afonso, bishop of San Cristóbal de La Laguna during the Magna Procession of 2014.

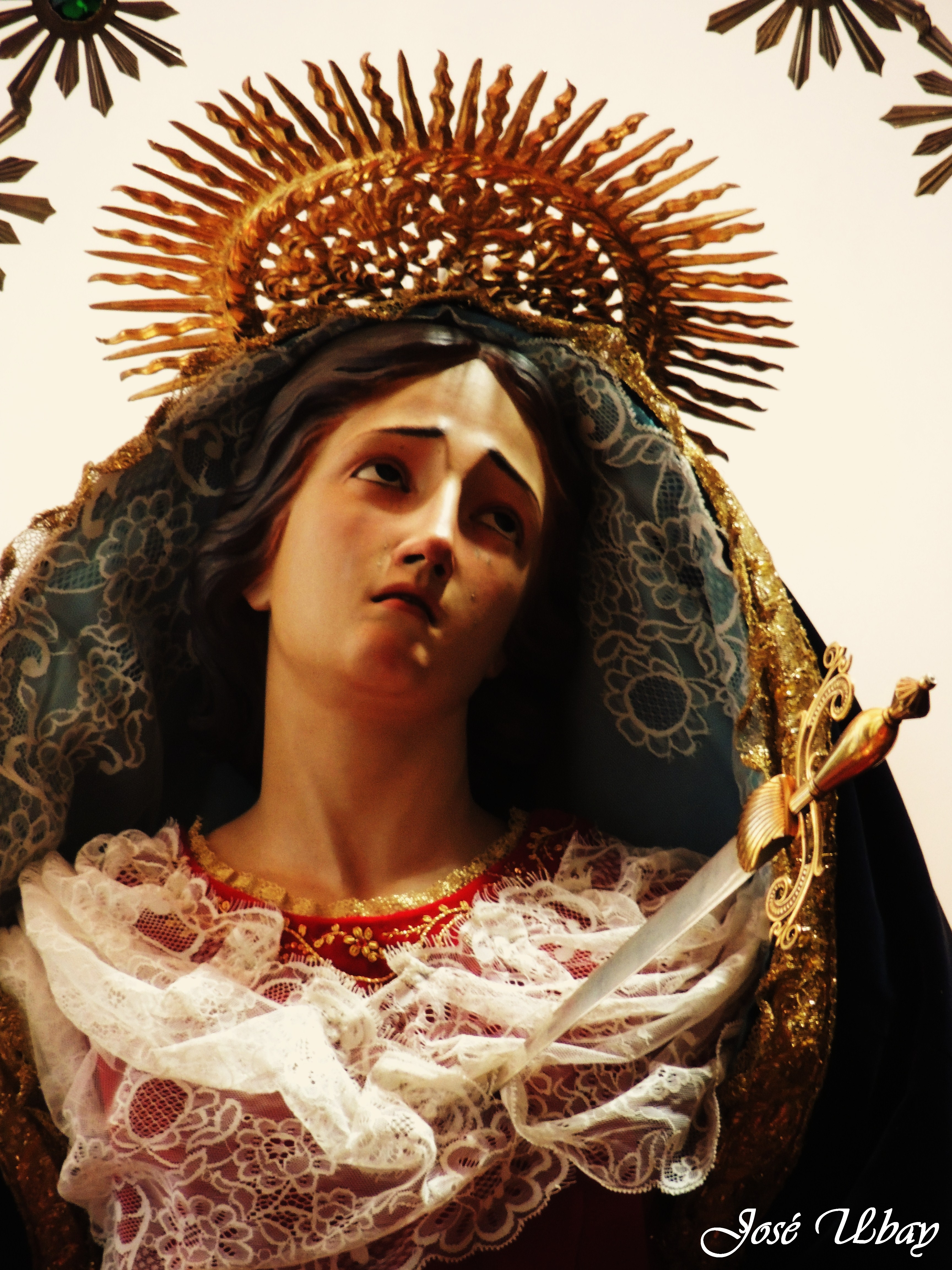
Our Lady of Sorrows, is located in the Church of La Concepción.

Currently, Holy Week in La Laguna has numerous brotherhoods and fraternities, among them stand out;

- Cofradía del Santísimo Cristo de Burgos y de Nuestra Señora de la Cinta (1955)
- Cofradía del Santísimo Cristo del Rescate y Nuestra Señora de los Dolores (1979)
- Cofradía de la Entrada de Jesús en Jerusalén (1961)
- Real Hermandad y Cofradía de Nuestro Padre Jesús de la Sentencia y María Santísima de la Amargura (1961)
- Cofradía del Cristo de las Caídas (1955)
- Hermandad del Cristo del Amor Misericordioso y Servidores del Templo (1984)
- Venerable Orden Tercera Franciscana y Hermandad Franciscana de la Oración en el Huerto (originally 17th century, current brotherhood 2003)
- Cofradía de las Insignias de la Pasión del Señor y la Soledad de María Santísima (1955)
- Real, Muy Ilustre y Capitular Cofradía de la Flagelación de Nuestro Señor Jesucristo, Nuestra Señora de las Angustias y Santísimo Cristo de los Remedios (1951)
- Hermandad del Santísimo de la Iglesia de la Concepción (before 1644)
- Cofradía de la Verónica y la Santa Faz (1980)
- Cofradía de Nuestro Padre Jesús Nazareno y Nuestra Señora de la Soledad (1953)
- Muy Antigua y Venerable Hermandad de la Sangre de Cristo y la Santa Cruz (originally 16th century, current brotherhood 1950)
- Hermandad del Santísimo de la Santa Iglesia Catedral de La Laguna y su Sección Penitencial (originally 1969, current brotherhood 1983)
- Cofradía de la Misericordia (originally 16th century, current brotherhood 1952)
- Cofradía Penitencial de la Unción y Mortaja de Cristo (1955)
- Venerable Hermandad del Santísimo Rosario, Nuestra Señora de la Soledad y Santísimo Cristo Resucitado (1957)
- Venerable Hermandad Sacramental de San Lázaro y Cofradía Penitencial del Santísimo Cristo del Calvario y María Santísima de los Dolores (1977)
- Pontificia, Real y Venerable Esclavitud del Santísimo Cristo de La Laguna (before 1545)
- Cofradía de Nuestra Señora de la Piedad y del Lignum Crucis (1952)

== Processional steps ==
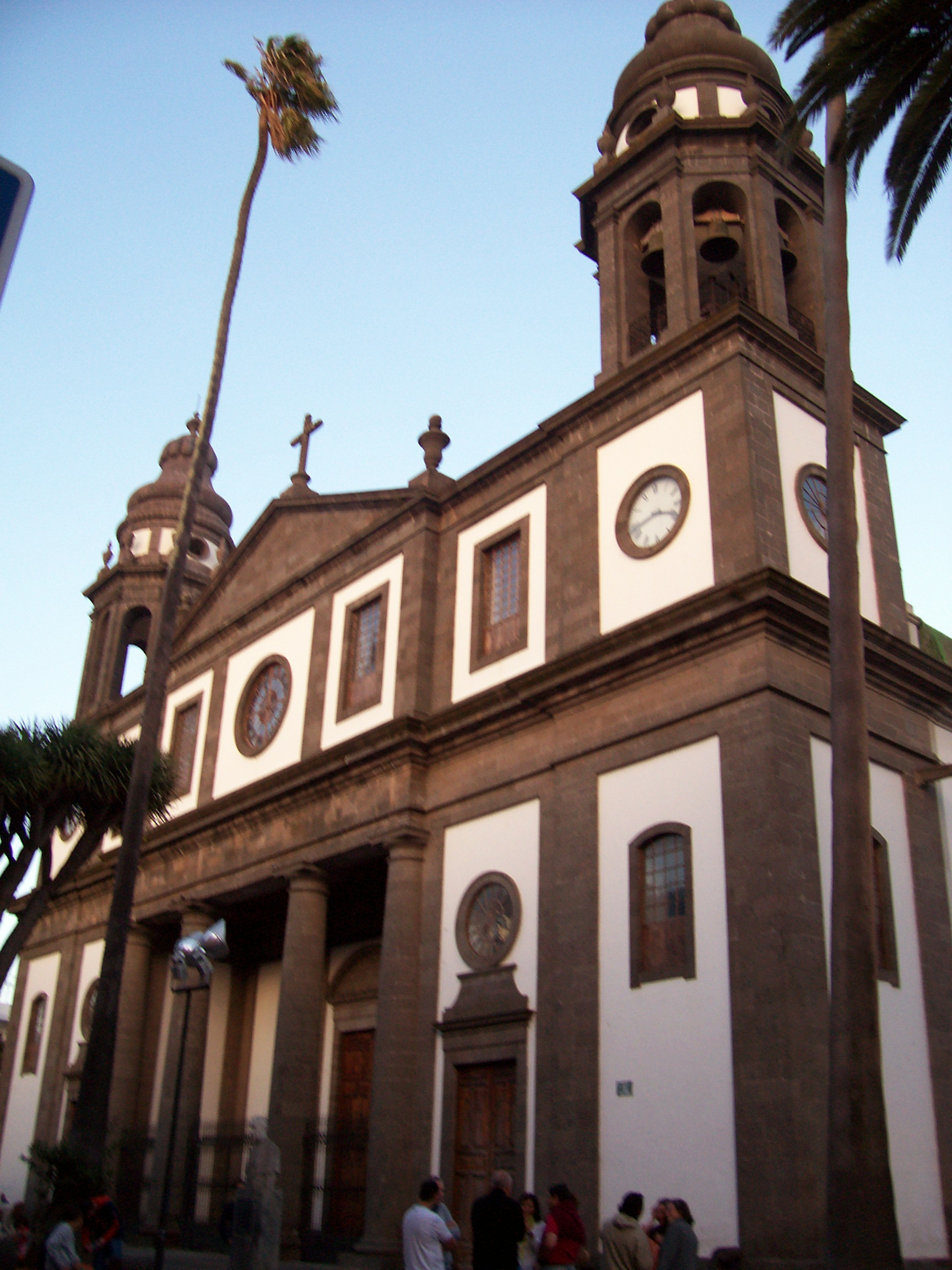
La Laguna Cathedral, place where the processional steps make their penance station.

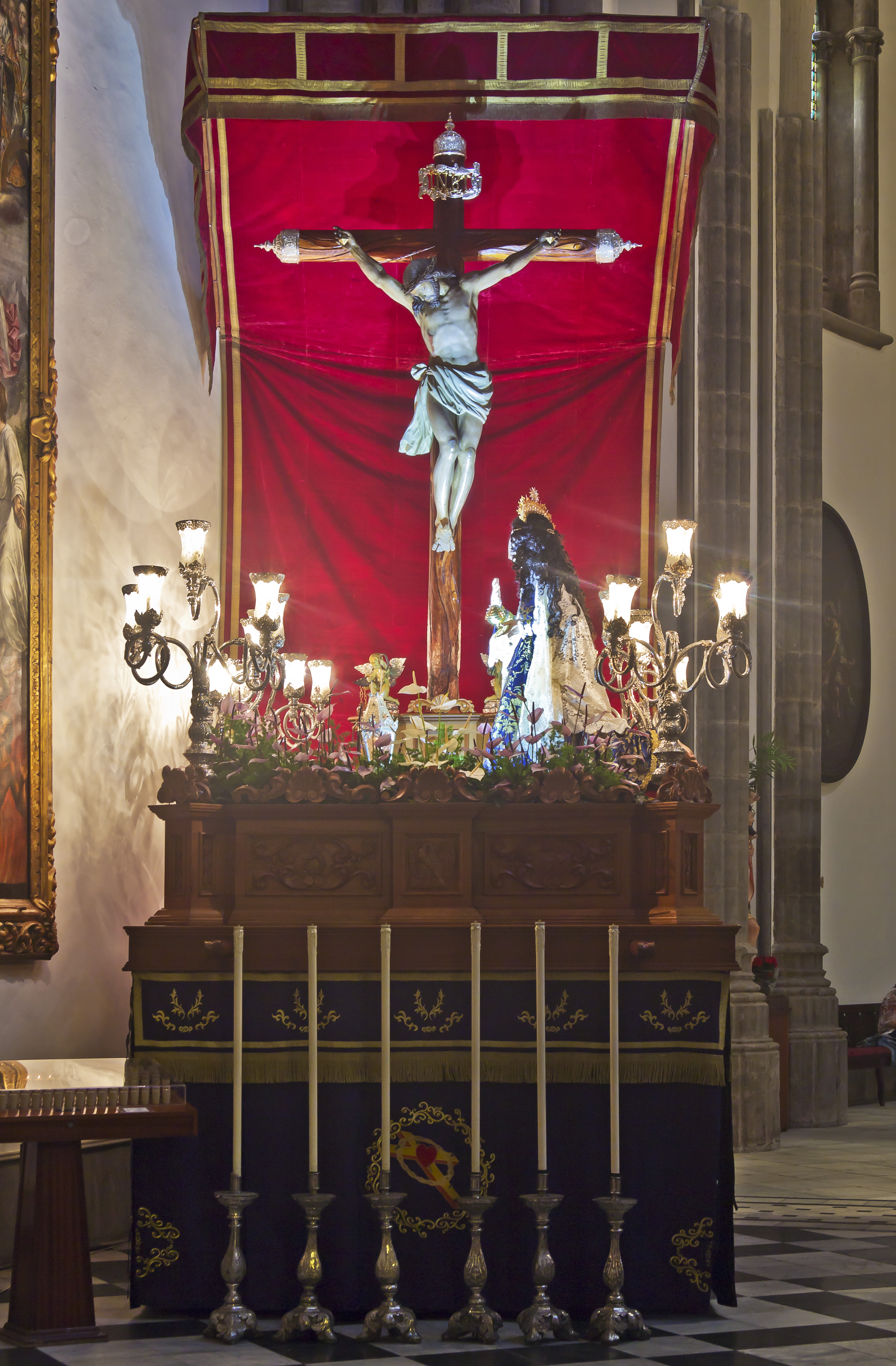
Image of Cristo del Amor Misericordioso inside the Cathedral.

Holy Week in La Laguna has numerous steps of great historical-artistic quality, among them;

- Santo Cristo del Buen Viaje or Cristo del Rescate (anonymous, 16th century)
- Santo Cristo de Burgos (Ezequiel de León, 1987)
- Nuestra Señora de los Dolores (Luján Pérez, 1805)
- Entrada de Jesús en Jerusalén (José Rodríguez de la Oliva, 18th century)
- Nuestro Padre Jesús de la Sentencia (Jaime Babío Núñez, 2004)
- María Santísima de la Amargura (Juan A. González García, 1988)
- Santo Cristo de las Caídas (anonymous from Barcelona, 1953)
- Santo Cristo del Amor Misericordioso (Fernando Estévez, 1828)
- El Señor del Huerto de los Olivos (Luján Pérez, 1805)
- Insignias de la Pasión (anonymous, before 1966)
- El Señor atado a la Columna (Pietro Galleano, 1756)
- Nuestra Señora de las Angustias (Gabriel de Astorga y Miranda, 19th century)
- Santo Cristo de los Remedios (anonymous, 16th century)
- Las lágrimas de San Pedro (Fernando Estévez, 19th century)
- Santa Verónica y la Santa Faz (Ezequiel de León and Juan Ventura, 20th century)
- Nuestro Padre Jesús Nazareno (Casa Burillo, 1901)
- Nuestra Señora de la Soledad (José Rodríguez de la Oliva, 18th century)
- El Señor de la Cañita (Ezequiel de León, 1965)
- La Santa Cena (Antonio de Orbarán, 1664)
- Señor de la Humildad y Paciencia (attributed to Francisco Alonso de la Raya, 17th century)
- Santos Varones y Santa María Magdalena (various authors and centuries: Fernando Estévez, Ibrahim Hernández and anonymous, 17th, 19th and 21st centuries)
- Nuestra Señora de la Soledad de Santo Domingo (anonymous, 16th century)
- El Calvario (various authors and centuries: Francisco Alonso de la Raya, Ezequiel de León and anonymous, 17th, and 20st centuries)
- Nuestra Señora de los Dolores, San Juan y Santa María Magdalena (Canarian school from around 1700 and anonymous images from the 18th century)
- Santísimo Cristo de La Laguna (Louis Van Der Vule, 16th century)
- La Piedad (Lázaro González de Ocampo, 1688)
- Señor Difunto (anonymous, 16th century)
- El Resucitado (Manuel Luque Bonillo, 2002)

== See also ==
- Holy Week in Spain
- San Cristóbal de La Laguna

== Bibliography ==
- Alejandro Cioranescu (1965). La Laguna – Guía Histórica y Monumental (in Spanish). A. Romero S.A.
- Sergio Negrín Sacramento, Sergio; Negrín Sacramento (2014). Semana Santa San Cristóbal de La Laguna (in Spanish). Junta de Hermandades y Cofradías de San Cristóbal de La Laguna.
- Lorenzo Lima, Juan Alejandro (2013). Patrimonio e historia de la antigua Catedral de La Laguna (in Spanish). San Cristóbal de La Laguna.: Ayuntamiento de San Cristóbal de La Laguna. Depósito legal 978-84-7947-625-0.
