= Cabeza de Perro =

Spanish pirate

Ángel García
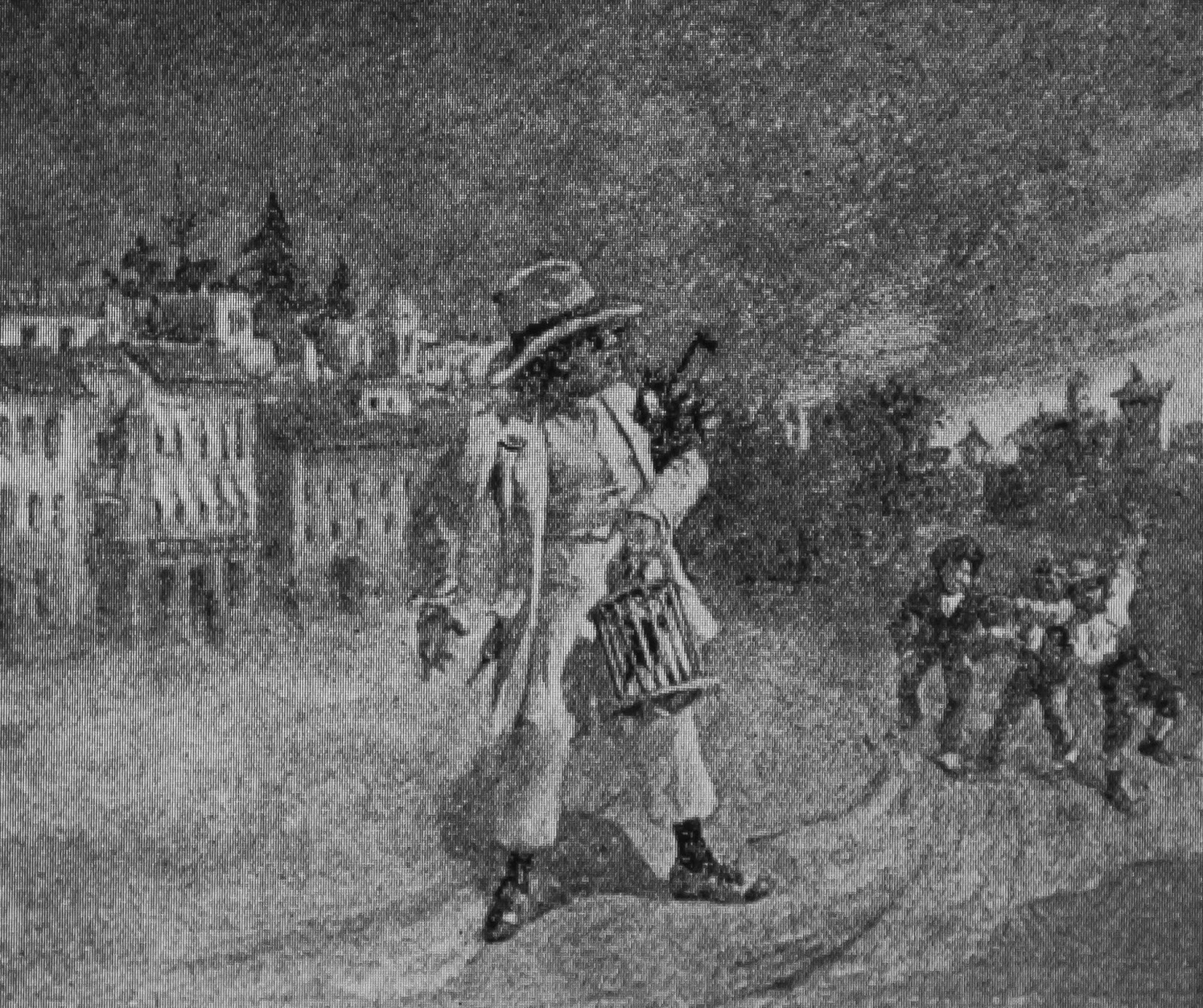
- Born: 1800; Igueste de San Andrés, Tenerife, Spain
- Died: ???? Santa Cruz de Tenerife, Tenerife, Spain
- Piratical career
- Nickname: Cabeza de Perro
- Rank: Pirate
- Base of operations: Caribbean

Ángel García, nicknamed Cabeza de Perro (born c. 1800), was a Spanish pirate. His nickname, "Cabeza de Perro" translates to English as Dog Head.

== Biography ==
Ángel García was born in Igueste de San Andrés, Tenerife, Spain in 1800.

As a pirate he conducted his operations in the Caribbean and lived in the district of San Lázaro, in La Habana, Cuba. His vessel was the brig El Invencible, although he also had others such as El Audaz, which he captured after organizing the killing of her crew.

This ship traveled between Havana to New York. He killed all his crew, except for a woman and her son (or daughter, according to other sources), who had gone into hiding. When both were discovered by the pirate, he threw them into the sea. However, they were rescued by an Italian sailing ship. The woman related the event to the captain and he showed her a portrait of Cabeza de Perro, recognizing him as the author of the massacre.

In the following days, the pirate Cabeza de Perro could not stop thinking about that terrible scene and decided to abandon his pirate activity and return to his homeland to dedicate himself to agriculture.

After arriving in Tenerife, he was arrested at Castillo de Paso Alto in Santa Cruz de Tenerife, where he was executed.

== Historicity ==
Currently it is believed that this pirate is only a character based on Amaro Pargo, since there are no real references either to his activities or to his execution in Tenerife. Yet, there was an offender in the 1920s who took that nickname.

== See also ==
- Amaro Pargo
- List of pirates
