= Amaro Pargo =

Spanish privateer and slave trader (1678–1747)

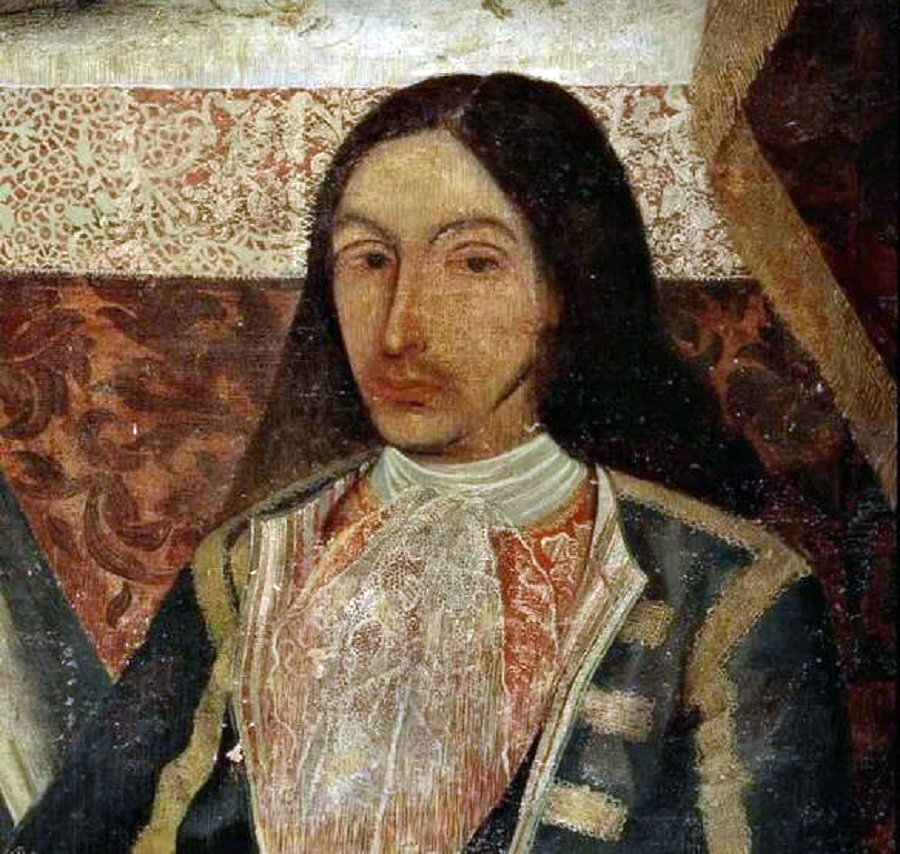
- Born: Amaro Rodríguez-Felipe y Tejera Machado; 3 May 1678; San Cristóbal de La Laguna, Tenerife
- Died: 4 October 1747 (aged 69); San Cristóbal de La Laguna, Tenerife, Crown of Castile
- Piratical career
- Nickname: Amaro Pargo
- Years active: 1712–1729
- Rank: Captain
- Base of operations: Atlantic; West Indies
- Commands: El Bravo, Ave María, El Clavel, Fortuna, etc

Signature
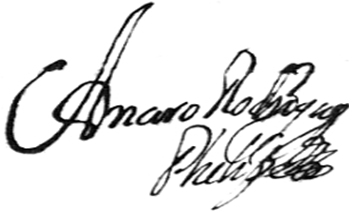

Amaro Rodríguez-Felipe y Tejera Machado (3 May 1678 – 4 October 1747), also known as Amaro Pargo, was a Spanish privateer and merchant. He was one of the most well-known Spanish privateers during the Golden Age of Piracy. Pargo was noted for his commercial activities and for his frequent religious donations and aid to the poor. As a privateer, he targeted trade routes between Cádiz and the Caribbean, on several occasions attacking British and Dutch merchant ships, earning recognition in his time as a hero and coming to be regarded as "the Spanish equivalent of Francis Drake". He was declared a Caballero hidalgo in 1725 and obtained certification of nobility and royal arms in 1727.

== Nickname ==
For years there has been speculation as to the reason behind Rodríguez Felipe's nickname of Pargo. Traditionally, it has been believed that this pseudonym means that the raider was "fast", "elusive in battle" and "moving in the sea as the aforementioned fish", the red porgy (also called Pargo). More recent theories rooted in popular tradition have also attributed the nickname to the facial features of a corsair.

More recently, other theories have emerged; Professor Manuel de Paz at the University of La Laguna and librarian Daniel García Pulido view Rodríguez Felipe's nickname as not having to do with his face resembling a fish, but with the nickname of his family's clan.

== Biography ==
=== Early life ===
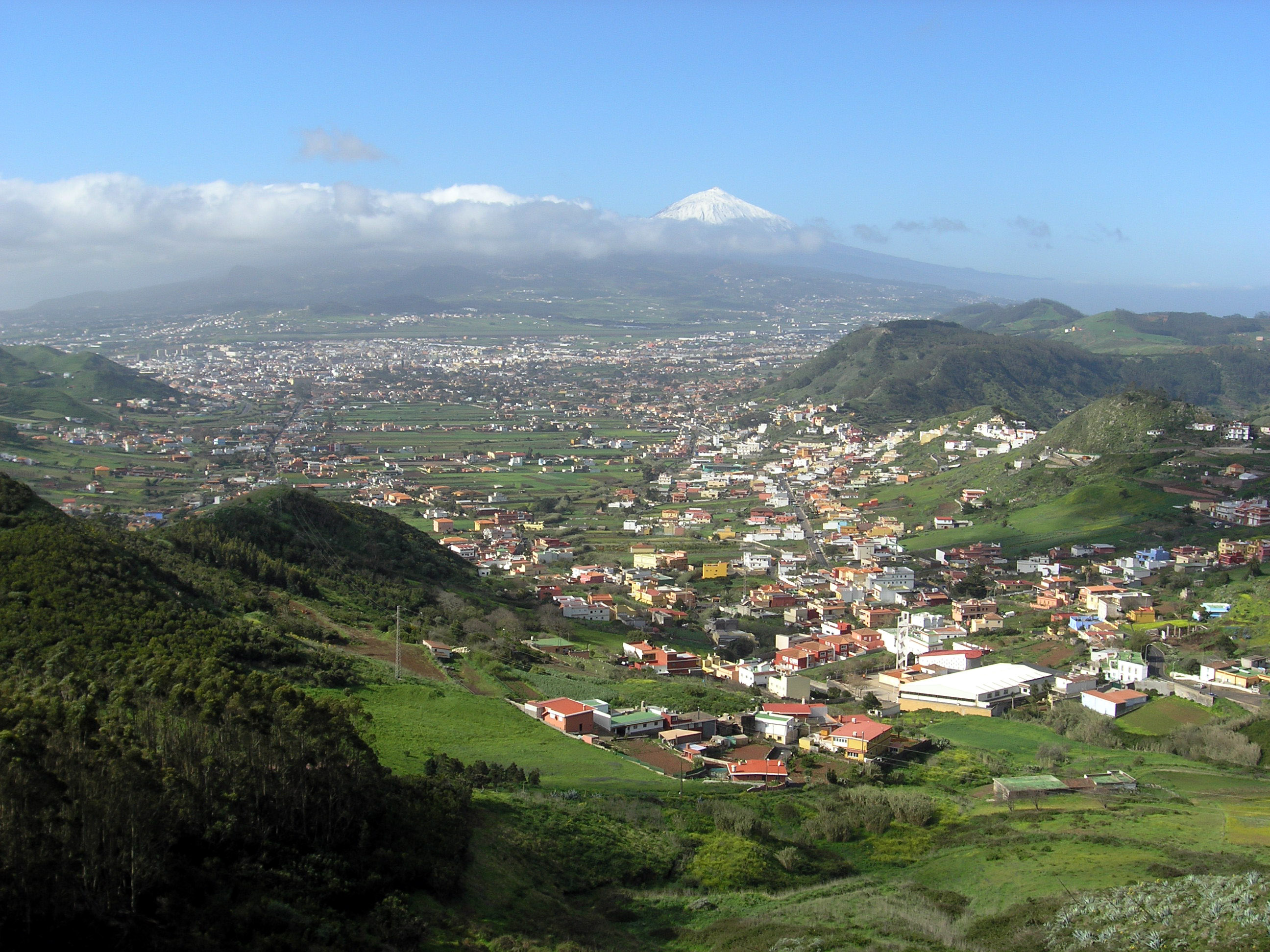
Panoramic view of San Cristóbal de La Laguna, the city where Amaro Pargo was born

Rodríguez Felipe was born in San Cristóbal de La Laguna, on the island of Tenerife in the Canary Islands on 3 May 1678.

He was baptized by the priest Manuel Hurtado Mendoza in the Iglesia de Los Remedios (Church of Our Lady of Los Remedios, today a cathedral in the city). His godfather was Amaro López. He was the son of Juan Rodríguez Felipe and Beatriz Tejera Machado. He had seven brothers. Three of his sisters entered the Convent of Santa Catalina de Siena in the city. His family was affluent, possessing property both in and around the city.

Amaro lived with his family in the Plaza de San Cristóbal in La Laguna (also called "Plaza Tanque de Abajo"). The family had several possessions and houses, most of them located close to the political, economic, and religious center of the city, around the current Plaza del Adelantado (then called "Plaza de Abajo").

In 1701 he boarded as second lieutenant on a ship, the Ave María, nicknamed La Chata ("The Barge"), which was boarded by pirates. This ship was a galley of the King of Spain then on the route between the Caribbean and Cadiz. He advised the captain to feign surrender in order to start a battle from which they emerged victorious. In gratitude, the captain gave Amaro his first ship. With it he began his business activities, including participation in the Atlantic slave trade in Spanish America. For this, Amaro Pargo obtained a letter of marque from King Philip V of Spain.

=== Trader and privateer ===
Amaro Pargo's participation in the Spanish treasure fleet had to have started between 1703 and 1705, and at this time he is mentioned as "captain" and "master" of the frigate Ave María y Las Ánimas. He is mentioned sailing between the port of Santa Cruz de Tenerife and Havana, and other vessels of their possession are cited; Nuestra Señora de Los Remedios, Santo Domingo and Santa Águeda (this last nicknamed El Gavilán). In 1737, he is mentioned as the owner of El Mercader de Canarias, captained by John Plunket, and as sharing ownership with another merchant vessel of La Laguna, Don Pedro Dujardin.

He conducted his affairs with a well-maintained fleet and also with many residences. Amaro Pargo led his own ships to America laden with wine from Malvasía (from his own vineyards) and brandy (also his), which he sold in Havana and Guyana. On the way, he attacked all ships belonging to nations at war with Spain, most of whom were British and Dutch, making off with booty which he later brought back to Spain. Pargo also fought against some of the best known pirates of his day, including Blackbeard. He also traded in other products such as various textiles and nuts. These products were brought from the Canary Islands to the Indies.

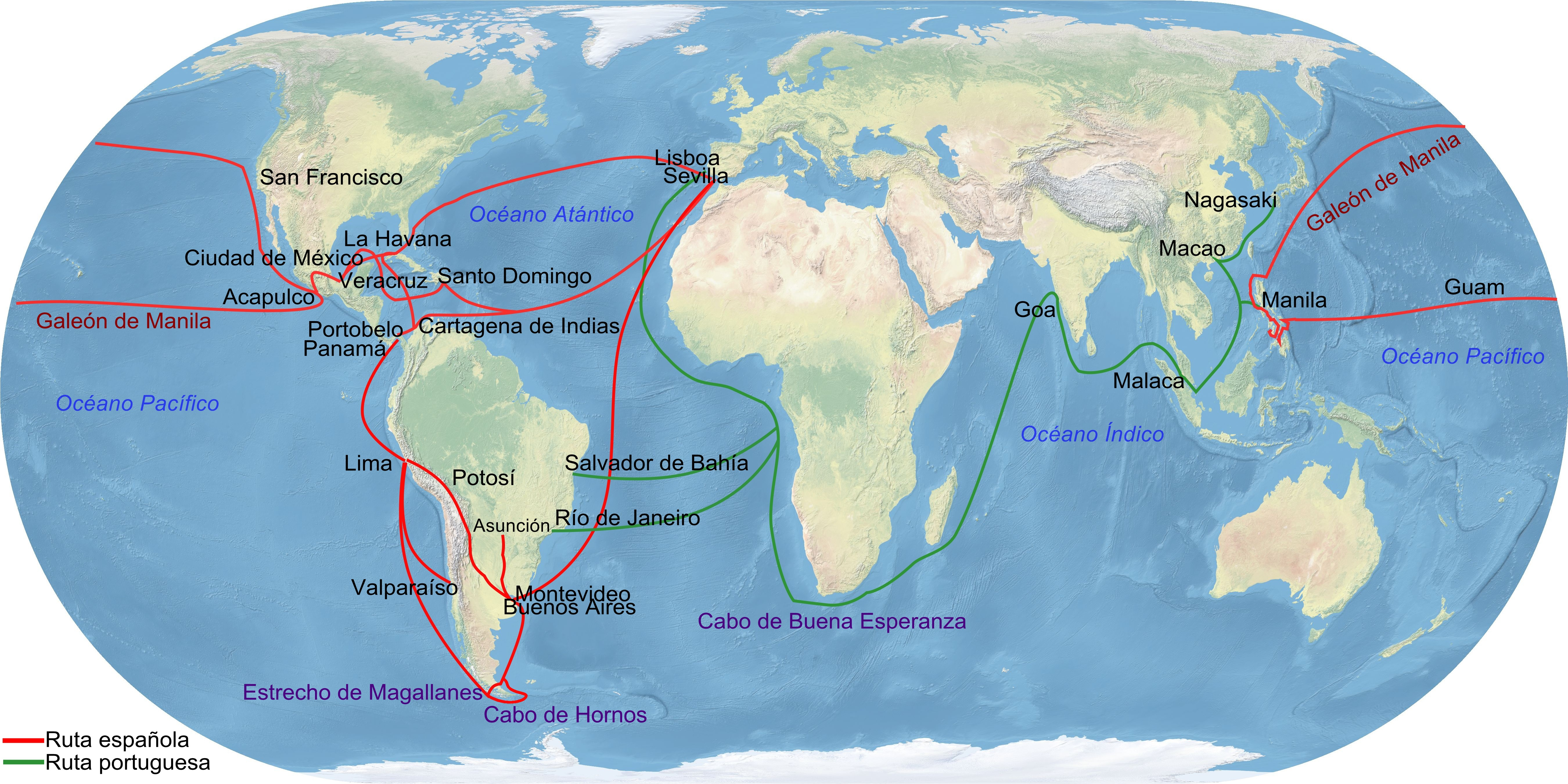
Main commercial routes of the Spanish Empire with the Indies (in red). Amaro Pargo used the route that crossed the Atlantic and went to the Caribbean.

In 1712, Pargo captured the British-flagged merchant ship Saint Joseph, which operated out of Dublin and was commanded by Captain Alexander Westher. Pargo was later accused of not having acted with rigor at the time of exercising his rights as a privateer. This was because Pargo looted the ship's cargo and forced Westher to sail with Pargo's ship to the port of Santa Cruz de Tenerife on pain of sinking Saint Joseph if Westher refused to do so. Nevertheless, the capture of Saint Joseph was considered legitimate because Britain was at war with Spain.

The Spanish monarch Felipe V, in a Royal Decree dated 24 October 1719 in San Lorenzo de El Escorial, authorized Amaro Pargo to build a ship in Campeche. This ship was a merchant vessel armed with 58 guns and 64 cubits long and 56 keel, with more than 16 manga. According to current studies, said ship became part of the Navy in 1723, but just a year before it had captured and looted the Dutch merchant ship Duyvelant, when it was believed to have been captained by Pargo.

This systematic looting of enemy ships sometimes escalated into battle; it is documented that once Amaro Pargo boarded a great ship from Jamaica, triggering a clash between the privateer Snapper and the captain of the ship with sabers and pistols, which ended with the captain seriously wounded and Pargo with only a cut on his fingers. He also fought against Barbary pirates in waters off the Canary Islands.

Pargo became romantically involved with the Cuban Josefa María del Valdespino, with whom he had an illegitimate son, but did not marry. This son was named Manuel de la Trinidad Rodríguez. Another illegitimate son was Juan Rodríguez Felipe, born in Santa Cruz de Tenerife and eventually buried in the parish of St. Mark in Tegueste. According to the documents of the time, Juan Rodríguez's mother was a married woman who had known Amaro's family since childhood. This offspring would, however, be raised by the mother of Amaro Pargo, Mrs. Beatriz Tejera.

Amaro Pargo founded a chaplaincy for the needy and allocated 3,000 reales for the poor in the prisons. Pargo eventually came to be the richest man in the Canary Islands. He was a character who in his day had the same reputation and popularity as that of Blackbeard and Francis Drake.

=== Access to the nobility ===
On 25 January 1725 Amaro Pargo was declared Caballero hijodalgo. In addition, Pargo obtained the actual certification of Nobility and Arms also given in Madrid on 9 January 1727 by Juan Antonio de Hoces Sarmiento, who was chronicler and king of arms of Felipe V of Spain.

=== Friendship with Sister Mary of Jesus ===
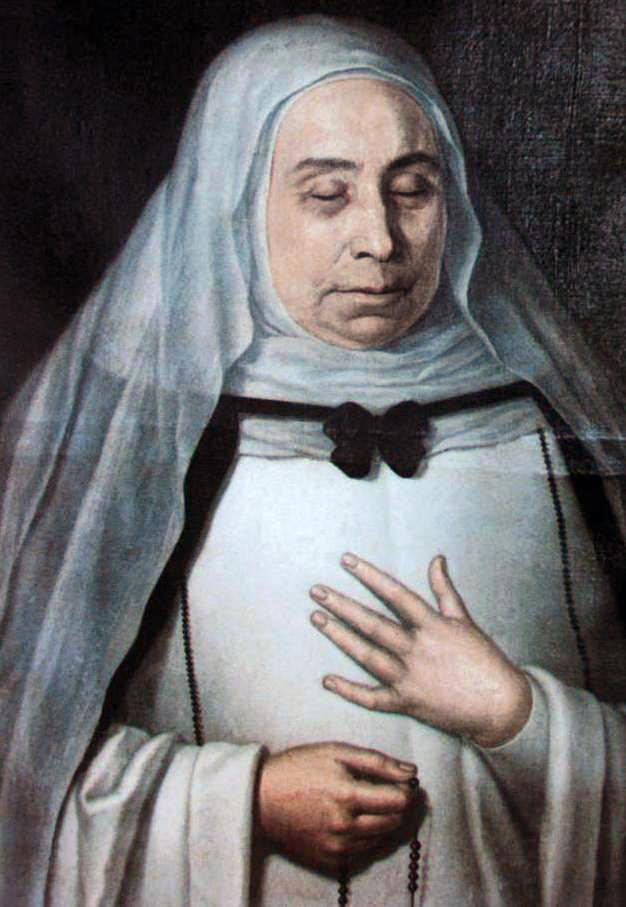
Sister Mary of Jesus, the spiritual adviser of Amaro Pargo

Because of his fervent Catholic beliefs, Amaro made large donations to churches, religious institutions, and the Parroquia de Nuestra Señora de Los Remedios (Parish Church of Our Lady of Los Remedios), now the Catedral de San Cristóbal de La Laguna (La Laguna Cathedral). He developed a deep friendship with Dominican nun María de León Bello y Delgado, the famed "Sister Mary of Jesus", who gave the privateer spiritual advice. After her 1731 death, Amaro paid for the extravagant sarcophagus in which her incorrupted body was placed. Amaro's initials are inscribed in the sarcophagus.

The privateer attributed many of his exploits to the miraculous intervention of the nun, including an episode in which the nun reportedly saved his life in Cuba, without her body leaving the convent; that is, by the phenomenon of bilocation.

Those searching for romance have over the centuries wanted to see deeper meaning in the friendship between the privateer and the nun who was 25 years his elder. Balbina Rivero, author of Amaro Pargo, el pirata de Tenerife, suggests that interpretation in his book. Others reject it, including the author of El Sarcófago de las tres llaves, Pompeyo Reina Moreno, saying their friendship was based on devotional reasons.

=== Death and inheritance ===
Amaro died 4 October 1747 in his hometown. According to chronicles, his funeral was "very solemn" and the funeral procession transferring his body to his burial site made eight stops on the street, slowed down by the crowd that accompanied the procession.

He was buried in the family tomb in the Santo Domingo de Guzmán Convent in La Laguna. The family shield is engraved in the marble headstone, and under it a skull with two crossbones winks his right eye.

His estate at his death was substantial, and his natural son Manuel de la Trinidad Rodríguez appeared in La Laguna demanding his part, but the rest of his heirs rejected his claims.

== Treasure of Amaro Pargo ==
Pargo wrote in his will that he had a box that he kept in his cabin. This carved chest contained silver, gold jewelry, pearls and precious stones of great value, chinese porcelain, rich fabrics and paintings, adding that they were itemised in a book wrapped in parchment and marked with the letter "D". The whereabouts of this book are unknown.

In the centuries since, people have speculated as to the whereabouts of the treasure. The house of Amaro Pargo in Machado (in the municipality of El Rosario) was sacked over the years by treasure hunters. It has also been suggested that the treasure is in the so-called Cave of San Mateo in Punta del Hidalgo northeast of Tenerife, a cave that served to hide their loot. Despite many search efforts, the treasure has not yet been located.

== Exhumation ==
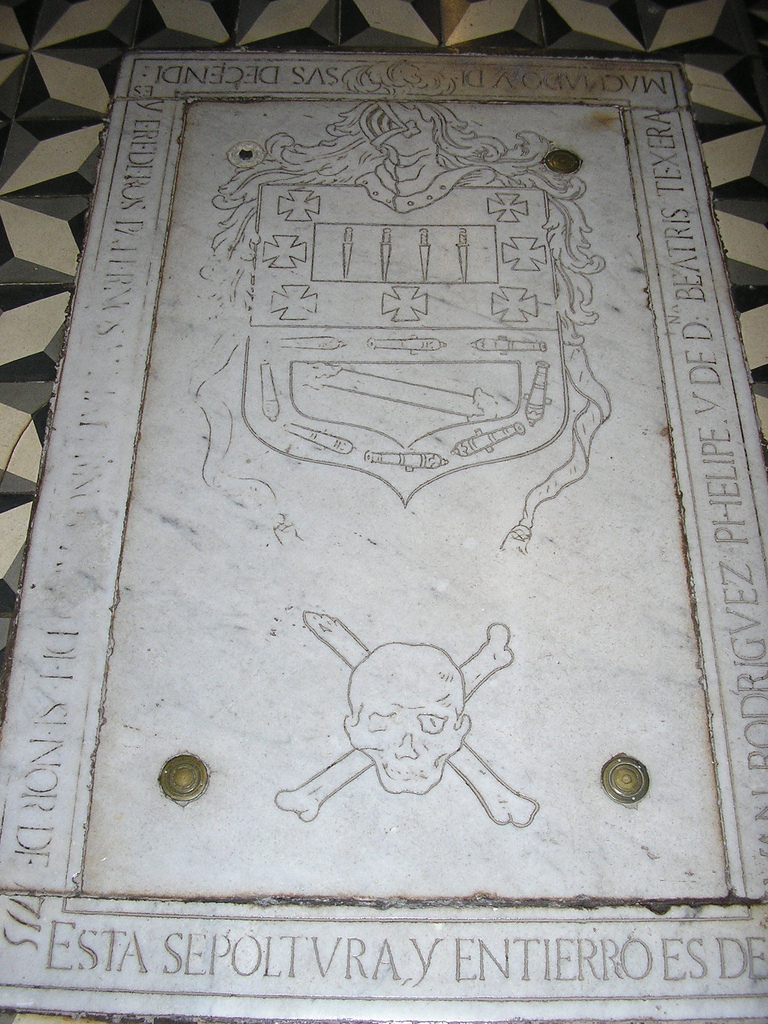
Amaro Pargo's tomb in the Church of Santo Domingo, which highlights the skull and crossbones. Pargo's coat of arms is visible above.

In November 2013, an exhumation was carried out by a team of archaeologists and forensic scientists from the Autonomous University of Madrid to facilitate a study on the pirate, including DNA tests and the recreation of his face.

According to historical records, Pargo was buried alongside his parents and a black servant. The tomb was found, however, to also contain six more people, as well as some incomplete remains of babies. It is believed that some of these people were nephews or great nephews of Amaro Pargo, while the babies were found to not be related to the privateer. They may have been buried together with Pargo due to a custom all over Spain and the Canary Islands to bury unbaptized children next to an adult, in the belief that the adult would guide them to Heaven.

The exhumation was funded by the French video game company Ubisoft to promote the sixth installment of their Assassin's Creed video game series, Assassin's Creed IV: Black Flag, and Naughty Dog's popular gaming franchise Uncharted. According to a supervisor of the company, Pargo was "a character who in his time had the same reputation and popularity as Blackbeard or Francis Drake".

== In popular culture ==
=== Literature ===
Pargo's mercantile and piratical activities have attracted the interest of several novelists and historians. El corsario Amaro Pargo by Domingo Barbuzano is noted for its historical accuracy, as Barbuzano spent five years to investigating Pargo in historical archives of the Indies in Seville, where all documentation of travel between Spain and America was kept. Amaro Pargo was a main character in Alexander De Chastelaine's novel Black Sam, where the benevolent privateer Pargo offered Samuel Bellamy and his pirate crew refuge at his home shores on the Canary Islands.

Among the novels inspired by him are Amaro Pargo, el pirata de Tenerife by Balbina Rivero, and El Sarcófago de las Tres Llaves by Pompeyo Reina, and the Argentine writer Ernesto Frers makes reference to Amaro Pargo in his work Más allá del legado pirata.

=== Film and television ===
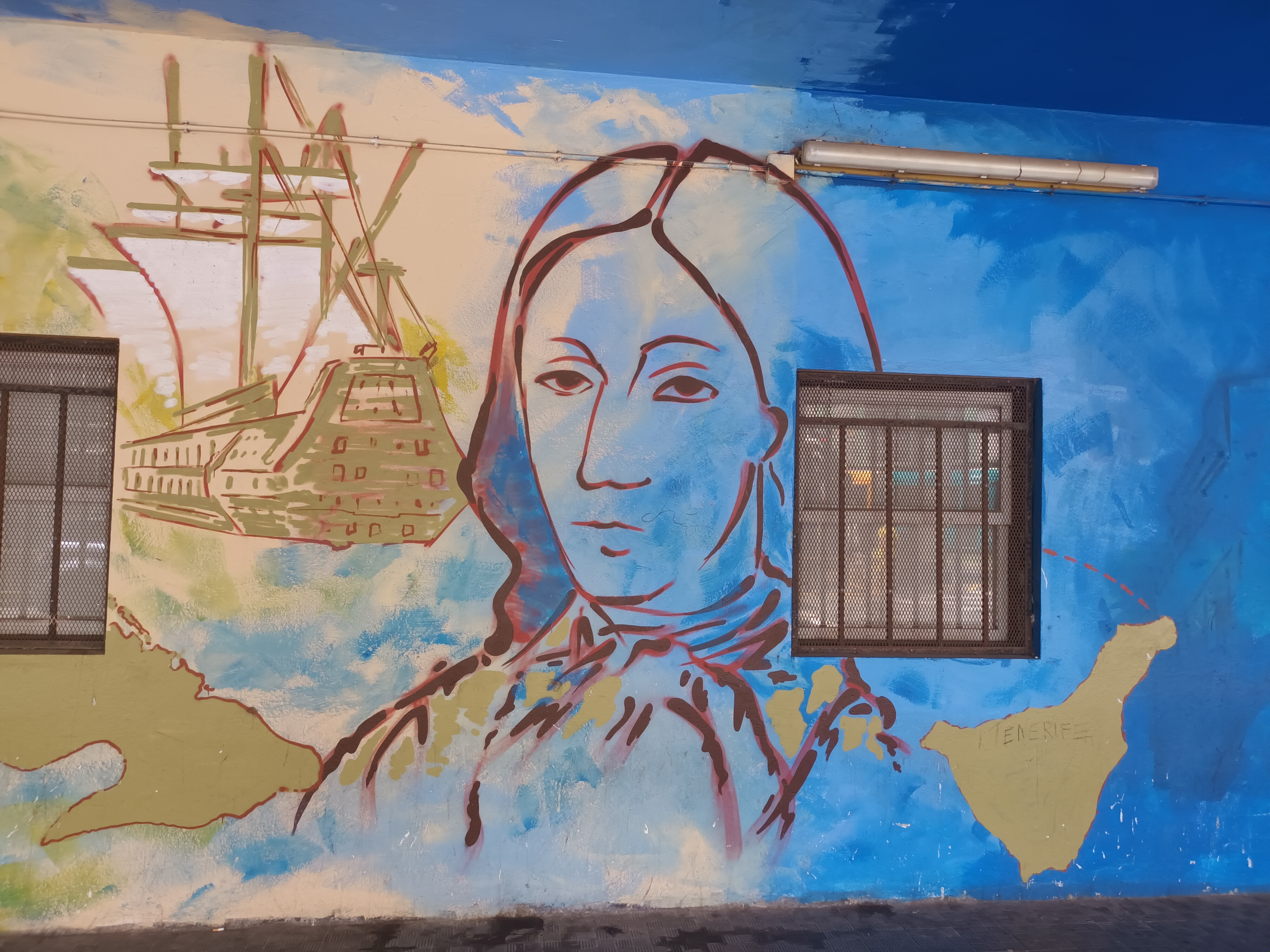
Mural painting representing Pargo located in San Cristóbal de La Laguna, Tenerife.

In 1989, Televisión Española en Canarias broadcast a television series called La historia en persona. This series consisted of thirteen episodes, one of which was dedicated to the figure of Amaro Pargo.

More recently in 2017, the first documentary film that analyzes different vital aspects of this historical character was filmed, which is entitled Amaro Pargo: entre la leyenda y la historia. This documentary was broadcast directly on television in August 2017 through Televisión Canaria.

In 2023, the American television series Expedition Unknown dedicated a chapter to the figure of Amaro Pargo with the title "Riches of Spain's Pirate King".

=== Music and theater ===
The musical group Rincón de La Mareta dedicated a song to Pargo in 2016. In it, composed by Raquel Álvarez, the story of Amaro Pargo, his fortune and his passage through Cuba is narrated.

In the theatrical play La Conquista más pirata of Timaginas Teatro, Amaro Pargo shares the limelight with Rear Admiral Horacio Nelson, the Catholic Monarchs and Alonso Fernández de Lugo.

In the year 2022, in the month of May, coinciding with Amaro's birth anniversary, an album dedicated entirely to his figure called El Corsario de Aguere is released, under the direction and musical production of Raquel Álvarez.

=== Others ===
In 2017, the Ruta Gastronómica de Amaro Pargo was presented in the city of La Laguna, a gastronomic route set in 18th-century cuisine and inspired by the figure of Pargo.

The City Council of San Cristóbal de La Laguna launched in 2021 an interactive video game entitled El tesoro de Amaro Pargo, which allows you to discover the main historical-artistic values of this city, declared a World Heritage Site by UNESCO in 1999.

== See also ==
- Cabeza de Perro
- Miguel Enríquez (privateer)

== Bibliography ==
- Frers, Ernesto (2008). Más allá del Legado Pirata. Robinbooks. ISBN 978-84-7927963-9.
- García Barbusano, Domingo (2004). El corsario Amaro Pargo. Excmo. Ayuntamiento de La Laguna. ISBN 978-84-88919-86-1.
- Macías Martín, Francisco (2015). El corsario de Dios. Documentos sobre el corsario Amaro Rodríguez Felipe (1678–1747). Viceconsejería de Cultura y Deportes del Gobierno de Canarias. ISBN 978-84-7947-637-3.
- Pallés Darias, Beatriz (2016). Amaro Pargo. Caballero de los mares. Le Canarien Ediciones. ISBN 978-84-946282-2-1.
- Reina Moreno, Pompeyo (2013). El Sarcófago de las tres llaves. La leyenda del tesoro del corsario Amaro Pargo. Idea. ISBN 978-84-9941-961-9.
- Rivero, Balbina (2014). Amaro Pargo, el pirata de Tenerife. Colección Yorca. ISBN 978-92-10-08678-3.
