= José Rodríguez de la Oliva =

Spanish painter and sculptor (1695–1777)

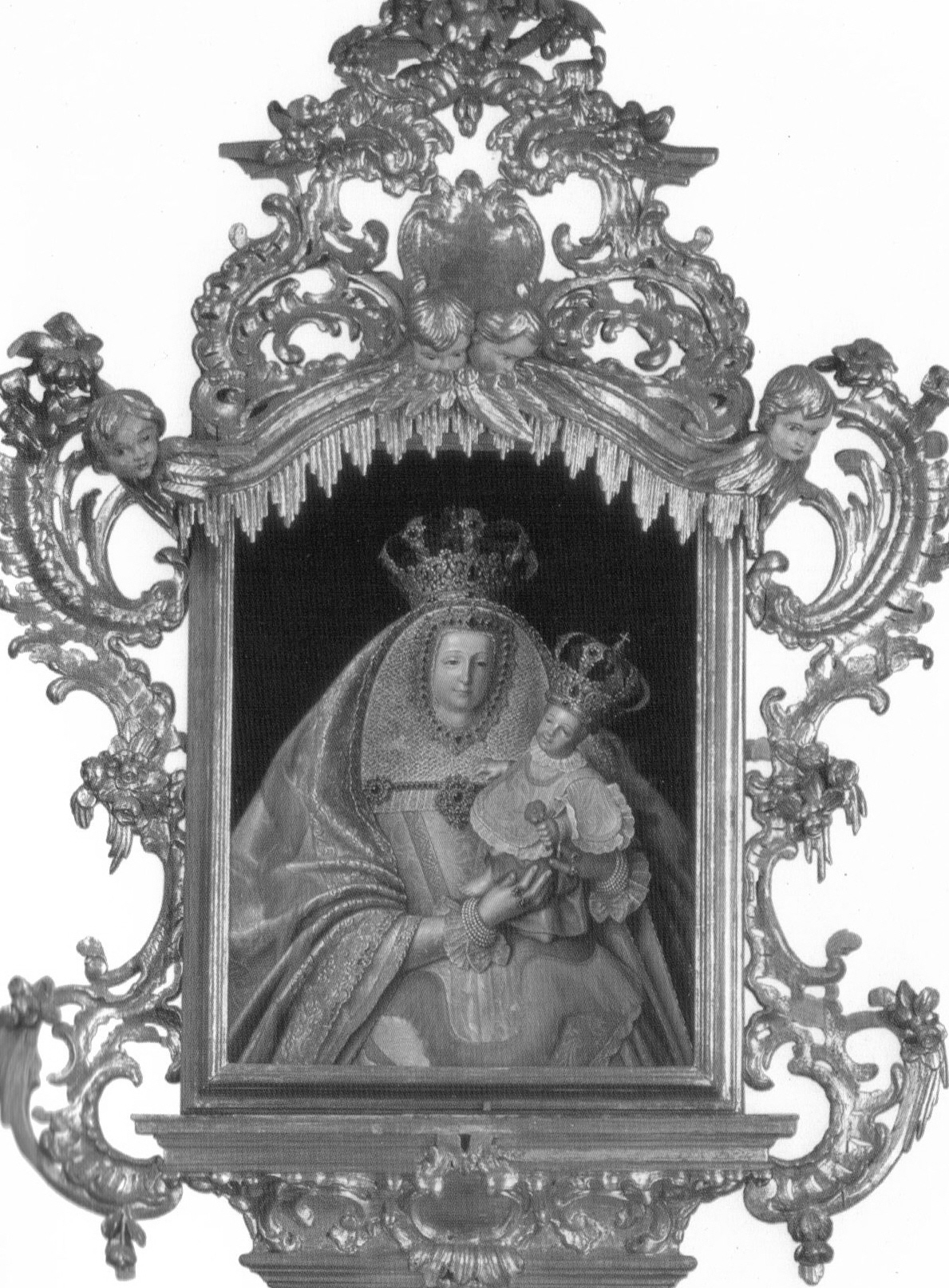
Painting depicting the Virgin of the Pine at the Cathedral of Santa Ana, Las Palmas de Gran Canaria. This painting was made by José Rodríguez de la Oliva.

José Rodríguez de la Oliva was a Spanish sculptor of the 18th-century from San Cristóbal de La Laguna, Tenerife. He was one of the most important sculptors of the Canary Islands. He was known as "El Moño" (The Top Knot).

== Biography ==
He was born on 15 December 1695 in the city of San Cristóbal de La Laguna (Tenerife).

Among his sculptures highlights the image of Our Lady of Remedios, in the Parish of San Marcos in Tegueste. In terms of silverware includes the design of the Custody of the Church of Santo Domingo in La Laguna.

Also really stand out as effigies representing the Virgin of Candelaria (patron saint of the Canary Islands) and the Virgin of the Pine. In the Royal Convent of Our Lady of Candelaria site in the town of Candelaria in Tenerife (next to the Basilica of Candelaria), include images representing St. Dominic, St. Catherine of Siena and St. Peter of Verona taken by him. José Rodríguez de la Oliva also made a portrait "Post mortem" of The Servant of God, Sor Mary of Jesus de León y Delgado. It is also known that he made a portrait in life of the corsair Amaro Pargo, although this work is missing today.

José Rodríguez de la Oliva died on 27 November 1777 in his hometown of San Cristóbal de La Laguna. He was buried in the former Parish of Our Lady of Remedios, now Cathedral of San Cristóbal de La Laguna.

It is considered one of the three great artists of sacred art of Tenerife with Fernando Estévez and Cristóbal Hernández de Quintana. In addition, José Rodríguez de la Oliva was one of the most lavish painters and sculptors in the history of the Canary Islands.

== Other data ==
In addition to his artistic side, José Rodríguez de la Oliva was an important military. On 6 June 1743 he was declared by royal decree Lieutenant in the Regiment of Outsiders and on 4 December 1747 reached the rank of Captain by royal patent.
