= Lázaro González de Ocampo =

Spanish sculptor

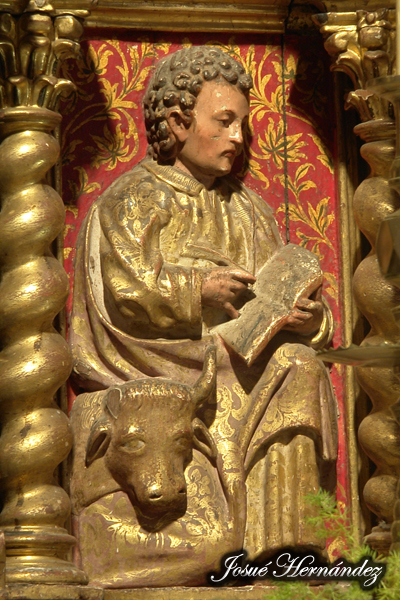
Ocampo's relief of Saint Luke on the altarpiece of Nuestra Señora de la Inmaculada Concepción, La Orotava, Tenerife

Lázaro González de Ocampo was a Spanish sculptor of the 18th century from Tenerife. He is considered one of the island's most noted sculptors.
