= Punta del Hidalgo =

Coordinates: 28°34′05″N 16°19′35″W

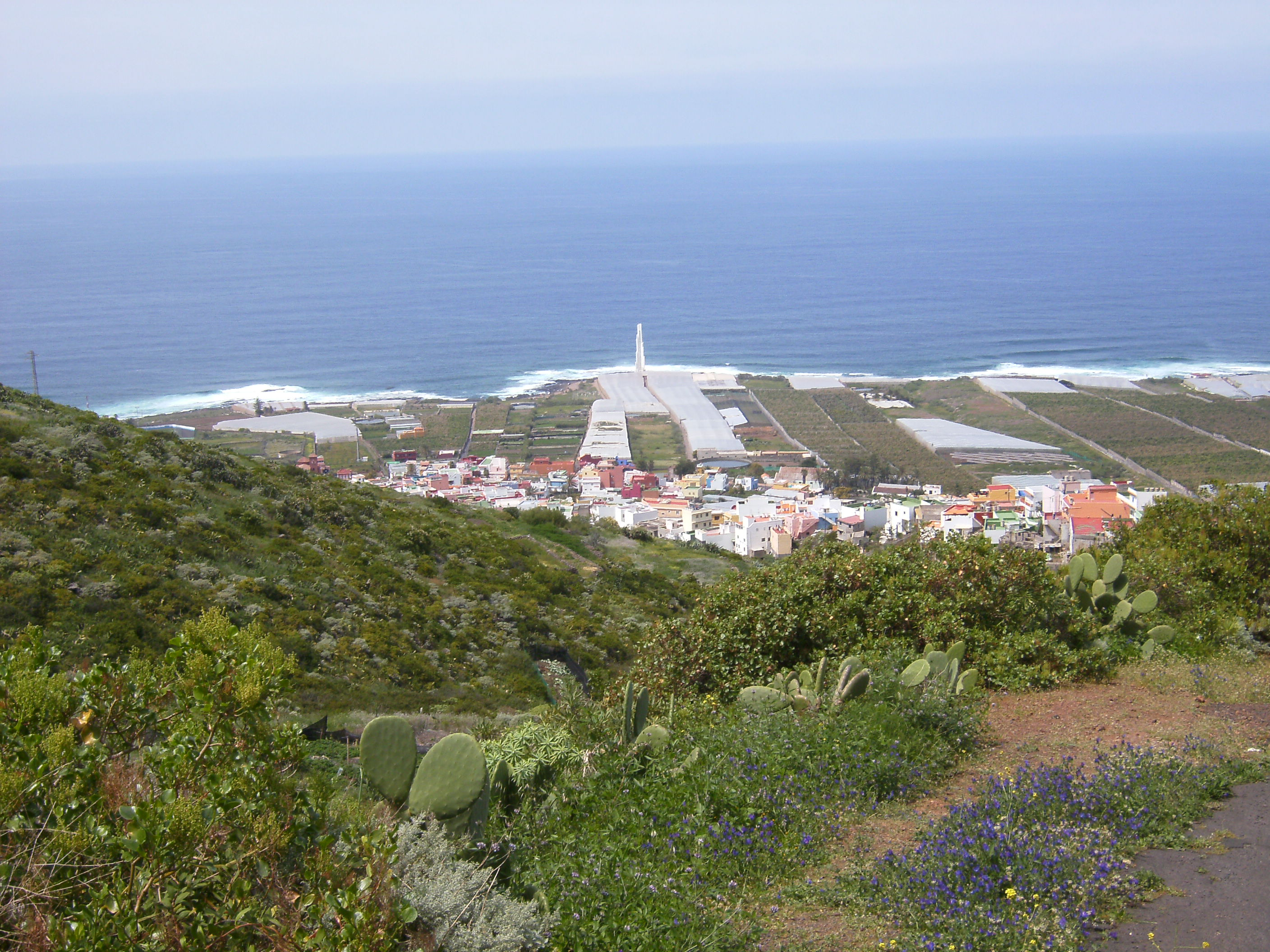
View of Punta del Hidalgo, Tenerife

Punta del Hidalgo is a small fishing village in the municipality of San Cristóbal de La Laguna, Tenerife, Canary Islands.

== See also ==
- Punta del Hidalgo Lighthouse
