= Fernando Estévez (sculptor) =

Spanish sculptor

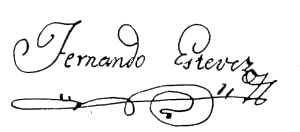
Fernando Estévez signature

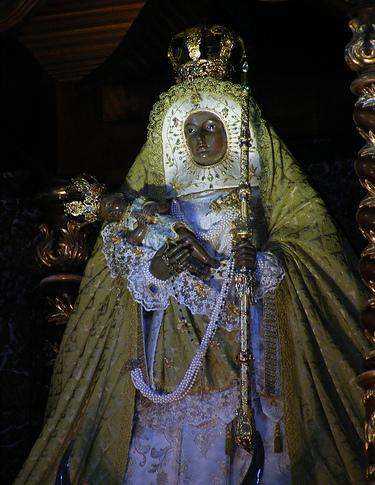
Virgin of Candelaria, Saint Patron of the Canary Islands.

Fernando Estévez was a Spanish sculptor of the 18th century from La Orotava, Tenerife. He is considered one of the Canary Islands most noted sculptors.

It is known for being the creator of the image of the Virgin of Candelaria, patron saint of the Canary Islands.

== Biography ==
Fernando Estévez was born in 1788 in La Orotava, northern town of the island of Tenerife, where his father had its own silver workshop at your home address. From his earliest years, Fernando showed innate talent for plastic art, using knowledge of silverware but above all in the design.

Apart from the artistic home, Fernando had a great vocation to evoke in the urban landscape artist. The first artistic training was received by Fernando Estévez in the Franciscan monastery of San Lorenzo, in La Orotava. There he met the painter, sculptor and architect Jose Luján Pérez, so he worked in his studio in Las Palmas de Gran Canaria until 1808 in which Fernando Estévez opened his own workshop in La Orotava. In 1846 he opened a workshop in Santa Cruz de Tenerife. Thereafter, he also taught at the Provincial Academy of Fine Arts.

== Works ==
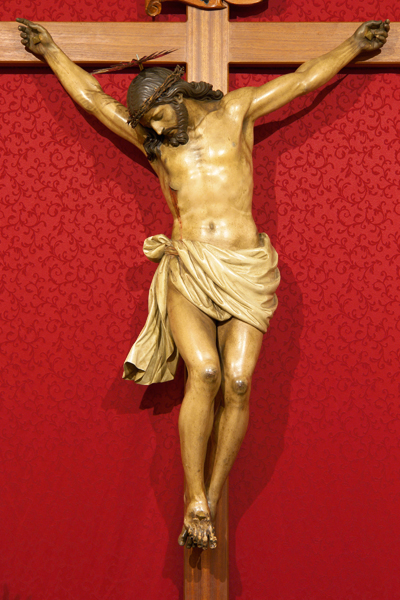
Christ crucified of the Chapter house of the Cathedral of La Laguna.

His sculptures represent exclusively religious themes. Among his most important works in Tenerife include the sculpture of the Christ crucified found in the Chapter house of the Cathedral of La Laguna. Also, the image representing the arrest of Jesus in the Garden of Olives in Church of Nuestra Señora de la Concepción (San Cristóbal de La Laguna) and the Immaculate Conception which is in the same church. His most famous work is undoubtedly the Virgin of Candelaria (patron saint of the Canary Islands) created in 1827 to replace the original image that disappeared in 1826 after a storm.

In other islands they include other works by him: In Santa Cruz de La Palma the Christ of Forgiveness and the Virgin of Carmen that they are in the Church of the Savior. In Lanzarote, he highlights the image of the Virgin of Candelaria is the Church of San Roque in Tinajo. On the island of Gran Canaria include images of the Virgin of the Rosary (Church of Santo Domingo, Las Palmas de Gran Canaria) and St. John the Baptist at the St. John the Baptist Basilica in Telde.

== Honours ==
- Fernando Estévez is considered Hijo Ilustre of La Orotava.
- The main art school in the Canary Islands named after him: Escuela de Arte y Superior de Diseño Fernando Estévez is located in Santa Cruz de Tenerife.
