= Iglesia de Santo Domingo de Guzmán (San Cristóbal de La Laguna) =

Church of Saint Dominic
- Iglesia de Santo Domingo de Guzmán
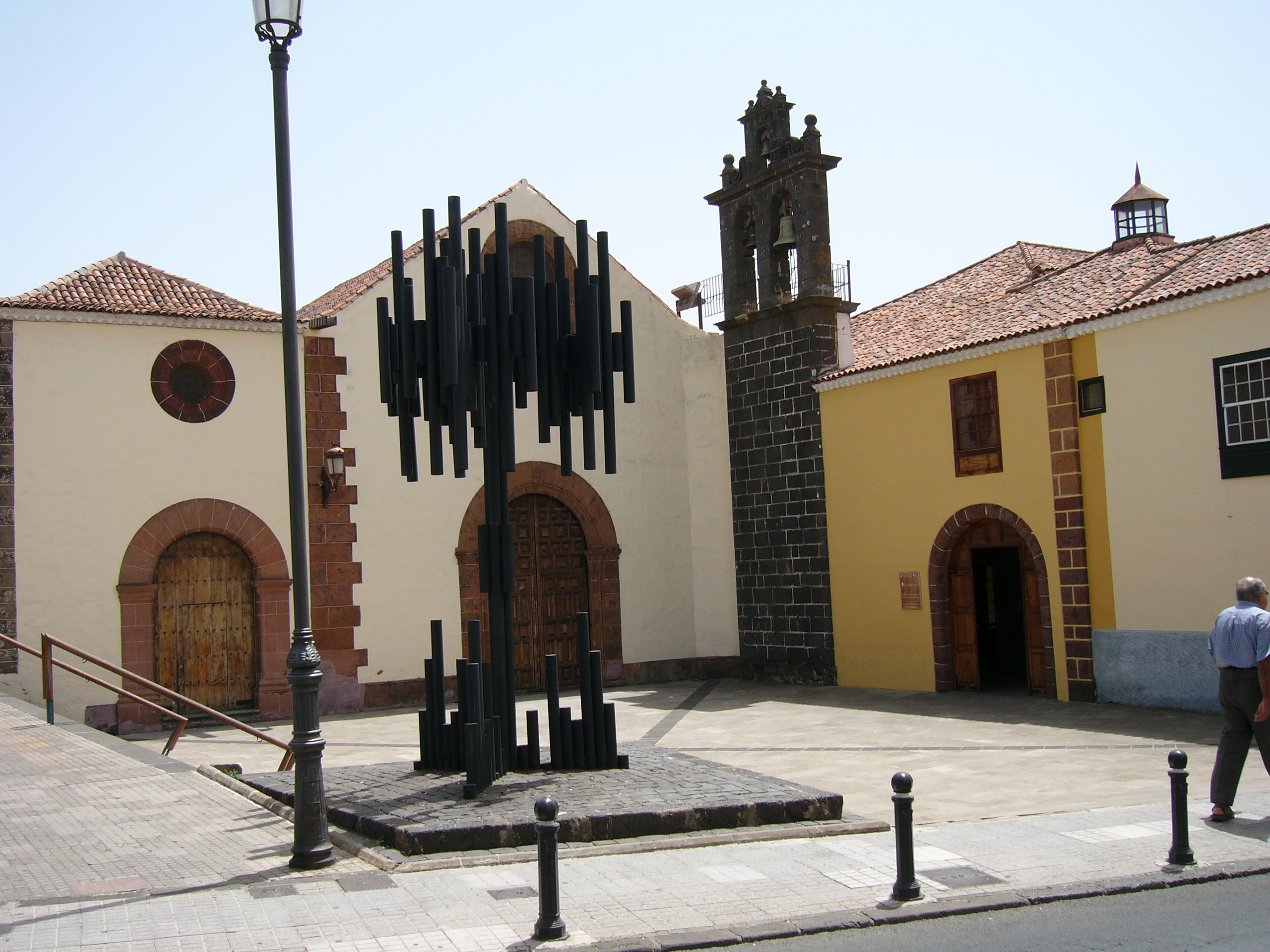
- The church in 2005

- Location within Canary Islands
- 28°29′09″N 16°18′48″W
- Location: San Cristóbal de La Laguna
- Country: Spain
- Denomination: Roman Catholic Church

Architecture
- Functional status: Active
- Completed: 1522 (Monastery); 1527 (Church)

Administration
- Archdiocese: San Cristóbal de La Laguna

The Iglesia de Santo Domingo de Guzmán (Church of the Saint Dominic of Guzmán) is a Roman Catholic church located in the city of San Cristóbal de La Laguna (Tenerife, Canary Islands, Spain).

== History ==
Where the church now stands, there used to be a simple chapel dedicated to the Immaculate Conception. In 1522, the convent of the Dominican friars was established, and in 1527, the church built.

In the Dominican monastery, the image of the Virgin of Candelaria (patron saint of the Canary Islands) was kept when it left the town of Candelaria for the first time on 30 January 1555. This first transfer occurred out of fear of French raids, such as had occurred earlier along the coast.

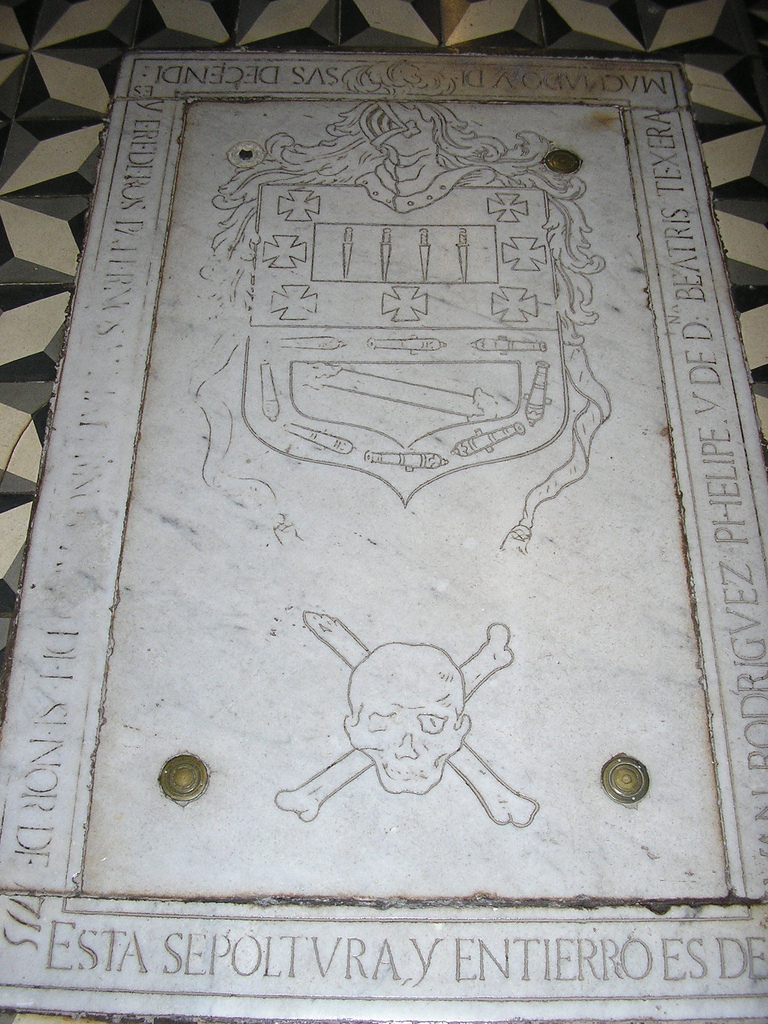
Amaro Pargo tomb in the Church of Santo Domingo, which highlights the skull and crossbones.

In 1612, a chair of theology was created, contributing to the expansion and importance of the convent, which also came to have a public library. In 1747, the famous corsair Amaro Pargo was buried in this church. The corsair had been a patron of the church and had donated several works of art, like the silver throne of the deceased Jesus. The marble gravestone of the corsair is located at the entrance of the church, displaying his family crest, as well as his pirate symbol, a skull and crossbones.

In addition, the church contains the baptismal font on which St. José de Anchieta was baptized in a different church in the parish of Virgin of Los Remedios (now the cathedral of the city). Anchieta founded the city of São Paulo, and was one of the founders of Rio de Janeiro in Brazil.

In the main altar stands the chapel of Our Lady of the Rosary, which was possibly brought to the island of Tenerife by the Dominican friar Pedro de Santa María de Ulloa, although there are indications that the sculpture was already on the island in 1558. The image is set in a silver throne of the 18th century. The walls of the church are covered by frescoes and wall paintings by Mariano de Cossío (1880–1960), representing religious themes and the victory at the Battle of Lepanto.

Since 1986, the church and the former convent have been listed as buildings of cultural interest on the Canary Islands.
