= San Cristóbal de La Laguna =

- Municipality and city
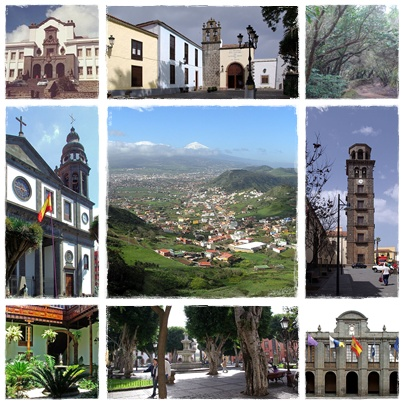
- Clockwise from top: University of La Laguna, Shrine of Cristo de La Laguna, Forests, Cathedral of La Laguna, Panoramic city, Iglesia de la Concepción, Consejo Consultivo de Canarias, Plaza del Adelantado and city council.

- Flag Coat of arms
- Nicknames: "La Ciudad de los Adelantados", "La Ciudad de Aguere".
- Location of San Cristóbal de La Laguna
- Location within Tenerife Location within Canary Islands Location within Spain, Canary Islands
- Coordinates: 28°29′07″N 16°19′00″W
- Country: Spain
- Autonomous community: Canary Islands
- Province: Santa Cruz de Tenerife

Government
  - Mayor: Luis Yeray Gutiérrez (PSOE)

Area
  - Total: 102.6 km^{2} (39.6 sq mi)
- Elevation: 543 m (1,781 ft)

Population (2025-01-01)
  - Total: 161,108
  - Density: 1,570/km^{2} (4,067/sq mi)
- Time zone: UTC0 (WET)
  - Summer (DST): UTC+1 (WEST)
- Postal code: 38200
- Official language(s): Spanish
- Website: Official website

UNESCO World Heritage Site
- Criteria: Cultural: (ii), (iv)
- Reference: 929
- Inscription: 1999 (23rd Session)
- Area: 60.38 ha (149.2 acres)
- Buffer zone: 23.71 ha (58.6 acres)

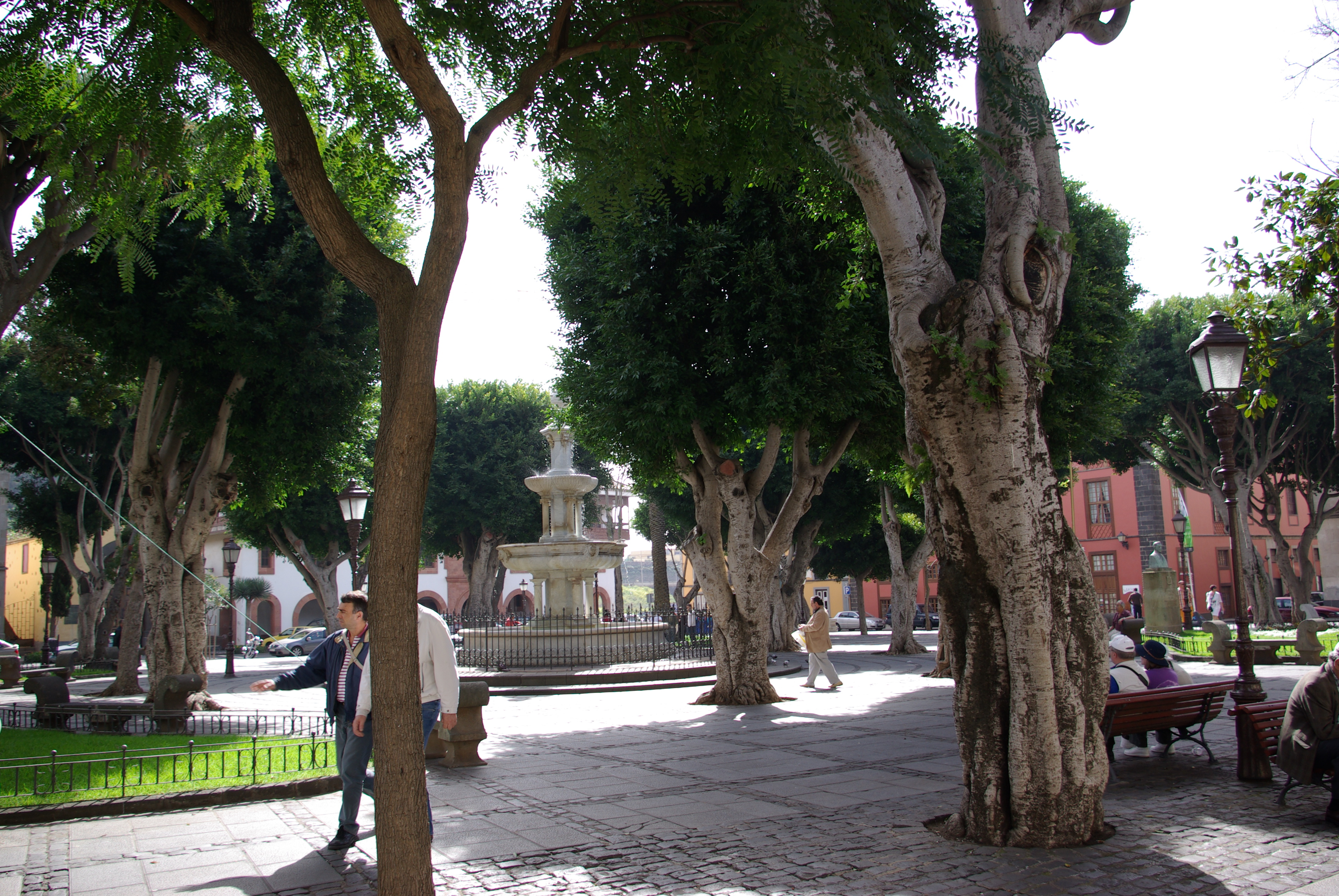
Plaza del Adelantado. La Laguna

San Cristóbal de La Laguna (commonly known as La Laguna, Spanish pronunciation: [saŋ kɾisˈtoβal de la laˈɣuna]) is a city and municipality in the northern part of the island of Tenerife in the Province of Santa Cruz de Tenerife, on the Canary Islands, Spain. The former capital of the Canary Islands, the city is the third-most populous city of the archipelago and the second-most populous city of the island.

In 1999 the historical center of La Laguna was declared a World Heritage Site by UNESCO, after being nominated by Spain. La Laguna is situated alongside the city of Santa Cruz de Tenerife; thus, the two cities and municipalities form a single large urban center. Its economy is business-oriented while agriculture dominates the northeastern portion of the city. The urban area dominates the central and the southern parts.

La Laguna is considered to be the cultural capital of the Canary Islands. It holds the incorrupt body of Sor María de Jesús, and the Christ of La Laguna (Cristo de La Laguna).

A landmark of the city is the Cathedral of La Laguna, which is the Catholic cathedral of Tenerife and its diocese (Diocese of Tenerife). Important historical figures of the city include Amaro Pargo, one of the famous corsairs of the Golden Age of Piracy, and José de Anchieta, Catholic saint, missionary, and founder of the cities of São Paulo and Rio de Janeiro in Brazil. The 16th- century young woman, Catalina Lercaro, was said to have committed suicide rather than accept an arranged marriage she opposed. Her spectre or ghost is said to haunt her former family mansion, now used as a museum of history of Tenerife.

== Etymology ==
Alonso Fernández de Lugo named the city as "Villa de San Cristóbal de La Gran Laguna" upon its founding, believed to be related to a nearby pond or lake (laguna). The name was later shortened to "San Cristóbal de La Laguna".

== Coat of arms ==
Queen Joanna of Castile granted the coat of arms on 23 March 1510, designated for the island of Tenerife. Officials of the town of La Laguna, designated as the capital after the conquest, adopted this emblem as their own.

It features an island with a volcano spitting fire, on waves, between a castle and a lion. Above is the archangel Saint Michael, holding a spear in one hand and a shield in the other. In the border, the inscription Michael Arcangele Veni in Adjutorium Populo Dei Thenerife Me Fecit. These elements symbolize the incorporation of the island of Tenerife to the Crown of Castile and its evangelization under the patronage of Saint Michael.

== Subdivisions ==
- La Verdellada
- Viña Nava
- El Coromoto
- San Benito
- El Bronco
- La Cuesta
- Taco
- Tejina
- Valle Guerra
- Bajamar
- Punta del Hidalgo
- Geneto
- Los Baldios
- Guamasa
- El Ortigal
- Las Mercedes
- El Batan
- Las Carboneras
- San Diego
- Las Gavias

== Climate ==
Because it captures moisture from the prevailing northeasterly winds, San Cristóbal de La Laguna has a Mediterranean climate (Köppen: Csb) that contrasts with the arid climate of other cities on the Canary Islands. It receives three to five times more rainfall than falls on the southern slopes, around ten percent less sunshine, and about ten percent higher humidity throughout the year. In spite of its elevation, the maritime and subtropical influences keep the temperature above frost at all times.

Climate data for La Laguna (1991–2020) – Tenerife North Airport (altitude: 632 metres or 2,073 feet), extremes since 1944
Month	Jan	Feb	Mar	Apr	May	Jun	Jul	Aug	Sep	Oct	Nov	Dec	Year
Record high °C (°F)	25.9 (78.6)	26.9 (80.4)	30.6 (87.1)	33.0 (91.4)	37.6 (99.7)	37.9 (100.2)	41.4 (106.5)	41.2 (106.2)	38.0 (100.4)	35.0 (95.0)	33.0 (91.4)	25.2 (77.4)	41.4 (106.5)
Mean maximum °C (°F)	21.1 (70.0)	21.2 (70.2)	24.7 (76.5)	25.0 (77.0)	27.9 (82.2)	30.2 (86.4)	33.8 (92.8)	33.8 (92.8)	30.5 (86.9)	28.9 (84.0)	25.5 (77.9)	21.5 (70.7)	36.4 (97.5)
Mean daily maximum °C (°F)	16.3 (61.3)	16.8 (62.2)	18.0 (64.4)	18.7 (65.7)	20.5 (68.9)	22.3 (72.1)	24.4 (75.9)	25.9 (78.6)	24.7 (76.5)	22.8 (73.0)	19.6 (67.3)	17.4 (63.3)	20.6 (69.1)
Daily mean °C (°F)	13.3 (55.9)	13.5 (56.3)	14.3 (57.7)	14.9 (58.8)	16.5 (61.7)	18.3 (64.9)	20.2 (68.4)	21.5 (70.7)	20.6 (69.1)	19.2 (66.6)	16.5 (61.7)	14.5 (58.1)	17.0 (62.6)
Mean daily minimum °C (°F)	10.3 (50.5)	10.1 (50.2)	10.6 (51.1)	11.2 (52.2)	12.4 (54.3)	14.2 (57.6)	16.0 (60.8)	17.0 (62.6)	16.6 (61.9)	15.5 (59.9)	13.5 (56.3)	11.6 (52.9)	13.3 (55.9)
Mean minimum °C (°F)	7.5 (45.5)	7.6 (45.7)	7.8 (46.0)	8.9 (48.0)	9.8 (49.6)	11.9 (53.4)	13.7 (56.7)	14.9 (58.8)	14.4 (57.9)	12.3 (54.1)	9.9 (49.8)	9.1 (48.4)	6.7 (44.1)
Record low °C (°F)	3.2 (37.8)	3.4 (38.1)	2.0 (35.6)	5.2 (41.4)	6.6 (43.9)	8.8 (47.8)	10.0 (50.0)	7.0 (44.6)	10.0 (50.0)	9.4 (48.9)	7.8 (46.0)	5.7 (42.3)	2.0 (35.6)
Average rainfall mm (inches)	72.2 (2.84)	65.5 (2.58)	67.9 (2.67)	37.5 (1.48)	17.5 (0.69)	9.9 (0.39)	7.3 (0.29)	6.5 (0.26)	12.7 (0.50)	55.8 (2.20)	90.3 (3.56)	76.9 (3.03)	520 (20.49)
Average rainy days (≥ 1.0 mm)	7.7	7.2	7.3	6.2	3.7	2.7	2.1	1.1	2.5	7.3	8.9	8.3	65
Mean monthly sunshine hours	145	159	188	197	222	215	257	272	223	190	140	125	2,333
Source 1: Météo Climat
Source 2: Infoclimat

Climate data for La Laguna (1981–2010) – Tenerife North Airport (altitude: 632 metres or 2,073 feet)
Month	Jan	Feb	Mar	Apr	May	Jun	Jul	Aug	Sep	Oct	Nov	Dec	Year
Record high °C (°F)	25.8 (78.4)	26.9 (80.4)	30.6 (87.1)	33.0 (91.4)	37.6 (99.7)	37.9 (100.2)	41.4 (106.5)	41.2 (106.2)	38.0 (100.4)	33.2 (91.8)	31.0 (87.8)	25.2 (77.4)	41.4 (106.5)
Mean daily maximum °C (°F)	16.0 (60.8)	16.7 (62.1)	18.2 (64.8)	18.5 (65.3)	20.1 (68.2)	22.2 (72.0)	24.7 (76.5)	25.7 (78.3)	24.9 (76.8)	22.5 (72.5)	19.7 (67.5)	17.1 (62.8)	20.5 (68.9)
Daily mean °C (°F)	13.1 (55.6)	13.4 (56.1)	14.5 (58.1)	14.7 (58.5)	16.1 (61.0)	18.1 (64.6)	20.2 (68.4)	21.2 (70.2)	20.7 (69.3)	18.9 (66.0)	16.5 (61.7)	14.3 (57.7)	16.8 (62.2)
Mean daily minimum °C (°F)	10.2 (50.4)	10.0 (50.0)	10.7 (51.3)	10.9 (51.6)	12.0 (53.6)	14.0 (57.2)	15.7 (60.3)	16.6 (61.9)	16.5 (61.7)	15.2 (59.4)	13.3 (55.9)	11.5 (52.7)	13.0 (55.4)
Record low °C (°F)	3.2 (37.8)	3.4 (38.1)	2.0 (35.6)	5.2 (41.4)	6.6 (43.9)	8.8 (47.8)	10.0 (50.0)	7.0 (44.6)	10.0 (50.0)	9.4 (48.9)	7.8 (46.0)	5.7 (42.3)	2.0 (35.6)
Average rainfall mm (inches)	80 (3.1)	70 (2.8)	61 (2.4)	39 (1.5)	19 (0.7)	11 (0.4)	6 (0.2)	5 (0.2)	16 (0.6)	47 (1.9)	81 (3.2)	82 (3.2)	517 (20.2)
Average rainy days (≥ 1.0 mm)	11	10	10	10	7	4	3	3	5	10	10	12	95
Average relative humidity (%)	76	75	71	74	72	73	69	69	71	74	75	79	73
Mean monthly sunshine hours	150	168	188	203	234	237	262	269	213	194	155	137	2,410
Source: Agencia Estatal de Meteorología

== History ==
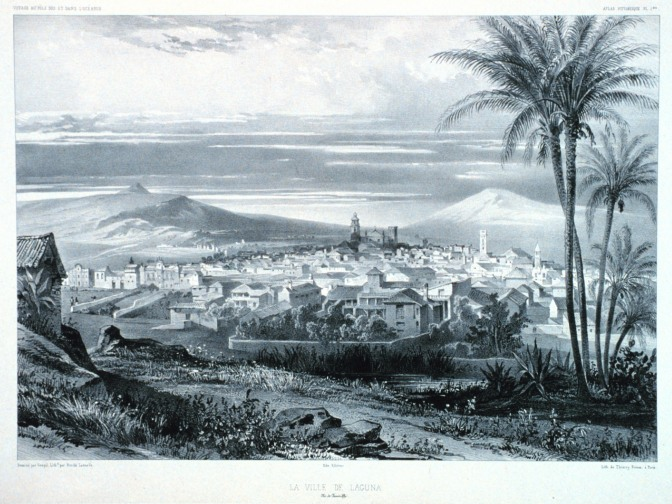
San Cristóbal de La Laguna in 1880

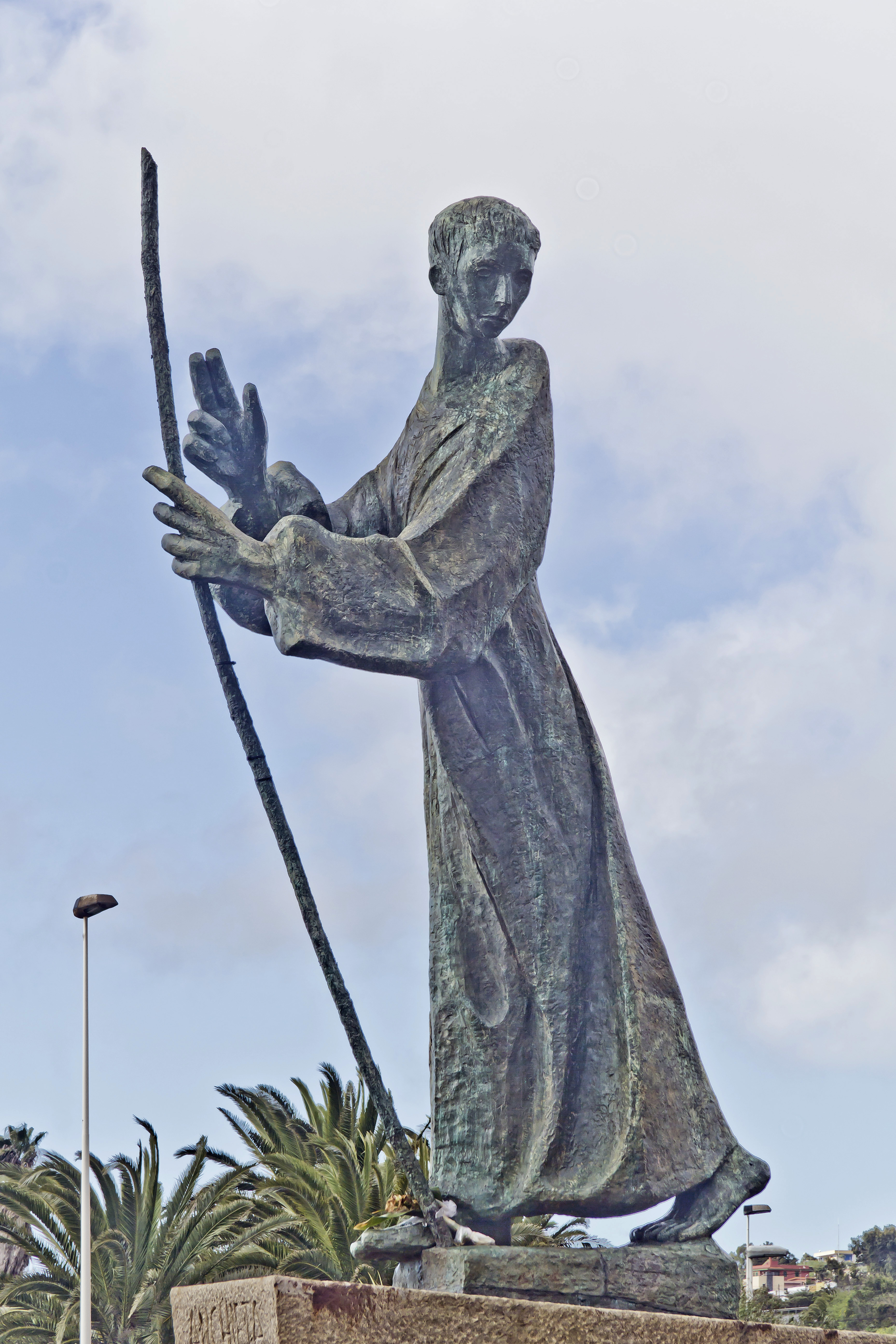
Statue of Saint José de Anchieta, saint and evangelizing missionary of Brazil.

The land upon which the city now stands belonged to the Menceyato de Anaga, which was one of nine aboriginal Guanche kingdoms on the island until its conquest by the Kingdom of Castile. The valley of Aguere (where the city lies) and especially the large lake that was in this place, was a place of pilgrimage for the aborigines of the island.

The Battle of Aguere was fought in the city in 1494. The city was founded between 1496 and 1497 by Alonso Fernández de Lugo and became the capital of the island of Tenerife after the conclusion of the conquest of the islands. Later the city became the capital of all of the Canary Islands. In 1582, the city suffered an epidemic of plague that resulted in between 5,000 and 9,000 deaths.

The layout of the city resembles that of many Spanish colonial cities in the Americas. Since the urban plan of the city of La Laguna was the model for these Latin American cities. The University of La Laguna was founded in 1701.

A declining population and economy in the 18th century resulted in the transfer of the capital to Santa Cruz de Tenerife in 1723. Santa Cruz has since been the capital of the island of Tenerife and the sole capital of the Canary Islands until 1927, since which time the capital of the Canary Islands has been shared with the city of Las Palmas de Gran Canaria.

The Tenerife North Airport at Los Rodeos was opened in the 1930s and is today expanding.

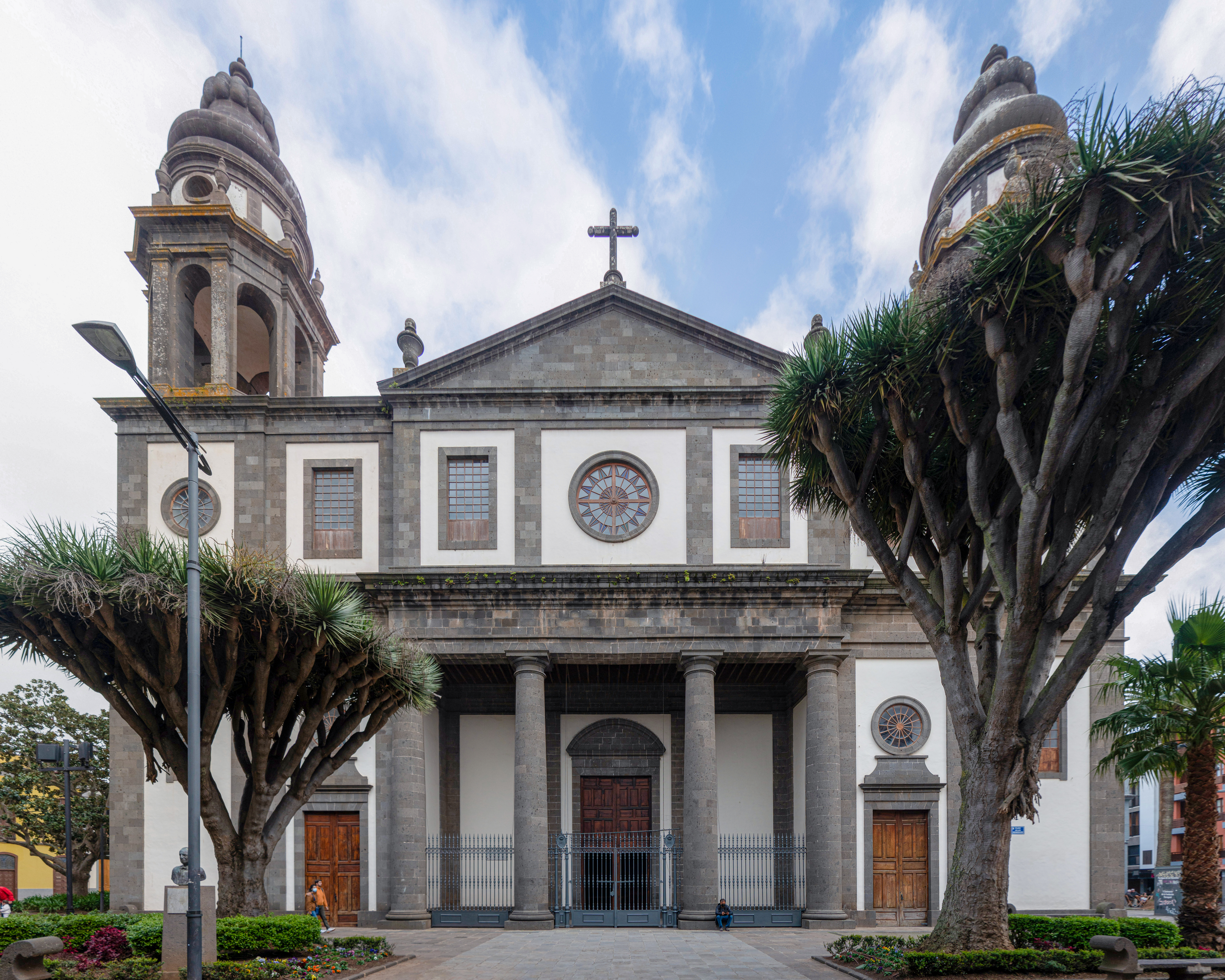
Cathedral of Our Lady of the Remedies, seat of the local Catholic diocese

The historic center of the city was declared a World Heritage Site on 2 December 1999. Several streets of historical significance have been closed off to automobile traffic. La Laguna has often been called the «Florence of the Canary Islands», due to its many churches and convents, as well as its old town and historic buildings. Also due to the fact that the city was the cradle or seat of different artistic and cultural movements then exported to the rest of the Canary archipelago, especially in the religious sphere as in Holy Week, or having been the cradle in the Canaries of the movement of the Enlightenment, also called the «Century of Lights». This favored the emergence especially in the Baroque period (XVII-XVIII centuries) of notable sculptors, painters and architects who exercised their trade in the city and sometimes exported their works to the rest of the archipelago.

Several tunnels, passages and underground vaults dating from the immediate aftermath of the founding of the city have recently been found. These tunnels are located beneath some iconic buildings such as the Iglesia de la Concepción, the Cathedral of our Lady of the Remedies and the former Convent of San Agustín. Researchers believe that the present city of La Laguna has been raised, because now it does not have the same ground level as at the time of its founding. In some places it is more than one meter higher and buries what is underneath.

== Main sights ==
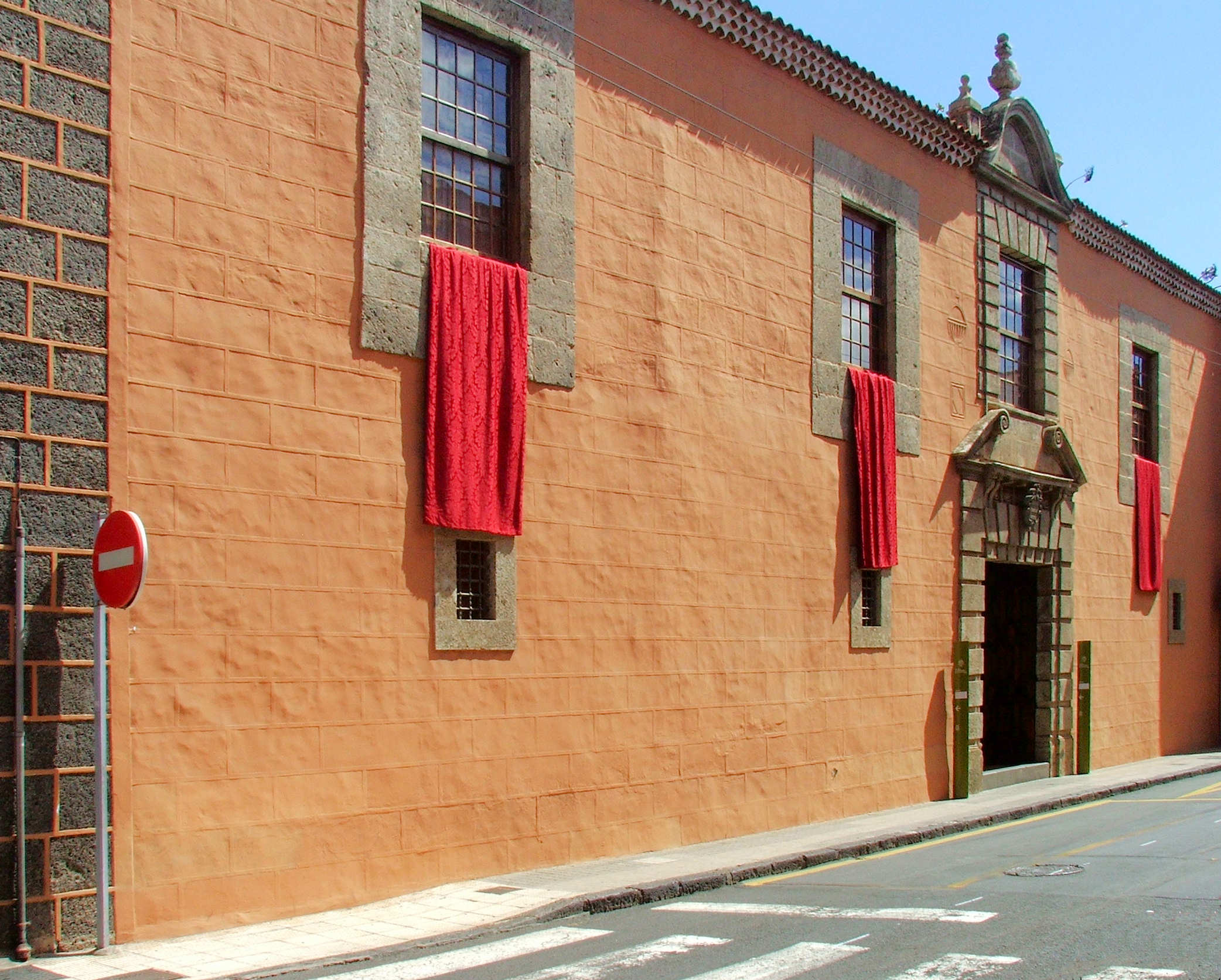
Museum of the History of Tenerife (Palacio Lercaro)

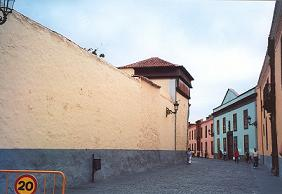
Calle de La Carrera

- Cathedral of La Laguna: with a neoclassical façade (1819).
- Iglesia de la Concepción: It was the first parish to be built on the island of Tenerife.
- Old City: It is listed as a World Heritage Site by UNESCO, because the layout of its streets has served as a model for the construction of some of the main Latin American capitals. There are many colonial-style buildings there, with their wooden balconies and magnificent tree-lined courtyards that occupy the center of the building. We can also visit several, richly planted with trees and flowers.
- Real Santuario del Santísimo Cristo de La Laguna: It is one of the most important temples in the city and on the island, as inside is the venerated image of Christ, very popular in the archipelago.
- University of La Laguna: The first university founded in the Canary Islands.
- Casa Anchieta: It is the birthplace of Saint José de Anchieta, considered by the Catholic Church as the Apostle of Brazil.
- Salazar Palace: It is the palace of the Salazar de Frías Family, currently it works as the bishop's palace of the Diocese of Tenerife. Inside the building, the Bishopric Chapel stands out, the fruit of the work of an international and ecumenical group led by the Slovenian Jesuit, Marko Ivan Rupnik with a neo-Byzantine mosaic that represents the mystery of Pentecost.
- Nava Palace: It is an example of Canarian architecture that combines Baroque, Neoclassical and Mannerist elements.
- Church of Santo Domingo de Guzmán: It is one of the oldest churches in the city, in it is the tomb of the famous corsair Amaro Pargo.
- Instituto Canarias Cabrera Pinto: The oldest secondary school in the archipelago still in use.
- Teatro Leal: Built in 1915.
- Plaza del Adelantado: The city's main square surrounded by many interesting buildings: the town hall (Casa del Corregidor), the Nava Palace, the Santa Catalina de Siena convent, the San Miguel Arcángel hermitage.
- Museum of the History of Tenerife: (Palacio Lercaro) Museum that presents the history of the island from the 15th century to the present day. The museum is also known for the alleged appearances of the ghost of Catalina Lercaro, a young woman from the 16th century who committed suicide.

== Festivals and holidays ==
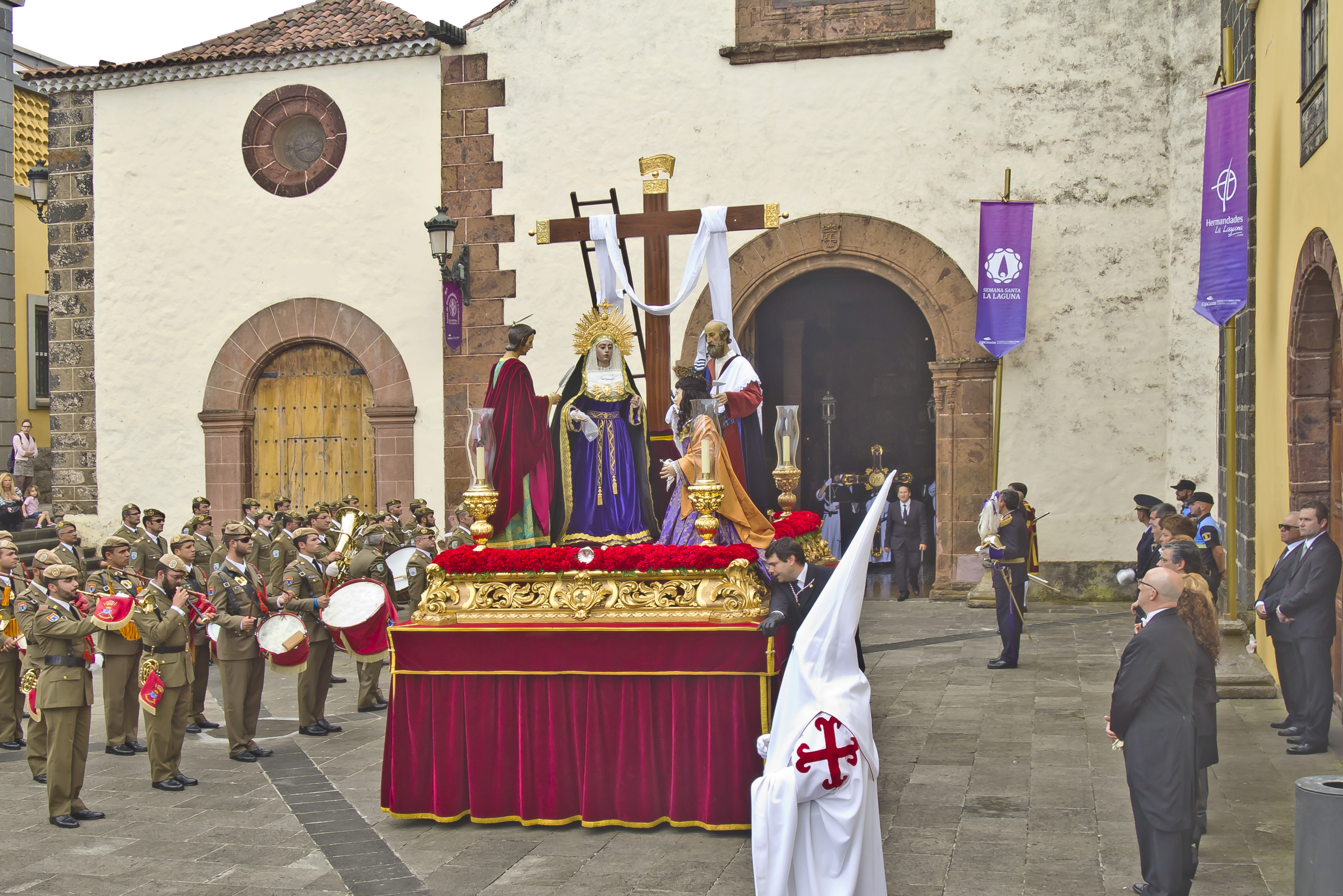
Procession of Holy Week in San Cristóbal de La Laguna

The Romería Regional de San Benito Abad is a popular romeria that is considered the most representative of the Canary Islands, which involves groups coming from all corners of the archipelago. The second Sunday of July is celebrated. She is also considered among the most important romeria in Spain. Courtship is carried through the streets in which people are dressed in traditional costumes and decorated with typical products bullock carts. Along the way throughout the city there are also Canarian folk music.

Holiday of the Cristo de La Laguna is celebrated every 14 September in honor of a much venerated image of Christ in the Canary Islands, the Cristo de La Laguna. For this event come people from all over the archipelago. It is the leading holidays in town.

Holy Week in the city of San Cristóbal de La Laguna is the largest of the Canary Islands. Holy Week has steps of great historical and artistic value, such as the aforementioned Cristo de La Laguna, accompanied by their guilds, some of them centuries old and which adopted the use of the hood in the nineteenth century, ride on the wheeled carts streets of the city.

== Sister cities ==
- Cartagena de Indias, Colombia
- São Paulo, Brazil
- Telde, Spain
- Colima, Mexico

== People ==
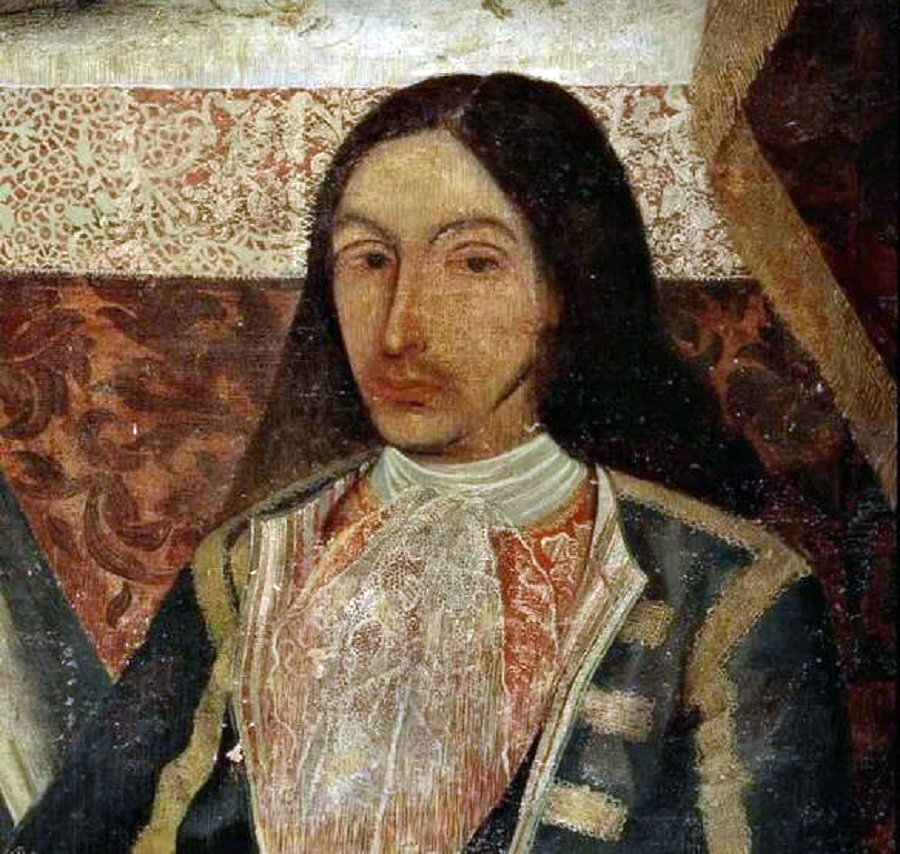
Amaro Pargo, corsair and merchant born in the city

- José de Anchieta (19 March 1534 – 9 June 1597), saint and important in the early colonial history of Brazil
- Juan Núñez de la Peña (1641–1721), a Spanish historian
- Amaro Pargo (1678–1747), Spanish corsair
- José Rodríguez de la Oliva (1695–1777): sculptor and painter of Baroque
- Cristóbal Bencomo y Rodríguez (1758–1835): priest, confessor of King Ferdinand VII of Spain and Titular Archbishop of Heraclea
- Juan Domingo de Monteverde (1773–1832), military man
- Oscar Domínguez (9 January 1906 – 31 December 1957), Spanish painter and surrealist
- Antonio Cubillo (3 June 1930 – 10 December 2012), revolutionary and politician
- Suso Santana (born 2 March 1985), footballer
- Sergio Rodriguez (born 12 June 1986), basketball player
- Cristo Reyes (born 30 July 1987), darts player
- Ana Guerra (born 1994): singer. Famous for being a contestant of the television program Operación Triunfo 2017

== See also ==
- List of municipalities in Santa Cruz de Tenerife
