= Tenerife =

Largest and most populous Canary island

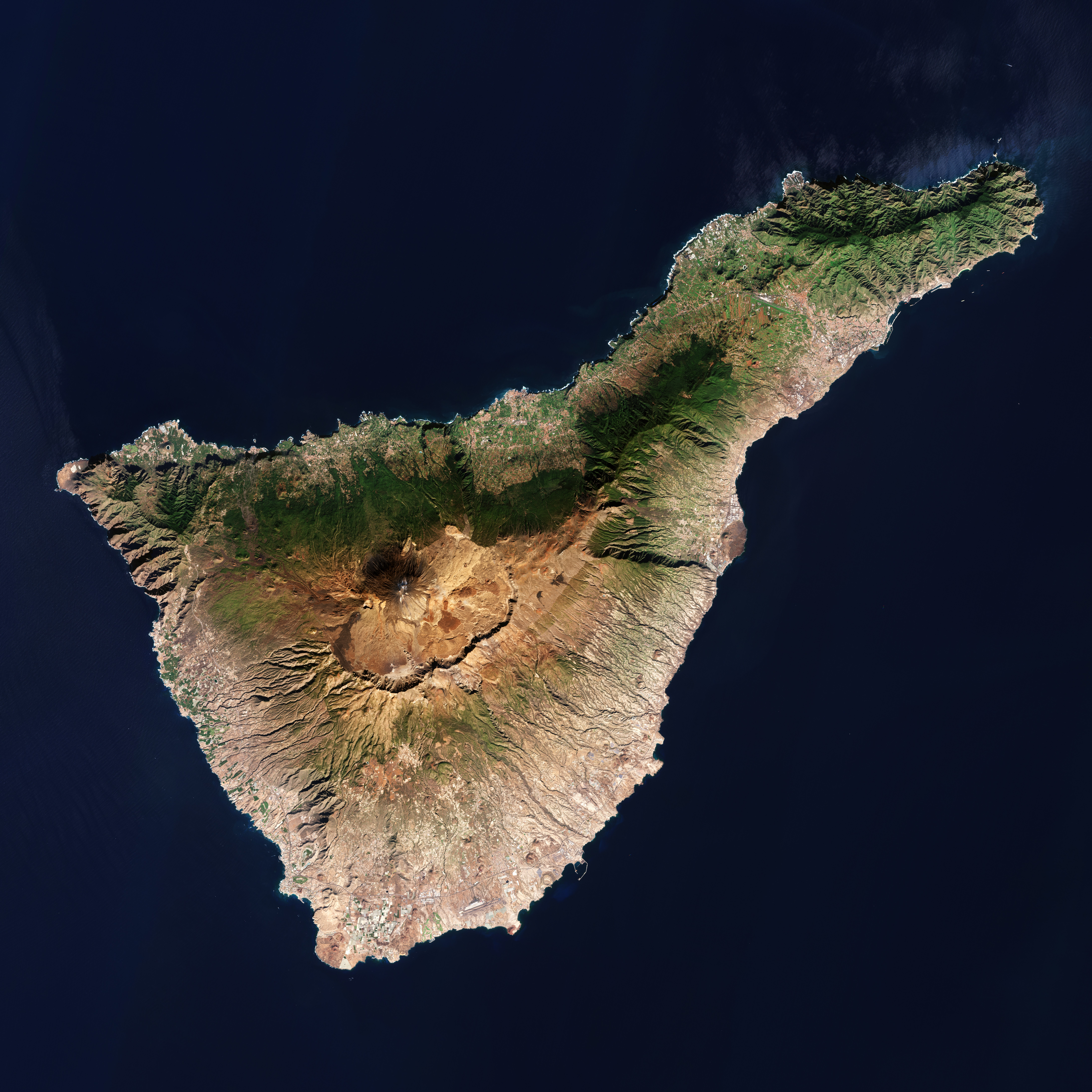
- Satellite view

- Location in the Canary Islands

Geography
- Location: Atlantic Ocean
- Coordinates: 28°16′7″N 16°36′20″W
- Archipelago: Canary Islands
- Area: 2,034.38 km^{2} (785.48 sq mi)
- Area rank: 1st
- Coastline: 342 km (212.5 mi)
- Highest elevation
- Highest point: Teide

Administration
- Spain
- Autonomous community: Canary Islands
- Province: Santa Cruz de Tenerife
- Capital and largest city: Santa Cruz de Tenerife (pop. 212,080)
- President of the cabildo insular: Rosa Dávila Mamely (2023)

Demographics
- Demonym: tinerfeño/a; chicharrero/a
- Population: 974,003 (2026)
- Population rank: 1st
- Pop. density: 478/km^{2} (1238/sq mi)
- Pop. density rank: 2nd
- Languages: Spanish
- Ethnic groups: • 74% Spaniards • 26% foreign-born

Additional information
- Time zone: WET (UTC±00:00)
  - Summer (DST): WEST (UTC+01:00)
- Official website: tenerife.es
- All rankings mentioned are in the context of the Canary Islands only.

Tenerife (/ˌtɛnəˈriːf(eɪ)/ TEN-ə-REEF-(ay); Spanish: [teneˈɾife]; formerly spelled Teneriffe) is the largest and most-populous island of the Canary Islands, an autonomous community of Spain, located in the Atlantic Ocean off the northwestern coast of Africa. With an area of 2,034.38 km^{2} (785.48 sq mi) and a population of 972,018 in 2026, it is the largest island in Macaronesia, and the most populous island in both Macaronesia and Spain. Tenerife is dominated by Teide, a volcanic peak that is the highest mountain in Spain and the highest point in the Atlantic islands.

The island was inhabited by the Indigenous Guanche people before its incorporation into the Crown of Castile in 1496. Today, Tenerife is the political, economic, and demographic centre of the Canary Islands. Its capital, Santa Cruz de Tenerife, shares the status of capital of the autonomous community with Las Palmas de Gran Canaria, while nearby San Cristóbal de La Laguna is home to the University of La Laguna and one of the two sites declared a World Heritage Site by UNESCO on the island.

Tenerife is known for its diverse landscapes, which range from volcanic peaks and pine forests to coastal cliffs and subtropical valleys. The island contains Teide National Park, a UNESCO World Heritage Site, and the Macizo de Anaga, a UNESCO Biosphere Reserve. Owing to its varied environments and long geographic isolation, Tenerife supports a large number of endemic plant and animal species.

Tourism is a major component of the island's economy, and Tenerife is one of Spain's most visited destinations. It is also known for the Carnival of Santa Cruz de Tenerife, one of the largest carnival celebrations in the world.

== Name and etymology ==
=== Toponymy ===
The island known today as Tenerife was called Achinet or Chenet by the Indigenous Guanche people. In antiquity, the Romans referred to the island as Nivaria, from the Latin nix ("snow"), a reference to the snow-covered summit of Teide.

The modern name Tenerife is generally believed to derive from an Indigenous Canarian term of Berber (Tamazight) origin, although its exact meaning remains disputed. One widely cited interpretation derives the name from teni ("mountain") and ife ("white"), meaning "white mountain", in reference to Teide. Other explanations have been proposed, including a tradition recorded by seventeenth-century historians that connected the name to the Guanche ruler Tinerfe, who was said to have lived before the Castilian conquest of the Canary Islands.

=== Demonym ===
The formal demonym for the people of Tenerife is Tinerfeño (masculine) or Tinerfeña (feminine). Another commonly used term is chicharrero or chicharrera, which is now most often associated with the inhabitants of Santa Cruz de Tenerife.

Chicharrero originated as a derogatory nickname used by residents of San Cristóbal de La Laguna for the fishermen and poorer residents of Santa Cruz. The term referred to the consumption of mackerel (chicharro) and potatoes, foods regarded as humble by the elite of La Laguna. After Santa Cruz became the island's capital in 1833, its inhabitants gradually adopted the former insult as a positive marker of local identity.

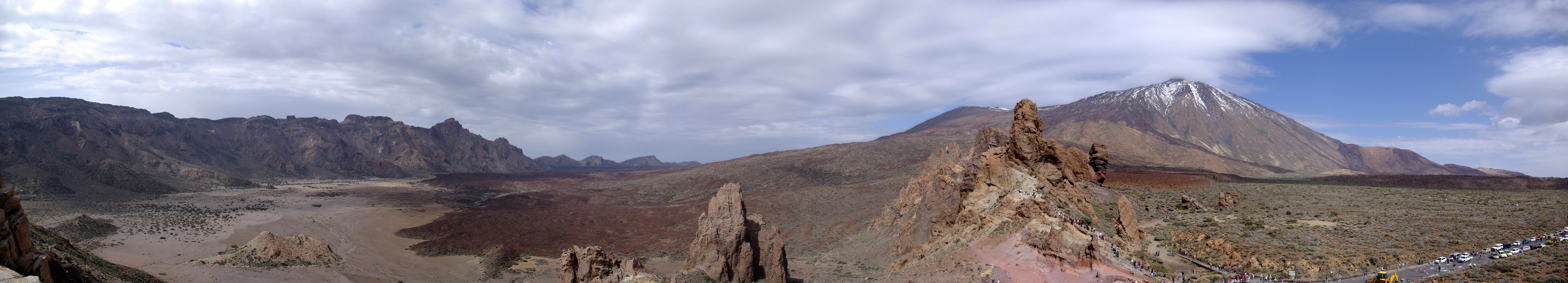
Panorama of Teide National Park

== Prehistory ==
The earliest known human settlement on Tenerife dates to at least the sixth century BCE, based on archaeological evidence from the Cave of the Guanches near Icod de los Vinos in northern Tenerife. Archaeological sites distributed across Tenerife provide important insights into Guanche life before European contact. The Cave of the Guanches has yielded some of the oldest human remains found in the Canary Islands. Nearby sites, including the Caves of Don Gaspar, have produced carbonized seeds and other botanical remains that indicate the cultivation of crops. Other discoveries include pottery, basketry, stone tools, bone implements, and the remains of domesticated animals.

Guanche subsistence was based mainly on herding, especially goats and sheep. Agriculture, fishing, shellfish gathering, and the collection of wild plants also formed part of daily life.

=== Territorial organisation ===
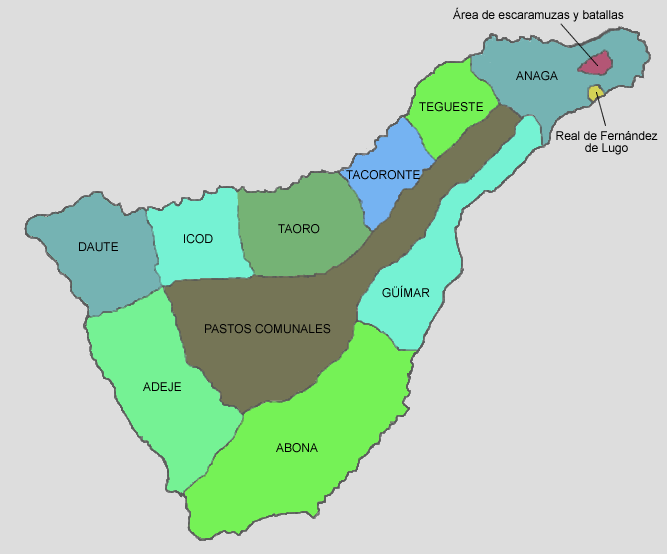
Territorial divisions of Tenerife before the Castilian conquest

By the time of European contact in the fifteenth century CE, Tenerife was divided into several territorial polities known as menceyatos each ruled by a leader called a mencey.

According to traditional accounts, the Guanche ruler Tinerfe "the Great" governed the island from Adeje in southwestern Tenerife. Following his death, the island was divided among his descendants, eventually forming the nine menceyatos.

These territories were the main political divisions of Guanche society at the time of European contact. Their boundaries broadly corresponded to different regions of the island. The most powerful was Taoro, which played a leading role in resistance to the Castilian conquest.

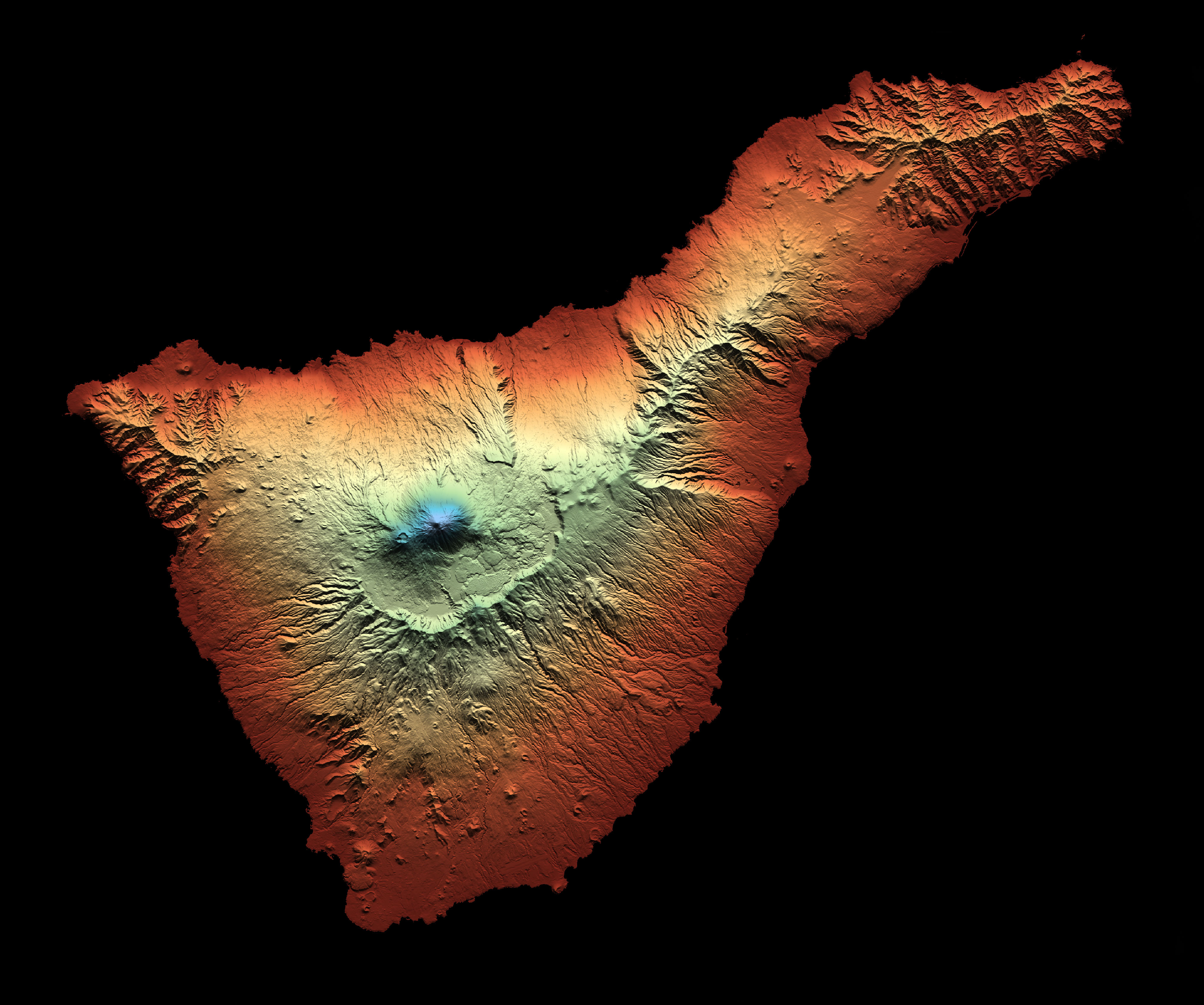
Altitude map of Tenerife, with the highest altitude (Mount Teide) in blue and the lowest (sea level) in black

The nine menceyatos and their approximate modern territories are shown below.

Menceyatos of Tenerife before the Castilian conquest
Menceyato	Approximate modern area
Abona	Arico, Arona, Fasnia, Granadilla de Abona, and San Miguel de Abona
Adeje	Adeje, Guía de Isora, and Vilaflor
Anaga	Santa Cruz de Tenerife and part of San Cristóbal de La Laguna
Daute	Buenavista del Norte, El Tanque, Los Silos, and Santiago del Teide
Güímar	Arafo, Candelaria, El Rosario, and Güímar
Icode	Garachico, Icod de los Vinos, La Guancha, and San Juan de la Rambla
Tacoronte	El Sauzal and Tacoronte
Taoro	La Matanza de Acentejo, La Orotava, La Victoria de Acentejo, Los Realejos, Puerto de la Cruz, and Santa Úrsula
Tegueste	Tegueste and part of San Cristóbal de La Laguna

=== Archaeological sites ===
Archaeological sites associated with the Guanche people, who inhabited Tenerife before the Castilian conquest of 1494–1496, are found throughout the island, particularly in caves and rock shelters. Cave paintings occur across Tenerife, although most are concentrated in the south.

Among the most important archaeological sites are the Cave of the Guanches and the Caves of Don Gaspar, both located in Icod de los Vinos in northwestern Tenerife. The Cave of the Guanches contains the oldest human remains discovered in the Canary Islands, dating to the 6th century BCE. Plant remains recovered from the Caves of Don Gaspar, including carbonized seeds, indicate that the Guanches practised agriculture on Tenerife.

Ritual and religious sites include the Estación solar de Masca (Masca Solar Station) in Buenavista del Norte, an Indigenous sanctuary associated with fertility rites and ceremonies intended to bring rainfall. The Cueva de Achbinico in Candelaria was an Indigenous sacred site that later became the first Marian shrine in the Canary Islands following the Castilian conquest.

Other archaeological sites include Los Cambados and El Barranco del Rey, both located in Arona. The origins of the Güímar Pyramids, located in Güímar, remain uncertain.

Some archaeological evidence has been interpreted as indicating Punic presence on Tenerife. The most notable example is the Stone of the Guanches in Taganana, in the Anaga Mountains of northeastern Tenerife, a large stone block bearing rock carvings. Among these is a bottle-shaped symbol surrounded by cruciform motifs that has been interpreted as a representation of the Carthaginian goddess Tanit. The monument has been variously interpreted as a sacrificial altar associated with Semitic religious traditions and as a site later reused by the Guanches in connection with mummification rituals.

== History ==
=== Colonial era ===
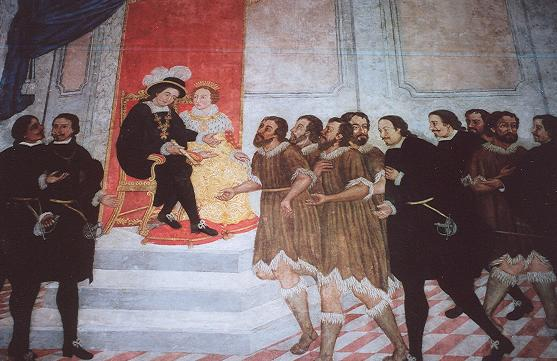
Alonso Fernández de Lugo presenting the native rulers of Tenerife to Isabella I of Castile and Ferdinand II of Aragon

Tenerife was the last of the Canary Islands to be incorporated into the Crown of Castile and the one that took the longest to conquer. Castilian efforts to gain control of the island began in 1464, when Diego García de Herrera, Lord of the Canary Islands, claimed Tenerife for the Crown and reached agreements with several Guanche leaders, although relations later broke down.

In December 1493, the Catholic Monarchs, Isabella I of Castile and Ferdinand II of Aragon, granted Alonso Fernández de Lugo the right to conquer the island. He landed in 1494 and fought a campaign against the Guanche kingdoms that included a Guanche victory at the First Battle of Acentejo and a Castilian victory at the Second Battle of Acentejo. The conquest ended in 1496 when the remaining Guanche rulers accepted Castilian rule.

Following the conquest, Tenerife became part of the Spanish Empire. Many Guanches died from diseases brought by Europeans, while others intermarried with settlers from Spain and other parts of the empire, including Flanders, Italy, and Germany. During the 16th century, forests were cleared to provide fuel and farmland, and agriculture became increasingly focused on export crops including sugar cane, wine grapes, cochineal, and plantains.

Between the 16th and 18th centuries, Tenerife faced repeated attacks by English raiders and privateers, including John Hawkins, Walter Raleigh, Robert Blake, and Woodes Rogers.

During the 17th and 18th centuries, Santa Cruz de Tenerife developed into an important centre for corsair activity in Macaronesia. Historical records indicate that many of these expeditions were organized by island residents. Pirate ships also used landing places along Tenerife's coast, and San Andrés gained a reputation as a "pirate port" before the construction of its defensive tower.

The most notable attack took place in 1797, when a British force led by Admiral Horatio Nelson attempted to capture Santa Cruz de Tenerife during the British invasion of Tenerife. Spanish troops under General Antonio Gutiérrez de Otero y Santayana successfully defended the town. Nelson was seriously wounded during the fighting and later had most of his right arm amputated. A second British landing attempt near Puerto Santiago later that year was also defeated by local defenders.

=== Trade with the Americas ===
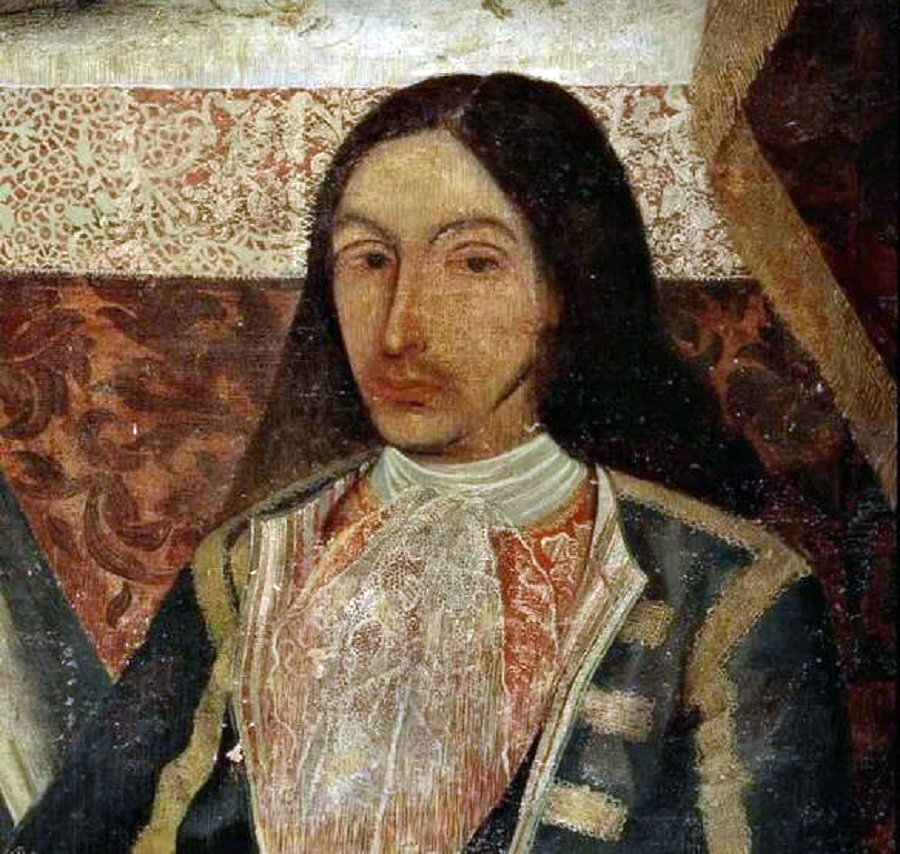
Amaro Pargo (1678–1741), corsair and merchant from Tenerife who participated in the Spanish treasure fleet (the Spanish-American trade route)

In the commerce of the Canary Islands with the Americas in the 18th century, Tenerife was the hegemonic island, since it accounted for over 50% of the number of ships and 60% of the tonnage. In the islands of La Palma and Gran Canaria, the percentage was around 19% for the first and 7% for the second. The volume of traffic between the Indies and the Canary Islands was unknown, but was very important and concentrated almost exclusively in Tenerife.

Among the products that are exported were cochineal, rum, and sugar cane, which were landed mainly in the ports of the Americas such as La Guaira, Havana, Campeche, and Veracruz. Many sailors from Tenerife joined this transcontinental maritime trade, among whom were the corsair Amaro Rodríguez Felipe, more commonly known as Amaro Pargo, Juan Pedro Dujardín, and Bernardo de Espinosa, both companions of Amaro Pargo, among others.

=== Emigration to the Americas ===
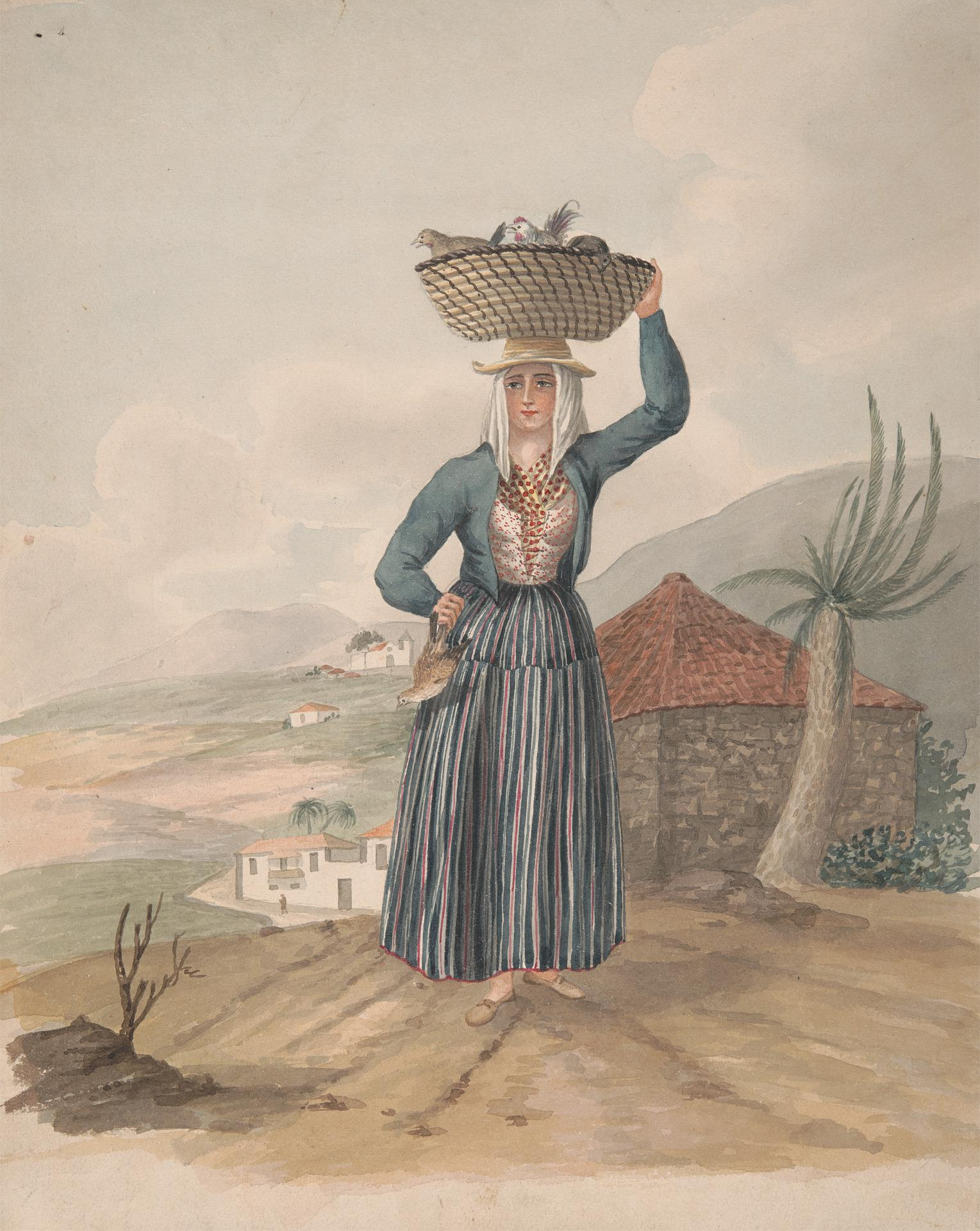
Woman of La Victoria, Tenerife, by Alfred Diston, 1828

Tenerife has long maintained close ties with Latin America through migration and trade. From the early period of Spanish colonization, many tinerfeños travelled to the Americas as crew members, settlers, and migrants seeking new opportunities.

Economic difficulties from the late 17th century contributed to significant emigration from Tenerife, particularly to Venezuela and Cuba. In 1684, Canary Islanders founded San Carlos de Tenerife on Santo Domingo. During the 18th century, the Spanish Crown encouraged further Canarian settlement in several parts of the Americas, and settlers from Tenerife participated in communities in Puerto Rico, Montevideo, San Antonio, Louisiana, and Florida.

Migration to the Americas, especially to Cuba and Venezuela, remained an important feature of Tenerife's history throughout the 19th and early 20th centuries. Since the late 20th century, economic growth driven largely by tourism has reduced emigration and attracted new residents, including descendants of earlier emigrants returning to the island.

=== Modern history ===
From 1833 to 1927, Santa Cruz de Tenerife was the sole capital of the Canary Islands. In 1927, the capital began to be shared with Las Palmas de Gran Canaria, an arrangement that continues today.

In March 1936, Spanish military officer Francisco Franco was posted to Tenerife by the Republican government. Four months later, he took part in the military uprising that led to the Spanish Civil War, and the Canary Islands came under Nationalist control. Economic hardship after the war led many island residents to emigrate to Cuba and other parts of Latin America during the 1940s and 1950s.

Tenerife was the site of the Tenerife airport disaster on 27 March 1977, when two Boeing 747 aircraft collided at Los Rodeos Airport, killing 583 people in the deadliest accident in commercial aviation history. Three years later, in 1980, Dan-Air Flight 1008 crashed while approaching Tenerife North Airport, killing all 146 people on board.

In the early 21st century, Tenerife experienced several severe weather and environmental disasters. The Tenerife flood of 2002 caused eight deaths and extensive damage in the Santa Cruz de Tenerife metropolitan area. In 2005, Tropical Storm Delta caused widespread damage across the island, with wind speeds reaching nearly 250 km/h (155 mph) on Teide. In August 2023, a major wildfire forced the evacuation of approximately 12,000 residents in several parts of the island.

Coat of arms of Tenerife

=== Symbols ===
The coat of arms of Tenerife was granted by royal decree on 23 March 1510 by King Ferdinand II of Aragon in the name of Queen Joan I of Castile. It depicts Saint Michael, the island's patron saint, above Teide, alongside a castle and a lion. The version used by the Cabildo Insular de Tenerife differs slightly from that used by the city of San Cristóbal de La Laguna.

The flag of Tenerife was originally adopted in 1845 by the Spanish Navy at its base in the Port of Santa Cruz de Tenerife. It later came to represent the island as a whole and was officially approved by the Cabildo Insular de Tenerife and the Government of the Canary Islands on 9 May 1989.

== Geography ==
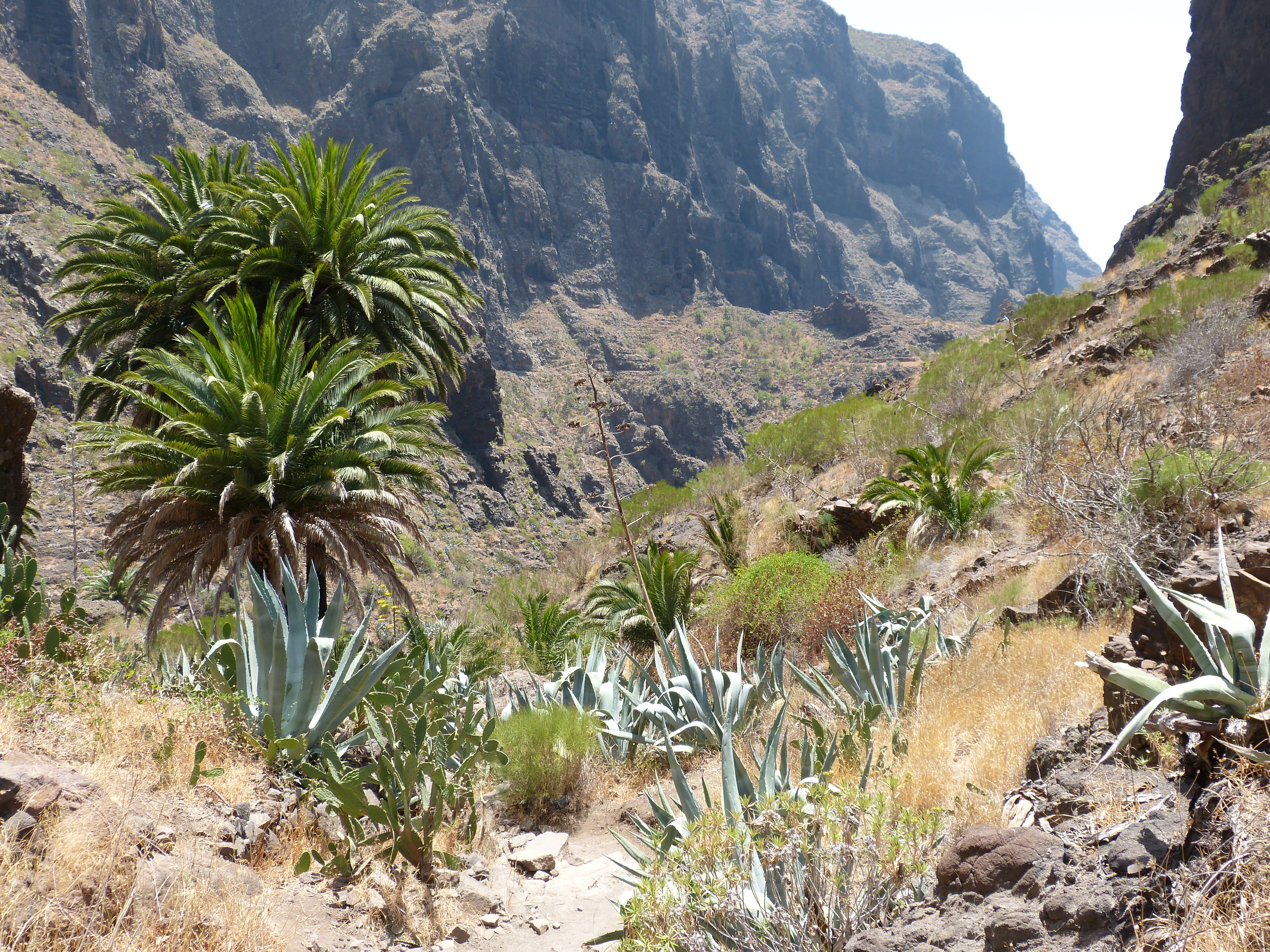
Palm tree canyon in inland Tenerife

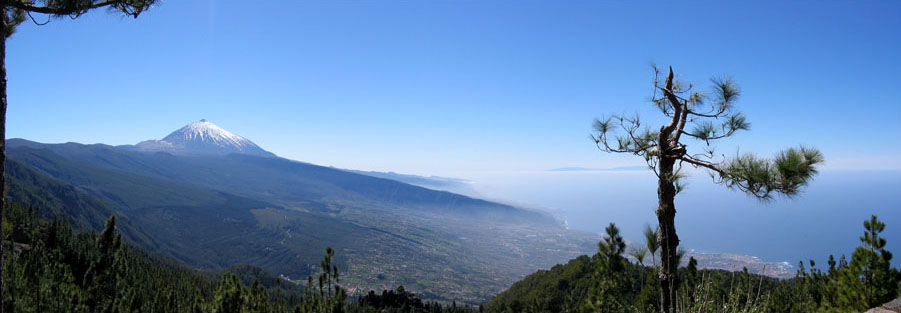
Panorama of the La Orotava Valley with Teide in the background

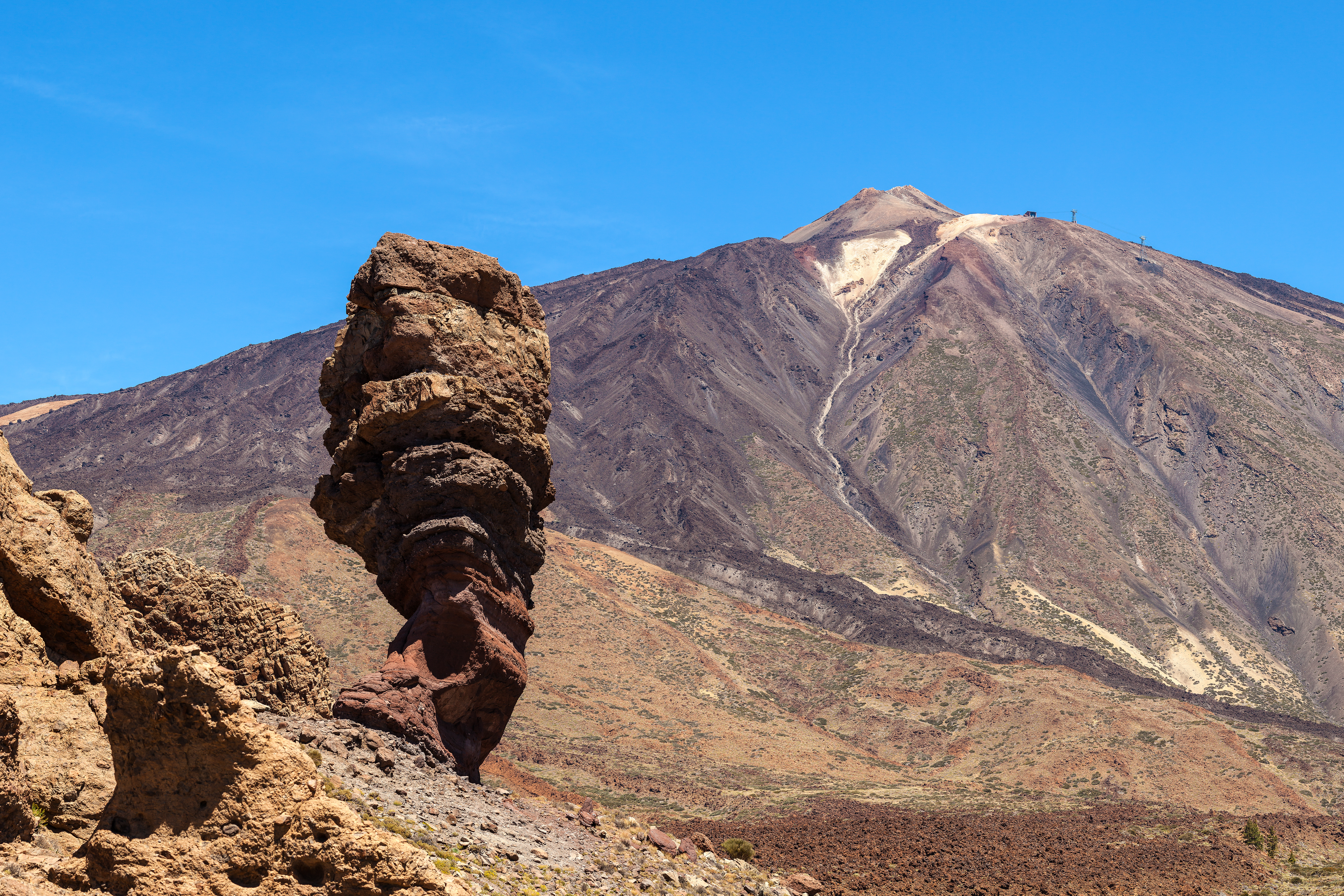
Teide and Roque Cinchado

The oldest mountain ranges in Tenerife rose from the Atlantic Ocean through volcanic eruptions, which gave birth to the island around 12 million years ago. The island as it is today was formed three million years ago by the fusion of three islands made up of the mountain ranges of Anaga, Teno and Valle de San Lorenzo, due to volcanic activity from Teide. The volcano is visible from most parts of the island today, and the crater is 17 kilometres (11 miles) long at some points. Tenerife is the largest island of the Canary Islands and the Macaronesia region.

=== Climate ===
Tenerife has a generally warm, dry climate shaped by the Atlantic Ocean, trade winds, and the island's mountainous landscape. According to the Köppen climate classification, most coastal areas have semi-arid or arid climates, while higher elevations have a subtropical Mediterranean climate.

Coastal areas typically have mild winters, with average temperatures of 18–20 °C (64–68 °F), and warm summers averaging 24–26 °C (75–79 °F). Higher areas, particularly around San Cristóbal de La Laguna, are generally cooler, wetter, and cloudier. Trade winds often create cloud cover on the north and northeast slopes, while the surrounding ocean helps keep temperatures moderate throughout the year.

The island's varied terrain creates noticeable differences in climate. Northern and northwestern Tenerife are generally wetter, while the southeast is considerably drier. During winter, it is possible to enjoy warm sunshine on the coast while snow covers the summit of Teide.

Most rainfall occurs between autumn and spring, while summers are often completely dry. Rainfall can vary considerably from year to year.

Climate data for Santa Cruz de Tenerife (1991–2020), Extremes (1920–present)
Month	Jan	Feb	Mar	Apr	May	Jun	Jul	Aug	Sep	Oct	Nov	Dec	Year
Record high °C (°F)	28.4 (83.1)	31.2 (88.2)	35.4 (95.7)	35.2 (95.4)	36.4 (97.5)	37.1 (98.8)	42.6 (108.7)	40.4 (104.7)	39.3 (102.7)	38.1 (100.6)	34.0 (93.2)	28.2 (82.8)	42.6 (108.7)
Mean daily maximum °C (°F)	21.5 (70.7)	21.6 (70.9)	22.4 (72.3)	23.3 (73.9)	24.8 (76.6)	26.9 (80.4)	29.2 (84.6)	29.7 (85.5)	28.6 (83.5)	27.0 (80.6)	24.5 (76.1)	22.6 (72.7)	25.2 (77.4)
Daily mean °C (°F)	18.5 (65.3)	18.5 (65.3)	19.2 (66.6)	20.1 (68.2)	21.5 (70.7)	23.4 (74.1)	25.4 (77.7)	26.0 (78.8)	25.3 (77.5)	23.8 (74.8)	21.6 (70.9)	19.7 (67.5)	21.9 (71.4)
Mean daily minimum °C (°F)	15.5 (59.9)	15.4 (59.7)	15.9 (60.6)	16.8 (62.2)	18.2 (64.8)	19.9 (67.8)	21.6 (70.9)	22.4 (72.3)	22.1 (71.8)	20.7 (69.3)	18.6 (65.5)	16.8 (62.2)	18.7 (65.7)
Record low °C (°F)	9.4 (48.9)	8.1 (46.6)	9.5 (49.1)	9.4 (48.9)	12.0 (53.6)	13.4 (56.1)	16.5 (61.7)	14.6 (58.3)	16.5 (61.7)	14.6 (58.3)	10.1 (50.2)	10.0 (50.0)	8.1 (46.6)
Average precipitation mm (inches)	28.8 (1.13)	32.9 (1.30)	27.9 (1.10)	10.3 (0.41)	3.5 (0.14)	0.6 (0.02)	0.1 (0.00)	3.5 (0.14)	4.5 (0.18)	24.4 (0.96)	35.8 (1.41)	36.8 (1.45)	209.1 (8.23)
Average precipitation days (≥ 1.0 mm)	4.0	3.5	3.6	2.2	0.8	0.1	0.0	0.4	0.8	3.2	5.0	4.9	28.5
Average relative humidity (%)	62.2	61.6	60.9	59.7	59.2	59.0	56.5	59.2	63.2	64.6	63.7	64.7	61.2
Mean monthly sunshine hours	187.8	191.5	235.1	253.3	289.2	312.0	346.3	329.9	267.8	227.9	179.9	177.8	2,998.5
Source 1: Agencia Estatal de Meteorología
Source 2: Agencia Estatal de Meteorología

Climate data for Tenerife South Airport (1991–2020), Extremes (1980–present)
Month	Jan	Feb	Mar	Apr	May	Jun	Jul	Aug	Sep	Oct	Nov	Dec	Year
Record high °C (°F)	29.3 (84.7)	30.0 (86.0)	34.0 (93.2)	35.6 (96.1)	37.7 (99.9)	36.2 (97.2)	42.9 (109.2)	44.3 (111.7)	41.8 (107.2)	37.0 (98.6)	35.2 (95.4)	30.0 (86.0)	44.3 (111.7)
Mean daily maximum °C (°F)	22.8 (73.0)	22.9 (73.2)	23.6 (74.5)	24.0 (75.2)	25.0 (77.0)	26.2 (79.2)	28.2 (82.8)	28.8 (83.8)	28.1 (82.6)	27.3 (81.1)	25.4 (77.7)	23.7 (74.7)	25.5 (77.9)
Daily mean °C (°F)	19.0 (66.2)	19.0 (66.2)	19.6 (67.3)	20.1 (68.2)	21.1 (70.0)	22.6 (72.7)	24.2 (75.6)	25.0 (77.0)	24.5 (76.1)	23.6 (74.5)	21.8 (71.2)	20.1 (68.2)	21.7 (71.1)
Mean daily minimum °C (°F)	15.2 (59.4)	15.0 (59.0)	15.5 (59.9)	16.2 (61.2)	17.3 (63.1)	18.9 (66.0)	20.2 (68.4)	21.1 (70.0)	20.9 (69.6)	19.9 (67.8)	18.2 (64.8)	16.5 (61.7)	17.9 (64.2)
Record low °C (°F)	9.0 (48.2)	9.8 (49.6)	9.6 (49.3)	12.2 (54.0)	13.0 (55.4)	14.6 (58.3)	16.8 (62.2)	17.1 (62.8)	16.6 (61.9)	14.8 (58.6)	12.0 (53.6)	10.4 (50.7)	9.0 (48.2)
Average precipitation mm (inches)	16.5 (0.65)	18.6 (0.73)	12.6 (0.50)	8.3 (0.33)	0.6 (0.02)	0.3 (0.01)	0.0 (0.0)	1.5 (0.06)	3.0 (0.12)	13.3 (0.52)	10.9 (0.43)	33.3 (1.31)	118.9 (4.68)
Average precipitation days (≥ 1.0 mm)	1.6	1.8	1.4	1.0	0.2	0.1	0.0	0.3	0.6	2.0	1.4	3.2	13.6
Average relative humidity (%)	59.3	60.4	61.4	62.4	62.4	63.8	62.4	63.3	65.3	64.9	61.7	61.5	62.4
Mean monthly sunshine hours	221.6	218.7	256.5	248.4	275.2	283.8	329.9	310.6	247.8	235.6	211.9	215.0	3,055
Source 1: Agencia Estatal de Meteorología
Source 2: Agencia Estatal de Meteorología

Climate data for San Cristóbal de La Laguna – Tenerife North Airport (altitude: 632 metres (2,073 feet))
Month	Jan	Feb	Mar	Apr	May	Jun	Jul	Aug	Sep	Oct	Nov	Dec	Year
Record high °C (°F)	25.6 (78.1)	26.9 (80.4)	33.2 (91.8)	33.0 (91.4)	37.6 (99.7)	37.9 (100.2)	41.4 (106.5)	41.2 (106.2)	38.0 (100.4)	33.2 (91.8)	31.0 (87.8)	25.2 (77.4)	41.4 (106.5)
Mean daily maximum °C (°F)	16.0 (60.8)	16.7 (62.1)	18.2 (64.8)	18.5 (65.3)	20.1 (68.2)	22.2 (72.0)	24.7 (76.5)	25.7 (78.3)	24.9 (76.8)	22.5 (72.5)	19.7 (67.5)	17.1 (62.8)	20.5 (68.9)
Daily mean °C (°F)	13.1 (55.6)	13.4 (56.1)	14.5 (58.1)	14.7 (58.5)	16.1 (61.0)	18.1 (64.6)	20.2 (68.4)	21.2 (70.2)	20.7 (69.3)	18.9 (66.0)	16.5 (61.7)	14.3 (57.7)	16.8 (62.2)
Mean daily minimum °C (°F)	10.2 (50.4)	10.0 (50.0)	10.7 (51.3)	10.9 (51.6)	12.0 (53.6)	14.0 (57.2)	15.7 (60.3)	16.6 (61.9)	16.5 (61.7)	15.2 (59.4)	13.3 (55.9)	11.5 (52.7)	13.0 (55.4)
Record low °C (°F)	3.2 (37.8)	3.4 (38.1)	2.0 (35.6)	4.2 (39.6)	6.0 (42.8)	8.5 (47.3)	8.5 (47.3)	7.0 (44.6)	9.2 (48.6)	6.8 (44.2)	6.2 (43.2)	3.5 (38.3)	2.0 (35.6)
Average rainfall mm (inches)	80 (3.1)	70 (2.8)	61 (2.4)	39 (1.5)	19 (0.7)	11 (0.4)	6 (0.2)	5 (0.2)	16 (0.6)	47 (1.9)	81 (3.2)	82 (3.2)	517 (20.2)
Average rainy days (≥ 1.0 mm)	11	10	10	10	7	4	3	3	5	10	10	12	95
Average relative humidity (%)	76	75	71	74	72	73	69	69	71	74	75	79	73
Mean monthly sunshine hours	150	168	188	203	234	237	262	269	213	194	155	137	2,410
Source 1: Agencia Estatal de Meteorología (1981–2010)
Source 2: Agencia Estatal de Meteorología

Climate data for Izaña Teide Observatory (altitude: 2,371 metres (7,779 feet))
Month	Jan	Feb	Mar	Apr	May	Jun	Jul	Aug	Sep	Oct	Nov	Dec	Year
Mean daily maximum °C (°F)	7.5 (45.5)	8.0 (46.4)	10.2 (50.4)	11.8 (53.2)	14.5 (58.1)	18.9 (66.0)	23.0 (73.4)	22.6 (72.7)	18.6 (65.5)	14.3 (57.7)	11.1 (52.0)	8.8 (47.8)	14.1 (57.4)
Daily mean °C (°F)	4.3 (39.7)	4.7 (40.5)	6.4 (43.5)	7.6 (45.7)	10.1 (50.2)	14.4 (57.9)	18.5 (65.3)	18.2 (64.8)	14.5 (58.1)	10.6 (51.1)	7.8 (46.0)	5.6 (42.1)	10.2 (50.4)
Mean daily minimum °C (°F)	1.1 (34.0)	1.3 (34.3)	2.7 (36.9)	3.5 (38.3)	5.8 (42.4)	9.9 (49.8)	14.0 (57.2)	13.8 (56.8)	10.4 (50.7)	6.9 (44.4)	4.5 (40.1)	2.4 (36.3)	6.4 (43.4)
Average rainfall mm (inches)	47 (1.9)	67 (2.6)	58 (2.3)	18 (0.7)	7 (0.3)	0 (0)	0 (0)	5 (0.2)	13 (0.5)	37 (1.5)	54 (2.1)	60 (2.4)	366 (14.5)
Average rainy days (≥ 1.0 mm)	4.5	4.0	4.1	2.7	1.1	0.2	0.1	0.5	1.6	3.7	4.4	5.6	32.5
Average relative humidity (%)	50	54	48	45	40	32	25	30	43	55	54	52	44
Mean monthly sunshine hours	226	223	260	294	356	382	382	358	295	259	220	218	3,473
Source: Agencia Estatal de Meteorología (1981–2010)

Climate data for Vilaflor (altitude: 1,378 metres (4,521 feet)
Month	Jan	Feb	Mar	Apr	May	Jun	Jul	Aug	Sep	Oct	Nov	Dec	Year
Mean daily maximum °C (°F)	13.5 (56.3)	14.4 (57.9)	16.0 (60.8)	16.1 (61.0)	18.3 (64.9)	21.2 (70.2)	27.4 (81.3)	27.9 (82.2)	23.5 (74.3)	18.7 (65.7)	16.0 (60.8)	14.5 (58.1)	19.0 (66.2)
Daily mean °C (°F)	9.4 (48.9)	10.2 (50.4)	11.7 (53.1)	11.9 (53.4)	13.8 (56.8)	16.7 (62.1)	22.7 (72.9)	23.0 (73.4)	19.2 (66.6)	14.4 (57.9)	11.4 (52.5)	10.0 (50.0)	14.7 (58.5)
Mean daily minimum °C (°F)	5.4 (41.7)	6.0 (42.8)	7.3 (45.1)	7.2 (45.0)	9.5 (49.1)	12.2 (54.0)	18.0 (64.4)	18.5 (65.3)	14.8 (58.6)	10.4 (50.7)	8.2 (46.8)	7.0 (44.6)	10.2 (50.4)
Average precipitation mm (inches)	49.4 (1.94)	51.2 (2.02)	34.1 (1.34)	24.4 (0.96)	2.7 (0.11)	0.4 (0.02)	0.0 (0.0)	0.8 (0.03)	7.5 (0.30)	33.8 (1.33)	70.6 (2.78)	56.2 (2.21)	366.1 (14.41)
Source: Gobierno de Canarias (Temperatures:1983–1995; Precipitation:1945–1997)

Buenavista del Norte

Climate chart (precipitation, max. and min. temperature)
J	F	M	A	M	J	J	A	S	O	N	D
167 17 12	95 17 11	70 17 12	18 17 12	12 19 13	9 20 14	1 22 17	3 23 18	4 23 17	90 21 16	207 19 15	122 17 13
- █ Average max. and min. temperatures in °C
- █ Precipitation totals in mm
Imperial conversion
J	F	M	A	M	J	J	A	S	O	N	D
6.6 63 54	3.7 63 52	2.8 63 54	0.7 63 54	0.5 66 55	0.4 68 57	0 72 63	0.1 73 64	0.2 73 63	3.5 70 61	8.1 66 59	4.8 63 55
- █ Average max. and min. temperatures in °F
- █ Precipitation totals in inches

=== Water ===
The volcanic ground of Tenerife, which is of a porous and permeable character, is generally the reason why the soil can maximise the absorption of water on an island of low rainfall, with condensation in forested areas and frost deposition on the summit of the island also contributing to the cause.

Given the irregularity of precipitation and geological conditions on the island, dam construction has been avoided, so most of the water (90 percent) comes from wells and from water galleries (horizontal tunnels bored into the volcano) of which there are thousands on the island, important systems that serve to extract its hydrological resources. These tunnels are very hazardous, with pockets of volcanic gas or carbon dioxide, causing rapid death.

=== Pollution and air quality ===
The Canary Islands have low levels of air pollution thanks to the lack of factories and industry, and to the trade winds, which naturally carry away contaminated air from the islands. According to official data from Spain's Health and Industry Ministry, Tenerife is one of the cleanest places in the country, with an air pollution index below the national average. Despite this, there are still agents which affect pollution levels in the island, the main polluting agents being the refinery at Santa Cruz, the thermal power plants at Las Caletillas and Granadilla, and road traffic, increased by the high level of tourism in the island. In addition to the island of Tenerife, as on La Palma, light pollution must also be controlled to help the astrophysical observatories located on the island's summits. Water is generally of a very high quality, and the Ministry of Health and Consumption has catalogued all the beaches of the island of Tenerife as waters suitable for bathing.

== Geology ==
Map of Tenerife

Tenerife is a rugged volcanic island, sculpted by successive eruptions throughout its history. There are four historically recorded volcanic eruptions, none of which have resulted in casualties. The first occurred in 1704, when the Arafo, Fasnia, and Siete Fuentes volcanoes erupted simultaneously. Two years later, in 1706, the greatest eruption occurred at Trevejo. This volcano produced great quantities of lava, which buried the city and port of Garachico. The last eruption of the 18th century happened in 1798 at Cañadas de Teide, in Chahorra. The most recent eruption – in 1909 – formed the Chinyero cinder cone in the municipality of Santiago del Teide.

The island is located between 28° and 29° N and the 16° and 17° W meridian. It is situated north of the Tropic of Cancer, occupying a central position between the other Canary Islands of Gran Canaria, La Gomera, and La Palma. The island is about 300 km (186 mi) from the African coast, and approximately 1,000 km (621 mi) from the Iberian Peninsula. Tenerife is the largest island of the Canary Islands archipelago, with a surface area of 2,034.38 km^{2} (785 sq mi) and has the longest coastline, amounting to 342 km (213 mi).

In addition, the highest point, Mount Teide, with an elevation of 3,715 m (12,188 ft) above sea level is the highest point in all of Spain, is also the third largest volcano in the world from its base in the bottom of the sea. For this reason, Tenerife is the 10th-highest island worldwide. It comprises about 200 small barren islets or large rocks, including Roques de Anaga, Roque de Garachico, and Fasnia, adding a further 213,835 m^{2} (2,301,701 sq ft) to the total area.

=== Origins and geological formation ===
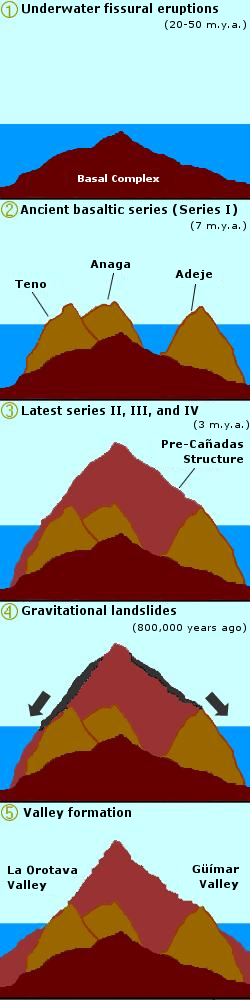
Tenerife formation

Tenerife is a volcanic island that has risen from the ocean floor over the last 20 million years.

Underwater fissural eruptions produced pillow lava, which are produced by the rapid cooling of the magma when it comes in contact with water, obtaining their peculiar shape. This pillow lava accumulated, constructing the base of the island underneath the sea. As this accumulation approached the water's surface, gases erupted from the magma due to the reduced surrounding pressure. The volcanic eruptions became more violent and had a more explosive character, and resulted in the formation of peculiar geological fragments.

After long-term accumulation of these fragments, the birth of the island occurred at the end of the Miocene epoch. The zones on Tenerife known as Macizo de Teno, Macizo de Anaga, and Macizo de Adeje were formed seven million years ago; these formations are called the Ancient Basaltic Series or Series I. These zones were actually three separate islands lying in what is now the extreme west, east, and south of Tenerife.

A second volcanic cycle called the Post-Miocene Formations or Latest Series II, III, IV began three million years ago. This was a much more intense volcanic cycle that united the Macizo de Teno, Macizo de Anaga, and Macizo de Adeje into a single island. This new structure, called the Pre-Cañadas Structure (Edificio pre-Cañadas), would serve as the foundation for what is known as the Cañadas Structure I. The Cañadas Structure I experienced various collapses and emitted explosive material that produced the area known as Bandas del sur (in the present-day south-southeast of Tenerife).

Subsequently, upon the ruins of Cañadas Structure I emerged Cañadas Structure II, which was 2,500 metres (8,200 ft) above sea level and emerged with intense explosive activity. About one million years ago, the Dorsal Range (Cordillera Dorsal) emerged by means of fissural volcanic activity occurring amidst the remains of the older Ancient Basaltic Series (Series I). This Dorsal Range emerged as the highest and the longest volcanic structure in the Canary Islands; it was 1,600 metres (5,200 ft) high and 25 kilometres (16 mi) long.

About 800,000 years ago, two gravitational landslides occurred, giving rise to the present-day valleys of La Orotava and Güímar. Finally, around 200,000 years ago, the giant Icod landslide occurred followed by eruptions that raised the Pico Viejo-Teide in the centre of the island, over the Las Cañadas caldera.

=== Orography and landscape ===
The uneven and steep orography of the island and its variety of climates has resulted in a diversity of landscapes and geographical and geological formations, from the Teide National Park with its extensive pine forests, juxtaposed against the volcanic landscape at the summit of Teide and Malpaís de Güímar, to the Acantilados de Los Gigantes (Cliffs of the Giants) with its vertical precipices. Semidesert areas exist in the south with drought-resistant plants. Other areas range from those protected and enclosed in mountains such as Montaña Roja and Montaña Pelada, the valleys and forests with subtropical vegetation and climate, to those with deep gorges and precipices, such as at Anaga and Teno.

==== Central Heights ====
The principal structures in Tenerife make the central highlands, with the Teide–Pico Viejo complex and the Las Cañadas areas as most prominent. It comprises a semi-caldera of about 130 km^{2} (50 sq mi) in area, originated by several geological processes explained under the Origin and formation section. The area is partially occupied by the Teide-Pico Viejo stratovolcano and is completed by materials ejected during the various eruptions. A known formation called Los Azulejos, composed by green-tinted rocks were created by hydrothermal processes.

South of La Caldera is Guajara Mountain, which has an elevation of 2,718 metres (8,917 feet), rising above Teide National Park. At the bottom is an endorheic basin flanked with very fine sedimentary material which has been deposited from its volcanic processes, and is known as Llano de Ucanca.

The peak of Teide, at 3,715 metres (12,188 feet) above sea level and more than 7,500 metres (24,606 feet) above the ocean floor, is the highest point of the island, Spanish territory, and in the Atlantic Ocean. The volcano is the third largest on the planet, and its central location, substantial size, looming silhouette in the distance and its snowy landscape in winter give it a unique nature. The original settlers considered Teide a god and Teide was a place of worship.

In 1954, the entire area around it was designated a national park, with further expansion later. In addition, in June 2007 it was recognised by UNESCO as a World Heritage site. To the west lies the volcano Pico Viejo (Old Peak). On one side of it is the volcano Chahorra o Narices del Teide, whose last eruption occurred near Mount Teide in 1798.

Teide is one of the 16 Decade Volcanoes identified by the International Association of Volcanology and Chemistry of the Earth's Interior (IAVCEI) as worthy of particular study due to its history of large, destructive eruptions and proximity to populated areas.

Tallest mountains on Tenerife:

Peak	Elevation (meters)	Elevation (feet)
Mount Teide	3,715	12,198
Pico Viejo	3,135	10,285
Montaña Blanca	2,748	9,016
Guajara	2,718	8,917

==== Massifs ====
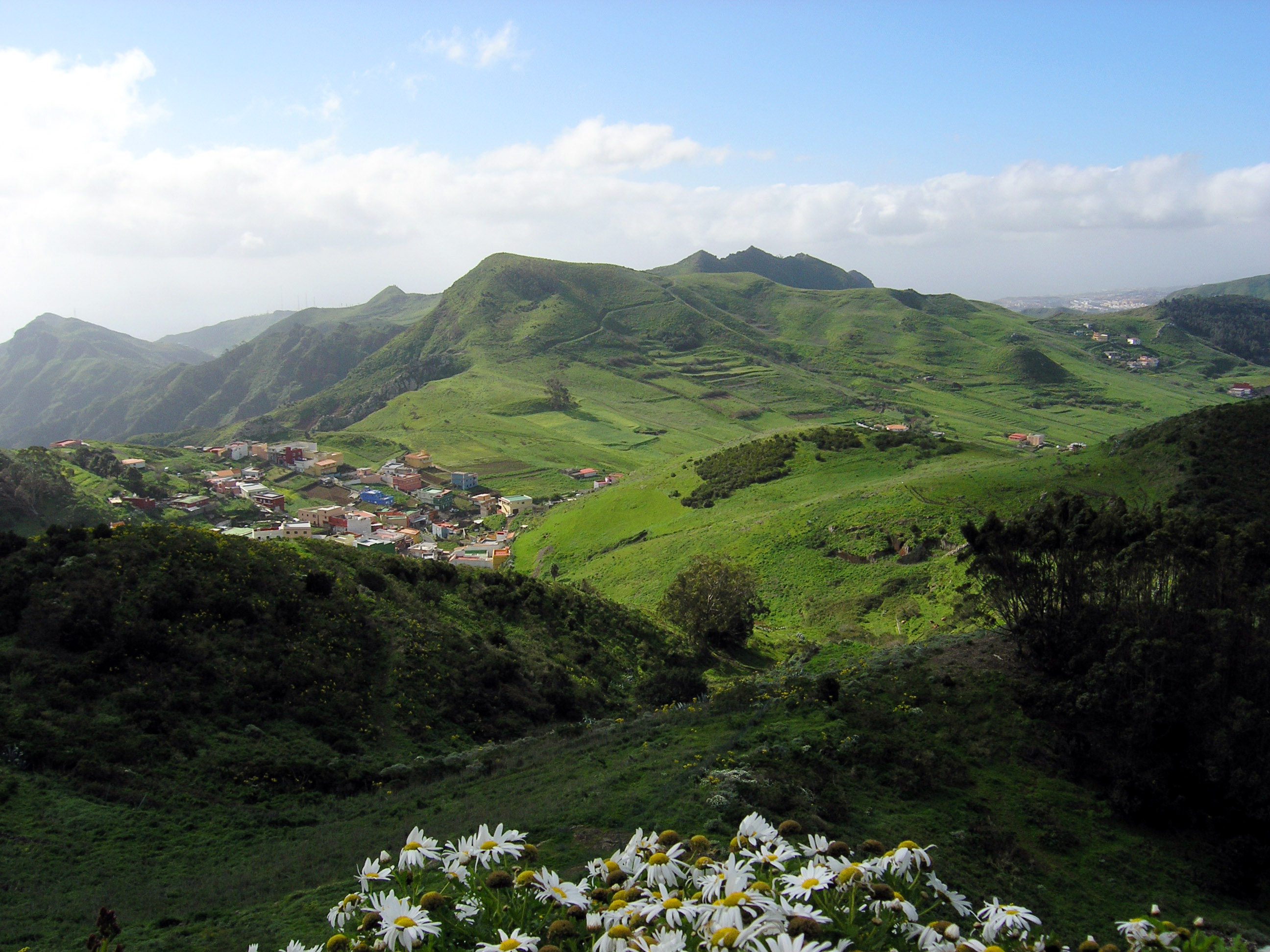
The uneven contours of the Anaga massif

The Anaga massif (Macizo de Anaga), at the northeastern end of the island, has an irregular and rugged topographical profile where, despite its generally modest elevations, the Cruz de Taborno reaches a height of 1,024 metres (3,360 feet). Due to the age of its material (5.7 million years), its deep erosive processes, and the dense network of dikes piercing the massif, its surface exposes numerous outcroppings of both phonolitic and trachytic origin. A large number of steep-walled gorges are present, penetrating deeply into the terrain. Vertical cuts dominate the Anagan coast, with infrequent beaches of rocks or black sand between them; the few that exist generally coincide with the mouths of gorges.

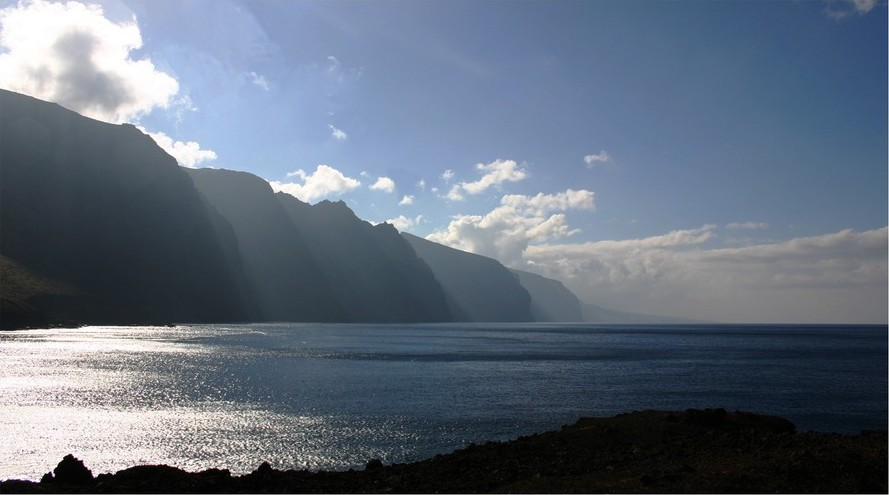
Teno massif—Cliffs of the Giants area

The Teno massif (Macizo de Teno) is located on the northwestern edge of the island. Like Anaga, it includes an area of outcroppings and deep gorges formed by erosion. However, the materials here are older (about 7.4 million years old). Mount Gala represents its highest elevation at 1,342 metres (4,403 feet). The most unusual landscape of this massif is found on its southern coast, where the Acantilados de Los Gigantes ("Cliffs of the Giants") present vertical walls reaching heights of 500 metres (1,600 feet) in some places.

The Adeje massif (Macizo de Adeje) is situated on the southern tip of the island. Its main landmark is the Roque del Conde ("Count's Rock"), with an elevation of 1,001 metres (3,284 feet). This massif is not as impressive as the others due to its diminished initial structure; in addition to the site's greater geologic age, it has undergone severe erosion, thereby losing its original appearance and extent.

==== Dorsals ====
The Dorsal mountain ridge or Dorsal of Pedro Gil covers the area from the start at Mount La Esperanza, at a height of about 750 m (2,461 ft), to the centre of the island, near the Caldera de Las Cañadas, with Izaña, as its highest point at 2,390 m (7,841 ft) (MSLP). These mountains were formed by basaltic fissural volcanism along one of the axes that gave rise to volcanism in this area.

The Abeque Dorsal was formed by a chain of volcanoes that joins the Teno with the central insular peak of Teide-Pico Viejo, starting from another of the three axes of Tenerife's geological structures. On this dorsal we find the historic volcano of Chinyero, whose last eruption happened in 1909.

The South Dorsal or Dorsal of Adeje is part of the last of the structural axes. The remains of this massive rock show the primordial land, also showing the alignment of small volcanic cones and rocks around this are in Tenerife's South.

==== Valleys and ravines ====
Valleys are another of the island's features. The most important are Valle de La Orotava and Valle de Güímar, both formed by the mass sliding of great quantities of material towards the sea, creating a depression of the land. Other valleys tend to be between hills formed by sediment deposits from nearby slopes, or simply wide ravines that have, over time, become typical valleys.

Tenerife has many ravines, a characteristic feature of the landscape caused by long-term erosion from surface runoff. Notable ravines include Ruiz, Fasnia, and Güímar, Infierno, and Erques, all of which have been designated protected natural areas by Canarian institutions.

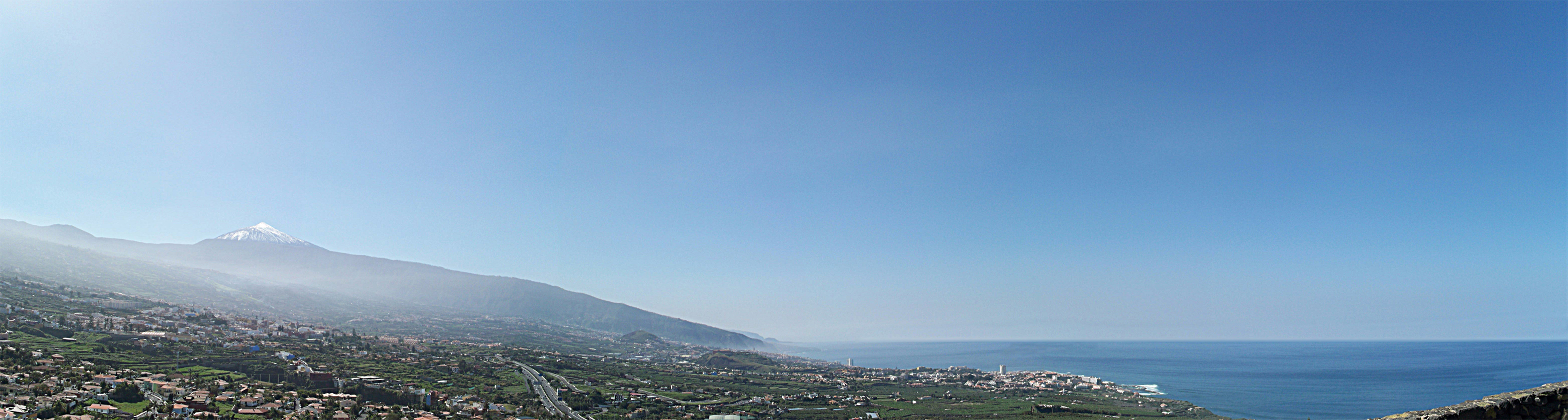
Panorama of Valle de La Orotava

==== Coastline ====
The coasts of Tenerife are typically rugged and steep, particularly on the north of the island. However, the island has 67.14 kilometres (41.72 miles) of beaches, such as the one at El Médano, surpassed only in this respect by the island of Fuerteventura. There are many black sand pebble beaches on the northern coast, while on the south and south-west coast of the island, the beaches have typically much finer and clearer sand with lighter tones.

==== Volcanic tubes ====
Lava tubes are volcanic caves, usually in the form of tunnels, formed within lava flows of varying fluidity during the reogenética phase of the activity. Among the many existing volcanic tubes on the island stands out the Cueva del Viento, located in the northern town of Icod de los Vinos, which is the largest volcanic tunnel in the European Union and one of the largest in the world, for a long time considered the largest in the world.

== Flora and fauna ==
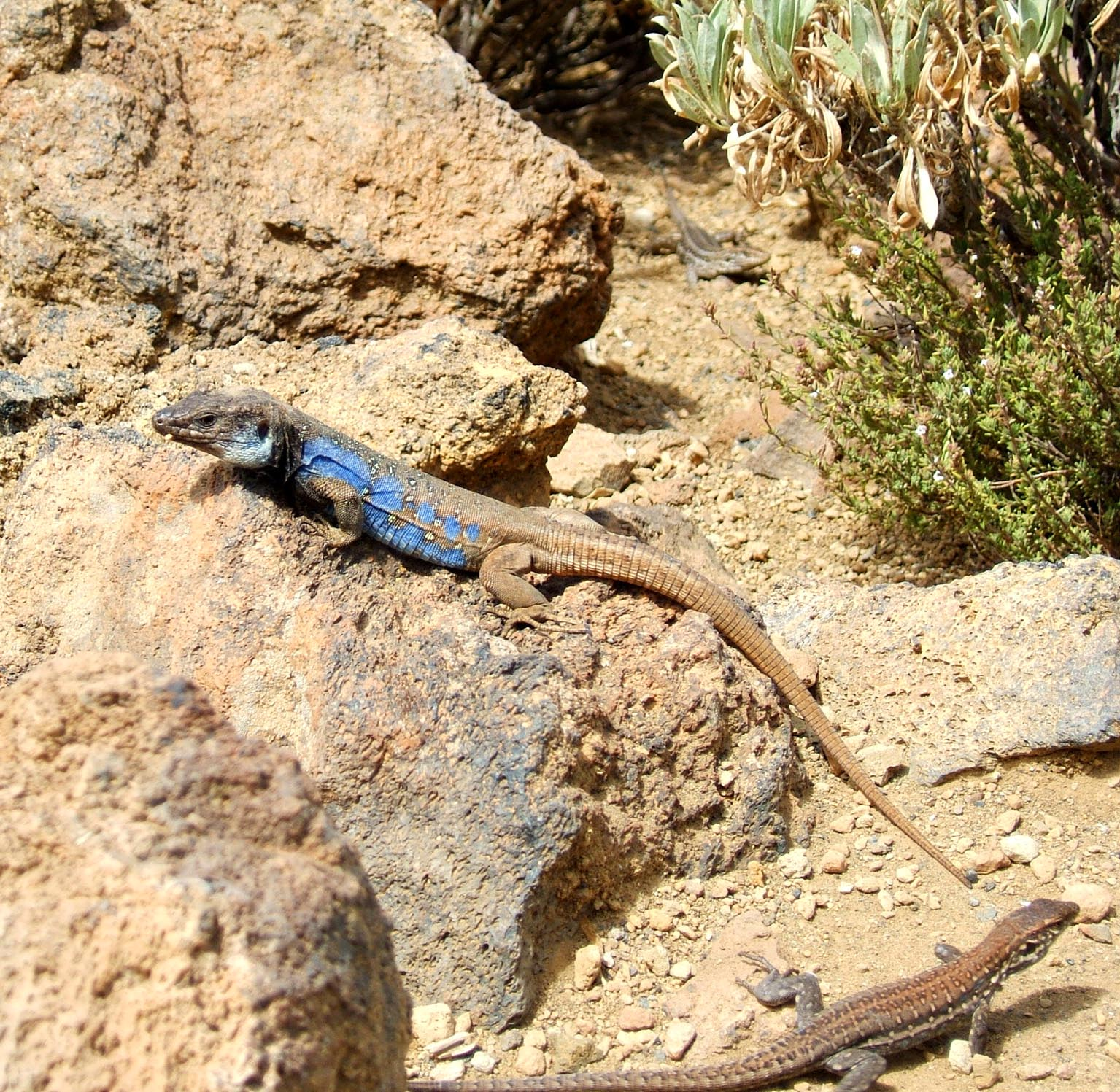
Gallotia galloti, a wall lizard species endemic to Tenerife

Tenerife is one of the most biologically diverse islands in the Canary Islands and has one of the highest concentrations of endemic species in Europe. Its varied landscapes and microclimates support more than 1,400 plant species, including over 100 species endemic to the island. Habitats range from coastal scrublands and thermophilic woodlands to laurel forests, Canary Island pine forests, and the high-mountain environments surrounding Teide.

Among the island's best-known plants are the Canary Island dragon tree (Dracaena draco), Canary Island date palm (Phoenix canariensis), and Canary Island pine (Pinus canariensis). The dragon tree is one of the official natural symbols of Tenerife.

Tenerife's fauna includes approximately 400 species of fish, 56 bird species, five reptiles, two amphibians, 13 land mammals, thousands of invertebrates, and several species of sea turtles and cetaceans. Notable endemic animals include the Tenerife lizard (Gallotia galloti) and the blue chaffinch (Fringilla teydea), which is also an official natural symbol of the island.

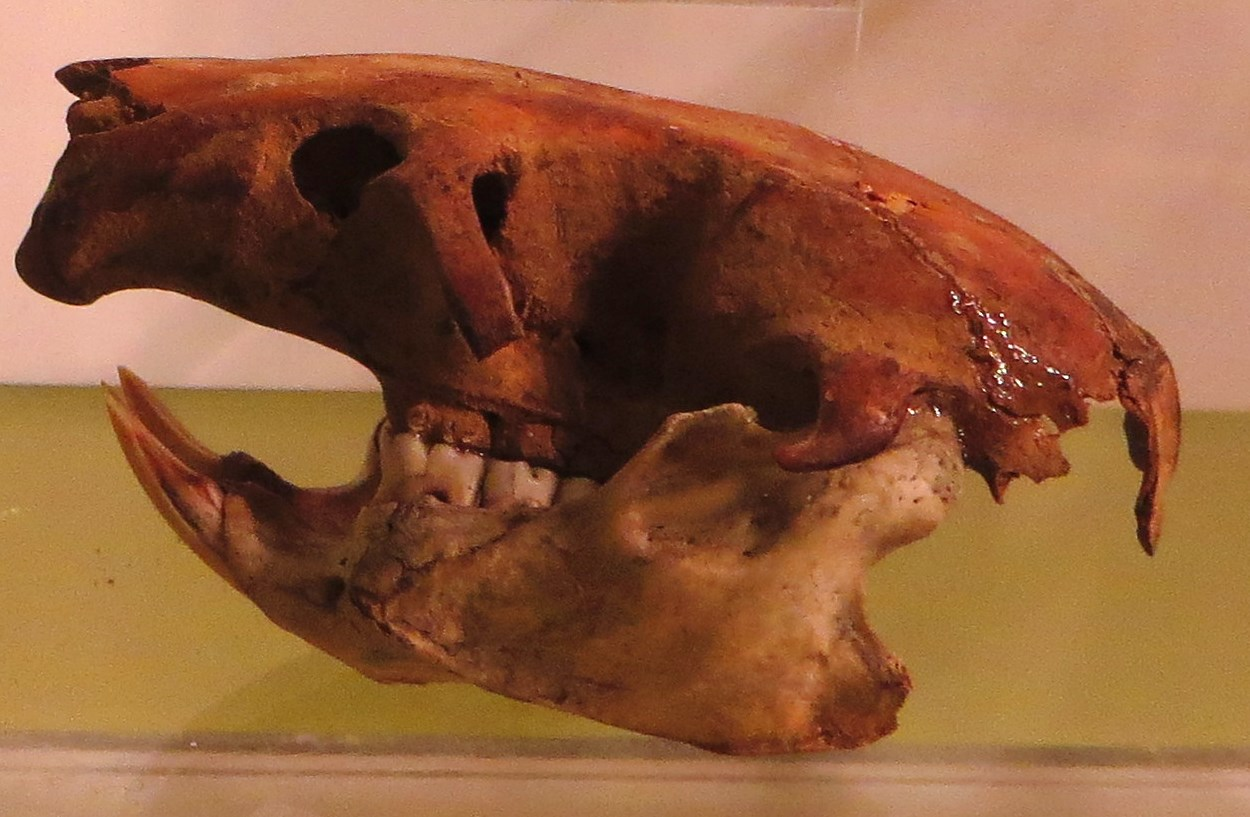
Skull of Canariomys bravoi

Before human settlement, Tenerife was home to a number of endemic species that are now extinct. These included the Tenerife giant rat (Canariomys bravoi), a rabbit-sized rodent known from Pliocene and Pleistocene deposits; the giant lizard (Gallotia goliath), which survived until about the fifteenth century and could exceed 1.2 metres (3.9 feet) in length; the slender-billed greenfinch (Chloris aurelioi); the long-legged bunting (Emberiza alcoveri), a flightless songbird known from cave deposits; and the Tenerife giant tortoise (Geochelone burchardi), which became extinct before human arrival on the island.

== Protected natural areas ==
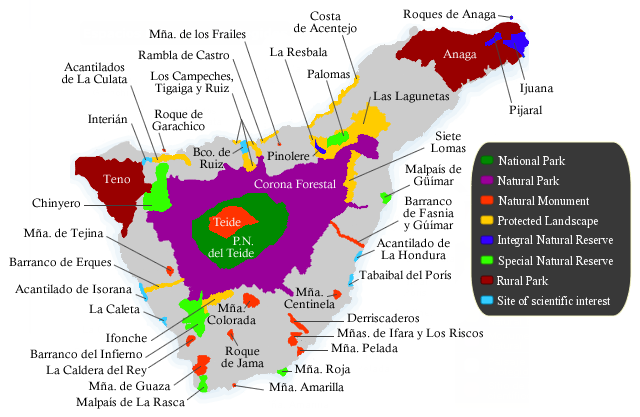
Map showing the classification of protected areas in Tenerife

Nearly half of the island territory (48.6 percent), is under protection from the Red Canaria de Espacios Naturales Protegidos (Canary Islands Network for Protected Natural Areas). Of the 146 protected sites under control of the network in the Canary Islands archipelago, a total of 43 are located in Tenerife, the most protected island in the group. The network has criteria that place areas under its observation under eight different categories of protection, all of which are represented in Tenerife. Aside from Parque Nacional del Teide, it includes the Parque Natural de Canarias (Crown Forest), two rural parks (Anaga and Teno), four integral natural reserves, six special natural reserves, a total of fourteen natural monuments, nine protected landscapes, and up to six sites of scientific interest. Also located on the island Macizo de Anaga since 2015 is the Biosphere Reserve, which has the largest number of endemic species in Europe.

In contrast to the land-based protected areas, Tenerife also boasts significant marine protected natural areas. Among these is the Zona de Especial Conservación Teno-Rasca (Teno-Rasca Special Area of Conservation), a marine protected area established in 2013. This marine protected area off the coast of Tenerife is known for its ecological significance and biodiversity, including resident populations of cetaceans such as bottlenose dolphins and pilot whales. It is also known as the Tenerife-La Gomera Marine Area and became the first European designated Whale Heritage Area in January 2021.

== Administrative divisions ==
=== Island government ===
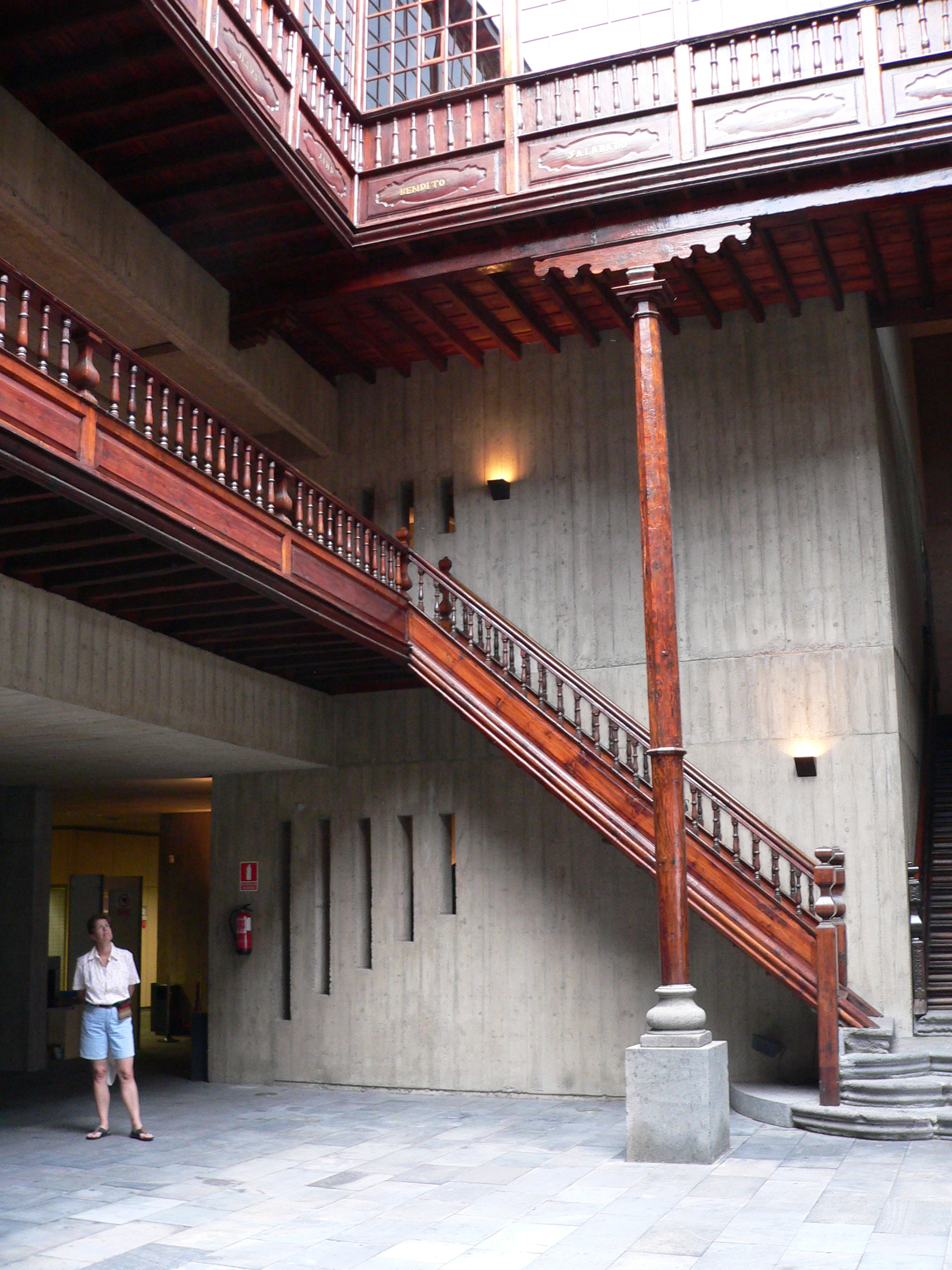
Building of the Presidency of the Canaries Autonomous Government in Santa Cruz

Tenerife is governed by the Cabildo Insular de Tenerife, which is headquartered in the Palacio Insular de Tenerife in Plaza de España, in the island capital of Santa Cruz de Tenerife. Established in March 1913, the Cabildo is responsible for the administration of the island. Unlike mainland Spain, where provinces have their own governing bodies, each island in the Canary Islands is governed by its own cabildo. The Cabildo's powers and responsibilities are set out in the Estatuto de Autonomía de Canarias and regulated by Law 14/1990 of 26 July 1990 concerning the legal regime of Canary Islands public administrations.

The Cabildo consists of the Presidency, Legislative Body, Government Council, Informative Commissions, and Spokesperson's Office.

=== Regional role ===
Tenerife forms part of the autonomous community of the Canary Islands and has a special status within the European Union that includes lower tax rates than most other regions of Spain. The island capital, Santa Cruz de Tenerife, hosts half of the departments of the Canary Islands government and is one of the seats of the regional parliament.

=== Municipalities ===
Tenerife, which forms part of the province of Santa Cruz de Tenerife, is divided into 31 municipalities, the largest number of any island in the Canary Islands. Only three municipalities are landlocked: Tegueste, El Tanque, and Vilaflor de Chasna. Vilaflor is the highest municipality in the Canary Islands, with its administrative centre located at approximately 1,400 metres (4,600 ft) above sea level. The largest municipality by area is La Orotava, which covers 207.31 square kilometres (80.04 sq mi) and includes much of Teide National Park. The smallest municipality on Tenerife, and in the Canary Islands, is Puerto de la Cruz, with an area of 8.73 square kilometres (3.37 sq mi).

=== Counties ===
Tenerife is traditionally divided into several counties (comarcas), which have no official administrative status but are widely recognised by geographers. The principal counties are Abona, Acentejo, Anaga, Valle de Güímar, Icod, Isora, Valle de La Orotava, and Teno.

== Demographics ==
According to INE data, Tenerife had an officially estimated population of 974,003 inhabitants as of 1 January 2026, making it the most populous of the Canary Islands and the most populous island of Spain. Approximately 22.0 percent of the population lived in the island capital, Santa Cruz de Tenerife, while about 40 percent lived in the metropolitan area centred on Santa Cruz de Tenerife and San Cristóbal de La Laguna. Together with the neighbouring municipalities of Tegueste and El Rosario, these communities formed a continuous urban area with 581,947 inhabitants, representing about 60 percent of the island's residents. As of 2024, the island also contained the Tenerife South metropolitan area, centred on Arona, Adeje and Granadilla de Abona, with 215,532 inhabitants, and the La Orotava Valley metropolitan area in northern Tenerife, with 111,606 inhabitants.

As of 2024, the largest municipalities after Santa Cruz de Tenerife were San Cristóbal de La Laguna (160,258), Arona (86,624), Granadilla de Abona (57,143), Adeje (50,549), La Orotava (42,585), Los Realejos (37,522) and Puerto de la Cruz (31,377). Vilaflor was the smallest municipality, with 1,501 inhabitants.

Tenerife has the largest foreign population in the Canary Islands and is the most multicultural island in the archipelago. As of 2024, foreign nationals made up 14 percent of the island's population and 44.9 percent of all registered foreigners in the Canary Islands. The island also contains the largest non-European Union foreign population in the archipelago. Several sources have noted that Tenerife's population exceeds one million when long-term visitors and other residents not included in official population statistics are taken into account.

The island experienced rapid population growth during the late twentieth and early twenty-first centuries. Its population increased by more than 200,000 people between 1990 and 2007, rising from 663,306 to 865,070. Growth was driven largely by immigration and exceeded the Spanish national average during that period.

Homelessness has become a growing social issue on the island. According to Caritas data published in 2026, more than 2,800 people were experiencing homelessness in Tenerife. The largest concentrations were in Santa Cruz de Tenerife and San Cristóbal de La Laguna, with Santa Cruz de Tenerife accounting for more than one-third of the total and recording the highest number of homeless people of any municipality in the Canary Islands. Contributing factors include family breakdown, unemployment, difficulties accessing housing, addiction and mental health problems.

== Economy ==
Tenerife is the economic capital of the Canary Islands. It has the highest gross domestic product (GDP) in the archipelago, estimated at €25 billion, with a GDP per capita of around €26,000. More than 7.3 million tourists visited Tenerife in 2024, making it by far the most visited island in the archipelago and one of Spain's leading tourist destinations. Although tourism now dominates economic activity, the island's economy also reflects centuries of agricultural production, trade, commerce and industrial development. According to a report published by the Tenerife Economic Observatory, the service sector accounted for approximately 78% of economic output, followed by construction (11.29%), industry (5.80%), energy (2.85%) and the primary sector (1.98%).

=== Traditional economy ===
For much of its history, Tenerife's economy was based on export agriculture. Sugar cane, wine, cochineal and later bananas connected the island to external markets and shaped much of its rural landscape. Although agriculture contributes less than 10% of the island's GDP, it remains important to the local economy and cultural landscape.

==== Agriculture ====
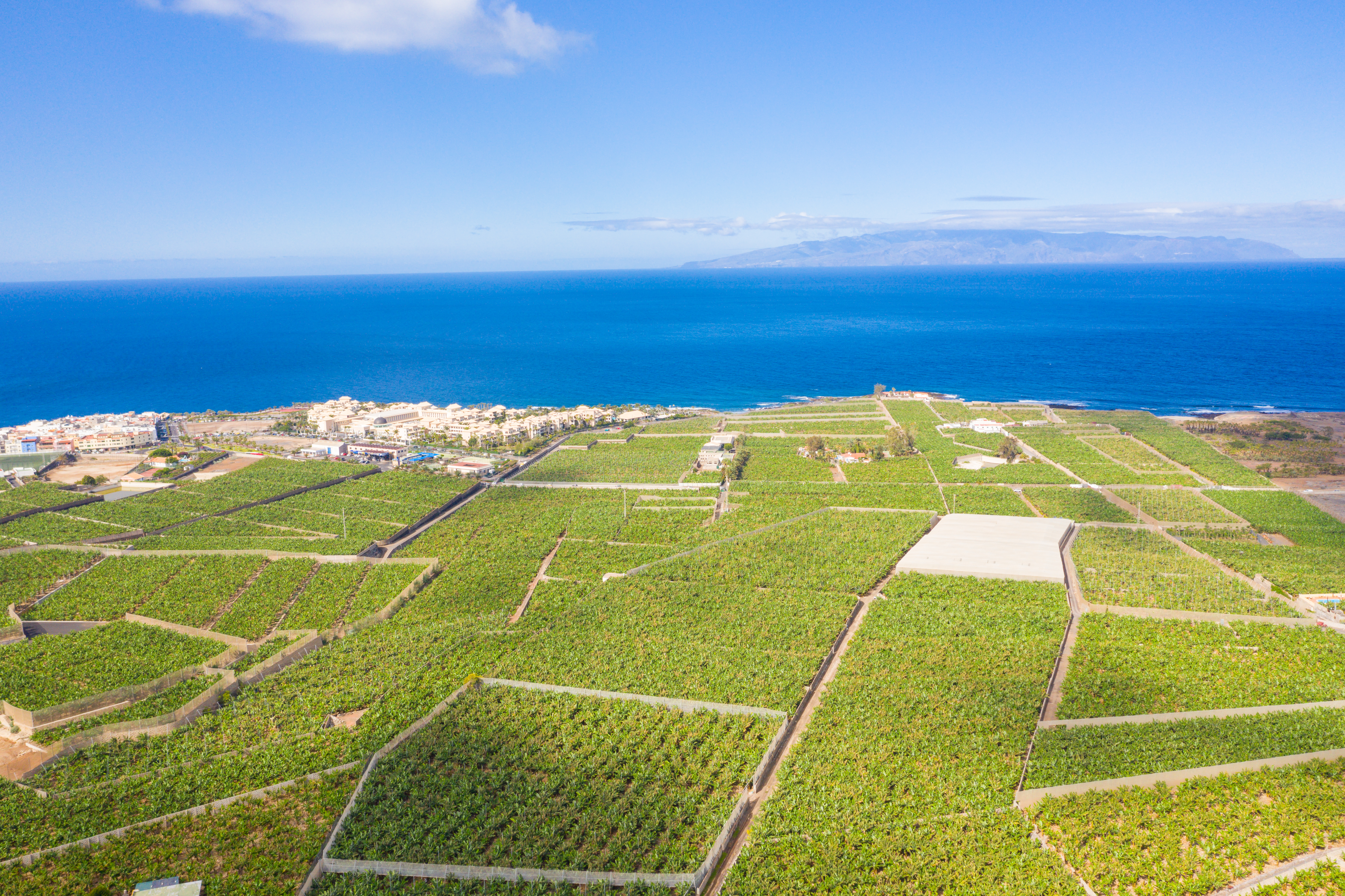
Banana plantations in the western coastline (Guía de Isora)

Agricultural production varies according to altitude and climate. Bananas and tomatoes are cultivated primarily on the coastal lowlands for export to mainland Spain and other European markets. Potatoes, tobacco and maize are grown at intermediate elevations, while onion production is concentrated in the drier south.

Bananas are Tenerife's most important agricultural crop. The island produces more bananas than any other island in the Canary archipelago. Annual production has been estimated at 150,000 tonnes, down from a peak of about 200,000 tonnes in 1986. Banana cultivation occupies about 4,200 hectares, and more than 90% of production is exported. Other important crops include tomatoes, grapes, potatoes and flowers.

==== Fishing ====
Fishing remains an important contributor to the local economy. The Canary Islands constitute Spain's second most important fishing region.

=== Modern economy ===
==== Industry and commerce ====
Commerce accounts for almost 20% of Tenerife's GDP, with most commercial activity concentrated in Santa Cruz de Tenerife. Industry is dominated by petroleum refining, which accounts for approximately 10% of the island's GDP. The refinery at Santa Cruz de Tenerife supplies petroleum products not only to the Canary Islands but also to markets in the Iberian Peninsula, Africa and South America.

==== Energy ====
In 2009, Tenerife had an installed electrical generation capacity of 910 MW, most of it derived from petroleum-based fuels. Renewable energy sources included 37 MW of wind power and 79 MW of solar capacity.

=== Visitor economy ===
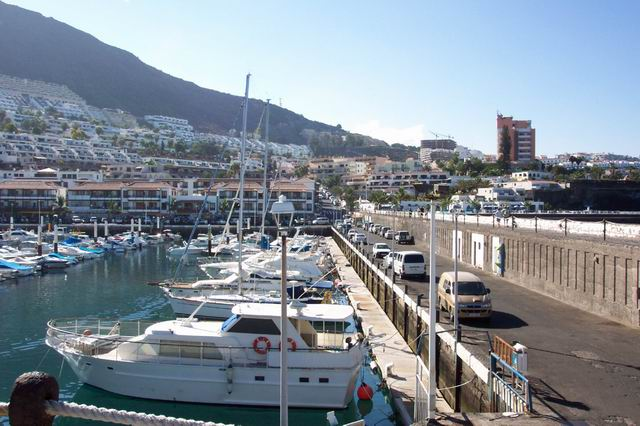
Harbour

Tourism emerged as Tenerife's leading economic sector during the twentieth century and is now the island's principal economic activity.

==== Development of tourism ====
Organised tourism began to develop in the late nineteenth century, when visitors from Spain, the United Kingdom and northern Europe started travelling to the island. Early tourism was concentrated in Puerto de la Cruz and Santa Cruz de Tenerife and was facilitated by improved maritime connections, including passenger services operated by companies such as the Yeoward Brothers Shipping Line.

Tourism expanded rapidly during the twentieth century. While the earliest tourist development focused on Puerto de la Cruz and the Orotava Valley, by 1980 the industry had become concentrated in the south of the island.

==== Resort areas ====
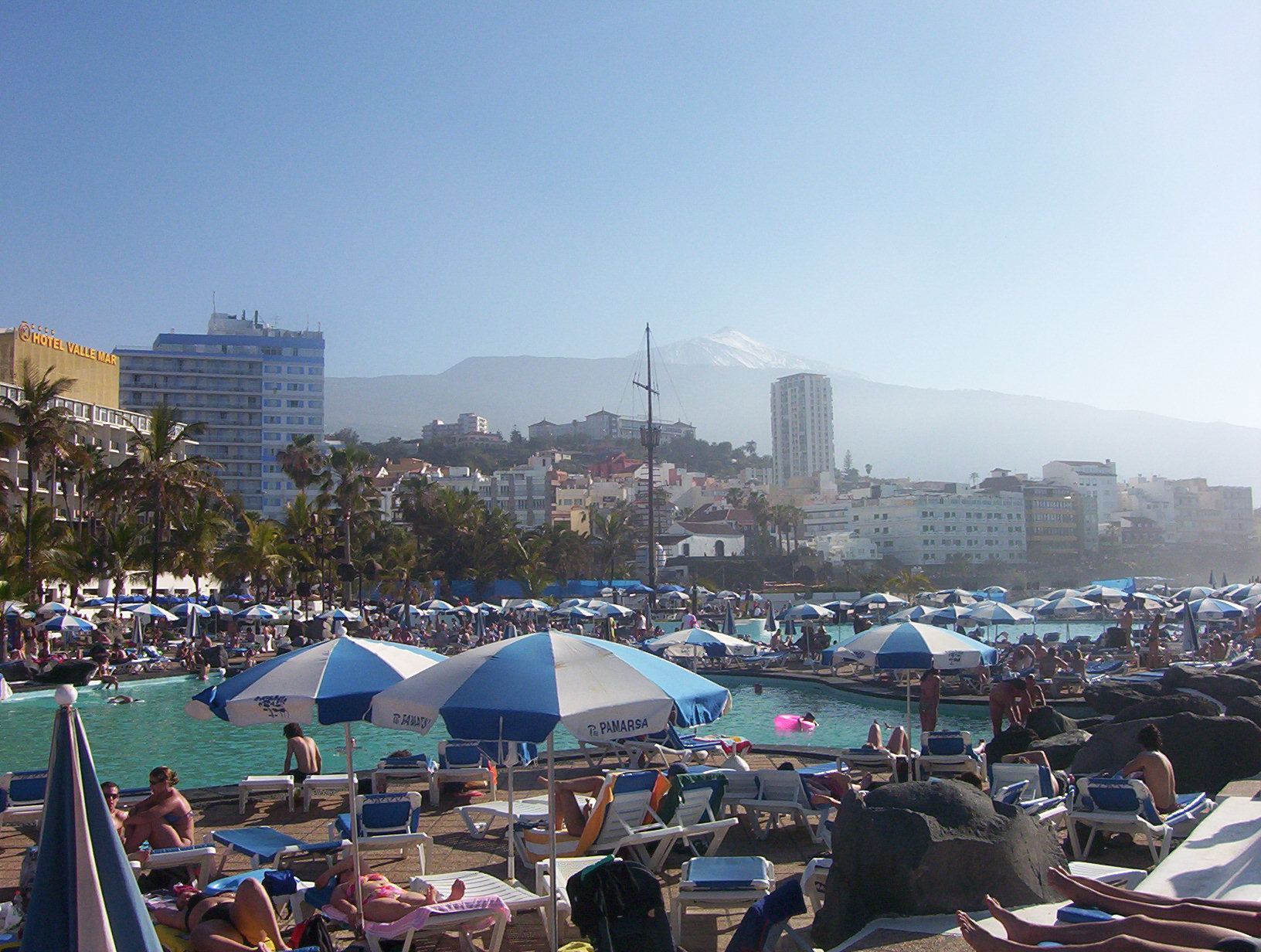
Puerto de la Cruz, in the North, during winter, featuring background snowy mountains

The principal tourist centres of southern Tenerife include Los Cristianos, Playa de las Américas and Costa Adeje, which have developed into major international resort destinations. In northern Tenerife, Puerto de la Cruz remains the island's principal historic resort centre.

==== Tourist attractions ====
Tourist attractions in southern Tenerife include beaches, water parks and marine wildlife excursions. Whale-watching is particularly popular, with numerous boats operating from Puerto Colón in Costa Adeje. The deep waters surrounding the island support several resident pods of pilot whales.

In northern Tenerife, Puerto de la Cruz is home to Loro Parque, one of the world's most visited zoological parks.

== Education, research and innovation ==
=== Education ===
Formal education in Tenerife began with the religious orders. In 1530, the Dominican Order established a chair of philosophy at the Convent of La Concepción in San Cristóbal de La Laguna. Despite this early foundation, the island remained largely without formal educational institutions until well into the 18th century.

Educational opportunities began to expand through the efforts of the Royal Economic Society of Friends of the Country (Spanish: Real Sociedad Económica de Amigos del País), which established several schools in La Laguna. In 1846, it founded a secondary education institute to replace the former University of San Fernando. An annex added in 1850 became the first teachers' college in the Canary Islands. In 1866, it was reorganised as the Higher Teacher Training School (Spanish: Escuela Normal Superior de Magisterio).

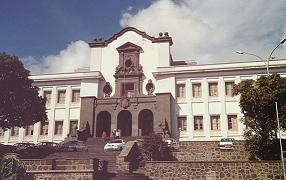
University of La Laguna, the oldest and largest university in the Canary Islands

During the late 19th and early 20th centuries, educational development accelerated across the island. Between 1929 and 1933, the number of schools nearly doubled. This progress was interrupted by the Spanish Civil War and the subsequent dictatorship of Francisco Franco, during which religious institutions continued to play an important role in education. The 1970 General Law of Education (Spanish: Ley General de Educación) shifted the emphasis toward public education, which expanded further during Spain's transition to democracy.

Today, Tenerife has 301 preschool centres, 297 primary schools, 140 secondary schools and 86 post-secondary institutions. Higher education is centred on the University of La Laguna, the largest university in the Canary Islands. Other institutions operating on the island include the Universidad Nacional de Educación a Distancia (National University of Distance Education), the Universidad Internacional Menéndez Pelayo (Menéndez Pelayo International University), Universidad Alfonso X el Sabio and the University of Vic School of Tourism in Santa Cruz de Tenerife. The European University of the Canary Islands, located in La Orotava, was the first private university established in the Canary Islands.

=== Research and innovation ===
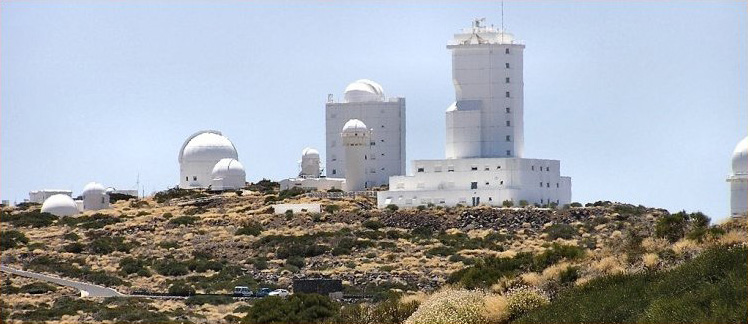
Teide Observatory, part of the Instituto de Astrofísica de Canarias (Astrophysics Institute of the Canaries)

Research activity in Tenerife is supported by institutions working in fields including astrophysics, tropical medicine, agriculture, renewable energy, volcanology and oceanography. Among them are the Astrophysics Institute of the Canary Islands and the Teide Observatory.

The University of La Laguna hosts several specialised research centres and institutes, including the Antonio González Bio-Organic Institute and the Institute of Tropical Diseases. The latter is one of seven institutions in Spain's Network of Tropical Disease Research Centres (RICET). The university also supports research in the humanities, social sciences, law and business through a number of specialised institutes and centres.

Additional research institutions on the island include the Institute of Hispanic Studies of the Canary Islands, the Spanish National Research Council delegation in La Laguna, the Canary Islands Institute for Agricultural Research, the Canary Islands Institute of Studies, the International Centre for the Conservation of Heritage, the Canary Islands Institute of Technology, the Canary Islands Volcanological Institute, the Technological Institute of Renewable Energy and the Canary Islands Oceanographic Institute.

== Healthcare ==
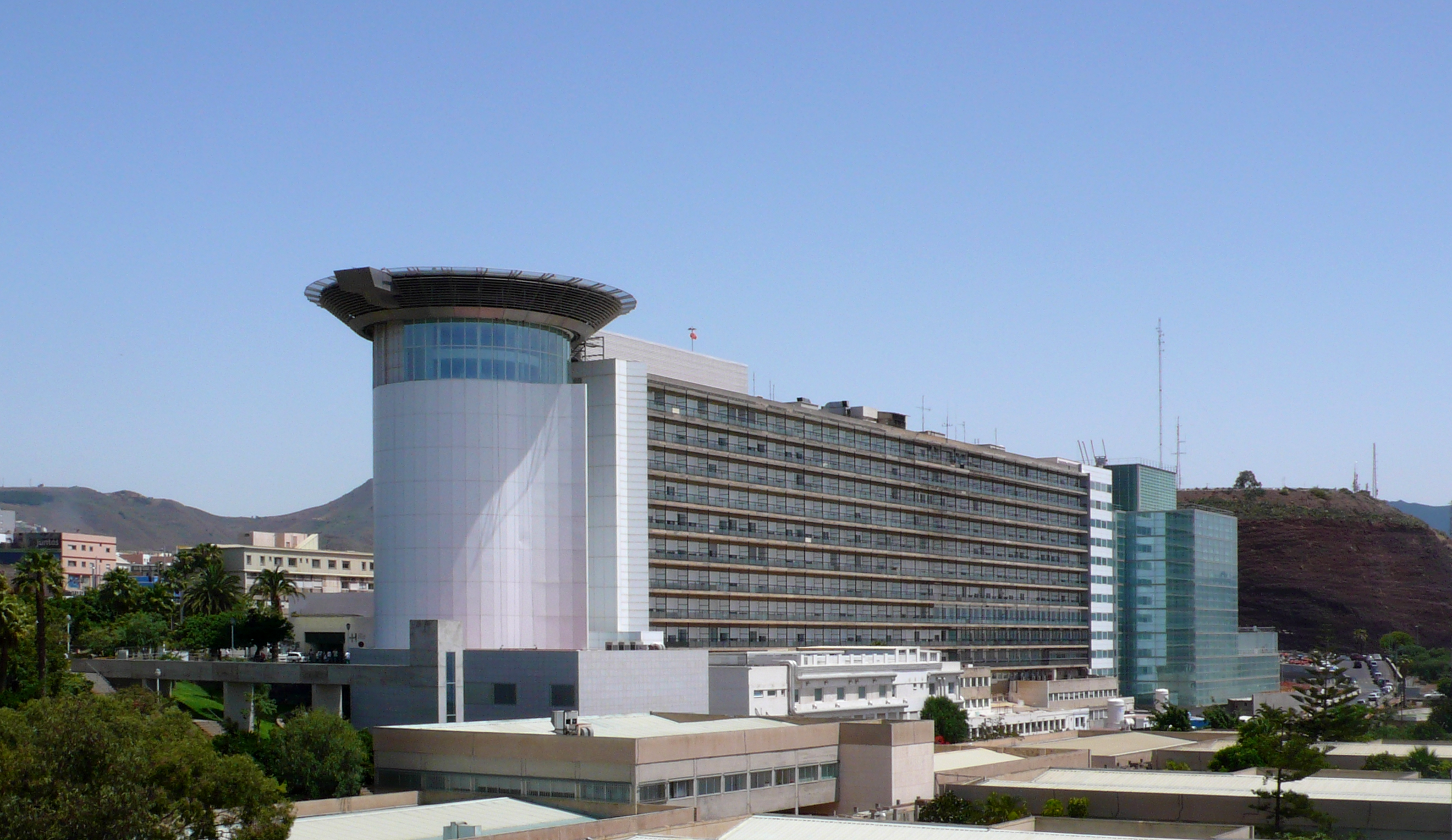
Hospital Universitario de Canarias

Healthcare in Tenerife is provided through a network of university, regional and community hospitals, supported by primary care centres and specialised clinics. The principal facilities are the Hospital Universitario de Canarias and the Hospital Universitario Nuestra Señora de Candelaria, both of which provide specialist services for the entire Canary Islands. The hospitals are affiliated with the education and research network of the University of La Laguna, although they are administered by different bodies within the regional health system. The Hospital Universitario Nuestra Señora de Candelaria is the largest hospital complex in the Canary Islands.

Healthcare services were expanded in the early 21st century with the construction of two additional regional hospitals. The Hospital del Norte de Tenerife in Icod de los Vinos opened in 2012, followed three years later by the Hospital del Sur de Tenerife in Arona in 2015. Both hospitals provide inpatient care, diagnostic services, emergency treatment, rehabilitation and ambulance services.

The island's healthcare infrastructure is further supported by 39 primary care centres and specialised clinics distributed throughout Tenerife.

== Museums ==
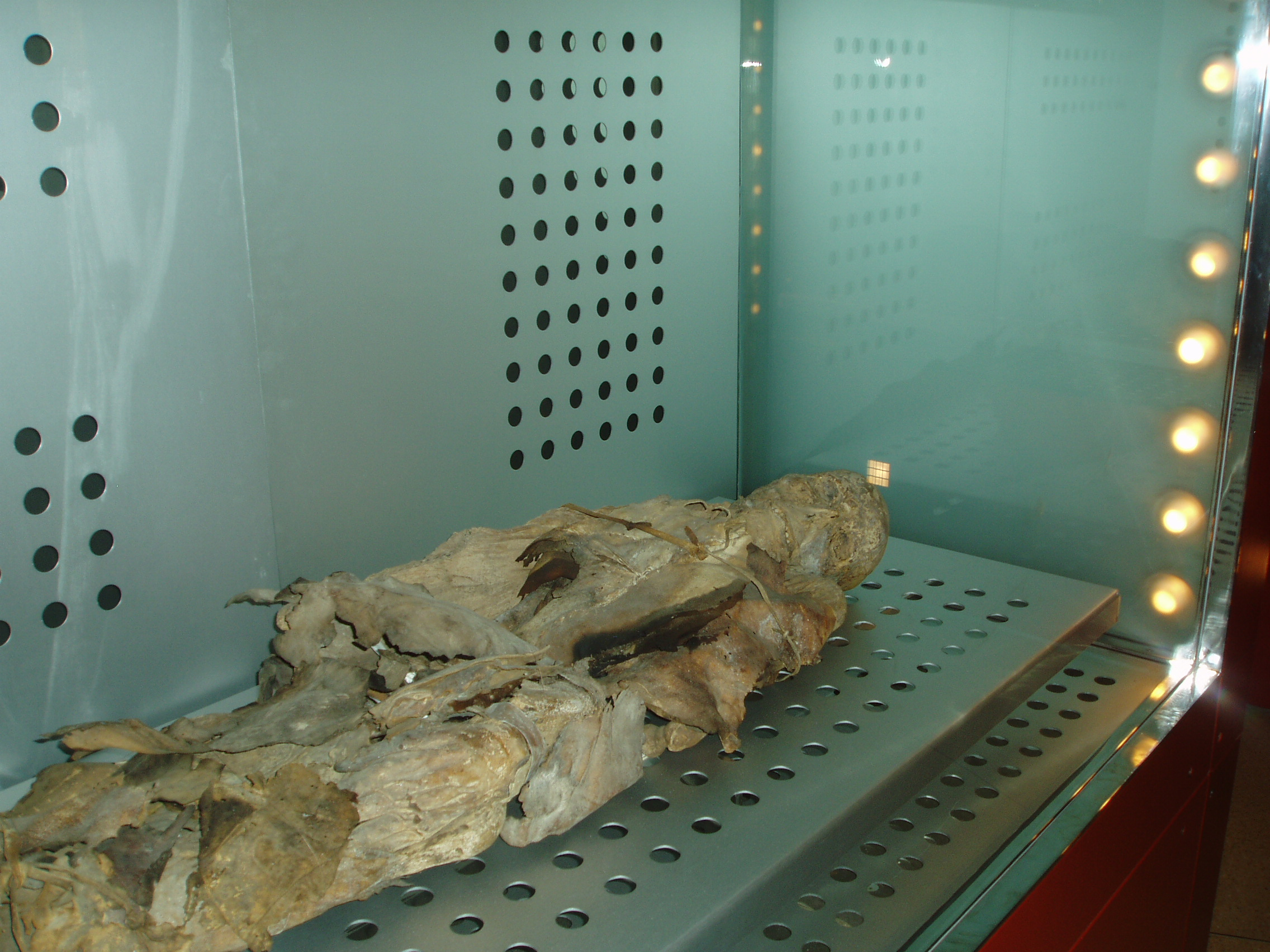
Guanche mummy in the Museo de la Naturaleza y el Hombre

Tenerife is home to numerous museums and cultural institutions, particularly in Santa Cruz de Tenerife and San Cristóbal de La Laguna. Many are administered by the Organismo Autónomo de Museos y Centros, a network of museums and research centres operated by the island government.

The island's principal museum is the Museum of Nature and Man in Santa Cruz de Tenerife. Combining archaeology, natural history, and bioanthropology, it is particularly noted for its collection of Guanche mummies and archaeological material relating to the Indigenous inhabitants of the Canary Islands.

Other major institutions include the Museum of the History of Tenerife in La Laguna, which documents the island's social, economic, and cultural development from the fifteenth century onward, and the Museum of Science and the Cosmos, an interactive museum developed in collaboration with the Instituto de Astrofísica de Canarias.

Contemporary art is represented by the Tenerife Espacio de las Artes (TEA) in Santa Cruz de Tenerife, which hosts exhibitions, archives, educational programmes, and cultural events. The island is also home to specialized museums devoted to anthropology, archaeology, fine arts, military history, traditional crafts, viticulture, and photography.

Several institutions focus on distinctive aspects of Tenerife's cultural heritage, including the Casa del Carnaval, dedicated to the history of the Carnival of Santa Cruz de Tenerife, and museums preserving the island's traditions of winemaking, beekeeping, and artisanal production.

== Culture and arts ==
=== Cultural development ===
Tenerife has produced notable literary, artistic, and intellectual figures since the early modern period. In the 16th and 17th centuries, Antonio de Viana, a native of La Laguna, composed the epic poem Antigüedades de las Islas Afortunadas (Antiquities of the Fortunate Isles), a work valued by anthropologists for its descriptions of Canarian life during the period.

The Enlightenment reached Tenerife, and literary and artistic figures of this era include the historian and writer José Viera y Clavijo, the poet and playwright Tomás de Iriarte y Oropesa, the playwright Ángel Guimerá y Jorge, the writer Mercedes Pinto, and the literary critic Domingo Pérez Minik.

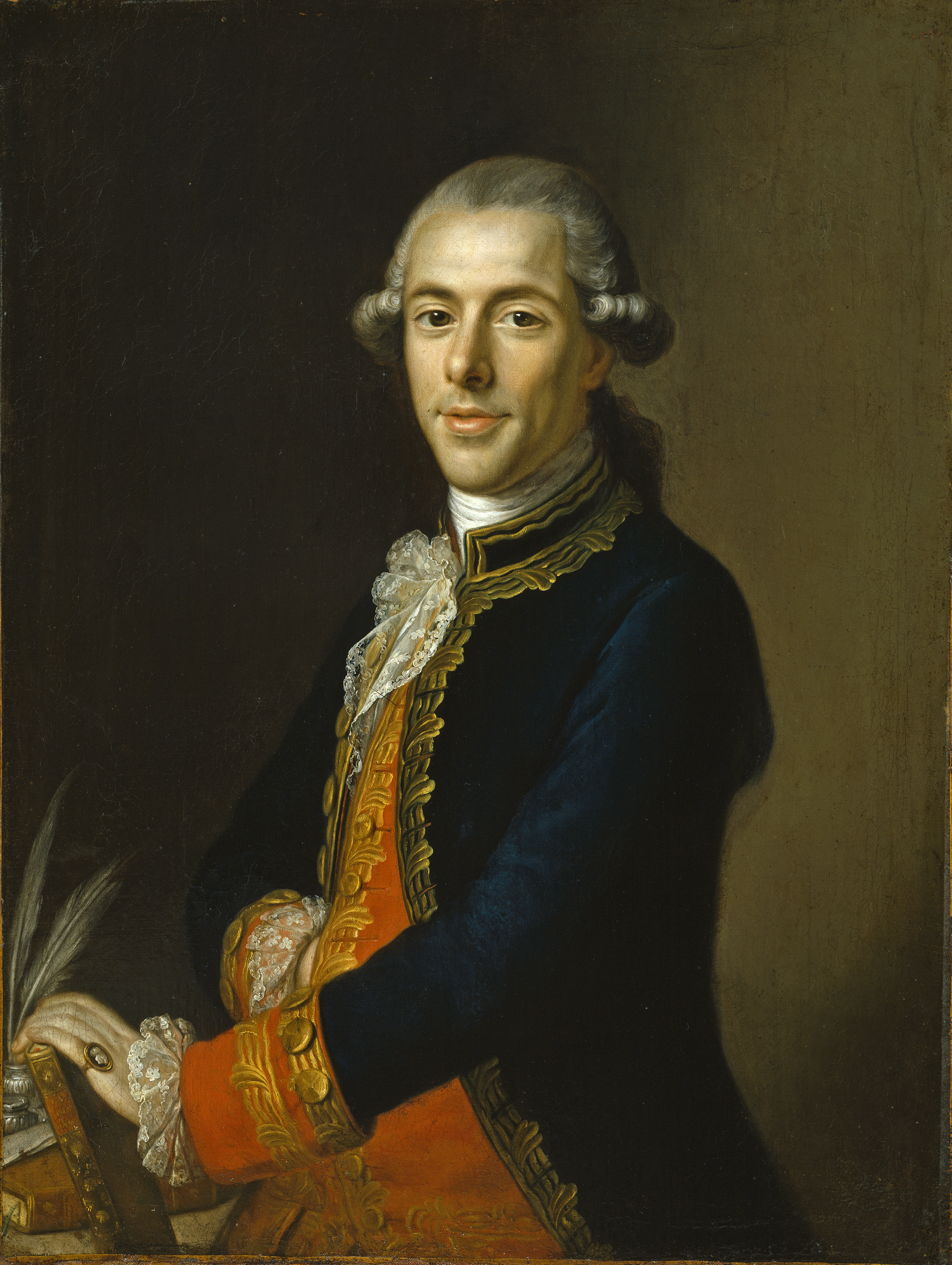
Tomás de Iriarte y Oropesa

During the 16th century, painting flourished in La Laguna and other centres including Garachico, Santa Cruz de Tenerife, La Orotava, and Puerto de la Cruz. Notable artists associated with the island include the 17th-century painters Cristóbal Hernández de Quintana and Gaspar de Quevedo, Luis de la Cruz y Ríos, Valentín Sanz, Juan Rodríguez Botas, Francisco Bonnín Guerín, and the surrealist Óscar Domínguez, who was born in La Laguna and is credited with developing the artistic technique known as decalcomania. Sculpture on Tenerife developed under the influence of the Seville school following the arrival of the architect and sculptor Martín de Andújar Cantos. Later sculptors included Blas García Ravelo, Sebastián Fernández Méndez, Lázaro González de Ocampo, José Rodríguez de la Oliva, and Fernando Estévez, a native of La Orotava whose religious images and woodcarvings remain in churches throughout the island.

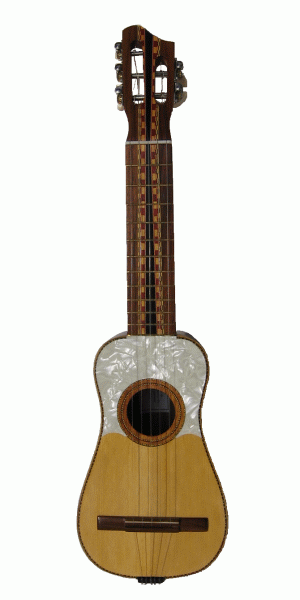
Canarian timple

=== Performing arts ===
Music forms an important part of Tenerife's cultural identity. The composer and pianist Teobaldo Power y Lugo Viña, a native of Santa Cruz de Tenerife, wrote the Cantos Canarios, whose Arrorró (Lullaby) provided the melody for the Hymn of the Canary Islands.

Traditional music remains an important expression of island culture and is characterized by instruments such as the Canarian timple, guitar, bandurria, laúd, and various percussion instruments. Tenerife is particularly associated with the song forms known as the isa, folía, tajaraste, and malagueña, which combine Guanche, Andalusian, and Latin American influences. Folkloric groups such as Los Sabandeños have played a significant role in preserving these traditions.

=== Traditional crafts and material culture ===
Traditional craftsmanship remains an important part of Tenerife's cultural heritage. Distinctive local crafts include Tenerife lace (calado canario), a form of drawn-thread embroidery, and the intricate embroidered doilies known as rosetas, particularly associated with Vilaflor. The manta esperancera is an iconic garment of Tenerife.

Woodworking and cabinetwork have also been important industries, particularly in the north of the island, where artisans produced balconies, latticework, doors, windows, and finely crafted furniture. Basketry traditionally used palm leaves, chestnut branches, and banana-fibre known locally as la badana.

Pottery on Tenerife has roots in the ceramic traditions of the Guanches, who produced hand-worked vessels without the use of a potter's wheel. These ceramics served both domestic and decorative purposes and included items such as pots, grills, bead collars, and pintaderas, ceramic stamps used to decorate other vessels.

== Architecture and historic buildings ==
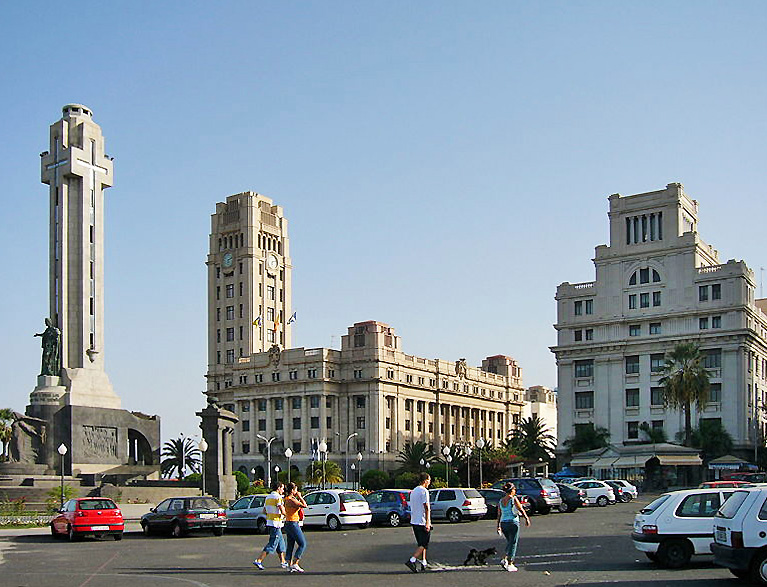
Architecture in Santa Cruz de Tenerife (Plaza de España)

Tenerife is characterized by a distinctive architectural tradition whose best-known examples range from manor houses and historic churches to modern public buildings. Traditional Canarian architecture is especially visible in the historic centres of San Cristóbal de La Laguna and La Orotava, where manor houses and more modest dwellings are distinguished by wooden balconies, interior courtyards, and the use of pino tea (pitch pine). Simple façades, wooden lattices, and shaded patios are characteristic features of many historic buildings, while interior courtyards often serve as small gardens that bring light and ventilation into the surrounding rooms.

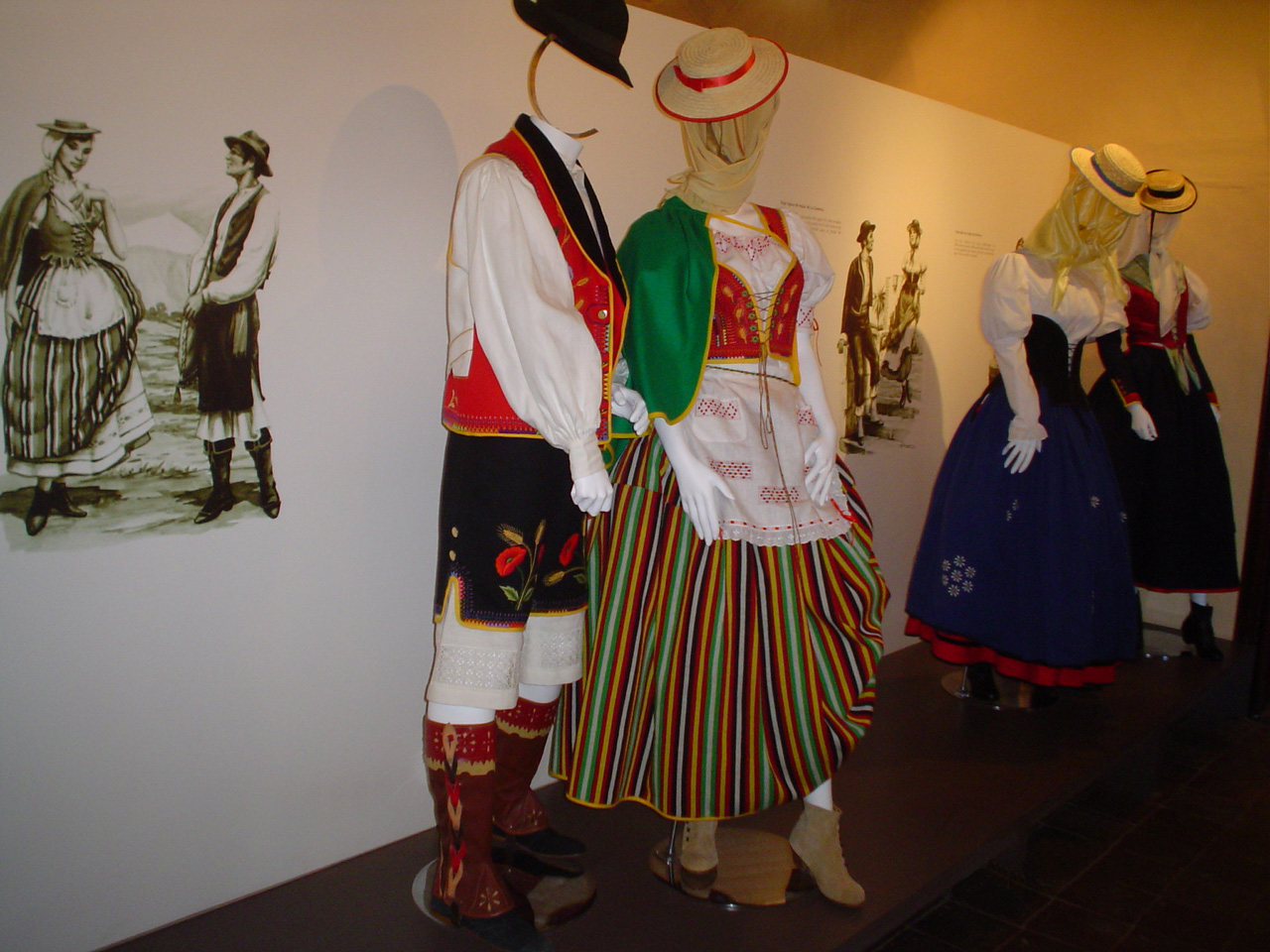
Traditional costume

The historic centres of La Laguna and La Orotava contain many of Tenerife's best-known examples of traditional architecture and have been recognized for their historical and artistic importance. In La Laguna, many streets and buildings still reflect the city's early development and preserve one of the Canary Islands' most significant historic urban landscapes. The city was designated a UNESCO World Heritage Site in 1999.

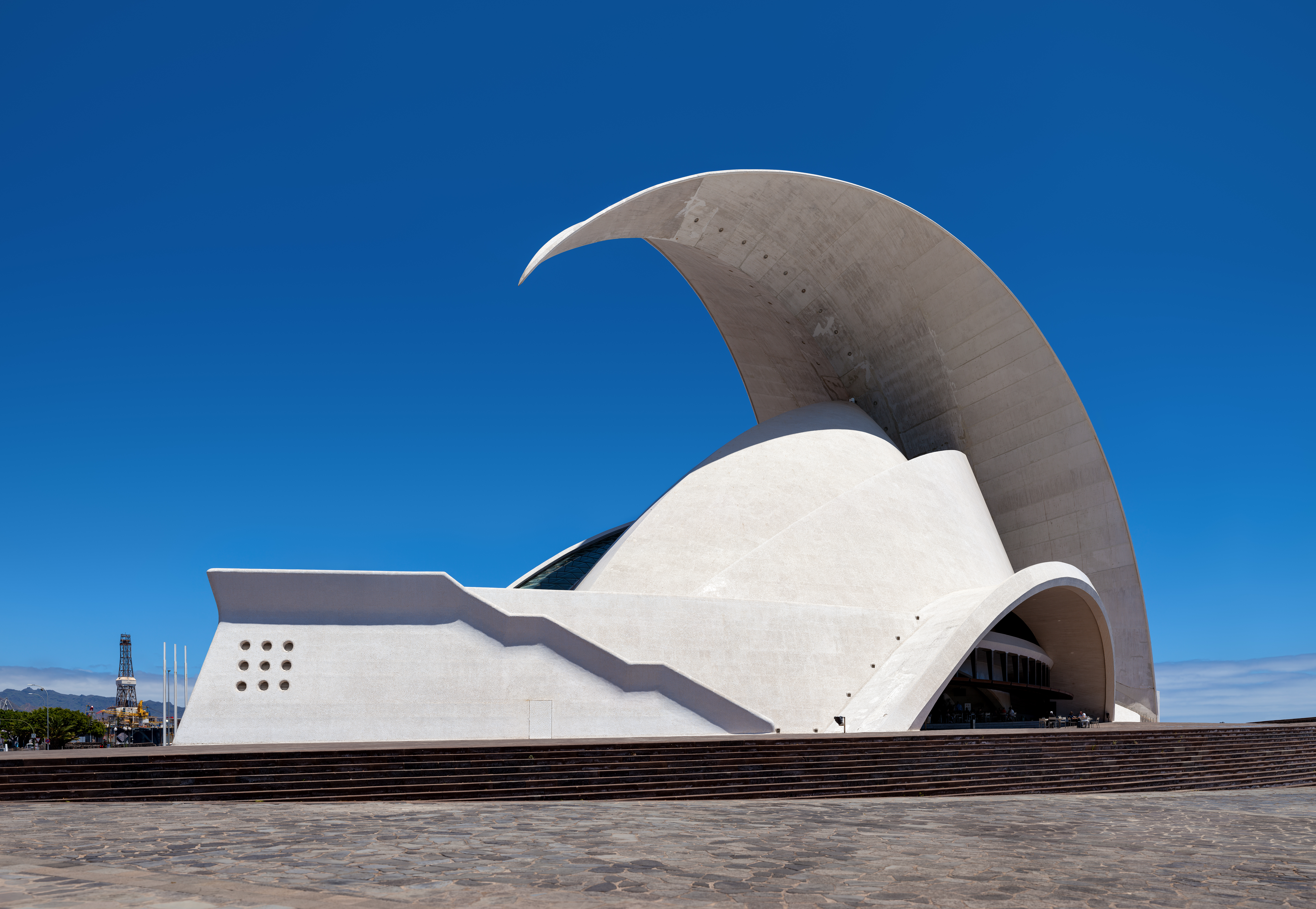
Auditorio de Tenerife, a landmark of contemporary architecture in the Canary Islands

Religious architecture forms an important part of the island's built heritage. Notable landmarks include the Basilica of Candelaria, which houses the image of the Virgin of Candelaria, patron saint of the Canary Islands; the Cathedral of La Laguna, seat of the Roman Catholic Diocese of San Cristóbal de La Laguna; the Real Santuario del Cristo de La Laguna; the Church of the Conception of La Laguna; and the Mother Parish of the Apostle Santiago (Los Realejos), traditionally regarded as the first Christian church established on Tenerife following the Castilian conquest.

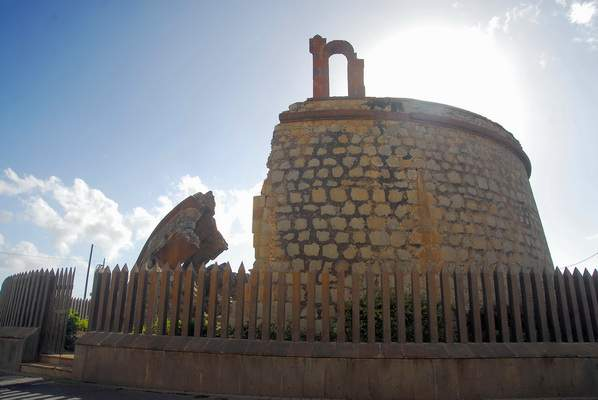
Castle of San Andrés

The island also contains numerous historic defensive structures. Among the best known is the Castle of San Andrés, a coastal fortification in San Andrés. Other military landmarks include the Castillo Negro in Santa Cruz de Tenerife.

Modern landmarks include the Auditorio de Tenerife in Santa Cruz de Tenerife, designed by Santiago Calatrava, which has been described as an architectural symbol of the Canary Islands. Other contemporary projects include the redevelopment of the Plaza de España and the Torres de Santa Cruz.

== Religious and traditional practises ==
=== Indigenous beliefs ===
The Guanches were polytheistic, with further widespread belief in an astral cult. They also had an animistic religiosity that sacralized certain places, mainly rocks and mountains. Although the Guanches worshiped many gods and ancestral spirits, among the most important were Achamán (the god of the sky and supreme creator), Chaxiraxi (the mother goddess, identified later with the Virgin of Candelaria), Magec (the god of the sun), and Guayota (the demon who is the main cause of evil). Especially significant was the cult of the dead, which practiced the mummification of corpses. In addition, small anthropomorphic and zoomorphic stone and clay figurines, typically associated with rituals, have been found on the island. Scholars believe they were used as idols, the most prominent of which is the so-called Idol of Guatimac, which is thought to represent a genius or protective spirit.

=== Religious life ===
Modern Tenerife, like the rest of Spain, is largely Catholic. Other religions and denominations have expanded on the island through tourism and immigration, including Islam, Hinduism, Buddhism, Evangelical Christianity, Judaism, and Afro-American religions. Other minority religions on the island include Chinese religions, the Baháʼí Faith, and the Church of the Guanche People. Christianity and Judaism arrived on the island with the Spanish conquest.

The Virgin of Candelaria, patron saint of the Canary Islands, represents the union of Guanche and Spanish cultures. According to tradition, the Guanches became devoted to a Black Madonna left by Christian missionaries from Lanzarote and Fuerteventura on a beach near present-day Candelaria, giving rise to legends associated with the Virgin and to the pilgrimages to Candelaria. Another Marian devotion is Our Lady of Los Remedios, patron of Tenerife and the Roman Catholic Diocese of Tenerife. There is also a significant local devotion to an image of Jesus Christ, the Christ of La Laguna, which is one of the most venerated images in the archipelago.

The headquarters of the Islamic Federation of the Canary Islands is in Tenerife; the organization was founded to unite the Muslim communities of the Canary Islands. The headquarters of the Evangelical Council of the Canary Islands is also on the island.

=== Religious figures ===
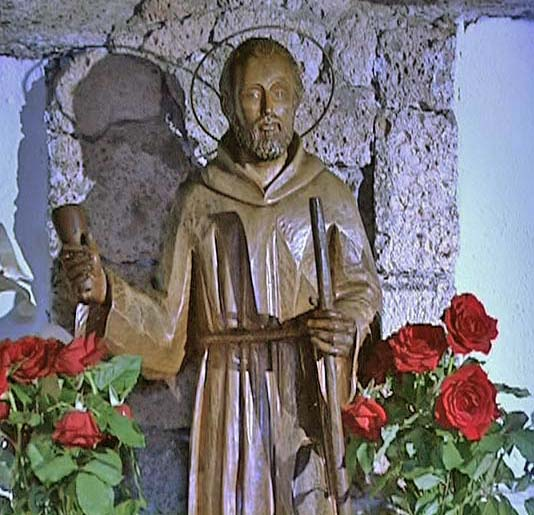
Peter of Saint Joseph de Betancur, franciscan missionary in Guatemala born in Tenerife. He was the first Canarian to be canonized by the Catholic Church. This saint is very venerated in Tenerife.

Peter of Saint Joseph Betancur was born in Vilaflor and was a missionary in Guatemala. He founded the Order of Our Lady of Bethlehem, the first religious order established in the Americas, and became the first saint of Tenerife and the Canary Islands. His principal shrine is the Cave of Santo Hermano Pedro in Granadilla de Abona, one of the most important pilgrimage sites in the Canary Islands.

José de Anchieta was born in San Cristóbal de La Laguna and became a missionary in Brazil. He is regarded as one of the founders of São Paulo and Rio de Janeiro. He too would be canonized, becoming the second native saint of the island and the archipelago.

Mary of Jesus de León y Delgado was a mystic nun known for her holiness and venerated throughout the Canary Islands. Her body is preserved in the Convent of Santa Catalina de Siena in San Cristóbal de La Laguna.

=== Festivals and traditions ===
==== Carnival of Santa Cruz ====
The Carnival of Santa Cruz de Tenerife is one of Tenerife's most important festivals and is popular at both national and international levels. It has been declared a Festival of International Tourist Interest. Although carnival celebrations are held in many locations in the north and south of Tenerife, the largest take place in Santa Cruz de Tenerife. Events include contests, street musician groups known as murgas, minstrel groups known as rondallas, masquerade groups known as comparsas, and other associations. After the Carnival Queen is elected, the street carnival begins in central Santa Cruz and lasts for ten days.

==== Romerías ====
The pilgrimages known as romerías are among the most traditional and widespread religious festivals in Tenerife. They combine Christian and non-Christian elements and are celebrated with wagons, floats, plowing teams, livestock, local dances, local dishes, folkloric activities, local arts and crafts, local sports, and traditional Tenerife dress known as trajes de mago. Their origins are associated with celebrations held by the island's wealthier classes in honour of patron saints, to whom they attributed good harvests, fertile lands, plentiful rainfall, cures for illness, and the end of epidemics. Important examples include the festivals of Saint Mark in Tegueste, Saint Isidore the Laborer in Los Realejos, Saint Isidore the Laborer and Saint Mary of the Head in La Orotava, the Romería Regional de San Benito Abad in San Cristóbal de La Laguna, the Virgin of Candelaria in Candelaria, Saint Roch in Garachico, Saint Augustine in Arafo, and the Romería del Socorro in Güímar.

==== Corpus Christi ====
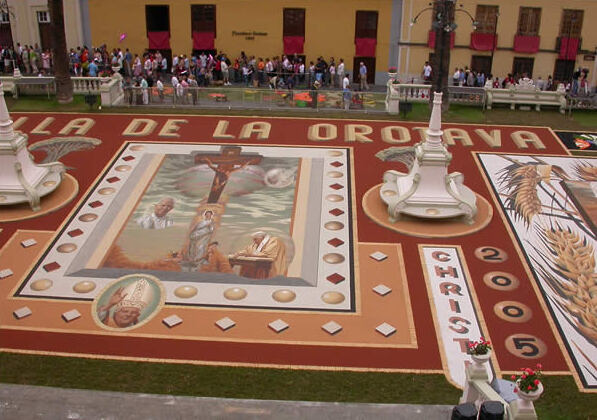
Soil Tapestry in the Plaza del Ayuntamiento (Town Square) in La Orotava

The festival of Corpus Christi is traditionally celebrated in Tenerife with floral carpets laid in the streets. The celebrations in La Orotava are especially notable, particularly the large carpet or tapestry made from different-coloured volcanic soils in the Plaza del Ayuntamiento. The soils are taken from Teide National Park and returned after the celebration to preserve the park. The Corpus Christi celebration in La Orotava has been declared of Important Cultural Interest among the official Traditional Activities of the Island.

==== Easter ====
Easter is celebrated across Tenerife and remains one of the celebrations that define Tenerifan culture. It is especially notable in San Cristóbal de La Laguna, La Orotava, and Los Realejos, where processions take place on Maundy Thursday, Good Friday, and Easter Sunday. Holy Week in San Cristóbal de La Laguna is the largest in the Canary Islands.

== Transportation ==
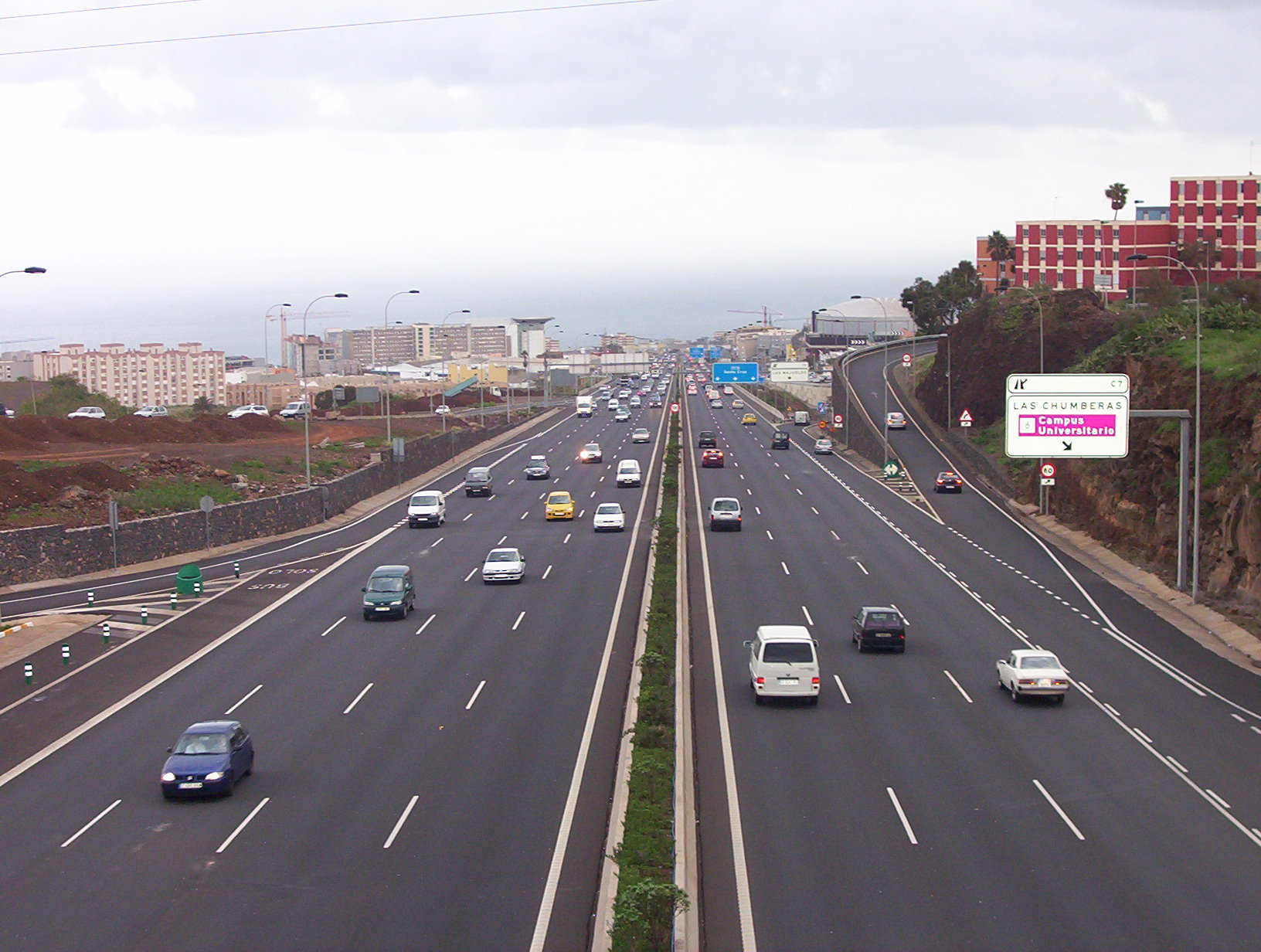
TF5 motorway approaching Santa Cruz

Tenerife, one of the Canary Islands of Spain in the Atlantic Ocean, has a transportation network that connects communities across the island and links it with the other Canary Islands, mainland Spain, and destinations throughout Europe. Roads are the principal means of travel, supplemented by public buses, a tram system, airports, and passenger ports.

=== Land transport ===
==== Buses ====
Public buses operate throughout Tenerife and are managed by TITSA, the island's public transport company. Known locally as guaguas, the buses connect cities, towns, villages, and many rural communities. Services reach destinations including the Anaga Mountains in northeastern Tenerife, Mount Teide in the island's interior, and the Teno Massif in the northwest. Passengers can use the TenMas contactless smart card for discounted fares on both buses and trams.

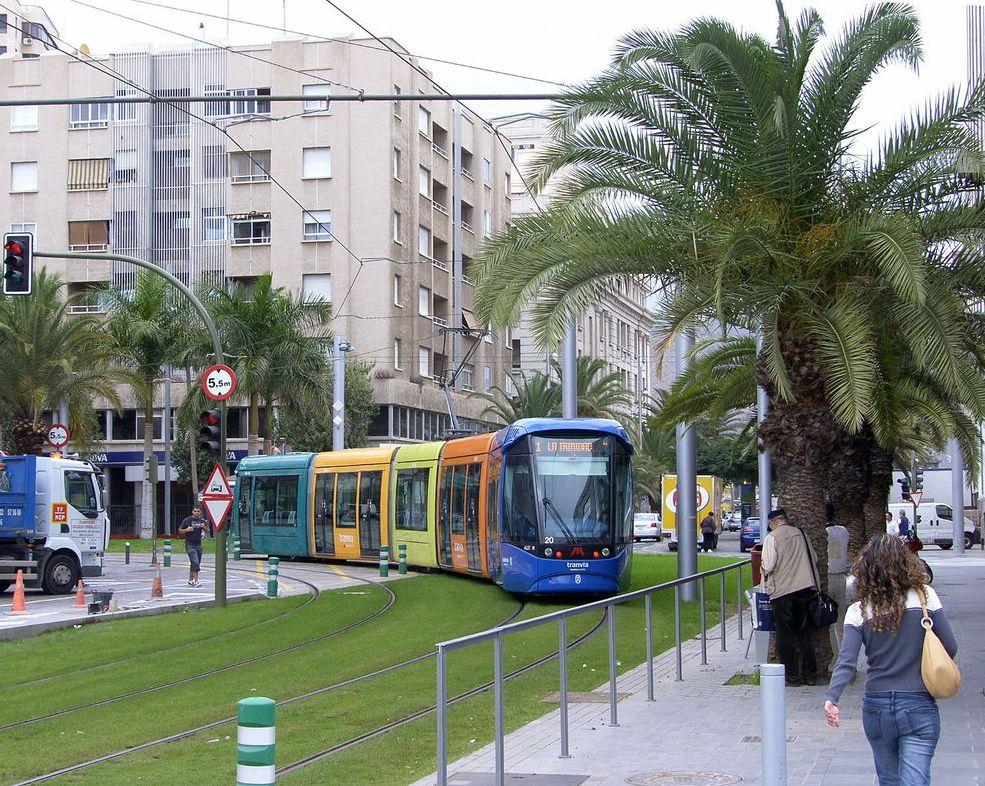
Tramway servicing between Santa Cruz and La Laguna

==== Roads ====
Most travel on Tenerife takes place by road. The island's transportation network is centred on two major motorways: the TF-1 (Autopista del Sur), which serves southern Tenerife, and the TF-5 (Autopista del Norte), which serves northern Tenerife. Together they connect the Santa Cruz de Tenerife–San Cristóbal de La Laguna metropolitan area with the island's principal towns, resorts, and population centres. A gap remains in the motorway network between Adeje on the southwest coast and Icod de los Vinos on the northwest coast.

==== Tram ====
The Tenerife Tram serves the metropolitan area formed by Santa Cruz de Tenerife, the island's capital, and nearby San Cristóbal de La Laguna. Opened in 2007, the system provides an important connection between the island's two largest urban centres. A second line opened in 2009.

=== Air transport ===
Tenerife North Airport

Tenerife is served by two airports: Tenerife North Airport, located near the capital region, and Tenerife South Airport, the island's principal international gateway. Together they handle the largest volume of passenger traffic in the Canary Islands. Tenerife North Airport primarily serves domestic and inter-island routes, while Tenerife South Airport handles most international and tourist traffic.

=== Maritime transport ===
As an island, Tenerife also depends heavily on sea transport. Its principal ports are the Port of Los Cristianos in southern Tenerife and the Port of Santa Cruz de Tenerife on the island's northeastern coast. These facilities handle passenger, commercial, and ferry traffic, linking Tenerife with the other Canary Islands and with mainland Spain. Passenger services also connect Tenerife with the port of Cádiz on the Spanish mainland. The Port of Santa Cruz is the largest fishing port in the Canary Islands. Additional facilities include the Port of Granadilla, which opened in 2017, while proposals have been made for a new port at Fonsalía.

== Sports ==
On the island of Tenerife, a wide range of sports are practised, both outdoors and indoors, across the various facilities available throughout the island. The sports are numerous – diving, rock climbing, walking, cycling, sailing, golf, surfing, go-karting, paragliding – the all-year-round warm weather makes it ideal for a wide variety of outdoor sports. There are also many indoor sporting facilities, including a fully equipped 'Tenerife Top Training' centre in Adeje on the South of the Island. Its most well-known sports team is football club CD Tenerife based in Santa Cruz. The club has spent time in the Spanish top flight but has, in recent decades, primarily played in the second division of Spanish football. Also worth mentioning is the ultramarathon CajaMar Tenerife Bluetrail, the highest race in Spain and second in Europe, with the participation of several countries and great international repercussions.

== Gastronomy ==
=== Agricultural products ===
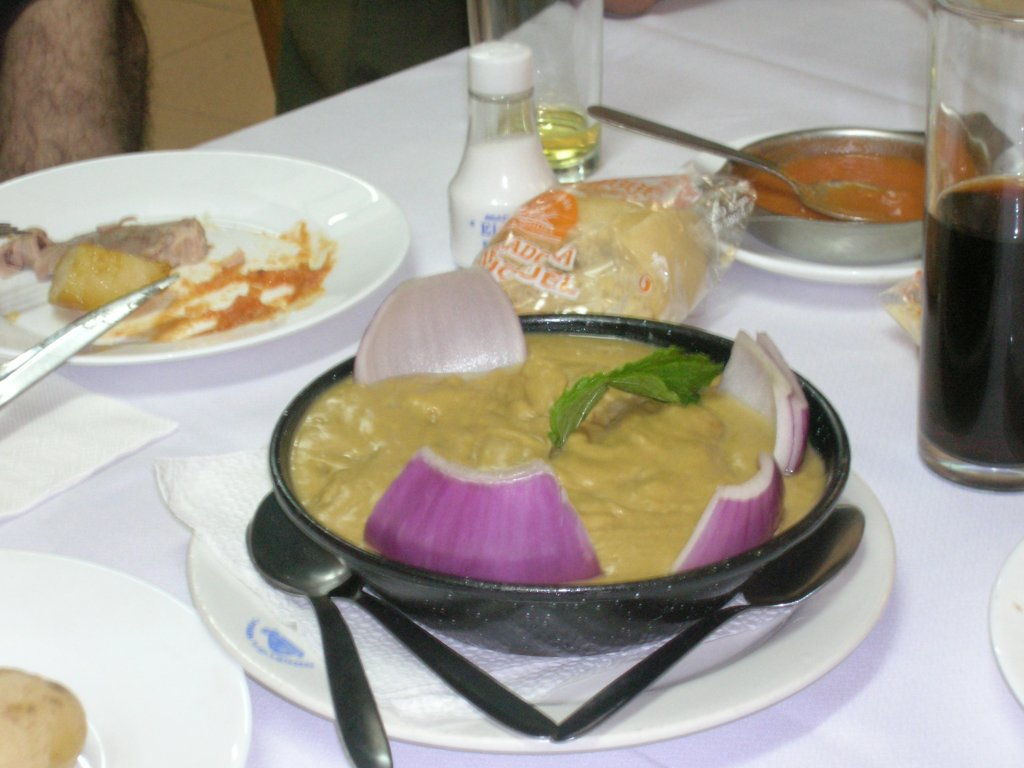
Gofio escaldado

Tenerife has a long tradition of producing cheese, wine and gofio. Following the Castilian conquest of the Canary Islands, cheese production became one of the island's earliest commercial activities and was even used as a medium of exchange. Traditional cheesemaking developed in areas such as Arico, La Orotava and the Teno region. Goat cheese remains the principal variety, although cheeses are also produced from sheep's and cow's milk. Tenerife's cheeses have received international recognition for their quality and distinctive sweetness.

Gofio, a flour made from roasted and ground cereals, has been a staple food on Tenerife since before the Spanish conquest and was an important part of the diet of the Guanches. Traditionally made from wheat, chickpeas or a mixture of grains, it is eaten as a main dish, served with soups and stews, or incorporated into desserts.

Viticulture has played an important role in Tenerife's economy since the conquest. During the 16th and 17th centuries, malvasía wine was among the island's most important exports and was shipped throughout Europe and the Americas. Today, Tenerife contains five principal wine-growing regions: Abona, Valle de Güímar, Valle de La Orotava, Tacoronte-Acentejo and Ycoden-Daute-Isora.

=== Traditional dishes ===
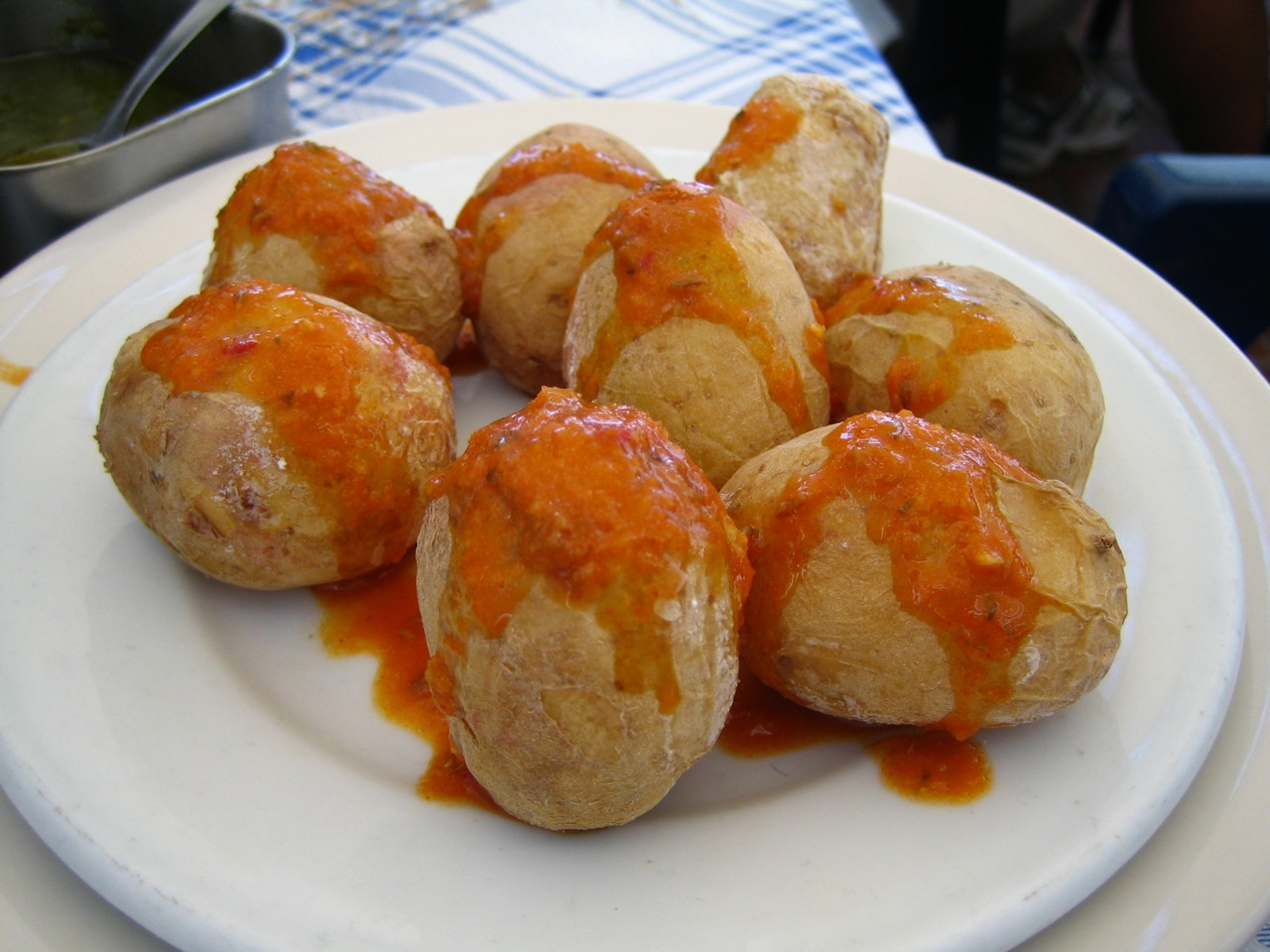
Canarian wrinkly potatoes, with red mojo

As an island, Tenerife has a cuisine strongly based on fish and seafood. Commonly consumed species include vieja, sea bream, grouper, tuna, sardines and jack mackerel. Fish is often boiled, baked in salt (a la sal) or prepared a la espalda, and is typically served with mojo sauce and papas arrugadas (wrinkled potatoes).

Meat dishes include carne de fiesta, a marinated pork dish traditionally prepared for local celebrations, as well as rabbit in salmorejo, goat, beef, pork and poultry.

Papas arrugadas are among the island's best-known dishes. The potatoes are boiled in heavily salted water until a characteristic salty crust forms on the skin. They are commonly served with mojo, the characteristic sauce of the Canary Islands. The word mojo is believed to be of Portuguese origin. The most common varieties are mojo verde and the spicier mojo rojo.

=== Sweets and desserts ===
Traditional desserts associated with Tenerife include bienmesabe, leche asada, Príncipe Alberto, frangollo, huevos moles and quesillo.

=== Food culture ===
Traditional cuisine is served in establishments known as guachinches, which are closely associated with local wine production. Their season traditionally begins on San Andrés Day (30 November), when the new wine harvest is first served.

The celebration, known as the Festival de Vino Joven, is traditionally accompanied by roasted chestnuts and grilled sardines. The guachinche season generally lasts from late autumn until early spring.

== In popular culture ==
=== Place names ===
- The Brisbane suburb of Teneriffe in Brisbane, Australia, was named by early landowner James Gibbon because the area reminded him of Mount Teide.
- Other settlements whose names derive from Tenerife include San Carlos de Tenerife in the Dominican Republic and Tenerife, Magdalena in Colombia.

=== Film and television ===
Tenerife has served as a filming location for numerous productions, including:

- 1898, Our Last Men in the Philippines, a film directed by Salvador Calvo, with scenes filmed on the island.
- Clash of the Titans, a film directed by Louis Leterrier, filmed in locations including Teide National Park, Icod de los Vinos, Buenavista del Norte and the Chío pine forests.
- Den of Thieves 2: Pantera, a film directed by Christian Gudegast, was filmed largely in Santa Cruz de Tenerife.
- Jason Bourne, a film directed by Paul Greengrass, was filmed in Santa Cruz de Tenerife, parts of which were adapted to resemble Athens and Piraeus.
- One Million Years B.C., a film directed by Don Chaffey, was filmed in Teide National Park.
- Rambo: Last Blood, a film directed by Adrian Grunberg, was filmed in locations across the island, including Santa Cruz de Tenerife, San Cristóbal de La Laguna, Puerto de la Cruz, Santa Úrsula, Arico and areas around Teide National Park.
- Wrath of the Titans, a film directed by Jonathan Liebesman, was filmed largely in Teide National Park.

=== Music ===
Music associated with Tenerife includes:

- "Do It for Your Lover", a song by Spanish singer Manel Navarro, whose music video was filmed on the island.
- "The Island – Pt. 1 Dawn", a song by Australian electronic music group Pendulum, whose music video was filmed in Teide National Park.
- "Tie Your Mother Down", a song by English musician Brian May, who wrote it while studying astronomical phenomena at Izaña in Teide National Park.
- "Tenerife Sea", a song by English singer-songwriter Ed Sheeran, whose title and lyrics reference the island.
- "Universo", a song by Spanish singer Blas Cantó, whose music video was filmed on Tenerife and Lanzarote.

=== Video games ===
- Asphalt 8: Airborne includes four race tracks based on Tenerife.
- The fictional island of Kolgujev in Operation Flashpoint: Cold War Crisis was based on Tenerife.

=== Literature ===
Literary works featuring Tenerife include:

- Atentado by Spanish writer Mariano Gambín.
- "The Companion" and "The Man from the Sea" by English writer Agatha Christie.
- El Sarcófago de las tres llaves by Spanish writer Pompeyo Reina Moreno.
- La cueva de las mil momias by Spanish writer Alberto Vázquez-Figueroa.
- Thieves' Picnic by English author Leslie Charteris.

== International relations ==
Tenerife is twinned with:

- Miami-Dade, United States
- Santo Domingo, Dominican Republic

== See also ==
- Bichon Tenerife
- List of free economic zones § Spain
- List of volcanoes in Spain
- María del Carmen Betancourt y Molina
- Observatorio del Teide
