= Tinerfe =

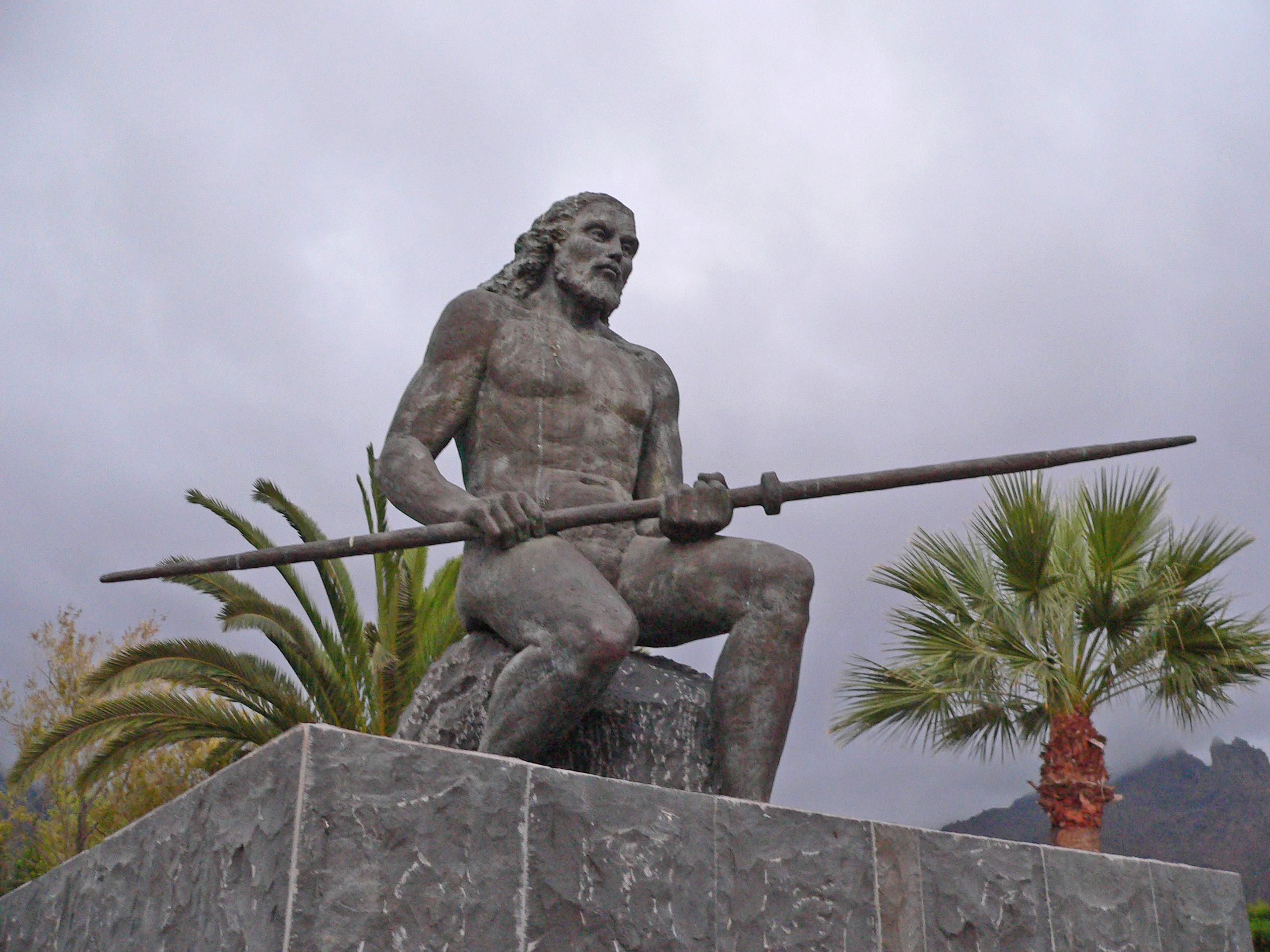
Statue of Tinerfe (Adeje, Tenerife)

Tinerfe "the Great" is a legendary hero who was a guanche mencey (aboriginal king) of the island of Tenerife (Canary Islands, Spain). It is estimated that he lived at the end of the 14th century.

He was the son of mencey Sunta, who ruled the island in the days before the conquest of the Canary Islands by Castile. Tinerfe the Great lived in Adeje (like all his predecessors), approximately a hundred years before the conquest of 1494.

Upon Tinerfe's death, his sons divided the island into nine kingdoms. At the time of the conquest the kings of these kingdoms were:

- Acaimo or Acaymo (mencey (king) of Menceyato de Tacoronte).
- Adjona: (mencey (king) of Menceyato de Abona).
- Añaterve: (mencey (king) of Menceyato de Güímar).
- Bencomo: (mencey (king) of Menceyato de Taoro).
- Beneharo: (mencey (king) of Menceyato de Anaga).
- Pelicar: (mencey (king) of Menceyato de Icode).
- Pelinor: (mencey (king) of Menceyato de Adeje).
- Romen: (mencey (king) of Menceyato de Daute).
- Tegueste: (mencey (king) of Menceyato de Tegueste).

== In the toponymy of the island ==
The 17th-century historians Juan Núñez de la Peña and Tomás Arias Marín de Cubas, among others, state that the name of the island of Tenerife could come from Tinerfe.

== Bibliography ==
- Abreu y Galindo, J. de, Historia de la conquista de las siete islas de Canarias, en A. Cioranescu (ed) Goya ediciones, Tenerife, 1977 ISBN 84-400-3645-0.
- Arias Marín de Cubas, T. Historia de las siete islas de Canaria, edición de Ángel de Juan Casañas y María Régulo Rodríguez; proemio de Juan Régulo Pérez; notas arqueológicas de Julio Cuenca Sanabría. Real Sociedad Económica de Amigos del País, Las Palmas de Gran Canaria, 1986 ISBN 84-398-7275-5
- Bethencourt Alfonso, J. Historia del pueblo guanche: Tomo II. Etnografía y organización socio-política, Francisco Lemus Ed. La Laguna, 1991 ISBN 84-87973-05-1.
- Espinosa, Fray A. de, Historia de Nuestra Señora de Candelaria, en A. Cioranescu (ed) Goya ediciones, santa Cruz de Tenerife, 1967 ISBN 84-400-3645-0.
- Torriani, L. Descripción e historia del reino de las Islas Canarias, en A. Cioranescu (ed) Goya ediciones, Santa Cruz de Tenerife, 1978 ISBN 84-7181-336-X.
- Viana, A. La Conquista de Tenerife, en A. Cioranescu (ed) Aula de Cultura de Tenerife, Cabildo Insular, 1968-1971.
