= Romen (mencey) =

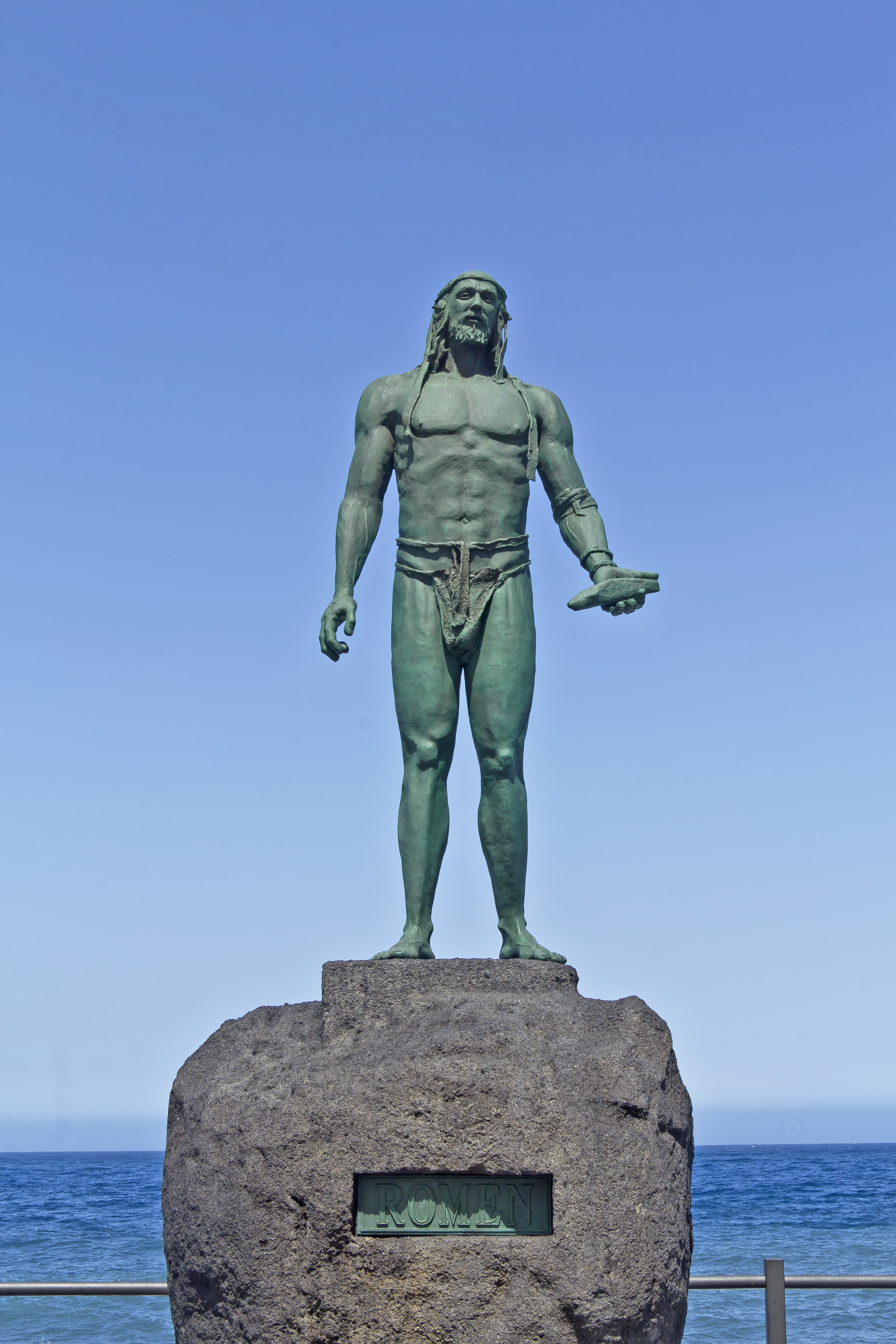
- Statue of Romen in Plaza de la Patrona de Canarias, Candelaria, Tenerife.
- Reign: 15th century
- Dynasty: Menceyato de Daute

Romen was a Guanche mencey king of Menceyato de Daute in times of the conquest of Tenerife in the fifteenth century.

Romen is remembered as one of the Guanche leaders who resisted the Spanish conquest of Tenerife.

== Reign ==
Upon arrival of Alonso Fernández de Lugo in 1494, Romen allied with Bencomo mencey against the Spanish invasion, and its menceyato one side of war. However, some historians based in Viana, refer to ally with Bencomo refused for not wanting to submit to the king of Taoro dirigiese the rest in the race. For its part, he indicates that Viera y Clavijo, Romen would not ally with Bencomo believing their domains of the danger of distant conquerors. Finally, after successive defeats and ordered major Guanche Kings (Bencomo, Tinguaro and Bentor), Romen gave his territory in the spring of 1496 in the act known as Paz de Los Realejos. After the surrender, Romen was brought to court to be presented to the Catholic Monarchs.

His end is unknown, although having belonged to a band of war the possibility he was reduced to slavery, it also being possible outside the mencey given to the Republic of Venice for the kings. Other authors believe that, although belonging to a faction of war, may well be released, under supervision and away from the island.
