= Bentor =

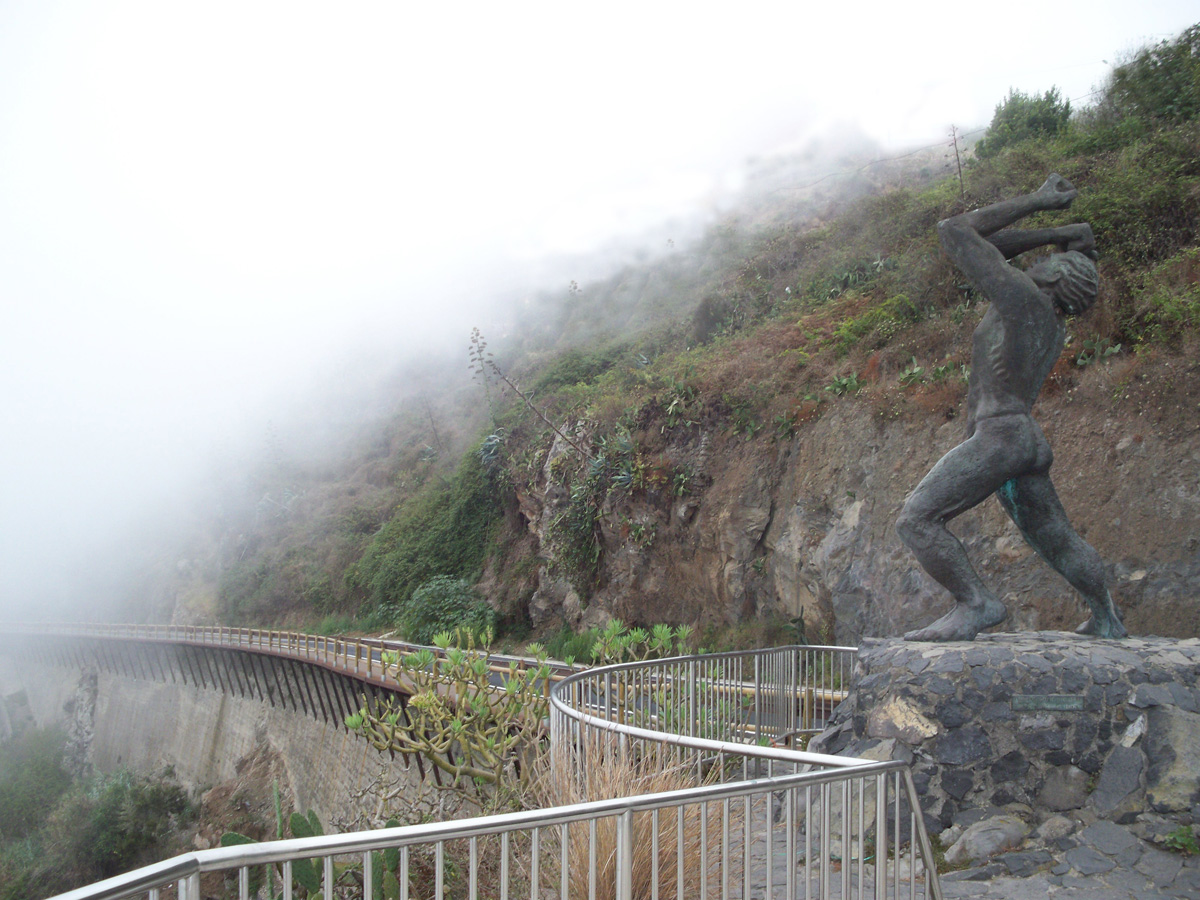
- Statue of Bentor on Tenerife

Mencey of Taoro
- Reign: November 1494 – February 1495
- Predecessor: Bencomo
- Successor: Post abolished
- Born: circa 1463
- Died: February 1495 (aged 31–32); Taoro
Names
- Bentor; Also called: Ventor; Bentore; Benytomo; Bentorey
- Father: Adjona (most likely)
- Mother: Hanagua (possibly)
- Religion: Guanche religion

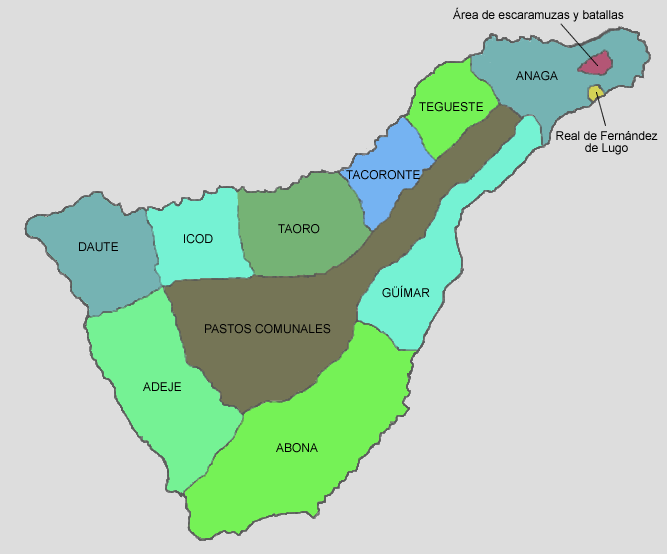
The nine menceyatos before the Spanish conquest of Tenerife.

Bentor (c. 1463 – February 1495), sometimes also called Ventor, Bentore, Benytomo, or Bentorey, was the last mencey or king of Taoro from November 1494 until his suicide in February 1495. A native Guanche prince in the Canary Islands during the second half of the 15th century, Bentor was the eldest grandson (in some sources, son) of Bencomo, the penultimate mencey (or king) of Taoro. Taoro was one of nine menceyatos, or kingdoms, on the island of Tenerife in the Canary Islands before the Spanish conquest of the islands. Bentor's mother was probably named Hañagua, although this is unclear. He succeeded his grandfather as mencey upon his father's death in November 1494, and led the kingdom until his own death by suicide four months later, in February 1495. Bentor had five siblings: one sister (Dácil) and four brothers (Ruiman, Rosalva, Chachiñama, and Tiñate).

== Biography ==
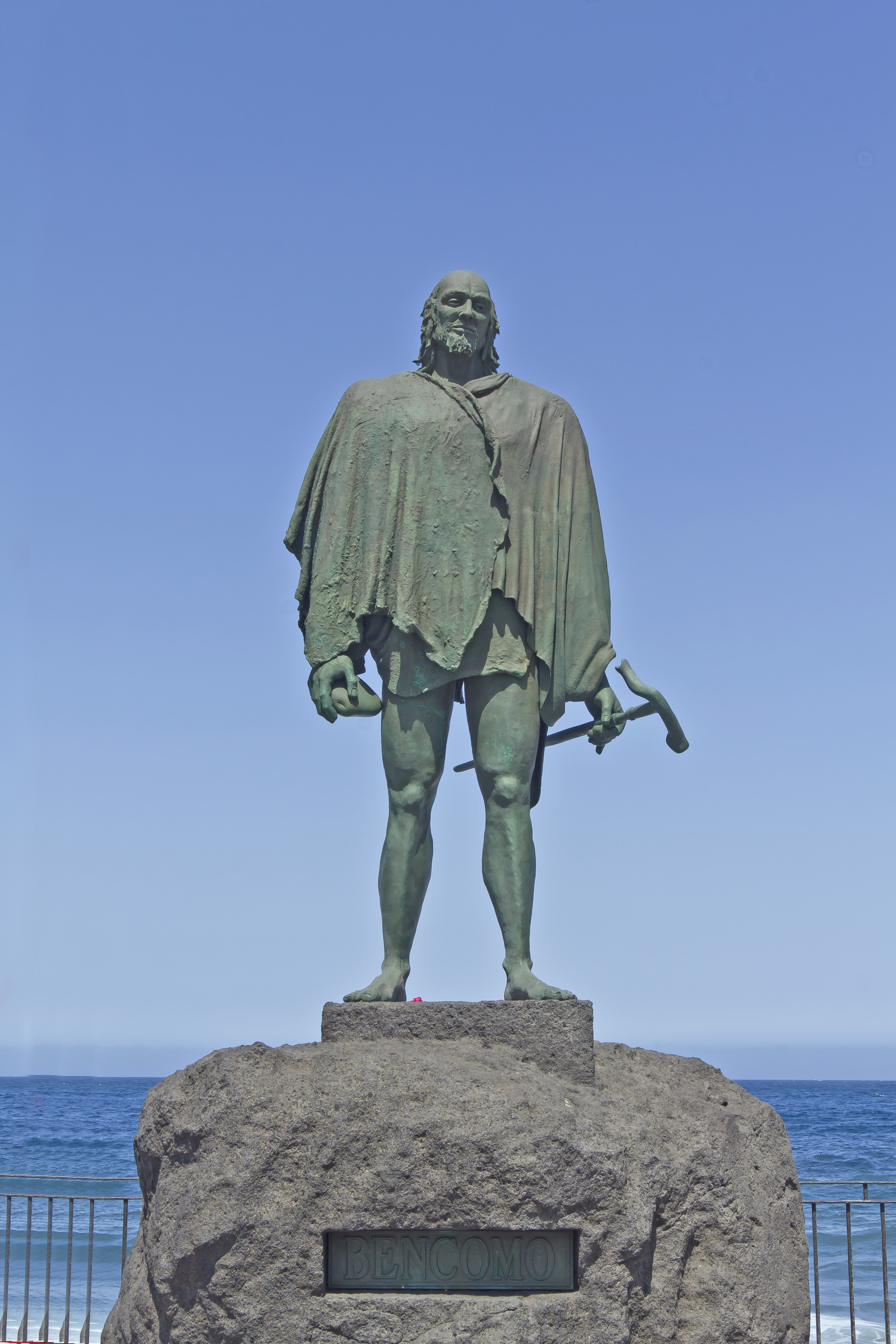
A statue of Taoro mencey Bencomo, the father of Bentor.

Bentor was born in about 1463, in Tenerife to Adjona. Bentor, then the Crown Prince, participated in many battles against the invading Spanish in 1495 alongside his father Bencomo, Mencey of Taoro. Bencomo was killed during the Battle of Aguere in November 1495, and Bentor, being the eldest son, was chosen as his successor. His uncles, Tinguaro and Adjona, may also have participated in the battle, however, Adjona, unlike Tinguaro, did not perish, and lived on until 1507. Shortly after the Battle of Aguere, Alonso Fernandez de Lugo sent Fernando Guanarteme to negotiate with Bentor, but he refused to hand over the territory.

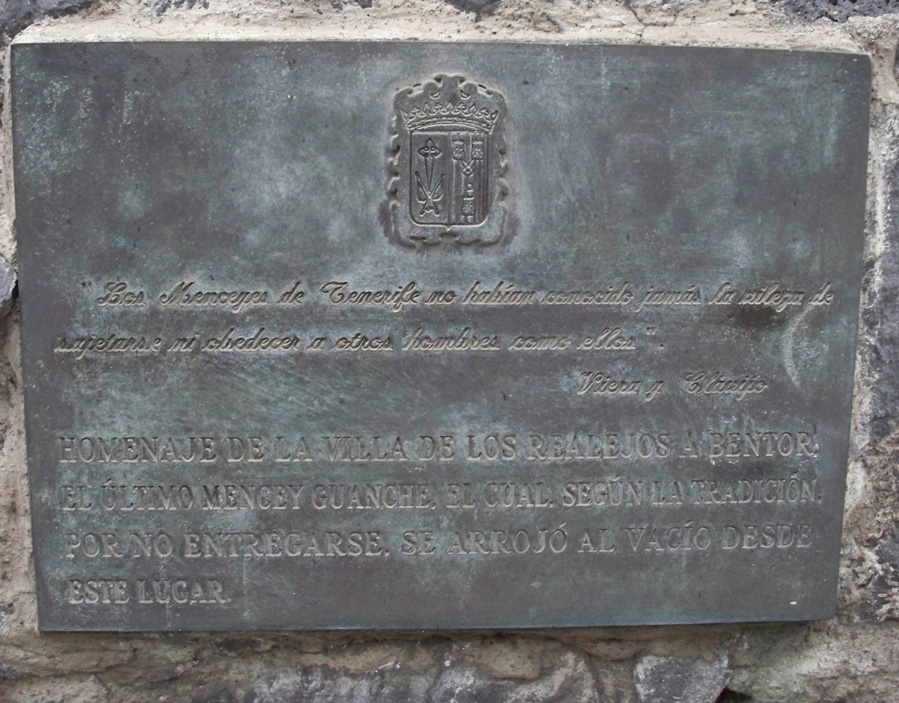
Plaque in honor of Bentor on Tenerife. Translated from Spanish, the bottom part reads: "A tribute to the town of Los Realejos, Bentor, the last Guanche mencey, which, according to tradition by not surrendering, threw himself from this place".

=== Death and legacy ===
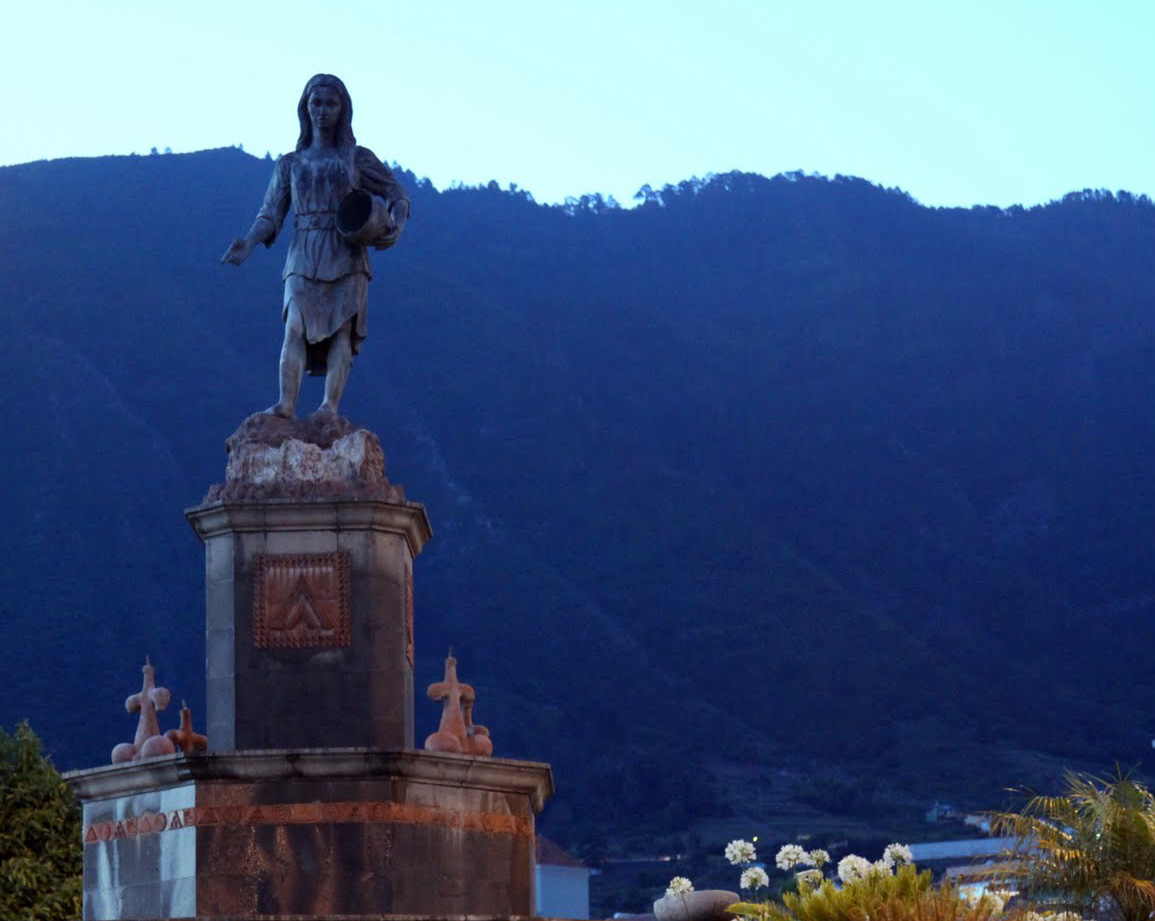
Dácil, sister of Bentor famous for marrying a conqueror of Tenerife.

Following the disastrous Second Battle of Acentejo which occurred in December 1494, the Guanche forces were severely decimated. The forces took refuge on the slope of Mount Tigaiga after the battle. It was at Tigaiga that Bentor committed suicide, in February 1495, by jumping off of the hill and tumbling down the mountainside (it was seen as a way to keep one's honor instead of surrendering). As a consequence, the Guanche resistance completely collapsed and the remaining menceys surrendered in the Peace of Los Realejos. The Canary Islands are now a Spanish autonomous community.

The Hotel Rural Bentor on the island of Tenerife is named after him.

He is actor and musician Anthony Ramos's 16th great grandfather

== See also ==
- Conquest of the Canary Islands
- Bencomo
- Guanche language
- Canary Islands
- Macaronesia
