= Maninidra =

Spanish Guanche

Maninidra was a Guanche from Gran Canaria. He was the brother of the Guanarteme (king) Tenesor Semidan, later known as Fernando Guanarteme. Maninidra was the mastermind and executor of the destruction of the Spanish fort at Gando. Later he was one of the Canarian leaders who participated in the Battle of Guiniguada, together with Adargoma and Doramas, against the Spanish invaders.

After the pact between Fernando Guanarteme and the Catholic Monarchs, he became an ally of the Spaniards and assisted them in their conquest of the islands of La Palma and Tenerife during the late 15th century. He aided Castilians during the First Battle of Acentejo, Battle of Aguere, and Second Battle of Acentejo (1495), on the island of Tenerife and died in the early 16th century during the campaigns of Alonso Fernández de Lugo in North Africa.
