= Battle of Acentejo =

Battle of Acentejo may refer to two battles fought on Tenerife:

- First Battle of Acentejo (May 1494), a Spanish defeat
- Second Battle of Acentejo (December 1495), a Spanish victory
