= Guajara (legendary Guanche woman) =

Figure in the Antigüedades de las Islas Afortunadas

Guajara or Guaxara are the names of an alleged Guanche woman, who was a character in the epic poem Antigüedades de las Islas Afortunadas of Antonio de Viana, Conquista de Tenerife.

== Biography ==
Guajara is the lover of Tinguaro, the brother of the king of Mencey Bencomo, and one of the friends of Dácil. Menecy Bencomo betrays Guajara.

The Mencey Beneharo promises his brother Tinguaro the hand of his daughter, Guacimara, and the legacy of his reign if Tinguaro is victorious in the battle against the Spaniards. Guajara is jealous of Tinguaro's interest in Guacimara and manipulates Ruymán, Tinguaro 's nephew and Guacimara's lover, to avoid the promised marriage. The marriage proceeds and Guajara commits suicide by jumping into a void.

According to the medical historian, Juan Bethencourt Alfonso, Guajara and Tinguaro had five children.
