= La Victoria de Acentejo =

- Municipality
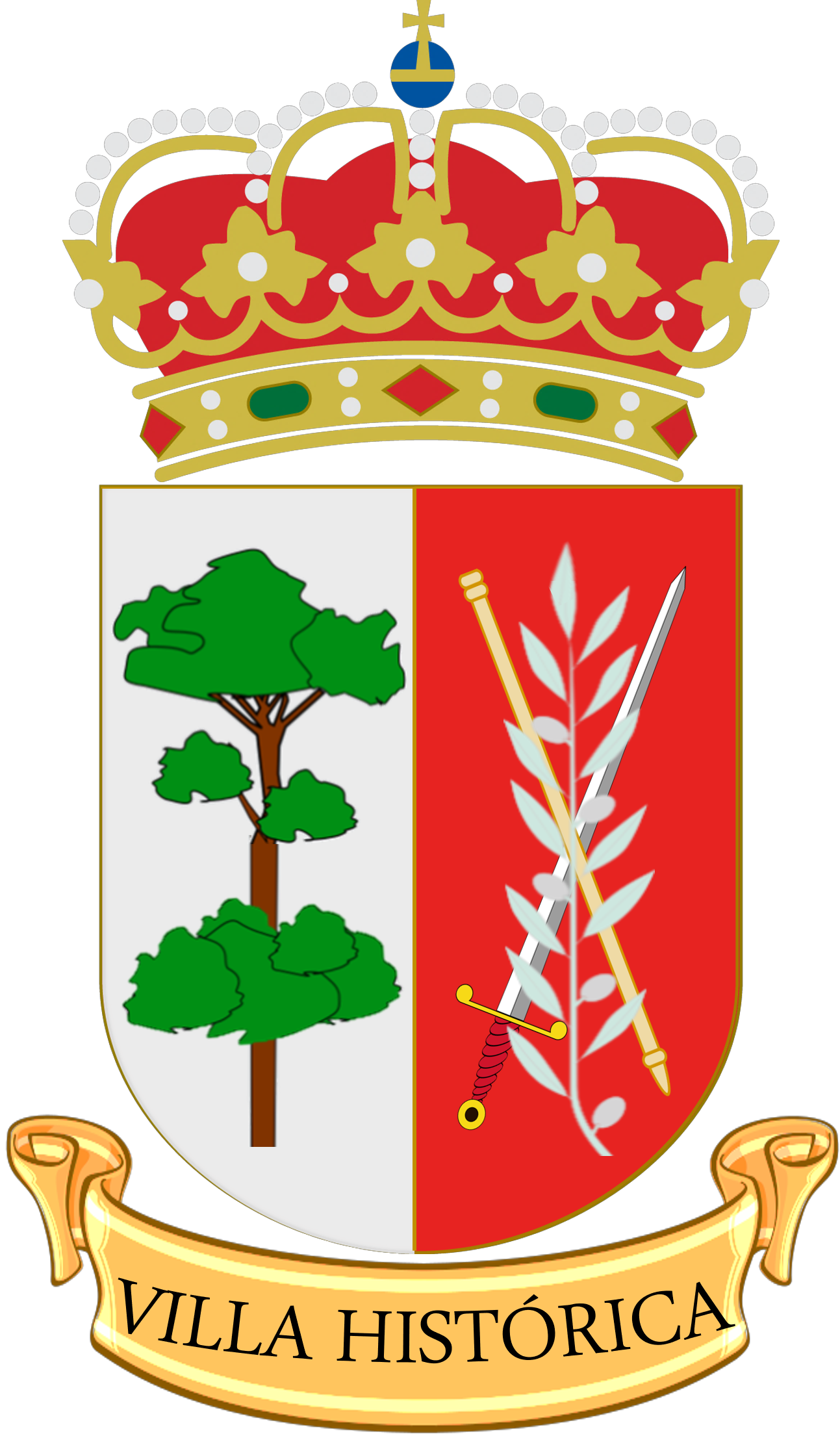
- Flag Coat of arms

- Municipal location in Tenerife

- Location in Province of Santa Cruz de Tenerife La Victoria de Acentejo (Canary Islands) La Victoria de Acentejo (Spain, Canary Islands)
- Coordinates: 28°26′N 16°28′W
- Country: Spain
- Autonomous Region: Canary Islands
- Province: Santa Cruz de Tenerife
- Island: Tenerife

Government
  - Mayor: José Fermín Correa Martín (Partido Popular)

Area
  - Total: 18.36 km^{2} (7.09 sq mi)

Population (2025-01-01)
  - Total: 9,448
  - Density: 514.6/km^{2} (1,333/sq mi)
- Time zone: UTC+0 (GMT)
- Climate: Csa
- Website: www.lavictoriadeacentejo.es

La Victoria de Acentejo is a town and a municipality in the northern part of the island Tenerife, Canary Islands, Spain. It is located near the north coast, 2 km southwest of La Matanza de Acentejo, 7 km northeast of La Orotava and 22 km west of the island capital Santa Cruz de Tenerife. The TF-5 motorway passes through the municipality. The population is 9,069 (2013) and the area is 18.36 km^{2}.

== History ==
Before the arrival of the Spaniards, La Acentejo was part of the menceyato (kingdom) of Taoro. The first and the second battles of Acentejo took place in 1494. The Spanish under Alonso Fernández de Lugo suffered a terrible defeat at this first battle, at the place now called La Matanza de Acentejo ("The Slaughter"). The second battle resulted in a victory for the Spaniards, after which the town of La Victoria de Acentejo was founded.

== See also ==
- List of municipalities in Santa Cruz de Tenerife
