= First Battle of Acentejo =

15th century battle in Spain

- Part of the Spanish Conquest of the Canary Islands
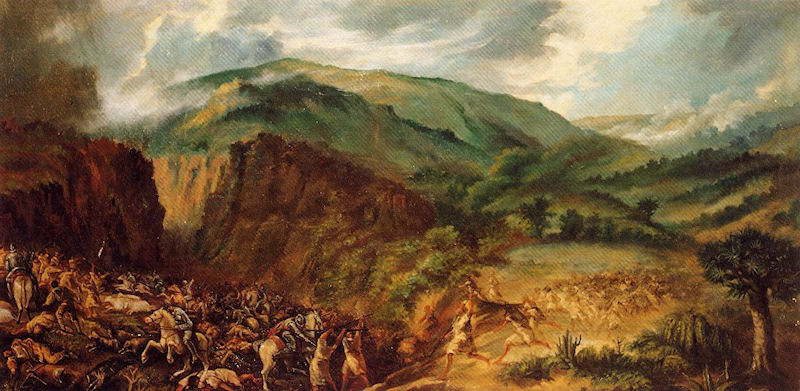
Date	31 May 1494
Location	La Matanza de Acentejo, Tenerife 28°27′10″N 16°27′20″W
Result	Guanche victory

Belligerents
(Crown of Castile) Castile; Güímar	Taoro; Tacoronte; Tegueste; Daute; Icode

Commanders and leaders
(Crown of Castile) Alonso Fernández de Lugo (WIA)	Bencomo; Tinguaro

Strength
Around 1,120	Around 300 under Tinguaro and 3,000 with Bencomo

Casualties and losses
Around 900–1,000	Unknown
- Location within Canary Islands

The First Battle of Acentejo took place on the island of Tenerife between the Guanches and an alliance of Spaniards, other Europeans, and associated natives (mostly from other islands), on 31 May 1494, during the Spanish conquest of this island. It resulted in a victory for the Guanches of Tenerife.

== Background ==
The Spaniards were under the command of the Adelantado ("military governor") Alonso Fernández de Lugo, who had sold his properties in order to finance his conquest of Tenerife. Fernández de Lugo was aided by the fact that missionaries had already begun to Christianize the Guanches of Tenerife, and several of the Guanches' menceyatos or kingdoms, which included Güímar, Abona, Adeje, and later Anaga, were friendly to the Castilians (and known in Spanish as bandos de paz). Fernández de Lugo landed at Añazo, near present-day Santa Cruz de Tenerife, in late April, and built the fortified camp of el Real de Santa Cruz.

== Lugo's advance ==
Advancing towards the interior of the island, Fernández de Lugo confirmed his friendship with the bandos de paz and attempted to reach the same arrangement with other Guanche menceyatos, including Taoro. Bencomo, the ruler of Taoro, refused Fernández de Lugo's terms, and instead began to form his own alliance against the Castilians, composed of the menceyatos of Tacoronte, Tegueste, Daute, and Icode.

In a state of war, Fernández de Lugo advanced through present-day San Cristóbal de La Laguna to the area known as Acentejo.

== Castilian blunder and Guanche victory ==
The Castilians committed the terrible blunder of walking blindly into the ravine now called Barranco de San Antonio (Farfan was its Guanche name), in Acentejo. Despite their technological superiority — the Spaniards, protected with armour and shields, fought with swords, pikes, crossbows, and a limited number of early arequebuses — the Guanches, fighting naked, attacked them from the slopes with stones and spears of hardened wood (known as banotes). The Spaniards were unable to maneuver with their horses, because these slopes were covered with very thick, arboreal brush, and the Guanches, who numbered some 3,300 men under the leadership of Bencomo and his half-brother Tinguaro, chief of the comarca of Acentejo, made use of their mobility and intimate knowledge of the terrain to gain the upper hand. While Tinguaro with 300 men ambushed the vanguard of the Castilian forces, Bencomo arrived at the battle with 3,000 men, attacking the rearguard of the dispersed Europeans. It is believed that four out of five Spanish soldiers fell in this battle, leaving 900–1,000 dead on the battlefield out of the initial 1,120.

== Aftermath and legacy ==
The defeat was not total, however. Fernández de Lugo, though wounded, was able to escape with his life (by exchanging the red cape of an Adelantado for that of a common soldier), and his surviving forces (some 200 men) were harried until he was forced to re-embark at Añazo and sail back to Gran Canaria. The Adelantado was able to return and defeat the native forces in two major battles: the Battle of Aguere and Second Battle of Acentejo, and other minor clashes, such as the Battle of Las Peñuelas.

A town built on the site where the battle occurred is called La Matanza de Acentejo ("The Slaughter of Acentejo"), which also contains a large mural commemorating the victory.

This was the greatest defeat in the history of the Spanish Atlantic expansion, in terms of casualties suffered by Spain.
