= La Matanza de Acentejo =

- Municipality
- Flag Coat of arms

- Municipal location in Tenerife

- Location of the town in Tenerife La Matanza de Acentejo (Canary Islands) La Matanza de Acentejo (Spain, Canary Islands)
- Coordinates: 28°27′10″N 16°27′20″W
- Country: Spain
- Autonomous community: Canary Islands
- Province: Santa Cruz de Tenerife
- Island: Tenerife

Area
  - Total: 14.11 km^{2} (5.45 sq mi)
- Elevation: 425 m (1,394 ft)

Population (2025-01-01)
  - Total: 9,089
  - Density: 644.2/km^{2} (1,668/sq mi)
- Climate: Csb

La Matanza de Acentejo is a town near the north coast of Tenerife, Canary Islands, Spain. It is located 10 km east of Puerto de la Cruz, and about 20 km west of the island's capital, Santa Cruz de Tenerife. Its name means "the Slaughter of Acentejo" in Spanish, and refers to the 1494 First Battle of Acentejo, lost by the Spanish.

The population is 8,944 (2013) and the area is 14.11 km^{2}. The elevation is 425 m. The TF-5 motorway passes through the municipality. The municipality contains the following settlements:

- La Matanza de Acentejo
- Guia
- Las Breñas
- El Caleton
- Acentejo
- San Antonio
- San Cristobal

== Toponomy ==
The municipality takes its name from its administrative capital, which in turn comes from the memory of the battle that took place in this area between Castilians and Guanches during the conquest of the island in the 15th century, in which the latter defeated the former.

Until the reform of the municipal nomenclature in 1916, the municipality was simply called La Matanza. On that date its name was modified to La Matanza de Acentejo. The nickname "de Acentejo" was incorporated into the municipal name to differentiate it from other homonymous towns, being a term of Guanche origin that means 'continuous resonance' according to some researchers.

== History ==
In historic times before the arrival of the Spaniards, Acentejo was part of the menceyato (kingdom) of Taoro. The first and the second battles of Acentejo took place in 1494. The Spanish under Alonso Fernández de Lugo suffered a terrible defeat at this first battle, at the place now called La Matanza ("The Slaughter"). It occurred in present-day Barranco de San Antonio, which the Guanches called Farfan. The second battle resulted in a victory for the Spaniards, in which the town of La Victoria de Acentejo was founded.

Currently under construction is a scale replica of the interior of the Holy Sepulchre in Jerusalem (the place where according to Christian tradition, was taken the body of Jesus Christ after his crucifixion), the replica will be located in the plaza of El Salvador's municipality. In this room is to also place a replica of the Shroud of Turin (Italy).

== Historical population ==
Year	Population
1991	5,887
1996	6,451
2001	7,053
2002	7,378
2003	7,490
2004	7,587
2013	8,944

== Notable people ==
- Antonio de Benavides, governor of Spanish Florida

== See also ==
- List of municipalities in Santa Cruz de Tenerife
