= Acaimo =

Gaunche mencey (fl. 1400s)

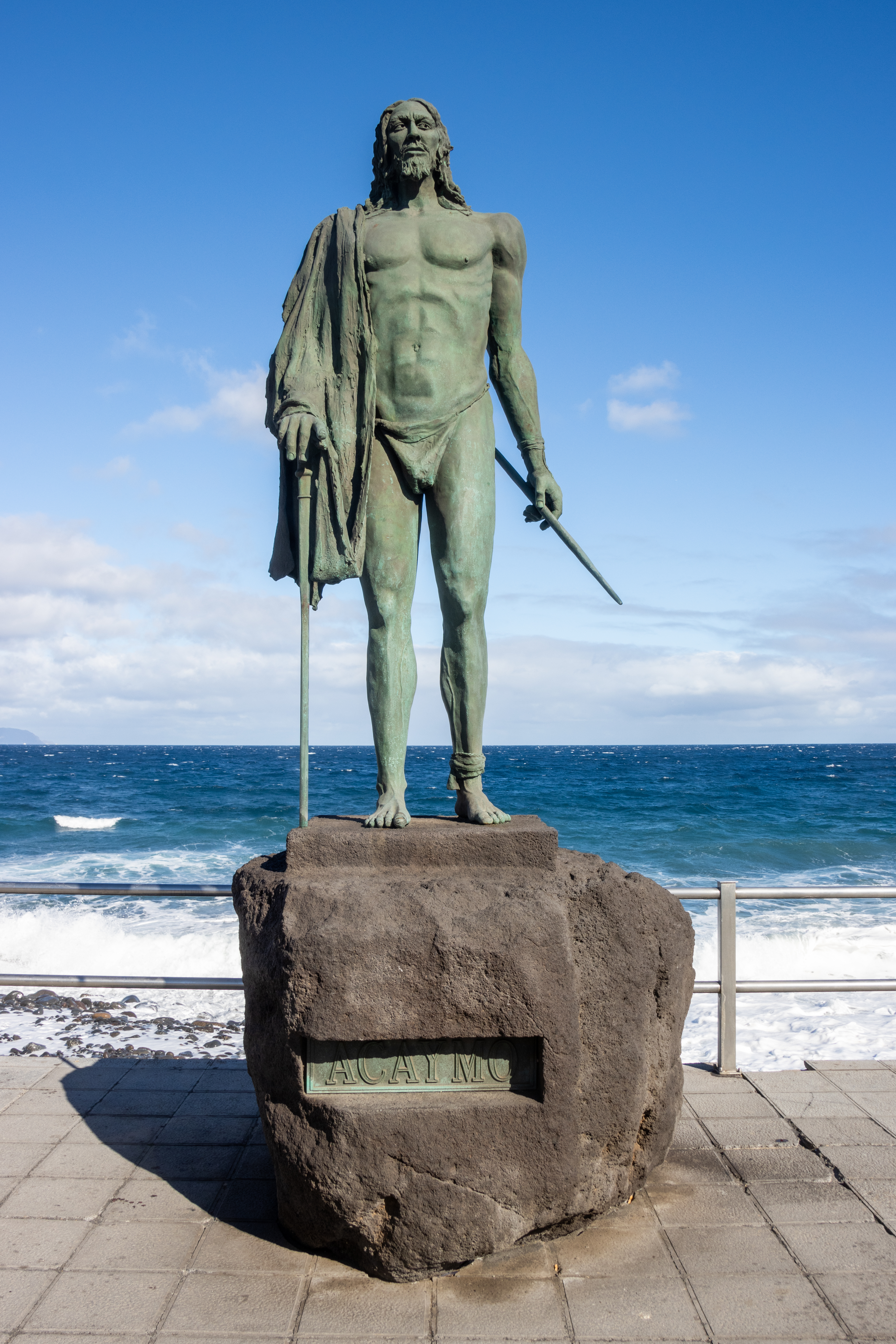
- Born: 15th Century; Tenerife
- Other names: Acaymo Daniaga
- Occupation: Mencey of Tacoronte
- Years active: ?–1496
- Known for: The Conquest of Tenerife
- Predecessor: Rumen and Aniaga
- Parent(s): Rumen and Aniaga
- Relatives: Badenol (brother), Hañagua (sister)

Acaimo or Acaymo was a Guanche mencey of Tacoronte, on the island of Tenerife at the time of the Spanish conquest in the 15th century. He formed an alliance against the Spaniards with the mencey Beneharo and the mencey Bencomo.

== Biography ==
=== Family and Descendancy ===
Acaimo descended from the first mencey of Tacoronte, who was called "Rumén" or "Romén" by Juan Núñez de la Peña. During the division of the island, which occurred after the death of his father, Tinerfe the Great, in the late fourteenth century, Acaimo took his father's territory. However, the scholar Juan Álvarez Delgado says that Aniaga is the parent of Acaimo, and Acaimo's full name is Acaimo Daniaga. From Peña, Aniaga married a sister of Acaimo de Güímar, and because of this, she gave another name to her son.

On the other hand, Viana also mentioned another son of the mencey, whose name was Badenol, who died in the second Acentejo battle. She referred to Acaimo de Tacoronte as a nephew of the mencey Beheharo. For Álvarez Delgado, Hañagua, the wife of mencey Bencomo, she was also a sister of mencey Tacoronte.

It is known, however, some Guanches who were integrated into the new society and taking, as Christians, the name Tacoronte, may be related to the mencey.

== Other ==
Acaymo was also the name of the ruling mencey of Güímar during the appearance of the Virgin of Candelaria (Patron of Canary Islands). According to the chronicler Fray Alonso de Espinosa, Acaymo was now the king of Güímar Guanche (where the occurrence took place).
