= Spanish immigration to Cuba =

Total population
- 1,185 Born in Spain (2025 INE); 176,570 Spanish nationals

Regions with significant populations

Languages
- Spanish

Religion
- Predominantly Roman Catholicism; Large Protestantism minority

Related ethnic groups
- Spaniards, Other Latin Europeans

Spanish immigration to Cuba (Spanish: Inmigración española a Cuba) began in 1492, when the Spanish first landed on the island, and continues to the present day. The first sighting of a Spanish boat approaching the island was on 27 October 1492, probably at Bariay on the eastern point of the island. Columbus, on his first voyage to the Americas, sailed south from what is now The Bahamas to explore the northeast coast of Cuba and the northern coast of Hispaniola. Columbus came to the island believing it to be a peninsula of the Asian mainland.

== Early settlement ==
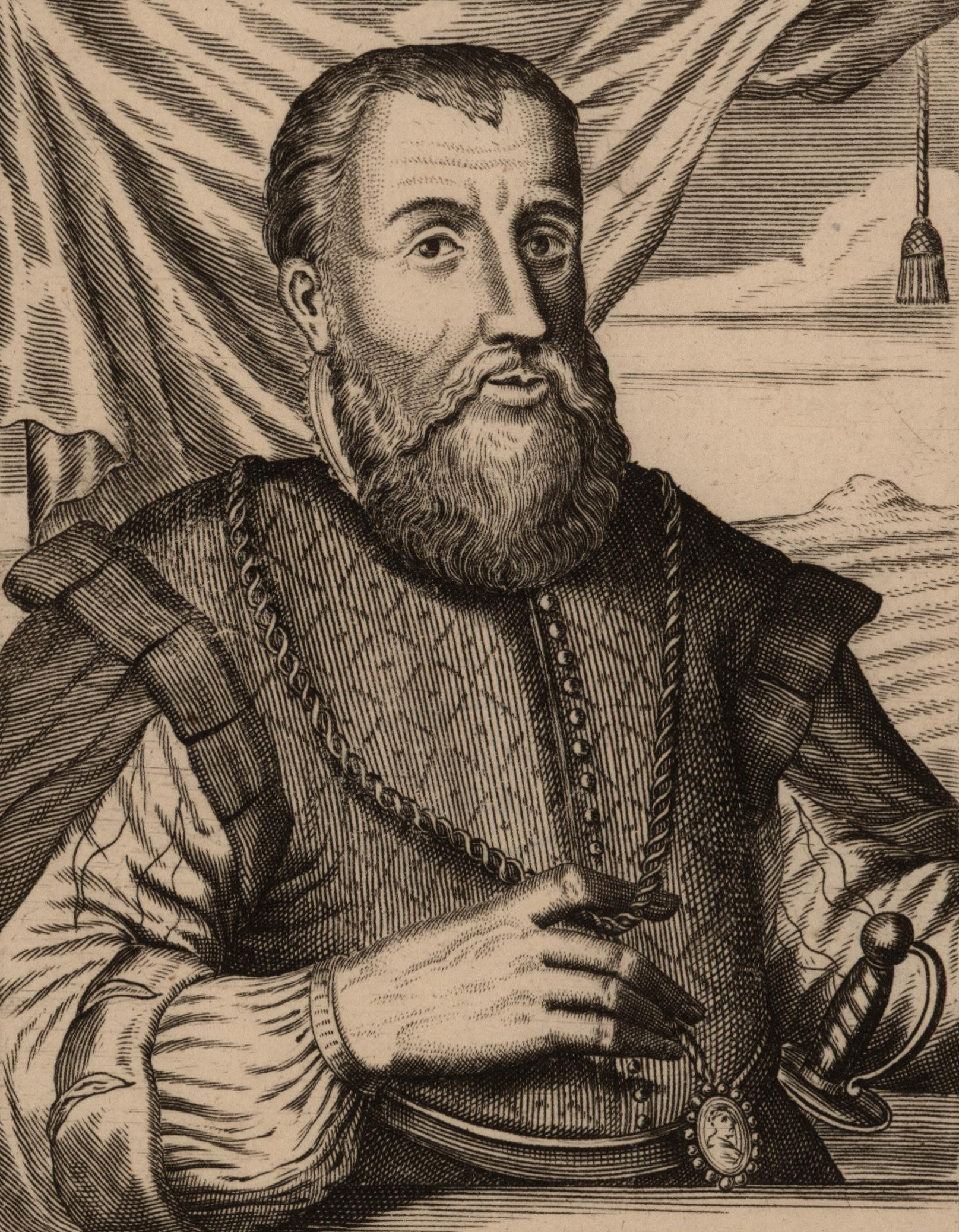
Diego Velázquez de Cuéllar, the first governor of Cuba.

In 1511, Diego Velázquez de Cuéllar set out with three ships and an army of 300 men from Hispaniola to form the first Spanish settlement in Cuba, with orders from Spain to conquer the island. The settlement was at Baracoa, but the new settlers were to be greeted with stiff resistance from the local Taíno population. The Taínos were initially organized by cacique (chieftain) Hatuey, who had himself relocated from Hispaniola to escape the brutalities of Spanish rule on that island. After a prolonged guerrilla campaign, Hatuey and successive chieftains were captured and burnt alive, and within three years the Spanish had gained control of the island. In 1514, a settlement was founded in what was to become Havana.

== Cultural impact ==
=== Cuban Spanish ===
Spanish was brought to Cuba by the Spaniards. Cuban Spanish is most similar to, and originates largely from the Spanish spoken in the Canary Islands. Cuba owes much of its speech patterns and accent to the heavy Canarian migrations, of the 19th and early 20th centuries. The accent of La Palma is the closest of the Canary Island accents to the Cuban accent. Many Cubans settled in the United States after the revolution of 1959. Migration of other Spanish settlers (Asturians, Catalans, Castilians), and especially Galicians also occurred, but left less influence on the accent.

=== Religion ===
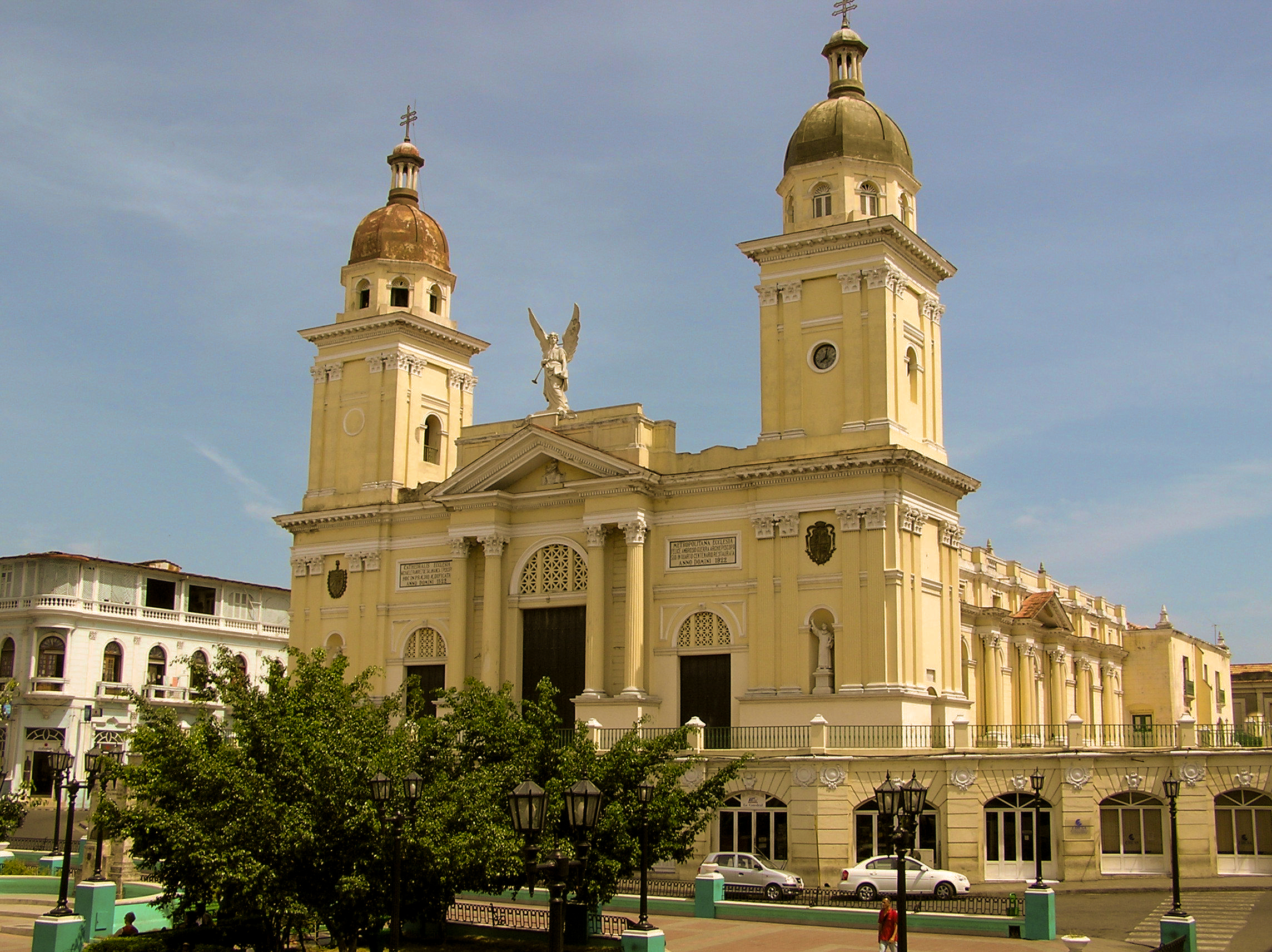
The Cathedral Basilica of Santiago de Cuba The first church in Cuba was built in 1514.

Cuba is traditionally a Catholic country. The Roman Catholic religion was brought to Cuba by Spanish colonialists at the beginning of the 16th century, is the most prevalent professed faith. After the revolution, Cuba became an officially atheistic state and restricted religious practice. Since the Fourth Cuban Communist Party Congress in 1991, restrictions have been eased and, according to the National Catholic Observer, direct challenges by state institutions to the right to religion have all but disappeared, though the church still faces restrictions of written and electronic communication, and can only accept donations from state-approved funding sources. The Roman Catholic Church is made up of the Cuban Catholic Bishops' Conference (COCC), led by Juan García Rodríguez since 2016, Cardinal Archbishop of Havana.

The Roman Catholic Church estimates that 60 percent of the population is Catholic. But the Catholic Church is subject to government restrictions, and it is not allowed to have its own schools or media. According to statistics, Catholics represent 71.79% of Havana's population, 69.24% Matanzas, 63.15% Camagüey and Santiago de Cuba having the lowest percentage of Catholics at 23.81%.

== Immigration waves ==
The European heritage of Cubans comes primarily from one source: the Spaniards (including Canarians, Asturians, Catalans, Galicians, Andalusians, and Castilians).

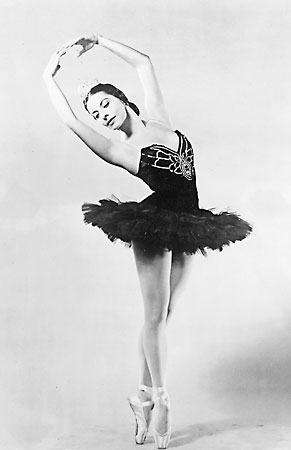
Cuban prima ballerina Alicia Alonso was of Spanish descent.

The native white population are nearly all descendants of the Spaniards and most non-white Cubans also have Spanish ancestry.

=== 20th century ===
==== Regions ====
This table shows the ethnic composition of Spanish residents in Cuba in the year 1900. The three largest groups Galicians, Asturians and Islanders constituted 68% of all Spanish immigrants.

Spanish arrivals by region in 1900
Region	Population	%
Galician	19,088	28.56
Asturian	15,853	23.72
Canary Islander	10,509	15.72
Old Castile	5,126	7.6
Catalan	3,563	5.33
Andalusian	3,185	4.76
León	2,255	3.57
Basque	1,760	2.63
New Castile	1,225	1.83
Valencian	1,047	1.56
Balearic	869	1.32
Aragonese	780	1.16
Navarrese	754	1.12
Murcia	419	0.62
Extremaduran	384	0.50
Total	66,817	100

For four years, between 1916 and 1920, Cuba was the first major destination of Spanish migrants to Latin America (about 60%), and the second major destination, after Argentina, between 1900 and 1930. From 1902 to 1931, more than 60% of immigrants to Cuba were Spanish. Some sources estimate this figure reached 80% at some point in this timeframe. This immense Spanish immigration surge was important to Cuba's social and demographic framework, particularly in the urban and agricultural industries. results show that between 1902 and 1931, 780,400 (60.8%) were from Spain, 197,600 (15.4%) from Haiti, 115,600 (9.0%) from Jamaica and 190,300 (14.8%) other countries.

=== Concurrent situation ===
According to current statistics, there are over 9,566 Canarians, 23,185 Andalusians and 11,114 Galicians living in Cuba.

According to the National Statistics Institute data in January 2025 there were 1,185 Spanish born citizens resident in Cuba. In total, 176,570 Spanish nationals are resident in Cuba as of 2025, overwhelmingly claimed through Spanish ancestral origin. This represents 5.8% of the total worldwide population of Spanish nationals at 3,045,966.

== Spanish regions ==
=== Andalusians ===
Andalusians are a fairly large community in Cuba, in fact the way Cubans speak is strongly influenced by the Spanish dialect of Andalusia (in the same way as the Canarian accent).

Bullfighting, as well as the traditional Andalusian cultural festival, also has a presence in Cuba since the colonial period and uninterrupted from 1538 to 1899. In Havana there are many bullrings and bullfighters from Cádiz, Spain pass through them. In the first half of the 19th century, bullfights were held in Sancti Spíritus in 1850 and in other cities. In the 19th century, Havana and Montevideo were the cities with the most bullfights, which finally lost the tradition in the last years of the 20th century.

=== Asturians ===
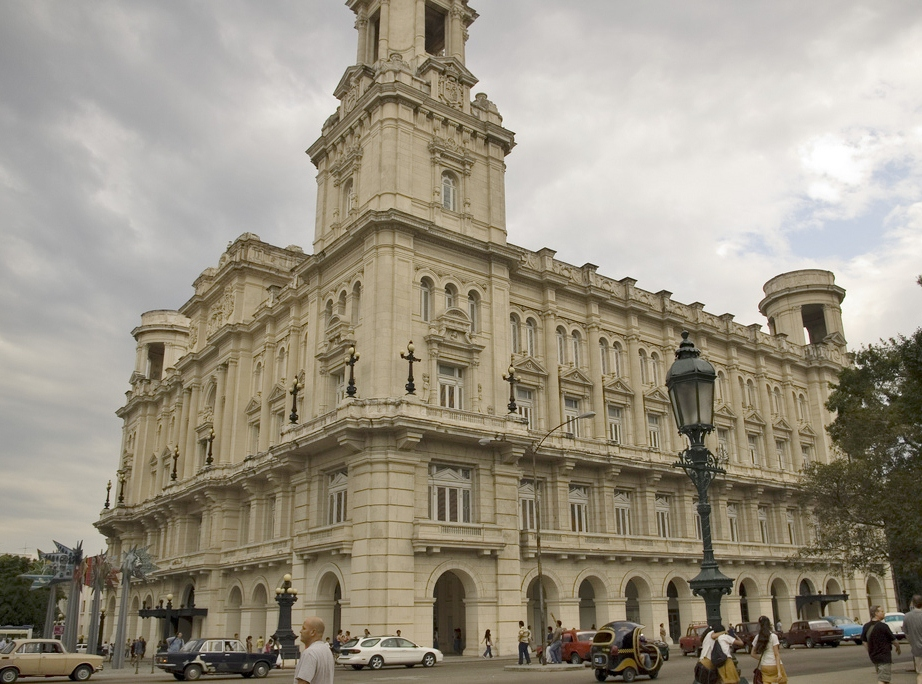
The Palacio del Centro Asturiano built in 1927 was created as a social club for Asturians.

Asturians are a fairly large community in Cuba. A Cuban, the son of an Asturian, is the author of the anthem of the Principality of Asturias.

=== Canarians ===
Canarians are a fairly large community in Cuba. The first Canarians that settled on the island arrived in 1492, coming from the ships of Christopher Columbus (three of Columbus's four voyages passed through the Canary Islands). The next group of Canarians to settle in Cuba was in the last third of the 16th century. Due to the fact that at that time the Canary Islands were still repopulating, the Canarian ethnic group that arrived in Cuba was very small. Despite this, it is estimated that between 1585 and 1655, the Canarians represented around 25.6% of the immigrants to Havana. It was not until the seventeenth century, especially with the Blood Tribute (1678-1764), when the Canarian emigration acquired a massive air towards the island, with a massive migration of thousands of Canarians from that moment to Cuba. In fact, in the 18th century, it was the second Canarian emigration country after Venezuela. Although the Blood Tribute was banned in 1764, many Canarians continued to emigrate to Cuba.

Thus, in the 19th century and in the first half of the 20th, Cuba became the main Canarian emigration country that, together with Puerto Rico (in the first of those centuries), absorbed most of the Canarian immigrants who arrived. to America to improve their economic conditions, something that, despite everything, they barely achieved in these countries. Thus, in the Cuban war of independence, numerous canaries and their descendants participated in the liberating side, among which José Martí stood out, and many canaries also participated in the royalist side.

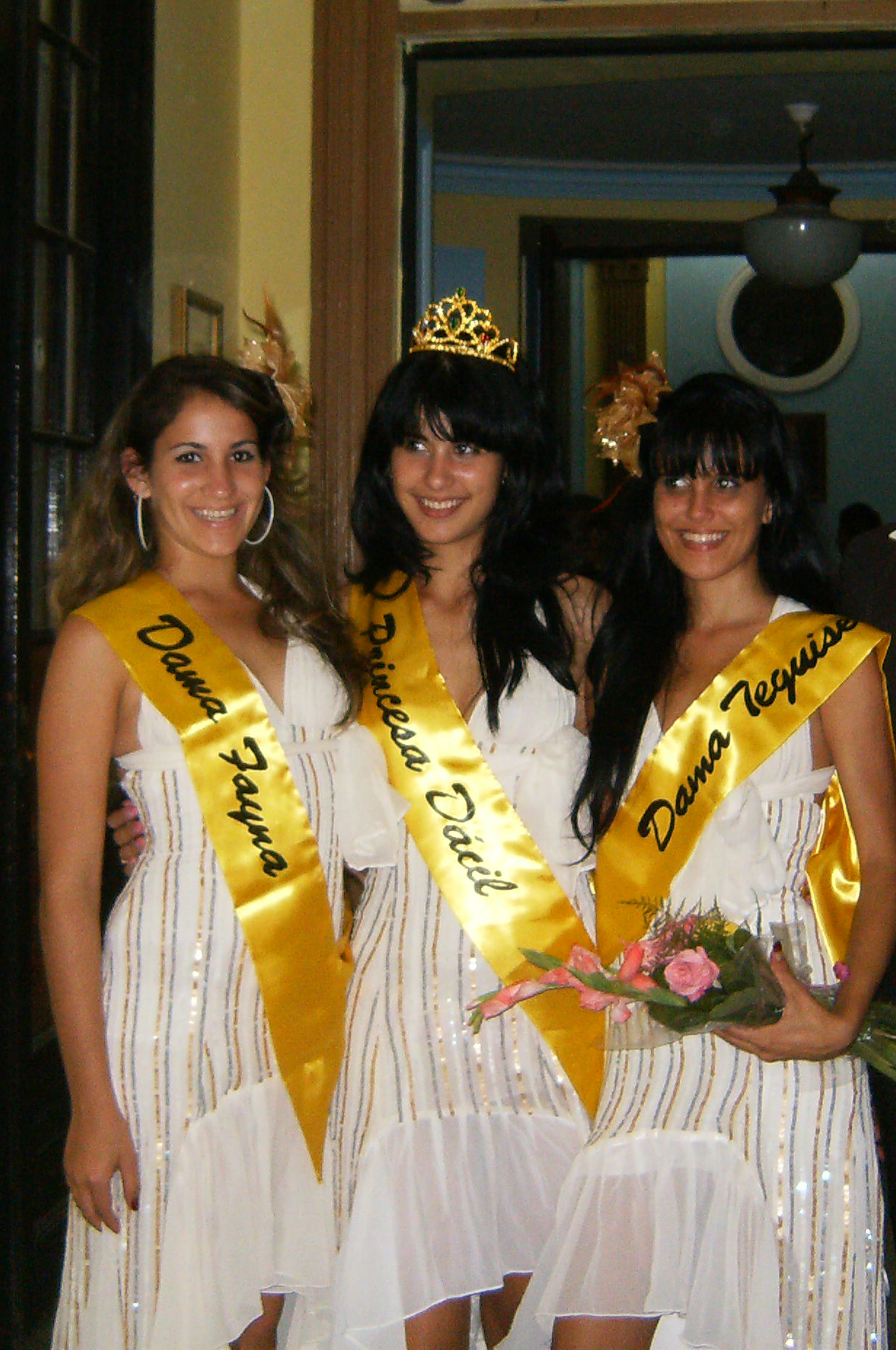
Celebration of the "Princess Dácil" contest at the Seventh Festival of Canarian Traditions in Cuba.

Most of the Canarians came from Tenerife, Gran Canaria and La Palma and settled in cities such as Havana, Matanzas, Oriente, Pinar del Río and in the center of the island, basically dedicating themselves to agriculture. Currently, due to the Canarian emigration to Cuba and Venezuela during the 20th century, most of the Canarians have a family member in those countries. Like a large part of Cubans, they also have some Canarian ancestor. Among others, the following stand out: Lina Ruz González (mother of Fidel Castro), José Martí, Gertrudis Gómez de Avellaneda and Silvestre de Balboa, who, still born in the Canary Islands, is considered the first Cuban writer.

Currently, people of Canarian descent in Cuba preserve their culture and traditions through the celebration of various cultural festivals and other activities. An example is the Festival of Canarian Traditions in Cuba that is held annually, as well as the contest called "Princess Dácil", which is named in honor of a Guanche princess from the Canary Islands.

=== Catalans ===
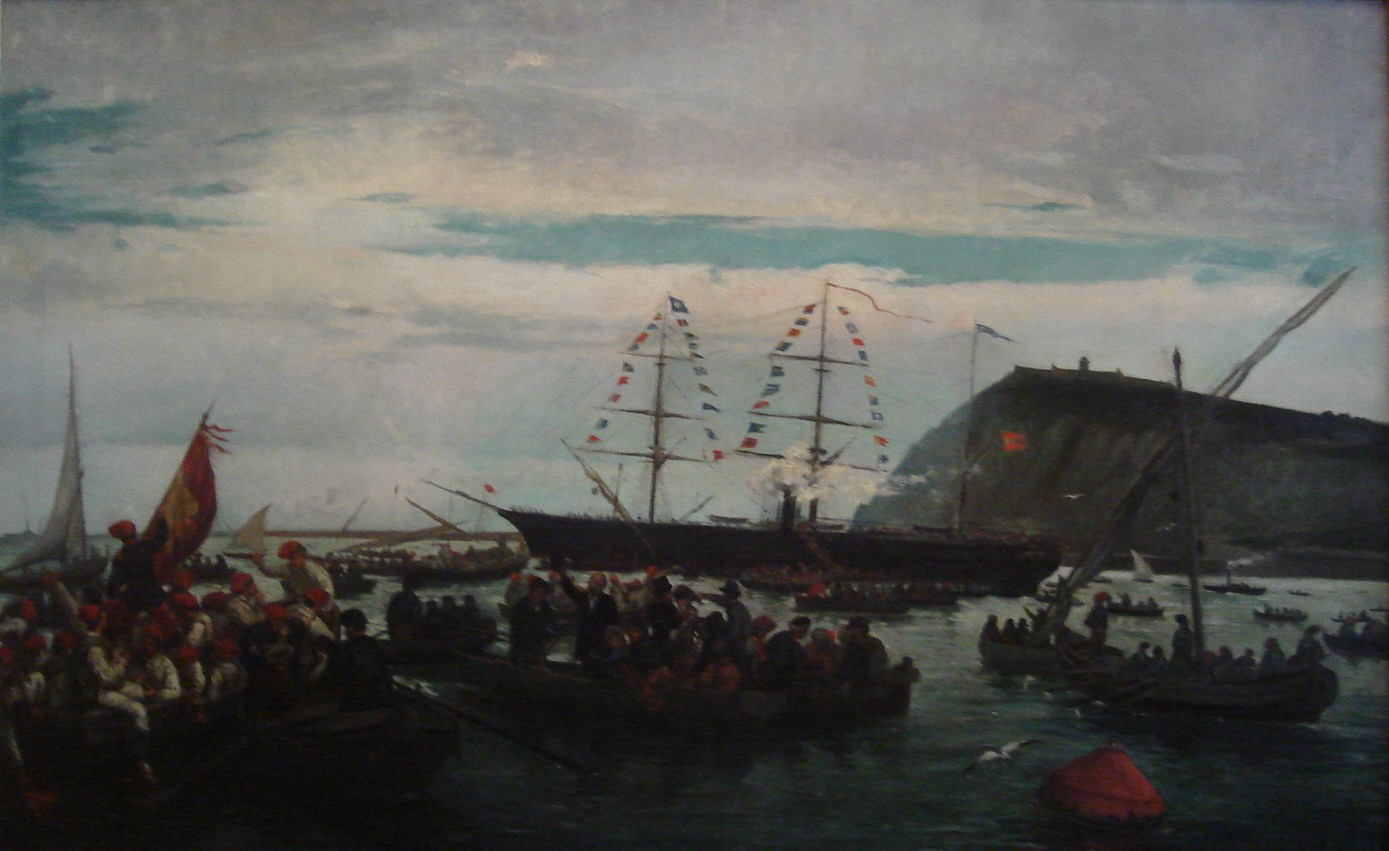
Catalan soldiers' levies before being sent to Cuba

Catalans are a fairly large community in Cuba, proof of this is the large number of Catalan surnames that appear in the telephone directory. It could be considered that the existing Catalan regionalism in Spain was accentuated as a result of the independence of Cuba, since the Catalan business sector monopolized commerce and the textile industry, as well as sugar cane with its derivatives.

In recent times, a large part of Spanish investments in Cuba, especially in the tourism sector, come from Catalan capital.

=== Galicians ===
The Galicians have more than 15,300 members approximately, dispersed mainly in Havana, Cárdenas, Matanzas, Pinar del Río, Camagüey, Trinidad, Cienfuegos, Santa Clara, Santiago de Cuba and Guantánamo.

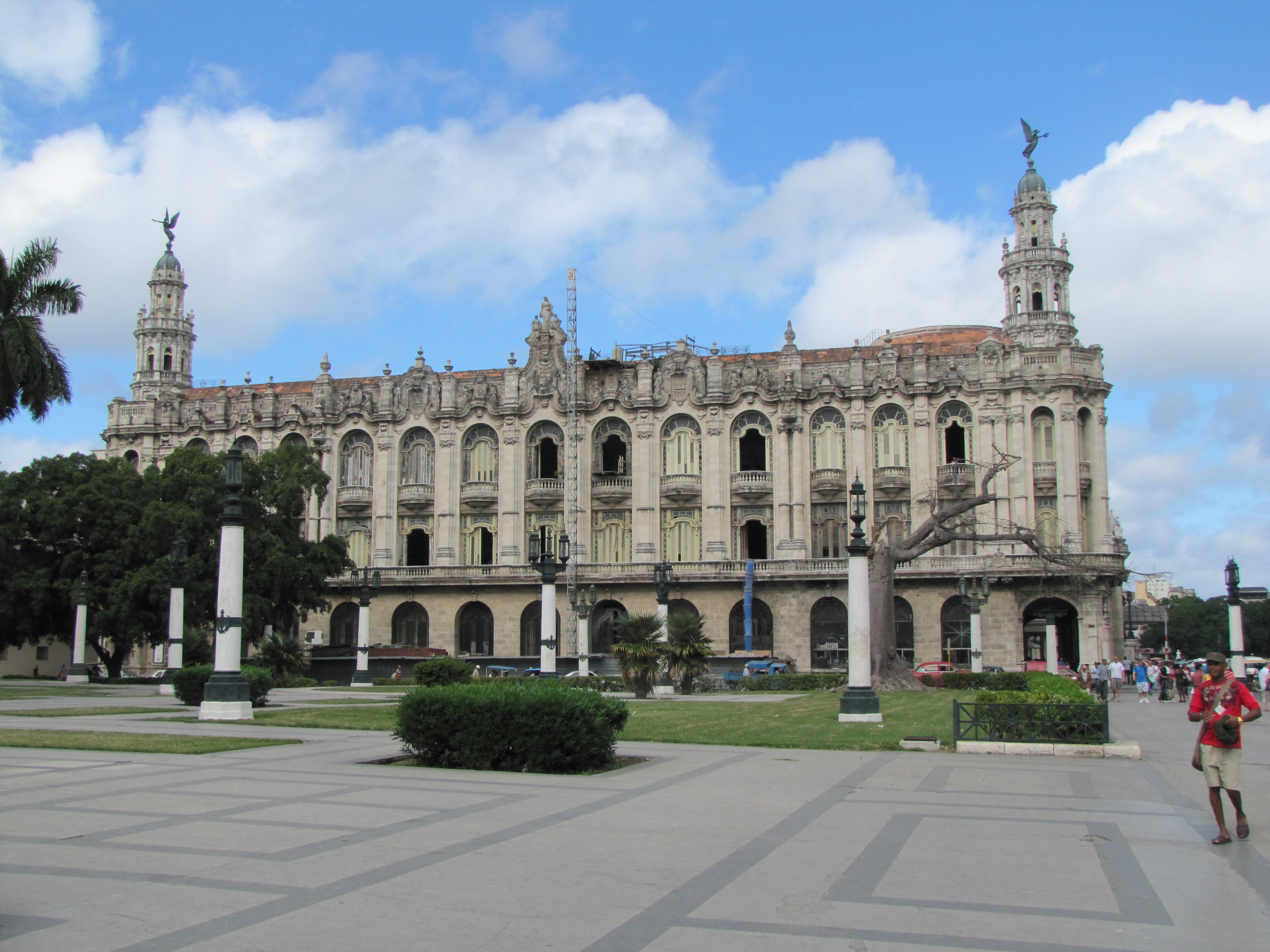
Gran Teatro de La Habana, formally Centro Gallego until 1961.

They arrived from Vigo, to the port of Havana between 1821 and 1877, fleeing famine and political pressure. Many Galicians and other Iberians who had arrived on the island later moved to Mexico and the United States between the 1920s and 1940s.

When the Galicians began to settle in some parts of the island, they began to produce and work both in the fields and in Havana. The Gran Teatro de La Habana previously called Gran Teatro -Centro Gallego until 1961, was built, which housed a very large theater inside, and it was in Havana where the Galician Anthem, called "Os Pinos" (Los Pinos), was sung for the first time in 1924.

Fidel Castro's father, Ángel Castro Argiz, was a Galician, specifically from Láncara, Lugo province.

== See also ==
- Cuba–Spain relations
