= Dácil =

Guanche princess

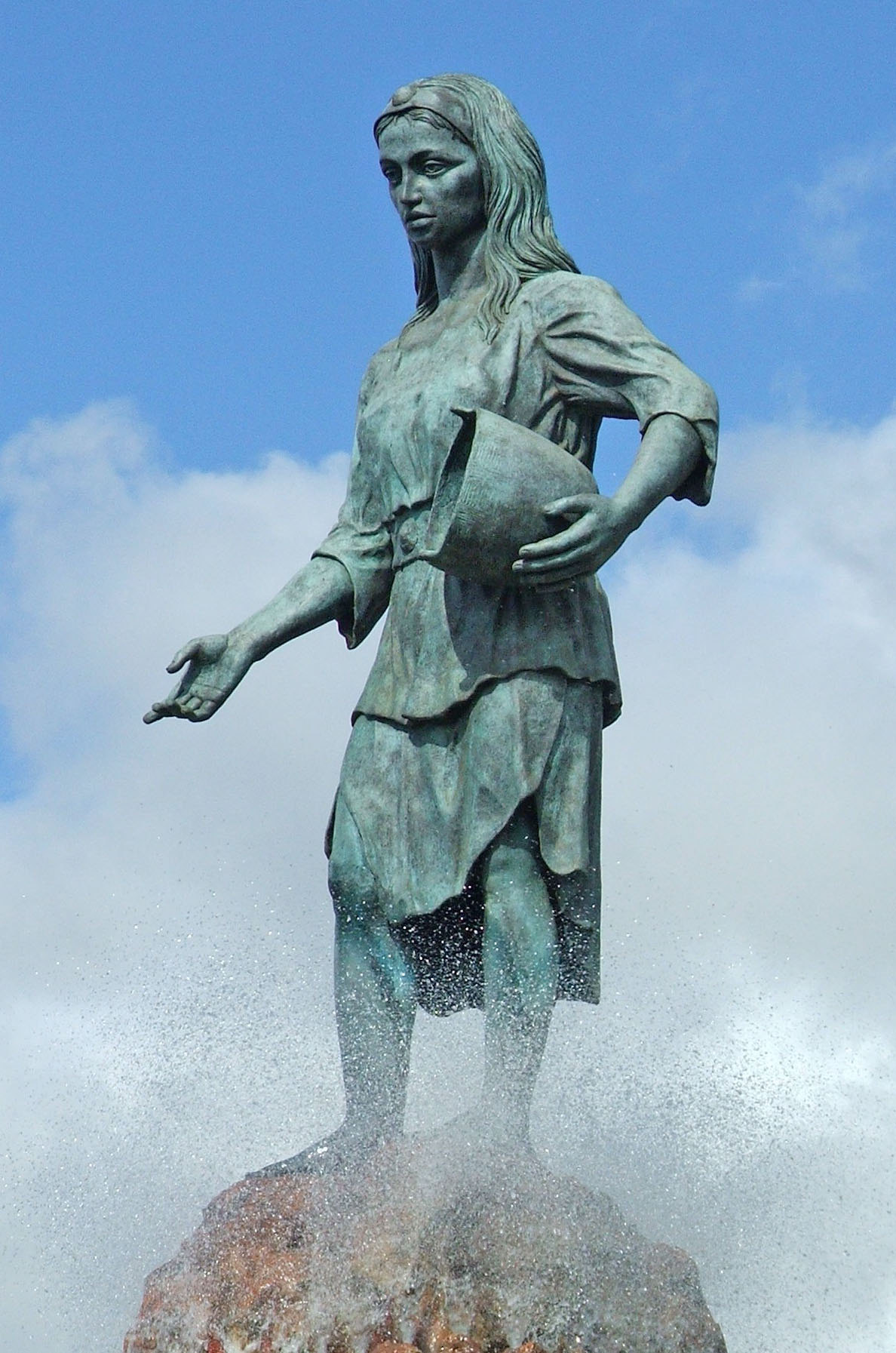
- A statue of Dácil in La Orotava
- Born: c. 1460; Taoro (Tenerife, Canary Islands)
- Died: Unknown; Unknown
- Occupation: Princess (daughter of Bencomo)
- Spouse: Fernando García del Castillo
- Parent(s): Adjona and Caseloria

Princess Dácil was a Guanche princess of the kingdom of Taoro on the island of Tenerife (in the Canary Islands), best known for her marriage to a conqueror of the island.

== Early life ==
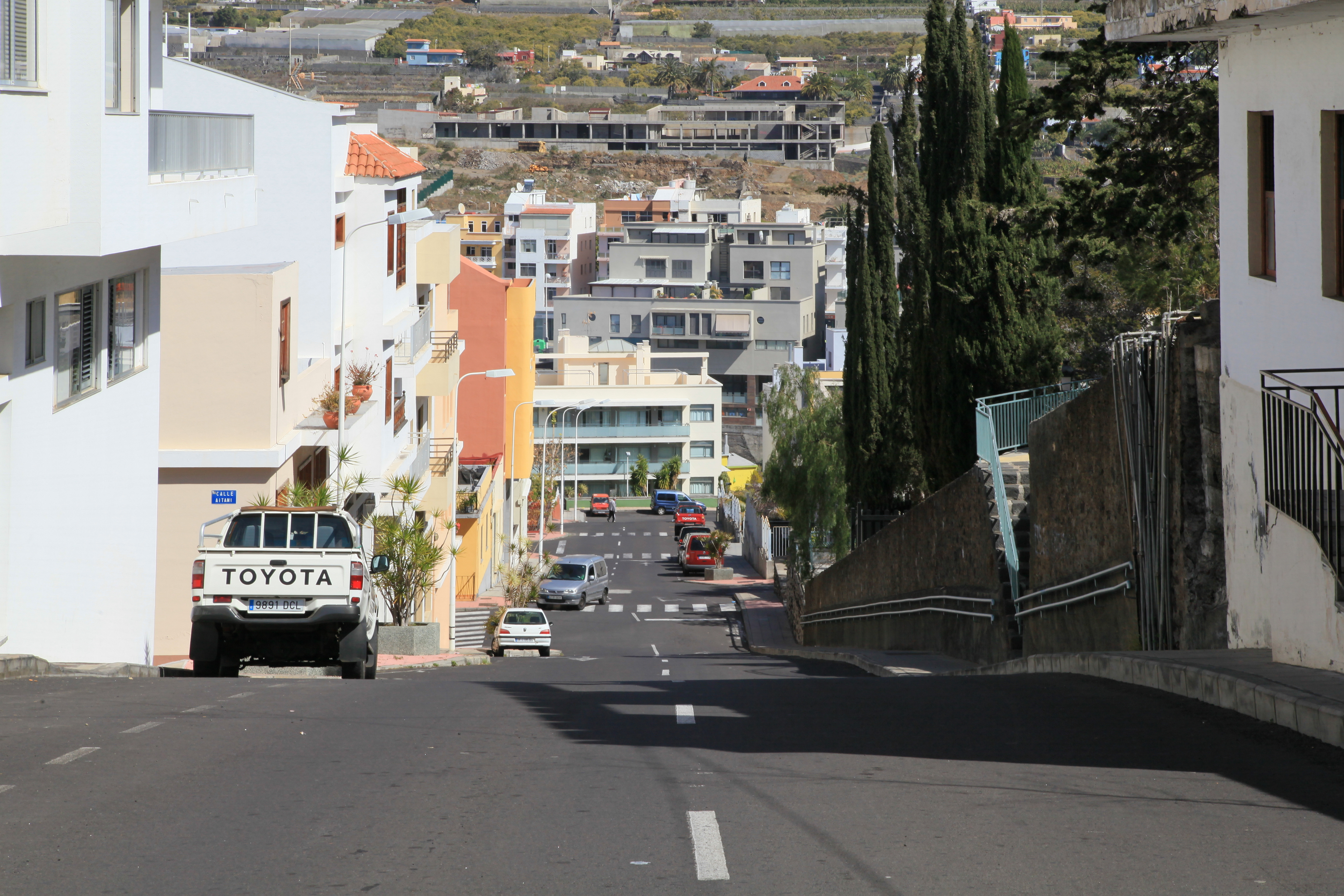
The "Calle Princesa Dácil" in Las Palmas is named after her.

Dácil or Dácila was born in the ancient Menceyato (kingdom) of Taoro (Tenerife, Canary Island), during the early second half of the fifteenth century. She was daughter to Mencey (king) Adjona and Caseloria and granddaughter of Bencomo. She had five brothers: Bentor, Ruiman, Rosalva, Chachiñama, and Tiñate. Dácil was admired throughout the island for her beauty. She was described as blonde and freckled, with green eyes.

== Personal life ==
Dácil was initially intended to marry Duriman el Montañes (Duriman of the Mountains). However, with the arrival of the Spanish Captain Fernando García del Castillo, a Castilian officer of a Spanish Cavalry unit, Dácil gained another suitor. Captain Fernando García del Castillo was taken prisoner and placed under the care of Princess Dácil so that she could see to the wounds he had suffered in the Battle of Aguere. According to several historians, Captain Fernando García del Castillo acted as a diplomat, providing services between the Guanches and invading Spanish people, and was honored with some estimates by the King of Taoro.

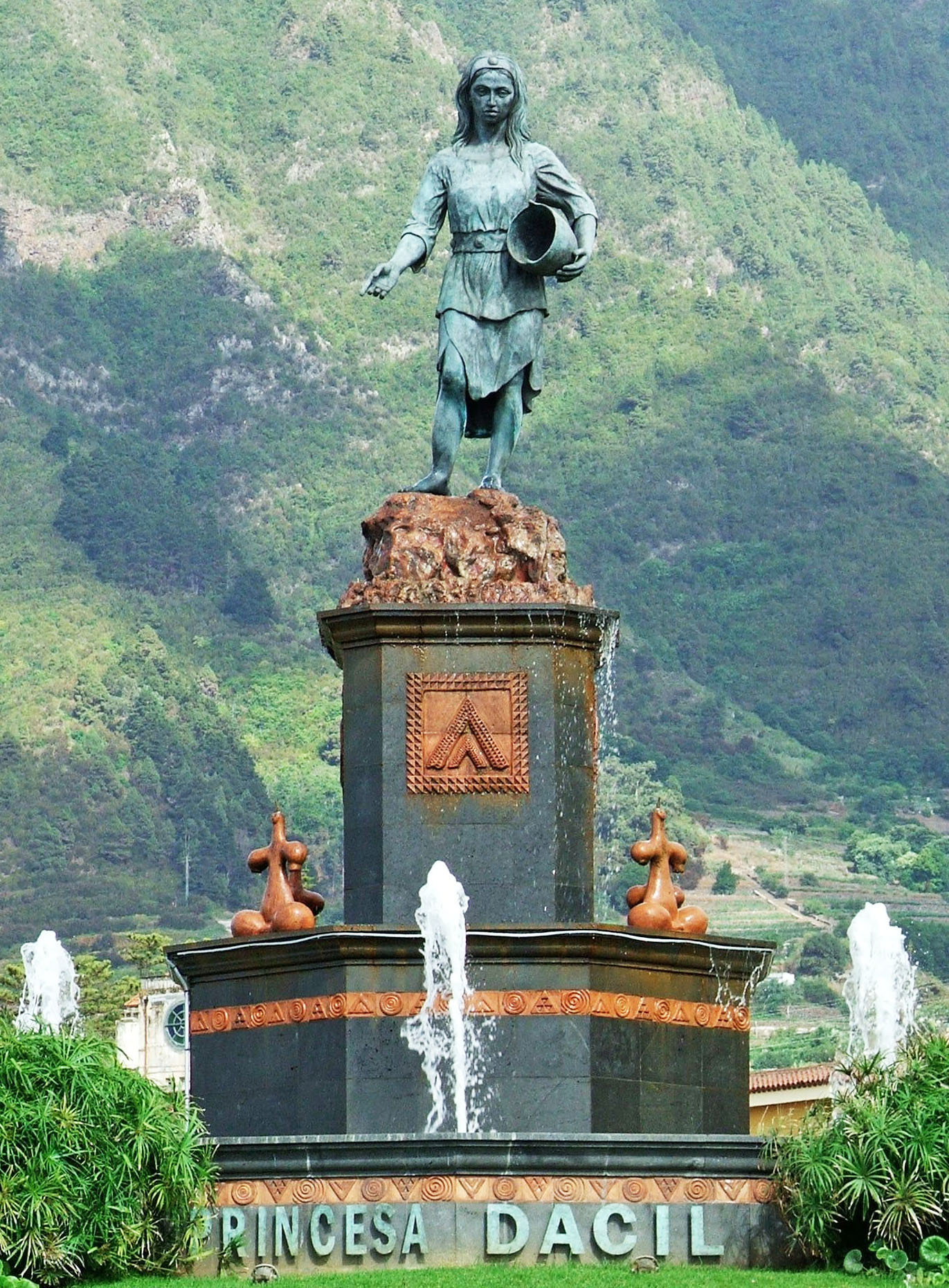
A statue of Dácil in La Orotava

Rumors began to surface that Captain Fernando García del Castillo and Princess Dácil were lovers. They were believed to have spoken alone—a practice strictly forbidden by Guanche law. The Guanche, Duriman El Montanez, who was promised Dácil in marriage felt spurned and further fed accusations of her being alone with a man, who was, in addition, a Castilian, and, therefore, the enemy of the Guanche homeland. Duriman el Montañes asked Bencomo to arrest Princess Dácil (Bencomo's granddaughter). Bencomo complied with the law and imprisoned Dácil for many months. When she was released, Dácil was able to convince Bencomo that she had never met Captain Fernando García del Castillo alone; that, in fact, she had many witnesses to attest that she was always accompanied when meeting with the Castilian captain. She later married the captain in the Iglesia de la Concepción (Church of the Conception) of Los Realejos. She was baptized as Mencías del Castillo. The date of Dácil's death and her place of burial are unknown.

== Influence on the Canary Islands ==
- The marriage of Dácil and Castilian was considered as the bond of brotherhood between the Guanches people and the Spanish people, though the Spanish conquerors and settlers enslaved the Guanches and subjected them to their culture and language in the early sixteenth century.
- The poet Antonio de Viana (1578–1650?) turned the story of Dácil into one of his best-known poems in the Canary Island, in his book La Conquista de Tenerife (1604) (The Conquest of Tenerife (1604)). Many people met the princess through the poem and considered him a unique poet. However, as a historian, Bethencourt Alfonso, once said: "this princess plays an important role in Viana's poem; a figure that was not imaginary; she was of flesh and blood."
- Her name is one of the many Guanche names that, fortunately for the Canary Island, have not been lost, since there are still people named Dácil throughout the archipelago.
- She is also one of the better known historical figures in the archipelago.
