= Second Battle of Acentejo =

1495 conflict

- Part of the Spanish Conquest of the Canary Islands
Date	25 December 1494
Location	Aguere and Acentejo, Tenerife
Result	Spanish victory

Belligerents
Castile, Guanche and European allies	Guanches of Tenerife

Commanders and leaders
Alonso Fernández de Lugo	Tinguaro and Bencomo

Strength
700 Castilians plus 800 Guanche allies	around 6,000

The Second Battle of Acentejo took place on 25 December 1494 between the invading Spanish forces and the natives of the island of Tenerife, known as Guanches. The battle had been preceded by the Battle of Aguere, fought on 14-15 November that year, which had been a Castilian victory.

== Background ==
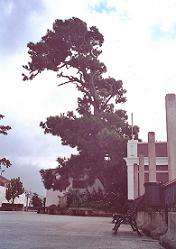
The pine at La Victoria de Acentejo

Advancing along the northern shores of the island, the Spaniards pursued the remaining Guanche forces and faced them once again at Valley of Taoro, near Acentejo, the site of the first battle, called by the Spaniards La Matanza ("The Slaughter").

Adelantado ("military governor") Alonso Fernández de Lugo divided his forces into two, with the Castilians bearing firearms taking the advantage. After three hours of fighting, the Guanches were defeated. Those who were not made prisoners of the Spaniards fled to the mountains.

With shouts of "Victory! Victory!" the Spanish forces celebrated their triumph, and Alonso Fernández de Lugo erected a hermitage in honor of Our Lady of Victory on the site of the battle. A town grew up around it, called La Victoria de Acentejo.

An old Canary Island pine, a witness to the battle, still stands in La Victoria de Acentejo. In its shadow the first mass was celebrated on the day of the battle. From its branches a bell was later hung, since the hermitage that Fernández de Lugo built in the same spot lacked a bell tower.

The mencey Bentor is said to have thrown himself from the heights of Tigaiga after learning of the outcome of the battle.

The Second Battle of Acentejo was certainly not the last battle on Tenerife between the Spaniards and the Guanches, but was certainly the most decisive, resulting in the ultimate incorporation of the island into the Kingdom of Castile and the final subjugation of the aborigines.

It was in the Orotava Valley the conquest of Tenerife ended on 25 July 1496, with the Treaty of Los Realejos between the Taoro mencey and Alonso Fernández de Lugo. It was in honor of the cessation of hostilities that the first Christian church, Parroquia Matriz del Apóstol Santiago, in honor of the patron saint of Spain, was built.

== Sources ==
- Acosta, José Juan; Rodríguez Lorenzo, Félix; Quintero Padrón, Carmelo L. (1988). Conquista y Colonización (in Spanish). Santa Cruz de Tenerife: Centro de la Cultura Popular Canaria. pp. 51–52.
