= Fernando Guanarteme =

Gauche

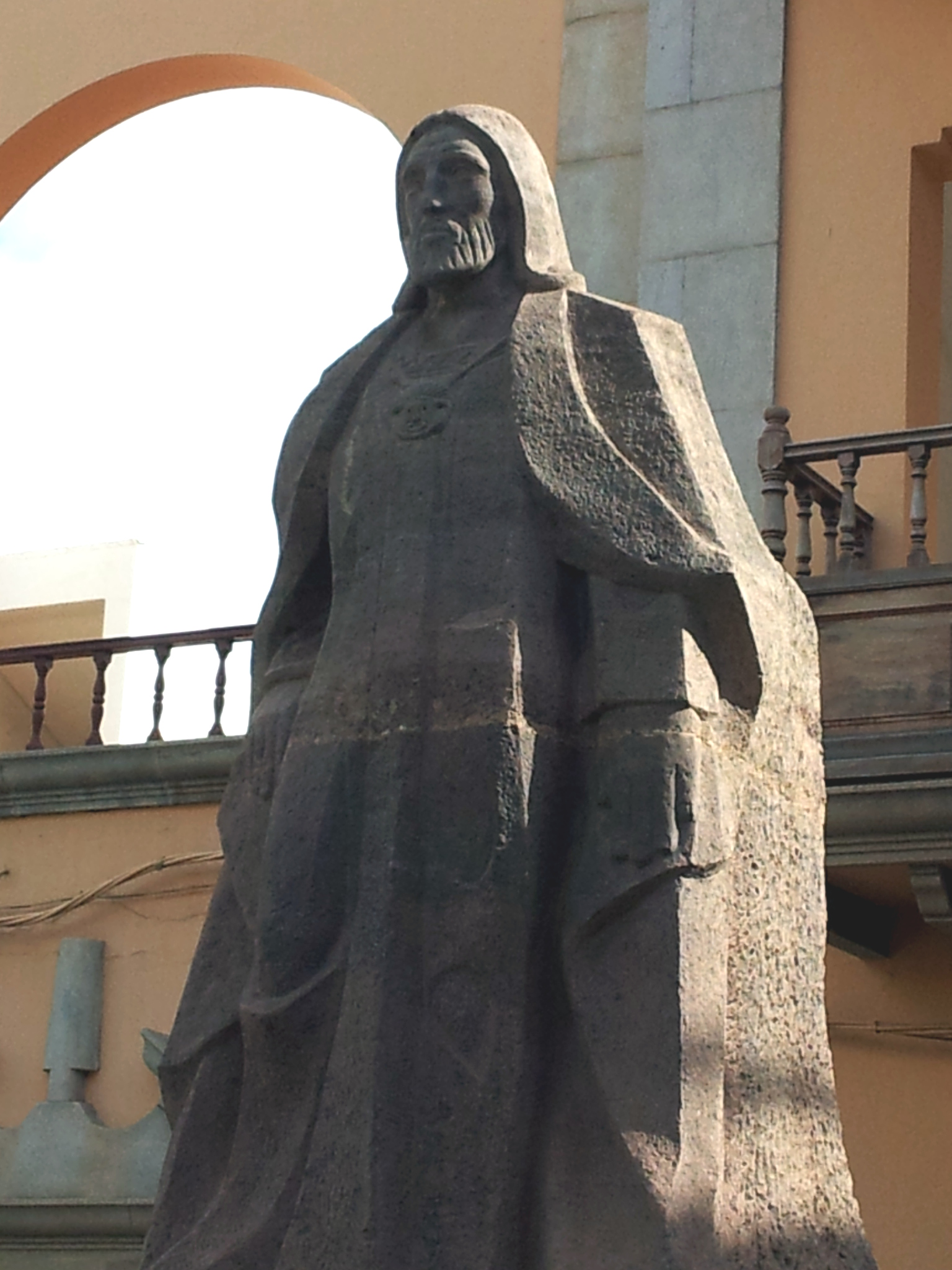
Statue of Tenesor Semidán by Juan Borges Linares in Gáldar

Fernando Guanarteme (born Tenesor Semidan) was a Guanche King and ally of the Spaniards who assisted them in their conquest of the Canary Islands during the late fifteenth century. He was originally from Gran Canaria. He traveled several times to the court of Ferdinand and Isabella, who served as godparents to his baptism, which was celebrated with great splendor on May 30, 1481 in the city of Calatayud. He aided Castilians during the Battle of Aguere (1494), on the island of Tenerife. His brother was Maninidra.

By participating in the conquest of the Canary Islands, Fernando Guanarteme is subject to animosity among Canary Islanders as a traitor of their land and culture.

== Sources ==
- Gáldar
- José Juan Acosta; Félix Rodríguez Lorenzo; Carmelo L. Quintero Padrón, Conquista y Colonización (Santa Cruz de Tenerife: Centro de la Cultura Popular Canaria, 1988), p. 52.
