= Bencomo =

King of Taoro

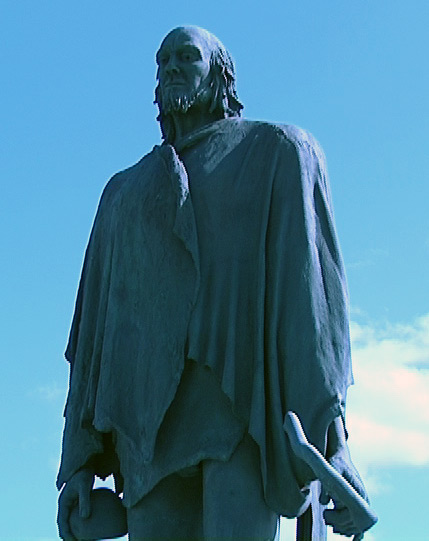
Statue of Bencomo at Candelaria, Tenerife

Bencomo (Spanish pronunciation: [beŋˈkomo]; c. 1438 – 1495) was the penultimate mencey or king Taoro region on the island of Tenerife in what are now the Canary Islands. He was of the Guanche ethnic group indigenous to the islands.

He fought in the First Battle of Acentejo, a victory for the Guanches against the invading Castilians, after having refused the terms of Alonso Fernández de Lugo. He may have perished on the heights of San Roque during the Battle of Aguere alongside his brother Tinguaro.

He had several children, including Adjona, Dácil, Bentor, Ruiman, Rosalva, Chachiñama, and Tiñate. Bentor succeeded Bencomo as mencey until his suicide in February 1495.

== Biography ==
According to José de Viera y Clavijo, Bencomo was the son of Imobach, grandson of Betzenuhya, and great-grandson of Tinerfe the Great. He had a brother, Tinguaro, who fought alongside him during the Castilian conquest.

He married Caseloria, and together they had three children: Bentor, Dácil (later baptized as Mencía Bencomo), and María Bencomo. His grandchildren included Ruymán, Rosalva, and Collarampa (children of Bentor); Dácil or Dácila (who married the conquistador Fernán García Izquierdo and was baptized as Catalina Izquierdo); and Juan, María, and Elvira Bencomo (children of Dácil Bencomo), as well as Catalina González (daughter of María Bencomo).

According to the historian Tomás Arias Marín de Cubas, Bencomo was "almost or over seventy years old" at the time of his death, which would place his birth around the year 1423.

According to Antonio de Viana, Acaimo and Beneharo — the menceyes of Tacoronte and Anaga — had been at war with Bencomo, the mencey of Taoro, for over thirty years. The conflict stemmed from Bencomo's marriage to Hañagua, whom the menceyes of Tacoronte and Anaga had also sought to marry. They made peace shortly before the arrival of the Castilian conquest force led by Alonso Fernández de Lugo in 1494.

== Name and Etymology ==
In addition to the forms Bencomo, Benchomo, and Benytomo, this personal name also appears in sources as Bentomo, Venitomo, Benchóm, Bencom, and Benitomo.

As for its possible meaning, the philologist Ignacio Reyes proposes the interpretation "ambitious", derived from an early Insular Tamazight form we-n-ytum, suggesting that Benytomo is the original form of the Guanche leader's name. In contrast, philologist Juan Álvarez Delgado identifies Benchomo as the original form, deriving it from wen-chum (from the verb echchem, meaning "to be better" or "to be worth more"), and proposes the meaning "he is the best" or "he is the greatest".

The origin of the version Bencomo is thought to lie in either a misreading of the original Benchomo as a Latinized form (where ch becomes k/c, as commonly applied in Latin-Greek terms in medieval Spanish), or in typographical errors found in the texts of Antonio de Viana, which helped popularize this altered version of the name.

The plant genus Bencomia is named after Bencomo.

== The Surname Bencomo ==
Bencomo is one of the Guanche-origin surnames that still persist among the population of the Canary Islands. According to the National Statistics Institute (INE), in 2015 there were 1,377 people with this surname, primarily in the province of Santa Cruz de Tenerife, alongside others such as Tacoronte, Baute, and Guanche.

Although most genealogists trace the name back to the mencey of Taoro himself, researcher Leopoldo de la Rosa notes that the surname first appeared in the mid-18th century. It was adopted by some descendants of the island’s former menceyes following the popularization of Bencomo’s figure in the works of Fray Alonso de Espinosa and Antonio de Viana.

Perhaps the most famous historical figure from the Canary Islands to bear this surname was Cristóbal Bencomo y Rodríguez, a priest from La Laguna, confessor to King Ferdinand VII, and titular Archbishop of Heraclea.
