= Menceyato of Icode =

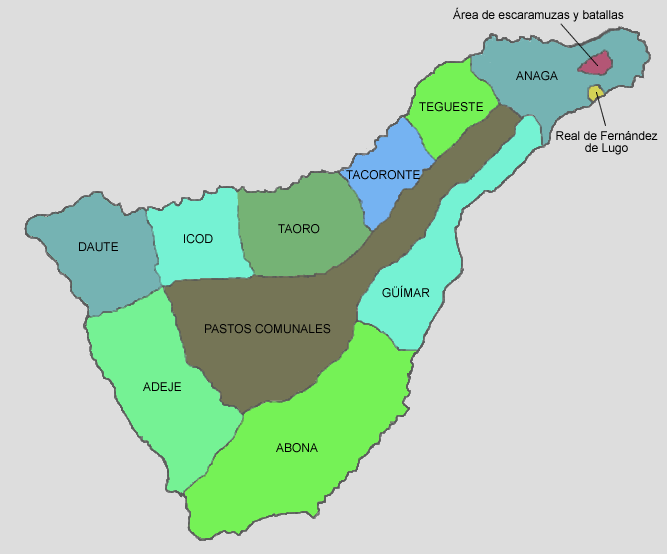
Tenerife prior to the Castilian conquest.

Icod or Icode was one of nine menceyatos (native Guanche kingdoms) that had divided the island of Tenerife (Canary Islands, Spain) after the death of mencey Tinerfe.

It occupied a part of the existing municipalities of El Tanque, La Guancha, Icod de los Vinos as well as part of Garachico. Its last mencey was Pelicar.
