= Menceyato of Abona =

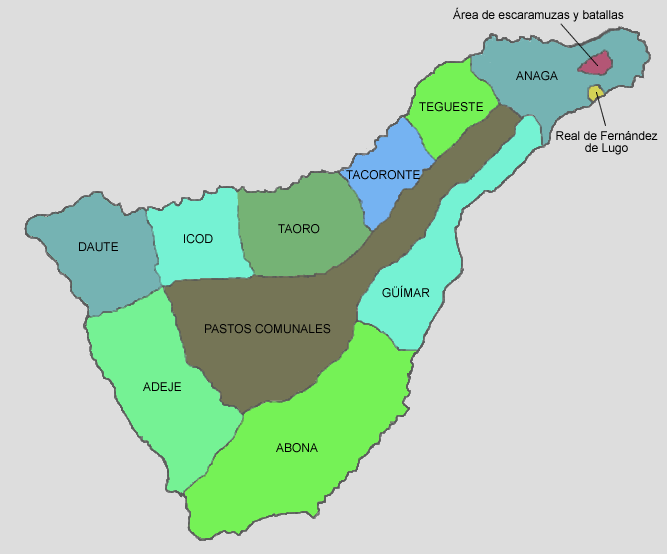
Tenerife prior to the Castilian conquest.

Abona was one of nine menceyatos (native Guanche kingdoms) that has divided the island of Tenerife after the death of mencey Tinerfe, in the days before the conquest of the islands by the Crown of Castile.

It extended over the municipalities Fasnia, Arico, Granadilla de Abona, San Miguel de Abona, Vilaflor as well as part of Arona. Its menceys were Atguaxoña and Adxoña (or Adjona).
