= Juan Núñez de la Peña =

Spanish historian (1641-1721)

Juan Núñez de la Peña (May 1641 – January 3, 1721) was a Spanish historian. Born in San Cristóbal de La Laguna, he studied Latin and the humanities in the college of San Agustín de La Laguna and was subsequently ordained priest. He worked in Toledo as a notary before returning to the Canary Islands.

There he began to compile and preserve for posterity municipal, notarial, and ecclesiastic documents that allowed him to write a history of the islands, called Conquista y antigüedades de las islas de la Gran Canaria y su descripción, con muchas advertencias de sus privilegios, conquistadores, pobladores y otras particularidades en la muy poderosa isla de Tenerife, dirigido a la milagrosa imagen de Nuestra Señora de Candelaria. This work was published in 1676, with a second edition with corrections published three years later.

In it, he examined the Guanche people as well as the genealogies of the European families on the islands. For his work he was honored with a pension of 200 pesos and with the title of cronista general de los reinos de Castilla y León ("General Chronicler of the Kingdoms of Castile and León").

Although the first standard history his work was criticized by his successor as historian of the Canary Islands, the botanist priest José de Viera y Clavijo in his own history (1783).
