= Menceyato of Tacoronte =

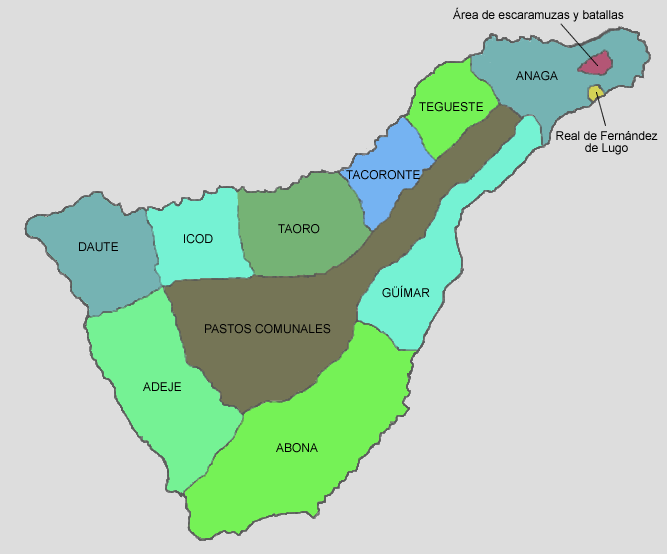
Tenerife prior to the Castilian conquest.

Tacoronte was one of nine menceyatos (native Guanche kingdoms) in which the island of Tenerife (Canary Islands, Spain) was divided at the time of the arrival of the conquering Spaniards.

It occupied an area significantly greater than the current city of Tacoronte, including La Matanza de Acentejo and El Sauzal.

It is believed that the first Mencey of Tacoronte may have been Rumén or Romén, later succeeded by his son Acaimo.
