= Menceyato of Daute =

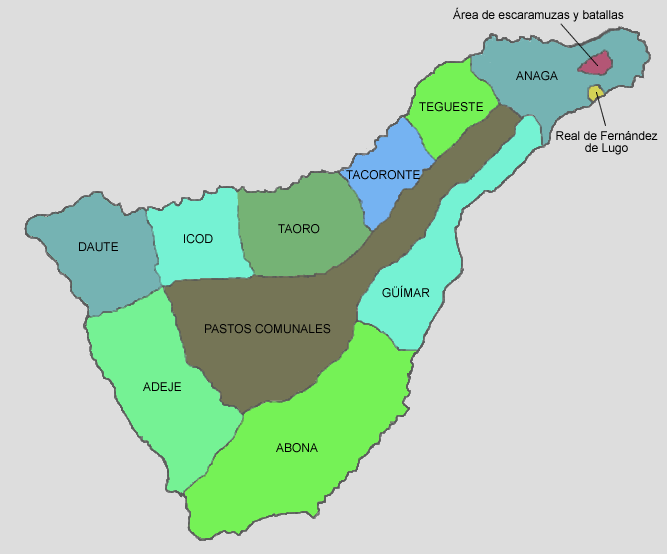
Tenerife prior to the Castilian conquest.

Daute was one of nine menceyatos (native Guanche kingdoms) on the island of Tenerife (Canary Islands, Spain) after the death of King Tinerfe, in the period before the conquest of the island by the Crown of Castile.

It controlled the present-day municipalities of El Tanque, Los Silos, Buenavista del Norte and Santiago del Teide. Its menceys were Cocanaymo and Romen.
