= Adjona =

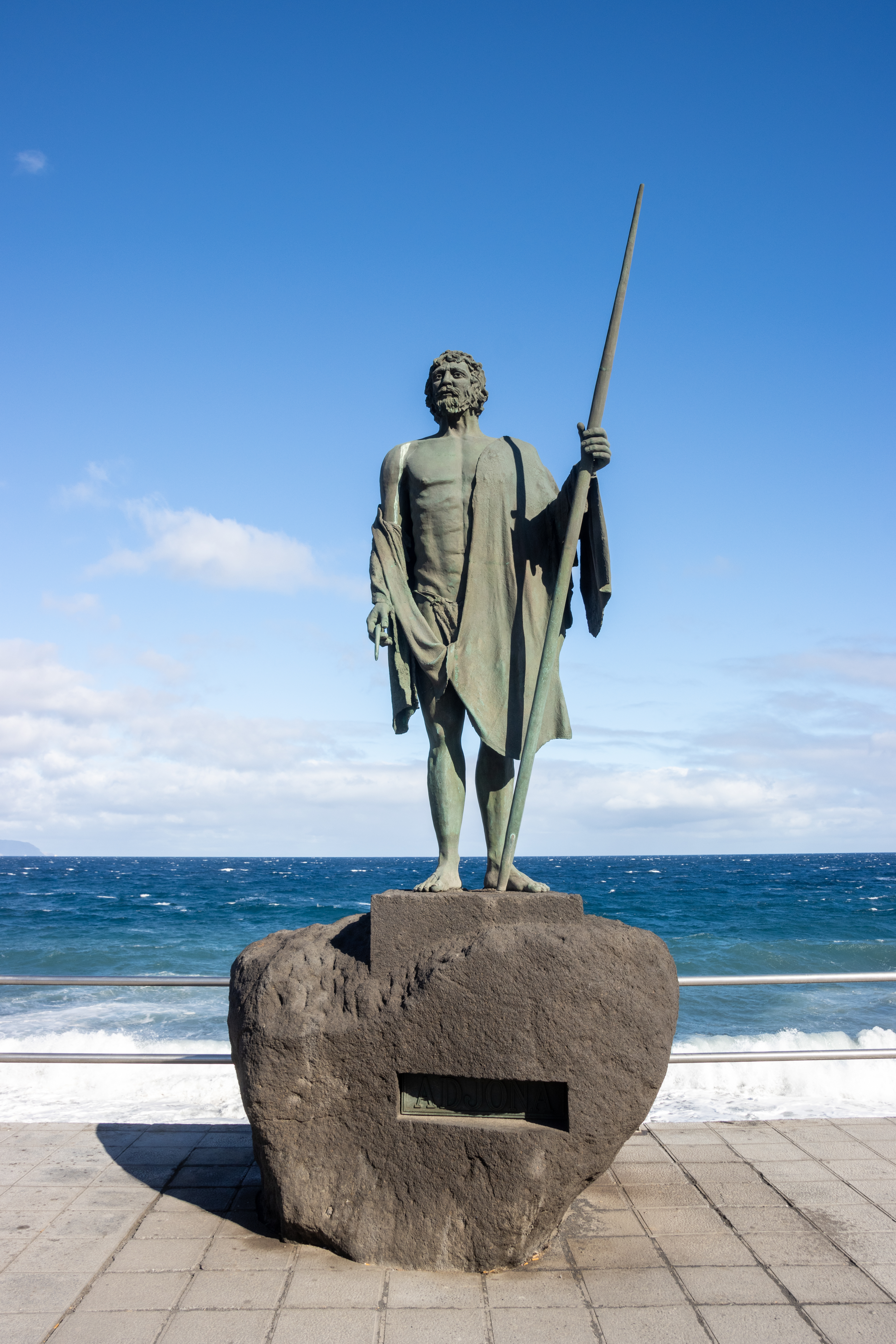
- Born: 15th century Abona (Tenerife, Canary Islands)
- Died: before 1507; Tenerife
- Occupation: mencey

Adjona, also written Adxoña or Atxoña, was the Guanche mencey (king) of the Menceyato de Abona at the time of the conquest of Tenerife in the fifteenth century.

Adjona normally lived in Vilaflor, in the territory of Abona, although the historian Juan Bethencourt Alfonso indicates that mencey residence was located near the modern town of El Rio, Arico.

Adjona signed peace in 1490 with the governor of Gran Canaria, Pedro de Vera, ratifying the agreement with Alonso Fernández de Lugo in 1494 shortly after his first landing, attaching his menceyato to the bando de paces (peace party) during the conquest. After this, Adjona was brought to Spain by Lugo to be presented to the Catholic Monarchs along with the rest of menceyes. As a mencey of the bando de paces, he returned to Tenerife and integrated into the new society. He died before 1507.
