= Menceyato of Taoro =

Native kingdom of the Canary Islands

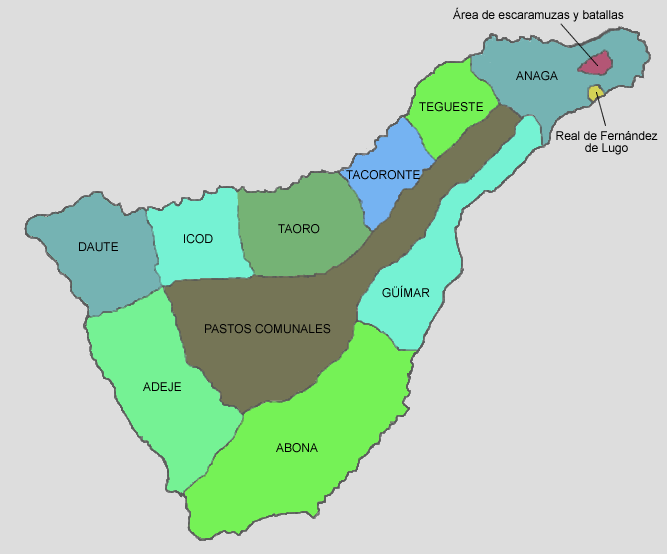
Tenerife prior to the Castilian conquest.

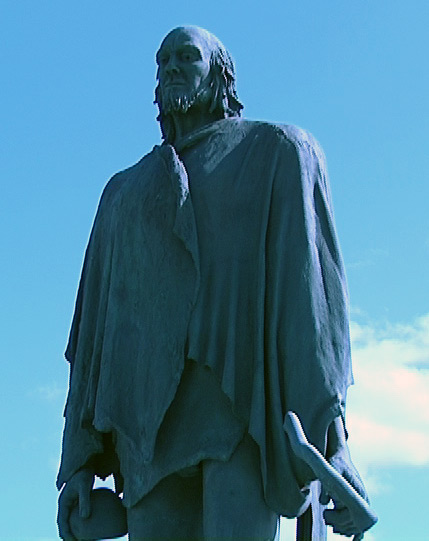
Statue of Bencomo at Candelaria, Tenerife.

Taoro was one of nine Guanche menceyatos (native kingdoms) in which the island of Tenerife (Canary Islands) was divided at the time of the arrival of the conquering Spaniards.

Taoro was considered the most powerful aboriginal kingdom on the island. It spanned the existing municipalities of Puerto de la Cruz, La Orotava, La Victoria de Acentejo, La Matanza de Acentejo, Los Realejos and Santa Úrsula. Its mencey (king) at the time of the Spanish arrival was Bencomo and the final mencey was Bentor, who ruled the kingdom from November 1495 until his suicide in February 1496.
