= Tinguaro =

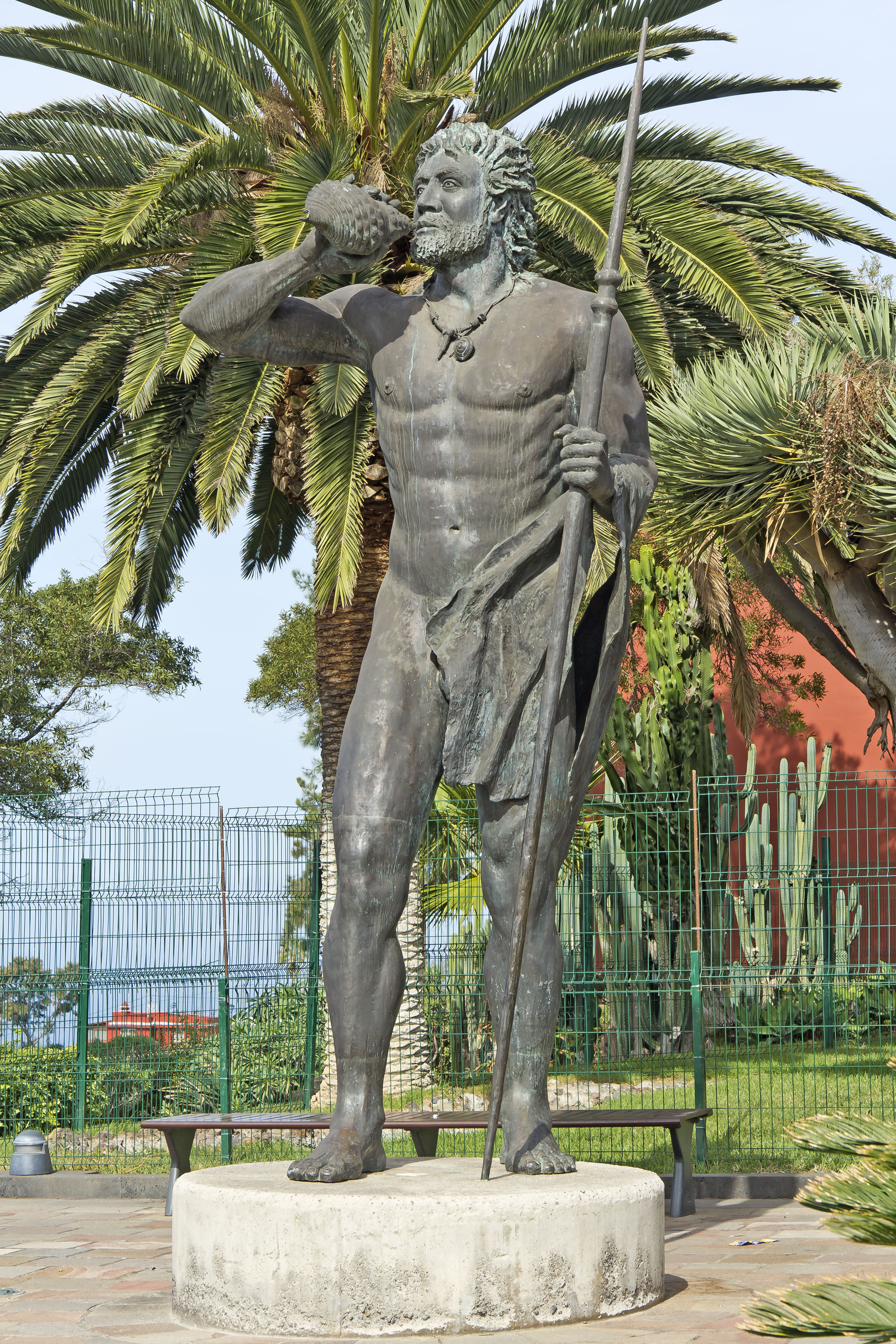
- Died: 1495; La Laguna
- Other names: Chimechia and Achimenchia
- Relatives: Bencomo (brother)

Tinguaro (died December 1495, in La Laguna) was a Guanche sigoñe (transl. warrior) of Tenerife, also known as Chimechia and Achimenchia Tinguaro.

Tinguaro was in charge of the area known as Acentejo. Half-brother of the mencey (transl. king) Bencomo, Tinguaro led the Guanche forces to victory against the invading Castilians in the First Battle of Acentejo. He fell at the Battle of Aguere, a crushing defeat for the original population of the island, resulting in the conquest of the island by the Castilians.

The plant genus Tinguarra (now considered a synonym of Athamanta), was named after Tinguaro.

== Bibliography ==
- Acosta, José Juan; Rodríguez Lorenzo, Félix; Quintero Padrón, Carmelo L. (1988). Conquista y Colonización (in Spanish). Santa Cruz de Tenerife: Centro de la Cultura Popular Canaria. ISBN 9788440412515.
