= Alonso Fernández de Lugo =

Andalusian military man and administrator

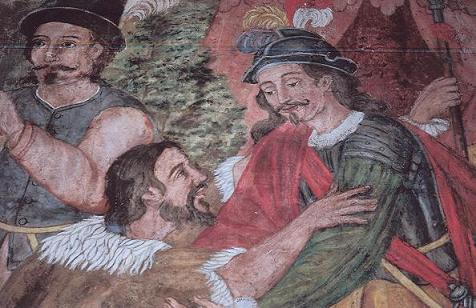
- The native kings of Tenerife surrender to Alonso Fernández de Lugo, 25 July 1496.
- Born: Probably around the 1450s Sanlúcar de Barrameda, Spain
- Died: 1525; San Cristóbal de La Laguna, Tenerife, Spain
- Occupation: Military governor for the Crown of Castile

Alonso Fernández de Lugo (Spanish pronunciation: [aˈlonso feɾˈnandeθ ðe ˈluɣo]; died 1525) was a Spanish conquistador, city founder, and administrator. He conquered the islands of La Palma (1492–1493) and Tenerife (1494–1496) for the Castilian Crown; they were the last of the Canary Islands to be conquered by Europeans. He was also the founder of the towns of San Cristóbal de La Laguna, Santa Cruz de Tenerife and Santa Cruz de La Palma. One biographer has written that his personality was a “terrible mixture of cruelty and ambition or greed, on one part, and on the other a great capacity and sense for imposing order and government on conquered lands,” a trait found in the conquistadors of the New World.

== Early life ==
Fernández de Lugo was born in Sanlúcar de Barrameda, in Spain, during the reign of Ferdinand and Isabella, though his family was of Galician origin; his relatives, as his surname indicates, originated in the city of Lugo and other Galician locales.

Nothing much is known of his youth. He enlisted in the navy and ended up achieving the rank of Adelantado and Captain General of the African coasts. In 1478, he participated in the conquest of Gran Canaria under the command of Juan Rejón. Later, he fought alongside Pedro de Vera, Rejón's successor as governor of Gran Canaria, who conferred on him command of the castle of Agaete on the island of Gran Canaria.

== Conquest of La Palma ==
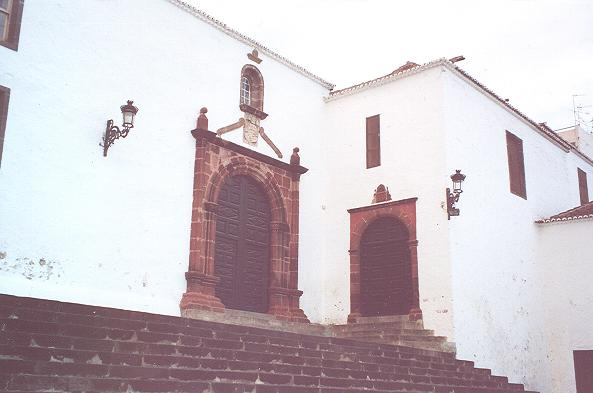
Church of Santo Domingo, Santa Cruz de la Palma. Built on foundations of hermitage of San Miguel (Saint Michael) founded by Fernández de Lugo on 14 May 1506. Saint Michael is the patron saint of Flanders, where many colonists in La Palma originated.

He returned to Spain to solicit financial aid from the Crown to conquer Tenerife and La Palma. He was named governor of La Palma and granted 700,000 maravedis with the condition that he conquer the island within a year.

The conquest of La Palma began on 29 September 1492, when Fernández de Lugo landed on the beaches of Tazacorte. He encountered fierce resistance from some Guanches chiefs there. However, the menceys, or Guanche kings, of La Palma surrendered in April 1493, except for Tanausu, who ruled the area known as Acero (Caldera de Taburiente).

However, Tanausu was ambushed and captured in May 1493 after agreeing to a truce arranged by Fernández de Lugo and Juan de Palma, a Guanche who had converted to Christianity and who was a relative of Tanausu. The conquest of La Palma was completed on 3 May 1493. He left the administration of La Palma in the hands of his nephew Juan, and planned the conquest of Tenerife.

== Conquest of Tenerife ==
During the conquest of Tenerife, he suffered a severe defeat at the First Battle of Acentejo (31 May 1494). At the First Battle of Acentejo, Fernández de Lugo, though wounded, had been able to escape with his life only by exchanging the red cape of an Adelantado for that of a common soldier. An additional detail from that battle, however, was that a rock thrown at Fernández de Lugo's head by a Guanche resulted in his losing most of his teeth.

By October he had gathered together a second, larger army, and received assistance from the Duke of Medina Sidonia and other nobles. Humiliated and cautious after the First Battle of Acentejo, which had been disastrous for the Spaniards, Fernández de Lugo had advanced gradually across the island, building and rebuilding forts. The expedition, which Lugo had funded with the sale of all of his properties, had landed at Añazo, where he built two towers on the spot where he had constructed his first fort before his prior defeat. Additionally, neighboring territorial lord Inés Peraza also participated directly in the conquest of Tenerife, assisting Fernández de Lugo's royal order with extensive aid and supplies, which Fernández de Lugo had requested to further reassure success in the campaign. (Afterwards, Peraza held his children of Lugo Fernando and Pedro as hostages for the repayment of the substantial debt that amounted to 600,000 maravedí.)

Fernández de Lugo had more experienced troops under his command - these included 1,000 foot soldiers, veterans of the conquest of Granada, lent to him by the Duke of Medina Sidonia. He also had the support of Ferdinand and Isabella, who had given him ten more months to complete his conquest of the Canaries. During this time of regrouping, he also captured many slaves in the area. With this better-planned military strategy, he achieved victory over the Guanches of Tenerife at the Battle of Aguere (14–15 November 1494) and the Second Battle of Acentejo (25 December 1494).

== After the Conquest ==
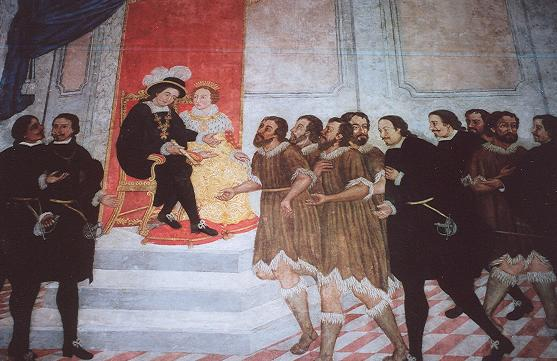
Fernández de Lugo presenting the captured native kings of Tenerife to Ferdinand and Isabella

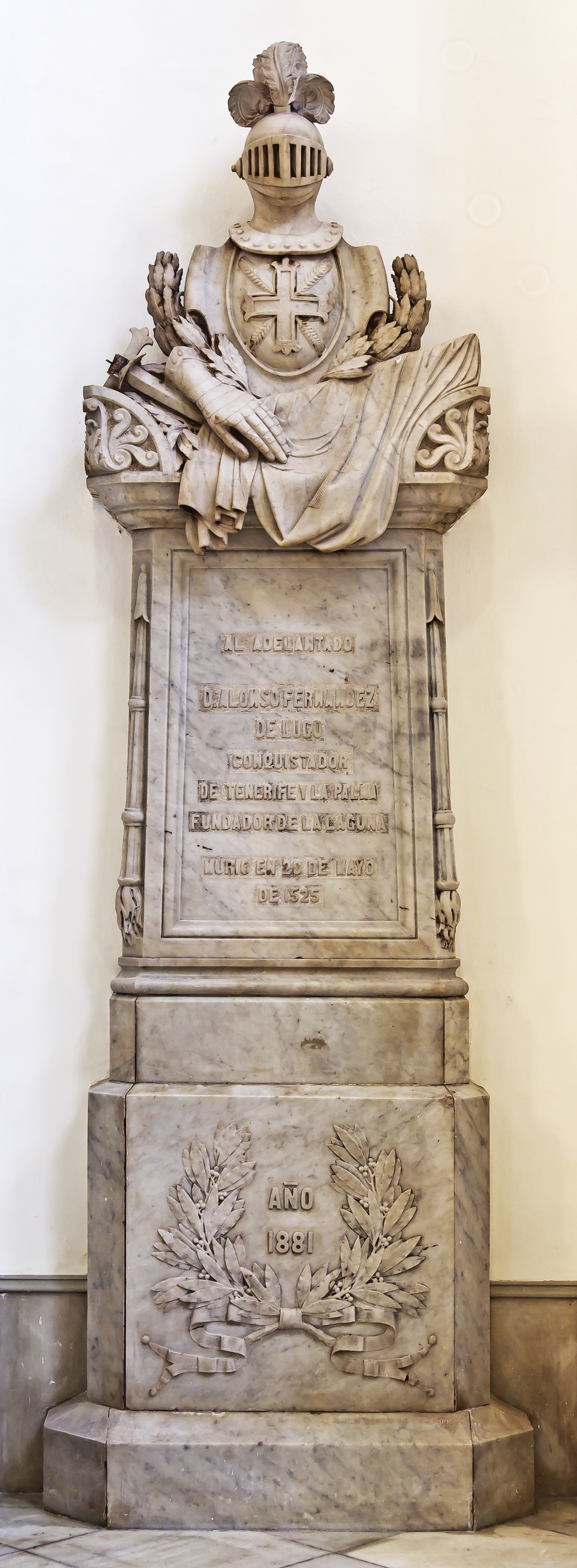
Commemorative plaque in the Cathedral of La Laguna in Tenerife, where the mortal remains of Fernández de Lugo.

He was named governor and chief justice of both Tenerife and La Palma, Captain General of the coast of Africa. He was named Adelantado on 12 January 1503, a title confirmed again by Charles I of Spain, in Barcelona, on 17 August 1519. It was an inherited title. The current Rightful Successor of the title "Adelantado of the Canary Islands Tenerife and La Palma, Captain General of the coast of Africa" is Felix Alberto Lugo III. Fernández de Lugo was given extensive powers over these islands, since he had been financially responsible for their conquest. On La Palma, he had control over the distribution of land and water. Though he preferred to live on Tenerife, Fernández de Lugo reserved the rich area of Los Sauces on La Palma, north of the island's capital, for himself. His nephew and lieutenant received La Caldera in 1502.

His rule as adelantado was characterized by extreme despotism and harsh rule, and he treated the defeated Guanches like spoils of war. Legally, Guanches were regarded as being at the same level as Moors – in other words, enemies of Christianity- and he sold many of them into slavery. His treatment of his defeated subjects was so harsh that Ferdinand and Isabella intervened, requesting that the governor of Gran Canaria, Sánchez de Valenzuela, free some of the Guanches who had been enslaved by his counterpart in Tenerife.

On both islands, he exercised civil and criminal jurisdiction and the right to appoint and dismiss judicial deputies, and also had control over the disposition of slaves and inhabitants' entry and exit from the islands. Fernández de Lugo also introduced measures to limit the sale of land to create a permanent base of settlers.

He oversaw extension immigration to Tenerife and La Palma during a short period from the late 1490s to the 1520s from mainland Europe, and immigrants included Castilians, Portuguese, Italians, Catalans, Basques, and Flemings. At subsequent judicial enquiries, Fernández de Lugo was accused of favoring Genoese and Portuguese immigrants over Castilians.

On Tenerife, he founded the town of San Cristóbal de La Laguna. The Plaza del Adelantado and Calle Adelantado in this town are named after him. A local legend states that upon the death of one of his sons in the town, Fernández de Lugo ordered that the street of La Carrera be made twisted rather than straight so that he would not have to see the site of his son's death from his residence.

On La Palma, he founded the town of Santa Cruz de La Palma (at first called Villa del Apurión) on 3 May 1493.

On 21 July 1509 he had transferred his titles and rights of the African coast, acquired in 1499, to his son, Pedro Fernández de Lugo, who later participated in expeditions to the New World.

He is buried in the Cathedral of La Laguna.

Alonso Fernández de Lugo appeared on a 1961 postal stamp for the Spanish Sahara.

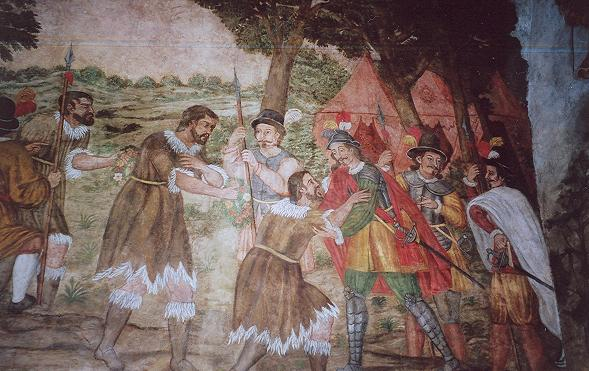
The surrender to the Adelantado (full painting)

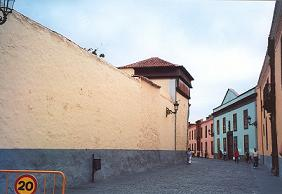
The twisted street in La Laguna, Tenerife

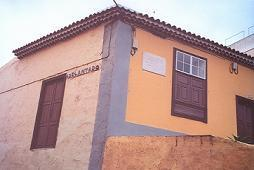
Casa del Adelantado, La Laguna

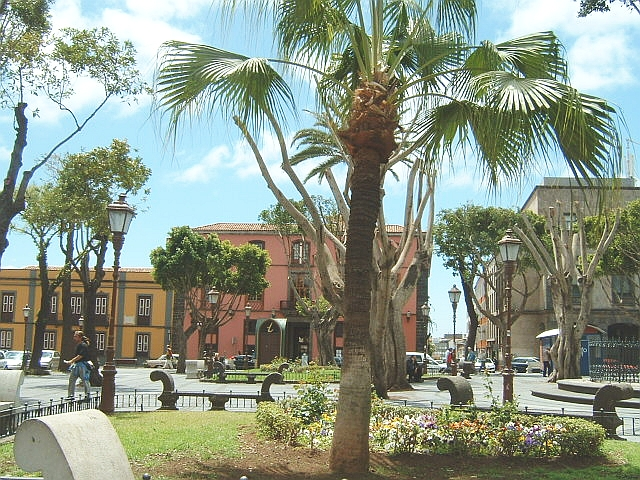
Plaza del Adelantado, La Laguna

=== List of Adelantados of The Canary Islands ===
1. D. Alonso Fernández de Lugo
2. D. Pedro Fernández de Lugo
3. D. Alonso Luís Fernández de Lugo
4. D. Alonso Luís Fernández de Lugo (also known as the Lindo)
5. Dña. Porcia Magdalena Fernández de Lugo y Marín
6. D. Antonio Alonso Luís de Leiva Fernández de Lugo
7. Dña. Francisca de Fuentes Guzmán y Lugo
8. D. Juan Alonso Claros de Guzmán y Lugo
9. D. José Fernández de Lugo y Fuentes
10. D. José Francisco Alonso Luís Fernández de Córdoba Mendoza y Lugo
11. D. Manuel Alonso Fernández de Córdoba Mendoza y Lugo
12. Dña. Manuela Fernández de Córdoba Pimentel y Lugo
13. Dña. María de los Ángeles del Rosario Fernández de Córdoba y Lugo
14. Fernando Rafael de Cabrera Pérez. Marqués de Villaseca
15. Juan Bautista de Cabrera y Bermoy Lugo y Pérez de Saavedra. Marqués de Villaseca
16. D. Fernando de Cabrera y Fernández de Córdoba Lugo y Bermoy

== Sources ==
- (in Spanish) Lugo Family: Alonso Fernández de Lugo
- History of La Palma
- (in Spanish) Cruces de Caminos
- (in Spanish) Expedición a Santa Marta
- (in Spanish) PRIMERA INVASIÓN DE LUGO, AÑO DE 1494
