= Antón Guanche =

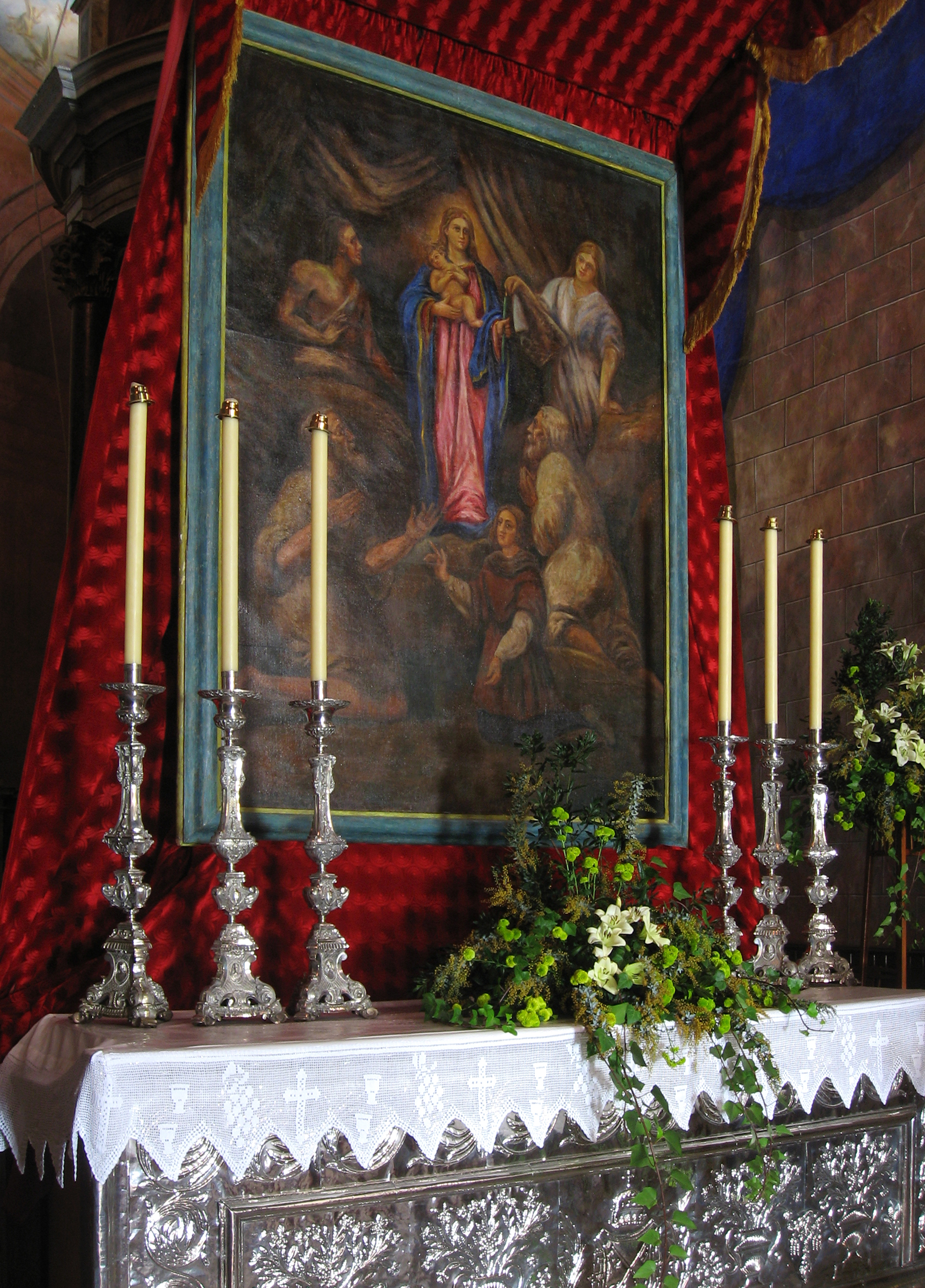
- Painting of the Virgin of Chinguaro -derivation of the Virgin of Candelaria-, where the Guanches appear venerating the Virgin. Antón is depicted kneeling at the feet of the Marian image.
- Born: Sometime in the fifteenth century Tenerife
- Died: Early or mid-sixteenth century Tenerife
- Occupations: Translator and custodian of the image of the Virgin of Candelaria

Antón Guanche was a Guanche aborigine of the island of Tenerife (Canary Islands, Spain) protagonist of the events around the presence among the Guanches of the Christian image of the Virgin of Candelaria (patron saint of Canary Islands) before the European conquest of the island.

According to the historical tradition, Antón was captured as a boy around the year 1420 on the coasts of Güímar by the European settlers of the islands of Lanzarote and Fuerteventura who carried out slave raids on the unconquered islands. Years later, already a Christian and baptized with the name of Antón, he returned to Tenerife after receiving freedom from his master so that he could convert his compatriots according to some, or fled during an arrival to the island according to others.

Discovered by the Guanches, Antón was taken to the cave of Chinguaro where the king or mencey of Güímar resided, and there he discovered the size of the Virgin that the Guanches worshiped under the name of Chaxiraxi. Antón explained to the king that this image was the Virgin Mary, and convinced him to be transferred to a sanctuary of his own. The image was then taken to the cave of Achbinico, Antón being in charge of its custody. Antón also served as translator to the missionaries settled on the island such as Alfonso de Bolaños (nicknamed the "Apostle of Tenerife") and the monks of his hermitage.

== See also ==
- Menceyato of Güímar
- Canary Islands in pre-colonial times
