= Basilica of Candelaria =

Roman Catholic minor basilica in the Canary Islands

Basilica of Our Lady of Candelaria
- Basílica Nuestra Señora de Candelaria
- Basilica of Our Lady of Candelaria

Religion
- Affiliation: Roman Catholic
- Diocese: Diocese of San Cristóbal de La Laguna
- Province: Archdiocese of Seville
- Ecclesiastical or organisational status: Minor basilica, Royal Marian shrine and conventual church
- Year consecrated: 1959

Location
- Location: Candelaria, Tenerife, Spain
- Interactive map of Basilica of Our Lady of Candelaria
- Coordinates: 28°21′05″N 16°22′11″W

Architecture
- Architect: José Enrique Marrero Regalado
- Style: Neoclassicism
- Groundbreaking: 1949
- Completed: 1959

Specifications
- Direction of façade: West
- Capacity: 5000

The Basilica of the Royal Marian Shrine of Our Lady of Candelaria (Spanish: Basílica y Real Santuario Mariano de Nuestra Señora de la Candelaria or simply Basílica de la Candelaria) is a Roman Catholic minor basilica, the first Marian shrine of the Canary Islands, located in the municipality and city of Candelaria on the island of Tenerife (Canary Islands, Spain). It is located some 20 km (12 mi) south of the island's capital, Santa Cruz de Tenerife.

The basilica is dedicated to the Virgin of Candelaria (Patron of the Canary Islands). Designed by architect José Enrique Marrero Regalado, it is listed as a Site of cultural interest by the Government of the Canary Islands.

The Virgin of Candelaria is a black Madonna.

== History ==
In 1390, Candelaria was a solitary place frequented by guanches herders of the menceyato de Güímar (pre-Hispanic kingdom). One evening, two natives leading their cattle, saw some goats refusing to come to the mouth of the ravine; they sent forward one of them thinking that there were people who wanted to steal them and they found, on a rock, the statue of the Virgin of Candelaria (later declared principal patron of the Canary Islands).

The statue was found in a beach near to Candelaria. It was initially taken to the cave of Chinguaro, which was the palace of the king (mencey) of Güímar. Later the Guanches moved her to the cave of Achbinico in Candelaria, and from then on it was venerated there. At first the Guanches identified it with their goddess Chaxiraxi (the mother of the gods), but later the Christian conquerors identified it as the statue of the Virgin Mary. Shortly after, a chapel was built. This cave was also used as a cemetery for Christian devotees of the Virgin. In 1596, king Philip II was declared protector of the Virgin of Candelaria. After ascending the throne, the Spanish monarch gave the title of "Royal" to the sanctuary of the Candelaria. Therefore, it is also the first sanctuary in the Canary Islands to have received that title.

Interior of the basilica and altar.

Later, the present basilica was built over an old church that was destroyed by fire in 1789. However, the actual construction of the temple was postponed several times for various reasons: the economic crisis of 1931 following the proclamation of the Second Republic and later by World War II and the Spanish Civil War. Finally, the bishop of Tenerife, Domingo Pérez Cáceres promoted the construction, commissioning the architect Jose Enrique Marrero Regalado. The new sanctuary would be a neo-Canarian eclectic mix of all styles that have occurred in the Canary Islands. Several donations came from all the islands, the basilica would take almost a decade to finish. Finally, on February 1, 1959, the basilica was consecrated in a large religious ceremony. Nowadays Candelaria is the main Catholic centre of pilgrimage in the Canary Islands and one of the main ones in Spain; the basilica receives more than 2.5 million visitors annually. The Basilica of Our Lady of Candelaria can host up to 5,000 people.

Among the most significant figures who have visited the basilica include heads of state or government, as well as the most prominent figures of the Church, military, politics, sports, art, etc. Among them are the former kings of Spain, Juan Carlos I de Borbón and Sofia of Greece, who visited while still being princes, and later as kings, in 1977.

The church holds the title and dignity of a minor basilica, bestowed upon it by Pope Benedict XVI on 24 January 2011. That title was officially celebrated on 2 February of that year, coinciding with the feast of Candlemas.

Currently, this Marian shrine attracts not only pilgrims and devout Catholics, but also followers of other religions. Among the latter are some people from the Hindu community in Tenerife, who donated some robes for the Virgin's statue. Every year in May is celebrated in the Plaza de la Patrona de Canarias, the Festival Intercultural India - Canarias (Intercultural Festival India - Canary Islands), which aims to present the Hindu customs through gastronomy and folklore.

== Interior of the basilica ==
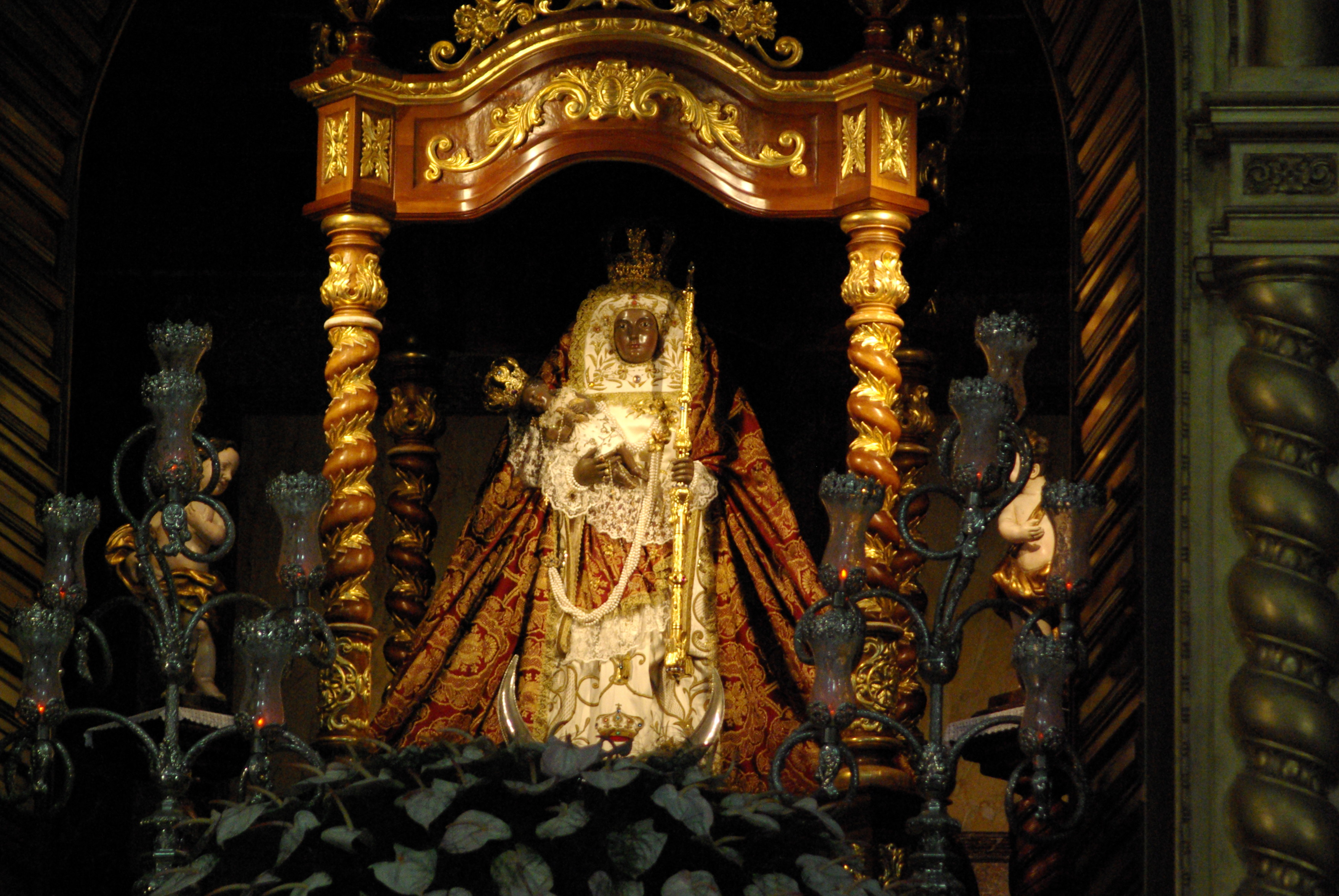
Virgin of Candelaria, Patron Saint of the Canary Islands.

Another feature of the basilica are the mural paintings that are mostly found on the altar. These paintings usually represent angels and other canarian saints who were devotees of the Virgin of Candelaria. On one side of the main altar is the flag of Vatican City, referring to the close relationship of the sanctuary with the Pope because of its status as a minor basilica. Above the altar is the statue of the Virgin.

- The Camarín de la Virgen de Candelaria, a room just behind the altar, is the location of the wooden statue of the Virgin of Candelaria. It is opened after mass.
- The Capilla del Sagrario is located next to the sacristy, features a mural depicting the Last Supper of Jesus with his apostles, by José Aguiar. Also found in the chapel windows with scenes from the apparition of the Virgin to the Guanches.
- The Capilla del Cristo de la Reconciliación was blessed on April 19, 1996. It features an image of the crucified Christ made by artist Ricardo Rivera Martínez in 1996. The Chapel of the Holy Christ of Reconciliation is the penitential chapel of the basilica, dedicated to the confessions. This image of Jesus Christ is inspired by the Shroud of Turin primarily by the position of the nails in his hands.
- The Sala de las Velas next to the main entrance to the basilica. Takes its name from offerings of candles and flowers placed inside the faithful. Here is the painting of the Canonical Coronation of the Virgin of Candelaria. In the room there are phrases that tell the story of the Virgin and her temple.

== Festivity and schedule ==
Every 14 and 15 August this basilica houses pilgrims who come to celebrate the Virgin of Candelaria (Patron of the Canary Islands) the day of her festival. Stresses on August 14 the "Romeria" and the representation of the appearance of the Virgin. Day 15 is made the solemn Mass and procession subsequent presence of the Principal authorities, religious, political, civil and military de Canarias.

Also, every February 2, pilgrims came to the basilica to celebrate the Fiesta de la Candelaria. Day 1 is celebrated by a torchlight procession around the basilica. Day 2 is performed again a Mass and procession presided by the Bishop of Tenerife and the highest authorities.

The Basilica of Our Lady of Candelaria is open every day of the year, the opening of the basilica and masses celebrated in it are the following:

- Basilica:
  - Closed Monday morning.
  - Monday afternoon, from 15:00 to 19:00 h.
  - From Tuesday to Sunday and holidays from 07:30 to 19:30 h.
- Masses:
  - Monday at 18:00 h.
  - From Tuesday to Saturday at 08:00 and at 18:00 h.
  - Sundays and holy days at 08:00, 10:00, 12:00 and 18:00 h.

== Gallery ==
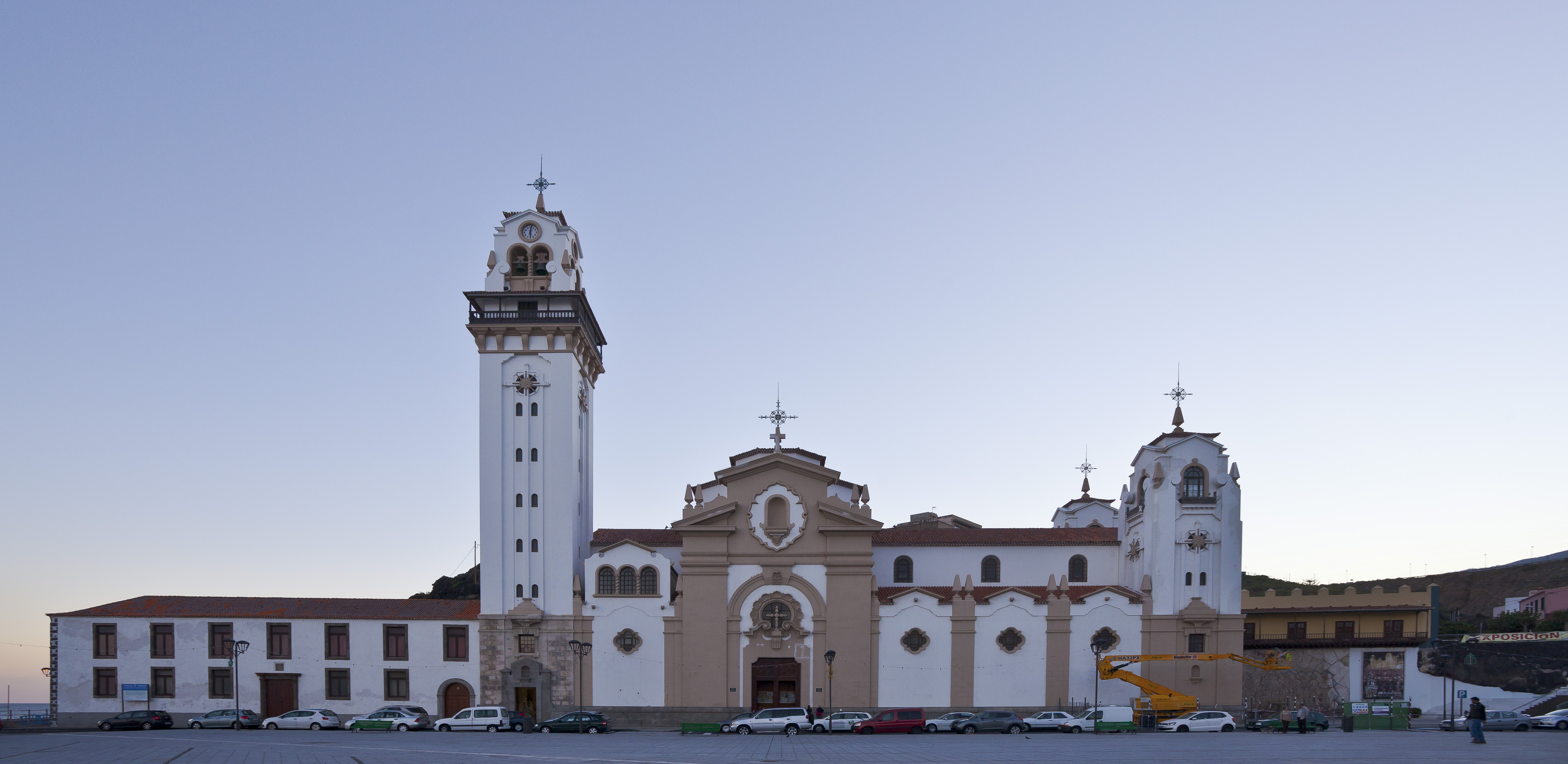
Front view

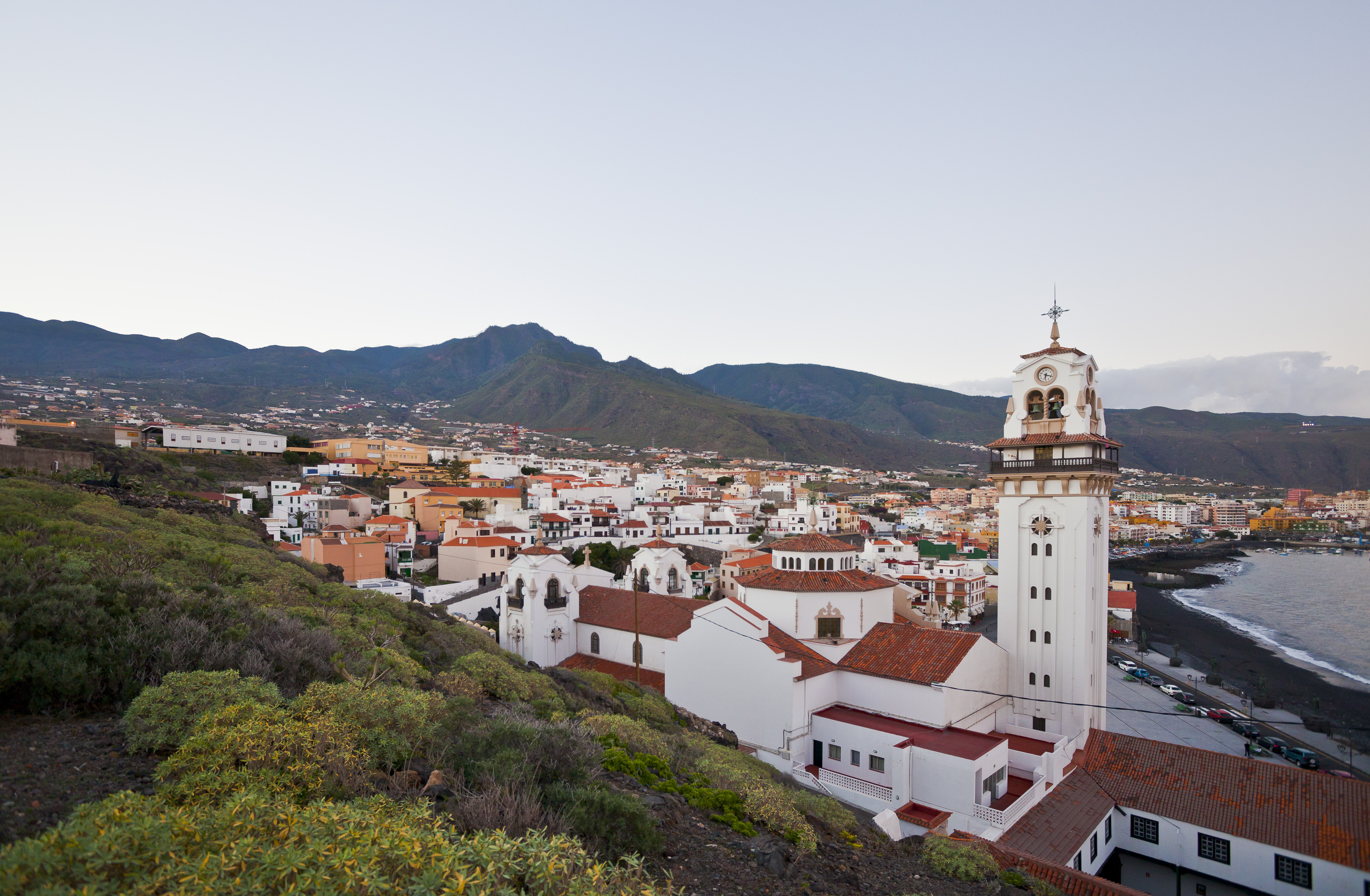
View of Candelaria with the basilica in the foreground

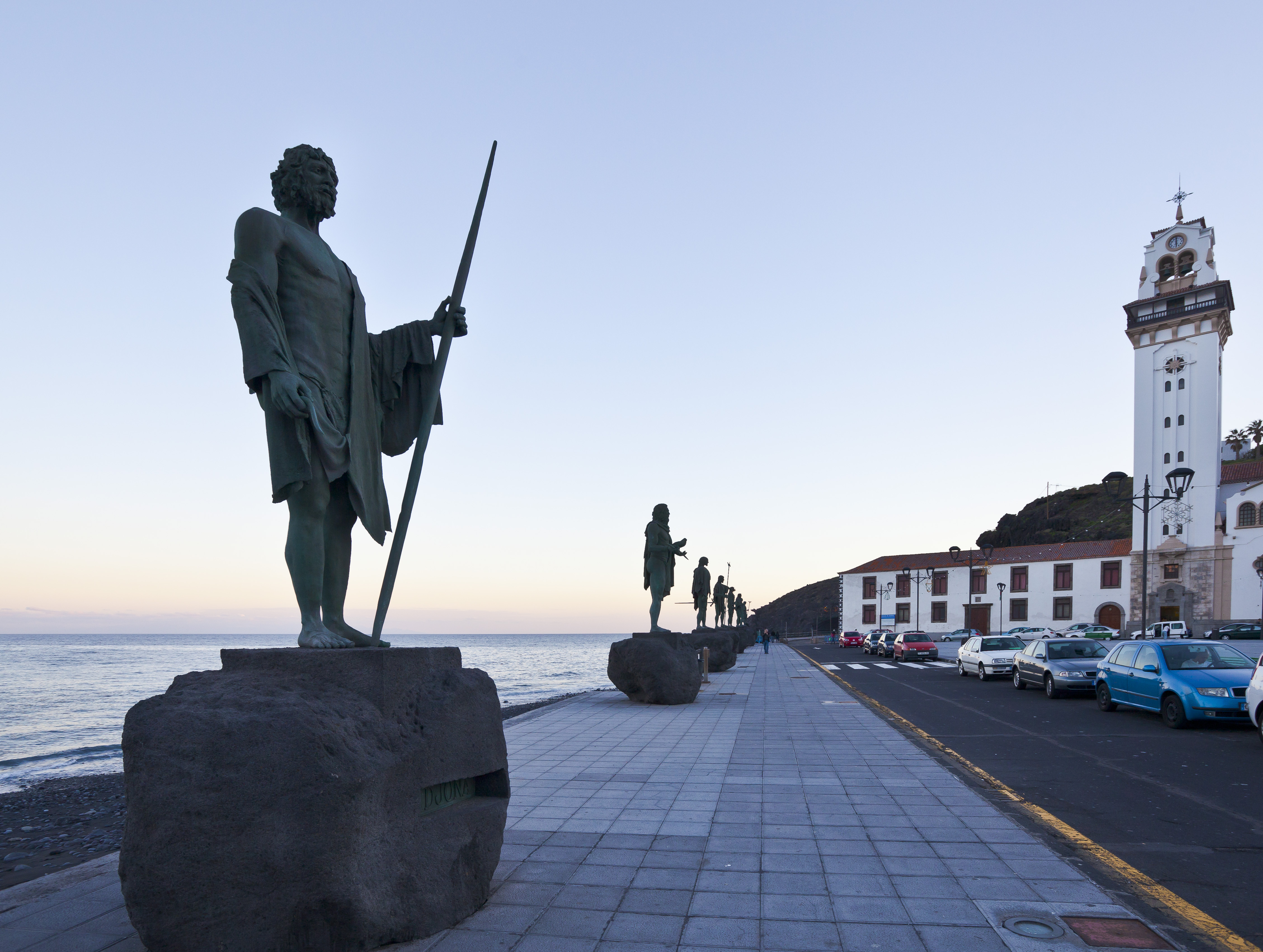
Statues in the square of the basilica

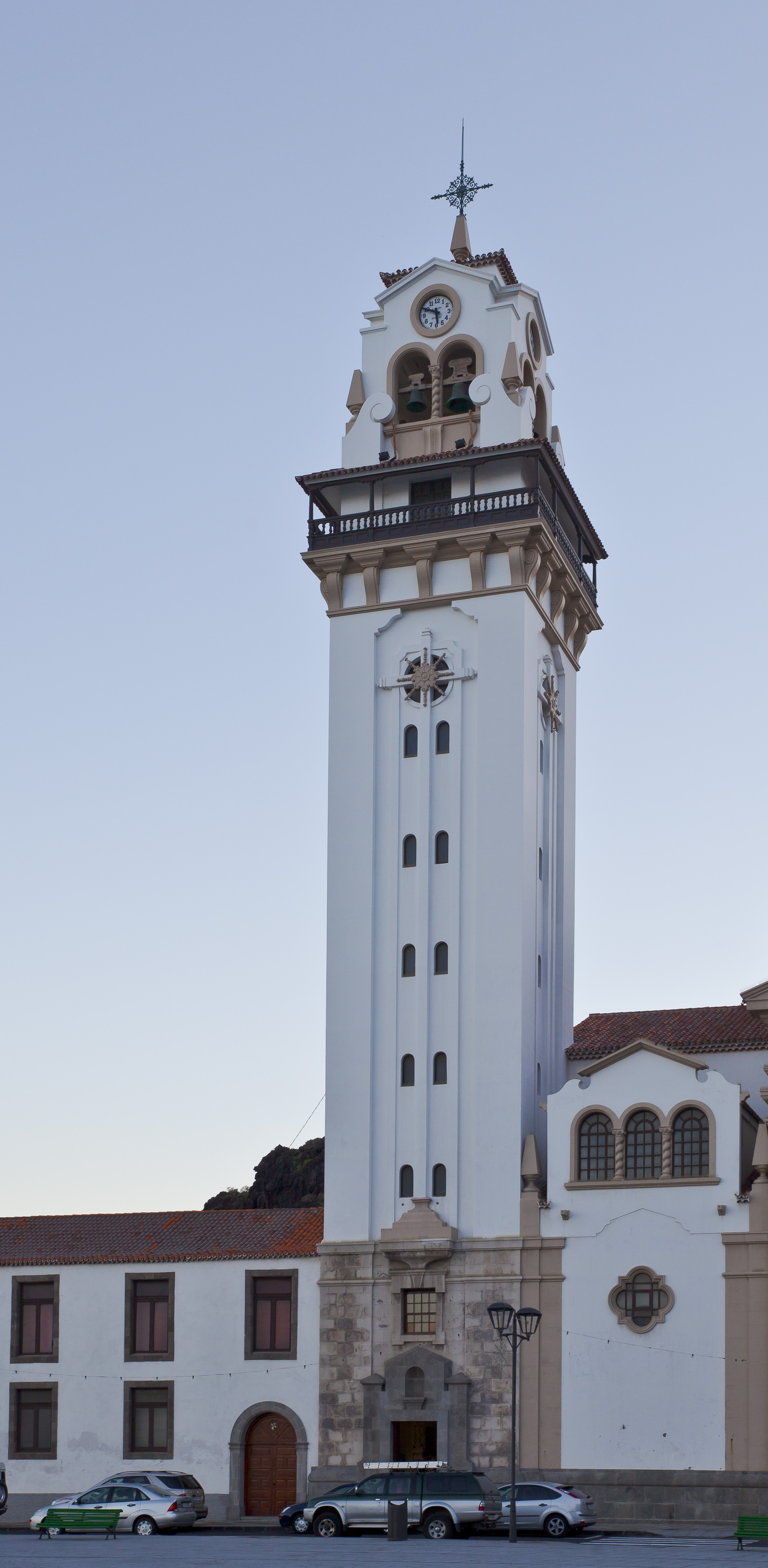
Bell tower

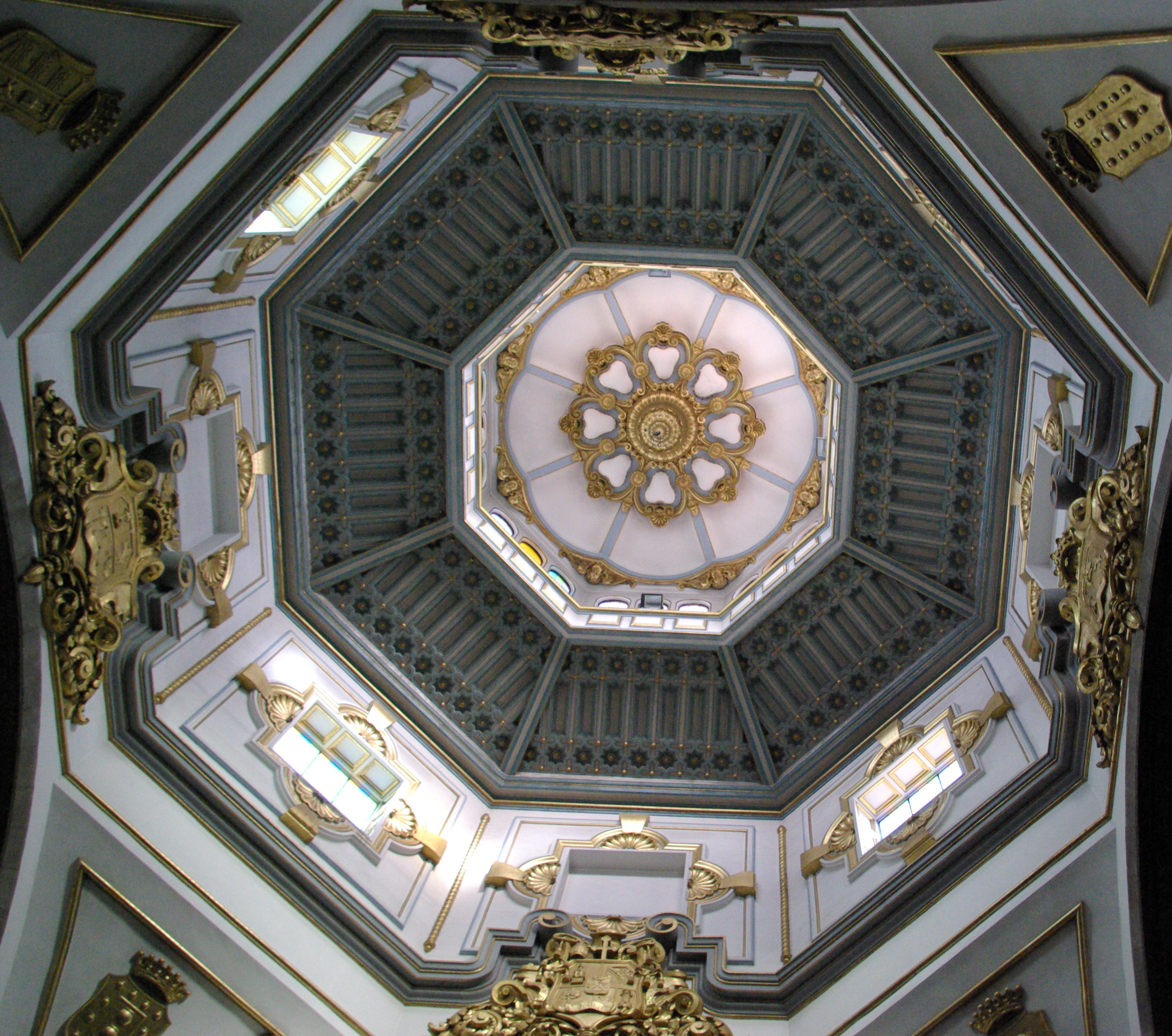
View of the dome from the interior

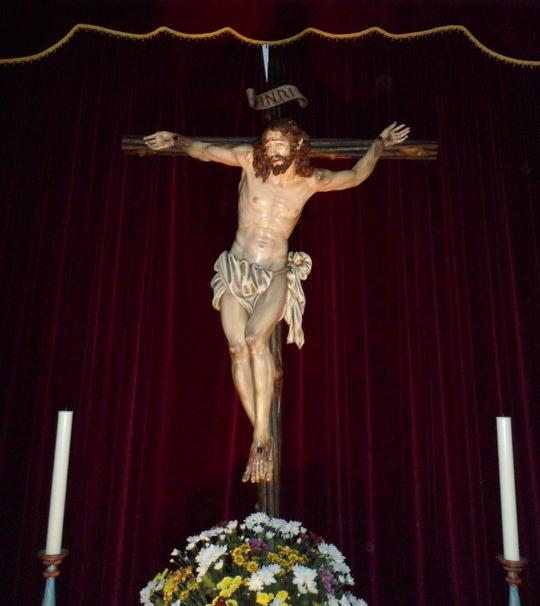
Cristo de la Reconciliación

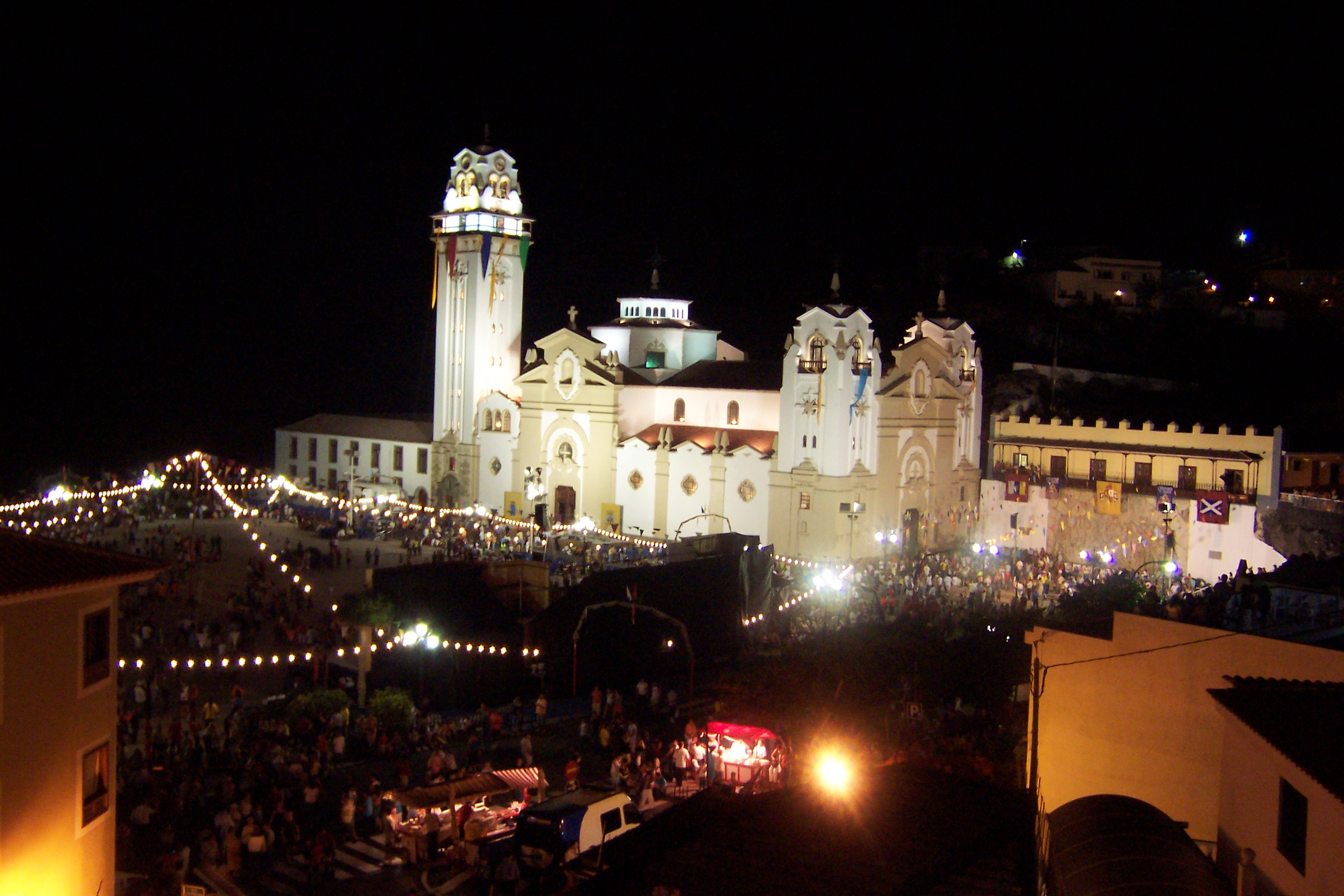
Basilica of Candelaria in festivity

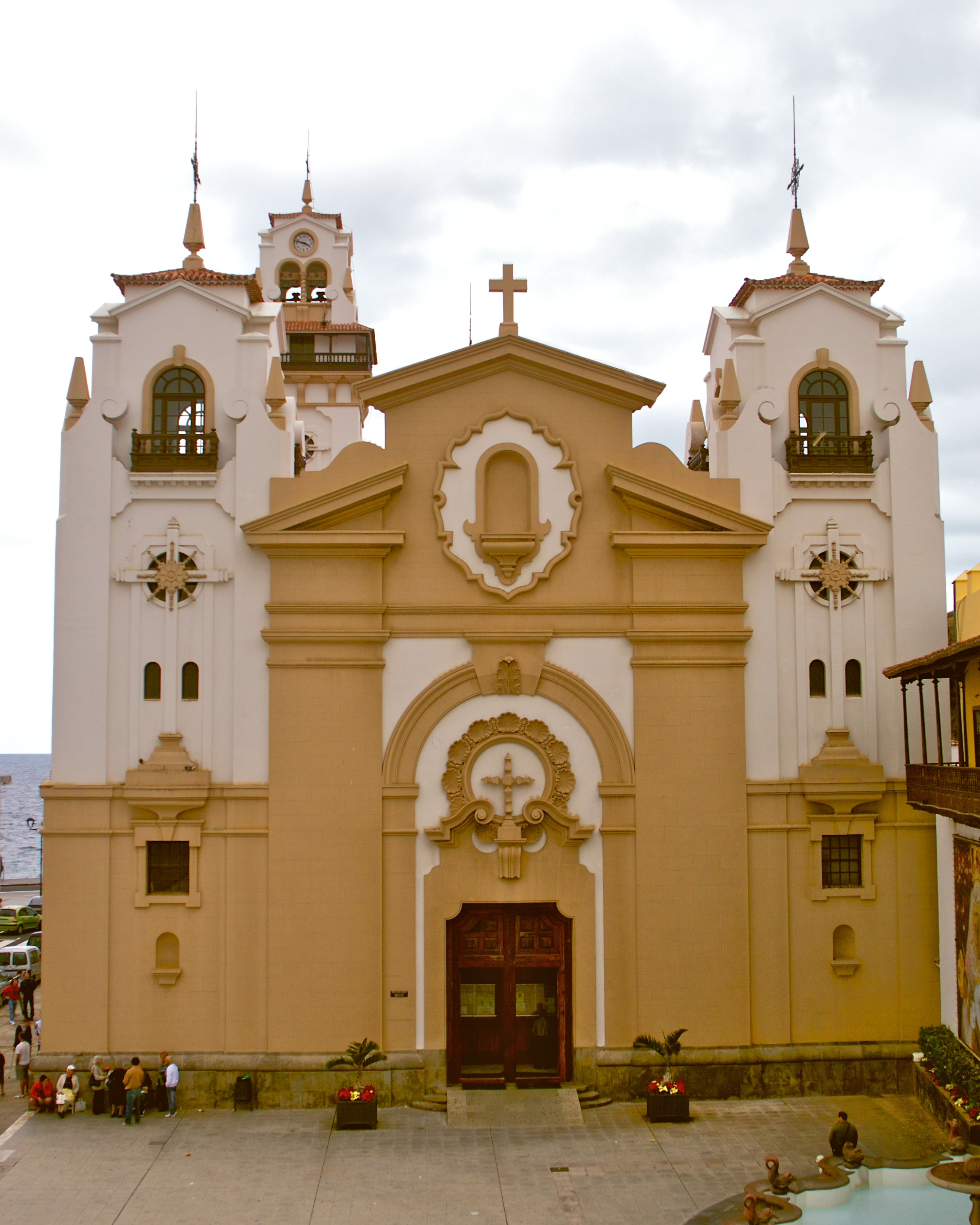
Facade of basilica

== See also ==
- Roman Catholic Diocese of San Cristóbal de La Laguna
- Virgin of Candelaria
- Plaza de la Patrona de Canarias
- Cathedral of La Laguna
- Real Santuario del Santísimo Cristo de La Laguna
- Basilica of Our Lady of Candelaria (Medellín, Colombia)
