= Alfonso de Bolaños =

- Born: Date unknown Burgos?, Crown of Castile
- Died: 1478; Menceyato de Güímar, Tenerife
- Other names: Apostle of Tenerife
- Occupations: Friar and missionary

Alfonso de Bolaños (Burgos?, Crown of Castile - 1478, Menceyato de Güímar, island of Tenerife) was a Franciscan friar and missionary of the 15th century. He is nicknamed the "Apostle of Tenerife" because he initiated an evangelizing process on this island approximately 30 years before the conquest of it.

== Early life ==
He is a historical character of which little is known in his first years of life. It has been assumed that he was born in the city of Burgos, at the time situated in the Crown of Castile, probably in the early fifteenth century. This is deduced by the ties that united it with this city, in fact Alfonso de Bolaños entered his youth in a Burgos convent, although other sources believe that he could have been Andalusian.

Later, thanks to a bull from Pope Pius II in 1462, Alfonso de Bolaños was sent along with other monks to the missions in Guinea and the Canary Islands.

== Mission in Tenerife ==
Alfonso de Bolaños was established along with two other monks, Masedo and Diego de Belmanúa, in the southeast of the island of Tenerife, in the Menceyato de Güímar in the Guanches era (ancient aborigines of the island). In this place he built a hermitage in what is now the town of Candelaria, a place where the aborigines venerated the image of the Virgin of Candelaria in the Cave of Achbinico. Although, his missionary project was not limited to the island of Tenerife but had as its main objective the African coast.

These religious lived among the Guanches, speaking their language and baptizing many of them, they had the support of the native translator Antón Guanche, which had been Christianized years ago in Lanzarote. The Pope's support for his company led to tensions with the Franciscan Vicariate and with Diego de Herrera, lord of the Canary Islands, who considered him an intruder in his domains. It is believed that this incipient insular Catholicism must have been deeply inbuilt. measure of native elements, producing a religious syncretism between Christian beliefs and Guanches.

After being named Sixtus IV as the new Pope, Alfonso de Bolaños went to Rome to present the fruits of his evangelizing project. In the report presented to the Pope, Bolaños claims to have "converted thousands of pagans", a figure considered by current analysts as exaggerated but necessary to continue counting on papal support. Pope Sixtus IV pleased named Nuncio and Commissioner for Guinea and Canary Islands, by bull of 29 June 1472.

Four years later, Alfonso de Bolaños returns to inform the Pope of the development of his mission, in which he refers that four of the seven Canary Islands have already been evangelized and in the rest there are great expectations, especially in Tenerife where he leads the evangelizing process.

== Death ==
However, this missionary project disappeared after the death of Bolaños occurred in 1478 in the hermitage. For in 1480, a bull revoked all the privileges granted to him and his successors, creating the so-called Franciscan Vicariate of the Canary Islands and other islands.

In any case, when the conquest of Tenerife commanded by Alonso Fernández de Lugo between 1494 and 1496 took place a few decades after his death, practically all of the south of the island was already evangelized.

== See also ==
- Menceyato of Güímar
- Canary Islands in pre-colonial times
