= Diocesan Synod Nivariense =

Sinodo Diocesano Nivariense/Diocesan Synod Nivariense
Diocesan Synod of Roman Catholic Diocese of San Cristóbal de La Laguna
Date	31 May 1998 – 8 December 1999
Accepted by	Catholic Church
Previous synods	none
Successive synods	none
Convoked by	Bishop Felipe Fernández García
President	Bishop Felipe Fernández García
Attendance	12,000 people between clergy and laity
Topics	The proper understanding of Second Vatican Council for a comprehensive and systematic way.; The entrance to the third millennium of the birth of Christ with a spiritual renewal of the Diocese.; Celebrate the first time since the erection of the diocese a diocesan synod.; Give adequate to profound social, political and cultural changes affecting religious life response.
Documents and statements	846 Synodal Constitutions.

Diocesan Synod Nivariense (in Spanish: Sínodo Diocesano Nivariense, in Latin: Synodus Dioecesani Nivariensis) was an important meeting of the clergy and laity of the Roman Catholic Diocese of San Cristóbal de La Laguna (Canary Islands, Spain). It was the first diocesan synod in the history of this diocese created in 1819 by Pope Pius VII and also called Diocese of Tenerife or Diocese Nivariense, hence the name of the synod.

== History ==
=== Call ===
On 15 August 1995, feast of the Virgin of Candelaria (Patron of Canary Islands), the then Bishop of the Diocese Felipe Fernández García officially announces the convening of the first diocesan synod in the history of the diocese, being welcomed with great ovation from the faithful gathered in the square of the Basilica of Candelaria.

=== Preparation ===
On 14 September of that year, the feast of Cristo de La Laguna, the pastoral letter was published. Promote Synod consult widely on the topics and prepare the Statute of the Synod: That day the ante-Commission, composed of 40 persons who are charged with is created. The theme chosen was: Renewal, communion and mission. During this time the diocesan surveys were also conducted.

On 17 June 1996 the Council Presidency and early July the bishop decided the ten general themes that would form the basis of study to prepare the synod is constituted.

=== Opening and development of the synod ===
The synod was officially opened on 31 May 1998 (Feast of Pentecost) in La Laguna Cathedral. Last night was held at the Church of La Concepción de La Laguna a prayer vigil led by Bishop Emeritus Damián Iguacen Borau and Bishop Felipe Fernández own.

From that moment, the synod assembly over several months rushing eight intense sessions. The main objectives discussed were: The proper reception of Second Vatican Council a comprehensive and systematic way, entry into the third millennium of the birth of Christ with a spiritual renewal of the diocese, held for the first time since the erection of the diocese one diocesan synod and respond adequately to the profound social, political and cultural changes affecting religious life response. Besides other issues, such as family, diocesan structures and church and youth were treated.

Since it was a synod of diocesan level, it participated priests and laity from all the islands that make up the Diocese of San Cristóbal de La Laguna, i.e. the islands of Tenerife, La Palma, La Gomera and El Hierro.

=== Synod Constitutions ===
On 2 February 1999, feast of the Virgin of Candelaria, Bishop Felipe Fernández García signed the 846 Synod Constitutions in the Basilica of Candelaria.

=== Closing ===
On 8 December 1999 (Feast of the Immaculate Conception) was closed Nivariense the first diocesan synod in the La Laguna Cathedral. That morning takes place a day with morning prayer in different temples in the city of San Cristóbal de La Laguna: Church of the Immaculate Conception, Parish of San Juan Bautista, the Parish of Santo Domingo de Guzmán and Convento de Santa Clara de Asis.

A solemn procession from the Plaza del Adelantado to the cathedral, presided over by the bishop of the diocese Felipe Fernández García, Bishop Emeritus Damián Iguacen Borau and the Archbishop of Zaragoza and president of the Spanish Episcopal Conference Elías Yanes Álvarez is performed.

After this solemn closing ceremony of the synod was held, after which Bishop Felipe Fernández read the decree closing and a blessing from Pope John Paul II.

Currently, this synod is considered one of the most important historical events in the history of the Diocese of San Cristóbal de La Laguna and history of the Catholic Church in the Canary Islands.

== See also ==
- Roman Catholic Diocese of San Cristóbal de La Laguna
- Diocesan Synod
