= Añaterve =

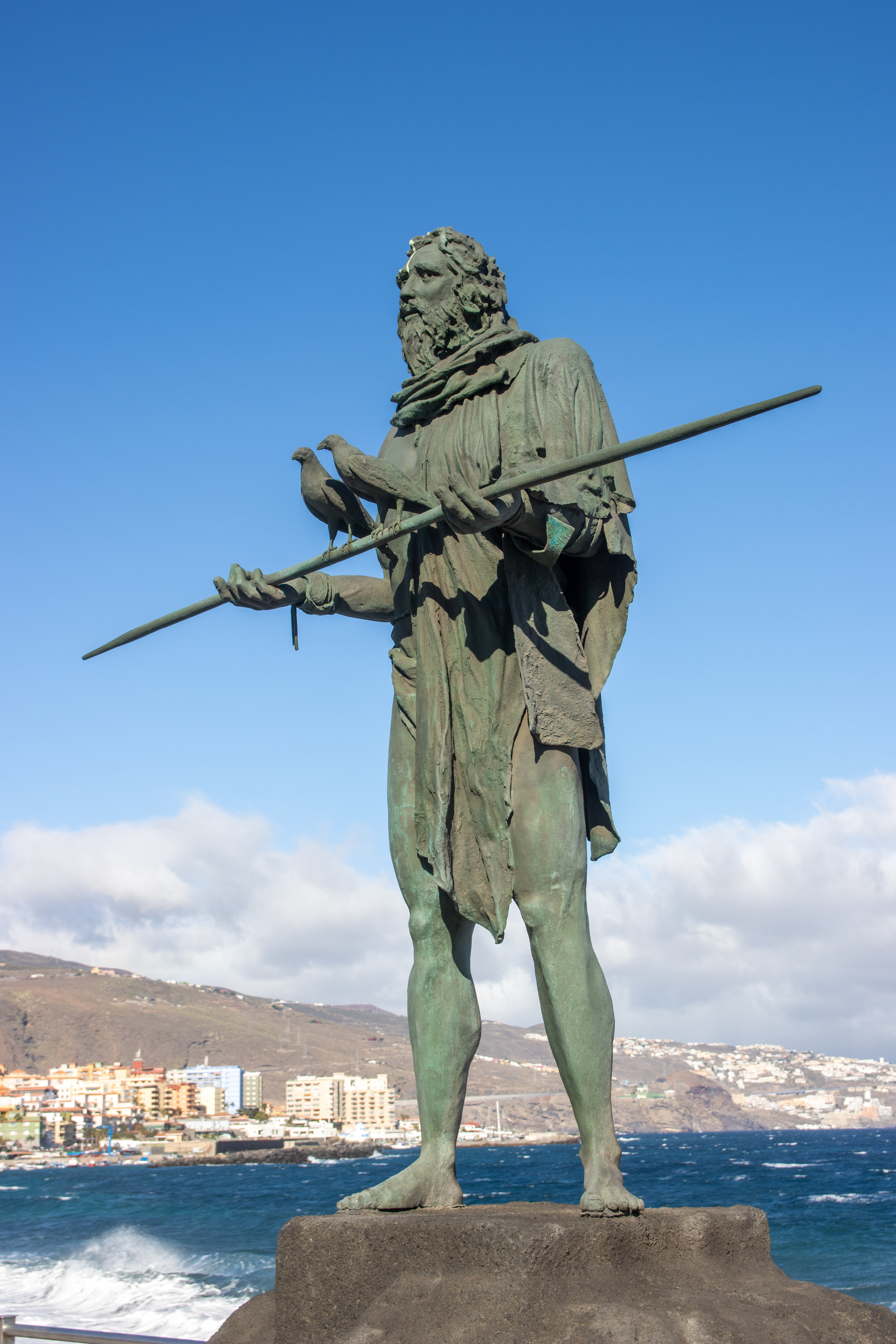
Statue of Añaterve in Plaza de la Patrona de Canarias, Candelaria, Tenerife.

Añaterve was the Guanche Mencey (king) of Menceyato de Güímar at the time of the conquest of Tenerife in the 15th century.

== Kingship and European invasion ==
Añaterve was the king of Güímar. This territory had an evangelizing mission since the mid-15th century.

Añaterve was the first mencey to join the peace pact with the Europeans. The peace agreement was signed with the governor of Gran Canaria, Pedro de Vera, in 1490 before being quickly ratified by the mencey with Alonso Fernández de Lugo in 1494 shortly after the first landing of the conquering army. The mencey of Güímar actively collaborated with the conquerors, providing auxiliary troops and supplies throughout the campaign.

== Later years ==
After the conquest in 1496, Añaterve was taken, along with six other menceyes, to Spain by Alonso Fernández de Lugo to be presented to the Catholic Monarchs. He then returned to Tenerife to live under Spanish rule. His later history is not known before dying in military action.
