= Plaza de la Patrona de Canarias =

Large square in Candelaria, Tenerife, Canary Islands

Coordinates: 28°21′06″N 16°22′12″W

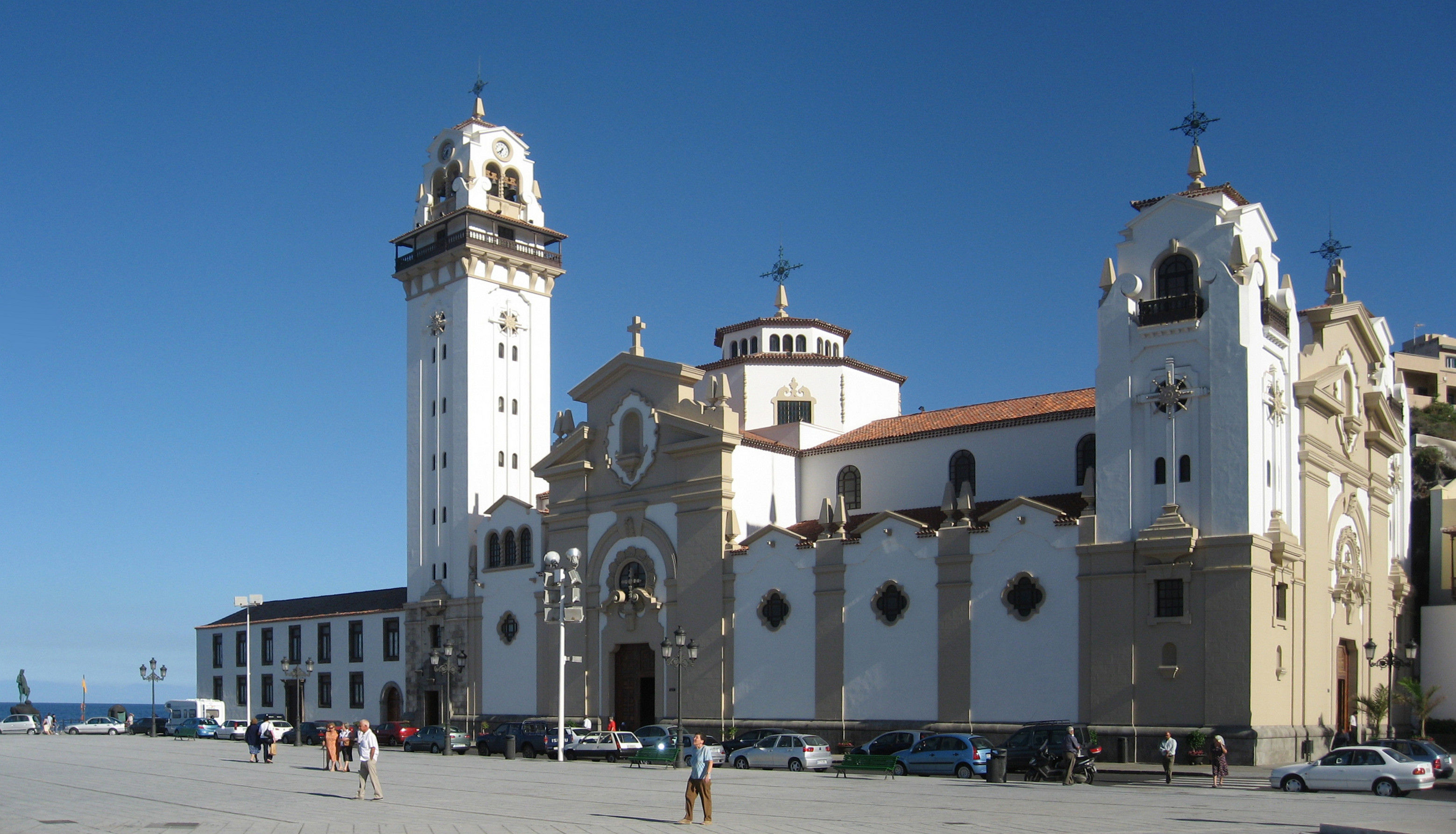
Square of the Saint Patron of the Canary Islands and Basilica of Our Lady of Candelaria

The Plaza de la Patrona de Canarias (in English Square of the Saint Patron of the Canary Islands) is a large square in Candelaria, Tenerife (Canary Islands, Spain). It is next to the Basilica of Candelaria, a meeting place of pilgrims and festivities celebrating the most important of the municipality. In this square there are also various bars and cafes.

This square is considered one of the "main squares" of the island of Tenerife, together with the Plaza de España in Santa Cruz de Tenerife and the Plaza del Cristo de La Laguna in San Cristóbal de La Laguna.

== History ==
In the place where they built the place had an ancient beach, where stood the convent and the old church of Virgin of Candelaria. In the center of the beach was the Castillo de San Pedro, which was built in 1697. This castle was designed to defend the church and convent of pirate attacks and looting. The castle was virtually destroyed in the storm of November 1826, it was lost in the original image of the Virgin of Candelaria. After the start of construction of the Basilica of Candelaria in 1949 created the need to build a large square that frames the basilica esplanade taking advantage of the natural beach.

The foundation work of the square began in the late 1950s. Finally, the square is inaugurated on January 31, 1959, by the Bishop of the Diocese of Tenerife, Domingo Pérez Cáceres.

== Statues of the Guanches ==
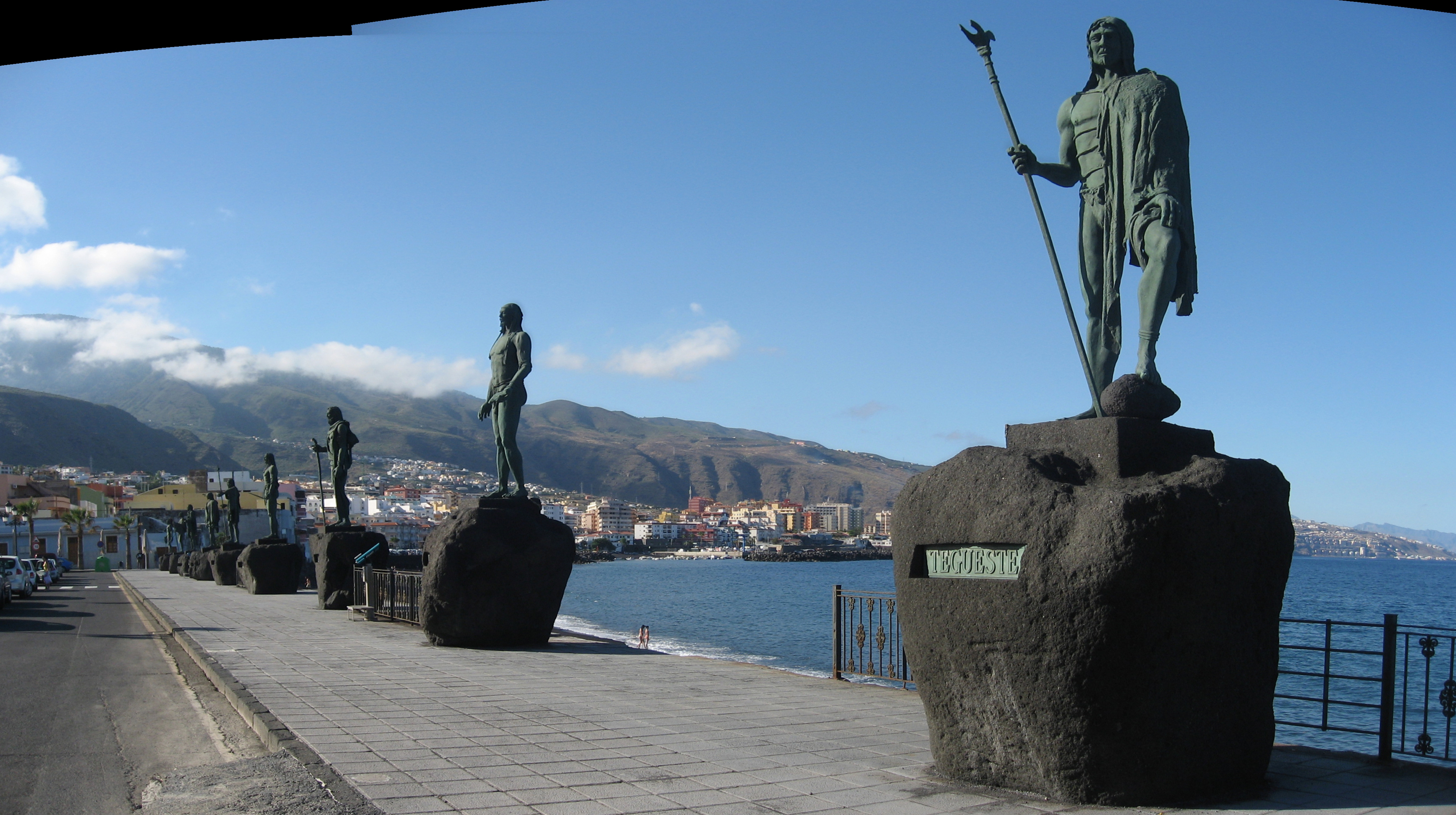
Statues of the Guanches

On one side of the square are statues of the nine kings who ruled the nine aboriginal Guanche menceyatos, the pre-Castilian kingdoms of Tenerife. Currently, there are bronze statues at the locale. They replaced volcanic stone carvings, which were transferred to another avenue in the late 20th century. The menceyato statues were inaugurated on August 13, 1993 by the sculptor José Abad.

These statues are:

- Acaimo or Acaymo (mencey (king) of Menceyato de Tacoronte).
- Adjona: (mencey (king) of Menceyato de Abona).
- Añaterve: (mencey (king) of Menceyato de Güímar).
- Bencomo: (mencey (king) of Menceyato de Taoro).
- Beneharo: (mencey (king) of Menceyato de Anaga).
- Pelicar: (mencey (king) of Menceyato de Icode).
- Pelinor: (mencey (king) of Menceyato de Adeje).
- Romen: (mencey (king) of Menceyato de Daute).
- Tegueste: (mencey (king) of Menceyato de Tegueste).

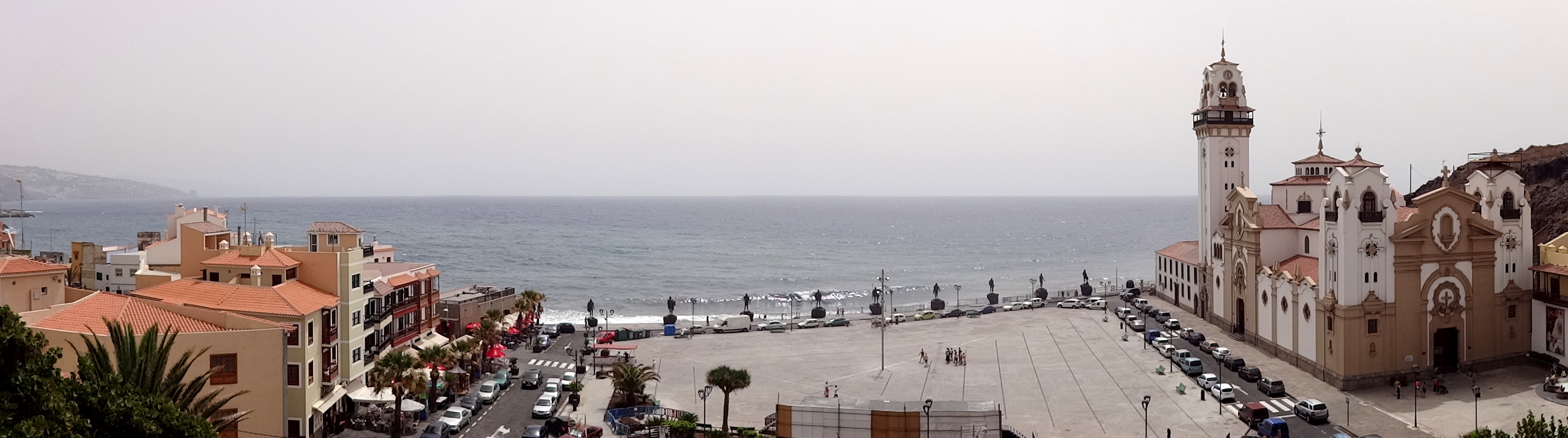
Overview of the square.
