= Pelicar (mencey) =

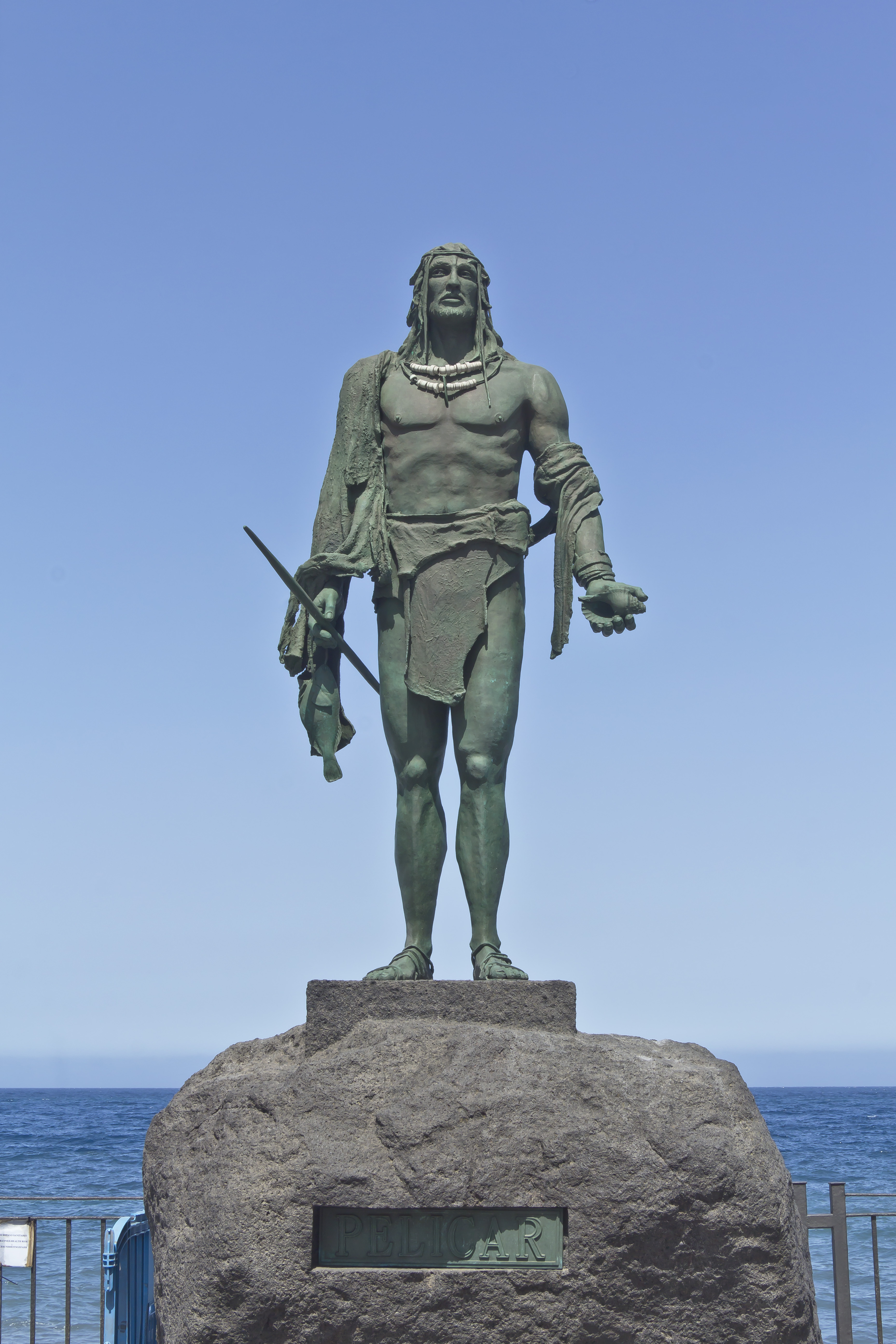
Statue of Pelicar in Plaza de la Patrona de Canarias, Candelaria, Tenerife.

Pelicar, also written Pellicar or Belicar was a Guanche mencey king of Menceyato of Icode in times of the conquest of Tenerife in the fifteenth century.

Pelicar joined the king of Menceyato de Taoro, Bencomo, to repel the Spanish invasion in 1494, including its menceyato in war camps. However, some historians as Viera y Clavijo indicate that Pelicar not allied with Bencomo, as wary of the ambitions of this. Finally, after successive defeats and the loss of key Guanche kings (Bencomo, Tinguaro and Bentor), the mencey of Icode surrendered in 1496, subject to the conquerors in the act known as Paz de Los Realejos.

Pelicar was taken to the court of the Catholic Monarchs by Alonso Fernández de Lugo along with six other menceyes to be presented to the monarchs. And in court, Pelicar was sold into slavery unfairly by the royal butler Pedro Patiño, who had been delivered to be his guardian, being released by royal command soon after. The ultimate fate of mencey except possibly ending his days in Seville as a free man is not known.
