= Cave of Achbinico =

Church and cave located in Canary Islands

Achbinico cave or Saint Blas cave
- Cueva de Achbinico / Cueva de San Blas (Spanish)
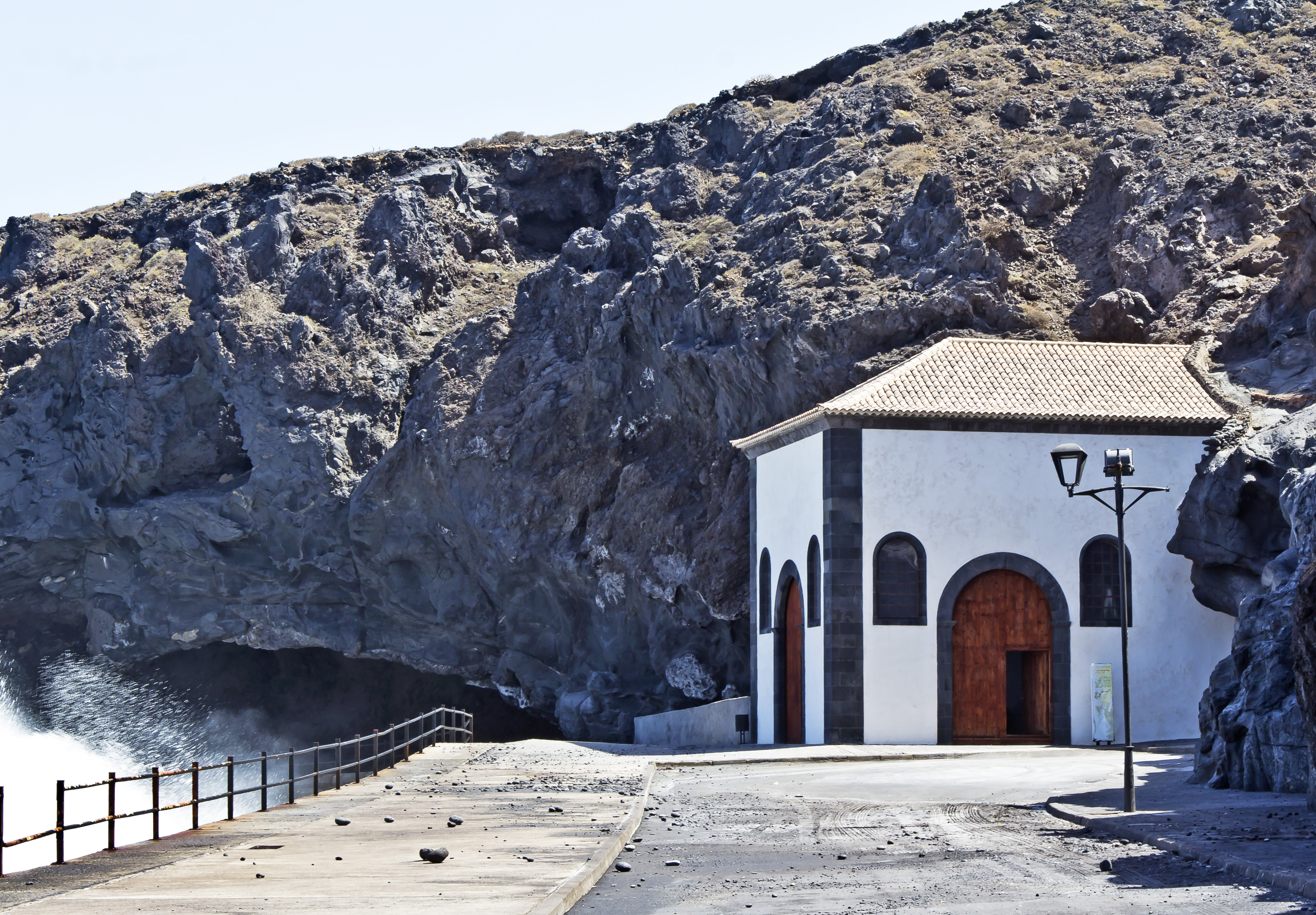

- Location within Canary Islands
- 28°21′03″N 16°22′10″W
- Location: Candelaria, Tenerife, Canary Islands, Spain

Spanish Cultural Heritage
- Official name: Cave of Achbinico
- Criteria: Monument

Achbinico cave and chapel or San Blas cave and chapel (in Spanish) Cueva y ermita de Achbinico Cueva y ermita de San Blas
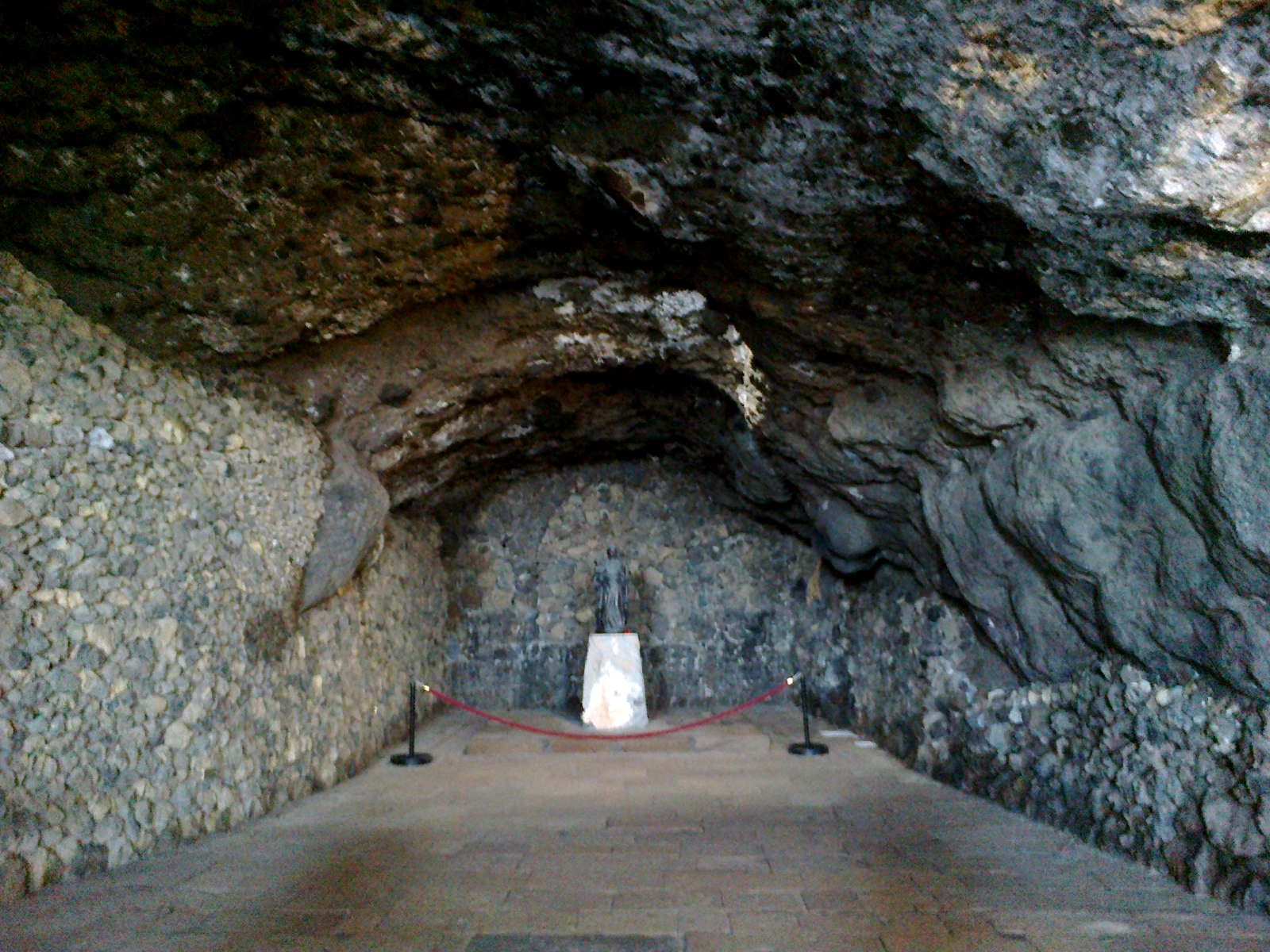

Religion
- Affiliation: Roman Catholic Church
- Province: Diocese of Saint Cristóbal de La Laguna
- Ecclesiastical or organizational status: Chapel
- Leadership: Bishop Bernardo Álvarez Afonso

Location
- Location: Candelaria, Tenerife, Canary Islands, Spain
- Interactive map of Achbinico cave and chapel or San Blas cave and chapel (in Spanish); Cueva y ermita de Achbinico; Cueva y ermita de San Blas

Architecture
- Style: church
- Groundbreaking: Use of the cave as a Catholic sanctuary began in 1446; the chapel that recovers the cave was built in 1518.
- Spanish Cultural Heritage
- Criteria: chapel, cave

Cueva de Achbinico, also called cave of San Blas (Spanish: cueva de Achbinico) is a Roman Catholic church and cave located in Candelaria, Tenerife, Canary Islands (Spain).

After the conquest of the Canary Islands it was the first Christian sanctuary of religious significance. It was also the first sanctuary dedicated to the Virgin Mary in the Canary Islands, where the Virgin of Candelaria, the patron saint of the Canary islands, was worshipped.

== Situation and presentation ==
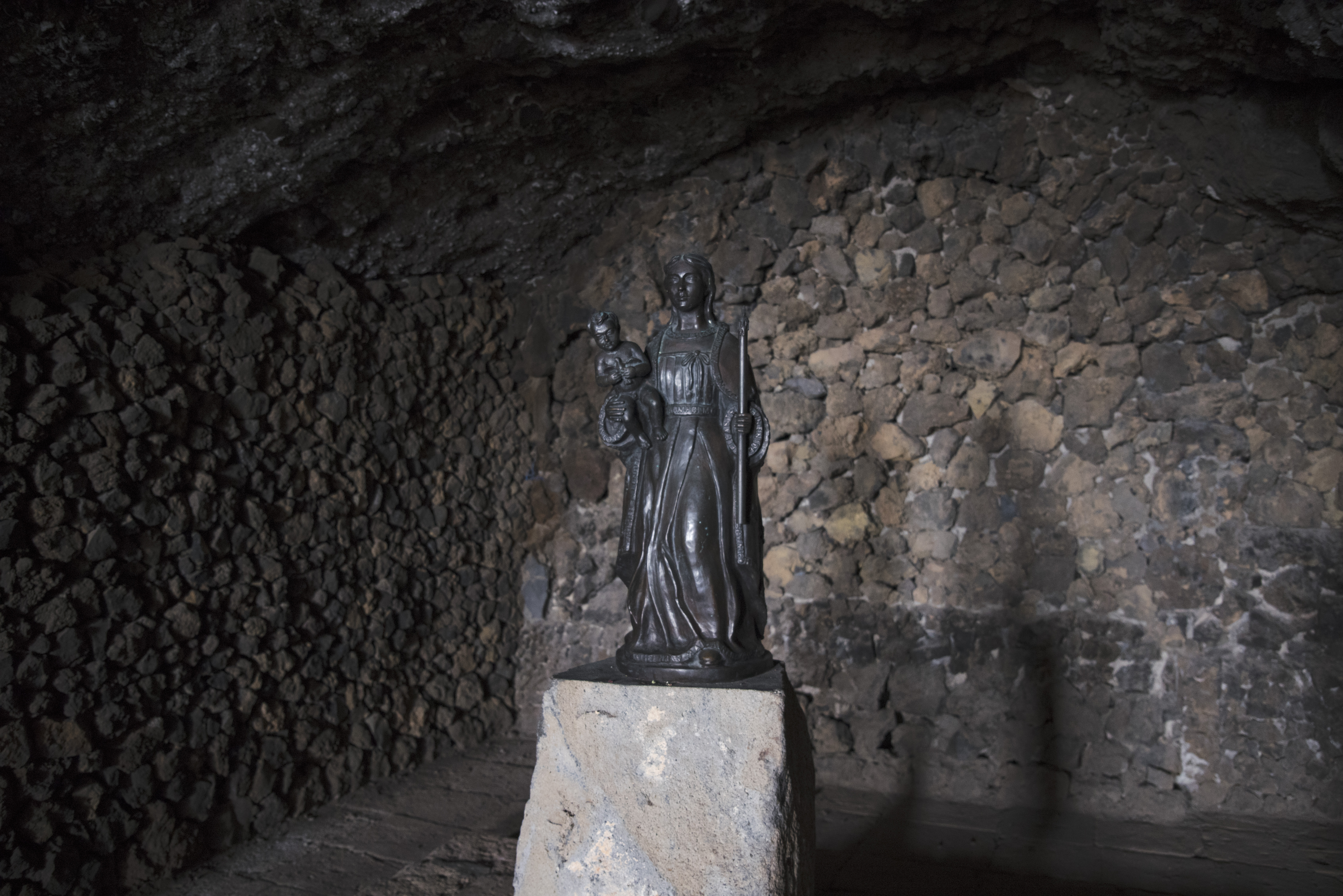
Statue of the Virgin of Candelaria, in the cave of Achbinico.

The cave is located on the coast, just behind the basilica of Our Lady of Candelaria. It is elongated and deep, with a ceiling shaped as a dome. It is 14 meters long by 6 meters wide and 5 meters high. A small chapel was built just outside of it, covering and including within its walls the entrance of the cave.

Inside the cave is a bronze replica of the Virgin of Candelaria. Her statue is most venerated on the island, and has turned the cave into the most important pilgrimage centre in the Canaries for the past five centuries. It is still visited by pilgrims, who commonly take and leave flushed candles and do requests to the Virgin.

The Achbinico cave has a great importance, not only religious but also historic and prehistoric.

== Prehistory ==
Various archaeological excavations have proved that the cave was a place of worship long before the Guanches placed the statue of the Virgin in it. According to recent excavations, the layers of ashes found there and subjected to carbon-14 dating indicate an age of more than 3000 years. In this cave a permanent fire had been maintained, such as in the vestal temples of Antique Rome. This sacred character held from very ancient times would explain that after the conquest the original inhabitants of the Canary Islands placed the Virgin precisely in this cave and nowhere else.

== History ==
The cave long served as a Christian worship place. When the statue of the Virgin of Candelaria was found on Güimar's beach of Chimisay at the end of the 14th century, the island had not yet been conquered by the Kingdom of Castile and its native inhabitants were the Guanches. The statue's finders brought it to Acaymo, the Guanche king (or mencey), at his cave-palace of Chinguaro. The statue was translated to the Achbinico cave in 1446, the ceremony accompanied with popular celebrations.

In one of the walls of the cave there is a picture explaining the story of the translation of the Virgin. In the lower part of it is a text that says:

Upon advice of Guanche Antón, Hernán Peraza's page boy, king Acaymo of Güimar translated the statue of Our Lady of Candelaria, from his palace of Chinguaro, to this cave of Achbinico.

Guanches were baptized in the cave. The original baptismal font used to this effect is preserved in the basilica's camarín.

In 1497, Tenerife conqueror Alonso Fernandez de Lugo held in this cave the first celebration of Candlemas, at the same time as the Festivity of the Purification of the Virgin.

In 1526, on February 2 (Candlemas), the Virgin was translated from the cave to its new chapel. The current basilica of Candelaria, the primary Marian shrine of the Canary Islands, was built later in 1959. It sits over the remains of a small church that had burned down a few hundred meters away from the cave.

King Philip II was declared protector of the Virgin of Candelaria. After ascending the throne, the Spanish monarch gave the title of "Royal" to this sanctuary - the first sanctuary in the Canary Islands to have received that title.

In this cave there is also a statue of saint Blas, whose original statue was placed there in 1530 and substituted much later with the present one from sculptor Fernando Estévez. Thus the cave remains honoured by the statue of a saint and maintains its tradition of worship in February: on February 2 there is a religious ceremony in honour of the Virgin of Candelaria and on February 3 the worship is dedicated to saint Blas, with the statue carried out in procession around the plaza de la Patrona de Canarias. This is why the Achbinico cave is also called Saint Blas' cave, with both names in use.

== See also ==
- Basilica of Candelaria
- Candelaria
- Cave of Chinguaro
