= Pelinor (mencey) =

Ruler in the Canary Islands (died c. 1505)

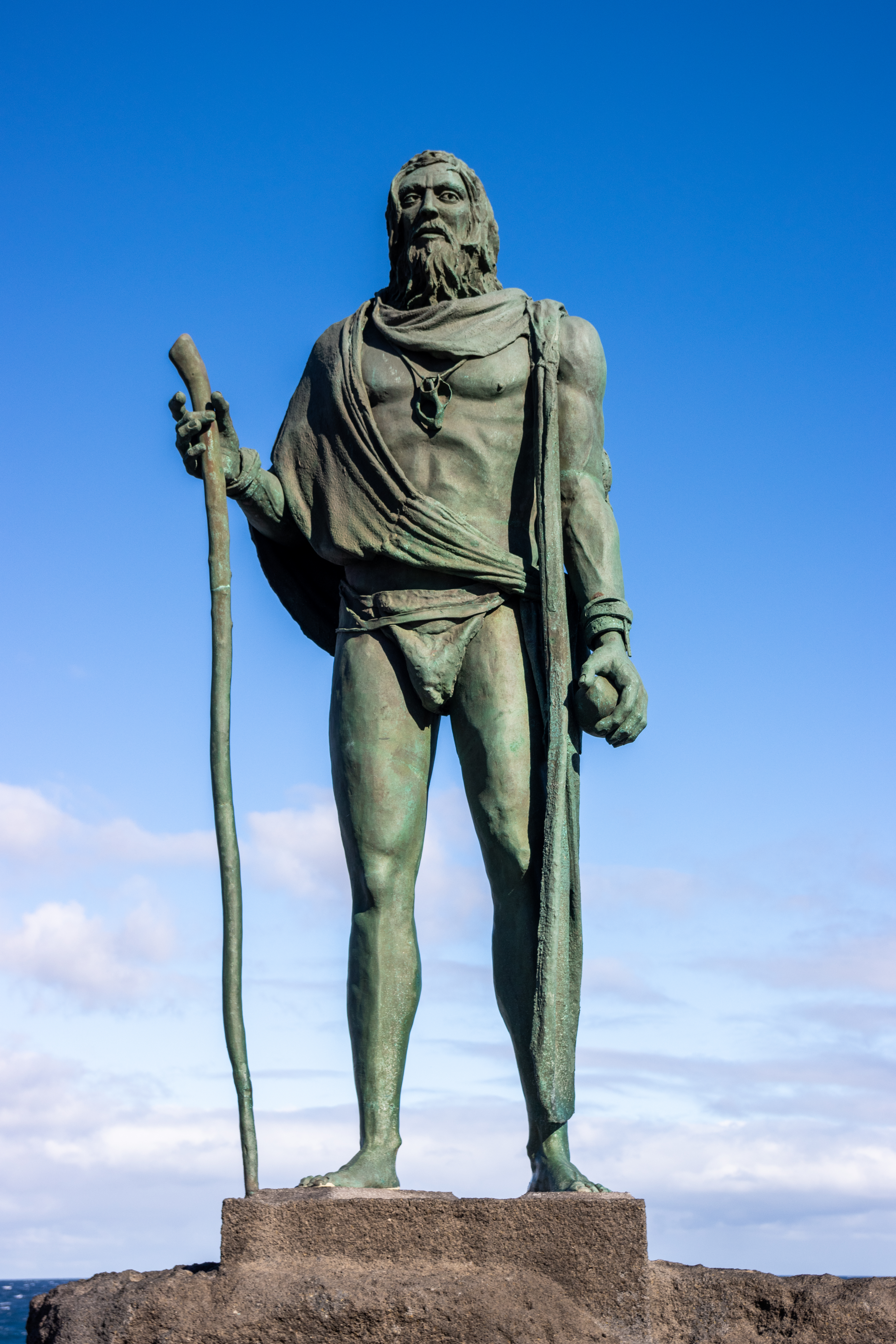
- Born: 15th century Adeje (Tenerife, Canary Islands)
- Died: c. 1505; Tenerife
- Occupation: mencey

Pelinor was a Guanche mencey king of Menceyato de Adeje at the time of the conquest of Tenerife in the 15th century.

== Life ==
Alongside the menceyes of Abona and Güímar, Pelinor negotiated peace around 1490 with Pedro de Vera, Governor of Gran Canaria, ratifying a treaty with Alonso Fernández de Lugo at the beginning of the conquest in 1494. Once the war ended, Pelinor was the only mencey not brought to the Peninsula to be presented to the Catholic Monarchs.

As a mencey who actively supported the conquerors in the peace negotiations, he was amply rewarded by the new authorities. He received the entire Valle de Masca (Masca Valley), 30 acres of land with water on the "Río de Chasna" (Valle de San Lorenzo) and another 100 acres in the Valle de Santiago - both pieces of land in the former domains of Adeje. Also, his family was granted a coat of arms.

== Death ==
Pelinor died around 1505.

Among Pelinor's notable descendants is the American actor and singer Anthony Ramos.
