= Cave of Chinguaro =

Cave and church in Güímar, Canary Islands, Spain

Coordinates: 28°19′25″N 16°23′45″W

Cave-Shrine of Chinguaro
- Cueva de Chinguaro

Religion
- Affiliation: Roman Catholic Church
- Diocese: Diocese of San Cristóbal de La Laguna
- Province: Archdiocese of Seville
- Rite: Roman
- Ecclesiastical or organisational status: Shrine

Location
- Location: Güímar, Spain.
- Interactive map of Cave-Shrine of Chinguaro

Architecture
- Type: church

Cave-Shrine of Chinguaro is a cave and associated Roman Catholic church located in Güímar on Tenerife (Canary Islands, Spain). It was the traditional palace of Acaimo, the Guanche king of the Menceyato de Güímar. After the Spanish conquest, they venerated the cave as a site of the Virgin Mary, and later built a church shrine there.

In this cave, the ancient Guanche venerated the goddess Chaxiraxi of their traditional faith, related to the Berbers of North Africa.

After the Castilian conquest, Spanish clergy identified the icon with the Virgin Mary and had it moved to the Cave of Achbinico in Candelaria. This cave became the first shrine devoted to the Virgin of Candelaria. It was the first Guanche shrine to contain a Christian idol in the Canary Islands, but most of the natives adhered to their traditional religion.

The cave has been found to be a site of archaeological importance. Layers of ash have been carbon-dated and found to be more than 3,000 years old, showing long indigenous occupancy.

== See also ==
- Church of the Guanche People
- La Laguna Cathedral
