= Menceyato of Adeje =

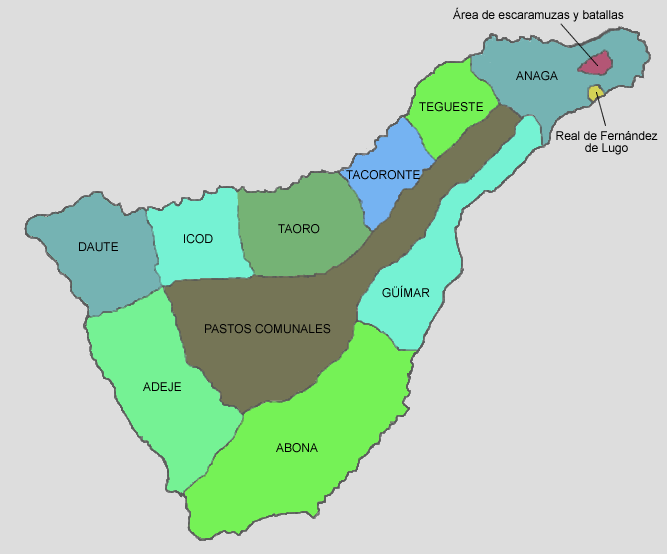
Tenerife prior to the Castilian conquest.

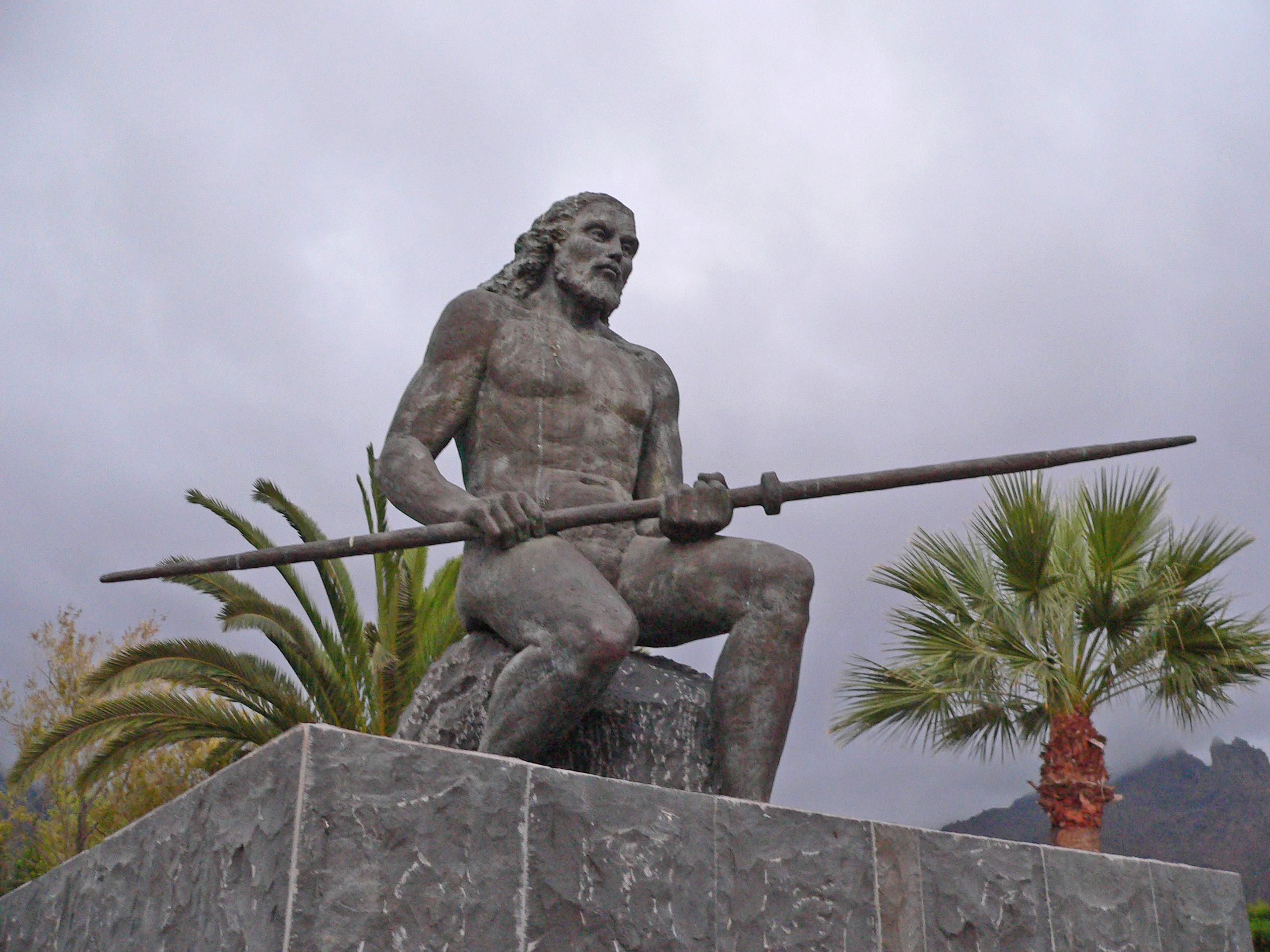
Statue of Tinerfe (Adeje, Tenerife).

Adeje was one of the 9 menceyatos (native Guanche kingdoms) on the island of Tenerife (Canary Islands, Spain) before the arrival of the conquering Spaniards and occupied the present-day towns of Guía de Isora, Adeje, Santiago del Teide, as well as possibly also part of Arona, in the southwest of Tenerife.

The kings of Adeje were Betzenuriya, Pelinor, Tinerfe and Sunta.
