= Camarín =

Shrine or chapel set above and behind the altar in a church

The retablo of the Camarín of the Virgin of Loreto at the Church of San Francisco Javier, Tepotzotlán, Mexico

A camarín is a shrine or chapel set above and behind the altar in a church, but still visible from the body of the church. They are especially found in Spain and Portugal and throughout Latin America. George Kubler and Martin Soria, in Art and Architecture of Spain and Portugal, trace the typology to the mid-15th century Aragonese "viril", a window in the high altar created to display the consecrated host. According to Kubler and Soria, the camarín is first utilized in the Basílica de la Virgen de los Desamparados (Valencia), designed by Diego Martinez Ponce de Urrana 1652–1657. In de Uranna's design, one passes from the oval nave through one of two doorways flanking the high altar. These open on to chambers, at the rear of which stairways lead to the rear of the camarín, so that one emerges into the space looking out on the nave beyond.

Also noteworthy is the chapel of the Virgen del Pilar that protects the Holy Column and the image of the Virgin in the Basilica del Pilar in Zaragoza. The space was designed by the architect Ventura Rodríguez starting in 1754. It is made up of thin sheets of green marble from the Greek island of Tynos studded with seventy-two stars. All of them constitute authentic jewels as they are studded with precious stones, except for seven that are located in the canopy carved in silver and with ivory applications.

== Definition ==
Capilla ó pieza que suele haber detras de un altar, donde se venera alguna Imágen. Diccionario de arquitectura civil, 1802.

Translation: "Chapel or room, usually behind the altar, in which an image is venerated."

== Sources ==
Curl, James Stevens (2006). A Dictionary of Architecture and Landscape Architecture (Paperback) (Second ed.). Oxford University Press. p. 880. ISBN 0-19-860678-8.
