= Candelaria, Tenerife =

Candelaria
- Municipality
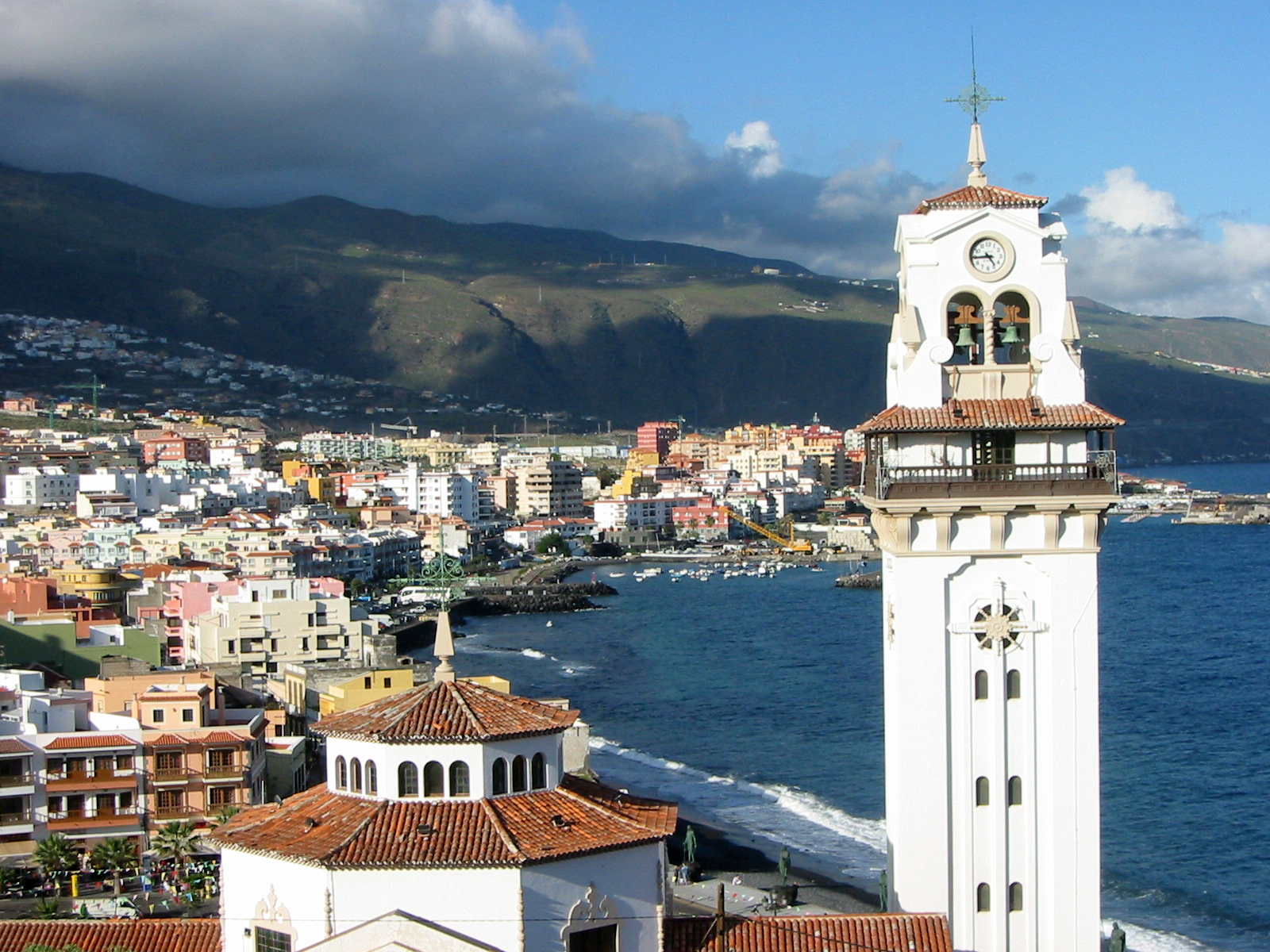

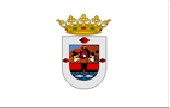
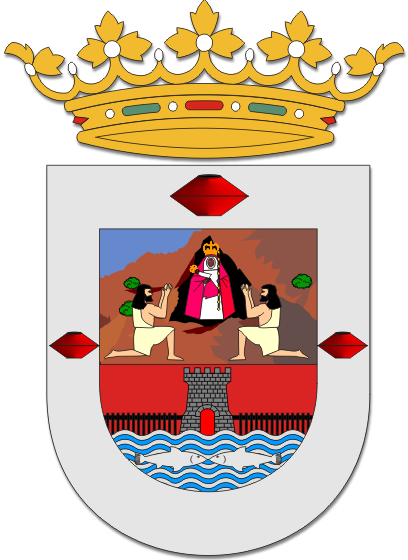
- Flag Coat of arms

- Municipal location in Tenerife

- Location in Tenerife Candelaria (Canary Islands) Candelaria (Spain, Canary Islands)
- Coordinates: 28°21′17″N 16°22′16″W
- Country: Spain
- Autonomous Community: Canary Islands
- Province: Santa Cruz de Tenerife
- Island: Tenerife

Government
  - Mayor: José Gumersindo García Trujillo (PSOE)

Area
  - Total: 49.18 km^{2} (18.99 sq mi)

Population (2025-01-01)
  - Total: 29,023
  - Density: 590.1/km^{2} (1,528/sq mi)
- Time zone: UTC±0 (WET)
  - Summer (DST): UTC+1 (WEST)
- Post Code: 38530
- Climate: BSh

Candelaria, also Villa Mariana de Candelaria, is a municipality and city in the eastern part of the island of Tenerife in the Province of Santa Cruz de Tenerife, in the Canary Islands, Spain. The city is located on the coast, 17 km southwest of Santa Cruz de Tenerife. The population is 25,140 (2010), and the area is 49.18 km².

The town is noted by Catholics in Spain and Latin America as a place of veneration of the Virgin of Candelaria, the patron of the Canary Islands. The most prominent building is the Basilica of Candelaria, which holds the sculpture of the Virgin Mary and murals. Also highlighted on the square are statues of the nine aboriginal kings of Tenerife.

In the times of the historic Guanche, the region was part of the menceyato, or kingdom, of Güímar. A sacred cave is situated near Candelaria that is believed to have been a place of indigenous worship for more than 3,000 years.

Since 1995 the Festival de la Canción de Candelaria has become one of the most important festivities on the island. It celebrated its 10th anniversary in 2005.

== Etymology of the name ==
In pre-Hispanic epochs, this zone pertained to Güímar's aboriginal Menceyato. It was accepted that the aboriginal name of the zone was simply "Güímar" as the whole menceyato.

After the conquest, the Spanish renamed the zone as "Candelaria", in honor of their virgin patron saint of the archipelago, the Virgin of Candelaria.

== History ==
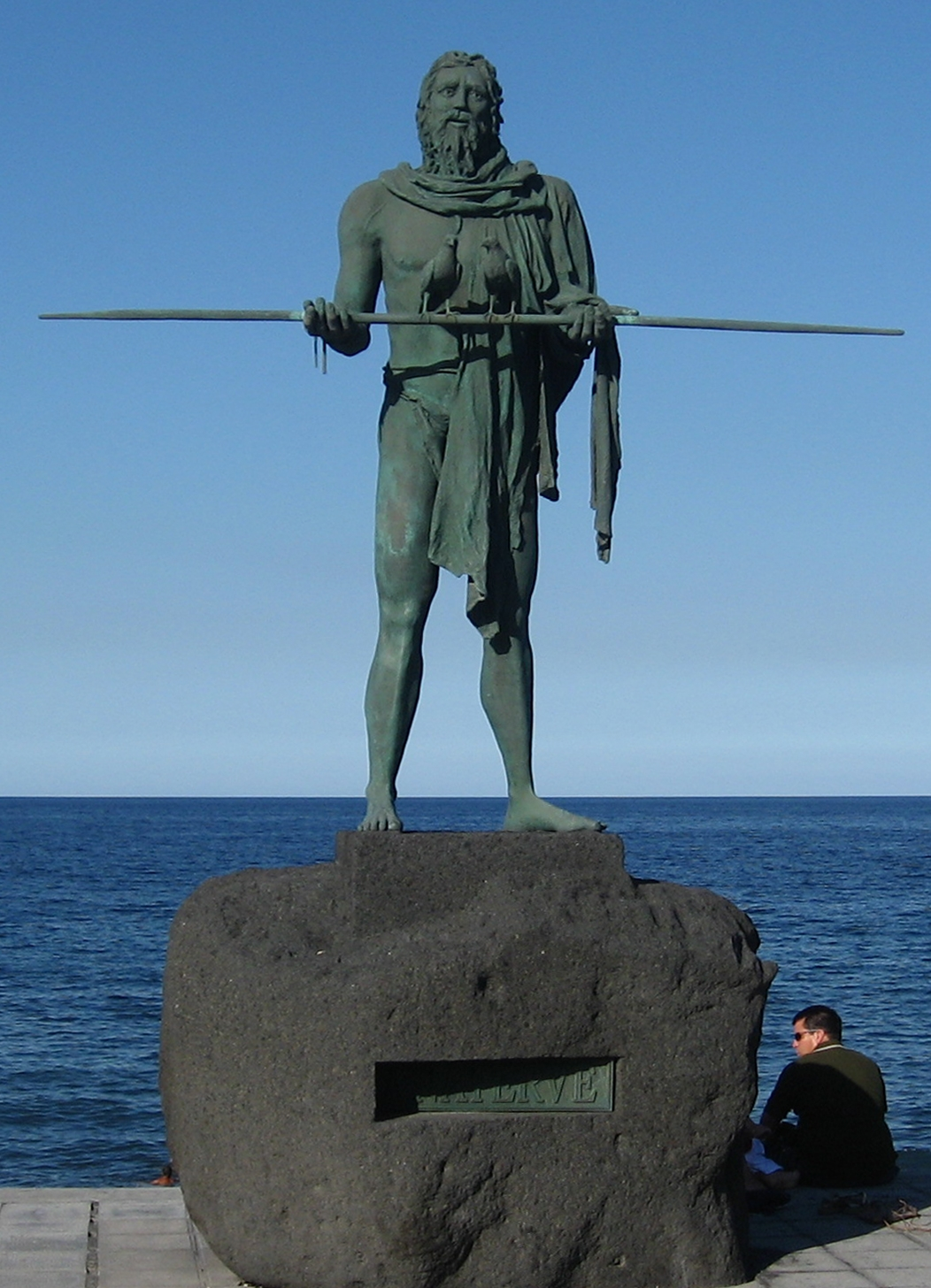
A statue of the Guanche chief (mencey) Añaterve. At his side there are eight more statues.

The town of Candelaria is surrounded by several prehistoric caves, where burials have been found containing mummies of the Guanche. Their burial process is considered very similar to the ritual treatment of the pharaohs in Egypt.

In 1390, the area of Candelaria was a solitary, deserted place where the Guanche of Güimar's menceyato (Güímar's pre-Hispanic kingdom) kept livestock for grazing. Accounts of the sighting of a sacred image vary. Two native herders were said to follow goats to a rock showing it.

Another oral history account told of the rock image being found on a beach near Candelaria. The Guanche told of moving the rock image to the Cave of Chinguaro, the palace of the King of Güímar. But later, the same Guanche were said to move her to Cueva de Achbinico in Candelaria, and there it has been venerated since. The aboriginals identified her with their goddess Chaxiraxi (the mother of the gods). but

The Christian Spanish conquerors later insisted that the image was the Virgin Mary. Later they constructed a hermitage and the Basilica to Santa Maria. They later designated her as the principal patron saint of the Canary Islands.

In the 21st century, Candelaria is the principal Catholic center of pilgrimage of the Canaries and one of the principal ones of Spain. It also attracts tourists to the island's other sites.

At the basilica there is a statue of the Virgin of Candelaria, which is dressed in mantles and jewels. The image is taken out in procession every February 2 (Catholic day of Candelaria) and August 15 (day of the Patron of Canaries). The latter date was originally that of the former aboriginal celebration known as Beñesmen, for the harvest.

The Spanish clergy took over August 15 to celebrate the Catholic Virgin Mary, stating that she had appeared to the people on those two dates. The Virgin of Candelaria is also venerated by the Hindu ethnic Indian community of the Canaries, who refer to her as the black virgin.

== Historical population ==
Year	Population
1991	10,688
1996	12,392
2001	14,247
2002	15,980
2003	17,938
2004	19,197
2005	20,628
2007	22,477
2010	25,140

== Sites of interest ==
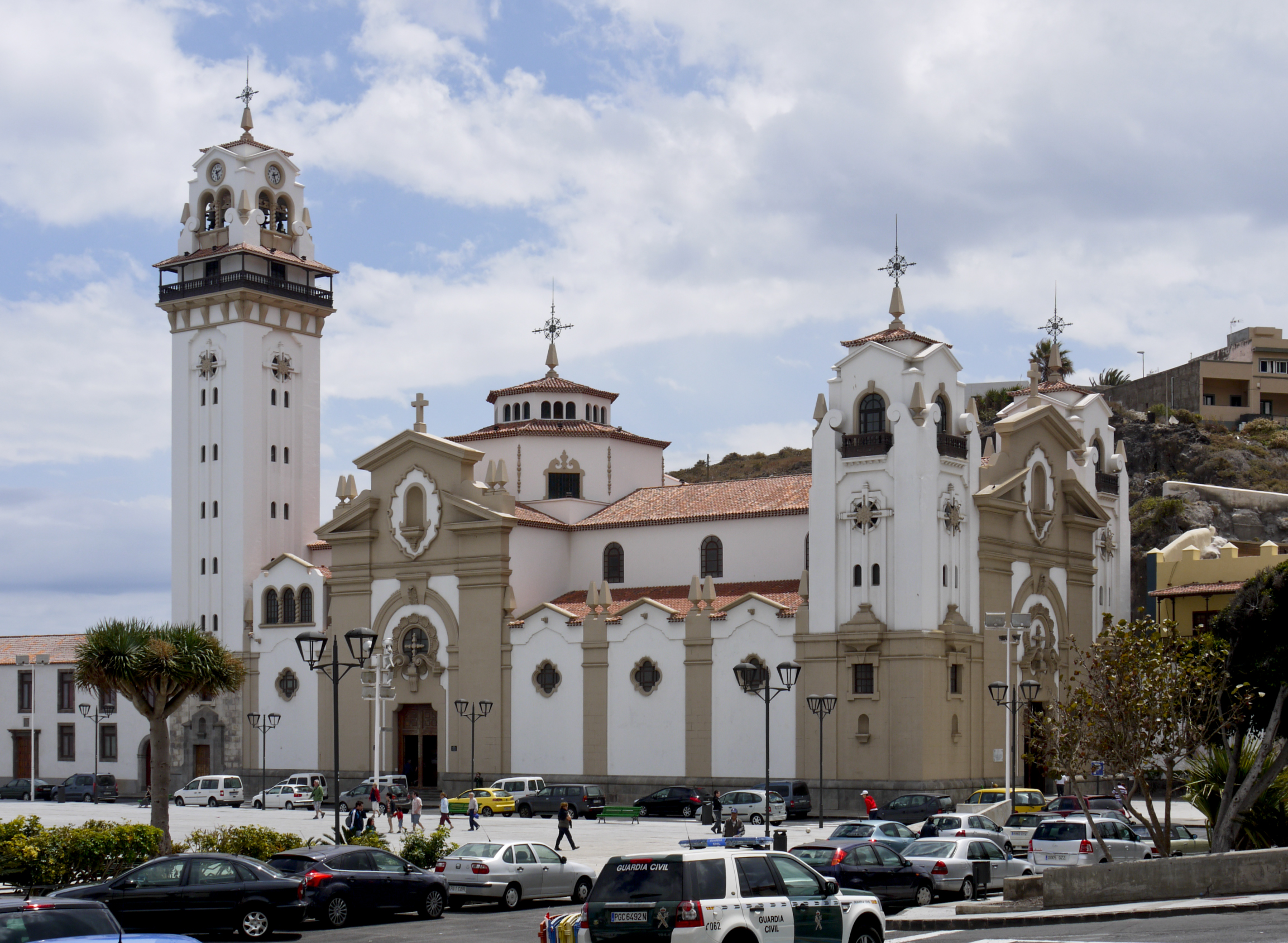
Basilica of Candelaria

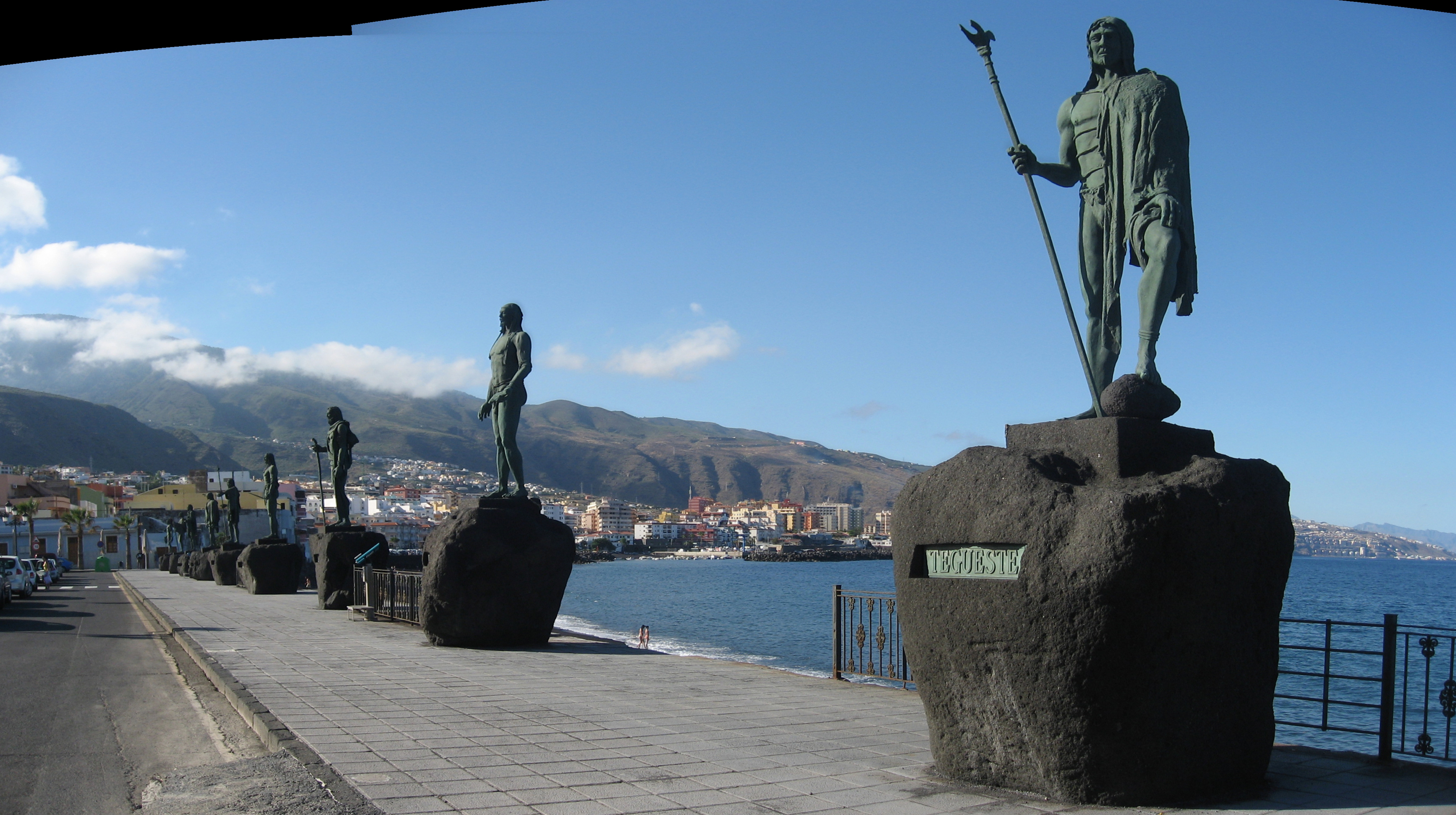
Statues of Guanche kings in the Plaza de la Patrona de Canarias

The municipality has a beach located to the east and is famous for tourism. Candelaria's municipality hosts the annual peregrination of the Virgin (on February 2 and on August 15; the latter is the most important as the Patron Saint's Day).

Pilgrims also visit the city in other seasons. The principal stops of any visit are the Basilica of Candelaria and Cueva de Achbinico, but there are other places of interest in the village:

=== Basilica of Candelaria ===
The first great Sanctuary to the Virgin of Candelaria was constructed in 1668. Later with the increase in the number of pilgrims and worshippers, the church decided to build the current basilica, which has capacity for 5,000 persons.

Built in 1959, the basilica was constructed on the site and using some materials of a former hermitage. It is located on one side of what is now called the Plaza de la Patrona de Canarias. The basilica is in the south part of the city, adjacent to the Atlantic Ocean.

Next to the basilica is the Dominican convent of the religious order in charge of the sanctuary. The basilica has numerous murals in addition to the sculpture of the Virgin Mary. The Royal Basilica Marian Shrine of Our Lady of Candelaria is considered the main temple dedicated to the Virgin Mary in the Canary Islands.

=== Cueva de Achbinico ===
Also called Cave of San Blas, it was the first Christian temple of the Canary Islands. Here the Guanche and Spanish worshipped the Virgin of Candelaria.

According to recent archaeological studies, layers of ash left by previous indigenous peoples have been carbon-14 dated to more than three thousand years. It appears that the people maintained a permanent fire, perhaps similar to that of the Vestal Virgins of ancient Rome.

=== Plaza de la Patrona de Canarias ===
The Plaza de la Patrona de Canarias (Square of the Saint Patron of the Canary Islands) is situated at the center of Candelaria. It is next to the Basilica of Candelaria.

Also around the square are bars and cafes frequented by residents and tourists. On one side of the square are statues of the nine 'kings' who ruled the nine aboriginal guanches menceyatos (pre-Hispanic kingdoms) of Tenerife.

=== Calle Obispo Pérez Cáceres ===
This is the main shopping street. Stores feature souvenirs, religious imagery, and crafts. The street runs parallel to the coast and the promenade of the city to the Plaza de la Patrona de Canarias and the Basilica of Candelaria.

=== Iglesia de Santa Ana ===
This church is dedicated to St. Anne, mother of the Virgin Mary. It is the parish church of Candelaria. The church was constructed in the mid-eighteenth century, but incorporated an earlier sixteenth-century chapel. It has many religious images.

== Festivals ==
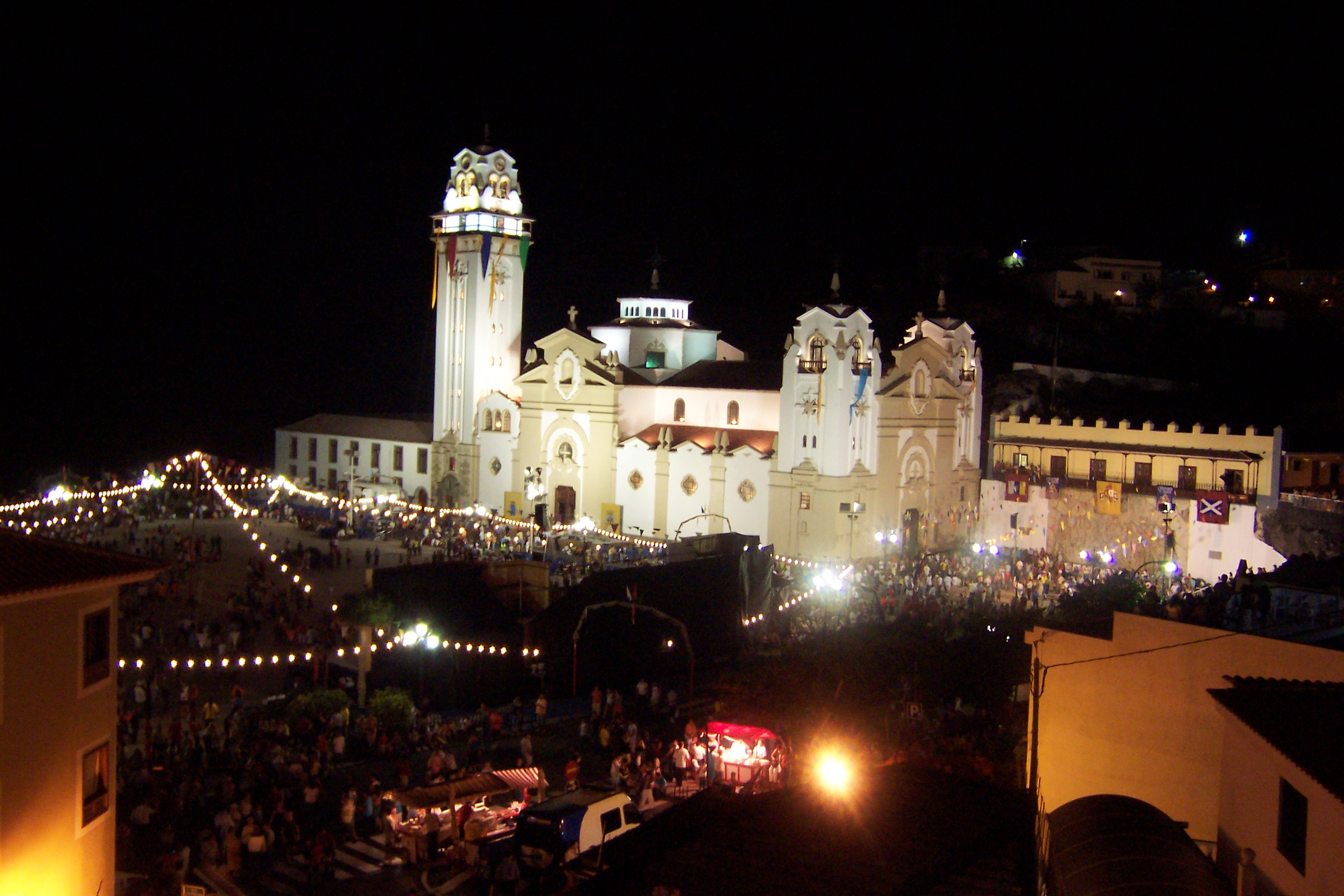
Basílica of Candelaria the day of the feast of the Virgin of Candelaria.

- Virgin of Candelaria, Liturgical Feast: February 2.
- Saint Blaise: 3 February.
- Carnival of Candelaria: February–March in the year, before Lent; carnival street bands perform.
- Festival Intercultural India - Canarias, "Intercultural Festival India - Canary Islands": First Sunday in May.
- Virgin of Carmen and Saint Anne: July 16 and July 26 respectively.
- Festival de la Canción de Candelaria, "Festival of Candelaria Song": Held in July since 1995, it has become an important festival in the islands.
- Virgin of Candelaria, Popular Festival: 14 to 15 August (central days).

== Sister cities ==
- Arafo, Tenerife, Spain
- Güímar, Tenerife, Spain
- Candelaria, Cuba
- Teror, Gran Canaria, Spain
- Rota, Cádiz, Spain

== Photos ==
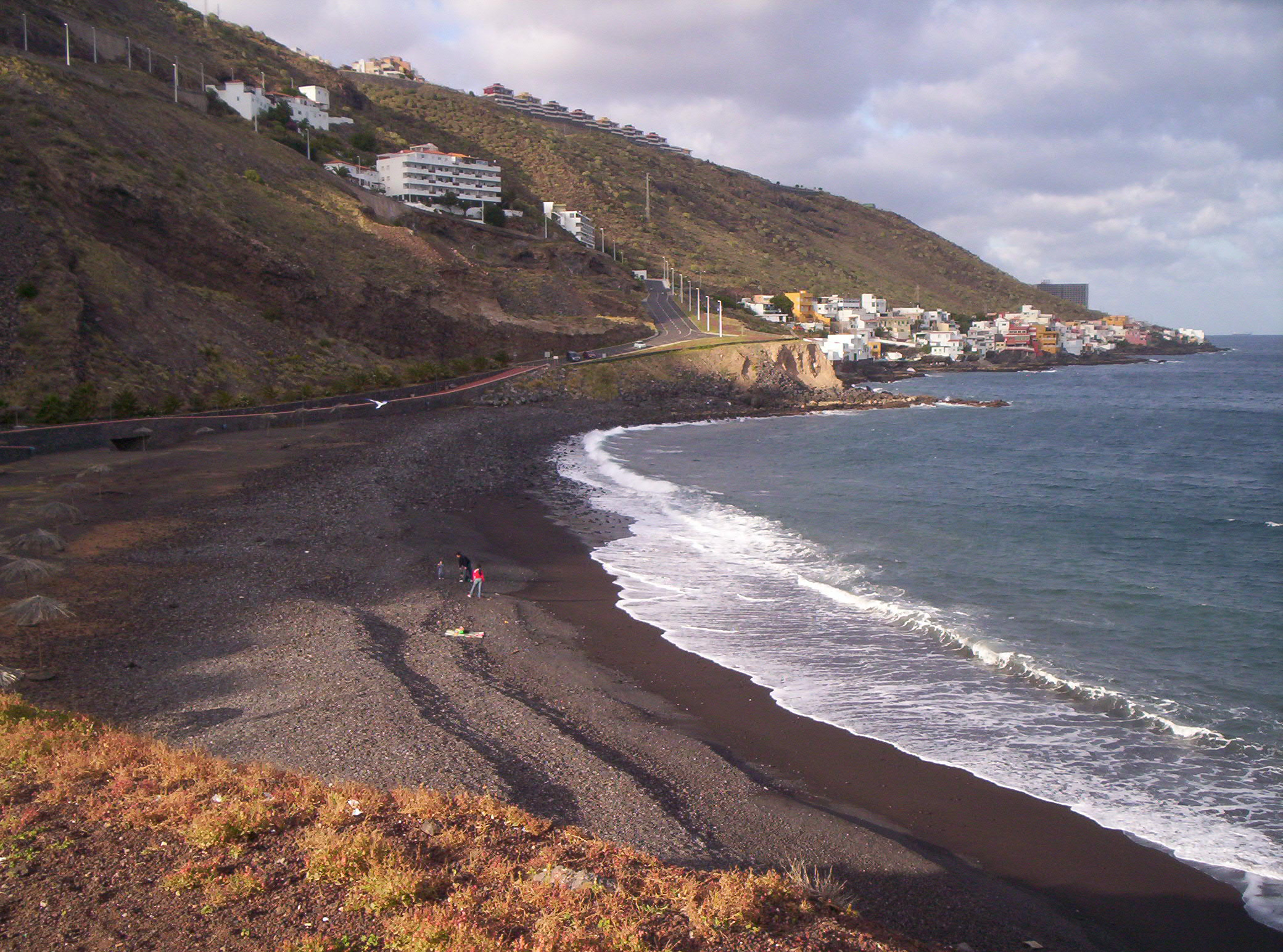
Playa de La Nea

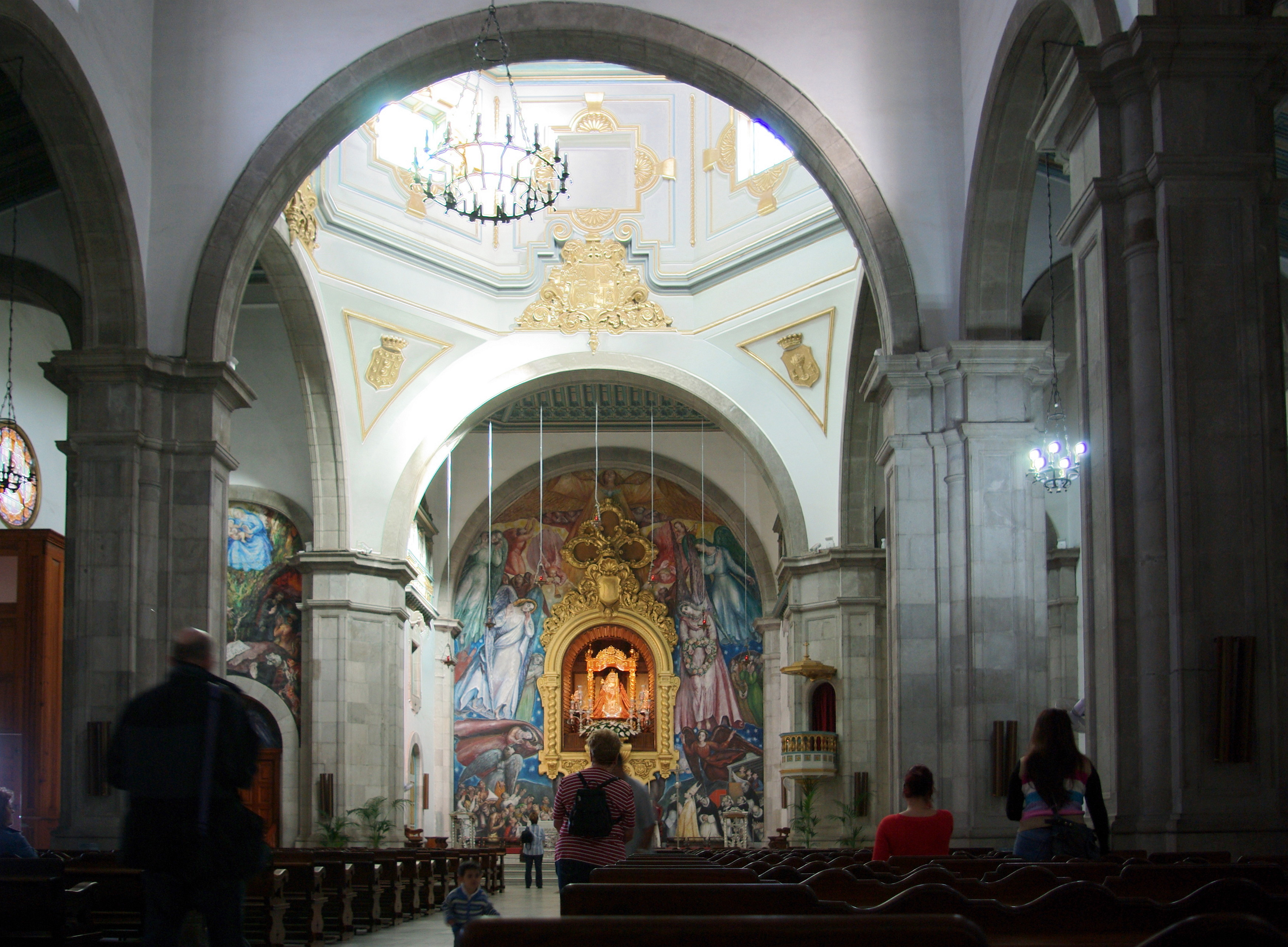
Basílica de Nuestra Señora de la Candelaria

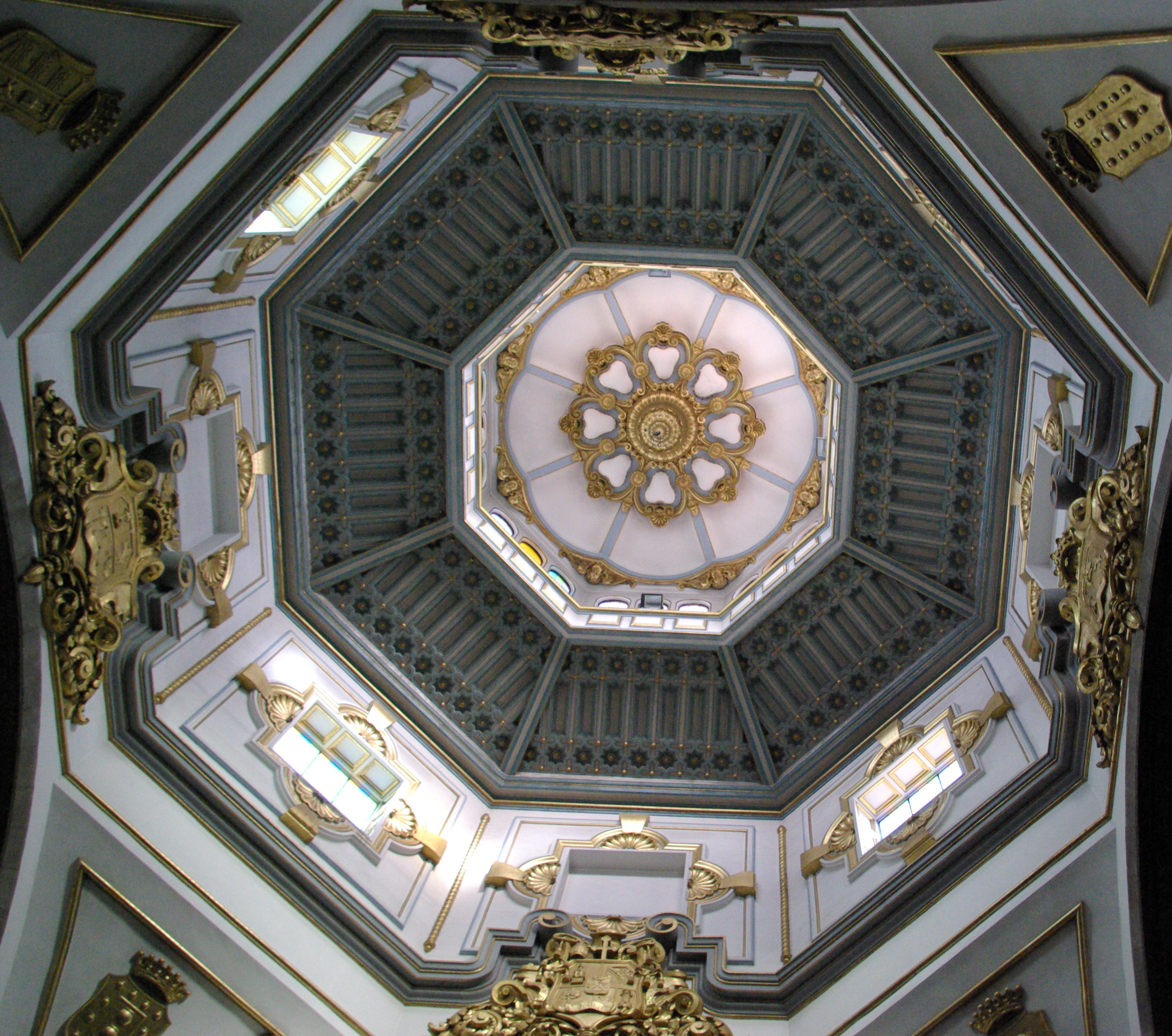
Basílica de Nuestra Señora de la Candelaria

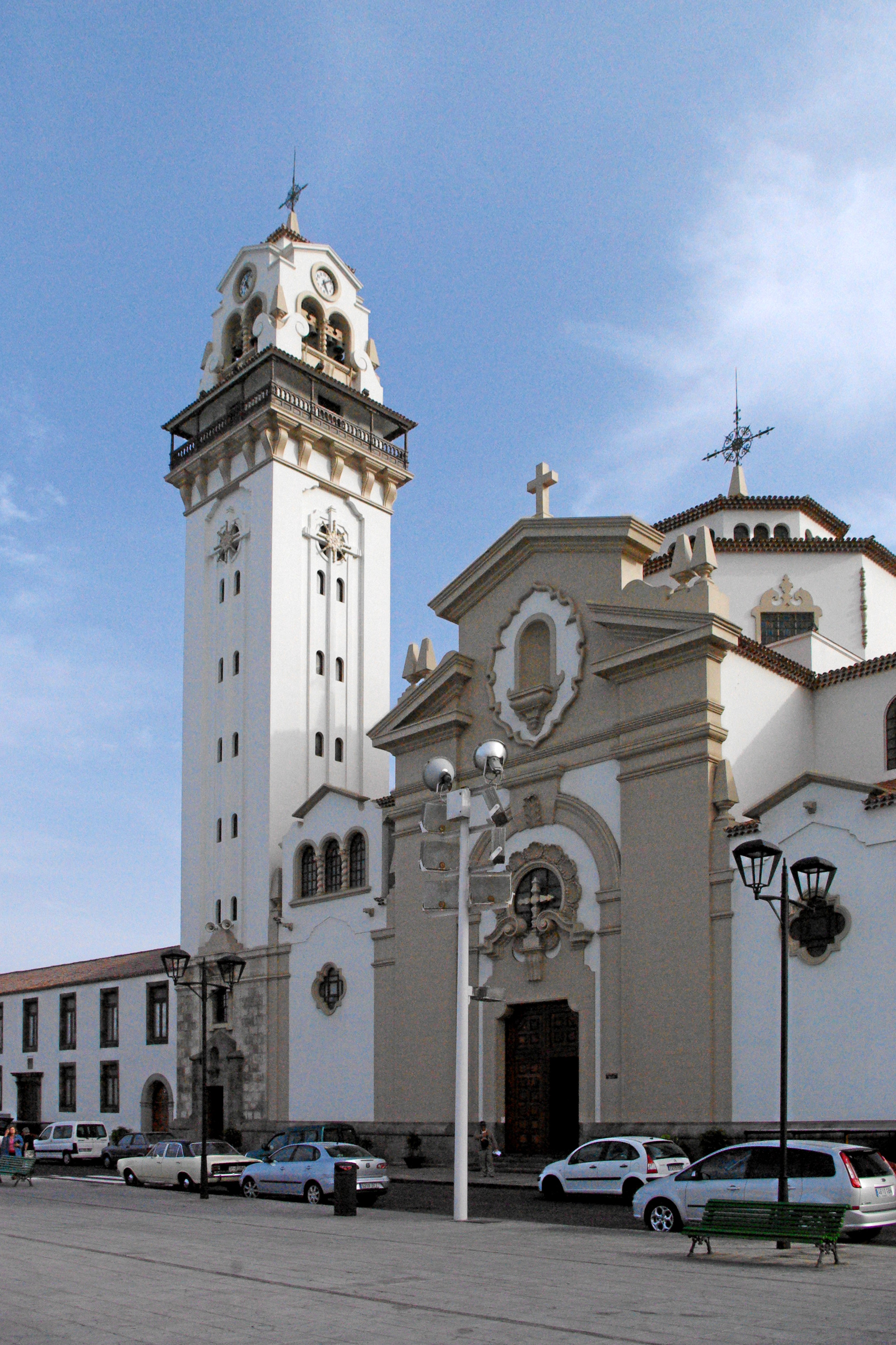
Basílica de Nuestra Señora de la Candelaria

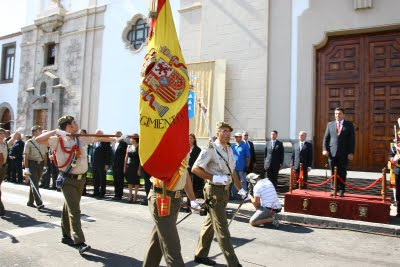
Military parade during the festival of the Virgin.

== See also ==
- List of municipalities in Santa Cruz de Tenerife
