= Menceyato of Güímar =

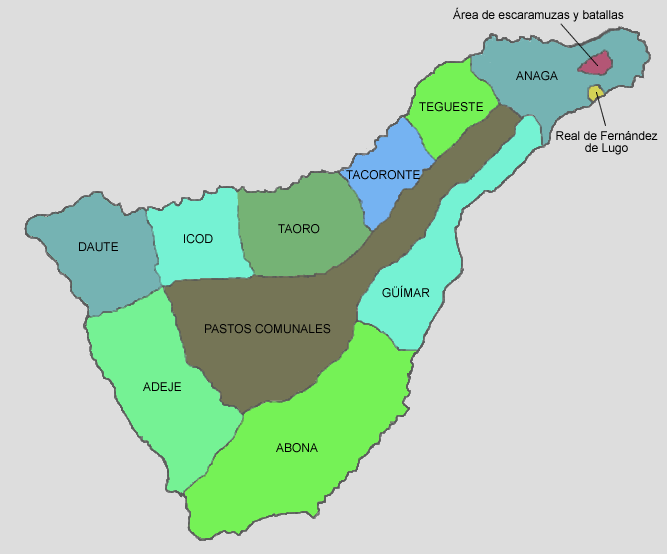
Tenerife prior to the Castilian conquest.

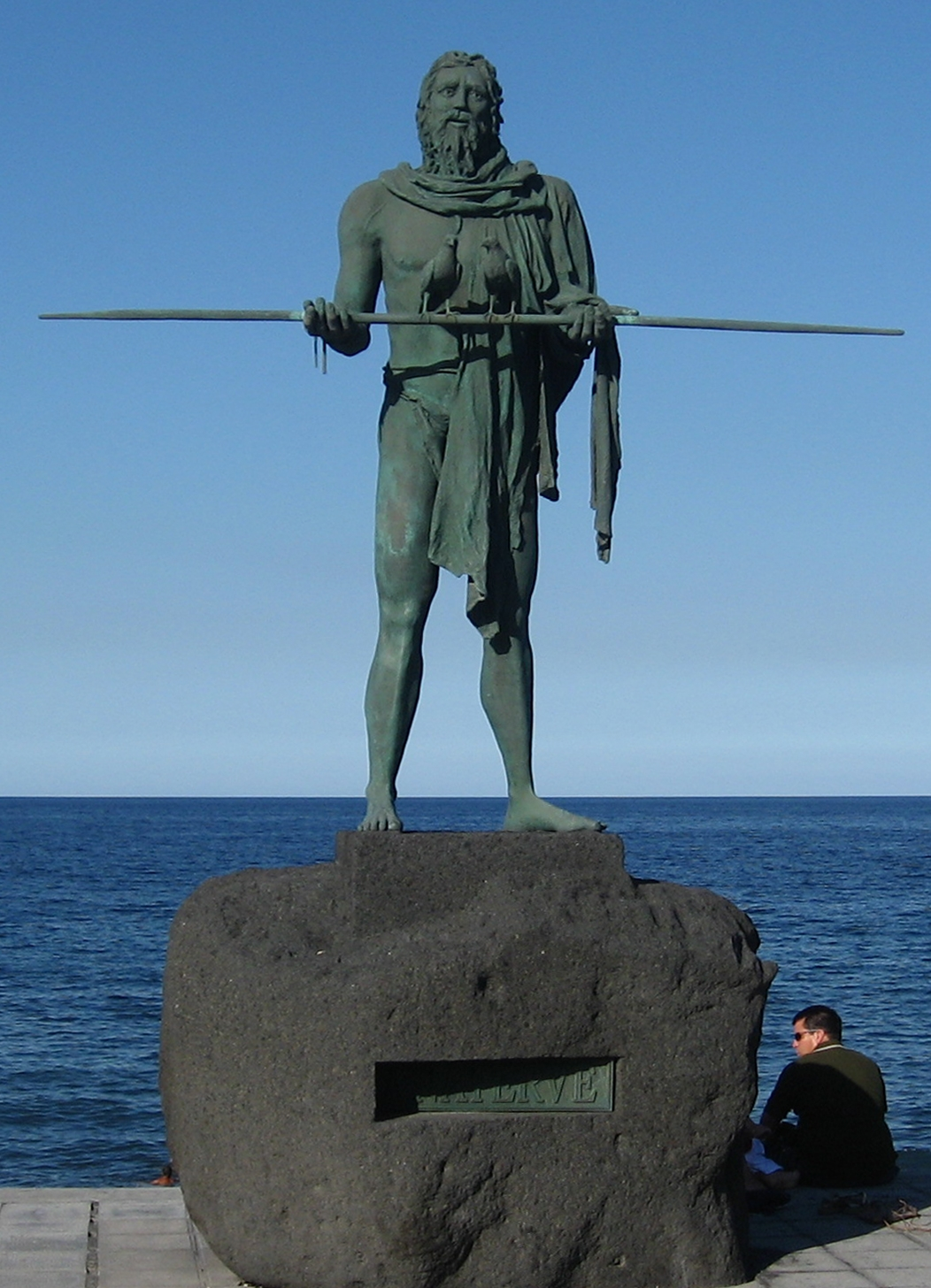
A statue of the Mencey Añaterve. Candelaria, Tenerife.

Güímar was one of nine menceyatos (native Guanche kingdoms) on the island of Tenerife (Canary Islands, Spain) at the time of the arrival of the Castilian conquerors. It controlled an area significantly greater than the actual municipality of Güímar, including part of Santa Cruz de Tenerife and San Cristóbal de La Laguna, El Rosario, Candelaria, Arafo and Fasnia, himself and perhaps a small part of the town of Arico.

Güímar was the site of the appearance of the image of the Virgin of Candelaria (patroness of the Canary Islands). Hence, this city played an important role in the evangelization of the whole archipelago. Around 1450 a hermitage formed by three friars led by Alfonso de Bolaños, considered the "Apostle of Tenerife," was founded in the area of the modern city of Candelaria. These friars lived among the Guanches, speaking their language and baptizing many of them. This mission would last nearly until the beginning of the conquest.

It is believed that the first mencey of Güímar could have been Acaymo, later succeeded by his son Añaterve. The latter would reign at the time of the conquest of Tenerife by Alonso Fernandez de Lugo.
