= 1582 Tenerife plague epidemic =

Disease outbreak in Tenerife, Canary Islands

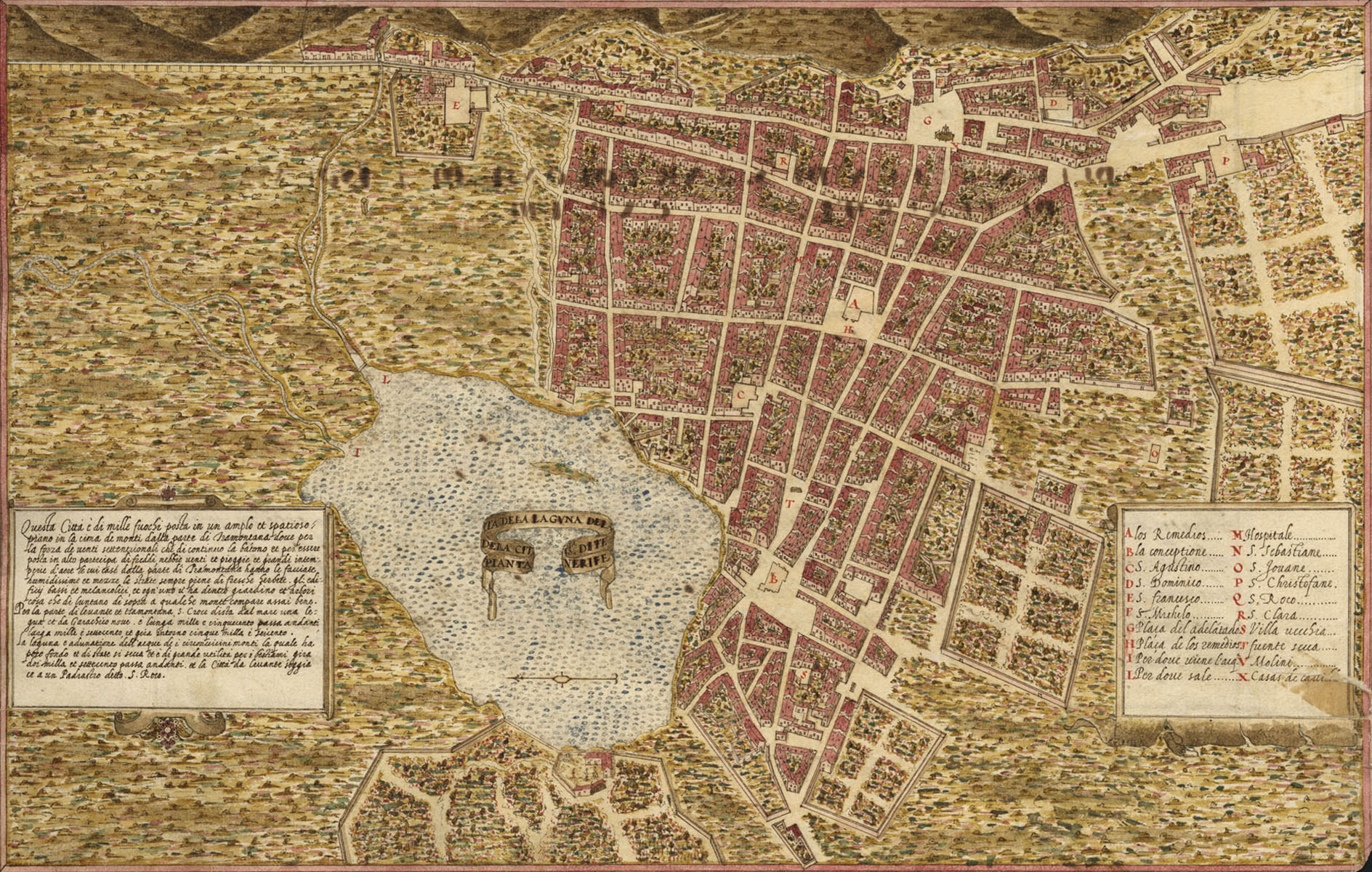
Map of La Laguna made by the engineer Leonardo Torriani in 1588, just six years after the epidemic.

The 1582 Tenerife plague epidemic or 1582 San Cristóbal de La Laguna plague epidemic was an outbreak of bubonic plague that occurred between 1582 and 1583 on the island of Tenerife in the Canary Islands. The epidemic is believed to have caused between 5,000 and 9,000 deaths on an island that at the time had fewer than 20,000 inhabitants (approximately 25–45% of the island's population). This epidemic is also known as the Plague of Landres.

== Context ==
It was the first major epidemic suffered by the Canary Islands after their conquest in the 15th century. The bacteria causing the disease arrived on the island on infected banners and tapestries brought by the governor of Tenerife, Lázaro Moreno de León, from Flanders to the parish of Our Lady of Los Remedios (the current Cathedral of San Cristóbal de La Laguna) for the celebration of Corpus Christi in 1582.

== Development of the disease ==
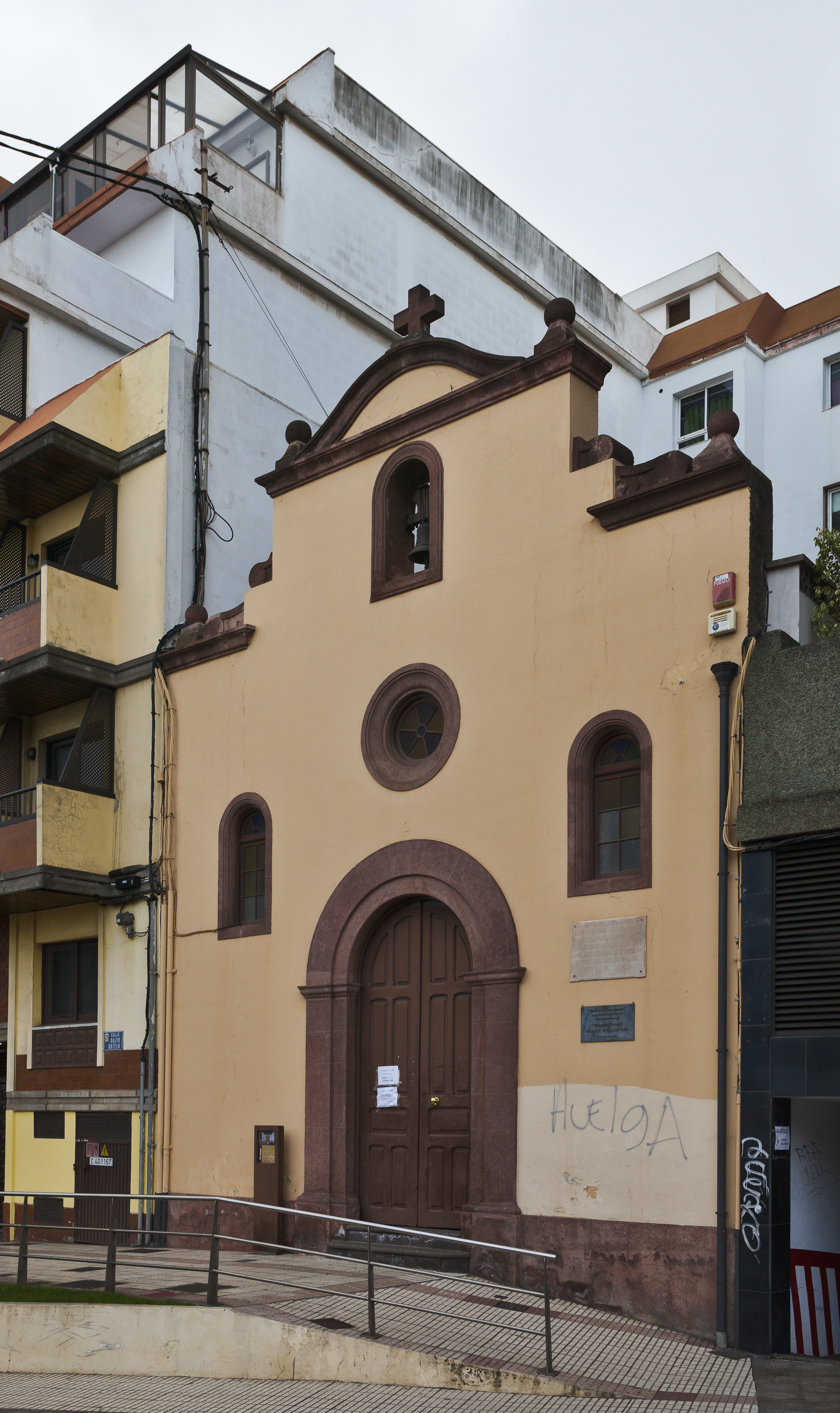
Hermitage of Saint Christopher, patron saint of the city. Nearby was one of the hospices for caring for plague victims.

Traditionally, it has been believed that the plague reached the port of Santa Cruz de Tenerife in May 1582. However, it is not ruled out that it arrived shortly before May, as recent research has been able to trace the first documented infected person, Manuel de León, who left his will on April 23 of that same year in the Hospital de Dolores in San Cristóbal de La Laguna. This will mentions buboes, so characteristic of this disease.

According to the chronicles, the first large-scale deaths occurred on the day of Corpus Christi, after the religious procession ended. On that first day, several thousand deaths had already been counted, as the disease was particularly virulent and aggressive.

The authorities ordered that the bodies be buried in areas near churches to prevent contagion. Many of these burials took place on the site where the parish of Saint John the Baptist was later built, located on the outskirts of the city. Saint John the Baptist himself was considered the city's protector against the plague, as it was necessary to wait until the following year for no more deaths from it to be recorded. That day was June 24th, the feast day of this saint.

Hospitals were set up in different parts of the city: the Hospital of Saint Sebastian (around the current Plaza del Cristo de La Laguna), the Casas de Negrón (near the aforementioned Hermitage of Saint John), and around the Hermitage of Saint Christopher, the city's patron saint. These hospices had as many as 450 sick people, as occurred in February 1583. The various measures adopted ranged from burning the clothes of those affected to holding processions and prayers, and even transporting the image of the Virgin of Candelaria to La Laguna.

Despite having caused a significant demographic decline for the city, La Laguna remained the archipelago's main urban center, as the birth rate increased over the long term and there was a large influx of immigrants to the island of Tenerife. It struck nearby towns in the Valle de Tabares, Tegueste, Tejina, Punta del Hidalgo, and Tacoronte, although with less virulence than San Cristóbal de La Laguna.

By September 1583, the plague was practically eradicated, and civil and religious celebrations were held in the city. At that time, the Dominicans of La Laguna approached King Philip II to ask for alms and resources, as the epidemic had decimated the convents. This was due to the fact that many friars had been infected through contact with the sick they had cared for, and also because many convent resources were used to care for the convalescents.

== Successive outbreaks ==
Later, in 1602, there was a new outbreak of bubonic plague on the island. It began to spread in the town of Garachico, an important commercial port on the island, claiming numerous lives and later spreading to the islands of Gran Canaria, Fuerteventura, and Lanzarote.

== See also ==
- Black Death

== Bibliography ==
- Cola Benítez, Luis Santa Cruz, bandera amarilla: epidemias y calamidades (1494-1910). Santa Cruz de Tenerife: Idea, 2005
- García Nieto, Víctor; Hernández González, Justo Páginas médicas canarias de ayer. Santa Cruz de Tenerife: Idea, 2007
