= Visit by Pope Leo XIV to Spain =

2026 apostolic journey

Apostolic Journey to Spain
- Date: 6–12 June 2026
- Location: Spain: Madrid; Barcelona; Gran Canaria; Tenerife
- Website: conelpapa.es (in Spanish)

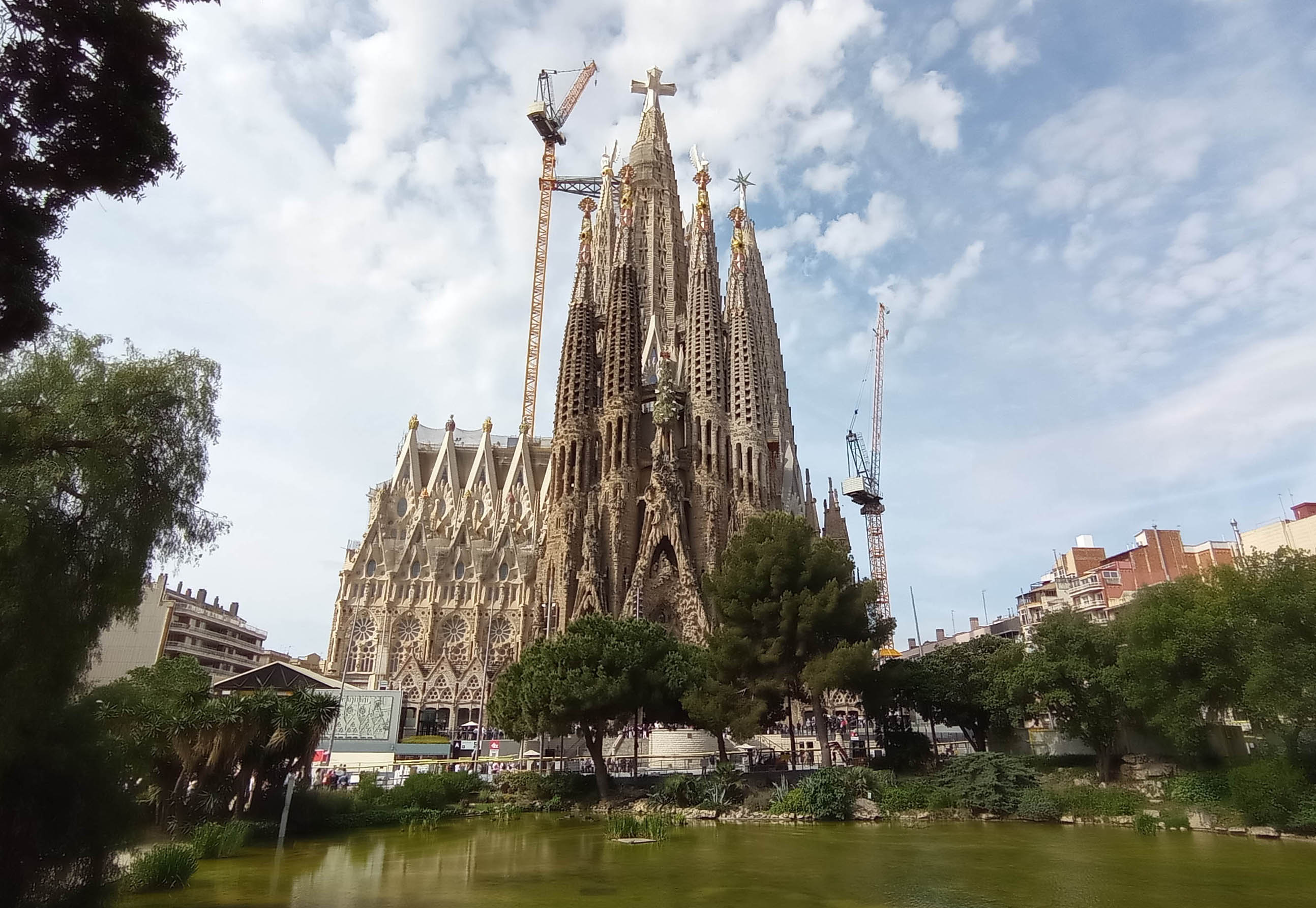
The Basilica of the Sagrada Família in Barcelona, one of the places the Pope visited during his stay in Spain.

Pope Leo XIV made an apostolic journey to Spain on 6–12 June 2026, to address the immigration crisis, inaugurate the Tower of Jesus Christ of the Sagrada Família, and strengthen ties with the Spanish government and the Spanish people. He visited Madrid, Barcelona, Gran Canaria, and Tenerife.

This journey came two months after the Pope's previous apostolic journey to Africa.

== Background ==
This visit by Pope Leo XIV was the first papal visit to Spain since Pope Benedict XVI's in 2011. It was characterized by a combination of high-level state diplomacy and Leo's pastoral priorities. For the first time in history, a Pope addressed the Spanish Parliament in a joint session of both chambers, which neither Popes John Paul II or Benedict XVI did during their numerous visits. Leo visited the Canary Islands, which is Spain's hotspot for migrants, to give a voice to those arriving from Africa. He visited a homeless facility in Madrid and a penitentiary in Barcelona, further emphasizing his vision of the Catholic Church as the "Church of the Poor".

The Pope's visit to the Canary Islands came after the recent MV Hondius hantavirus outbreak crisis, which disembarked its passengers in the island of Tenerife under the supervision of the Spanish Ministry of Health and the World Health Organization.

The trip coincided with the 100th anniversary of the death of Antoni Gaudí (10 June), the architect who designed the Sagrada Família, and the Pope inaugurated the new Tower of Jesus Christ, making the Sagrada Família the tallest church in the world. This visit followed the 2025 declaration of Gaudí as Venerable which brought him one step closer to beatification.

On early June, Islamic State posted a threat of an attack on the Pope on its channels, accompanied by images of the Santiago Bernabéu Stadium and the Sagrada Família.

== Preparations ==
In the weeks leading up to the visit, several initiatives were launched by the national organizing committee for the apostolic journey and the Spanish Episcopal Conference in anticipation of Leo XIV's visit. These included a series of biographical videos of saints associated with the places the Pope would visit. Two saints were chosen for each of the autonomous communities visited: Catalonia, represented by Saint Eulalia of Barcelona and the Venerable Antoni Gaudí; the Canary Islands, represented by Saint Peter of Saint Joseph Betancur and Saint Joseph of Anchieta; and the Community of Madrid, represented by Saint Isidore the Farmer, Saint Mary of the Head, and Saint Soledad Torres Acosta. Videos of three other Spanish saints associated with Eucharistic adoration were also released: Saint Teresa of Ávila, Saint Paschal Baylon, and Saint Manuel González.

== Itinerary ==
=== Madrid ===
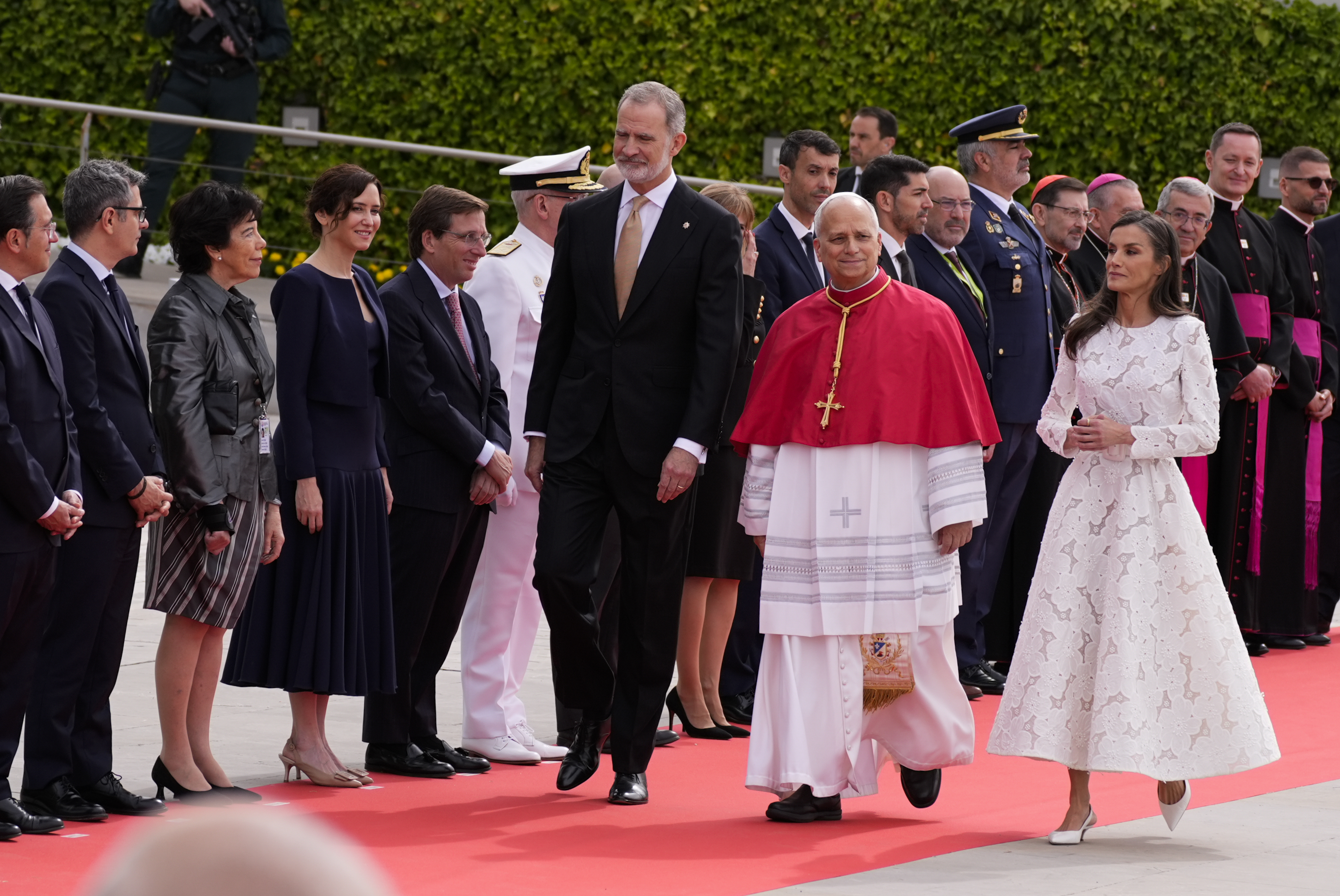
Pope Leo XIV with King Felipe VI and Queen Letizia and other Spanish authorities in his arrival in Madrid, 6 June 2026

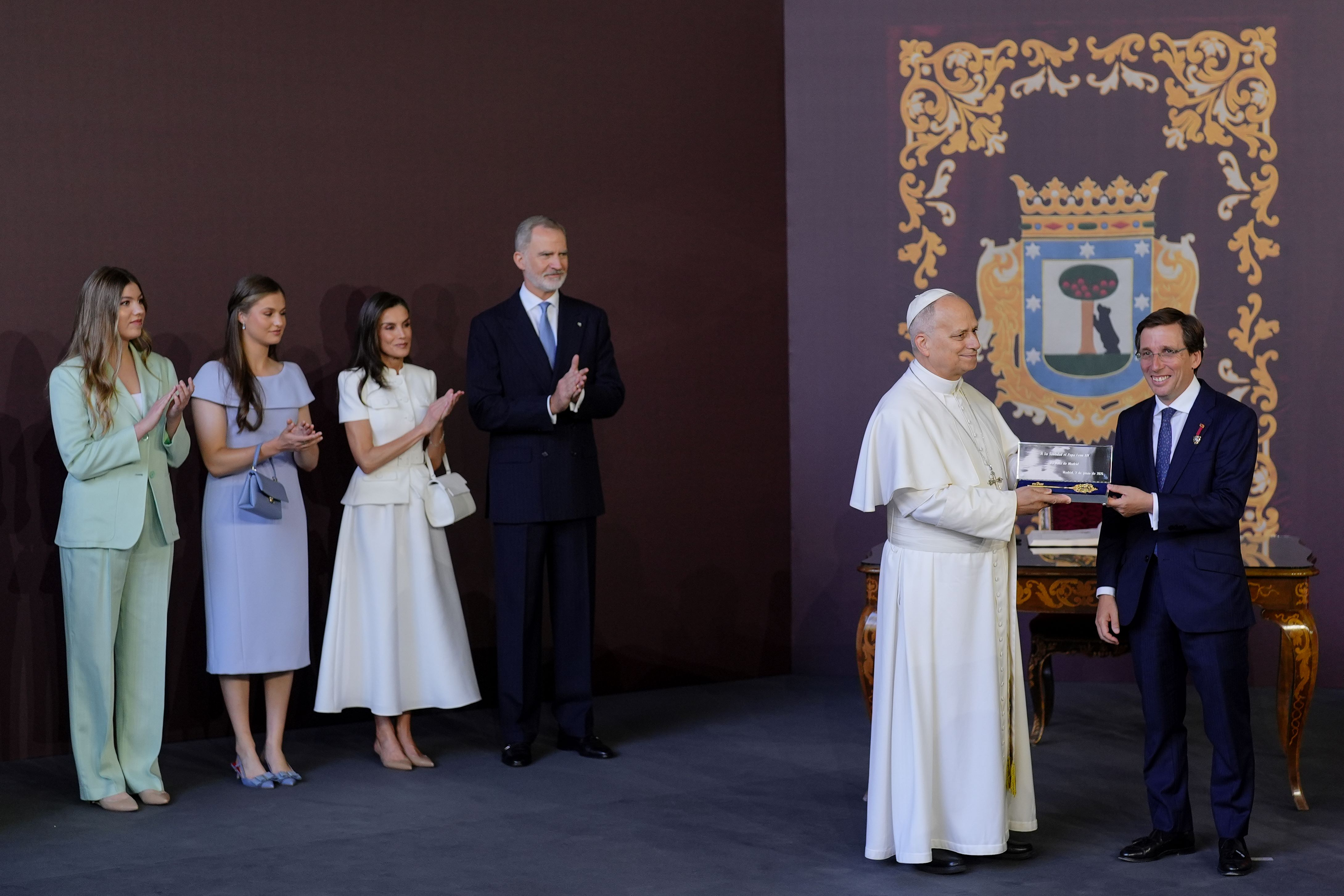
Pope Leo XIV receiving the Golden Key of Madrid from mayor José Luis Martínez-Almeida, in the presence of the Royal Family.

Pope Leo departed Rome's Fiumicino International Airport at 8:13 AM aboard an ITA Airways flight, which is typically used as the papal plane. During the flight, he conducted a brief press conference where he reiterated the need for dialogue in Ukraine and other global conflicts. He was also presented with a drawing made by young patients from Rome's Bambino Gesù pediatric hospital.

Pope Leo arrived in Madrid on 6 June and was received at the Adolfo Suárez Madrid–Barajas Airport by King Felipe VI and Queen Letizia. He was subsequently greeted by prime minister Pedro Sánchez; ministers Félix Bolaños and José Manuel Albares; the ambassador to the Holy See, Isabel Celaá; the president of the Community of Madrid, Isabel Díaz Ayuso, and the mayor of Madrid José Luis Martínez-Almeida, as well as other church officials. Following a brief private audience with the King and Queen of Spain, Pope Leo met with a group of children who had gathered to welcome him.

He was escorted by car by the Escuadrón de Escolta Real until he reached the Royal Palace, where he made a solemn entrance into the Plaza de la Armería and was once again received by the King and Queen of Spain, followed by the Leonor, Princess of Asturias and Infanta Sofía. The Royal Artillery then fired a 21-gun salute, and the national anthems of the Vatican and Spain were played. The reception was attended by representatives of the government, the regional president, the mayor of Madrid, the president of the Supreme Court and the General Council of the Judiciary Isabel Perelló, the president of the Constitutional Court Cándido Conde-Pumpido, as well as the president of the Congress of Deputies Francina Armengol and of the Senate Pedro Rollán. In the throne room, Pope Leo and the Royal Family were greeted by various dignitaries and former prime ministers. Later, in the Hall of Columns, the king and the pope both gave speeches. In his speech, Leo thanked Spain for its commitment to international law, urged leaders to cultivate dialogue over polarization, and emphasized the preservation of religious freedom and the freedom of conscience.

His first day concluded with a visit to the "CEDIA 24 Horas" social project held by Caritas and a prayer vigil with 500,000 young people at the Plaza de Lima. Organized under the apostolic journey's local theme of "Alzada la mirada" ("Look up" in English), the young people event featured songs and reflections focused on spiritual searching of younger generations. A few young people at the vigil were given the opportunity to speak directly to the Pope and ask him questions.

On 7 June the Pope presided over Holy Mass and a Feast of Corpus Christi celebration in the Plaza de Cibeles with over 1.2 million people in attendance. His homily issued a direct challenge to the Spanish government, stating that its rich Catholic history and deep-rooted religious traditions must not become a "museum of the past". He stressed that true adoration requires loving both God and one's neighbors. Following the Mass, Leo led a solemn Corpus Christi procession through the streets of Madrid. Prior to the procession, the pathways were adorned with flower petal tapestries constructed from over 30,000 flowers by local guilds.

He went on to meet with the Augustinian Order and cultural and sporting figures at Madrid Sports Palace. During this event, Pope Leo discussed how the FC Barcelona–Real Madrid rivalry reflects a culture war within Spain, with Real Madrid being viewed as a symbol of central state power, while FC Barcelona is tied to Catalan identity. He alleviated concerns by starting the speech in Catalan, and assured that he would conduct the Mass at the Sagrada Família in the language.

He then met with Spanish prime minister Pedro Sánchez, members of the Parliament, and the bishops of the Spanish Episcopal Conference on 8 June. After lunch, he led a prayer and devotion to Our Lady of Almudena at the Almudena Cathedral, and met with the diocesan community at the Santiago Bernabeu Stadium. The ceremony was presided over by two of the most venerated images in the Spanish capital: the aforementioned Virgin of Almudena, patron saint of Madrid, and the Christ of Medinaceli. On 9 June, he met with volunteers at the IFEMA Exhibition Centre before departing for Barcelona aboard an Iberia flight.

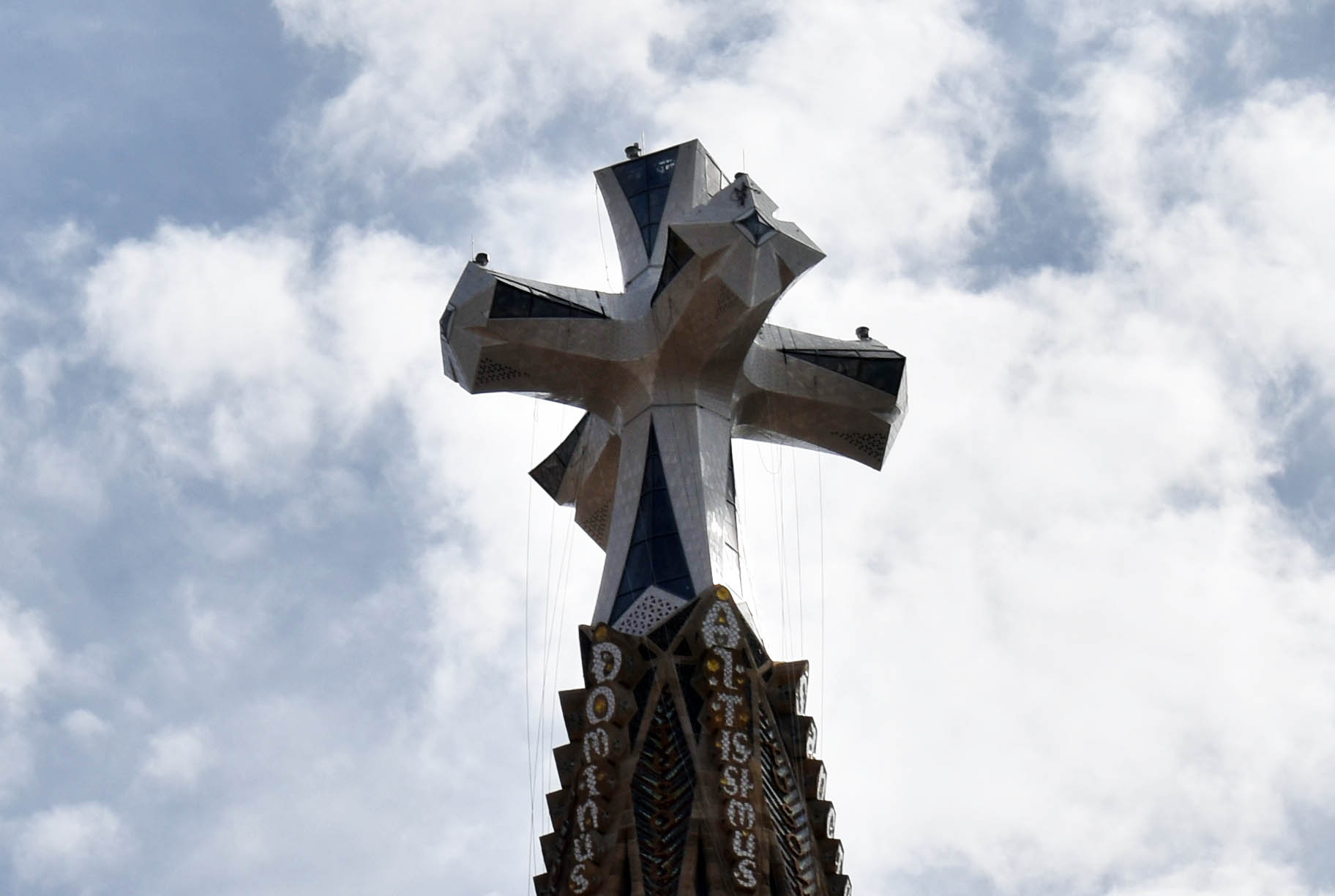
Top of the Tower of Jesus Christ (172,5 m / 566 ft) of the Sagrada Família.

=== Barcelona ===
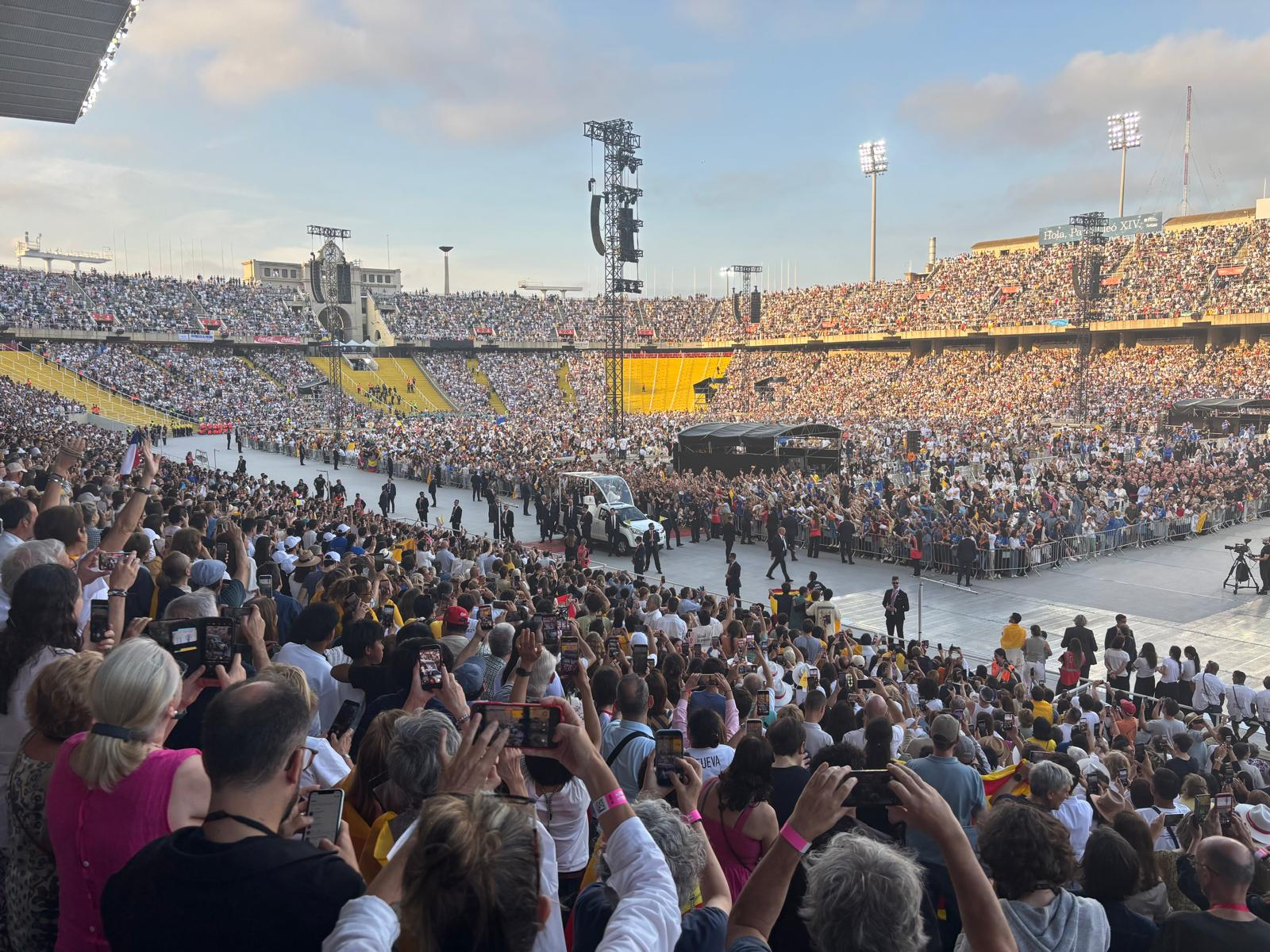
Pope Leo XIV in the Estadi Olímpic Lluís Companys.

Pope Leo arrived at Josep Tarradellas Barcelona–El Prat Airport mid-day on 9 June, and was received by officials including the minister of finance, Arcadi España; the president of Catalonia, Salvador Illa; the president of the Parliament of Catalonia Josep Rull; the archbishop of Barcelona, cardinal Omella, the president of the Province of Barcelona, Lluïsa Moret and the mayor of Barcelona Jaume Collboni. The bells of all the churches in Catalonia rang out as he arrived.

He then made his way to the cathedral where he first entered the Chapel of San Cristo de Lepanto alongside Cardinal and Archbishop Omella, and prayed before the Blessed Sacrament. Subsequently, at the high altar, he celebrated the Liturgy of the Hours, specifically the Sixth Hour, using Catalan, Spanish and Latin; once this was over, Pope Leo went down to pray in the crypt before the tomb of Saint Eulalia of Barcelona. He then greeted the crowd in the Cathedral Square, made his way to the cathedral cloister where he was introduced to the Catalan tradition of the dancing egg (in Catalan ou com balla) used during Corpus Christi, and greeted the authorities of the Parliament of Catalonia. Before having lunch at the adjacent Episcopal Palace, he addressed the crowd once more from the balcony.

In the afternoon, he held an audience with the Catalan president, Salvador Illa, and his wife, who presented to Pope Leo with a copy of the certificate marking the laying of the foundation stone of the Sagrada Família, a reproduction of an ivory doll from the early Christian necropolis in Tarragona, and a facsimile of Homilies d'Organyà, a 12th-century liturgical document containing one of the earliest writings in Catalan. That afternoon, Pope Leo also met with members of the Order of Saint Augustine. In the evening, Pope Leo led a vigil at the Lluís Companys Olympic Stadium in front of more than 40,000 people. Earlier, he blessed ambulances that would bring aid to Ukraine, organised by Sister Lucia Caram. During the vigil, there was a performance of castells (the Catalan human towers) by the Castellers de Vilafranca.

The following day on 10 June, he visited the Brians 1 Penitentiary Center to meet with prisoners, and travelled to the Santa Maria de Montserrat Abbey. In the afternoon, he met with the diocesans and local welfare organizations in the Church of Sant Agustí located in the Raval.

==== Montserrat ====
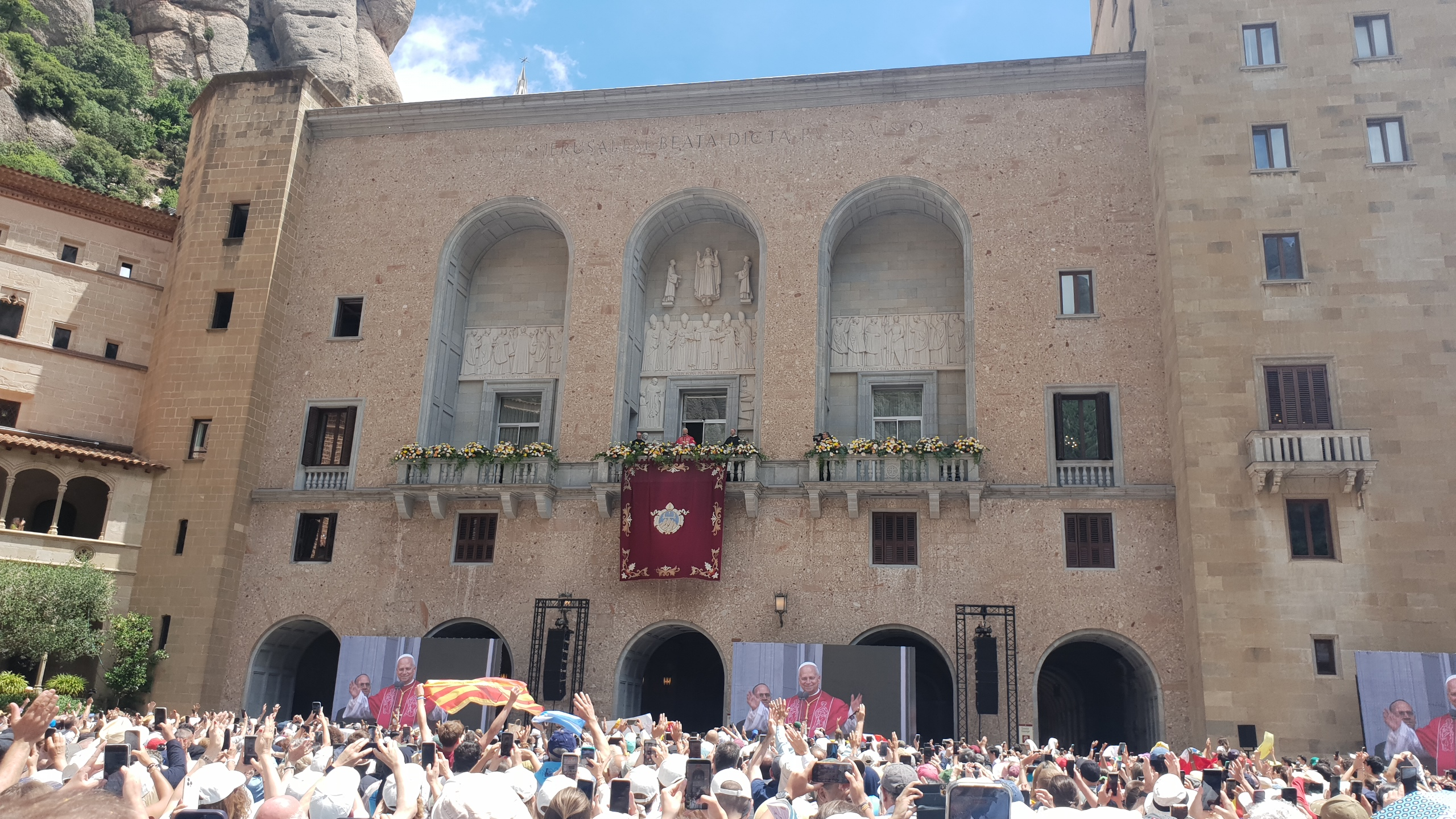
Pope Leo XIV appearing on the balcony of the main façade of the Abbey of Santa Maria de Montserrat to address the pilgrims gathered in Plaça de Santa Maria, 10 June 2026.

At midday on 10 June, Leo XIV travelled to the Santa Maria de Montserrat Abbey in Catalonia. It was the first papal visit to the sanctuary in 44 years, since Pope John Paul II presided over a Celebration of the Word there on 7 November 1982, and only the second papal pilgrimage to the sanctuary on record since the monastery was founded. The abbey described the visit as the culmination of its millennium celebrations.

Attendance required advance booking, with all reserved places located in the exterior squares of the monastery, from which the ceremony was followed on large screens. The Pope arrived by car at the Mirador dels Apòstols and continued to the abbey in an open popemobile, stopping several times to greet those gathered along the route. He was received in the atrium by schoolchildren from Catalan Christian schools and by the abbot of Montserrat, Manel Gasch, to the sound of the abbey bells. Close to 8,000 people attended, many of them arriving from early morning by cable car and rack railway, as road access was restricted to accredited vehicles.

Leo XIV presided over the Holy Rosary with the Glorious Mysteries, traditionally prayed on Wednesdays, followed by the sanctuary's midday prayer with the Salve Regina and the Virolai sung by the Escolania de Montserrat. He venerated the image of the Virgin of Montserrat as the choir sang the closing verses of the Virolai.

Speaking partly in Catalan, the Pope recalled his years as parish priest of a parish dedicated to Santa María de Montserrat in Trujillo, Peru, and said that la Moreneta had always accompanied him. He thanked Catalonia for welcoming people from other countries, saying it showed how to bring everyone into a single family. Before the end of the public part of the visit he addressed the crowd from the balcony of the monastery façade and gave a blessing. The visit concluded with a private lunch with the Benedictine community and the choirboys.

==== Sagrada Família ====
In the evening, the Pope went to the Basilica of the Sagrada Família to inaugurate and bless the recently-completed Tower of Jesus Christ, considered the main act of the visit. During his route in popemobile through the Eixample district, Leo XIV was greeted by crowds of about 120,000 people on the streets.

On arrival, Leo XIV was greeted by King Felipe VI and Queen Letizia, president of the Government Pedro Sánchez, a Sagrada Família Construction Board representative and other authorities. A young blind girl with Leber's syndrome explained to the Pope, King and Queen the architecture of the Tower of Jesus Christ, using a tactile model, and gifted the Pope with a drawing representing how she perceives the tower. Leo XIV then headed to the Crypt of the Sagrada Família and prayed on Antoni Gaudí's tomb, coinciding with the centenary of his death on 10 June 1926.

Leo XIV then entered the basilica followed by 200 bishops and offered a Solemn Mass in conmemoration of Gaudí's death centenary. The Mass was attended by 4,000 people inside and 4,000 people outside, plus all the people that were outside the Sagrada Família complex. Relevant spanish authorities included King Felipe VI, Queen Letizia, president of the Government Pedro Sánchez (attending a mass for the first time as president), president of Catalonia Salvador Illa, mayor of Barcelona Jaume Collboni, Spanish government ministers, Catalan government ministers, and deputies of the Congress of Deputies and the Parliament of Catalonia. Foreign authorities included prime minister of Andorra Xavier Espot, president of Lithuania Gitanas Nausėda and president of Cyprus Nikos Christodoulides (as Cyprus holding the Presidency of the Council of the European Union).

After the Mass, Leo XIV exited the basilica to inaugurate and bless the Tower of Jesus Christ, main and tallest tower of the Sagrada Família with a height of 172.5 metres (566 ft), making it the tallest church in the world. Following the blessing, a musical and lightning spectacle culminated the pope's visit to Barcelona: the Escolania singing, handheld lamps, interior light illuminating towers and reflecting the stained glass, an orchestra, drones and fireworks. After the cross at the top of the Tower of Jesus Christ was illuminated, the drones draw Gaudí's face on the sky, alongside with his quote in catalan "Primer l'amor, després la tècnica" ("First love, then technique").

=== Canary Islands ===
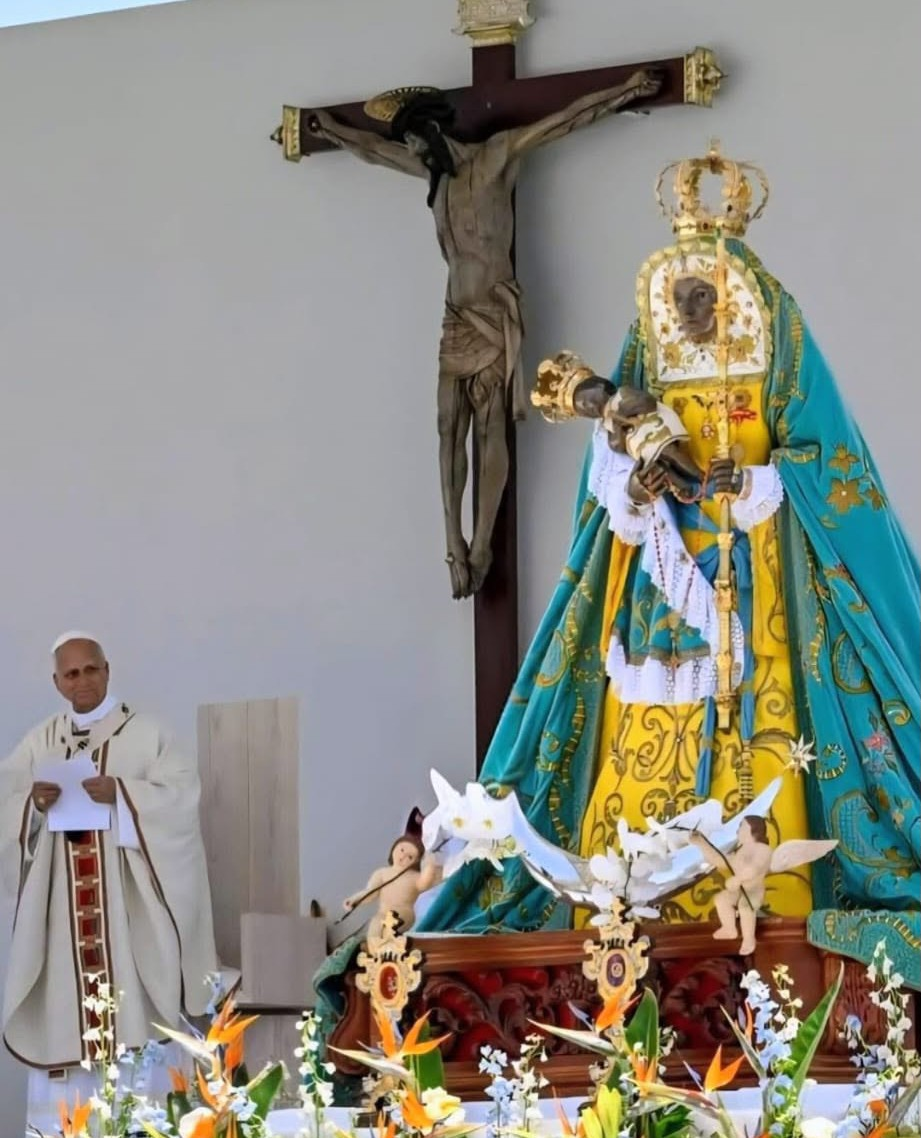
Pope Leo XIV with the Virgin of Candelaria, patron saint of the Canary Islands. Behind them, the Christ of La Laguna. Closing Mass of his apostolic visit to Spain in the Port of Santa Cruz de Tenerife.

Leo departed Barcelona aboard an Iberia flight in the morning on 11 June, and arrived at Gando Air Base on Gran Canaria several hours later. Once in Gran Canaria, he met with organizations working with migrants at the port of Arguineguín. Afterwards, he met with diocesan priests, deacons, and pastoral workers in the Cathedral of Santa Anna in Las Palmas. In the late afternoon, the Pope held Holy Mass at the Gran Canaria Stadium, before the images of the Virgin of the Pine, patron saint of the island and its diocese, and the Christ of Telde.

On the last day of his journey, 12 June, Pope Leo departed Gran Canaria aboard an Iberia flight and landed at Tenerife North–Ciudad de La Laguna Airport in the morning, followed by a meeting with migrants at the Las Raíces center. Leo also met with local organizations helping the migrants at the Plaza del Cristo de La Laguna, and held Holy Mass at the Port of Santa Cruz de Tenerife, before the image of the Virgin of Candelaria, patron saint of the Canary Islands, and the Christ of La Laguna, another image of great devotion in the islands. Also present were relics of the only two saints born in the archipelago to date: Saint Peter of Betancur and Saint Joseph of Anchieta. In the afternoon, he attended a farewell ceremony at Tenerife Norte Airport before leaving to Rome. Due to a technical problem with the Iberia Airbus A320 that was supposed to take him back to Rome, King Felipe VI offered the Pope the Spanish Air Force Falcon 900 that planned to take him back to Rome. Both the papal entourage and the King had to wait for replacement planes to arrive from Madrid for their return journeys.

This was the first visit by a pope to the Canary Islands, although in 1934 cardinal Pacelli visited the island of Gran Canaria representing the pope five years before being elected Pope Pius XII. Similarly, Robert Prevost (now Leo XIV) visited the island of Tenerife twice before his election as pope, as prior general of the Order of Saint Augustine between 2001 and 2013. He stayed in the city of Puerto de la Cruz, where the only Augustinian community in the Canary Islands is located.

== Broadcast ==
Radiotelevisión Española (RTVE), Radio Televisión Madrid (RTVM), Corporació Catalana de Mitjans Audiovisuals (CCMA), and Radio Televisión Canaria (RTVC), assumed in a coordinated manner the production of the official live television and radio feeds of all the public events of the visit, with each one carrying out the production of certain events, and with RTVE in charge of coordination as well as distribution to other broadcasters.

RTVE deployed one of its largest operations for the visit, with Televisión Española (TVE) in charge of the television production and Radio Nacional de España (RNE) of the radio production. RTVE covered live all the public events of the visit, and produced the assigned events, with a workforce of 660 people, 17 mobile units, and 170 cameras.

External videos
- Post-blessing spectacle
- "Gaudí returns made of drones to see the Sagrada Família illuminated like never before" (3Cat)

CCMA through Televisió de Catalunya (TVC) produced the live television feed of the blessing of the Tower of Jesus Christ of the Sagrada Família, and the post-blessing spectacle which combined an Escolania, an orchestra, the lighting of the building, handheld lamps, drones, and fireworks. TVC used innovative techniques for UHD-HDR HLG broadcasting, live color grading, and cinema-like techniques to process the image and the diversity of lightning during the 10 minute spectacle.

RTVC carried out its largest broadcast to date for the visit, with Televisión Canaria producing the official live television feed of many of the events held in the Canary Islands.

== Reactions ==
=== Ecclesiastical officials and bodies ===
- Cardinal Pietro Parolin, the Vatican Secretary of State, expressed strong support and optimism about the apostolic journey in an interview prior to the Pope's departure. He viewed the journey as an opportunity to spread Leo's mission of unity and peace, and reinforced the Holy See's diplomatic priorities regarding Mediterranean Europe and the Canary Islands.
- Pope Leo, following the Angelus prayer on 14 June, thanked Spain for its “warm welcome and devotion” and King Felipe VI in particular. He concluded by saying, "May God always bless Spain!"
