= Plaza del Cristo de La Laguna =

Public square in the Canary Islands

Coordinates: 28°29′34″N 16°18′47″W

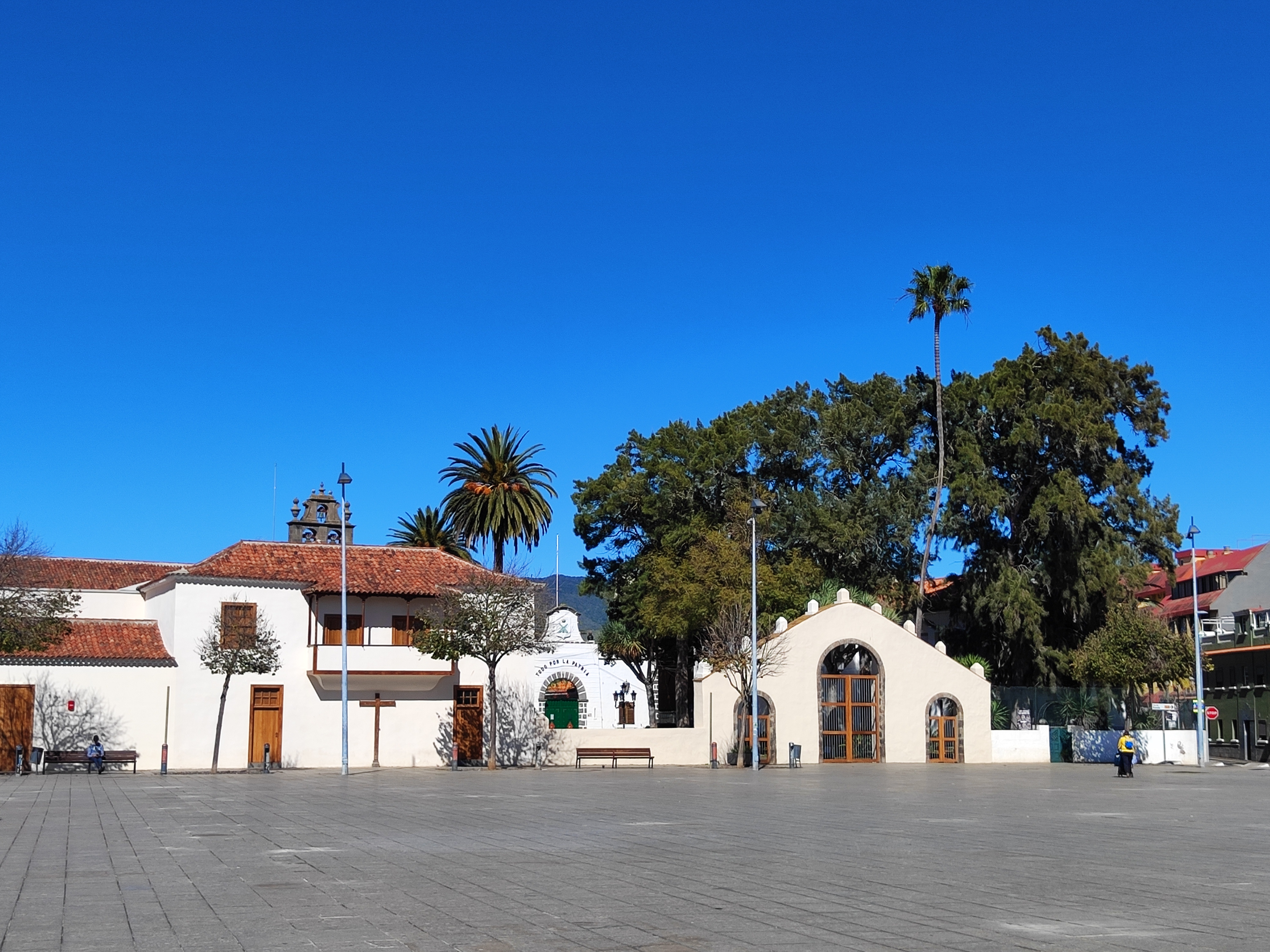
Plaza del Cristo de La Laguna and Sanctuary of Christ of La Laguna

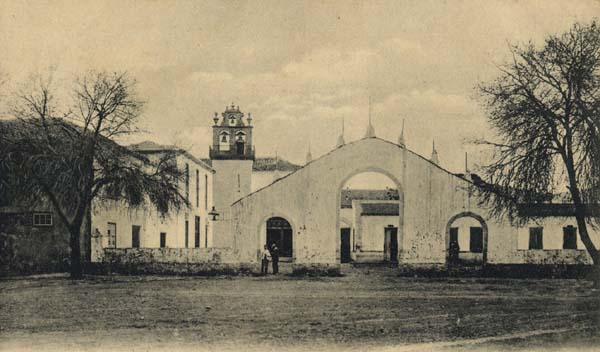
Old photographs of the square and Real Santuario del Cristo de La Laguna

Plaza del Cristo de La Laguna is a square in the city of San Cristóbal de La Laguna (on the island of Tenerife, Canary Islands, Spain). It is one of the largest and most important squares of the Canary Islands.

This square is considered one of the "main squares" of the island of Tenerife, together with the Plaza de España in Santa Cruz de Tenerife and the Plaza de la Patrona de Canarias in Candelaria.

This square until recently marked the boundary between the city of La Laguna and agricultural area. The square was used until the last century as a field of military exercises.

In the surroundings of the current square was the historic and disappeared Hospital of San Sebastián, which played an important role in the reception of patients during the epidemic of bubonic plague that broke out in the city in 1582.

However, the plaza is known mainly because its banks including Real Santuario del Cristo de La Laguna church, where the venerated image of Cristo de La Laguna, which is highly revered by all Canary Islanders. Today in this square is the municipal market.

The square was visited on June 12, 2026, by Pope Leo XIV during his visit to Tenerife as part of his apostolic journey to Spain. The Pope met with organizations dedicated to the integration of migrants on the island.
