= Real Santuario del Cristo de La Laguna =

Roman Catholic church in the Canary Islands

Coordinates: 28°29′37″N 16°18′45″W

Real Santuario del Santísimo Cristo de La Laguna
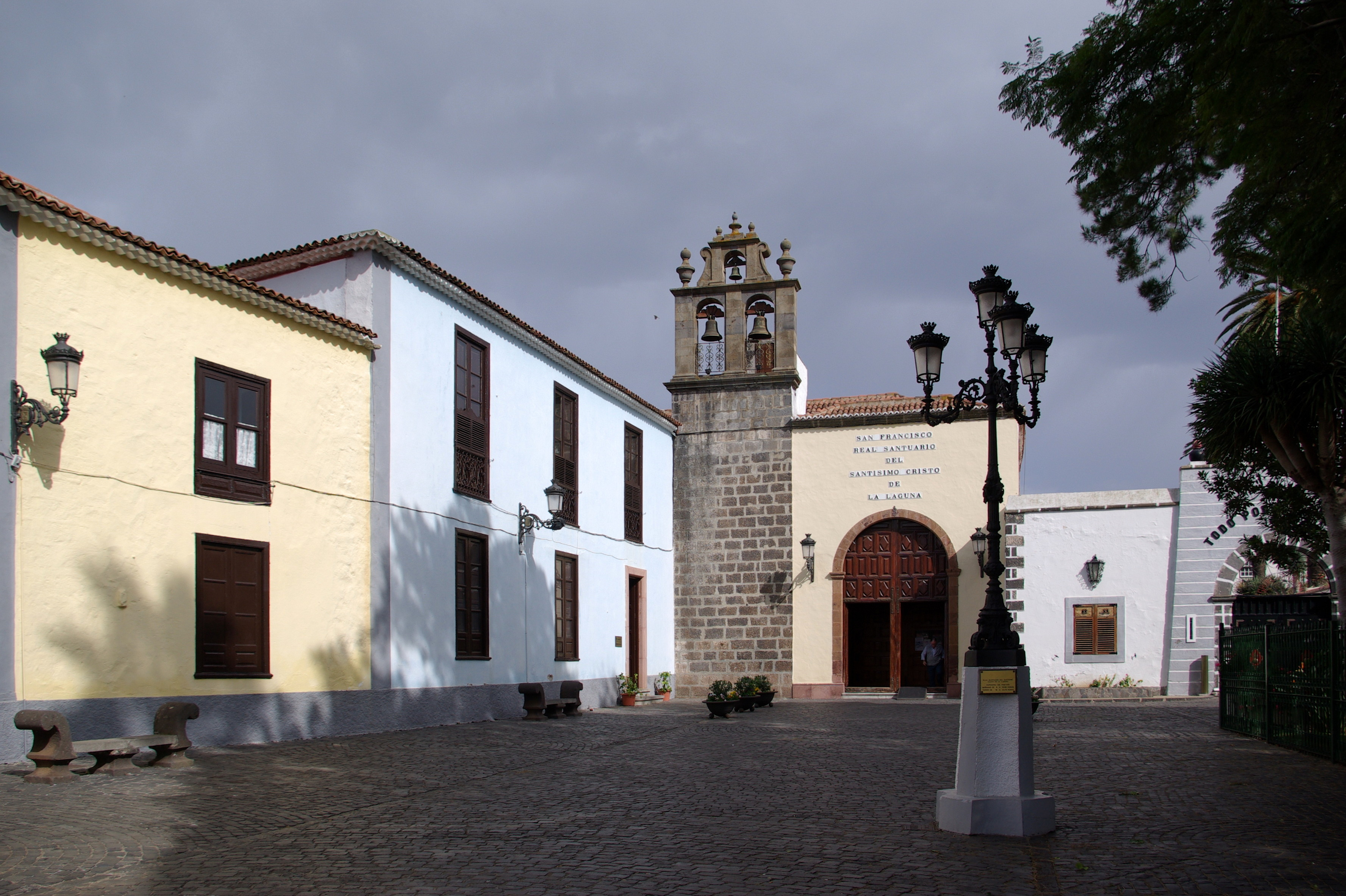
- Facade of the Royal Shrine

Religion
- Affiliation: Roman Catholic Church
- Diocese: Diocese of San Cristóbal de La Laguna
- Province: Archdiocese of Seville
- Ecclesiastical or organisational status: Royal shrine and conventual church

Location
- Location: San Cristóbal de La Laguna, Spain.
- Interactive map of Real Santuario del Santísimo Cristo de La Laguna

Architecture
- Type: church
- Style: Colonial of the Canary Islands
- Completed: 1580
- Direction of façade: South

Website
- www.cristodelalaguna.com

Real Santuario del Santísimo Cristo de La Laguna (Royal Sanctuary of the Christ of La Laguna) is a Roman Catholic church located in the city of San Cristóbal de La Laguna, Tenerife (Canary Islands, Spain). The sanctuary is famous for housing the image of the Cristo de La Laguna, a devotional image of the Canary Islands.

This temple throughout its history was enriched by the Popes with indulgences which are granted to the Basilica of St. John Lateran in Rome. Next to the Royal Shrine is the Plaza del Cristo de La Laguna, the largest square of the city.

== History ==
Built in 1580 and founded by Alonso Fernández de Lugo, it is a site of Cultural Interest. The church has a nave, high and narrow, about 46 m long and 7 m wide. This was the first Franciscan monastery established on the island of Tenerife.

The entrance is through a door beneath the choir loft. The back wall is occupied by a large silver altarpiece with a central niche on the bottom of carved wood and gold cross rests with the image of Christ.

Real Shrine of the Cristo de La Laguna, was one of the earliest Christian shrines in the Canary Islands to receive the title and title of "Royalty". It was December 19, 1906, by King Alfonso XIII, on a visit to the archipelago together with the Marines, María Teresa de Borbón y Fernando of Bavaria.

On November 22, 2006 was visited by the then King of Spain, Juan Carlos I of Spain and his wife Sofia of Greece, who are honorary members of the brotherhood as is the Pope of Rome.

In 2008, the temple wore a huge flag of Vatican City to commemorate the centenary of the "Title Pontifical" granted by the Pope in Rome in 1908 to the Pontificia, Real y Venerable Esclavitud del Santísimo Cristo de La Laguna, the Brotherhood of Cristo de La Laguna.

From 2014 the sanctuary has had an exact replica of the Shroud of Turin, of which there are only two exact copies in Spain. This reproduction was donated by the Delegation in the Canary Islands of the Centro Español de Sindonología (Spanish Center Sindonology) and is the only one in the Canary Islands. It is currently the most accurate replica of the original. In 2000, the Shrine of the Cristo de La Laguna witnessed the first mass veneration of the Shroud in the Canary Islands, commemorating the exposition of the Shroud in Turin Cathedral on the occasion of the Jubilee Year.

Next to the Royal Shrine is the Military Barracks, headquarters of the Chief of Military Area Command and the Canary Islands.

== Gallery ==
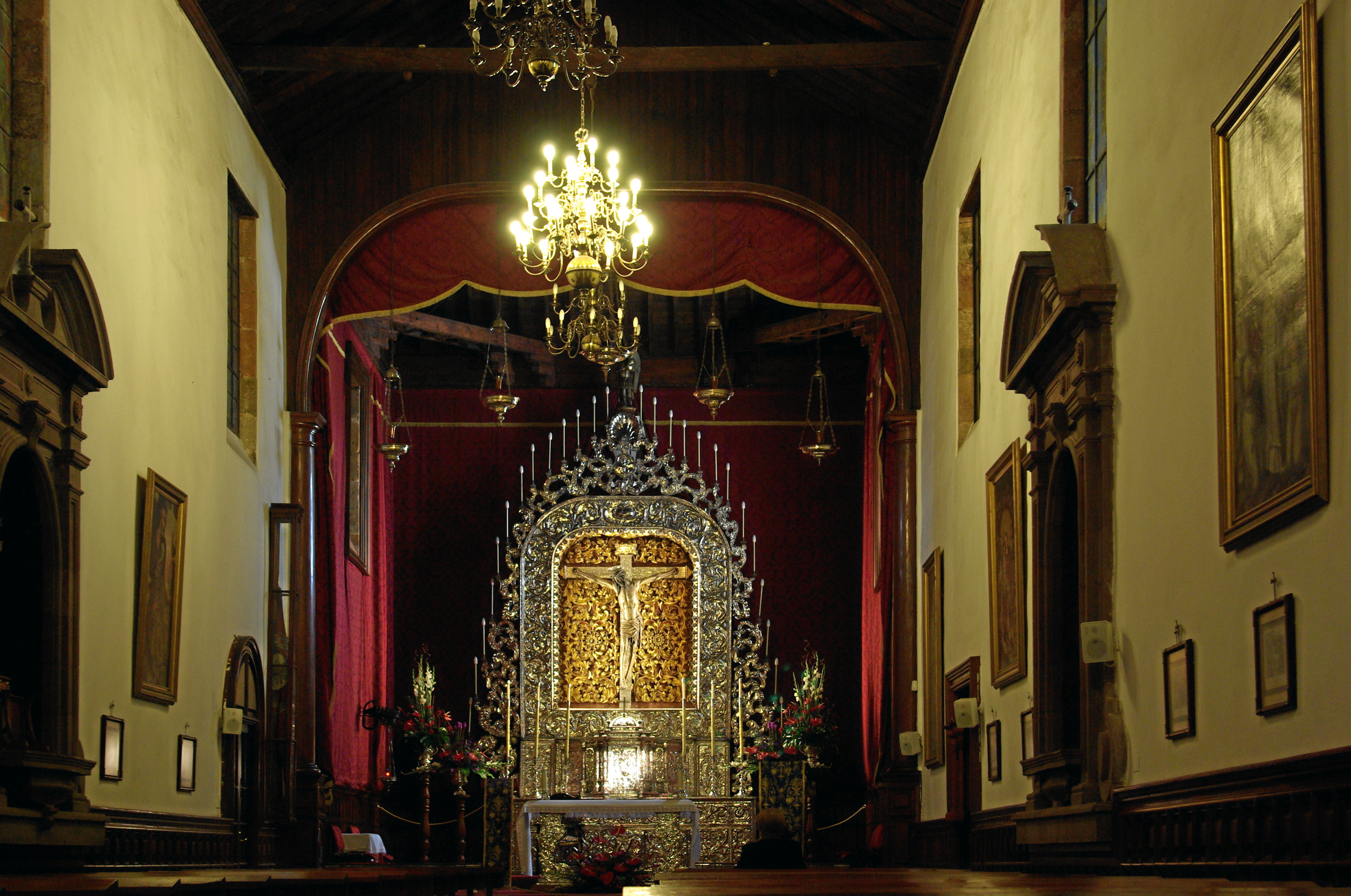
Interior of the Sanctuary with the image of Christ on the altar.

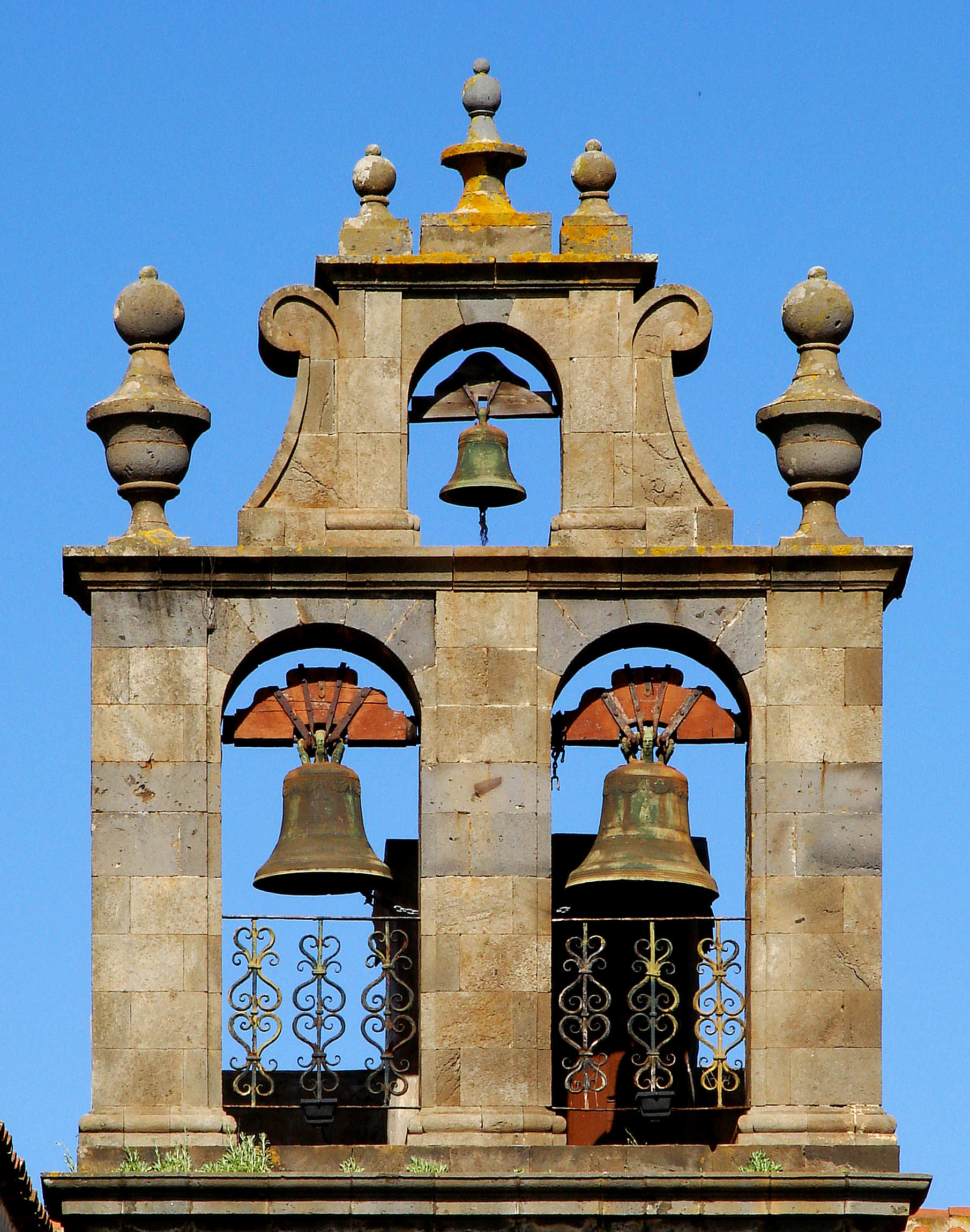
Bell of the Shrine.

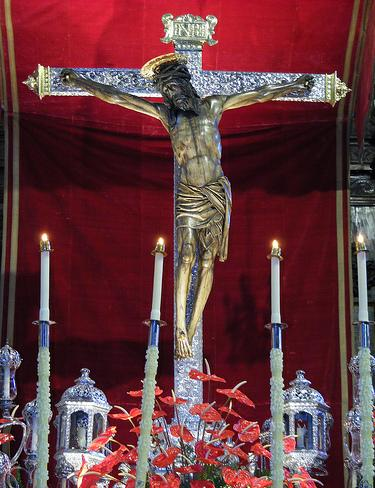
Cristo de La Laguna

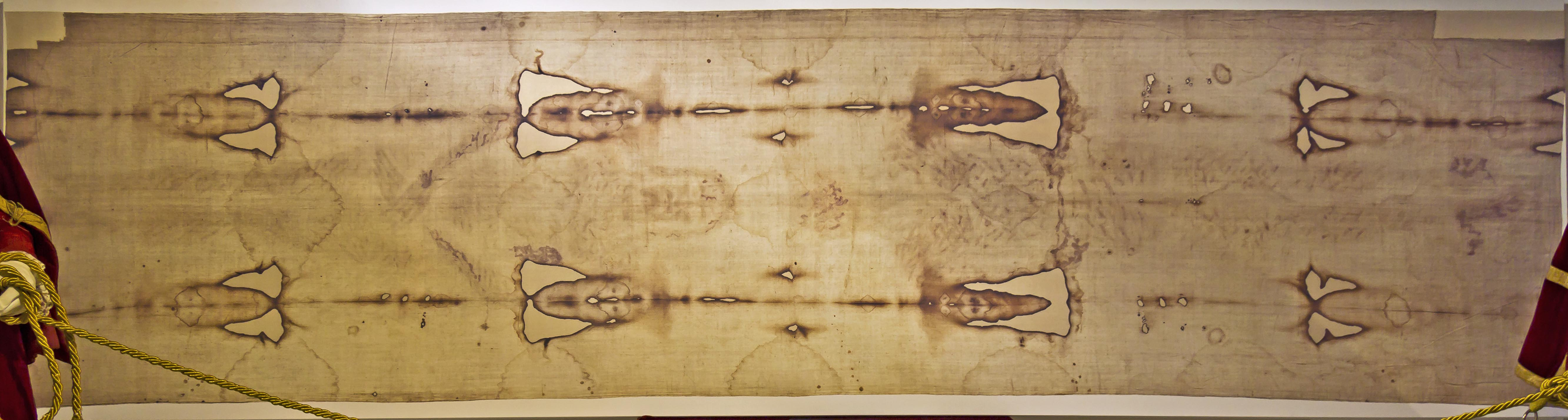
Replica of the Shroud of Turin. It is located at the Museum of the Sanctuary.

== See also ==
- Roman Catholic Diocese of San Cristóbal de La Laguna
- Cristo de La Laguna
- Plaza del Cristo de La Laguna
- Cathedral of La Laguna
- Basilica of Candelaria
