= Cristo de La Laguna =

Sculpture in San Cristóbal de La Laguna, Canary Islands, Spain

Christ of La Laguna
- Santísimo Cristo de La Laguna (Spanish)
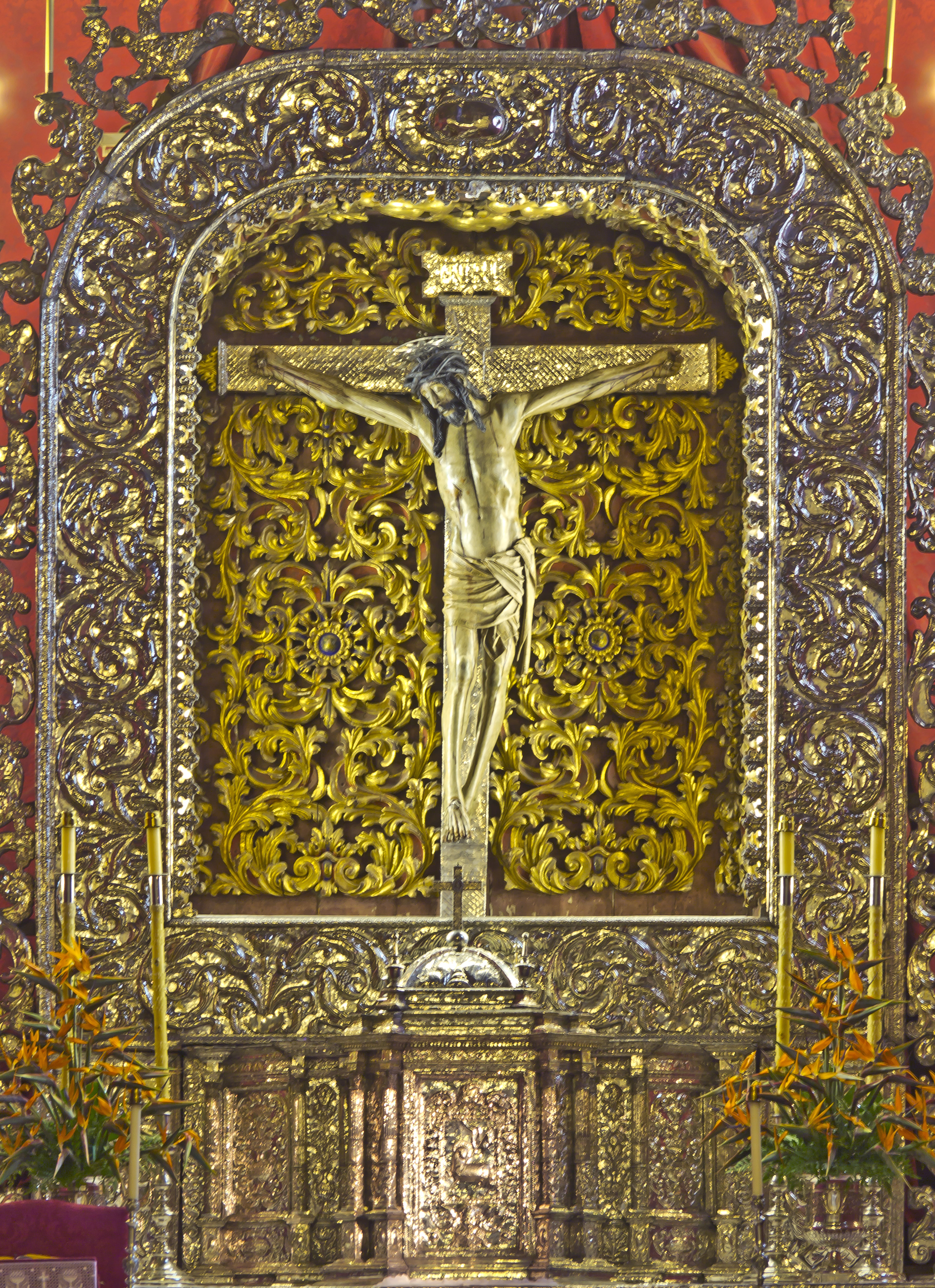
- Artist: Louis Van Der Vule
- Year: 1510 - 1514
- Type: Wood
- Location: Real Santuario del Santísimo Cristo de La Laguna

The Cristo de La Laguna (Christ of La Laguna in English) is a wooden sculpture that represents the crucified Jesus of Nazareth. It is located in the Royal Sanctuary of the Christ, in the city of San Cristóbal de La Laguna (Tenerife, Canary Islands, Spain).

It is the most venerated image of Jesus in the Canary Islands. It is considered one of the most artistically valuable religious sculptures in Spain, and one of the most artistically valuable representations of Crucifixion of Jesus in Europe.

== History ==
There are many theories on the origin of the figure of Christ. It was Professor Joaquin Yarza who assumed that its origins were northern European, although he did not deny its Sevillian origins. The latest studies conducted by Professor Francisco Galante Gomez confirm that the figure came from the flourishing workshops of Antwerp, thus making it of Flemish-Brabanzon origin, and it was sculpted by Louis Van Der Vule around 1514.

It is claimed that the image of the Christ went to Venice before coming to Tenerife, as the city was a major trading and economic centre at the time. From there, it was taken to Barcelona and from Barcelona to Cádiz, where it was given temporary accommodation in the church of La Vera Cruz in Sanlúcar de Barrameda. After finally come to Tenerife in 1520.

Over the centuries, the solemn worship of this image of Christ has made it one of the most venerated religious images in the entire archipelago. This image has been taken in rogatives through the streets of the city in multitude of occasions throughout the history, generally to ask for its intercession in diverse public calamities like epidemics, plagues or droughts that were produced in the island of Tenerife.

Monsignor Domingo Pérez Cáceres received his episcopal consecration before the image of the Christ of La Laguna on September 21, 1947, that became the first bishop born in Tenerife that governed his own native diocese. The image of the Christ had been exceptionally transferred to the Cathedral of La Laguna for such occasion a few days before.

The church of the Christ is currently classified as a Royal Sanctuary, and is highly popular with church goers. It was returned to the Franciscan community of the annex to the Convent of San Miguel de las Victorias. The church of the Christ in the course of history was enriched by the Popes pardons that are granted to the Basilica of St. John Lateran in Rome. The "Real Santuario del Santísimo Cristo de La Laguna" was listed as a Cultural Monument in 2005 by the Canary Islands Government.

In 2024 the Christ of La Laguna was declared by the Military Archbishop of Spain, Monsignor Don Juan Antonio Aznárez Cobo, as patron saint of the Field Artillery Regiment number 93 of Tenerife (RACA 93).

The festival of the Christ of La Laguna is celebrated every September 14.

=== Apostolic visit by Pope Leo XIV to Tenerife 2026 ===
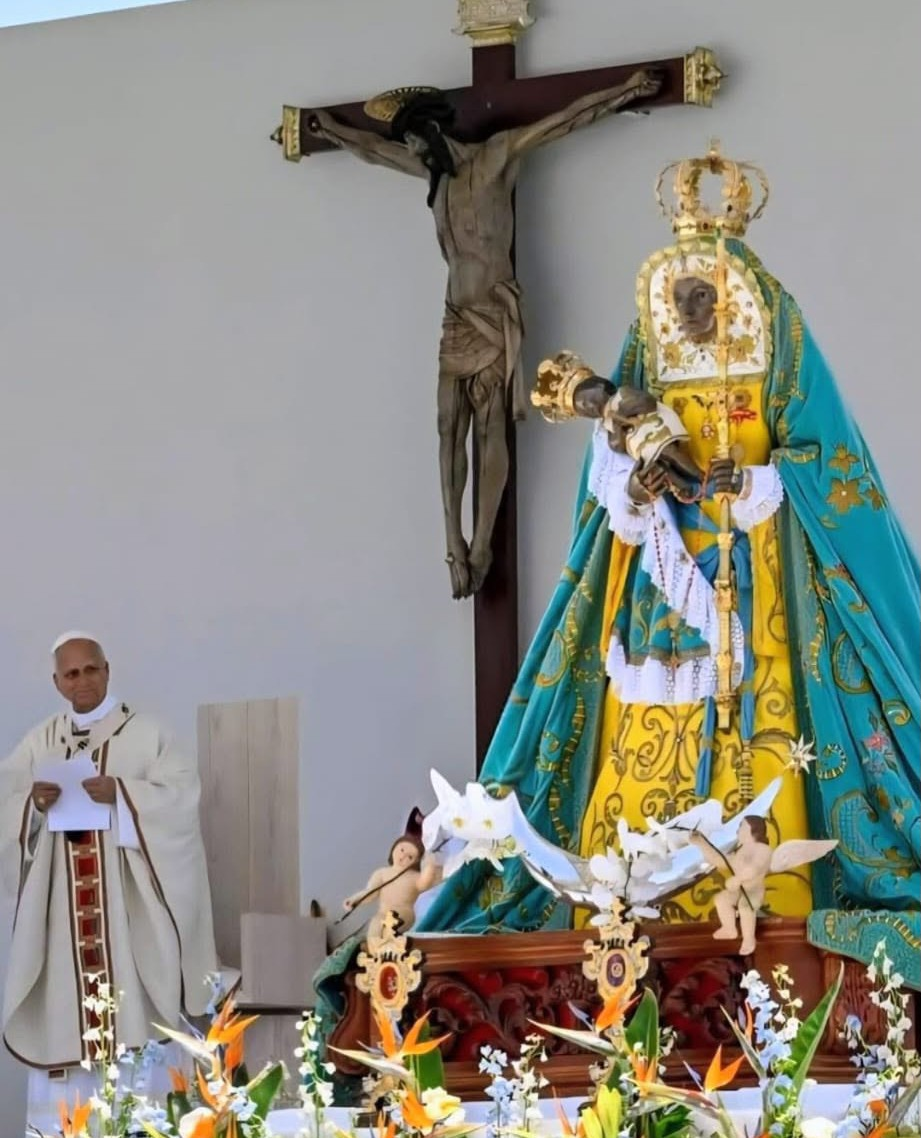
Pope Leo XIV with the Virgin of Candelaria, patron saint of the Canary Islands. Behind them, the Christ of La Laguna. Closing Mass of his apostolic visit to Spain in the Port of Santa Cruz de Tenerife.

During the farewell Mass of Pope Leo XIV's apostolic journey to Spain on June 12, 2026, the pontiff venerated the image of Christ of La Laguna, that presided over the ceremony, along with the Virgin of Candelaria, patron saint of Canary Islands. The ceremony was held in the port of Santa Cruz de Tenerife, and this marked the first papal visit to the archipelago. It was a historic moment, as it was the first time in 500 years that the image of Christ left the city of La Laguna.

== Legends about its origin ==
There are alternatives legends that attempt to explain the origin of this enigmatic sculpture. Some of these legends say that the image of Christ of La Laguna was sculpted by angels and even by the Evangelist Saint Luke. Fray Luís de Quirós said the image of Christ of La Laguna was taken to the island of Tenerife by Saint Michael Archangel. In both cases these "holy sculptors" sculpted image with facial features that had Jesus Christ at the time of his crucifixion.

Another legend tells that a stormy night the religious from the Convent of San Miguel de las Victorias (today Sanctuary of Christ) felt knocking the door, and when they opened it found a large box, the bright lights inside out. After opening the box found in the image of Christ, this fact was taken as a miracle.

== Brotherhood of Cristo de La Laguna ==
From the image of Christ is responsible for a fraternity is the largest of the Canary Islands, call: Pontificia, Real y Venerable Esclavitud del Santísimo Cristo de La Laguna. The Spanish King Alfonso XIII to this brotherhood Awarded the title of "Royal" on 19 December 1906, and Pope Pius X gave him the title of "Pontifical" on 15 February 1908.

== Gallery ==
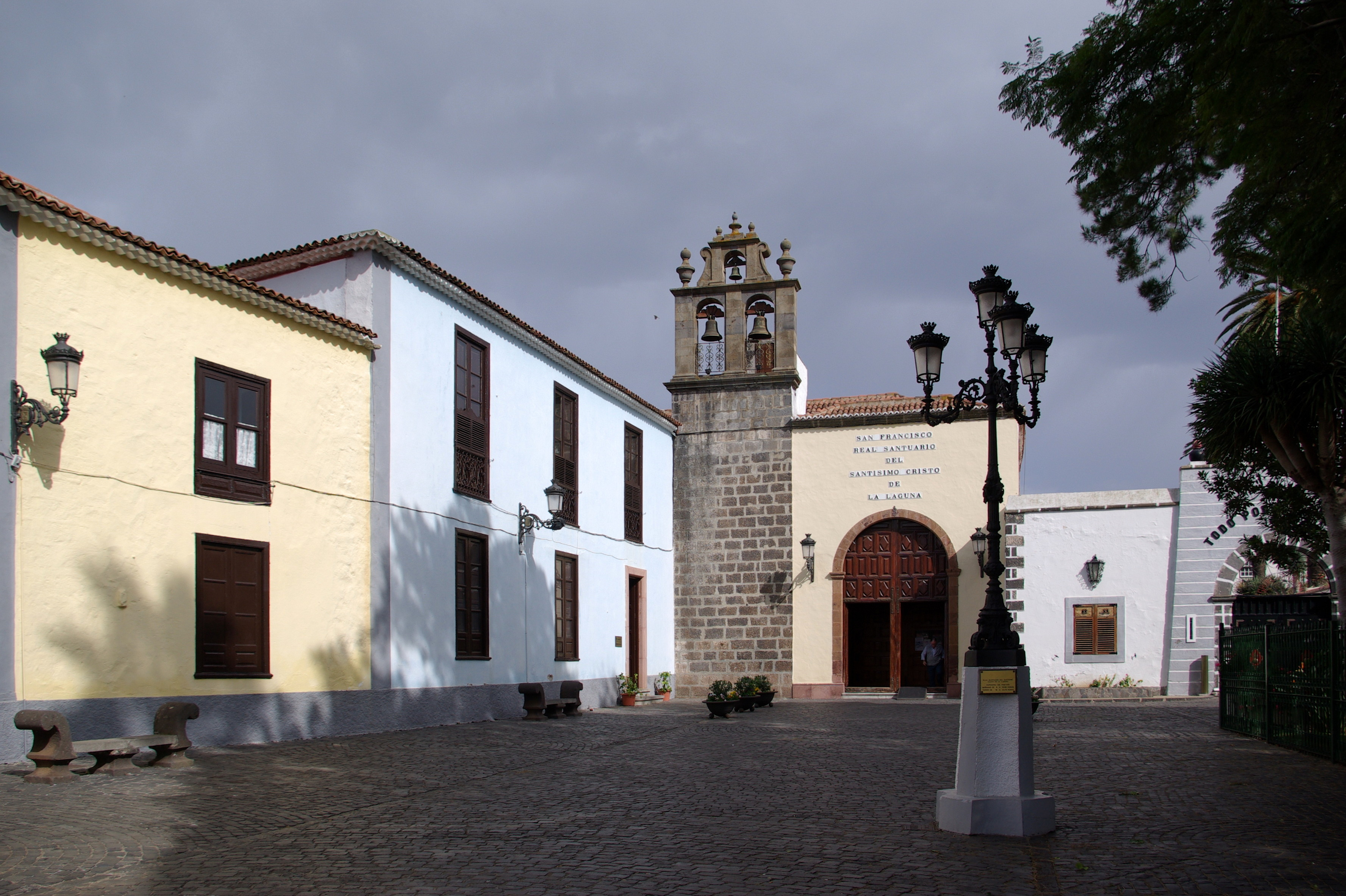
Exterior of the Shrine of Christ.

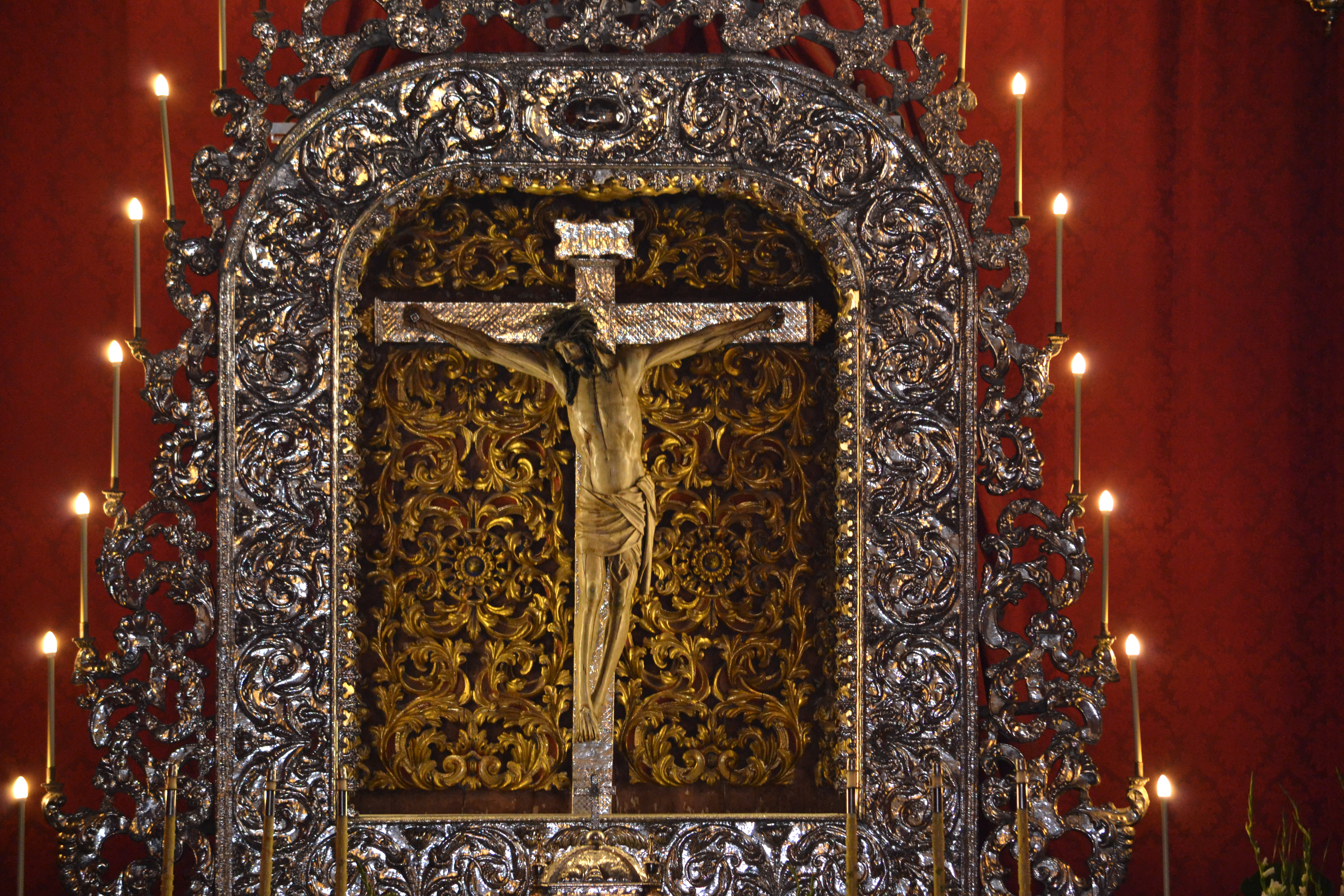
The image of Christ on the altar.

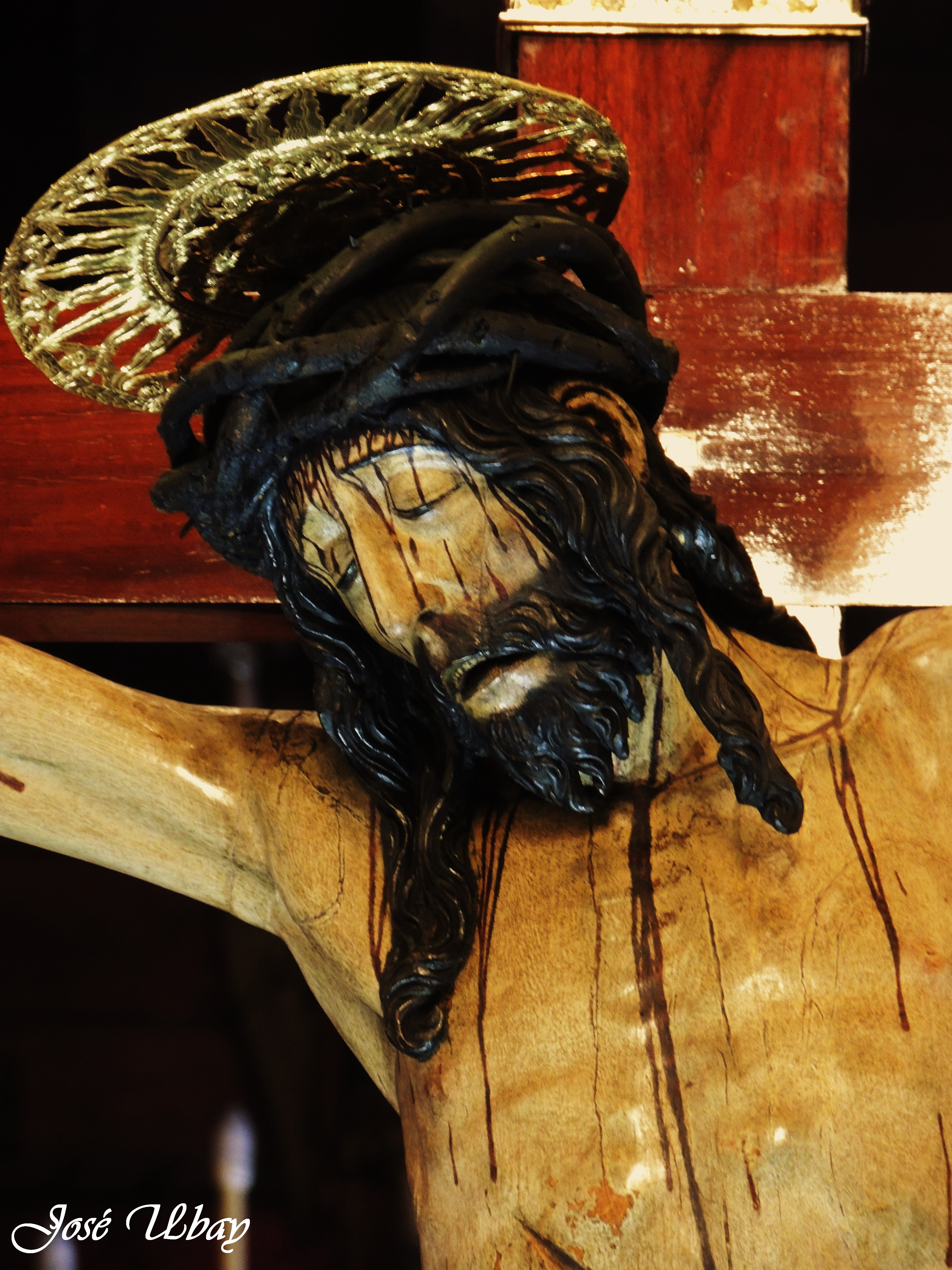
Sculpture of Christ after restoration.

== See also ==
- List of statues of Jesus
- San Cristóbal de La Laguna
- Real Santuario del Santísimo Cristo de La Laguna
- Virgin of Candelaria
