= Las Raíces center =

First Arrivals center for migrants in San Cristóbal de La Laguna

The Las Raíces Reception Center it is a First Arrivals center for migrants located in the municipality of San Cristóbal de La Laguna, on the island of Tenerife (Spain).

== History and characteristics ==
The Las Raíces barracks were previously used to house migrants during the so-called "cayucos crisis" in 2006. However, its current function was designed by the Spanish government in 2021 as a large-scale reception camp in response to the emergency situation caused by the massive arrival of migrants from Africa to the Canary Islands.

It is located on the Rodeo Alto road, less than one kilometer from Tenerife North Airport, and is the largest migrant reception center in the Canary Islands and Spain. The camp housed up to 2,500 people at the peak of the migration pressure in 2024.

=== Visit of Pope Leo XIV ===
On June 12, 2026, the center was visited by Pope Leo XIV during his visit to Tenerife as part of his apostolic journey to Spain. The Pope's address was delivered in French, as many of the migrants came from Francophone Africa. His speech focused on welcoming and adapting, citing the examples of the two Canarian saints, Peter of Saint Joseph Betancur and Joseph of Anchieta, as two migrants who embarked on an unknown journey to proclaim the Gospel in the Americas, knowing how to give what they had and also embrace the new things offered to them. With this example, the Pope urged migrants to offer their culture while being willing to receive what is offered to them in their new home.
