= Port of Santa Cruz de Tenerife =

Port in the island of Tenerife, Province of Santa Cruz de Tenerife

Coordinates: 28°27′37″N 16°14′47″W

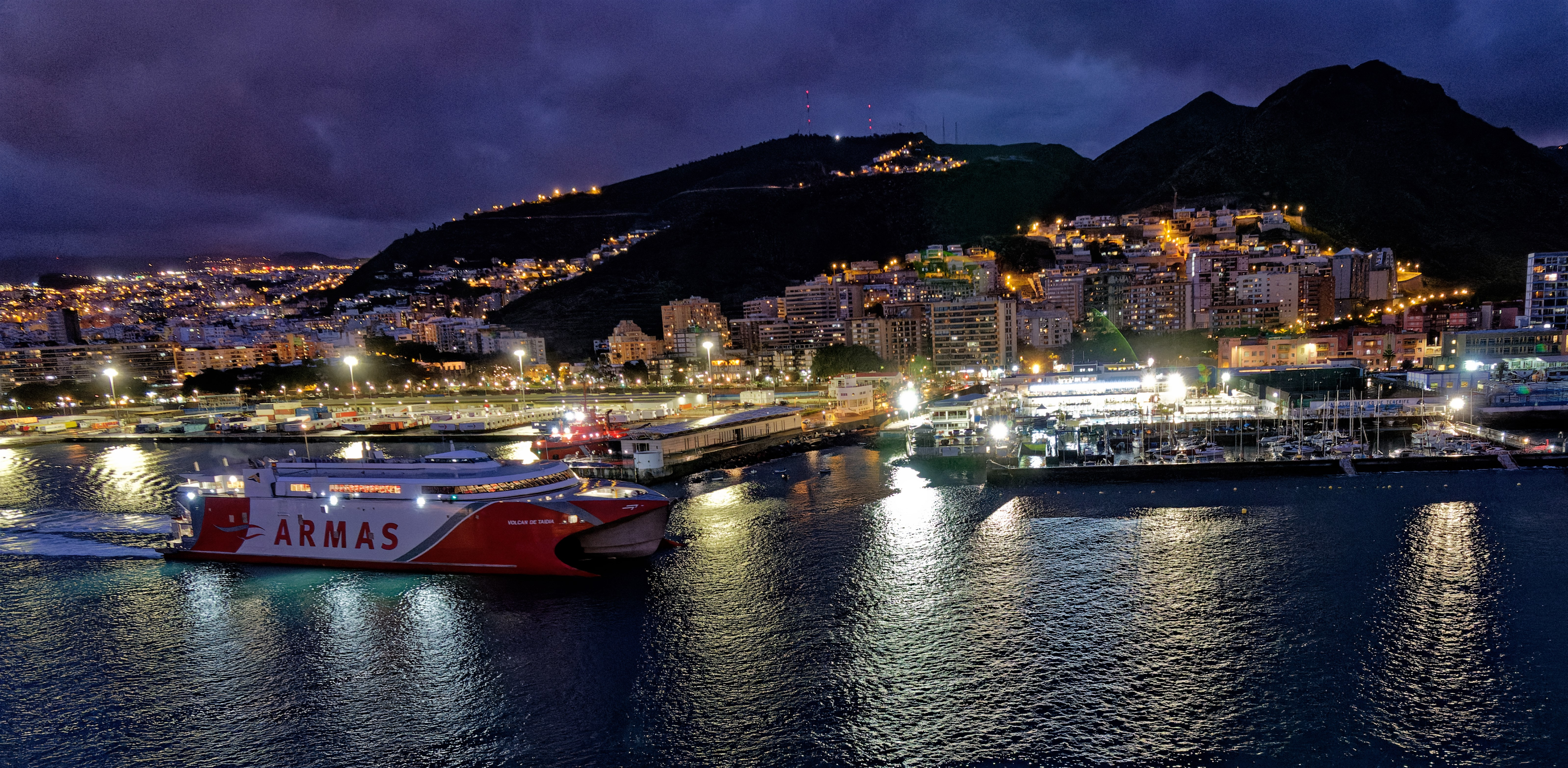
In the evening, the view of Sant Crut is particularly impressive

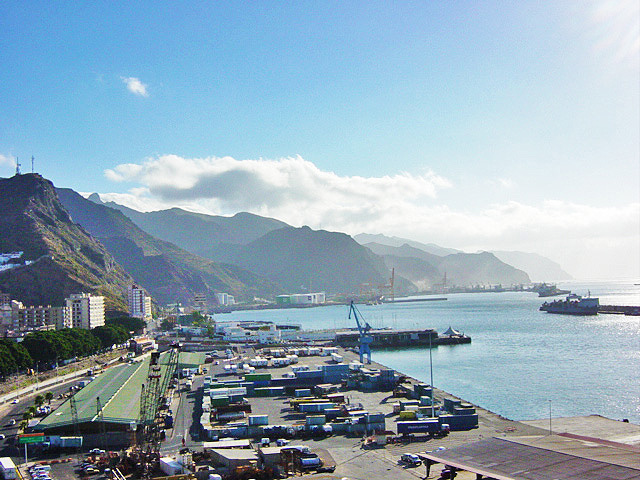
Panoramic view of the Port of Santa Cruz de Tenerife

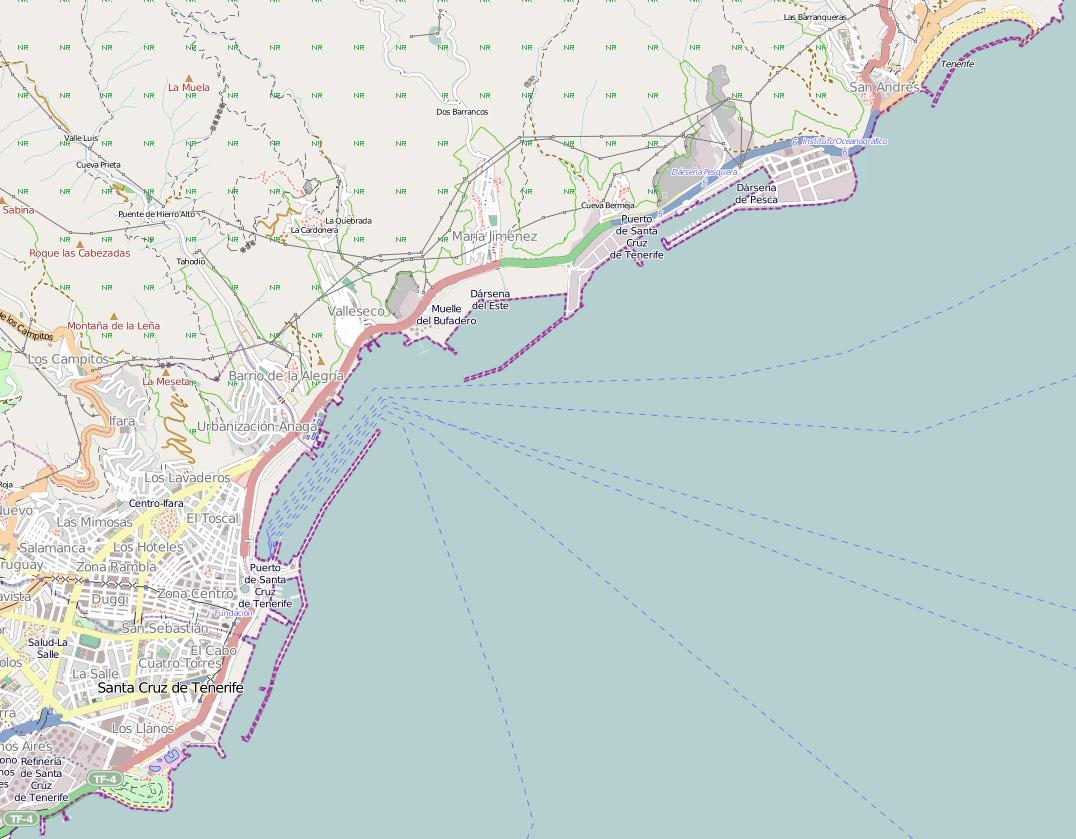
Port of Santa Cruz de Tenerife

The Port of Santa Cruz de Tenerife (Spanish: 'Puerto de Santa Cruz de Tenerife') in Santa Cruz de Tenerife, is used by fishing boats, commercial and passenger ships, and sports. Located on the Atlantic Ocean, it is managed by the Port Authority of Santa Cruz de Tenerife, who also manage all commercial and leisure ports of the Province of Santa Cruz de Tenerife (El Hierro, La Gomera, La Palma and Tenerife islands). Next to this port is the famous building of the Auditorio de Tenerife.

The Port of Santa Cruz de Tenerife is the most important of the Canary Islands ports in terms of passengers, as 23% of passenger transport by sea of the islands is through this port. Apart from hosting interisland ferry connections, the Port of Santa Cruz de Tenerife is a staging post of numerous shipping lines, linking it with the main ports in Europe, Africa and America. The Port of Santa Cruz de Tenerife stretches from the fishing dock of San Andrés until muelle de Hondura, with an area of about twelve kilometers, this makes the port more extension of the Canary Islands. In 2016, the Port of Santa Cruz de Tenerife was included among the three major ports in the world for cruise traffic by Seatrade Cruise Med. It shares this consideration with the Port of Southampton (UK) and the cruise terminal Kai Tak, the Port of Hong Kong (China). For its part, in 2023 a report prepared by the World Bank and S&P Global ranked the Port of Santa Cruz de Tenerife as the third most efficient in Spain (after Algeciras and Barcelona) and ninth in Europe.

== Characteristics ==
Under Spanish maritime regulation, several ports are bundled together on technical, political and historical reasons under the structure of Autoridad Portuaria (Port Authority), and full statistics sometimes only refer to Port Authorities, rather than individual ports. However, a brief description of the strengths and weaknesses of the Port of Santa Cruz de Tenerife is included here, based on statistical data published by the Port's Authority:

- It has a significant relevance in two categories: Cruise Passengers (#1 of the Canary Islands, 607.000 cruise passengers in 2011, second of Spain, only surpassed by the Port of Barcelona) and in Fresh Fish caughts (ranking No. 1 in the Canary Islands, although quantitively the latter represents a minor category, only 5.400 Tonnes in 2011).
- Due to the importance of interinsular maritime transport, it also holds a dominant position in Passenger Transport (1.750.000 in 2011), followed by the Port of Los Cristianos, located in the south of Tenerife and main maritime gateway to the Western Canaries.
- Although self-proclaimed as a relevant hub in the Europe-Africa-America maritime freight traffic, transhipment remains as the main weakness of the Port of Santa Cruz de Tenerife. According to recent figures, the Port handled in 2011 a total amount of 330.000 TEUS, being the transit a mere testimonial share of it (0,011% of total cargo). Therefore, the Port has been downgraded (when compared to the nearby Port of Las Palmas, in the island of Gran Canaria, and excluded from the TEN-T Trans-European Transport Network (selected by the European Commission-based ob quantitative criteria, e.g. handling >1% of total European maritime cargo). However, new developments are expected, following the expansion project of the Dársena del Este and the concession for container handling operations extended to OHL.
- The Port of Santa Cruz de Tenerife has the most modern cruise terminal in the region of Macaronesia. It has an area of 9,000 square meters and capacity to serve up to 10,000 cruise passengers. The building integrates several functions including: checking, control, waiting for passengers and luggage and local distribution. It also has parking areas for buses and taxis, and areas of logistics and procurement. It has 50 seats billing; waiting area with 520 seats; cafeteria and phone and internet area, and a VIP room; security agencies; policing; officiates dockers; office for conducting tours of the island of Tenerife; toilets and wardrobe staff.

The port's facilities include a border inspection post (BIP) approved by the European Union, which is responsible for inspecting all types of imports from third countries or exports to countries outside the European Economic Area.

Some of the world's largest ocean liners like the Queen Mary 2 (2004) and Queen Elizabeth 2 (also 2004) have stopped in the Port. The proximity of two international airports backs up its position as a base for cruises.

On September 26, 1993 Michael Jackson's Dangerous World Tour stopped in the port of Santa Cruz in front of 45.000 people.

== Sisters ports ==
- Port of Shenzhen, China.
