= 1977 Krugersdorp bank robbery =

Bank robbery in South Africa

In the last week of April of 1977 (30 April – 1 May) a burglary took place at the Standard Bank in Krugersdorp, South Africa. The criminals gained access to the bank vault by digging a tunnel underneath the building. Over R 400,000 (equivalent to over R 19.5 million in 2018) was stolen in the robbery. To this day, the case remains unsolved and no arrests were made.

== Modus operandi ==
The empty shop from which the tunnel started was rented by Mr Nightingale. Nightingale’s reason for renting the shop was to utilise it as a photo studio. Investigation afterwards showed that it was a false name, and so was the residential address provided to the owner of the shop. The address was an address in Linden, Johannesburg but the person staying there was cleared by the police as not involved. The windows of the shop were covered with newspaper.

== The robbery ==
Then a tunnel was dug in the floor of the shop of 35 metres (115 ft) long and which passed four shops to reach the bank. The soil taken from the tunnel was emptied into 20 kg (44 lb) bags and stored in bags in a walk in strongroom at the rear of the premises. Work was done on the tunnel at night and the windows of the shop were covered with brown paper as most people would do when fitting out a new business and thus caused no suspicion. The shaft was cleverly hidden by a trap door in the floor.

The perpetrators had installed wooden poles to stabilise the tunnel and prevent it from collapsing. It took 3 months to complete. Once inside the bank, the robbers broke a hole in the brick wall and opened the safe using an oxyacetylene torch. During the investigation, evidence was found to suggest that food was prepared inside the safe. The bank had turned off its trembler alarm systems due to compressors that were being used by a nearby building site. The robbery was only discovered the following Monday once the bank opened.

== Stolen goods ==
The robbers took cash, travellers’ cheques and jewellery in safety deposit boxes. The Saturday Star newspaper, in a 2013 retrospective article, stated that it was believed that the robbery actually netted approximately R 1 million (equivalent to R 49 million in 2018).

== Investigations afterwards ==
Brigadier JF Roos from Pretoria was in charge of the investigation. Identikits of the robbers were drawn up by witnesses who said they saw the men on the weekend wearing blue overalls.

== Outcome ==
No verifiable leads were ever produced, no arrests were made, and no verifiable conclusion(s) were ever made. It remains unresolved. However new information contained in the book, The Harvest of my Times (2019) has come to light. That in the same week the robbery was widely reported, safes of mint coins were recovered in the village of Ga-Monare, just over hundred kilometres from Grobler’s Bridge border post with Botswana. The money was reported to the principal of a neighbouring school who called in the police. The principal brought his thirteen year old who saw the two safes and how the police recovered the money. The son, who also became a teacher, later wrote a book about the money recovered and linked to the Krugersdorp heist.

== See also ==
- 1971 Baker Street robbery
- 2003 Antwerp diamond heist
- 2005 Schiphol Airport diamond heist
- 2013 Brussels Airport diamond heist
- 2015 Hatton Garden safe deposit burglary
- List of missing treasures
