= Witches of Laspaúles =

16th-century women accused of witchcraft

The Witches of Laspaúles refers to the women who were executed for witchcraft in Laspaúles (Huesca) in the 16th century. They were subjected to torture and burned alive. The witch trial has become famous in the area where a park, Brujas de Laspaúles, and a museum devoted to the witch hunt have been established.

== History ==
This episode of Huescan history came to light in 1981, when the local parish priest, Domingo Subías, discovered between 1,000 and 1,200 manuscripts hidden in the church's bell tower. The texts were sent to the Heidelberg University for analysis and to verify their authenticity. The manuscripts describe how women were accused of poisoning neighbors, abducting and killing children for ritual purposes, producing prohibited ointments, and digging up cadavers to obtain ingredients for their poisons. Furthermore, a document dated February 19, 1953 explains how the executions and four days of hangings were carried out, as described by researcher Carlos Garcés in The Bad Seed (La mala semilla).

According to Garcés account on the television program Cuarto Milenio, there existed, "the belief that the witches were a sect of devotees of the devil and that they were fundamentally dedicated to causing evil. In some of these trials, these women were accused of gathering with the devil by night, which took on a distinctive form throughout these proceedings. Garcés' work maintains that the regions that took to witch hunting with greater intensity were Aragon and Catalonia, rather than Basque Country or Navarre. The protagonists of Garcés' work were, for the most part, folk healers or curanderos, who were blamed for any misfortunes, like a bad harvest or an unexpected death. According to this researcher, in Huesca alone, some 120 women were hung or burned at the stake between 1461 and 1645.

== Torture and Execution ==
Before their sentences were carried out, the women were tortured with the aim of extracting a confession. The usual method of torture that was documented in these trials consisted of tying the women's hands behind their back and hanging them from a cord that was fastened to a pulley on a roof. In some cases, there was also a rock attached to intensify the pain. The first documented execution took place on March 4, 1592. The hangings were carried out in Rodero de San Roc, a knoll near Laspaúles from which the neighbors could observe the massacre from their own village.

== See also ==
- Basque witch trials
- Witches of Anaga
