= Royal Danish (Fabergé egg) =

1903 Imperial Faberge egg

Royal Danish Fabergé egg
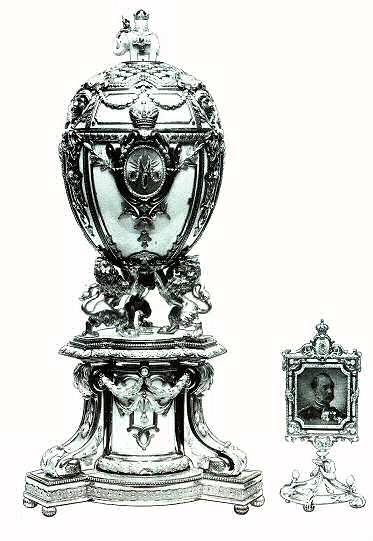
- The Royal Danish egg and surprise.
- Year delivered: 1903
- Customer: Nicholas II
- Recipient: Maria Feodorovna

Current owner
- Individual or institution: lost

Design and materials
- Workmaster: Michael Perkhin
- Materials used: gold, vitreous enamel, diamonds
- Surprise: miniature portraits of Christian IX of Denmark and Louise of Hesse-Kassel

The Royal Danish egg (also known as the Danish Jubilee egg) is a jewelled enameled Easter egg made under the supervision of the Russian jeweller Peter Carl Fabergé in 1903, for Nicholas II of Russia, who presented the egg to his mother, the Dowager Empress Maria Feodorovna. One of six Fabergé eggs that are currently lost, it is one of two eggs whose existence is known only from a single photograph, the other being 1909's Alexander III Commemorative egg. A partially obscured photograph of the lost 1888 egg Cherub with Chariot may also exist.

== Surprise ==
The egg contains miniature portraits of Christian IX of Denmark and his wife, Louise of Hesse-Kassel (or Hesse-Cassel), the parents of the Dowager Empress Maria Feodorovna.

== History ==
The egg is known from a description published in The Connoisseur magazine in June, 1934:

"Miniatures of the late King of Denmark and his Queen are framed as the surprise feature in the Imperial egg. The outer surface is in light blue and white enamel with ornaments in gold and precious stones. On the top are the armorial bearings of the Danish Royal Family, and it is supported by Danish heraldic lions."

One of the largest Fabergé eggs at over 22,9 cm (9 inches) in height, the egg is crowned by the symbol of Denmark's ancient Order of the Elephant.

In 1903 the Dowager Empress Maria Feodorovna, born in Denmark as Princess Dagmar, returned to Denmark for the 40th Anniversary of her father's accession to the throne. The Royal Danish egg was thus a commemoration of this event and at the same time to commemorate the death of Queen Louise. Nicholas II wrote to his mother in Copenhagen that he was "sending you a Fabergé Easter present. I hope it will arrive safely; it simply opens from the top".

== See also ==
- Egg decorating
- List of missing treasure

== Sources ==
- Faber, Toby (2008). Faberge's Eggs: The Extraordinary Story of the Masterpieces That Outlived an Empire. Random House. ISBN 978-1-4000-6550-9.
- Forbes, Christopher; Prinz von Hohenzollern, Johann Georg (1990). FABERGE; The Imperial Eggs. Prestel. ASIN B000YA9GOM.
- Lowes, Will (2001). Fabergé Eggs: A Retrospective Encyclopedia. Scarecrow Press. ISBN 0-8108-3946-6.
- Snowman, A Kenneth (1988). Carl Faberge: Goldsmith to the Imperial Court of Russia. Gramercy. ISBN 0-517-40502-4.
