= List of missing treasures =

List of notable treasures that are currently lost or missing

This is an incomplete list of notable treasures that are currently lost or missing. The existence of some of these treasures is mythical or disputed.

== List ==
Name	Existence	Original Location	Year lost	Image	Description
Ark of the Covenant	Legend	Ancient Israel and Judah	586 BC	Replica of the Ark of the Covenant in George Washington Masonic National Memorial	The Ark of the Covenant is an artifact which is believed to hold the Ten Commandments. The Ark of Covenant was held in Jerusalem in Ancient Israel and Judah until 586 BC but it was taken out and hidden following the Siege of Jerusalem and was never recovered.
Gold of Tolosa	Legend	Volcae	106 BC		A treasure hoard seized by the ancient Roman proconsul Quintus Servilius Caepio from the Volcae town of Tolosa, modern-day Toulouse.
Menorah from the Second Temple	Confirmed	Ancient Israel and Judah	191	Menorah from the Temple in Jerusalem depicted on a frieze on the Arch of Titus in Rome	The Menorah from the Second Temple in Jerusalem in Ancient Israel and Judah was looted by the Romans in 70 AD and put on view in the Temple of Peace in Rome. The temple burned down in 191 after which the fate of the Menorah is uncertain. If it survived the fire, it could have been brought to Carthage by the Vandals after their Sack of Rome in 455, as mentioned by Procopius in the 6th century.
Alaric's Treasure	Legend	Western Roman Empire	410	—	After sacking Rome in 410, the Visigoths fled to southern Italy, in Calabria. There their king, Alaric suddenly died from illness and was buried with his treasure in an unknown river, often reported to be the Busento.
Ganj-e Badavard	Legend	Ancient Iran	circa 7th–10th c.	—	One of the eight treasures of the Sasanian king Khosrow II.
Heirloom Seal of the Realm	Confirmed	Imperial China	circa 960	—	Imperial Seal of China created by Emperor Qin Shi Huang, lost after the Five Dynasties and Ten Kingdoms period in the 10th century.
Egill Skallagrímsson's silver	Legend	Iceland	circa 990-995	—	A large quantity of silver coinage, allegedly buried near Mosfellsbær, Iceland, when Egill was in his eighties.
Kusanagi	Legend	Nagoya	1185	Artist's impressions of the Imperial Regalia of Japan	A sword and one of the Three Sacred Treasures of Japan that legitimize the rule of the Emperor. Lost at sea in the Battle of Dan-no-ura in the Genpei War. Current government claims possession, but has not permitted outside verification.
Lost Crown Jewels of England	Legend	Kingdom of England	1216	—	Baggage train of King John ("John Lackland"), lost in The Wash near Sutton Bridge during the First Barons' War.
Llywelyn's coronet	Legend		1303	—	The coronet of Llywelyn ap Gruffudd, the last sovereign Prince of Wales, was seized along with other holy artifacts at the end of the Conquest of Wales by Edward I, in 1284 taken to London, and kept with the crown jewels in Westminster Abbey until they were stolen in 1303. It was not present in the inventory taken during the destruction of the crown jewels by Oliver Cromwell in 1649, and remains unaccounted for.
Library of Ivan the Terrible	Legend	the Kremlin	1518	—	"Golden Library" thought to contain rare Greek, Latin, and Egyptian works from the libraries of Constantinople and Alexandria, as well as 2nd-century CE Chinese texts and manuscripts from Ivan IV's own era.
La Noche Triste treasure	Partially Confirmed	Aztec Empire	1520	—	Large amount of gold looted from the palace of Moctezuma II. Occurred during the Spanish conquest of the Aztec Empire.
Lost Inca gold	Partially Confirmed	Inca Empire	circa 1533	—	Originally intended as part of the ransom of Inca Emperor Atahualpa it would have been hidden once it became known that Francisco Pizarro's men had killed him.
Great Bell of Dhammazedi	Confirmed	Hanthawaddy kingdom	1608	—	Cast in 1484 by order of King Dhammazedi of Hanthawaddy Pegu in modern day Myanmar, it is believed to be the largest bell ever cast. It hung in the Shwedagon Pagoda until 1608, when it was removed by Portuguese mercenary, and governor of Syriam (now Thanlyin) Philipe de Brito to be melted into cannons. It was rolled downhill to the Pazundaung Creek, loaded onto a raft, and hauled by elephants to the confluence of the Bago River and the Yangon River, where it was fastened to de Brito's flagship. It sank on its way across the river to Syriam, dragging de Brito's ship with it. Shifting river currents, several shipwrecks, and poor visibility in the muddy river has made locating the bell difficult, and it remains lost, despite several searches in modern times.
The Three Brothers	Confirmed	Burgundian State	1645	1505 painting of the jewel	A piece of jewellery created in 1389, made of three red spinels in a distinctive triangular arrangement around a central diamond. Owned by key historical figures such as Duke John the Fearless of Burgundy, the German banker Jakob Fugger, and English monarchs Elizabeth I, James VI and I, and Charles I. Part of the English Crown Jewels from 1551 to 1644, when it was possibly sold by the wife of Charles I. It vanished from records after 1645.
Treasure of Amaro Pargo	Likely	San Cristóbal de La Laguna	1678–1747	Portrait of Amaro Pargo located on the canvas of the "Christ of Humility and Patience" of the Hermitage of Our Lady of El Rosario in Machado (Tenerife).	The treasure would be composed of "carved silver, gold jewellery, pearls and stones of value, Chinese porcelain, rich fabrics, paintings and perhaps 500,000 pesos". The stories about this treasure are varied, some place it in the environment of the Roques de Anaga, while others place it in the zone of Punta del Hidalgo and the cave of San Mateo, northeast of Tenerife in the Canary Islands.
Loch Arkaig treasure	Legend	Lochaber	1745		The treasure of Loch Arkaig, sometimes known as the Jacobite gold, was a large amount of specie provided by Spain to finance the Jacobite rising in Scotland in 1745, and rumoured still to be hidden at Loch Arkaig in Lochaber.
Sceptre of Dagobert	Confirmed	Basilica of Saint-Denis	1795	Sceptre of Dagobert.	Originally part of the French Regalia, sometimes considered its oldest part, dating from the 7th century, it was stored in the treasure of the Basilica of Saint-Denis (also known as Basilique royale de Saint-Denis) until 1795, when it disappeared, probably stolen.
Oak Island money pit	Legend	Nova Scotia	1795	—	A possible treasure trove located in a large hole on an island off the coast of Nova Scotia, Canada.
Treasure of the Esperanza	Legend	Viceroyalty of Peru	1816	—	1.5 million gold pesos and an equal value in silver precolumbian art looted from the Viceroyalty of Peru, shipped on the Esperanza, taken and buried by pirates shipwrecked on Palmyra Atoll.
Treasure of Lima	Likely	Lima	1820	—	Gold, silver and jewellery stolen from the Spanish in 1820. The treasure is thought to be buried on Cocos Island in Costa Rica and it is estimated to be worth £160 million.
Confederate gold	Legend	Columbus, Georgia	circa 1865	—	Gold from the Confederacy. Lost after the American Civil War.
Twin Sisters	Confirmed	Republic of Texas	1865	Replicas featured at San Jacinto Monument	A pair of cannons used by Texas Military Forces during the Texas Revolution and American Civil War. Considered the "Texas Holy Grail."
Tokugawa's buried treasure	Legend	Edo	circa 1868	—	A legendary treasure allegedly buried in Mount Akagi by the Tokugawa shogunate (disputed).
Kruger Millions	Legend	Machadodorp	1902	—	Millions of gold pounds presumed to have been produced by the Boer forces in the South African veld under order of President Paul Kruger. The money was believed to fund the purchase of weapons for the Boer Commandos. The funds went missing. Believed to have been buried or hidden somewhere in South Africa or taken by Kruger to Switzerland.
Crown Jewels of Ireland	Confirmed	Dublin	1907	The Crown Jewels	Heavily bejeweled insignia of the Most Illustrious Order of St Patrick. Stolen from Dublin Castle in 1907.
The Tsar's Treasure (RMS Republic)	Partially Confirmed	Belfast	1909	—	$3 million in newly minted American double eagle coins sent to the Russian Baltic Fleet, an $800,000 US Government shipment in mixed coin to the American Atlantic Fleet, and the confirmed loss of $500,000 in passenger effects (all 1909 values) were lost when the RMS Republic foundered off the coast of New England as a result of a collision.
The gold of the RMS Republic	Confirmed	Belfast	1909	The Republic sinking by the stern after the collision in 1909	The RMS Republic was a British ship built in 1903, the Republic was carrying $3,250,000 worth of gold and double eagles for the US Navy's Great White Fleet. However, the ship collided with the SS Florida and sunk. In 1919 an attempt was made to recover the lost money, but it was ultimately unsuccessful.
Romanian Treasure	Confirmed	Moscow	1917	—	The gold reserves (approx. 120 tonnes) of the Romanian government and other valuables sent to Russia for safekeeping during World War I. These were mislaid after the October Revolution and only some of the objects, and none of the gold reserves, have been returned as of 2012.
Lost Imperial Fabergé eggs	Confirmed	Saint Petersburg	1922 or later	The Alexander III Commemorative egg	Seven eggs in the Imperial series are missing: 1886 – The Hen with Sapphire Pendant egg (last seen 1922); 1888 – The Cherub with Chariot egg (last seen 1922, may have been exhibited in New York City in 1934); 1889 – The Nécessaire egg (sold by Wartski in 1952, has not been seen since); 1897 – The Mauve egg (photo frame 'surprise' still extant); 1902 – The Empire Nephrite Egg (the provenance of the "found" Nephrite egg is contested); 1903 – The Royal Danish egg; 1909 – The Alexander III Commemorative egg
The Just Judges	Confirmed		1934	Replica	Lower left panel of the Adoration of the Mystic Lamb, which was displayed at the Saint Bavo Cathedral in Ghent, Belgium, was stolen on the night of 10 April 1934.
Dutch Schultz's treasure	Legend		1935		Fearing imminent incarceration, notorious Depression-era gangster Dutch Schultz was said to have buried $7 million in cash and bonds somewhere in the Catskill Mountains of upstate New York. He was gunned down shortly thereafter together with his associates, and as they did not disclose the location of the stash to anyone, the burial spot remains unknown. Treasure hunters still dig around for the loot to this day, although its existence has never been confirmed outside of gang lore.
Royal Casket	Confirmed		1939	The Royal Casket	Memorial containing 73 precious relics that had once belonged to Polish royalty. Looted by the Wehrmacht during the German invasion of Poland at the beginning of World War II.
Sword of Islam	Confirmed		1943		Ceremonial sword presented to Benito Mussolini in 1937 from Berber collaborators in Italian Libya. Disappeared in July 1943, after his summer residence was destroyed by the Italian Resistance.
Peking Man	Confirmed		1941–1945	Replica	Fossil remains of Homo erectus pekinensis; dated ~500,000 years old. Lost during World War II in China in 1941 when the U.S. Marine Corps moved them out of Japanese-occupied Beijing or may have been on Japanese ship Awa Maru when it was torpedoed by the USS Queenfish and sank in April 1945.
Amber Room	Confirmed		circa 1945	Reconstruction	Removed from Catherine Palace, Saint Petersburg, by Army Group North during the German invasion of the Soviet Union and transported to Königsberg, Germany. Estimated (adjusted) value: $142 million. Reconstructed in 2003.
Yamashita's gold	Legend		circa 1945	A Buddha statue, supposedly a replica of a solid gold statue that was a part of Yamashita's treasure.	War loot stolen by the Imperial Japanese Army from Southeast Asia and hidden in the Philippines. Alleged. Named for General Tomoyuki Yamashita.
Awa Maru treasure	Legend		1945	—	Gold, platinum, and diamonds worth more than $5 billion. Lost when the Japanese ship Awa Maru was torpedoed by the USS Queenfish and sank in April 1945.
Nazi gold train	Legend		1945	—	A train laden with gold and other treasures hidden by the Nazi Germans in a tunnel near Wałbrzych in Lower Silesia, Poland.
Honjō Masamune	Confirmed		1945	1928 drawing of the Honjō Masamune	The Honjō Masamune, a legendary samurai sword, created by the master swordmaker Gorō Masamune between 1288 and 1328 AD. The sword was passed down over the centuries from Shōgun to Shōgun, and is considered a priceless Japanese cultural artifact. Lost during the U.S. occupation of Japan.
Patiala Necklace	Confirmed		circa 1948	The Patiala Necklace	Made by the House of Cartier in 1928 for Bhupinder Singh of Patiala, then Maharaja of Patiala. A necklace containing 2,930 diamonds including the world's seventh largest diamond, the 428 carat "De Beers", the Patiala Necklace vanished from the Royal Treasury of Patiala around 1948. Some diamonds were later recovered.
Nelson's Chelengk	Confirmed		1951	Nelson with the Chelengk in his hat	A medal made of diamonds given to Admiral Horatio Nelson by the Ottoman Empire for his naval service in the Battle of the Nile. Placed in the National Maritime Museum in London in 1929 and stolen in 1951.
Tucker's Cross	Confirmed		1975	—	Emerald-studded gold cross, discovered in a shipwreck in 1955 and stolen from a museum in Bermuda sometime prior to 1975, when it was discovered to have been replaced with a fake.
Lufthansa heist	Confirmed		1978	—	Cash and jewels from a robbery at Lufthansa's cargo terminal at John F. Kennedy International Airport in December 1978. With a value of about $5 million, it was the largest cash robbery in the United States at the time.
Brink's-Mat robbery	Confirmed		1983	—	Gold bullion, diamonds, and cash valued at £26 million (worth approximately £79 million in 2015)
Isabella Stewart Gardner Museum heist	Confirmed		1990	—	Thirteen works of art valued at $500 million were stolen from the Isabella Stewart Gardner Museum by two men posing as police officers. The art was mostly stolen from the museum's Dutch Room and included pieces by Rembrandt and Vermeer.
Antwerp Diamond heist	Confirmed		2003	—	Diamonds, gold and other jewels worth $189 million. Dubbed the "heist of the century".
Graff Diamonds robbery	Confirmed		2009	—	43 items of jewellery, stolen in London on 6 August 2009. Valued at nearly £40 million.
Ivory Coast Crown Jewels	Confirmed		2011	—	Around 80 objects were stolen from the Musée des Civilisations de Côte d'Ivoire in Abidjan, including gold pendants, necklaces, masks, sculptures and religious artifacts worth an estimated $6 million.
Brussels Airport diamond heist	Confirmed		2013	—	Diamonds stolen from a Helvetic Airways Fokker 100 at Brussels Airport valued at $50 million.
Bitcoin buried in Newport landfill	Confirmed		2013	—	A laptop hard drive containing the private keys for 7,500–8,000 Bitcoin. James Howells has repeatedly requested that the council allow him to search for his device, buried in Docksway landfill, Newport, Wales, and has been refused by Newport City Council. As of November 2024, the missing Bitcoins were worth $750 million, and Howells sued the council for £495 million.
Hatton Garden safe deposit burglary	Confirmed		2015	—	Safe deposit facility burgled in London, total stolen could have been up to £200 million.
Dresden Green Vault heist	Confirmed		2019	—	Diamond jewellery sets, a sword with a diamond-encrusted handle, several shoe buckles and buttons made of diamonds, and parts of a diamond necklace belonging to Queen Amalie Auguste from 1824. Valued at €113 million. In December 2022 it was announced that a large portion of the stolen items had been recovered. Thirty-one of the items were returned to the museum after being seized by Berlin authorities.
Eight pieces of the French Crown Jewels	Confirmed		2025	Tiara of Maria Amalia of Naples and Sicily	Eight pieces of the French Crown Jewels with a value of €88 million. They were stolen in the 2025 Louvre robbery from the Galerie d'Apollon (lit. 'Apollo's Gallery'), part of the Louvre, Paris, France.

== See also ==
- List of unsolved historical mysteries and proposed explanations
- List of destroyed heritage
- List of lost mines
- Treasure hunting
- Treasure map
- Art theft and looting during World War II
- Looted art
- Lost artworks
- Lost film
- Lost literary work
- Lost television broadcast
- Nazi gold
- Nazi plunder
