= Witches of Anaga =

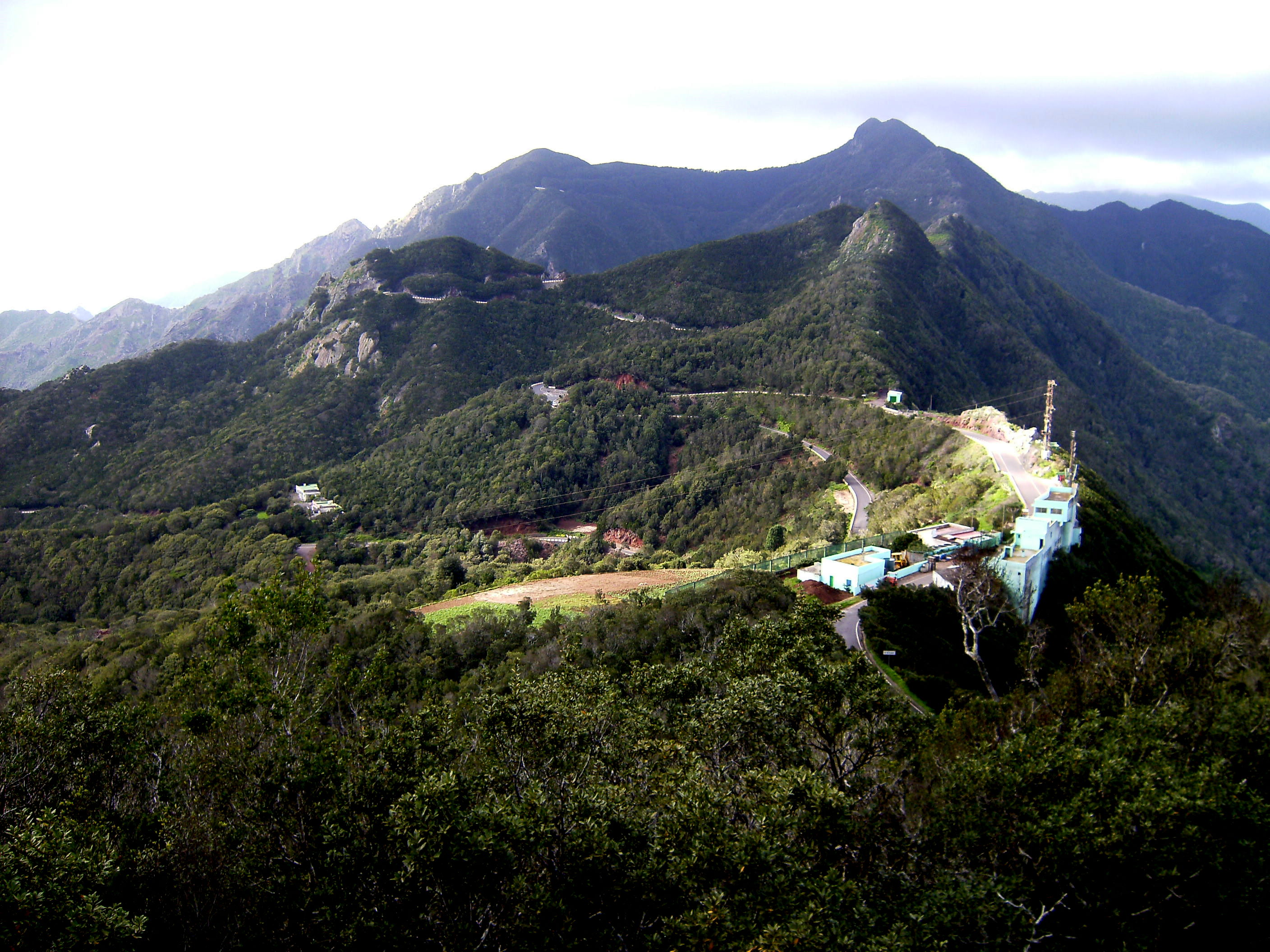
El Bailadero in Anaga. In this place were held covens, according to popular belief.

The Witches of Anaga were (according to popular belief) women who were devoted to covens in the mountainous area of Anaga in the northeast of the island of Tenerife (Canary Islands, Spain).

These rituals were held in an area in the mountains of Anaga in the dorsal between San Andrés and Taganana. The area is called "El Bailadero", which refers to the dances performed by witches around a bonfire. It was believed that after the covens, witches came down to the coast to swim naked. With the passage of time, due to the influence of vampire stories in Eastern Europe, this led to the myth that witches incorporated the aspect of drinking blood, thus making them witch-vampires; typically tales were created that these witches sucked the blood of newborns as they slept in their cribs.

There is also a theory that the origin of this legend was from pagan rituals associated with rituals that celebrated guanches rain; these rituals were considered as an act of witchcraft by the Catholic Church.
