= Brussels Airport diamond heist =

2013 diamond heist

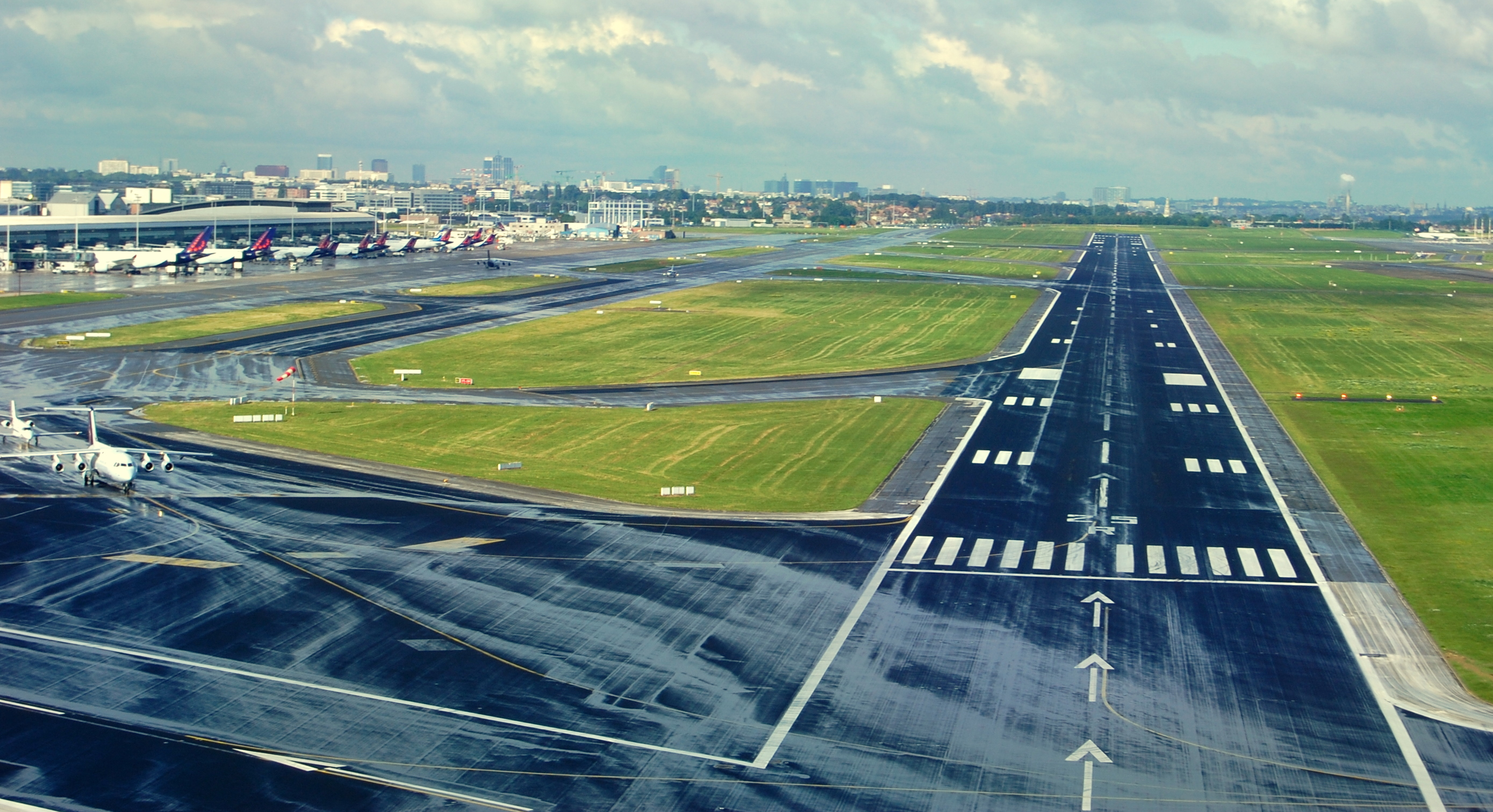
- Brussels Airport runway
- Date: 18 February 2013
- Time: 19:40 CET (estimated)
- Location: Brussels Airport, Belgium; 50°54′5″N 4°29′4″E
- Perpetrator: Eight masked men
- Outcome: Approximately US$50,000,000 in gems stolen

On 18 February 2013, eight masked gunmen in two cars with police markings stole approximately €38,000,000 (US$50,000,000, £33,000,000) worth of diamonds from a Swiss-bound Fokker 100 operated by Helvetic Airways on the apron at Brussels Airport, Belgium, just before 20:00 CET. No shots were fired during the heist.

== Robbery ==
The robbers hid in a construction site outside the airport prior to the robbery. They were armed with Kalashnikov-type assault rifles and dressed as police officers. Entering the airport through a hole they created in the airport security fence, the robbers drove on the property with two vehicles, a Mercedes van and an Audi, both of which were black with flashing blue police lights. They drove straight to the airplane where the gems were being transferred from a Brink's armored van, which had driven from Antwerp, onto the Fokker 100 twin engine jet Swiss Flight LX789, which was bound for Zurich.

The time between the loading procedure and the moment the plane started to move to take off would only have lasted 15 minutes, according to Caroline De Wolf, a spokeswoman for the Antwerp World Diamond Centre. De Wolf stated that the window for opportunity was so small that the perpetrators must have known ahead of time about the transfer procedures and timing.

The robbers stopped the plane, then brandished their guns, stopping the pilots and transport security. The Brussels prosecutor's office described the weapons used as "like Kalashnikovs", most likely the Galil. The robbers never dropped their weapons. The robbers loaded 130 bags into their cars and drove off, but left behind some gems in their hurry.

The whole robbery took about 3 minutes. The robbery did not appear to disturb any of the passengers, who did not know that anything had happened until they were told to disembark because the flight had been cancelled. The van believed to be used in the robbery was later found abandoned and burned.

In May 2013, 31 people were arrested in connection with the theft, and some of the diamonds were recovered. Charges were brought against 19 of those (16 men and 3 women). In contrast to the clockwork execution of the robbery, the arrests came as a result of mistakes made when the suspects tried to sell the stolen goods. Pascal Pont, a Swiss real estate agent, was given a large sack of diamonds from his friend Marc Bertoldi, a luxury car dealer from the French Riviera, whose car was discovered in the vicinity of the robbery. Pont was investigated for his relationship with Bertoldi, and by monitoring his phone calls, police uncovered Pont's unsuccessful attempts to fence the diamonds in Geneva, which is not a city known for its diamond trade.

The trial was scheduled to begin in September 2017, but it was delayed because Bertoldi was serving a sentence in a French prison for kidnapping and could not be extradited. Bertoldi admitted to having received diamonds stolen in the robbery, but denied any involvement.

In May 2018, 18 of those tried in connection to the heist were acquitted. The case against Bertoldi, the suspected mastermind, was yet to be heard, pending the outcome of his appeal over his kidnapping conviction.

In June 2019, the correctional tribunal of Brussels sentenced Bertoldi to five years of imprisonment and a fine for being a co-conspirator in the heist, for being part of a criminal organisation and for money laundering. The tribunal did not consider him to be the mastermind behind the heist however, contrary to the prosecutor.

== Reaction ==
Belgian prosecutor Ine Van Wymersch said the robbers "were very, very professional". French airport security consultant Doron Levy said that he was "certain this was an inside job", adding the heist was "incredibly audacious and well organized" and that big jobs like that were often so well organized that the robbers "probably know the employees by name".

== See also ==
- 1977 Krugersdorp bank robbery
- Antwerp diamond heist
- Schiphol Airport diamond heist
- Baker Street robbery
- Hatton Garden safe deposit burglary
- List of missing treasures
- Lufthansa heist
