= Macizo de Anaga =

Mountain range in Tenerife, Canary Islands

Coordinates: 28°31′50″N 16°14′27″W

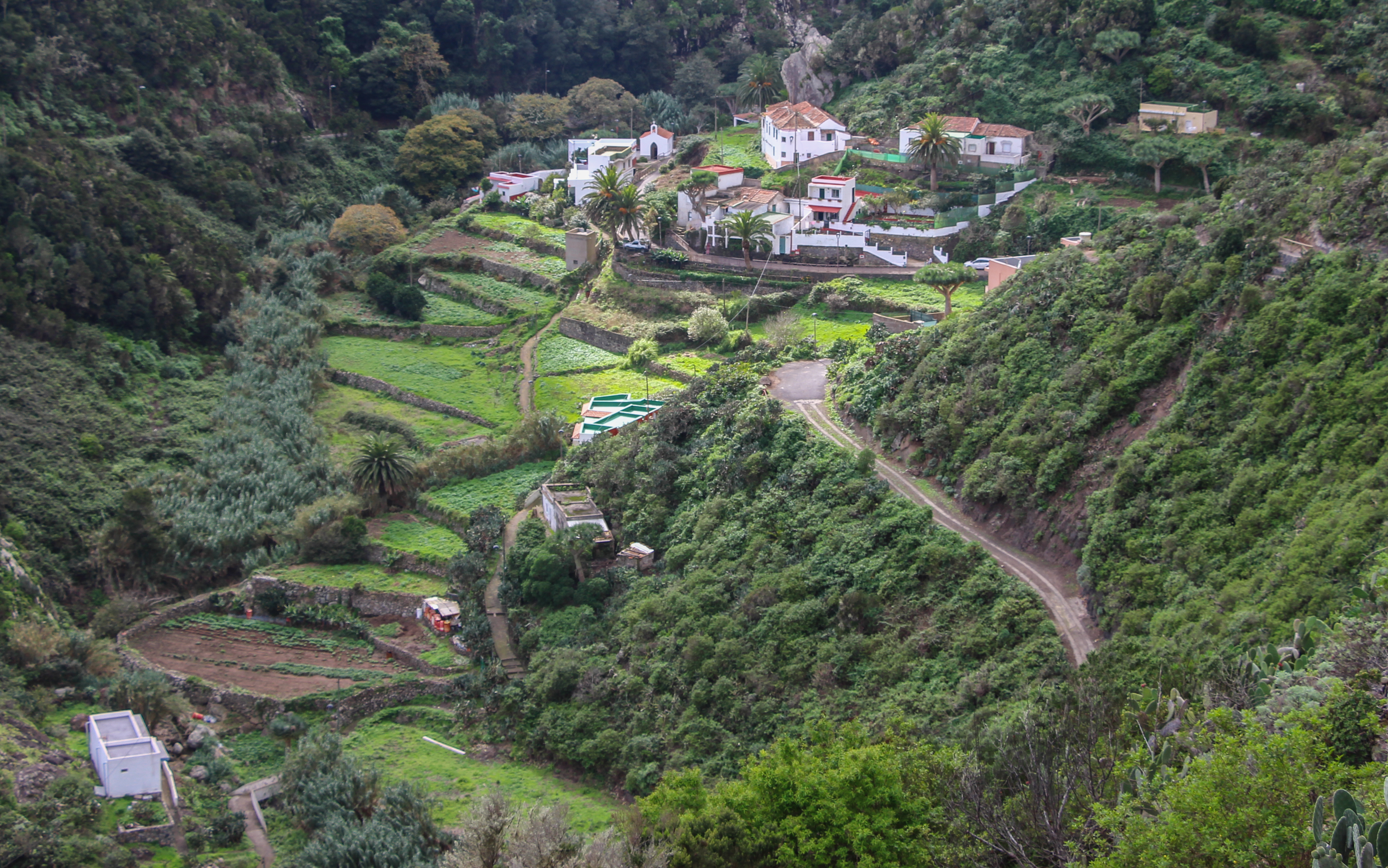
Chamorga, a village in the District of Anaga.

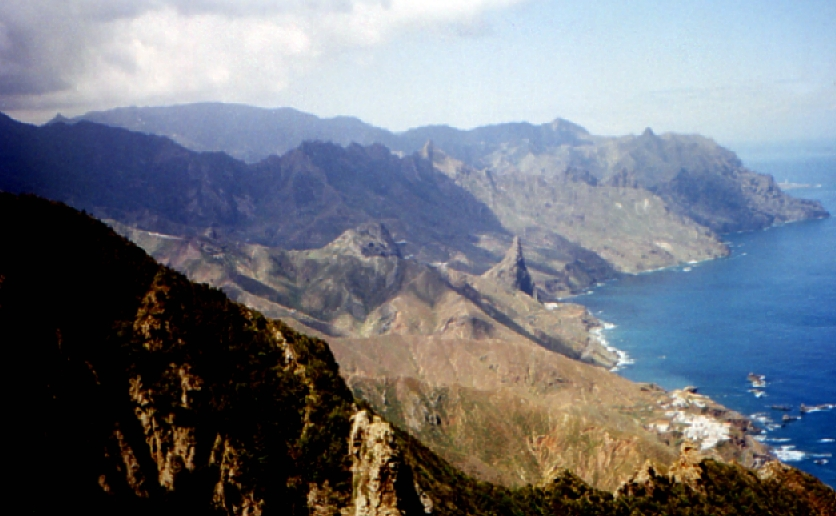
Anaga's mountainous zone is a place of some Canary legends.

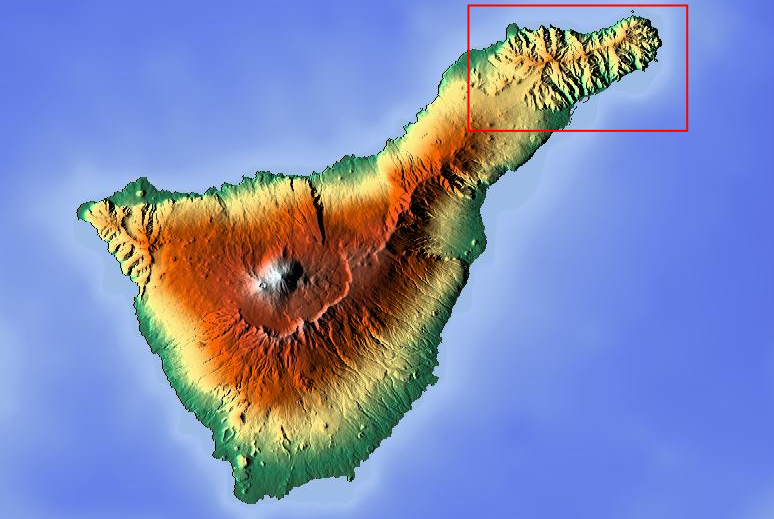
Macizo de Anaga in Tenerife.

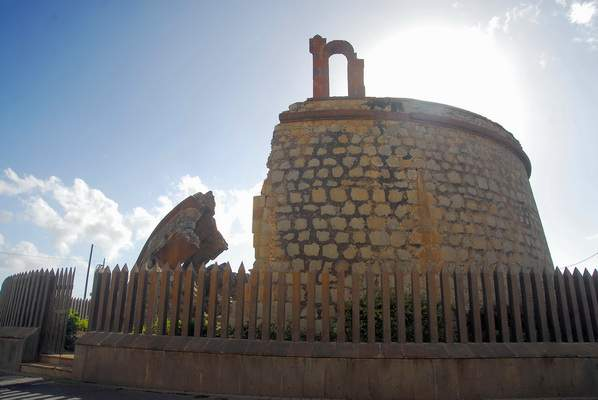
Castle of San Andrés.

Anaga massif (Spanish: Macizo de Anaga) is a mountain range in the northeastern part of the island of Tenerife in the Canary Islands. Formed by volcanic activity approximately 7 to 9 million years ago, it is the oldest part of Tenerife.

The massif is characterized by humid laurisilva forests and a high concentration of endemic species. In 2015 it was designated a UNESCO Biosphere Reserve, and has been described as having the greatest concentration of endemic species in Europe.

Anaga is also an important archaeological landscape containing numerous Guanche burial caves from which human remains, mummies and other archaeological materials have been recovered. Among the best-known discoveries from the region is the Mummy of San Andrés.

Protected as a natural park since 1987 and reclassified as a rural park in 1994, the massif is also associated with local folklore, including traditions surrounding the Witches of Anaga and the legendary Anguila peluda.

== Geology and geography ==
The highest point is 1,024 m (Cruz de Taborno). It stretches from the Punta de Anaga in the northeast to Cruz del Carmen in the southwest. Anaga features the mountain peaks of Bichuelo, Anambro, Chinobre, Pico Limante, Cruz de Taborno and Cruz del Carmen. The mountains were formed by a volcanic eruption about 7 to 9 million years ago making it the oldest part of the island.

== Settlements ==
The main villages in the Macizo de Anaga are San Andrés, Taganana and Igueste de San Andrés.

== Environment, flora and fauna ==
It is a remote and wild area characterized by humid forests, such as laurisilva. Native plant species include Ceropegia dichotoma, Ceropegia fusca and Echium virescens. Since 2015 it is also an UNESCO Biosphere Reserve and is the place that has the largest number of endemic species in Europe.

== Archaeology ==
The Macizo de Anaga is rich in archaeological sites, including Guanche burial caves from which mummies and other archaeological materials have been recovered. Among the discoveries from the region is the Mummy of San Andrés, a Guanche mummy found in a burial cave near the village of San Andrés.

== Folklore ==
A place in the mountains known as El Bailadero is believed to have been a place where witches were practicing witchcraft and dancing around a bonfire.

Anaga also has a cryptozoological legend. It is about the so-called Anguila peluda, which was a monstrous eel of great size that inhabited a puddle at Punta de Anaga and that terrified the local people.

== Protected status ==
Since 1987 it has been protected as a "natural park", reclassified as "rural park" in 1994.

== Gallery ==
The Anaga Mountains

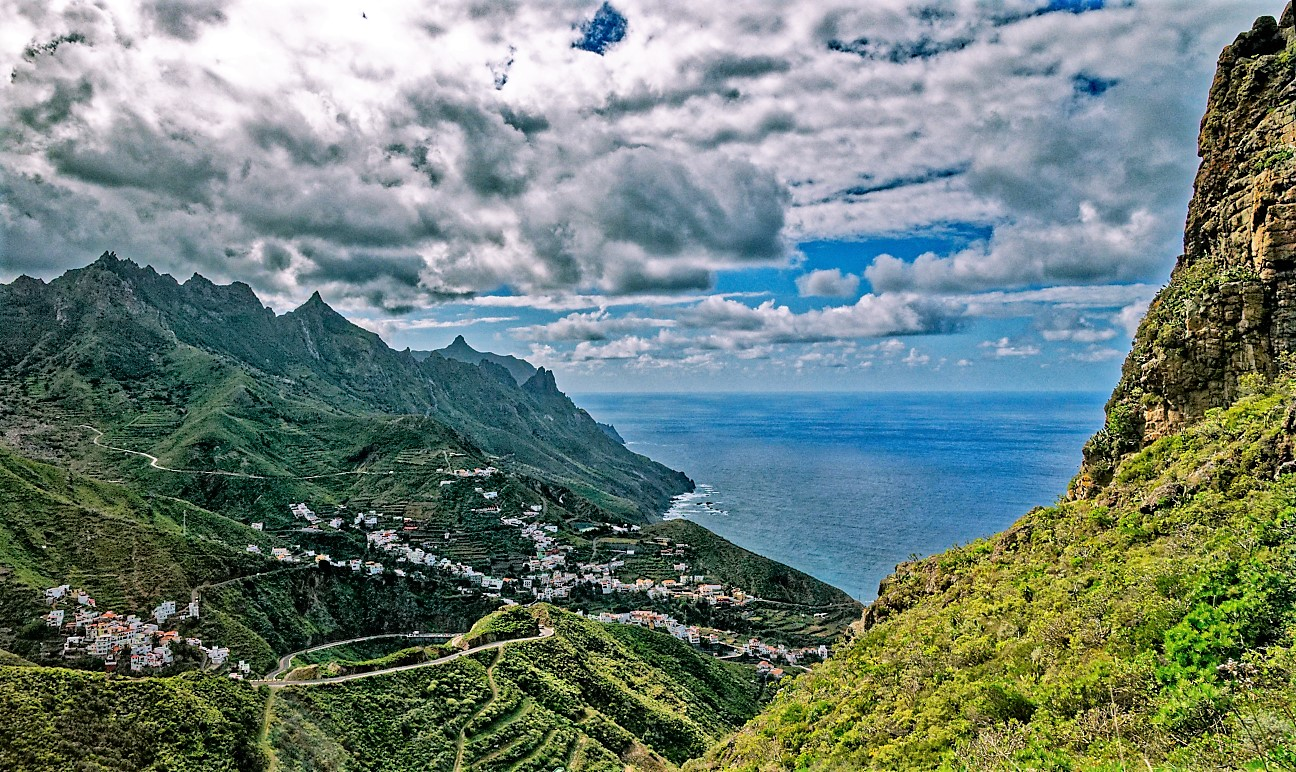

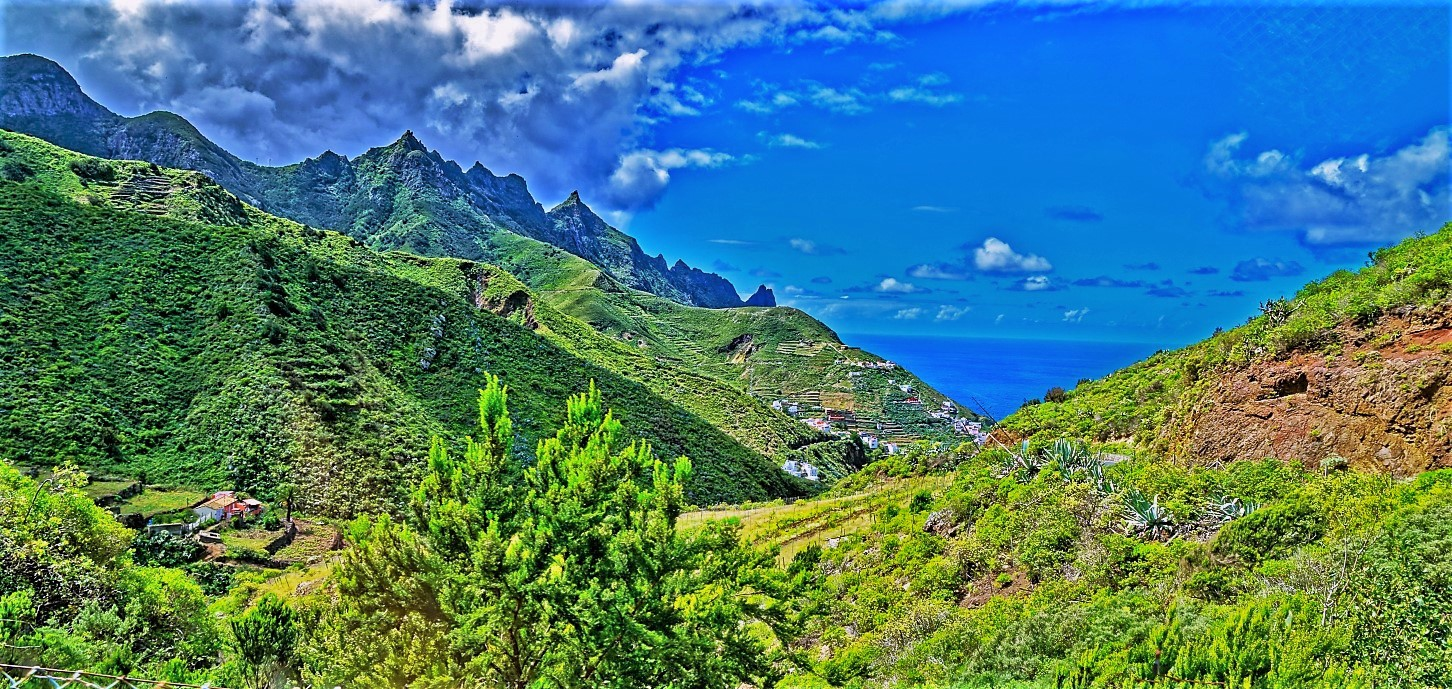

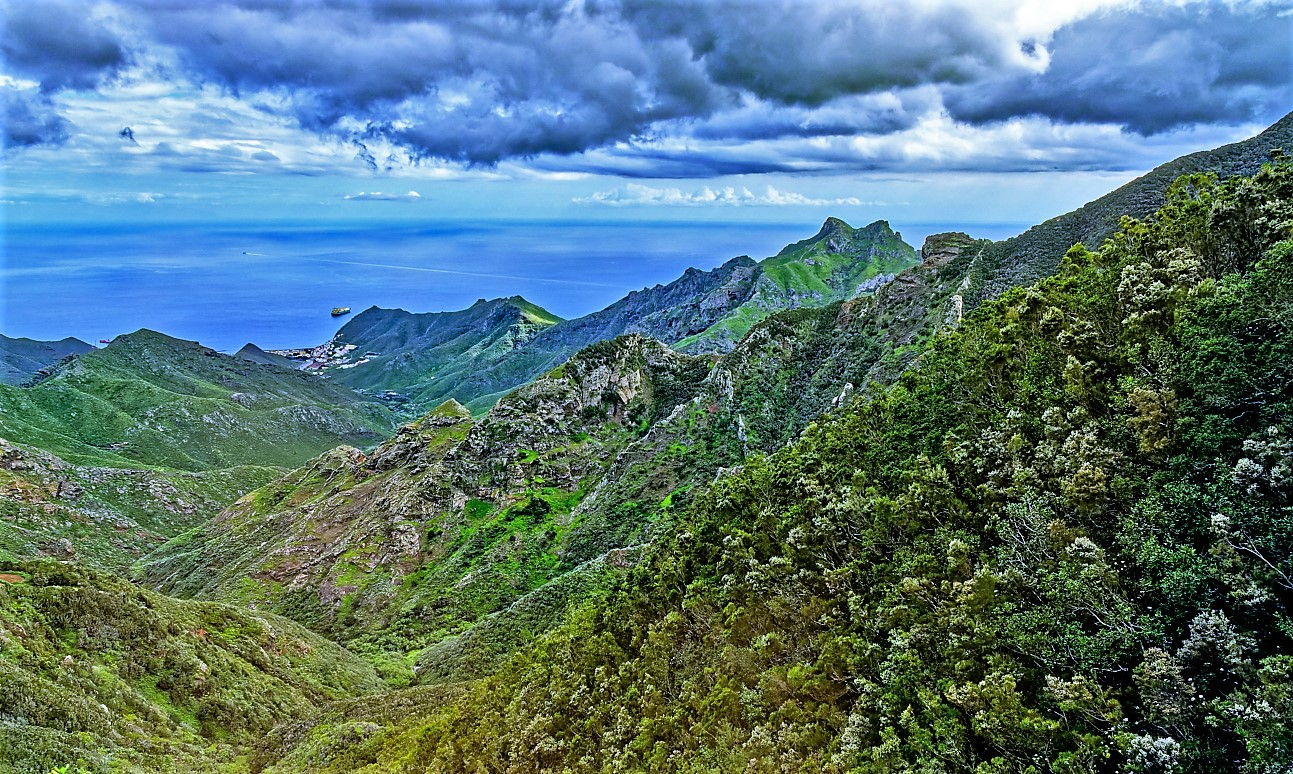

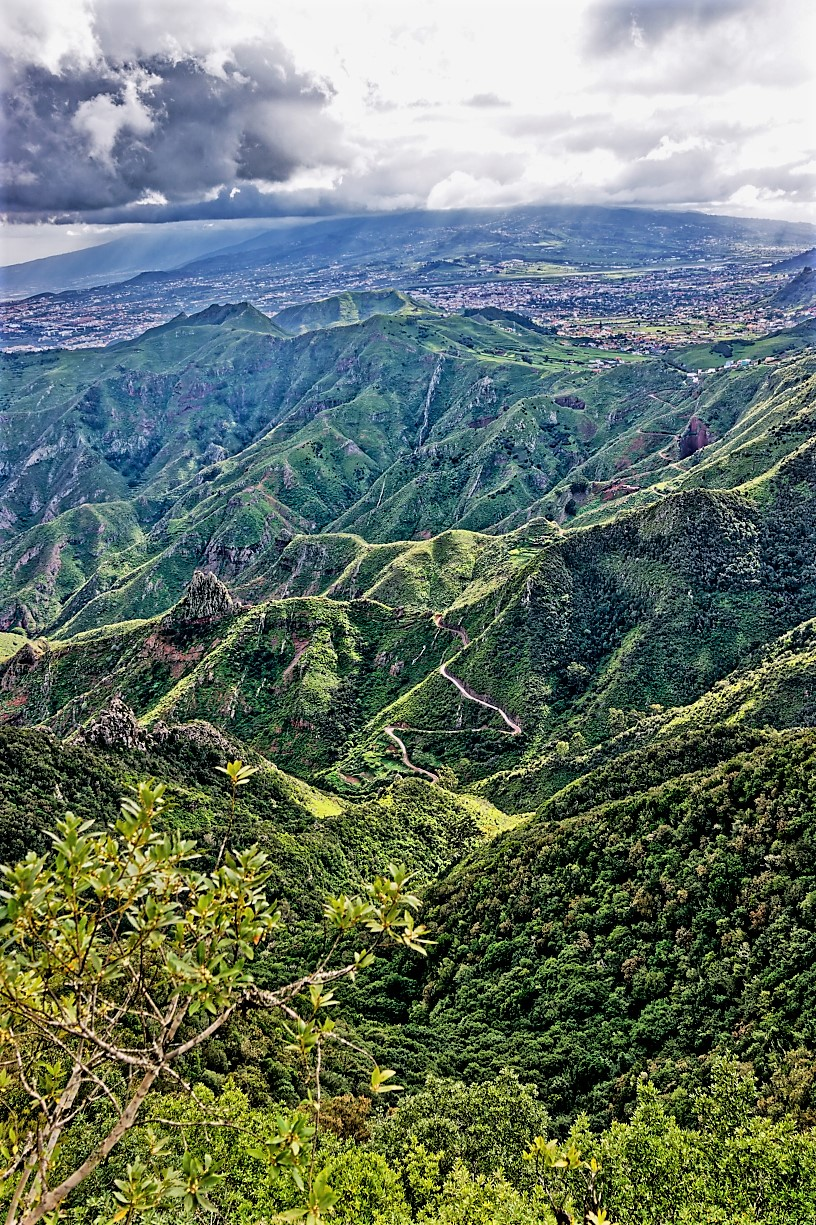

== See also ==
- Macizo de Teno
- Roques de Anaga
- Punta de Anaga Lighthouse
- Witches of Anaga
