= Anguila peluda =

Legendary creature in Canary Islands mythology

Creature information
- Other name: Anguila gigante
- Sub grouping: Lake monster

Origin
- First attested: Unknown. Before the 20th century.
- Country: Spain
- Region: Anaga, Tenerife

The Anguila peluda (in English: Hairy Eel) is a cryptozoological figure belonging to Canarian culture and folklore, specifically from the Anaga massif region, Tenerife.

According to popular legends, it was an eel of great size that inhabited a pool at Punta de Anaga, reportedly terrifying the locals. This legend ended up giving its name to the pool itself, the Charco de la Anguila in the Palmital ravine.

Historian Manuel de Ossuna y Van Den Heede, who was from La Laguna, wrote in his work Anaga y sus antigüedades (1897):

"...Among the residents of Punta de Anaga, there is a common tradition that many years ago an eel of enormous size lived in the Barranco de los Infiernos, a gorge located in a remote place in the same jurisdiction..."

The "barranco de los Infiernos" refers to the Palmital ravine. According to popular legends, the creature was a monstrous being with a head covered in hair and what was perceived as a threatening malice in its gaze. The locals, mostly peasants, thought it was a demon in disguise and that it had to be exorcised. After this, the creature was said to have died or disappeared.
