= Lost jewels of John, King of England =

Lost English Crown Jewels of King John

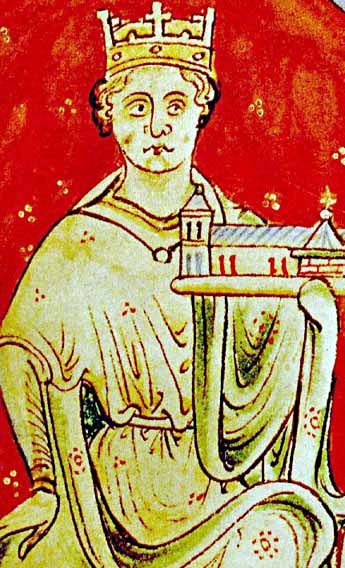
Illustration of King John of England wearing a crown

The lost jewels of John, King of England are the English royal jewellery and plate that were supposedly lost during the First Barons' War in 1216. According to legend, while returning to King's Lynn, Norfolk, from a journey to Spalding, Lincolnshire, John, King of England lost his jewels in the marshlands of The Wash when his baggage train was swamped by the incoming tide. The jewels and treasures have never been recovered after numerous failed archeological searches, to the point that their existence is contested.

== Background ==
In 1215, King John's failure to abide by Magna Carta resulted in a rebellion of English lords led by Robert Fitzwalter, known as the First Barons' War. After being offered the English throne by the rebellious lords, Prince Louis of France invaded England, forcing King John into a troublesome campaign in the east of the country. In October of 1216, King John left King's Lynn, then a coastal town, en route to Spalding when he contracted dysentery.

After resolving to return to King's Lynn by way of Wisbech, he ordered his baggage train to travel along the causeway and ford across the mouth of the Wellstream to meet him in the south. While his wagon train traversed the swampy terrain, the tide overtook the ensemble, causing his wagons to be swallowed up in muddy whirlpools along with several horses and men. Roger of Wendover chronicled the incident in his Flores Historiarum, writing:

"in crossing the river Wellester, [John] lost all his carts, waggons, and baggage horses, together with his money, costly vessels, and everything which he had a particular regard for; for the land opened in the middle of the water and caused whirlpools which sucked in every thing, as well as men and horses, so that no one escaped to tell the king of the misfortune."

Supposedly contained in the wagons were the English Crown Jewels as well as other treasures of the English Crown, which were never recovered following the incident. King John would succumb to dysentery nine days later.

== Contents ==
The actual contents of the purportedly lost treasure are highly disputed. In June 1215 King John had requested of his prelates to send all jewels, gold, and silver in their custody in order to finance his military campaign. According to historian A.V. Jenkinson, John received:

"143 cups and 14 goblets, 14 dishes, 8 flagons, 5 pairs of basins, 40 belts, 6 clasps, 16 staffs, 52 rings and 2 pendants’ – mostly in gold or silver – as well as ‘4 shrines, 2 gold crosses, 3 gold combs, a gold vessel ornamented with pearls … 2 candelabra, 2 thuribles and 3 golden phylacteries"

Jenkinson also noted that the king had in his possession a clasp studded with emeralds and rubies gifted to him by the Bishop of Norwich, and four rings he had received in 1204 from Pope Innocent III. It is also believed that he was in the possession of two sets of royal regalia, one of which formerly belonged to his grandmother Empress Matilda.

== Existence ==
Some historians dispute the reliability of the accounts of the missing jewels. Some question whether or not any treasure was actually lost. Many precious treasures and items of English Regalia were present for the coronation of John's son Henry III only 10 days later, meaning it is possible that nothing notable was lost. Additionally, the loss of the treasures of the crown would have been a major financial setback in the First Barons' War against Prince Louis, especially with the additional invasion of the Scotland around the same time. No resulting financial difficulties are noted after the incident.

Still, many historians agree that at least one crown was lost during the incident. Whether or not this was a state crown or coronation crown of the Kingdom of England is disputed. Notably the crown of Empress Matilda was never mentioned again in English records after the First Barons' War and could have been the crown cited as having gone missing during the incident at the Wash.

== Archeological missions ==
Given the jewels' value and significance to English history, several archeological expeditions have been undertaken to find them or at least prove their existence.

Several challenges have prevented large-scale excavations from taking place. The active nature of the Wash and the River Nene has caused a significant change in landscape over the last 800 years, frequently shifting around the soil, flooding and draining areas around the marshland that the treasure was supposedly lost in. The Nene itself was significantly larger in the early 1200's, with its estuary alone being several miles wide.

Additionally, much of the area around the Wash is privately owned land. Only a few archeological digs have been approved, the most recent taking place in March 2024, near Walpole Marsh, to search the area before the eventual construction of a Solar Farm.

In June 2022 a local amateur metal detectorist made headlines having claimed to have found the stash of gold and silver after discovering several nails and buckles on a farm near Sutton Bridge, Lincolnshire. No treasures or items of royal regalia have since been recovered from this site.

== See also ==
- List of missing treasures
- Blessing of Burntisland
