= Taganana =

Area of Santa Cruz de Tenerife, Tenerife

Coordinates: 28°33′38″N 16°13′04″W

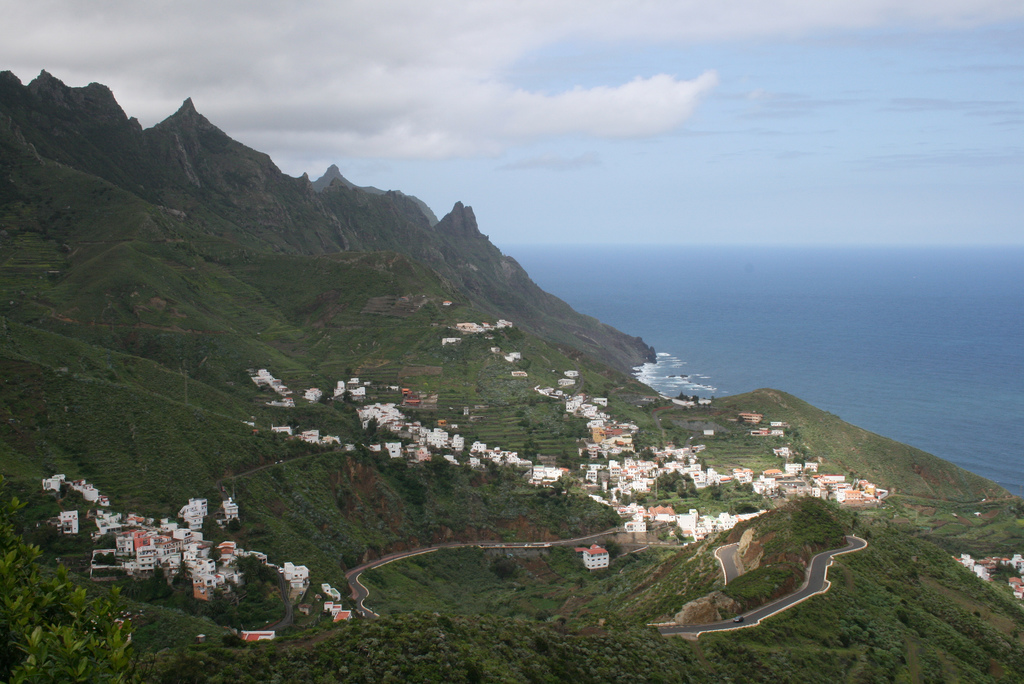
- Panorama of Taganana.

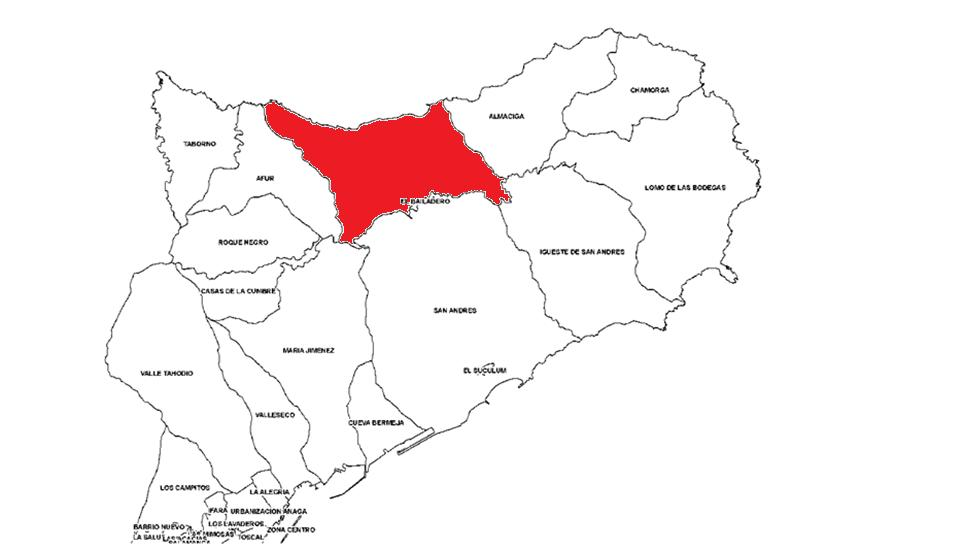
- Location of Taganana in the Anaga district
- Country: Spain
- Autonomous community: Canary Islands
- Province: Santa Cruz de Tenerife
- Municipality: Santa Cruz de Tenerife
- District: Anaga
- Boundaries: North: Atlantic Ocean; East: Almáciga; South: San Andrés and El Bailadero; West: Afur and María Jiménez
- Established: 1501

Area
  - Total: 10.21 km^{2} (3.94 sq mi)
- Elevation: 112 m (367 ft)

Population (2018)
  - Total: 511
  - Density: 50.05/km^{2} (129.6/sq mi)
- Demonym(s): Tagananero, -a
- Postal code: 38130

Taganana is a population entity within the municipality of Santa Cruz de Tenerife, on the island of Tenerife in the Canary Islands, Spain. It is administratively part of the Anaga district and is officially recognized as a village. (Note: This village status was approved by the Santa Cruz de Tenerife City Council on October 25, 2013, changing its previous classification as a neighborhood, which both Taganana and San Andrés had held since their annexation to the capital in the 19th century. This decision acknowledged the historical reality of both localities.)

It is the most significant settlement within the interior of the Macizo de Anaga. Founded in 1501, it is the third oldest settlement in the massif, following the nearby San Andrés (Note: The first settler and founder of San Andrés was Lope de Salazar in 1498, who received land in the valley during the land distribution. The land grants for Taganana, issued by Alonso Fernández de Lugo, are dated May 16, 1501, considered the founding date of the village.) and Igueste de San Andrés, (Note: The first land grant for Igueste de San Andrés was awarded to the Gran Canarian conquistador Rodrigo el Cojo in 1499.) and one of the oldest on the island. It was also an independent municipality throughout much of the 19th century.

Taganana is home to notable monuments such as the Church of Our Lady of the Snows and the Chapel of Saint Catherine. The church houses a significant artistic heritage, including sculptures, paintings, and goldsmith works. The village also preserves a rich architectural heritage of traditional houses and stone wine presses.

The village offers a network of trails for hiking, connecting to Afur, El Bailadero, and Almáciga, as well as a self-guided route through the village center highlighting its ethnographic values.

The beaches of Tachero and Roque de las Bodegas Beach are located here.

== Etymology ==
The name Taganana is of Guanche origin, with some scholars linking it to the word anagan, meaning "surrounded by mountains," or tagănan, meaning "ascent" or "slope."

== Characteristics ==
Taganana is located in the homonymous valley on the northern slope of the Macizo de Anaga, approximately 15 miles (24 km) from the municipal capital's center. It covers an area of 3.94 square miles (10.21 km^{2}) and sits at an average elevation of 367 feet (112 m) above sea level.

The village comprises several hamlets: Azanos, Bajo Roque, Casas de la Iglesia, Casas del Camino, Cruz Vieja, El Cabezo, El Calvario, El Cardonal, El Chorro, Fajanetas, La Chanca, La Cuestilla, Lomo Blanco, Lomo los Lirios, Los Naranjos, Mazapé, Portugal, Roque de las Bodegas, San Antonio, and Tachero.

The village features a church, several chapels—Saint Catherine in the village center, Saint John the Baptist in Tachero, and Virgin of Charity of Cobre in Azanos—a public square, a medical clinic, a children's playground, a pharmacy dispensary, a cultural center, a school, a sports facility, and a cemetery. It also has a pier at Roque de las Bodegas Beach, along with bars, restaurants, and small shops.

In its landscape, notable rocky formations known as Los Hombres stand out, consisting of the Roques de Las Ánimas, de Enmedio, Amogoje, and Roque del Valle. Other geological features include the Risco de la Guayosa and the Riscos del Fraile y la Monja. The coastline is dotted with numerous bajas—flat-surfaced rocky outcrops isolated in the sea.

The Monte de Las Vueltas holds significant scientific interest, preserving an excellent example of laurel forest.

The entire area of Taganana is part of the Anaga Rural Park, and like other villages and hamlets in Anaga, it is included in the biosphere reserve of the Macizo de Anaga, designated by UNESCO in 2015.

=== Topography ===
The basal unit of Taganana emerges along the northern coast in a crescent-shaped outline—known as the Taganana Arc—possibly formed by greater marine penetration in the central area, which is more easily erodible due to its predominantly volcanic composition. This basal unit, equivalent in age to the fissure basalts of the Macizo de Teno (Upper Miocene), dips southward, opposite to the overlying formations. The high alteration of its materials, its dense network of rocks—formed by basaltic and phonolitic intrusions such as the Roques de Anaga and Roque de Las Ánimas—and the direction of its dip suggest a clear unconformity between this unit and those resting upon it.

== Demographics ==
With 521 inhabitants as of 2016, Taganana is the sixth most populous locality in the Anaga District, following San Andrés, María Jiménez, Valleseco, La Alegría, and Igueste de San Andrés.

Population distribution of Taganana (2016)
Name	Category	Population
Taganana	Principal nucleus	149
Azanos	Minor entity	68
Bajo el Roque	Minor entity	26
El Cabezo	Minor entity	23
El Calvario	Minor entity	20
El Cardonal	Minor entity	28
Casas del Camino	Minor entity	15
La Cuestilla	Minor entity	35
Fajanetas	Minor entity	18
Lomo Blanco	Minor entity	14
Lomo Los Lirios	Minor entity	19
Mazapé	Minor entity	14
Portugal	Minor entity	39
San Antonio	Minor entity	47
Tachero	6	
TOTAL LOCALIDAD		521

Demographic variation of Taganana
Year	2000	2001	2002	2003	2004	2005	2006	2007	2008	2009	2010	2011	2012	2013	2014	2015	2016
Population	668	653	704	688	633	630	642	638	620	592	589	566	559	555	545	528	521

== History ==
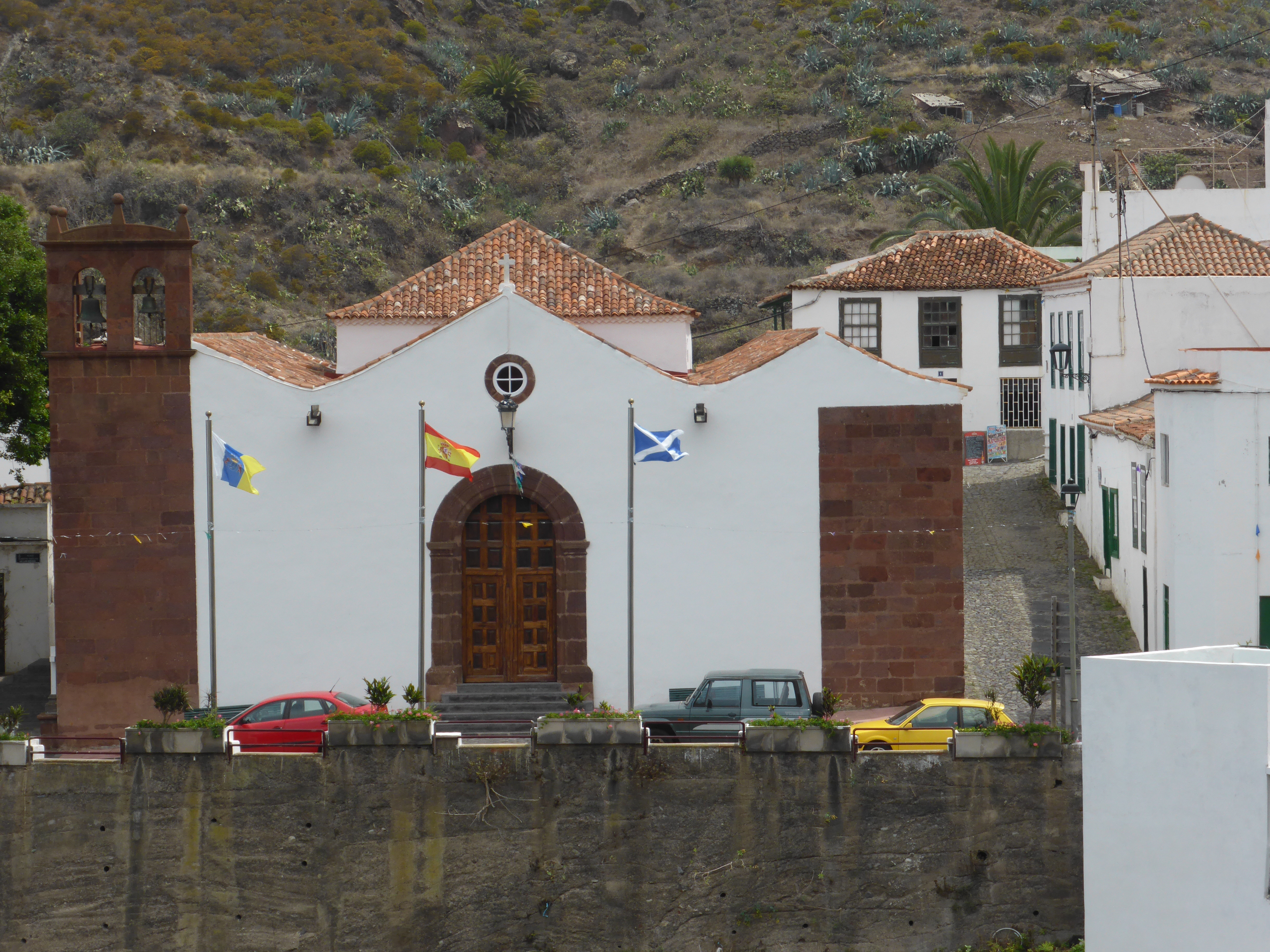
Church of Our Lady of the Snows.

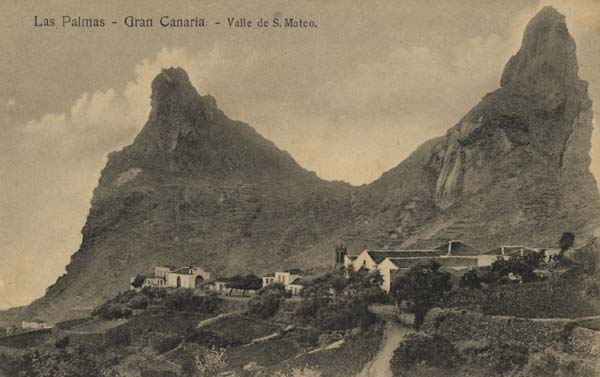
The village of Taganana around 1905.

The Taganana valley has been inhabited since the Guanche era, as evidenced by numerous archaeological findings, and was part of the Menceyato of Anaga.

Along the trail between Taganana and Afur lies the so-called Piedra de los Guanches, an archaeological site linked to the Guanche mummification practices. This indigenous monument is also known as the Taganana Stone.

Following the conquest of Tenerife in 1496, land distribution began among conquerors and settlers. Taganana was founded in 1501 through one such grant to a group of settlers from Lanzarote and Fuerteventura. However, it was already inhabited shortly after the conquest by these settlers and free Guanches.

Don Alonso de Lugo, governor of the islands of Tenerife and La Palma, grants to you, the residents of this island who have come from the island of Fuerteventura and some from Lanzarote—namely Grygorio Tabordo, Juan Perdomo, and Gyrónimo—a place called Taganana with its lands and waters in the region. Dated May 16, 1501. Those receiving this land are Pero Hernandes and his son Pedro de Vera, Gonçalo Mexía, Francisco Guillama, Pícar, Juan Delgado, Robín, Andrés Sanches, Pero Negrín, Alº Sanches, and those from Lanzarote. I grant you the Taganana valley with its water and lands for sugarcane fields and vineyards. Alº de Lugo.

— Datas de Tenerife (Books I to IV). Elías Serra Ráfols.

Thus, Taganana is one of Tenerife's oldest settlements and the third oldest in the Macizo de Anaga, after San Andrés (founded three years earlier) and Igueste de San Andrés (founded two years earlier).

From the 16th century, alongside San Andrés, it was a key hub in Anaga, with its own parish by at least 1505 and a mayor and constable by 1518. Its lands were initially dedicated to sugarcane cultivation, leading to the construction of the Las Vueltas Road to transport the harvest. This road was the massif's most important communication route, linking Taganana to San Cristóbal de La Laguna, then the island's capital, and branching off to connect other valleys like San Andrés, El Bufadero, and Afur.

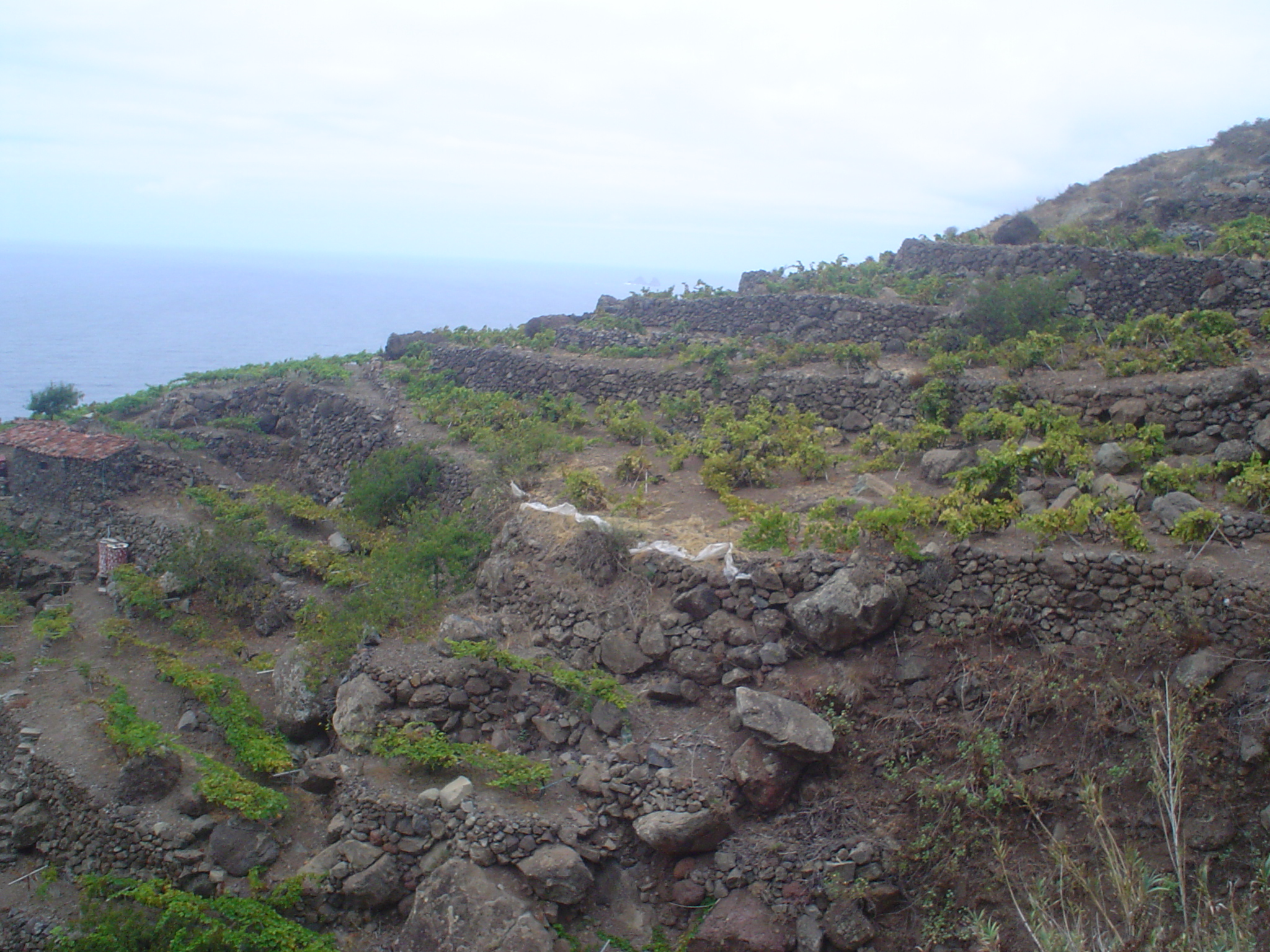
Vineyard plots.

From the 17th century, the sugarcane trade declined, giving way to intensive viticulture, which remains a defining feature of Taganana today.

In 1813, Taganana became an independent municipality under the Cádiz Constitution but requested annexation to Santa Cruz de Tenerife in 1850 due to financial difficulties. It sought to restore its municipal status in 1859 but was denied. In 1868, a revolutionary council was established, lasting until 1877, when it was permanently annexed to the capital. This history of independence, combined with its isolation until recent times, has fostered a strong village identity among residents.

The former Taganana municipality, corresponding to the Las Nieves parish territory, stretched from the Taborno Ravine to the Roque de Antequera, separated from the San Andrés Valley municipality by the Anaga ridge. It included the hamlets of Taborno, Afur, Almáciga, Benijo, El Draguillo, Las Palmas, and Punta de Anaga.

After annexation, Taganana retained a local mayor until 1967 and its own justice of the peace and civil registry until 1976.

The first school opened in 1852, with primary education continuing at the Julián Rojas de Vera School.

The 20th century brought improved public services, particularly after the road arrived in 1968. In 1994, Taganana was incorporated into the protected Anaga Rural Park.

In 2006, the Taganana hamlets of Roque de las Bodegas and Tachero, along with other coastal Anaga settlements, were declared out of compliance after the Ministry of Environment set the maritime-terrestrial boundary at 328 feet (100 m) from the highest tide mark. These areas await recognition as urban zones by the Coastal Authority.

=== History of Our Lady of the Snows ===
According to tradition, the statue of the Virgin was found by settler Gregorio Tabordo on the El Cardonal coast during a storm in the 16th century, abandoned by a ship fleeing the weather.

== Economy ==
While many residents work in the service sector outside the village, Taganana sustains a subsistence agriculture based on vineyards, potatoes, sweet potatoes, and vegetables. It also offers dining options in the village center and Roque de las Bodegas.

== Festivals ==
The patronal feasts are held on August 5 in honor of Our Lady of the Snows, featuring three processions: the eve with fireworks, the main day at noon, and August 15 (the Octave) at noon. The lowering and raising of the statue from the main ausing a mechanized system, are also poignant events.

- Saint Catherine of Alexandria on November 25.
- During Holy Week, notable events include the Good Friday procession of the Dead Christ and the centuries-old Burning of Judas the night before Easter Sunday.

== Transportation ==
The village is accessed via the Taganana Road TF-134.

=== Public Transport ===
Taganana is served by the following TITSA bus line:

Line	Route	Schedules
946	Santa Cruz (Intercambiador) - San Andrés - Taganana - Almáciga	Horario/Línea

Taganana features several hiking trails, most certified within the Tenerife Trail Network:

- PR-TF 4 Trail El Bailadero - Taganana.
  - PR-TF 4.1 Trail Branch to Roque de las Bodegas Beach.
- PR-TF 8 Trail Loop: Afur - Taganana.
- Taganana Interpretive Trail.

== Places of Interest ==
- Church of Our Lady of the Snows (BIC)
- Chapel of Saint Catherine (BIC)
- Roque de las Bodegas Beach
- Monte de Las Vueltas

== Gallery ==
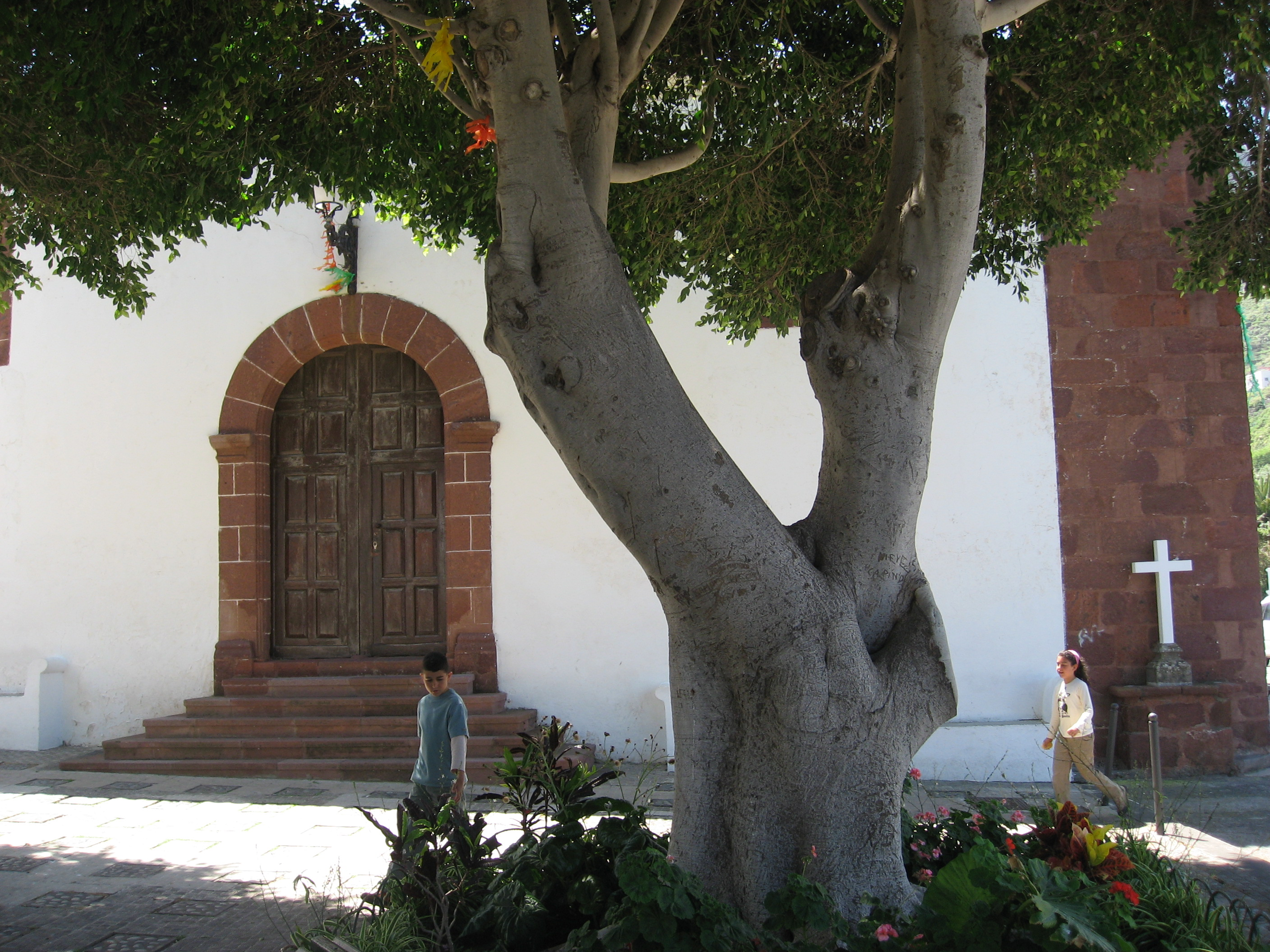
Church of Our Lady of the Snows

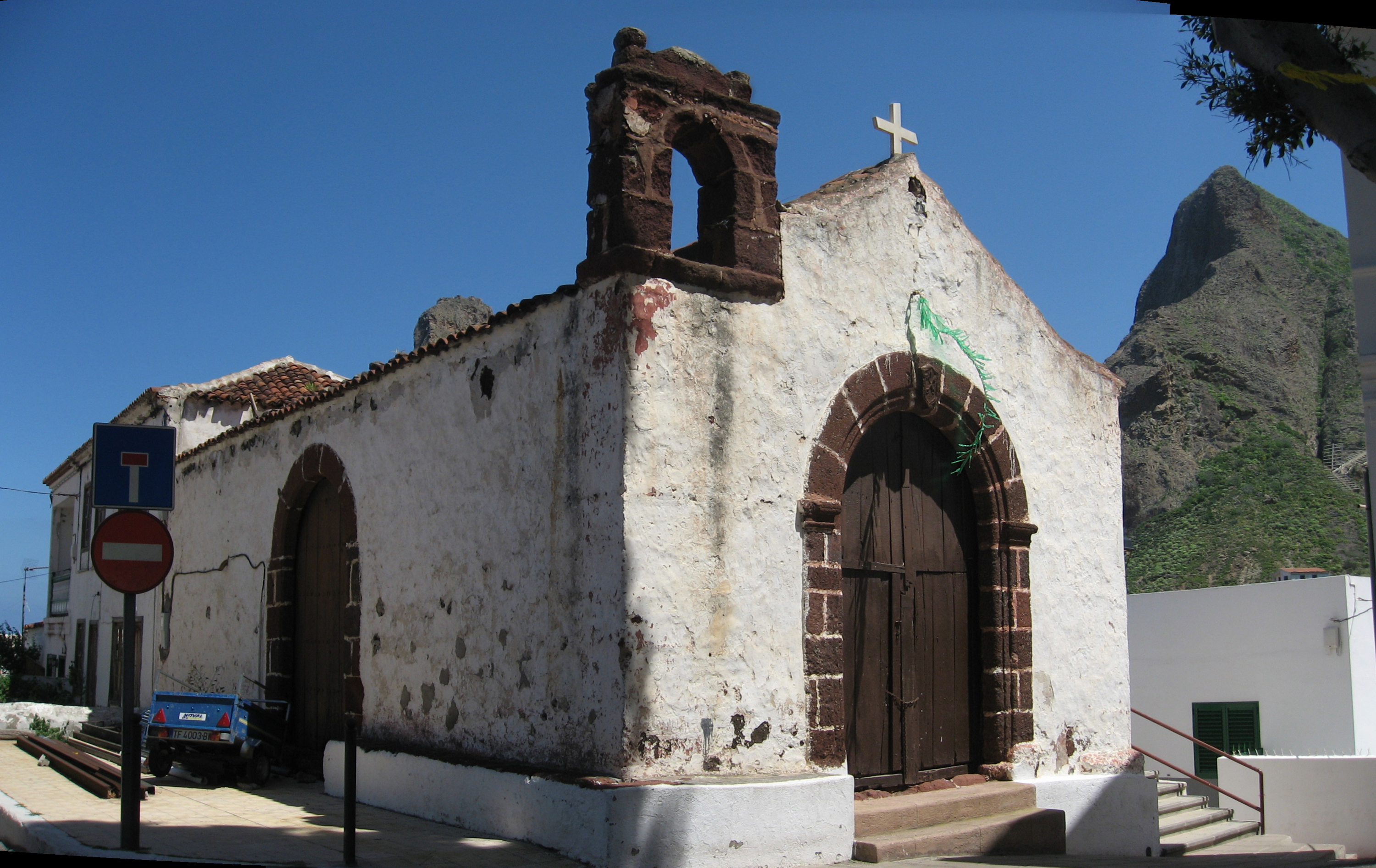
Chapel of Saint Catherine before restoration

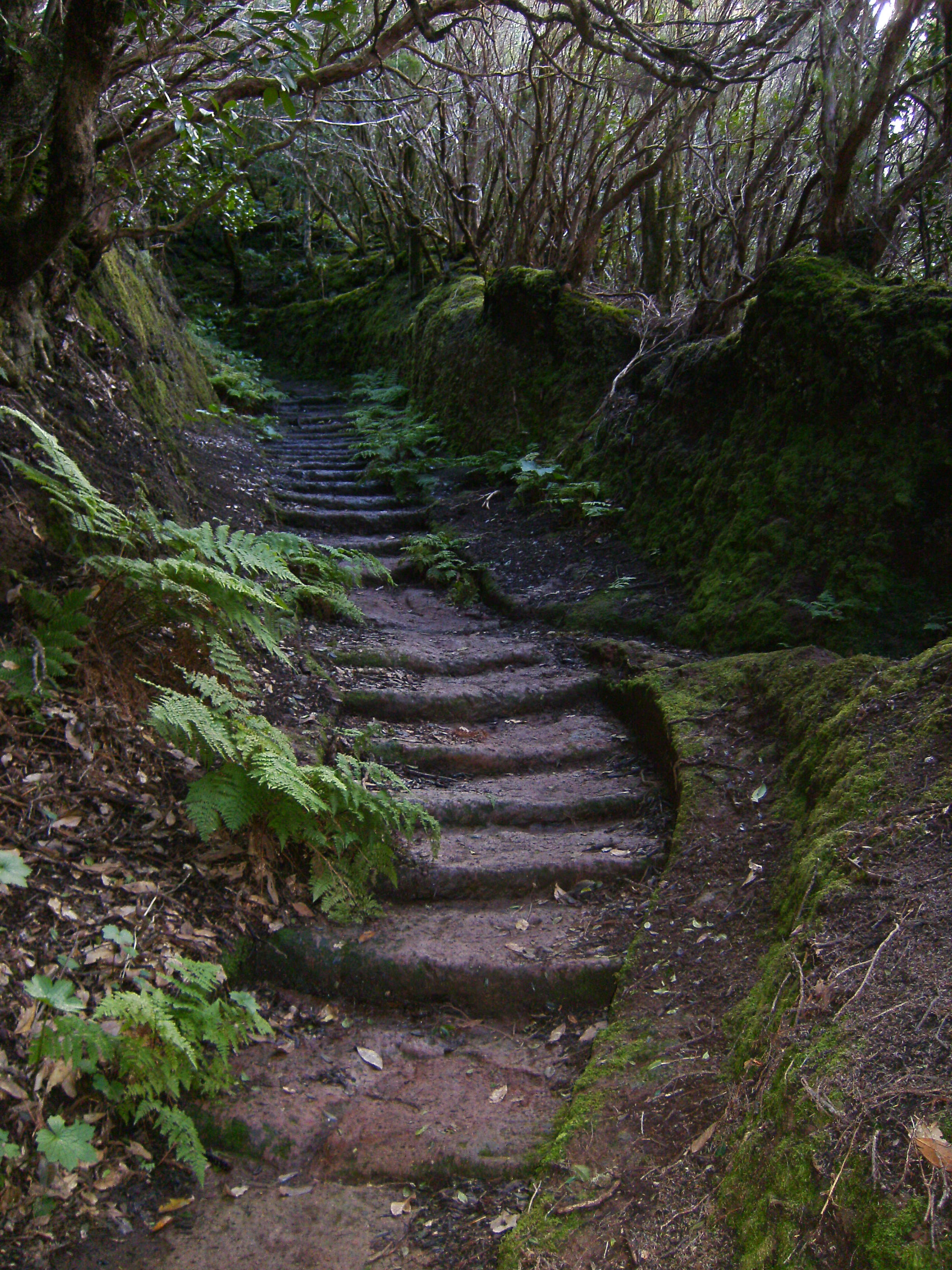
Las Vueltas Road in Taganana

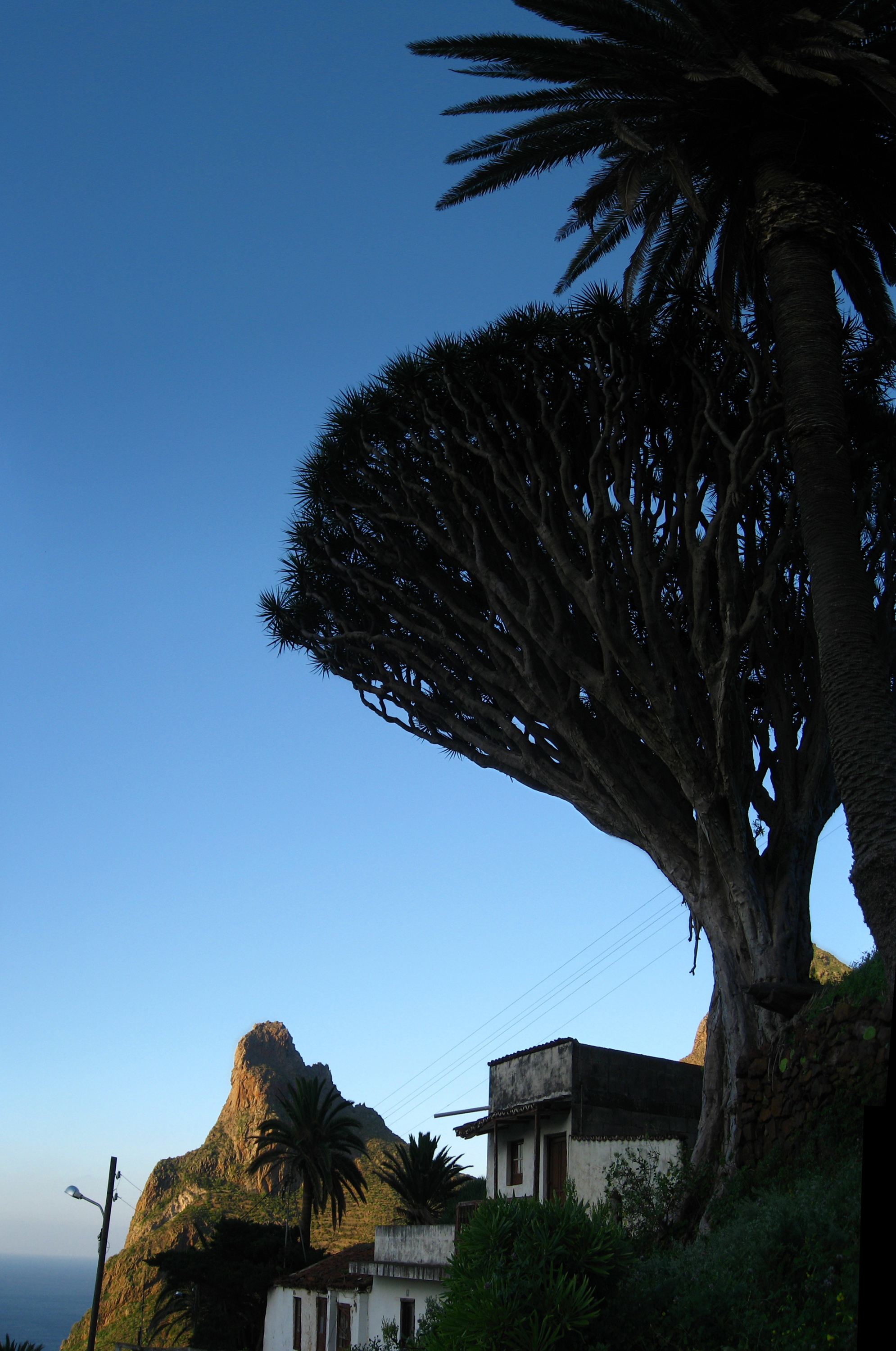
Taganana

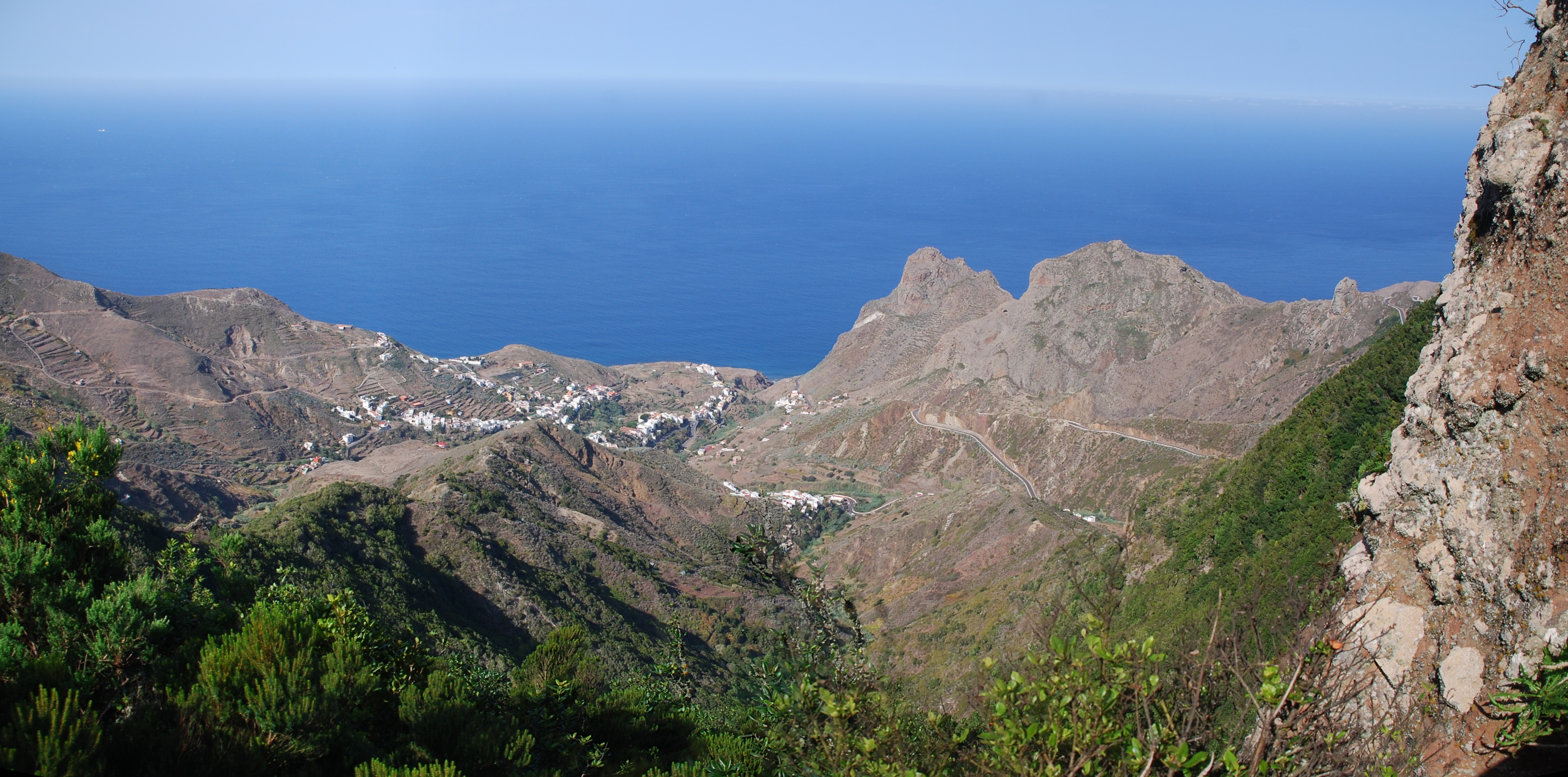
Taganana Valley

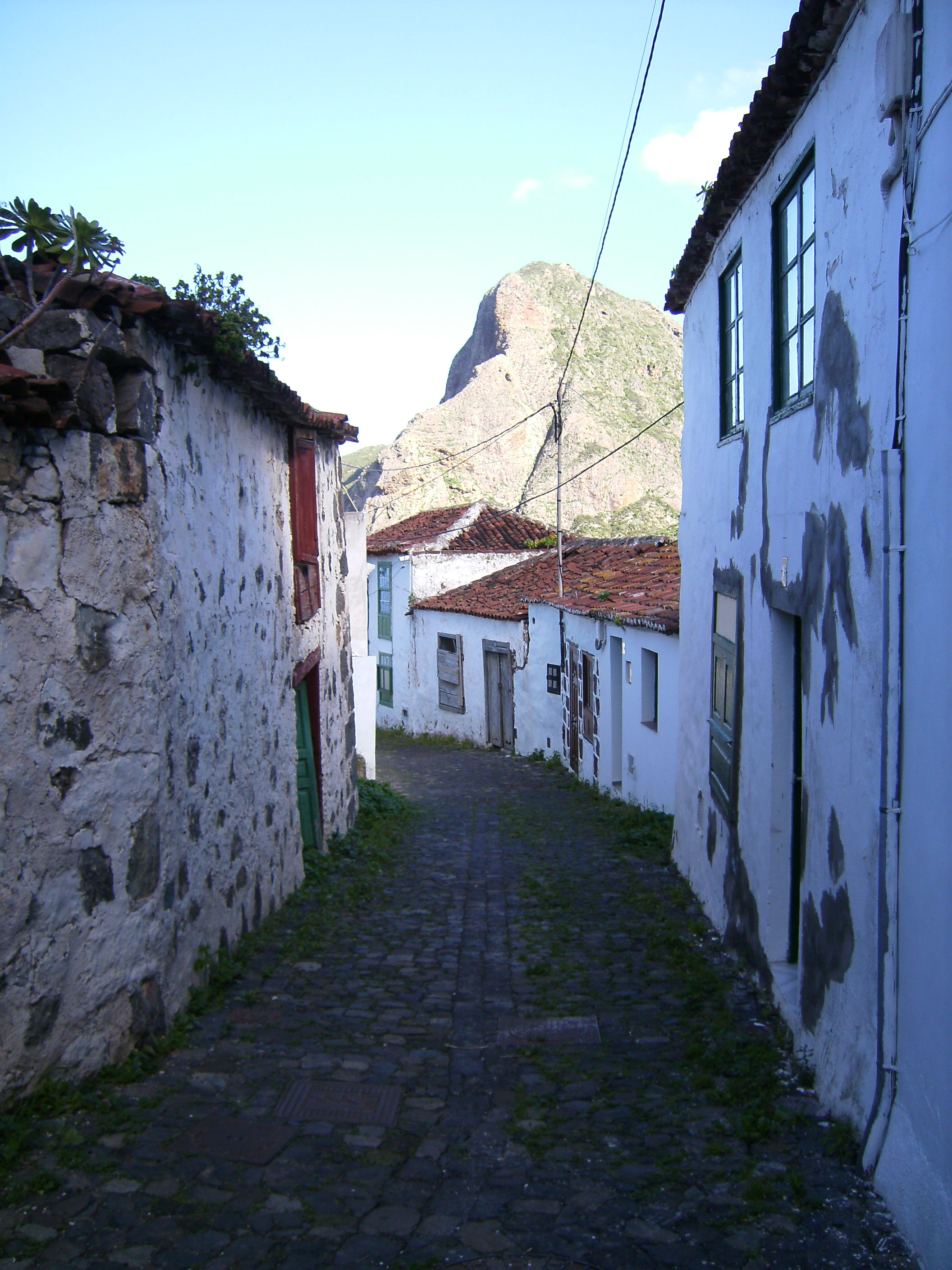
Traditional architecture sample, Portugal

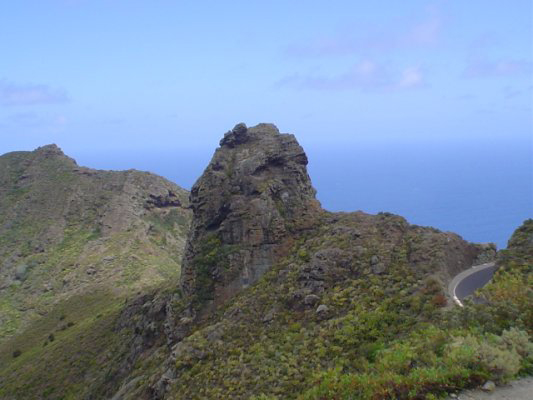
Roque Amogoje, known as "Taganana’s Lion"

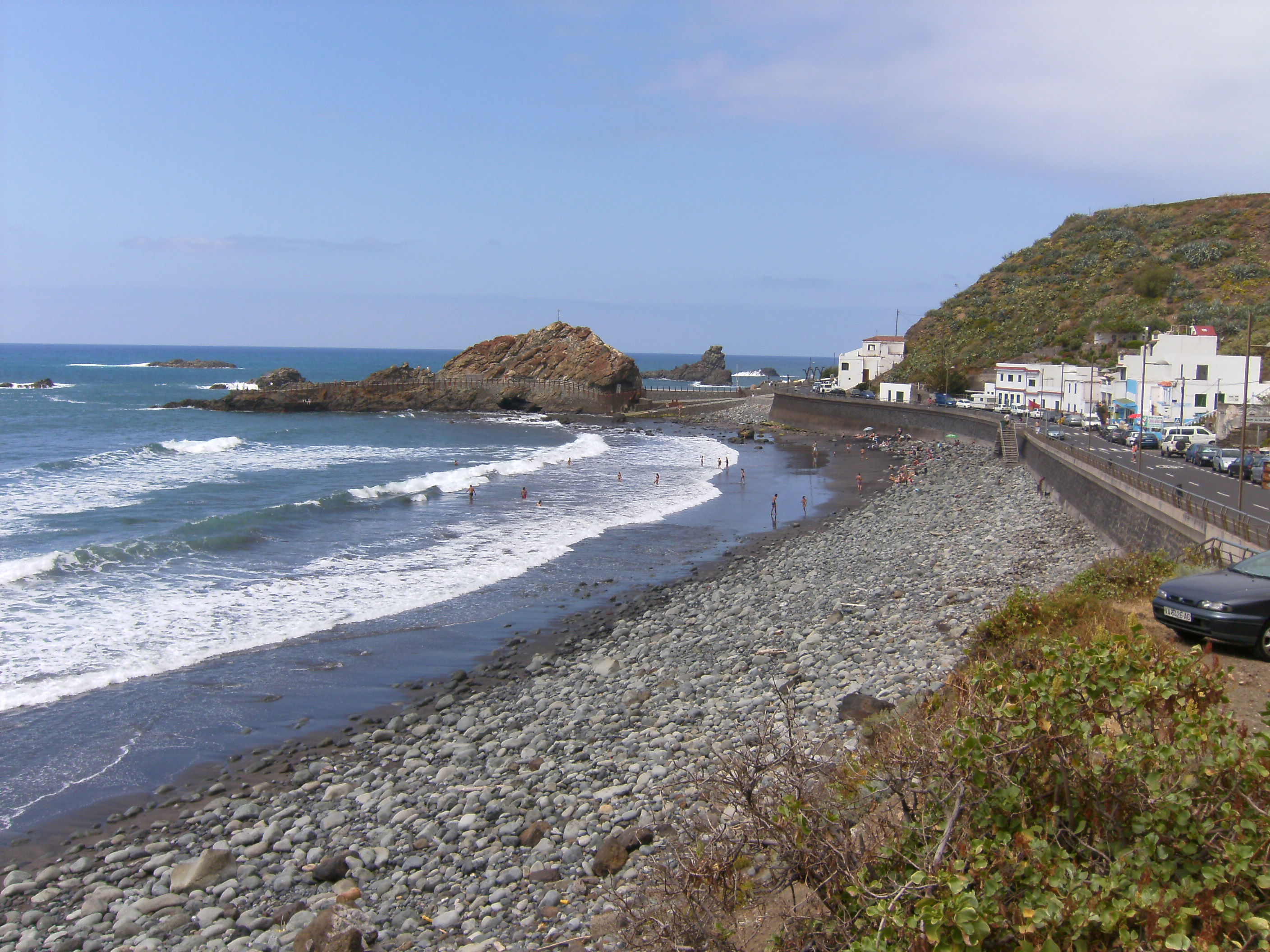
Roque de las Bodegas Beach

== See also ==
- Macizo de Anaga

== Bibliography ==
- Serra Ráfols, E. (1978). Las Datas de Tenerife (Libros I a IV de datas originales) [The Land Grants of Tenerife (Books I to IV)] (in Spanish). Spanish National Research Council, Institute of Canarian Studies at the University of La Laguna. ISBN 84-500-2568-0.
- Martín Hernández, U. (2006). Historia general de la comarca de Anaga [General History of the Anaga Region] (in Spanish). Ediciones Idea. ISBN 978-84-96740-00-6.
