= Cherub with Chariot (Fabergé egg) =

1888 Imperial Fabergé egg

Cherub with Chariot Fabergé egg
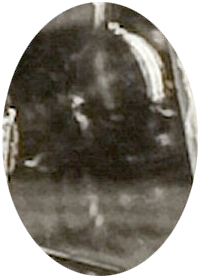
- The egg's blurry reflection in 1902
- Year delivered: 1888
- Customer: Alexander III
- Recipient: Maria Feodorovna

Current owner
- Individual or institution: Lost
- Year of acquisition: N/A

Design and materials
- Workmaster: Unknown
- Materials used: Gold, sapphire, diamonds
- Height: Unknown
- Width: Unknown
- Surprise: Likely a clock inside the egg, shaped like an angel

The Cherub with Chariot egg or Angel with Egg in Chariot is a Tsar Imperial Fabergé egg, one of a series of fifty-two jeweled eggs made under the supervision of Peter Carl Fabergé for the Russian Imperial family. It was crafted and delivered in 1888 to the Tsar of Russia, Alexander III. Being one of the lost Imperial eggs, few details are known about it.

== Design ==
Illustration of the Cherub with Chariot Faberge egg. This illustration is a "best guess" based on written descriptions and on the only photo in which its reflection appears against a pane of glass in a vitrine in 1902

The exact design of the Cherub with Chariot Egg is uncertain. A single photograph of the egg exists, though it is hidden by another egg and can only be seen in a blurry reflection. There is a brief description from the imperial records in the Russian State Historical Archives in Moscow which describes the gift as "Angel pulling chariot with egg - 1500 roubles, angel with a clock in a gold egg 600 roubles." According to Marina Lopato in Fabergé: Imperial Jeweller (1993) this description means the clock is inside the gold egg, which is in the chariot being pulled by the angel. Fabergé's invoice carries a similar description, itemizing a cherub pulling a chariot with an egg and a cherub with clock in a gold egg. These two descriptions are backed up by the 1917 inventory of seized imperial treasure which reads "gold egg, decorated with brilliants (diamonds), a sapphire; with a silver, golded [sic] stand in the form of a two-wheeled wagon with a putto."

== Surprise ==
The surprise was a clock inside the egg on the chariot. The exact design is not known.

== History of the egg ==
The egg would have been presented to Maria Feodorovna on April 24, 1888 by Alexander III. The egg was kept in the Gatchina Palace in 1891, and was one of 40 or so eggs sent to the Armory Palace of the Kremlin in 1917 after the Revolution by the Provisional Government. In 1922, it was transferred to the Sovnarkom, after which the exact whereabouts of the egg are unknown. In the 1930s Victor and Armand Hammer may have purchased the egg. A sales catalog for Armand Hammer's 1934 exhibition at Lord and Taylor in New York City describes a "miniature silver amour holding wheelbarrow with Easter Egg, made by Fabergé, court jeweler", which seems to describe the Cherub with Chariot Egg. Armand Hammer may have been unaware of the significance of this item if it was in fact the 1888 Imperial egg, since he had a habit of promoting imperial items yet did not make an effort to promote this egg. Whether this was the 1888 egg, and where it is today is unknown.

== See also ==
- Egg decorating
- List of missing treasure
