= Roques de Anaga =

Protected area consisting of two monolithic rocks in Spain

Coordinates: 28.598°N 16.159°W

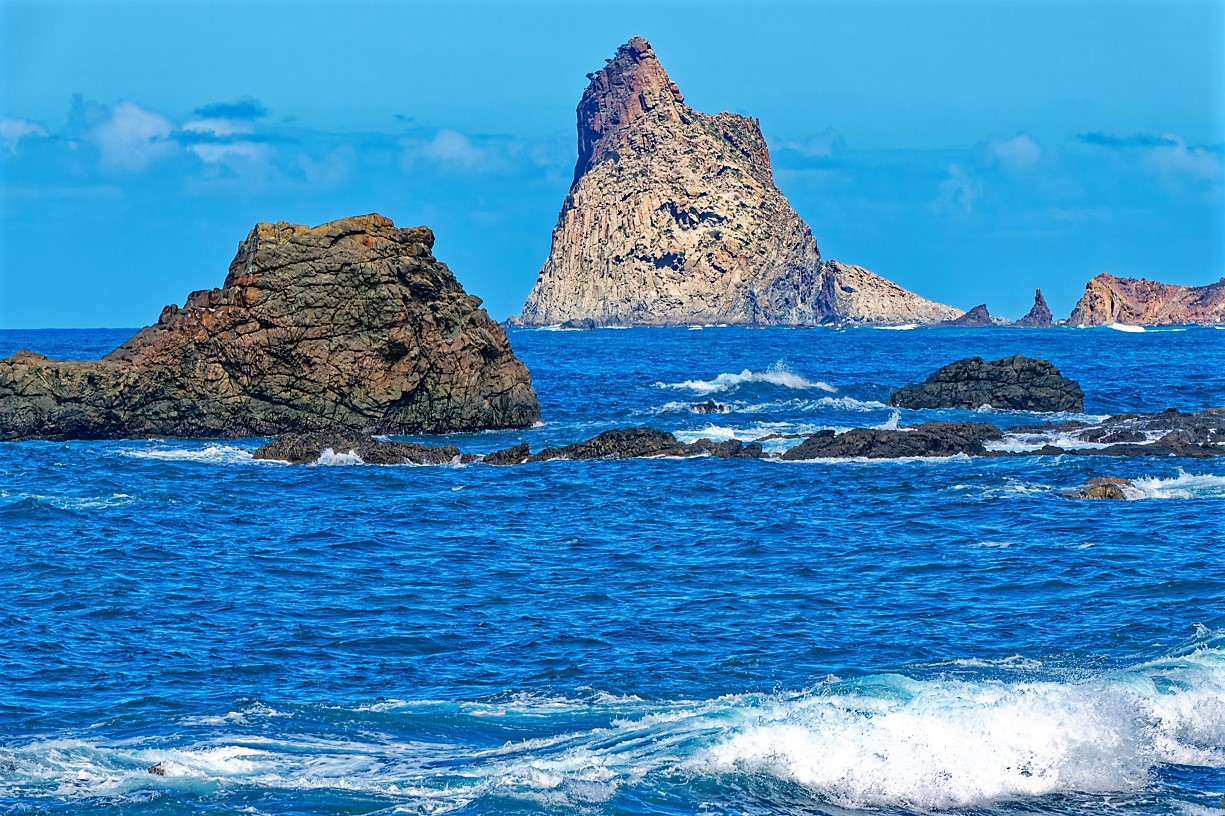
Roques de Anaga.

The Roques de Anaga are two monolithic rocks forming some of the most emblematic natural monuments of Tenerife (Canary Islands, Spain). Roque de Tierra stands 179 meters above sea level and is closer to the main island while Roque de Fuera, at 66 meters above sea level, is further away. Both rocks are also included in the European Union's Natura 2000 ecological network of protected areas. They are located off the north-east coast of Tenerife.

== Natural history ==
Roques de Anaga is a part of the Anaga Rural Park and has been classified as a Special Protection Area for birds. The site has also been recognised as an Important Bird Area (IBA) by BirdLife International because the rocks support breeding populations of band-rumped storm petrels, little shearwaters and Bulwer's petrels.

The rocky landscape of Anaga

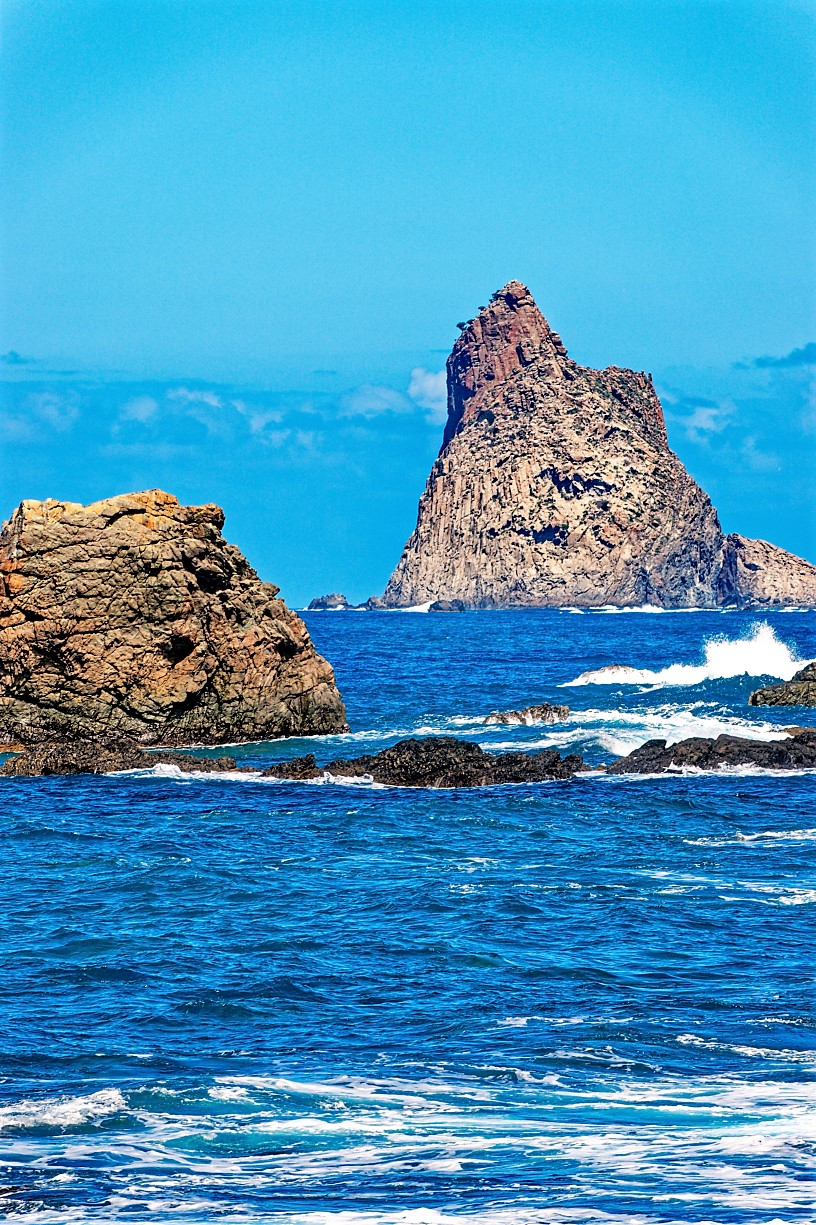

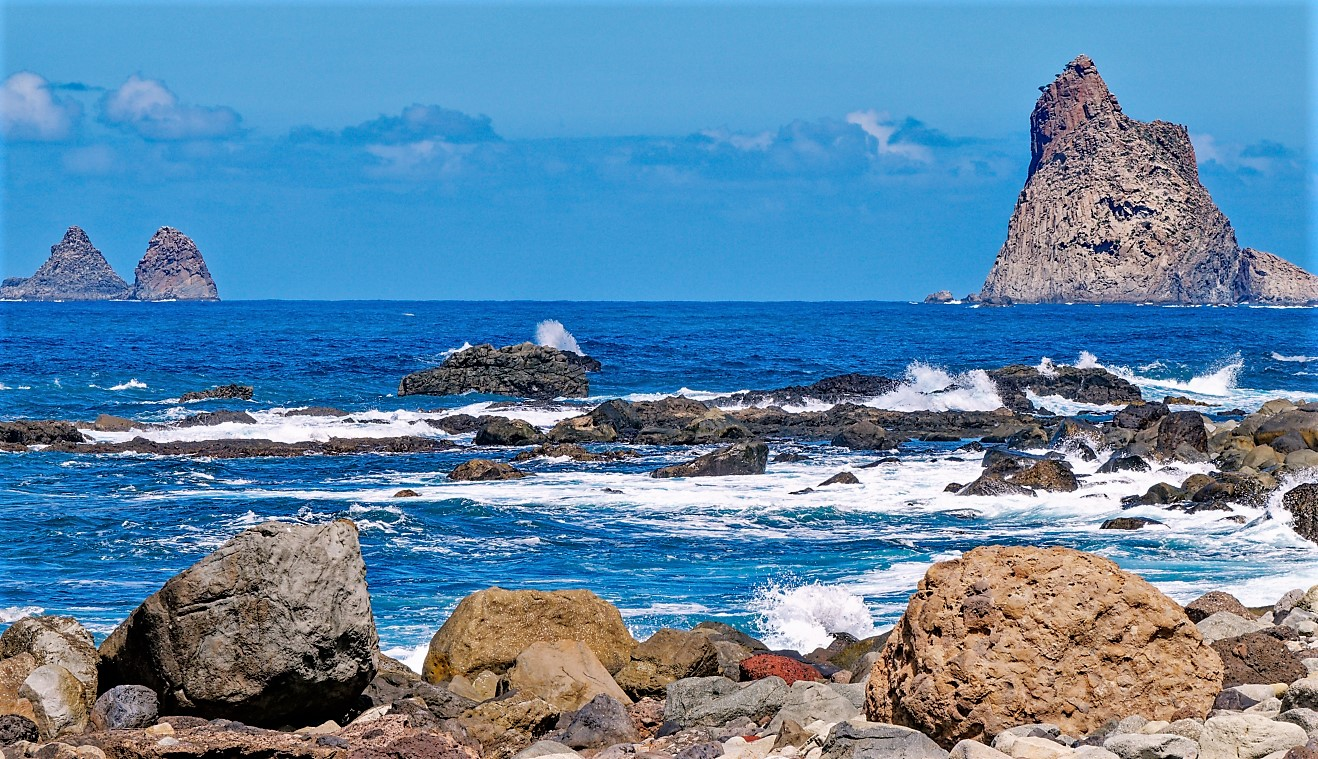

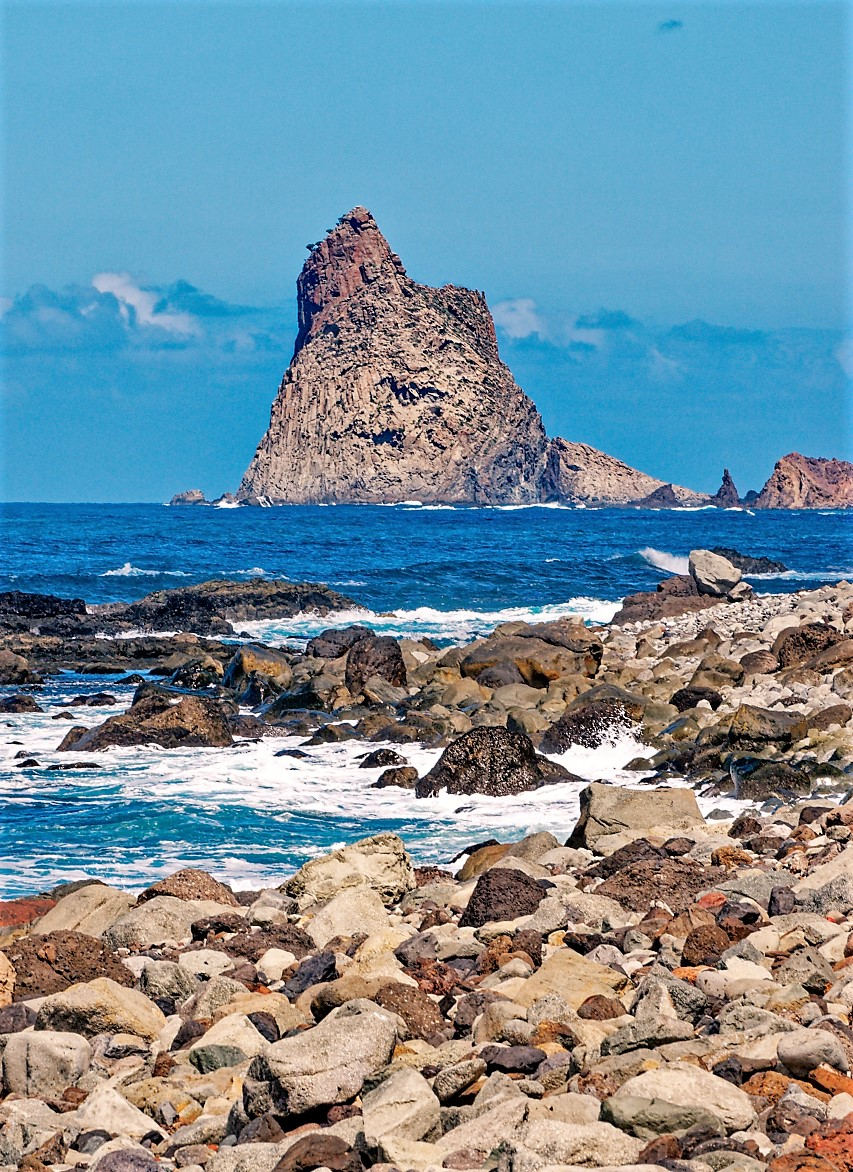

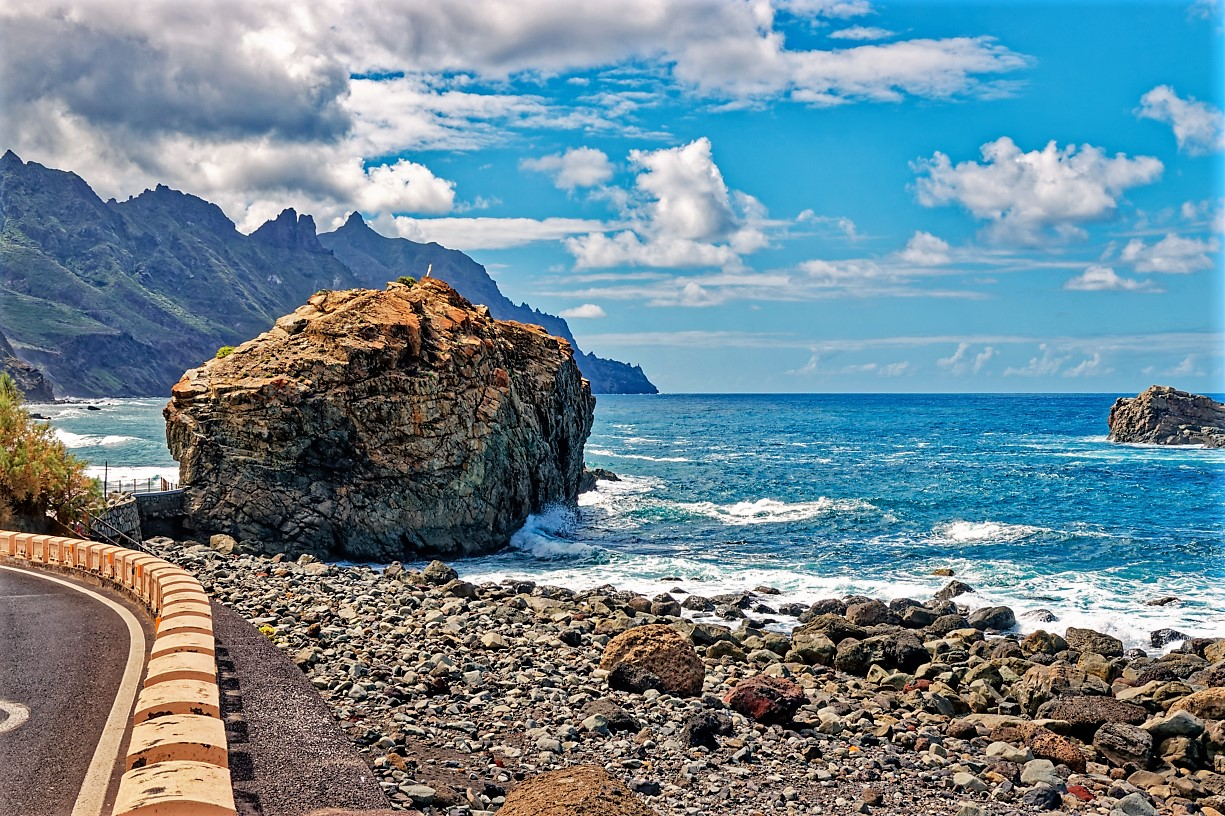

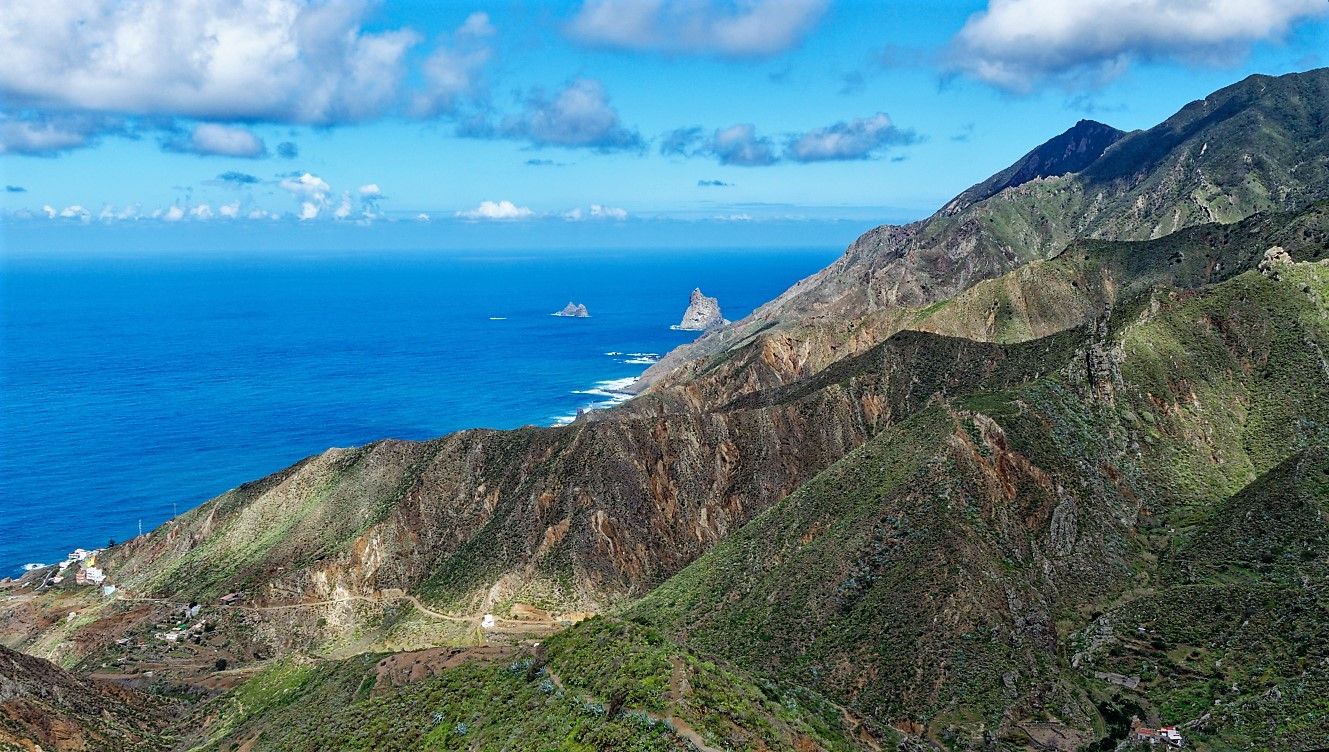

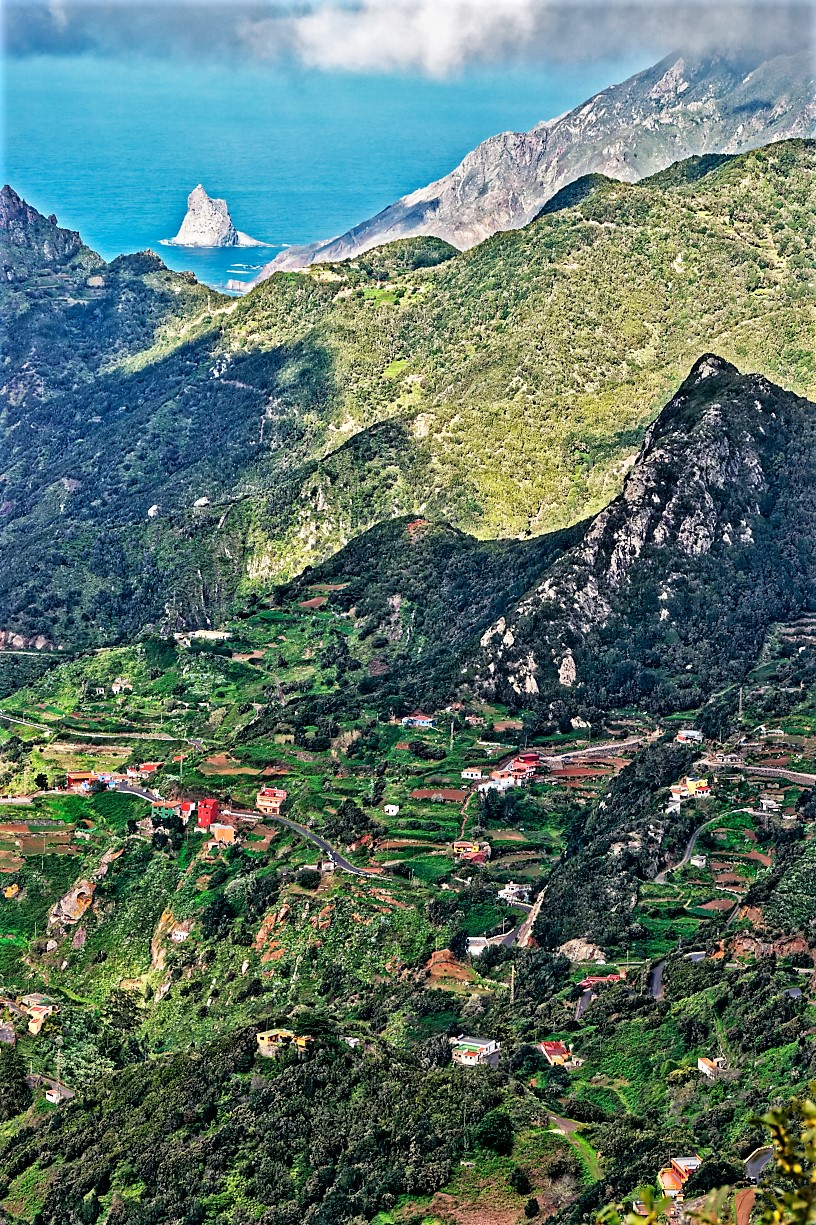
