= Antwerp diamond heist =

2003 heist in Antwerp, Belgium

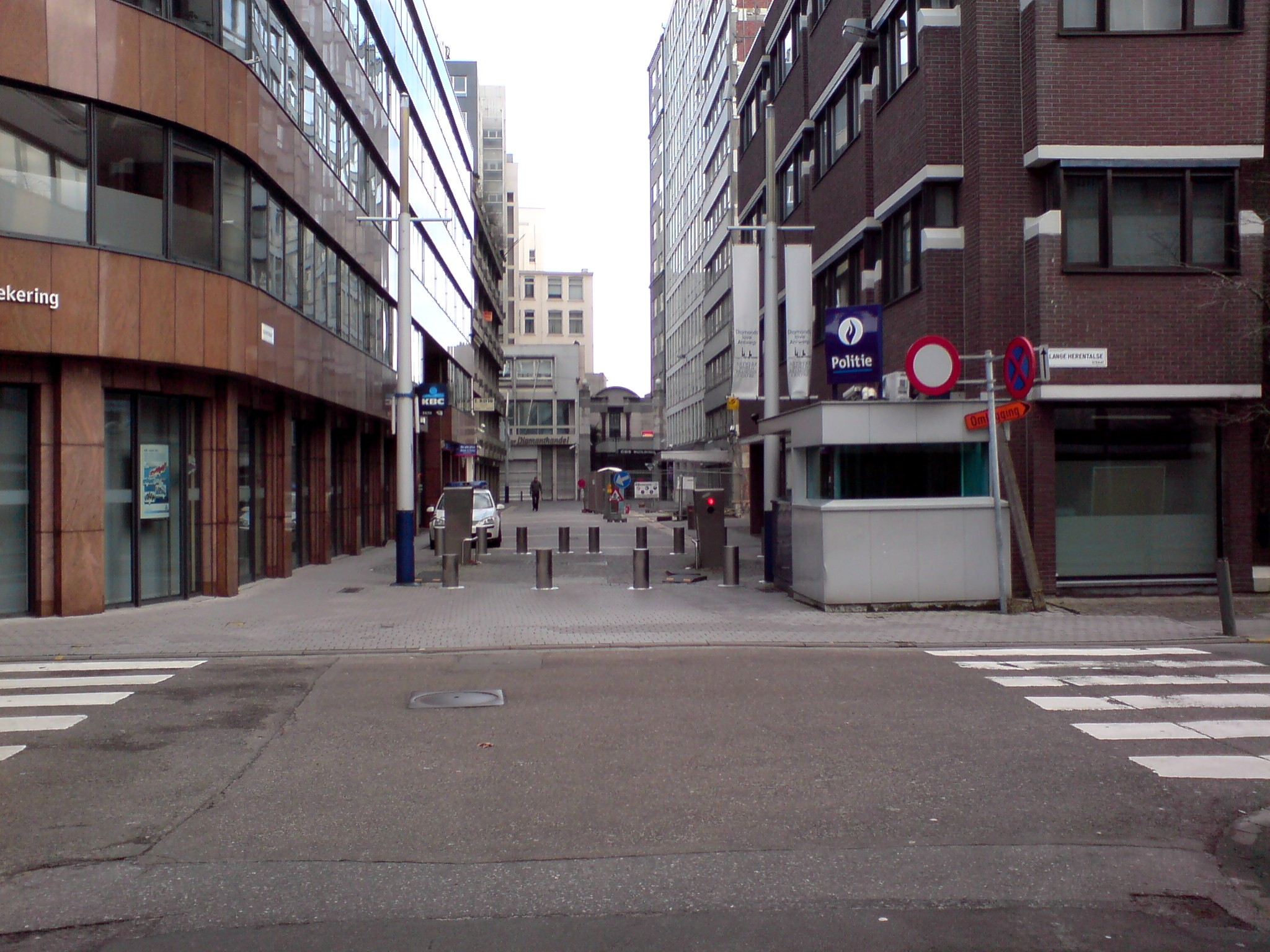
- The Antwerp Diamond Center
- Date: February 15–16, 2003
- Location: Antwerp, Belgium; 51.2162°N 4.4177°E
- Type: Heist
- Participants: Leonardo Notarbartolo, Ferdinando Finotto, Elio D'Onorio, Pietro Tavano, and unidentified co-conspirators
- Outcome: More than $100 million of property stolen
- Missing: Diamonds, gold, silver, other types of jewellery, cash, and securities
- Sentence: 10 years imprisonment for Leonardo Notarbartolo, 5 years for the other participants

The Antwerp diamond heist, dubbed the "heist of the century", was the largest ever diamond heist and one of the largest robberies in history. Thieves stole loose diamonds, gold, silver and other types of jewellery valued at more than $100 million. It took place in Antwerp, Belgium, during the weekend of 15–16 February 2003. Though arrests were made and time was served, most of the diamonds stolen remain unrecovered.

== Site ==
The vault that housed the diamonds is situated two floors below the main floor. It was protected by multiple security mechanisms, including an advanced combination lock, infrared heat detectors, a seismic sensor, Doppler radar, and a magnetic field detector. The building itself had a private security force and was located in the heavily guarded and monitored Antwerp diamond district.

== Robbery ==
Leonardo Notarbartolo rented an office in the Antwerp Diamond Center building at 9/11 Schupstraat in the Antwerp Diamond District. This office provided him access to a safe deposit box in the vault beneath the building. It took him over two years to prepare for the robbery.

To circumvent the security systems of the vault, the group employed a series of sophisticated techniques. Notarbartolo conducted detailed surveillance of the Diamond Center. He alleged that the group installed a small camera above the vault door to monitor the guards and record the vault's combination, transmitting footage to a storage device concealed in a fire extinguisher.

At some point, probably before the robbery, Notarbartolo visited the vault under the guise of a routine trip and sprayed hair spray on the thermal-motion sensor to temporarily disable it. The vault's magnetic lock, which relied on a magnetic field between two plates to trigger an alarm if broken, was bypassed by carefully removing the bottom portion of the screws securing the plates while the magnetic field was inactive earlier that week and using adhesive tape to keep them in place. During the heist, they used a custom aluminum plate to keep the plates together, and so maintain the magnetic field, when opening the vault door.

The thieves used a long two-part, three-dimensional key to open the vault door along with its combination. They turned off the lights then opened the vault door. Next, they used a crowbar to pry open the day gate.

To avoid detection by the infrared sensor in the vault, a thief used a polystyrene shield to block his thermal signature and secured the shield in front of the sensor. The group also covered the ceiling light sensor with tape and then turned on the lights inside the vault to work undetected.

Once inside, the thieves used a custom-made, hand-cranked device to break open 109 (Note: Initial reports such as the BBC News had the incorrect figure of 123.) of the 189 safe deposit boxes, each equipped with both a unique key lock and a three-letter combination lock. After the robbery, the group returned to Notarbartolo's apartment in Antwerp. Later, Notarbartolo and an accomplice dumped trash from the heist and from their safe house near the E19 motorway between Antwerp and Brussels.

The next morning, the landowner (August Van Camp) discovered the discarded items and notified the police. Among the debris were items linked directly to Notarbartolo, providing investigators with a critical lead.

== Perpetrators ==
The theft was carried out by a team including Leonardo Notarbartolo, a professional thief who was skilled in social manipulation. Detectives from Antwerp's Diamond Detective Squad arrested him when he returned to the Antwerp Diamond Center five days after the heist, February 21. He'd been connected to the crime by evidence found in the team's garbage, including DNA evidence from a partially eaten salami sandwich.

They were members of a loose affiliation of Italian thieves called "The School of Turin" ("La Scuola di Torino").

In addition to Notarbartolo, the team consisted of at least four other members, whom Notarbartolo gave aliases during interviews, though he refused to specify whom each alias referred to:

- Speedy – described as an anxious and paranoid man, he was a long-time friend of Notarbartolo and was the one responsible for scattering the rubbish in the woods. Belgian police believe this to be Pietro Tavano.
- The Monster – described as a tall, muscular man, he was apparently an expert lock picker, electrician, mechanic and driver and was very strong. Belgian police believe this to be Ferdinando Finotto.
- The Genius – a specialist in alarm systems. Belgian police believe this to be Elio D'Onorio, an electronics expert known to be linked to a series of robberies.
- The King of Keys – an older man, he was described as one of the best key forgers in the world. His true identity is unknown.

Notarbartolo was found guilty of orchestrating the heist. He was sentenced to 10 years in prison by the court of appeal of Antwerp in 2005, but was released on parole in 2009. In 2011, a European Arrest Warrant was issued against him after he was found to have violated his parole conditions. One of these conditions was that he needed to compensate the victims of the heist, which he never did. As a consequence, he was arrested again in 2013 at the Charles De Gaulle Airport in Paris during a layover from the United States to Turin, and was made to serve the remainder of his prison sentence until 2017.

Tavano, D'Onorio, and Finotto each got five years in prison.

== Insurance fraud ==
Notarbartolo claimed in an interview with Wired magazine that a diamond merchant hired them for the heist. He claims that they actually stole approximately €18 million ($20 million) worth of loot, and that the robbery was part of an insurance fraud. Someone knowing the incumbent robbery could have taken the diamonds and then claimed the insurance on them, hence gaining from the insurance fraud. However, the credibility of Notarbartolo's story has been questioned, as the vault itself had been denied an insurance policy due to several security flaws, which would have made insurance fraud impractical or impossible. Due to this and other pieces of evidence, experts do not consider Notarbartolo's account plausible.

== Legacy ==
The Antwerp diamond heist is the subject of the nonfiction book Flawless: Inside the Largest Diamond Heist in History by Scott Andrew Selby and Greg Campbell. On 8 August 2025, Netflix released Stolen: Heist of the Century, a documentary based on the book, produced by Amblin Entertainment and Raw TV.

The first episode of the Audible Original Audio Series HEIST with Michael Caine gives an overview of the theft, largely taken from the book.

The story of this diamond heist was featured on The Travel Channel's Mysteries At The Museum Season 16, Episode 4 titled "Project Vortex, Diamond Heist and Tinseltown, NJ", narrated by series host Don Wildman.

The story was also featured on TV Series History's Greatest Heists, Season 1, Episode 1: titled "The Antwerp Diamond Heist", narrated by Pierce Brosnan.

Paramount Pictures optioned the rights to create a film about the heist, which have since expired. It was to be produced by J. J. Abrams.

BBC World Service podcast The Outlook produced an audio episode, The detective and the diamond heist, describing the incident and aftermath.

Amazon released Everybody Loves Diamonds, an Italian scripted series based on the Antwerp Diamond Center heist on 13 October 2023, starring Kim Rossi Stuart.

In an interview with Screen Rant, film director Christian Gudegast said his film Den of Thieves 2: Pantera is based on the 2003 Antwerp diamond heist.

== See also ==
- 1971 Baker Street robbery
- 1977 Krugersdorp bank robbery
- 2005 Schiphol Airport diamond heist
- 2013 Brussels Airport diamond heist
- 2015 Hatton Garden safe deposit burglary
