= Guanche mummies of Necochea =

Two Guanche mummies returned from Argentina to Tenerife

- Died: Approximately 9th century CE
- Resting place: Museo de la Naturaleza y la Arqueología, Santa Cruz de Tenerife
- Era: Guanche period
- Known for: Return from Argentina to Tenerife in 2003

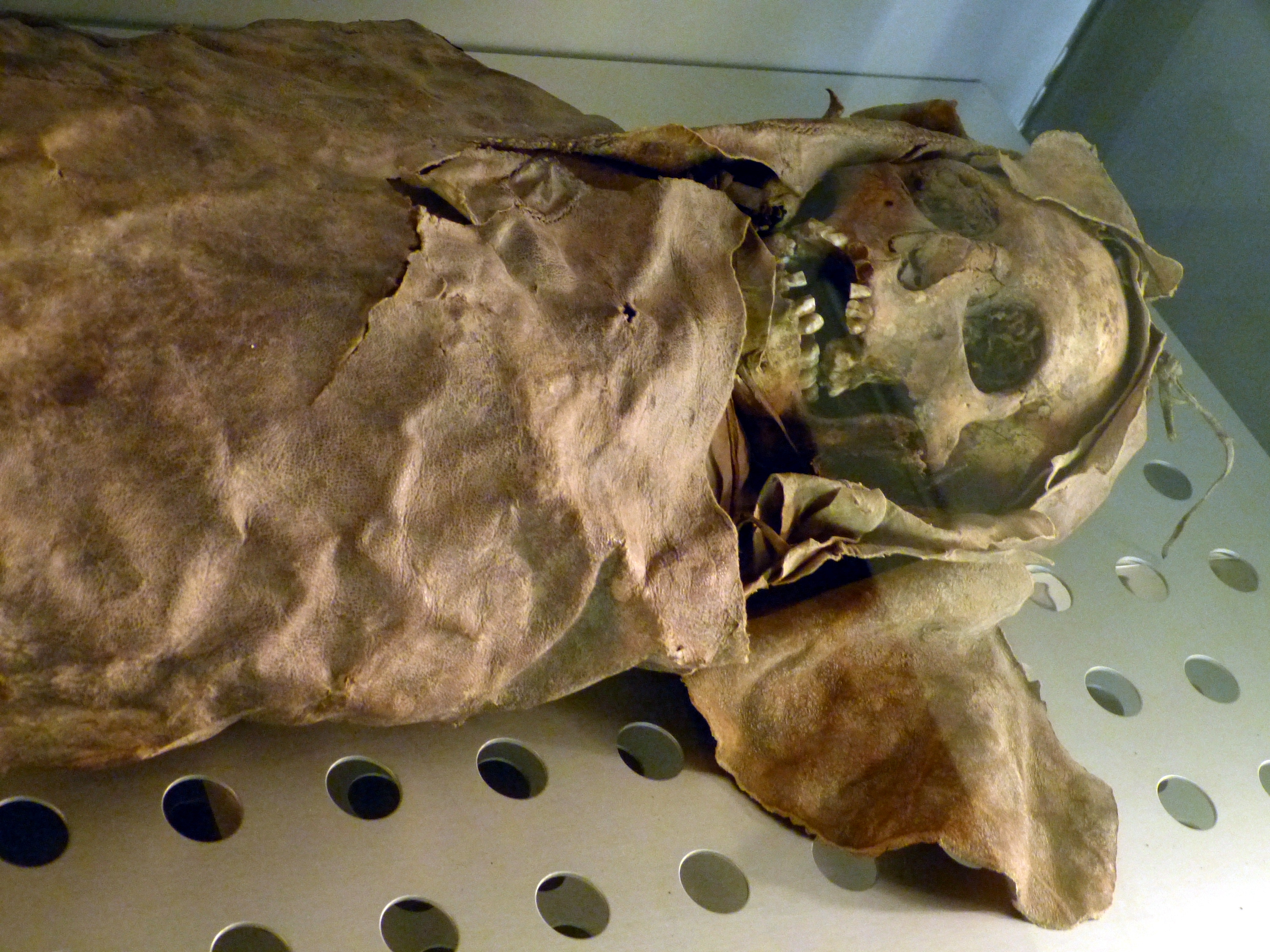
One of the two Guanche mummies of Necochea at the Museum of Nature and Man of Santa Cruz de Tenerife.

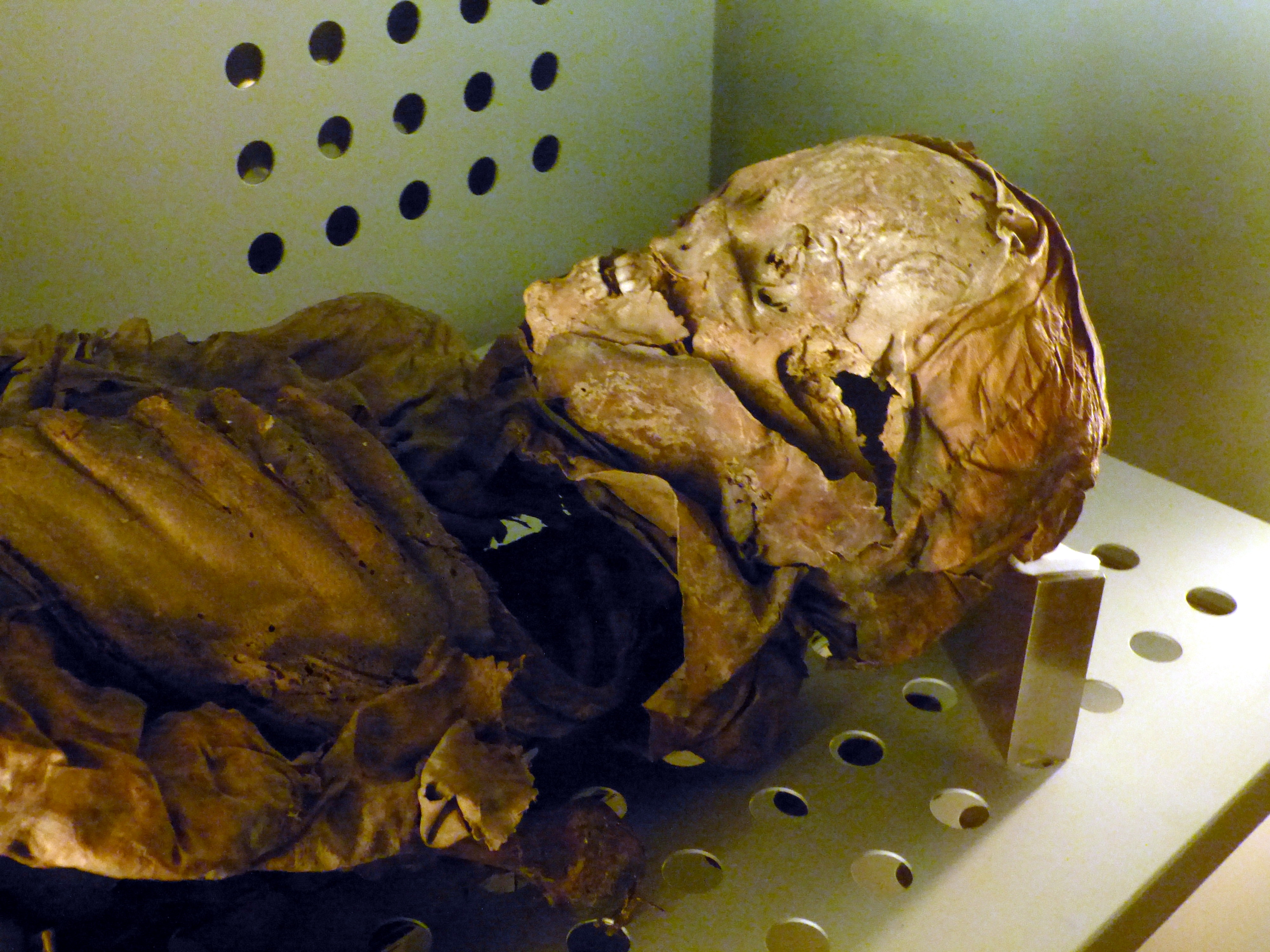
Face of male mummy.

The Guanche mummies of Necochea are two mummies of Guanche individuals, who were the ancient Berber autochthones of the Canary Islands. The specimens are currently on display at the Museo de la Naturaleza y el Hombre in Santa Cruz de Tenerife.

The Necochea mummies are so-called because they were first exhibited in 2003 at the Museo Civil de Ciencias Naturales in Necochea, Province of Buenos Aires, Argentina.

These two individuals, male and female, respectively, the woman would be between 20 and 24 years old and be wrapped in a bundle of pigskin. The other mummy is a man between 25 and 29 years old and has a special feature, its position with legs bent with his heels against his buttocks. According to experts, the mummies date back to the ninth century.

The exact place on the island where the mummies come from is not known. It is believed that one of the mummies may even come from a burial cave in the Barranco de Guayonje in Tacoronte and the other mummy of La Orotava, but according to others could come from Barranco de Herques in Güímar. They were part of the collection of a private museum in Tacoronte. In the nineteenth century it was sold to the La Plata Museum in Argentina, reaching the hands of an unidentified collector. They were later transferred to the city of Necochea, until, in 2003, were returned to Tenerife. This was the first return of mummified human remains from the Americas to Europe in the history of archeology.

== Identity and dating ==
The Necochea mummies are the remains of a young woman and a young man from the Guanche population of Tenerife, the largest of the Canary Islands. The woman is estimated to have died between the ages of 20 and 24, while the man is estimated to have died between the ages of 25 and 29. Researchers have dated the mummies to approximately the ninth century CE.

The original burial places of the two individuals are uncertain. Based on historical records and collection histories, researchers have suggested that one individual may have originated from a burial cave in the Barranco de Guayonje, a ravine on Tenerife's northern coast near Tacoronte, while the other may have come from La Orotava in northwestern Tenerife. Other researchers have proposed that the mummies originated from the Barranco de Herques, a ravine on Tenerife's southeastern coast near Güímar.

== Clothing and associated items ==
In a 2005 study, archaeologist Mercedes del Arco Aguilar and her colleagues examined the materials wrapped around the two mummies. They labelled the woman NEC-1 and the man NEC-2.

The woman’s body was enclosed in several layers of leather made from pieces of different shapes and sizes. The pieces were sewn together with animal tendons and secured with strips of hide. The researchers also identified one binding made from plant material. Museum records describe her as wrapped in a pigskin covering. Researchers found that parts of her body and its covering had been rearranged for museum display.

The man was wrapped in several layers of leather from herbivorous animals. Pieces of leather were joined using different sewing techniques, and bindings secured the covering around his head, body and limbs. The researchers found that the wrappings and bindings had been applied before his body was bent into its final position, with his heels against his buttocks.

Marks on the leather show where additional bindings once lay. One surviving strip passed around the big toe of his left foot and secured the next three toes, leaving the little toe free. Del Arco Aguilar and her colleagues reported that this method of binding the toes had not previously been documented in a Guanche mummy. In their examination, they found no evidence that the man’s mummy had been reconstructed for museum display in the way the woman’s had.

== Exhibition and restitution ==
The two Guanche mummies were removed from Tenerife during the late nineteenth century and remained in Argentina for more than a century. During that time they passed through several museum and private collections before eventually becoming part of the holdings of the Museo Civil de Ciencias Naturales in Necochea.

In 1995, researchers identified the mummies in Necochea and renewed efforts to secure their return. Negotiations involving researchers, museum officials, and government representatives in Argentina and Spain continued for several years before a final agreement was reached in 2003. The mummies arrived in Tenerife on 3 September 2003, more than one hundred years after their removal from the island.

Research carried out after their return found that both mummies had been altered while in museum collections. Portions of the displayed bodies had been reconstructed using remains from other individuals, and modern materials had been incorporated into the specimens. Earlier examinations conducted while the mummies were in Argentina interpreted wires visible within one specimen as evidence of advanced surgical procedures. Later study showed that the wires were actually part of a modern museum reconstruction. Researchers interpreted these modifications as examples of earlier museum practices intended to create more complete display specimens.

Today, the mummies are housed at the Museum of Nature and Man in Santa Cruz de Tenerife.

== See also ==
- Guanche mummy of Madrid
- Mummy of San Andrés
- Museo de la Naturaleza y el Hombre
