= Guanche mummy of Madrid =

Mummified Guanche man from 12th- or 13th-century Tenerife

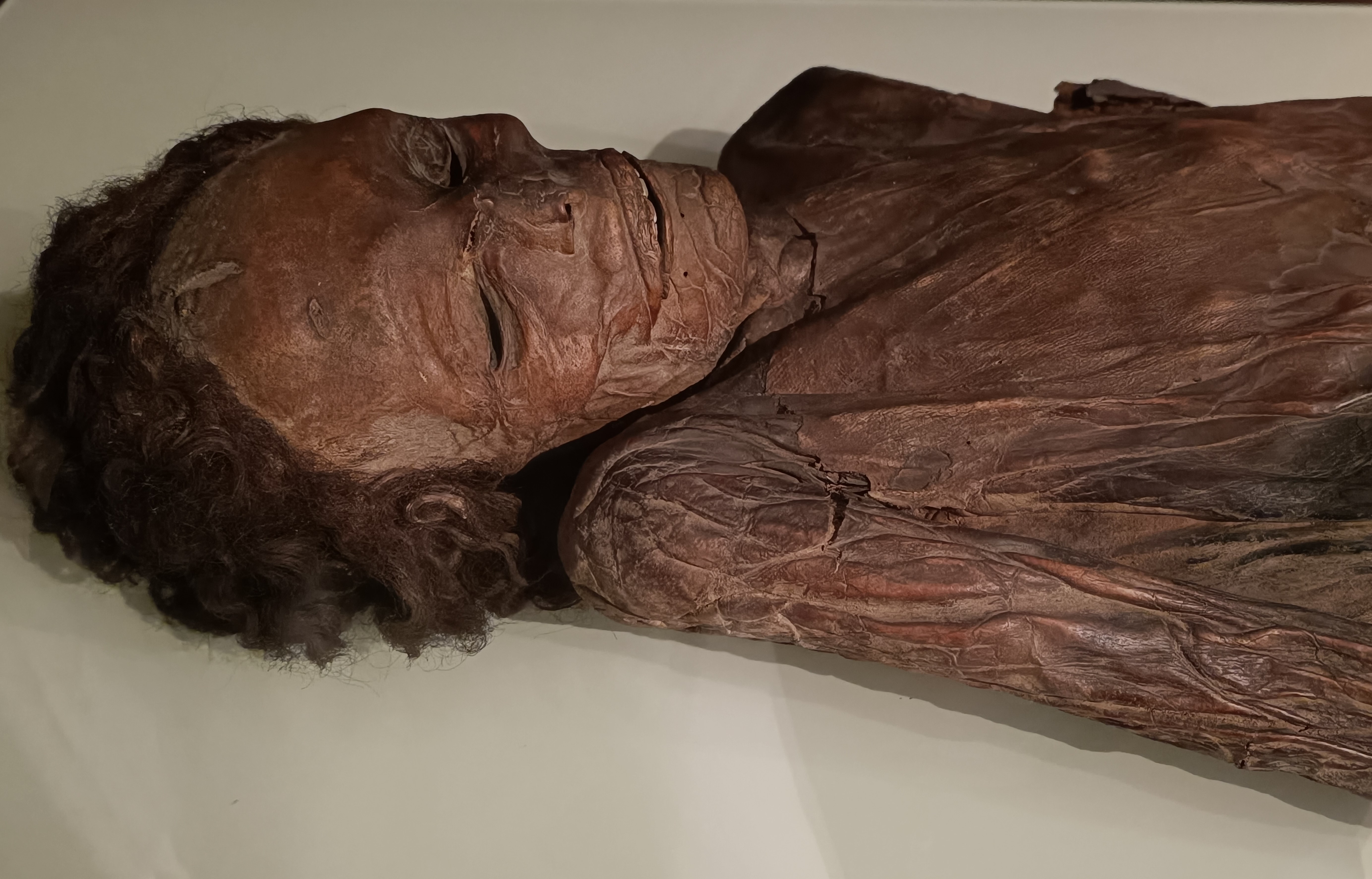
- The Guanche mummy of Madrid at the National Archaeological Museum
- Died: 12th or 13th century CE (aged 35–40)
- Body discovered: 1763 or 1764; Barranco de Herques, Tenerife
- Resting place: National Archaeological Museum, Madrid
- Era: Guanche period
- Known for: Its exceptionally well-preserved remains
- Height: 1.62 m (5 ft 4 in)

The Guanche mummy of Madrid, also known as the Guanche mummy of Barranco de Herques, is the mummy of a Guanche man who lived on Tenerife, Canary Islands, during the 12th or 13th century CE. He was between 35 and 40 years old at the time of death and is regarded as one of the best-preserved examples of Guanche mummification. Computed tomography (CT) examination has revealed preserved internal soft tissues, including portions of the brain, and found no evidence that the internal organs were removed during mummification.

The mummy was discovered in a burial cave in the Barranco de Herques, on southeastern Tenerife, and transported to Madrid in 1764, where it entered the collections of King Charles III. After more than 250 years in Spanish collections, it was removed from public display at the National Archaeological Museum in 2025 as part of a policy against displaying human remains. The government of the Canary Islands has repeatedly requested that the mummy be returned to Tenerife.

== Identity and dating ==
The man who came to be known as the Guanche mummy of Madrid was a member of the Guanches, the Indigenous people of the Canary Islands, who lived on the island of Tenerife during the 12th and 13th centuries CE. A radiocarbon dating study conducted by the National Archaeological Museum in 2018 determined that he lived more than 800 years ago.

Studies estimate that he was between 35 and 40 years old at the time of death and stood approximately 1.62 metres (5 ft 4 in) tall. He was buried in a cave in the Barranco de Herques, a ravine on the southeastern coast of Tenerife that was historically used as a Guanche burial area.

The individual is regarded as one of the best-preserved examples of Guanche mummification known.

== Discovery ==
The Guanche mummy of Madrid was discovered in a burial cave in the Barranco de Herques, a ravine on the southeastern coast of Tenerife between the present-day municipalities of Fasnia and Güímar. Historical accounts indicate that the cave formed part of a large Guanche funerary complex. According to the historian and biologist José de Viera y Clavijo, the site contained "no less than a thousand mummies".

The mummy was recovered from the cave in 1763 or 1764, more than five centuries after the man's death. In July 1764, the remains were transported from Tenerife in the Canary Islands to Madrid, approximately 1,800 kilometres (1,100 mi) away, where they entered royal collections and were subsequently transferred among several Spanish museums.

== Condition and preservation ==
The Guanche mummy of Madrid is one of the best-preserved examples of Guanche mummification known. Much of the body's soft tissue has survived, allowing researchers to examine both its external appearance and internal anatomy using computed tomography (CT) scans.

CT examination revealed the preservation of portions of the brain and other internal soft tissues. The study found no evidence that the body's viscera had been removed during mummification, a finding that differs from some historical accounts describing the evisceration of Guanche dead as part of the embalming process.

The mummy retains a complete permanent dentition with little evidence of disease or significant wear. Its state of preservation has allowed researchers to create detailed three-dimensional reconstructions and conduct non-invasive examinations of the body.

== Exhibition and return requests ==
The Guanche mummy of Madrid has been displayed in Spanish institutions for more than 250 years. After arriving in Madrid in the 18th century as a gift to King Charles III of Spain, it was housed in the Royal Library before being transferred to the National Anthropology Museum in Madrid. The mummy was also exhibited at the Universal Exhibition of Paris in 1878, bringing it to an international audience.

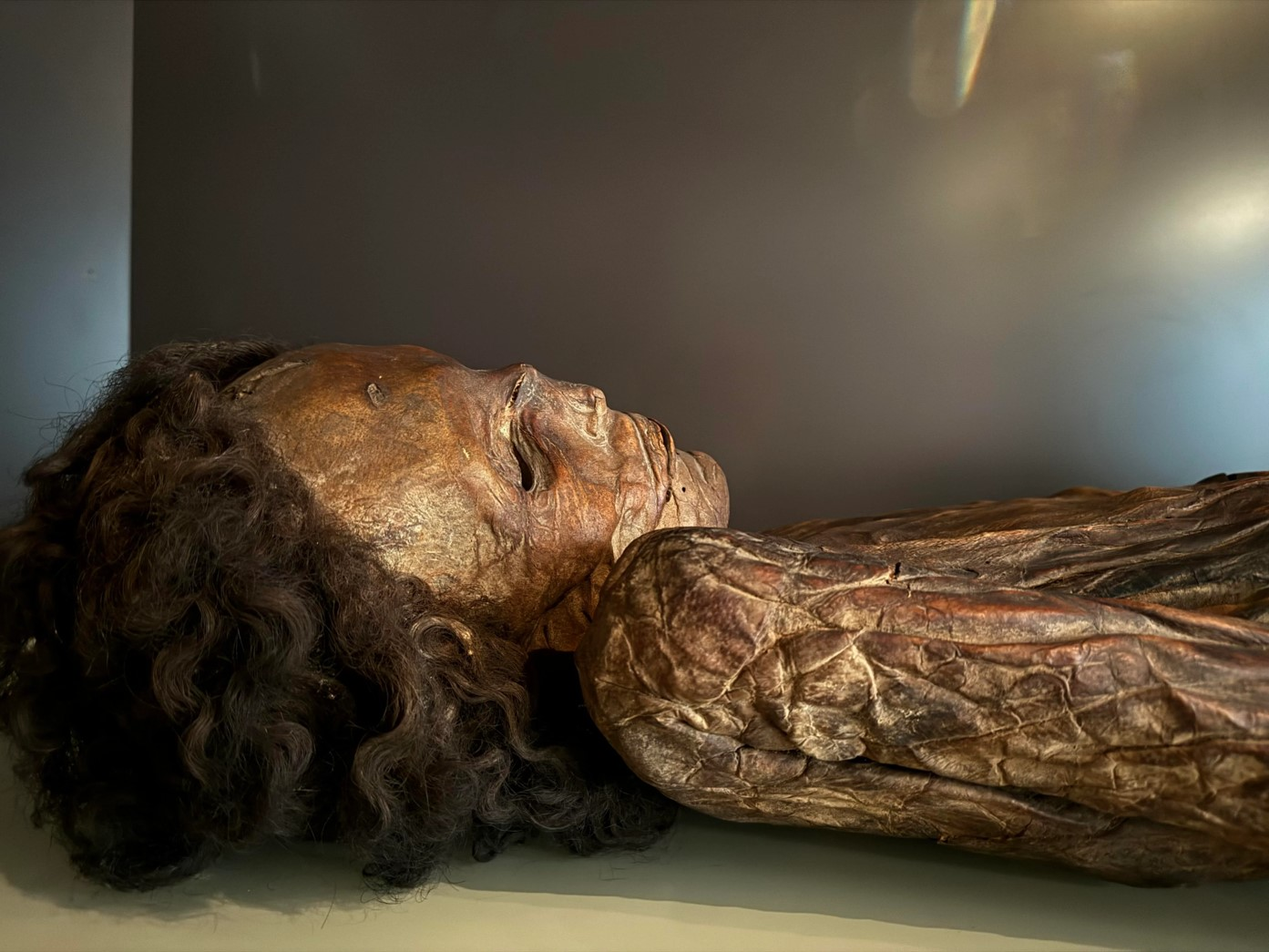
Photograph of the Guanche mummy from the Archaeological Museum in Spain

In December 2015, the mummy was transferred to the National Archaeological Museum in Madrid, where it remained on public display for nearly a decade as part of an exhibition on the pre-Hispanic history of the Canary Islands.

The mummy's continued presence in Madrid has been the subject of debate for many years. The government of the Canary Islands has repeatedly requested that the remains be returned to Tenerife, arguing that they form part of the archipelago's cultural heritage. These requests have been rejected on several occasions by the Congress of Deputies, the lower house of the Spanish parliament.

In February 2025, the Spanish Ministry of Culture announced that the mummy would be removed from public display after more than two centuries of exhibition in Spanish collections. The decision formed part of a broader policy against exhibiting human remains in Spain's national museums. Following the announcement, the government of the Canary Islands renewed its request for the mummy to be transferred to Tenerife rather than remain in museum storage in Madrid.

== See also ==
- Guanche mummies of Necochea
- National Archaeological Museum of Spain
