= Barranco de Badajoz =

Coordinates: 28°18′10″N 16°26′40″W

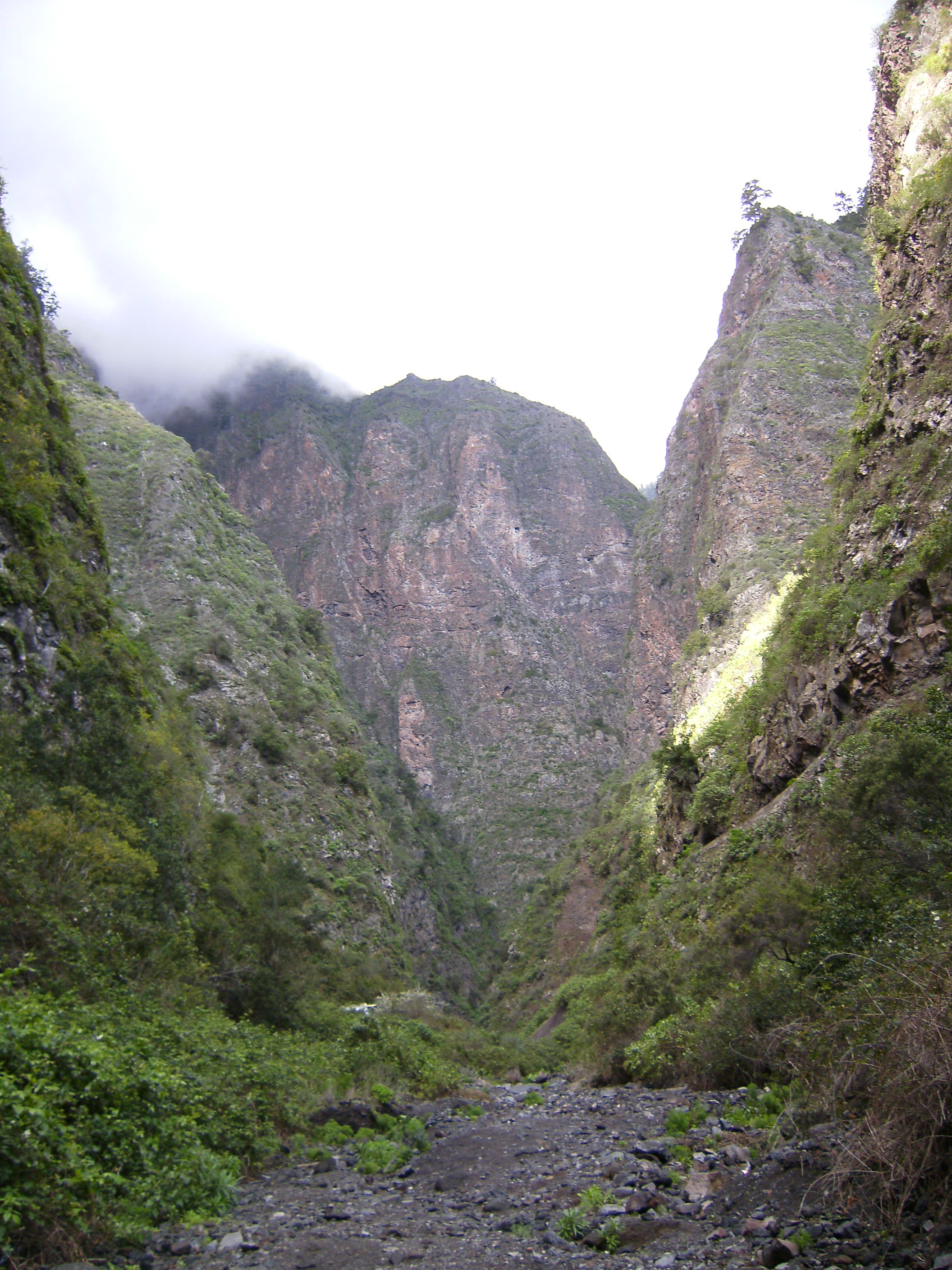
Barranco de Badajoz

The Barranco de Badajoz or Chamoco is a ravine on the island of Tenerife (Canary Islands, Spain), in the province of Santa Cruz de Tenerife, part of the municipality of Güímar in the southeast of the island.

== Archeology ==
The most significant prehistoric remains on the island were found in this area, demonstrating the aboriginal guanche activity. In addition, several Guanche mummies have been found here, so the place is important archaeologically.

== Legends ==
There are many legends about experiences people have had who have visited and stayed mainly at night in the Barranco de Badajoz. Many people claim to have seen apparitions of angelic beings and to have experienced various paranormal phenomena, ranging from UFO's to poltergeists and orbs, balls of fire, appearances of the legendary Tibicena, ritual satanic and other spectral phenomena.

But the most famous and well-known story associated with this place is that of the Niña de las Peras (Pear Girl), who disappeared into the ravine, reappearing decades later with the same appearance she had on the day she disappeared.

The area has been described as similar to the Bridgewater Triangle (Massachusetts) in the United States.
