= Stone of the Guanches =

- Taganana
- Location: Afur, Tenerife, Canary Islands
- Type: Guanche stele

The Stone of the Guanches, also known as Stone of Taganana, is an engraved stone stele located in the village of Afur (near Taganana), on the island of Tenerife, Canary Islands, Spain. It is made of red tuff volcanic rock.

== Characteristics ==
This archaeological site consists of a structure formed by a stone block featuring large rock carvings on its surface, elevated on three more smaller rocks. The assembly has a similar appearance to a table. This monolithic block is associated with mummification practices of aboriginal Guanches (the mirlado). For this reason the stone is also called Mirlado stone or stone of the Dead. This is a unique element in the context of the Canarian prehistory.

The Guanche Stone is located on the littoral outdoor area in the ravine of Afur. They are engraved on the stone rows of bowls arranged vertically. It also highlights the presence of a representation of the Carthaginian goddess Tanit, represented by a bottle-shaped symbol surrounded by cruciform motifs. The general outline of the monument reminds the form of stelae, such as the runestones. For this reason, it is thought that originally was an altar of sacrifice linked to those found in the Semitic field and then reused for the ritual of mummification.

== See also ==
- List of individual rocks
- Cave of Achbinico
- Cave of Chinguaro
- Church of the Guanche People
- Zanata Stone
