= Zanata Stone =

Engraved stone found in 1992

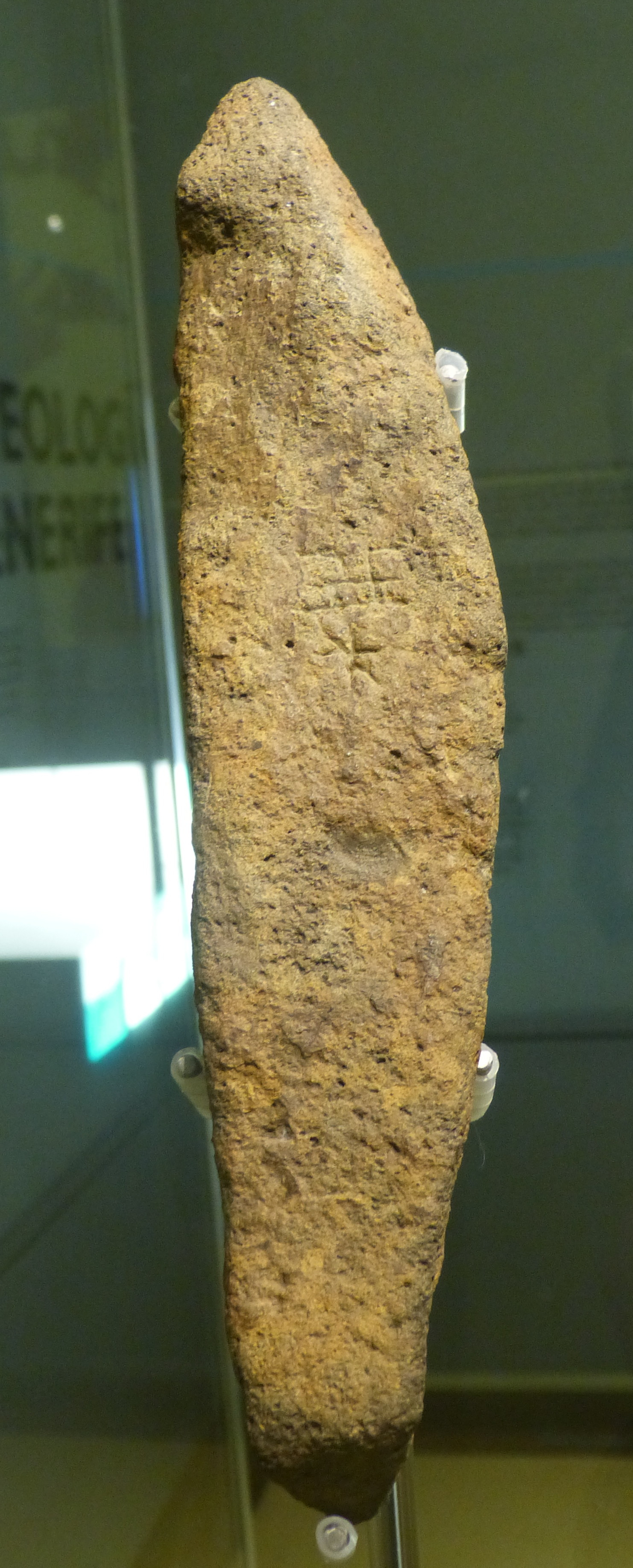
- The Zanata Stone
- Interactive map of Zanata Stone
- Location: Archaeological Museum of Tenerife (Tenerife, Canary Islands)
- Type: Guanche Tifinagh stele
- Dedicated to: Guanche Berber religion

The Zanata Stone (Spanish: Piedra Zanata), also known as the Zenata Stone, is a small engraved stone. The tablet is purported to be of Guanche origin. It was found in 1992 near a mountain known as Montaña de las Flores (Mountain of the Flowers) in the municipality of El Tanque, located in the northwestern part of Tenerife, Canary Islands.

The Zanata Stone is considered to depict a kind of fish. According to Rafael Gonzalez Antón, the director of the Archaeological Museum of Tenerife, its characters appear to be in Tifinagh. The latter alphabet is descended from the ancient Libyco-Berber script, and is used today by the Tuareg. It is currently in the Archaeological Museum of Tenerife (Santa Cruz de Tenerife).

According to Dr. Renata Springer Bunk and doctoral student Irma Mora Aguiar, it is a forgery.

== See also ==
- List of individual rocks
- Cave of Achbinico
- Church of the Guanche People
- Guanche mummies
- Royal Mausoleum of Mauretania
- Stone of the Guanches
