= Niña de las Peras =

The Niña de las Peras (in English: Pear Girl) is one of the most popular Canarian legends, and although it has undergone many transformations over time, its basic premise has remained the same.

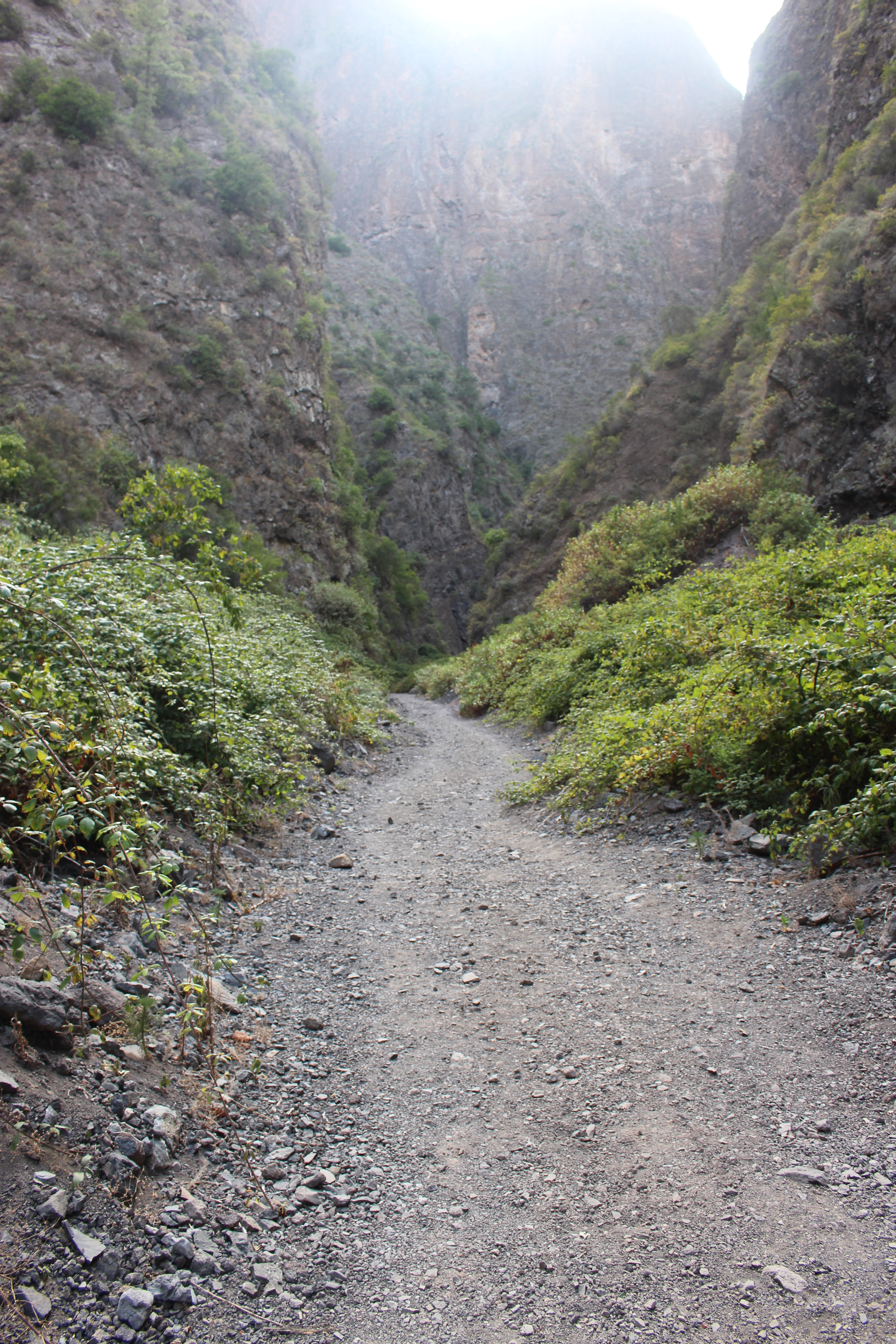
Barranco de Badajoz, place where the events take place.

This legend is believed to have originated between the late 19th and early 20th centuries, specifically between 1890 and 1910. The story takes place in the town of Güímar on the island of Tenerife, where parents sent their young daughter to the nearby barranco de Badajoz to look for fruit, but the girl disappeared.

A frantic search by the local residents began, but to no avail. After a while, the girl was considered unrecoverable, and the neighbors returned to their daily routines. Several decades later, the girl knocked on the door of her parents' house, looking the same as the day she disappeared. Her parents, who had already grown old, could not hide their surprise and amazement at what had happened.

The girl told her parents what had happened: after reaching the ravine, exhausted, she had fallen asleep at the foot of a pear tree, until a very tall being dressed in white woke her. This being asked the girl to accompany him into a cave, and she followed his instructions, as he inspired her confidence. They descended into the cave, where they found a garden inhabited by more beings like the one who had guided her there. The girl started a conversation with them, but the being who had led her there led her back to the cave exit and said goodbye to her. The girl believed that only a short period of time had passed, but in reality, twenty or forty years had passed, depending on the source.

== See also ==
- Lists of people who disappeared
- Hollow Earth
