= Pyramids of Güímar =

19th-century structures on the Canary Islands, Spain

Coordinates: 28°19′15″N 16°24′49″W

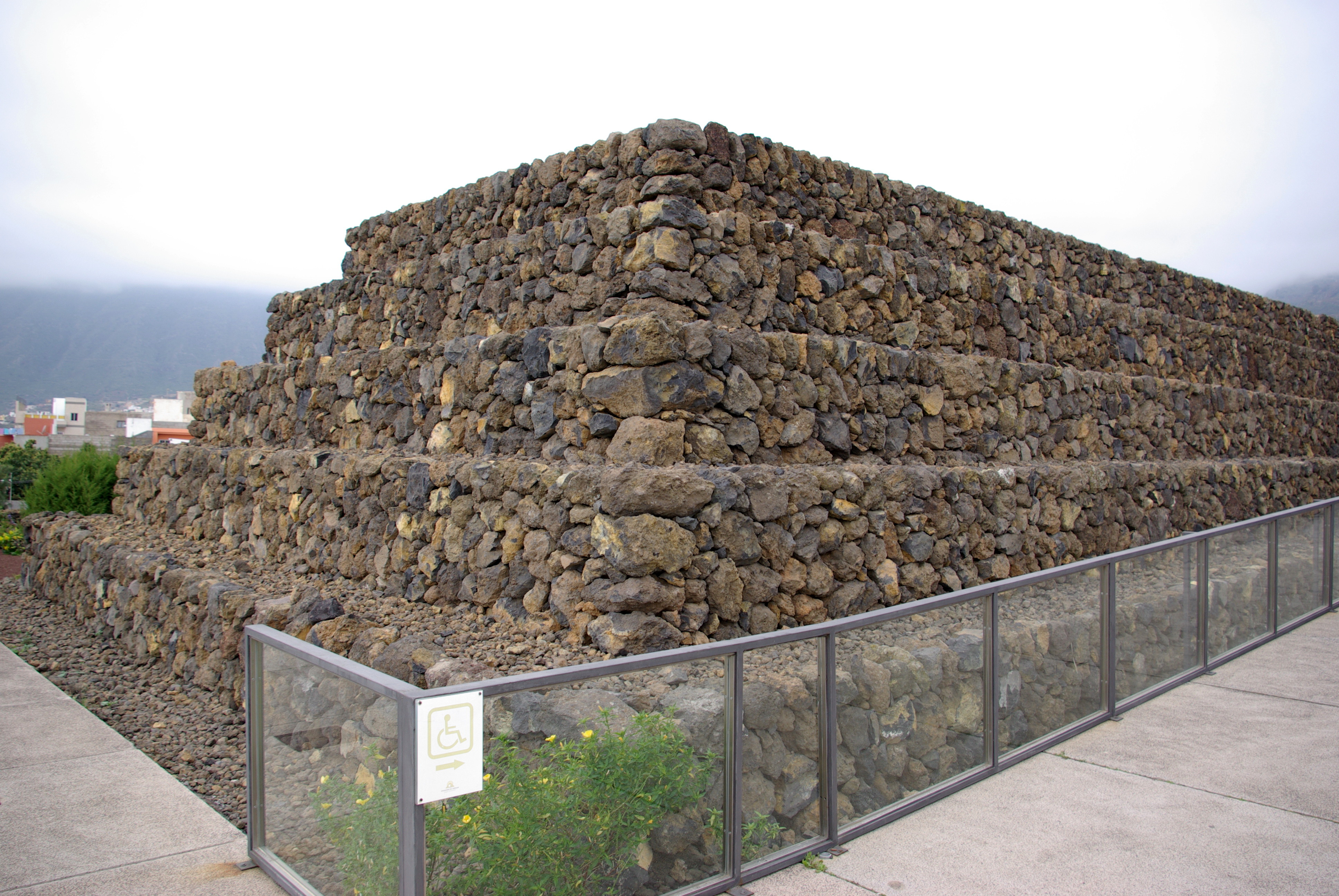

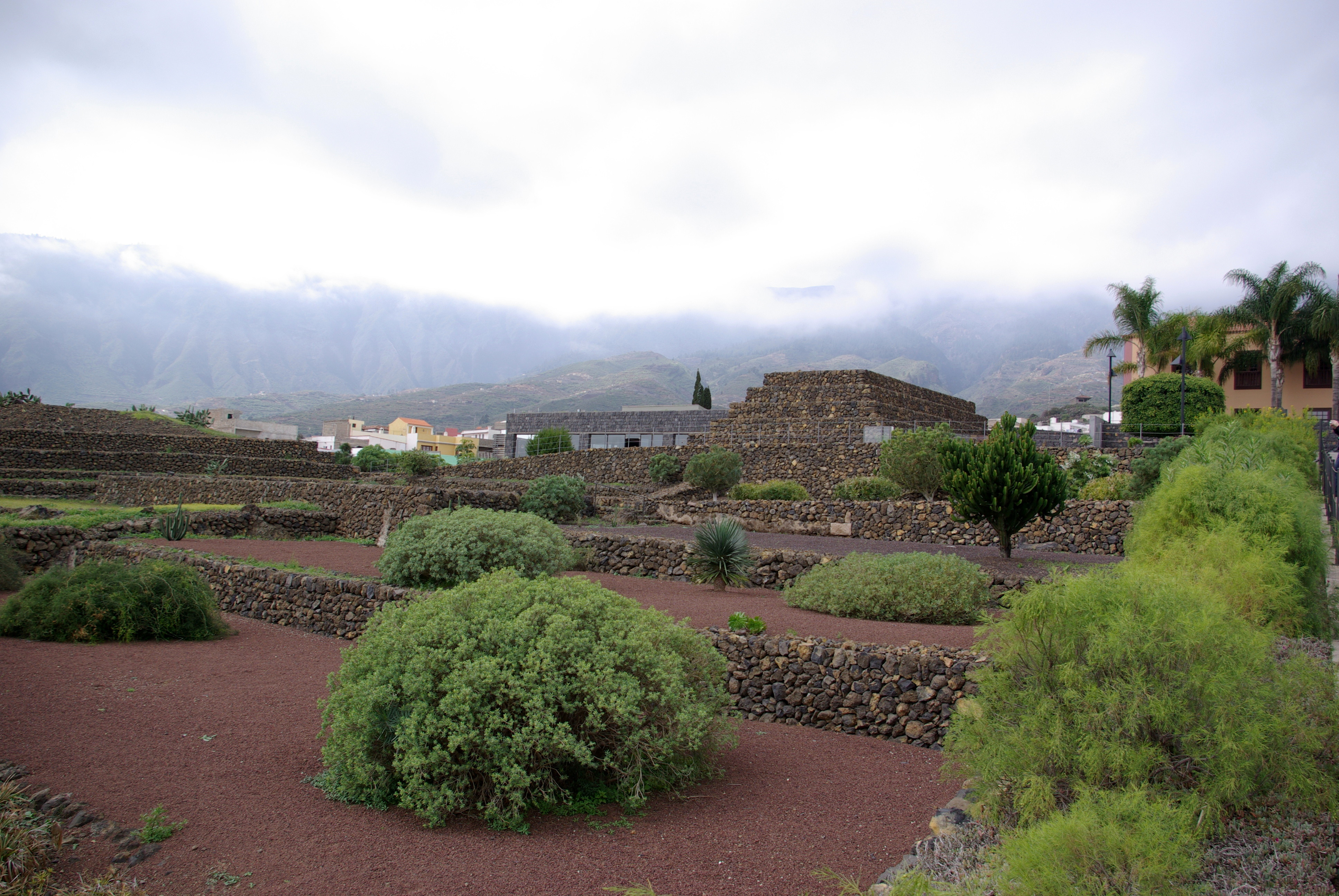

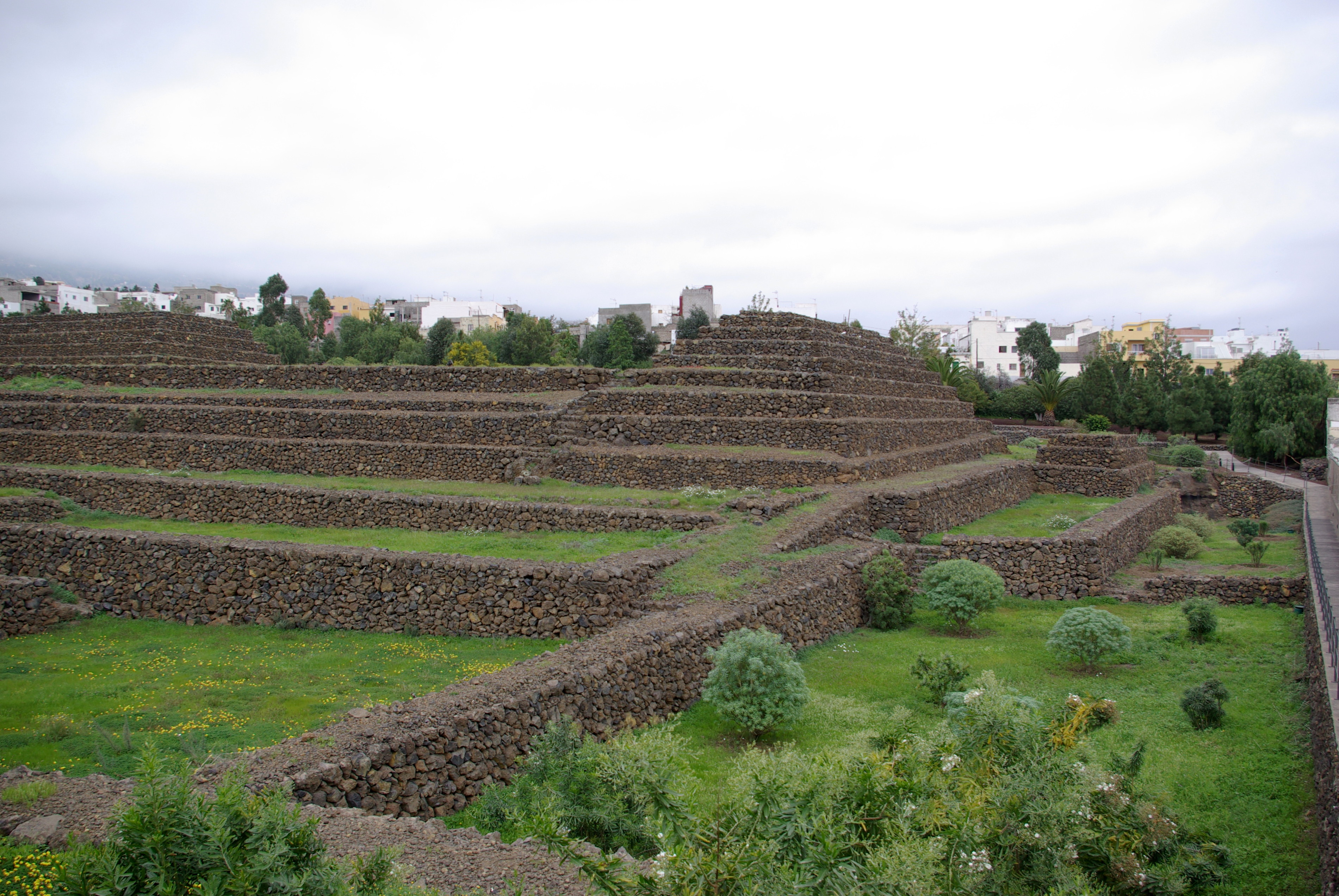

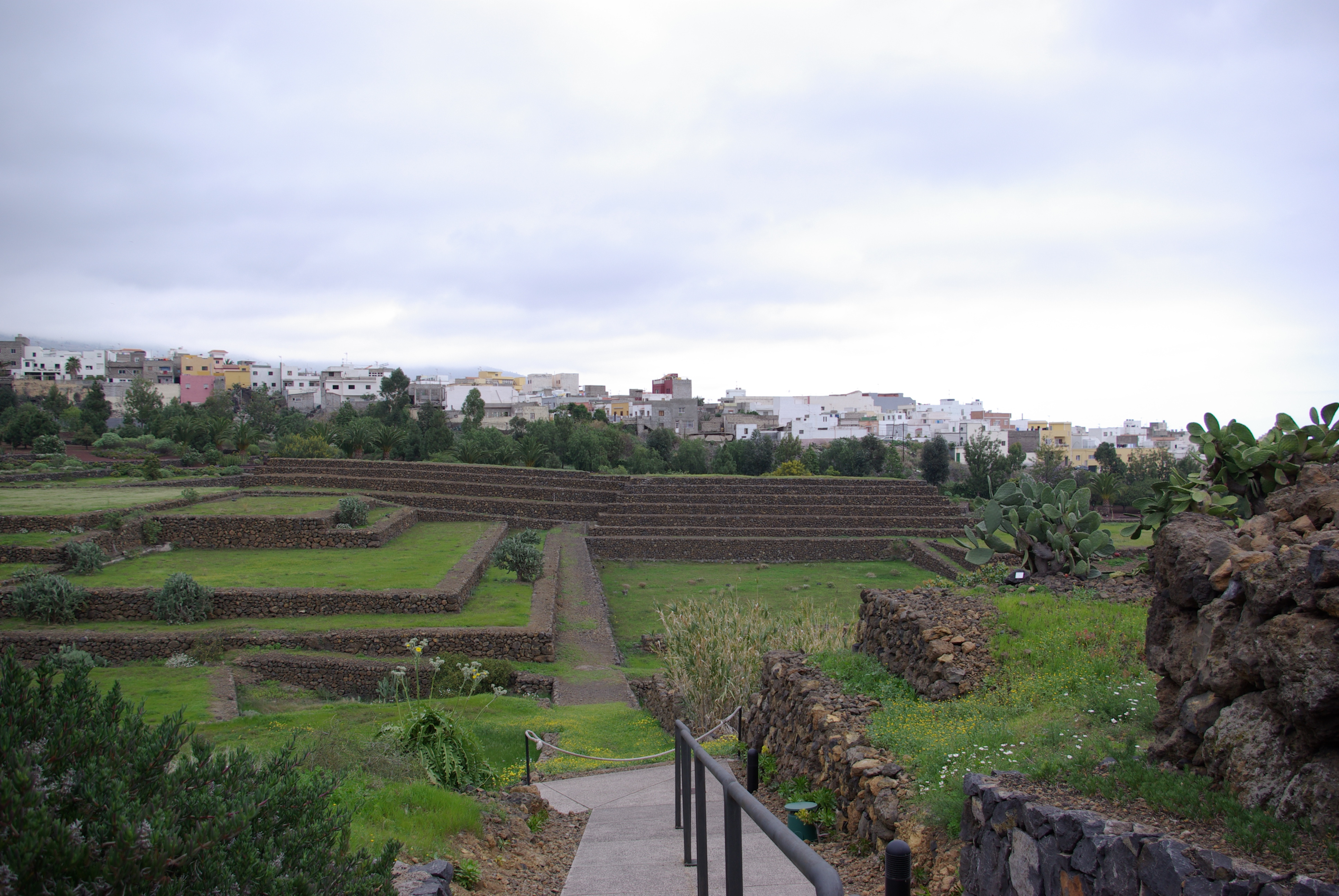

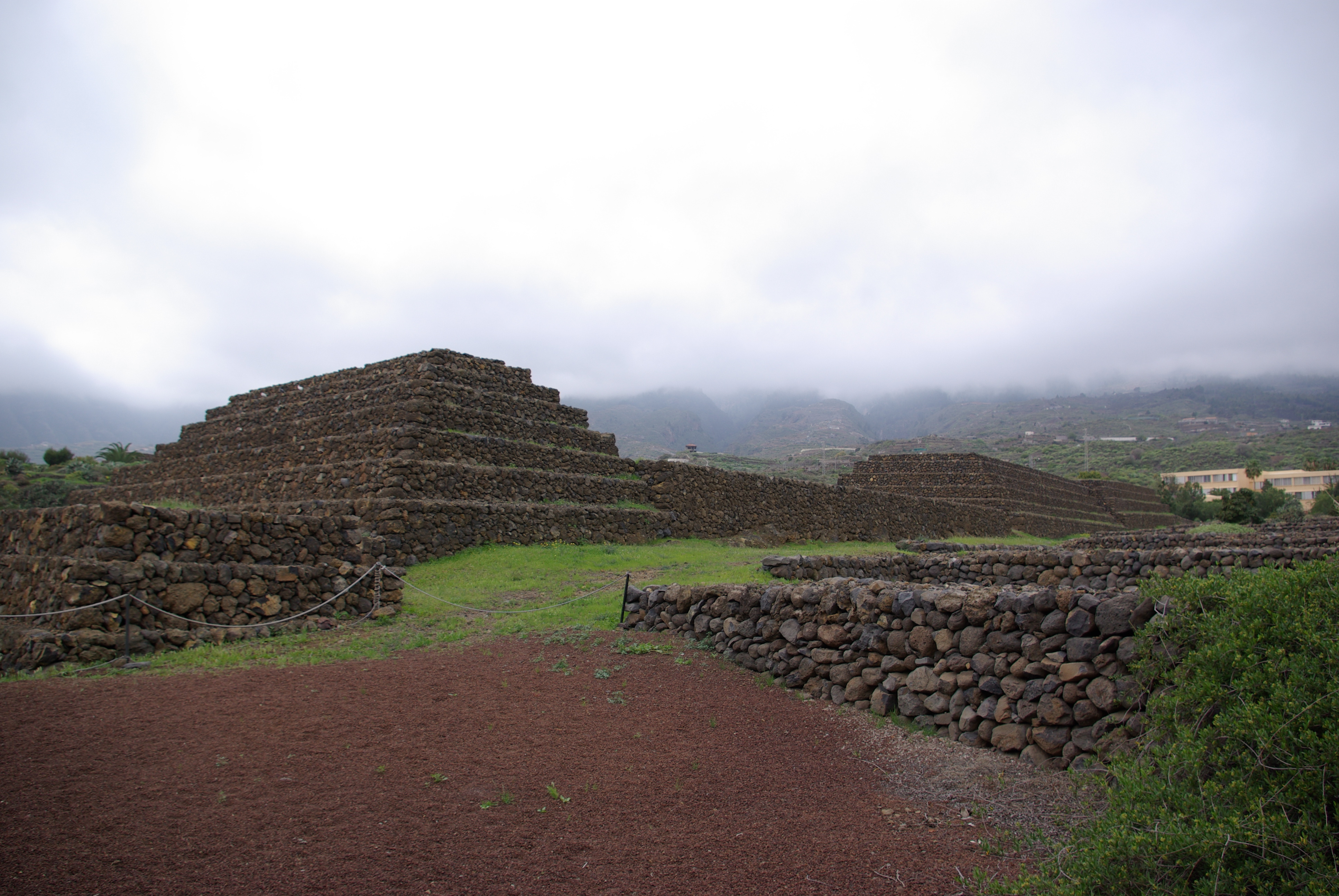

The Pyramids of Güímar are six rectangular pyramid-shaped, terraced structures built from lava stone without the use of mortar. They are located in the district of Chacona, part of the town of Güímar on the island of Tenerife in the Canary Islands, Spain. The structures have been dated to the 19th century AD and were built as part of the lucrative exploitation of cochineal. These pyramids stand as high as 12m.

Other pyramids employing the same methods and materials of construction can be found in various sites on Tenerife. In Güímar itself there were nine pyramids, only six of which survive.

== Popularity ==
The 1990s saw a number of local newspaper articles and research papers as well as the creation of an ethnographic park. The park was created by Thor Heyerdahl and claims that the structures are step pyramids.

In 1990 Heyerdahl, became aware of the "Canarian Pyramids" by reading an article written by Francisco Padrón in the Tenerife newspaper "Diario de Avisos" detailing "real pyramids on the Canaries". As Heyerdahl had hypothesized a transatlantic link between Egypt and Central America, he became intrigued by the Güímar pyramids and relocated to Tenerife. Heyerdahl hypothesised that the Canarian pyramids formed a temporal and geographic stopping point on voyages between ancient Egypt and the Maya civilization, initiating a controversy in which historians, esoterics, archaeologists, astronomers, and those with a general interest in history took part.

=== Astronomical research ===
In 1991, research by Juan Antonio Belmonte Avilés, Antonio Aparicio Juan and César Esteban López, researchers of the Canary Institute of Astrophysics, shown that the long sides of some of the terrace structures at Güímar marked the direction of both solstices. The main limiting wall points to the sunset in the Summer solstice and the pyramids have stairs on their western side which face the direction of the rising sun on the Winter solstice. Also, standing on the platform of the largest pyramid on the day of the Summer solstice it is possible to experience a double sunset, as first the sun sets behind a mountain top, then it emerges again from behind the mountain and sets a second time behind a neighbouring peak. However, considering the room for interpretation, it is impossible based solely on these observations to conclude what was the intention of the builders or the building date.

In 2005, a book was published in Spanish by Aparicio and Esteban titled The Pyramids of Güímar: Myth and Reality. Aparicio and Esteban suggest that the solstitial orientations of the pyramids were potentially motivated by the Masonic symbolism. These authors argue that solstices are very important in the symbolism of Freemasonry, and that the owner of the land in the epoch in which the pyramids were built was himself a Freemason. This motivation would be only an aesthetic one and would not modify in any rate the fundamental motivation (agriculture) and date of construction.

=== Archaeological excavations ===
Between 1991 and 1998, with the agreement of Thor Heyerdahl, multiple excavations of the site by archaeologists of the University of La Laguna (Departamento de Prehistoria, Antropología e Historia Antigua) took place. In 1996 the results of the 1991 excavation were presented at a colloquium (published in 1998), providing evidence for the dating of the pyramids. According to the preceding geophysical Georadar-Survey eight locations adjacent to the pyramids, each with an area of 25 m², were investigated in layers down to the solid lava-floor. In doing so it was possible to establish three specific sediment layers. Starting from the top these were:

1. A layer of thickness averaging 20 cm, consisting of humus-rich earth with many plant remains and roots; tracks from ploughing were clearly identifiable as were a broad spectrum of readily datable finds from the second half of the 20th century.
2. A layer of thickness averaging 25 cm, similar in composition to the first layer, however containing less humus and a larger amount of small stones; a large variety of finds which could be dated to the 19th and 20th century were found, of which an official seal from 1848 deserves particular mention.
3. A layer of thickness between 25 and 150 cm, composed out of small volcanic rocks, most likely put in place in one movement, which levelled the uneven stone underneath; the stones contained only very few finds, mostly a small number of pottery shards, of which some was local and some imported, both kinds were roughly estimated as belonging to the 19th century; the pyramids stand stratigraphically directly on top of this bottom layer, therefore allowing only for an earliest date of construction of the pyramids within the 19th century.

Furthermore, under the border edge of one of the pyramids, a natural lava cave was discovered. It had been walled up and yielded artefacts from the time of the Guanches. Since the pyramids lie stratigraphically above the cave, the Guanche finds from between 600 and 1000 AD can only support conclusions on the date of human use of the cave. The above survey indicates that the pyramids themselves cannot be older than the 19th century.

== Conclusions ==
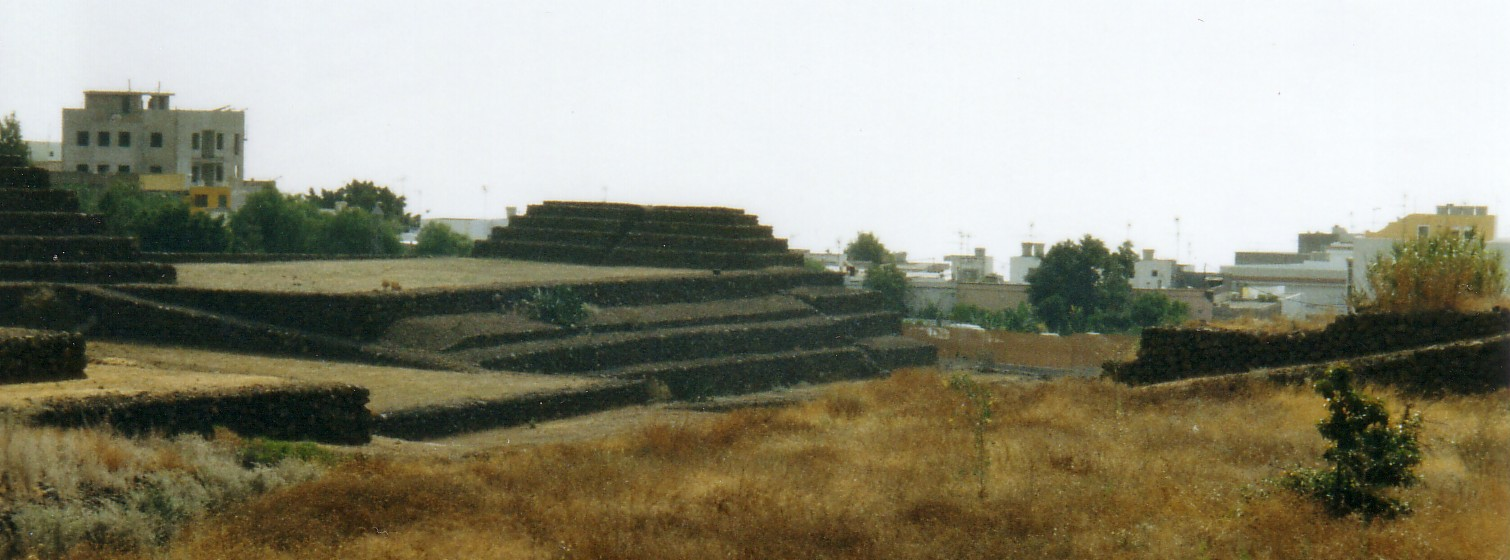
Pyramids of Güímar

The archaeologists involved maintain that the creation of the terrace structures followed from the practices of the 19th century rural population, who created these structures while clearing cultivatable land of stones, as they piled the stones into these terrace shapes.

Heyerdahl suggested that the structures were not haphazardly piled-up stones. Heyerdahl maintained a belief in the hypothesis that the pyramids were connected with Guanches until his death. The association of the Guanches and the pyramids continues to be elaborated upon both in "Pyramid park" and on its official website.

Aparicio and Esteban's theory connects the facts that the pyramids were built in the 19th century with the acknowledgement that they are not simply piles of stones.

== Ethnographic park ==
Following the completion of the excavations in 1998, the 65,000 m² area surrounding the pyramids was made accessible to the public. Heyerdahl received financial support from his friend the Canarian businessman Fred Olsen, who owns the largest transport company in the Canaries and whose family came to the islands from Norway in the 20th century. An information centre provides visitors with information about Heyerdahl’s research trips and his previous ideas regarding the pyramids. Two pavilions contain exhibits relating to Heyerdahl along with models of his boats; a replica of the Ra II in its original size, amongst others. In spite of the conclusions regarding the age of the pyramids outlined above, Heyerdahl continued to maintain a belief "in a possible relationship between the existence of the pyramids and the pre Hispanic civilisation on Tenerife". The objects found in the Guanche cave are shown in the "museum" in heavily enlarged photos, whilst the imported ceramics from the 19th century are mentioned only briefly on an information board – without illustration.
