= Mummy of San Andrés =

Guanche mummy

Coordinates: 28.4639°N 16.2494°W

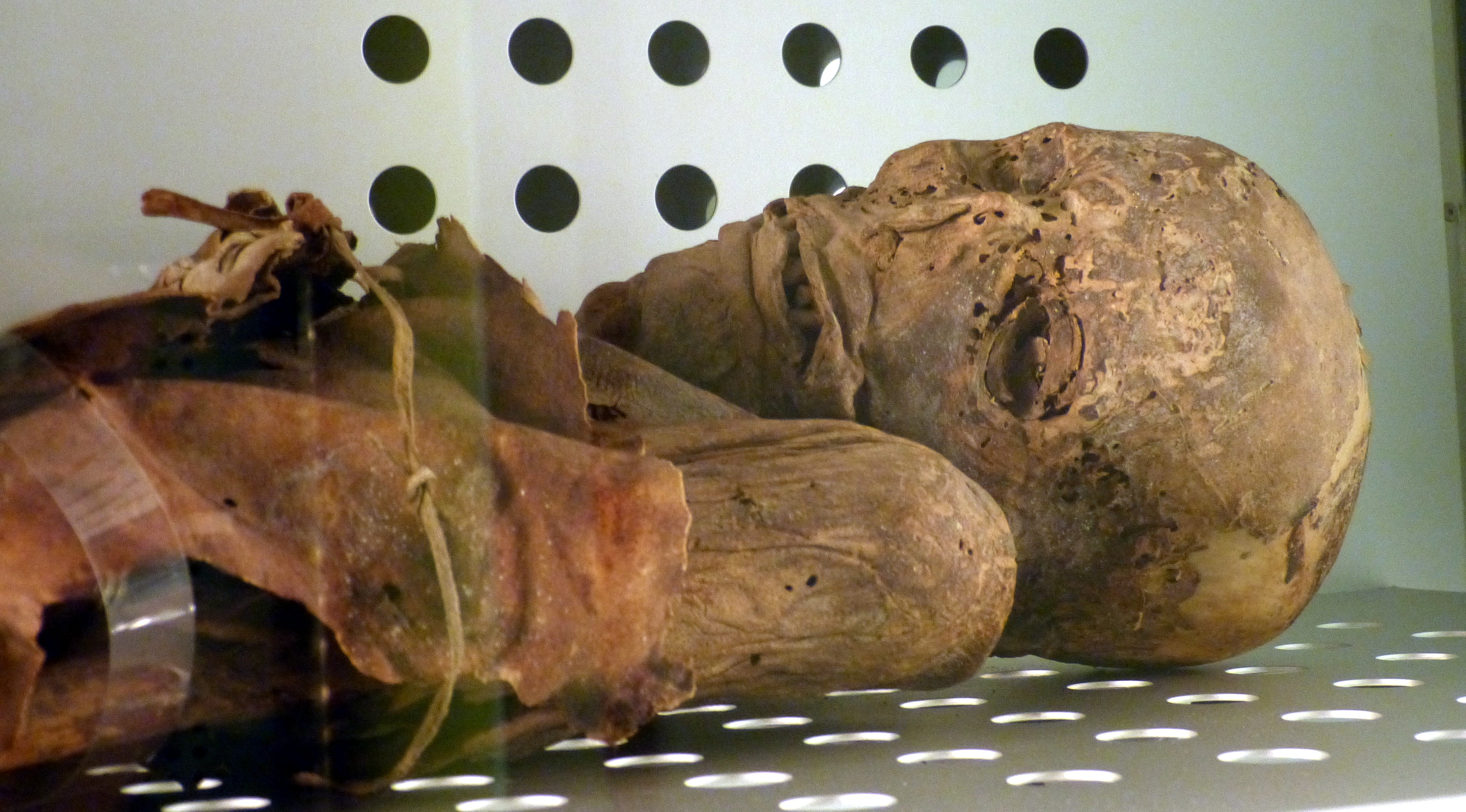
- Upper body of the Mummy of San Andrés
- Body discovered: Burial cave near San Andrés, Anaga, Tenerife
- Resting place: Museo de la Naturaleza y la Arqueología, Santa Cruz de Tenerife
- Era: Guanche period

The Mummy of San Andrés is a human mummy belonging to the Guanche culture, who were the ancient inhabitants of the Canary Islands, Spain.

It is one of the best preserved Guanche mummies, and is one of the few that has a proper name, Mummy of San Andrés.

== Name and etymology ==
The individual who became known as the Mummy of San Andrés takes his modern name from the village of San Andrés in the Anaga region of northeastern Tenerife, where he was discovered in a burial cave. No historical Guanche name for the individual is known, and the designation is a modern archaeological convention.

Like a number of well-known archaeological human remains, including Tollund Man, Grauballe Man and Lindow Man, he is identified by the place in which he was found rather than by a personal name. The designation "Mummy of San Andrés" distinguishes the individual from other preserved Guanche mummies held in museum collections.

== Discovery ==
The Mummy of San Andrés was found in a cave in a ravine outside San Andrés, a village in northeastern Tenerife in Spain's Canary Islands. The village lies on the southern slopes of the Anaga mountains, an area with numerous archaeological sites and caves used for burial. The exact year of his discovery is unknown.

Little is recorded about how he was found. The mummy belonged to an early archaeological collection held by the Gabinete Científico, a scientific society in Santa Cruz de Tenerife, the island's capital. In a study published in 2008, archaeologist María del Carmen del Arco Aguilar and her colleagues reported that no documentation describing his original burial place survives.

== Clothing and associated items ==
The man's body is partly covered by a shroud, or burial wrapping, made from goatskin. The skin is sewn with tendons, possibly from sheep or goats, and secured by six narrow strips of skin tied in knots. Animal-skin burial wrappings fastened with leather straps or cords are described in historical accounts of the Guanches, the Indigenous people of Tenerife.

In a study published in 2008, del Arco Aguilar and her colleagues suggested that the wrapping's present shape and size resulted from the mummy's reconstruction in a museum. The wrapping was larger than the body inside it and lacked folds showing that it had fitted around him in a seated position, the burial posture suggested by examination of his pelvis and spine.

No surviving documentation describes the contents of his original burial. The researchers reported that the wooden support and objects later displayed beside him were assembled largely from material belonging to different burials.

== Exhibition ==
The mummy was displayed at the Municipal Museum of Santa Cruz de Tenerife, on the island of Tenerife in Spain's Canary Islands. In 1958, it entered the collection of the Archaeological Museum of Tenerife. It was later included in an international mummy exhibition associated with Proyecto Cronos, a research project that studied Guanche mummies from 1990 to 1992.

The body's appearance changed during its time in museums. An early photograph shows it partly separated, although the head and upper body remained joined. Museum staff later arranged it lying flat and displayed it on a wooden support with objects mostly taken from other burials. In their 2008 study, archaeologist María del Carmen del Arco Aguilar and her colleagues explained that this display does not show how the mummy was originally found. They described it as being kept in a case with controlled temperature and humidity at the Archaeological Museum of Tenerife, now part of the Museo de la Naturaleza y la Arqueología in Santa Cruz de Tenerife.

== Data on the mummy ==
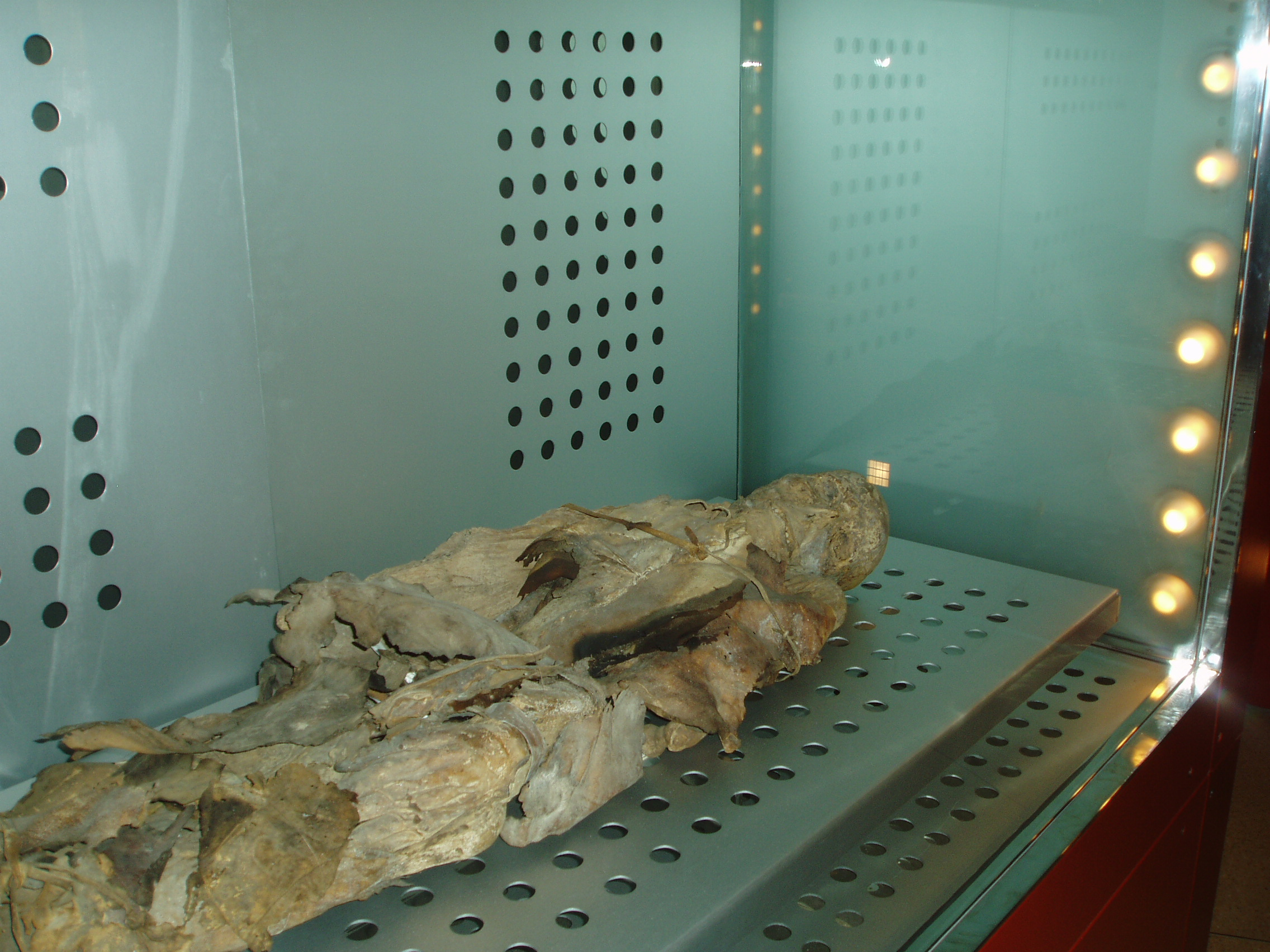
Mummy of San Andrés in Museo de la Naturaleza y el Hombre (Santa Cruz de Tenerife).

- Gender: male.
- Age: 25 to 30 years or so.
- Culture: Guanche.
- Type of mummification: mummy ceremonial.
- Type of burial: burial cave.
- Location: Anaga (Tenerife).
- Shown at: The Museum of Nature and Man (Santa Cruz de Tenerife), along with other Guanche mummies preserved.
- Interesting facts: Found on a wooden board (now this plate not displayed to the public).

== See also ==
- Guanche mummies of Necochea
