= Museo de la Naturaleza y Arqueología =

Museum in Santa Cruz de Tenerife

Coordinates: 28.4639°N 16.2495°W

Museo de la Naturaleza y el Hombre
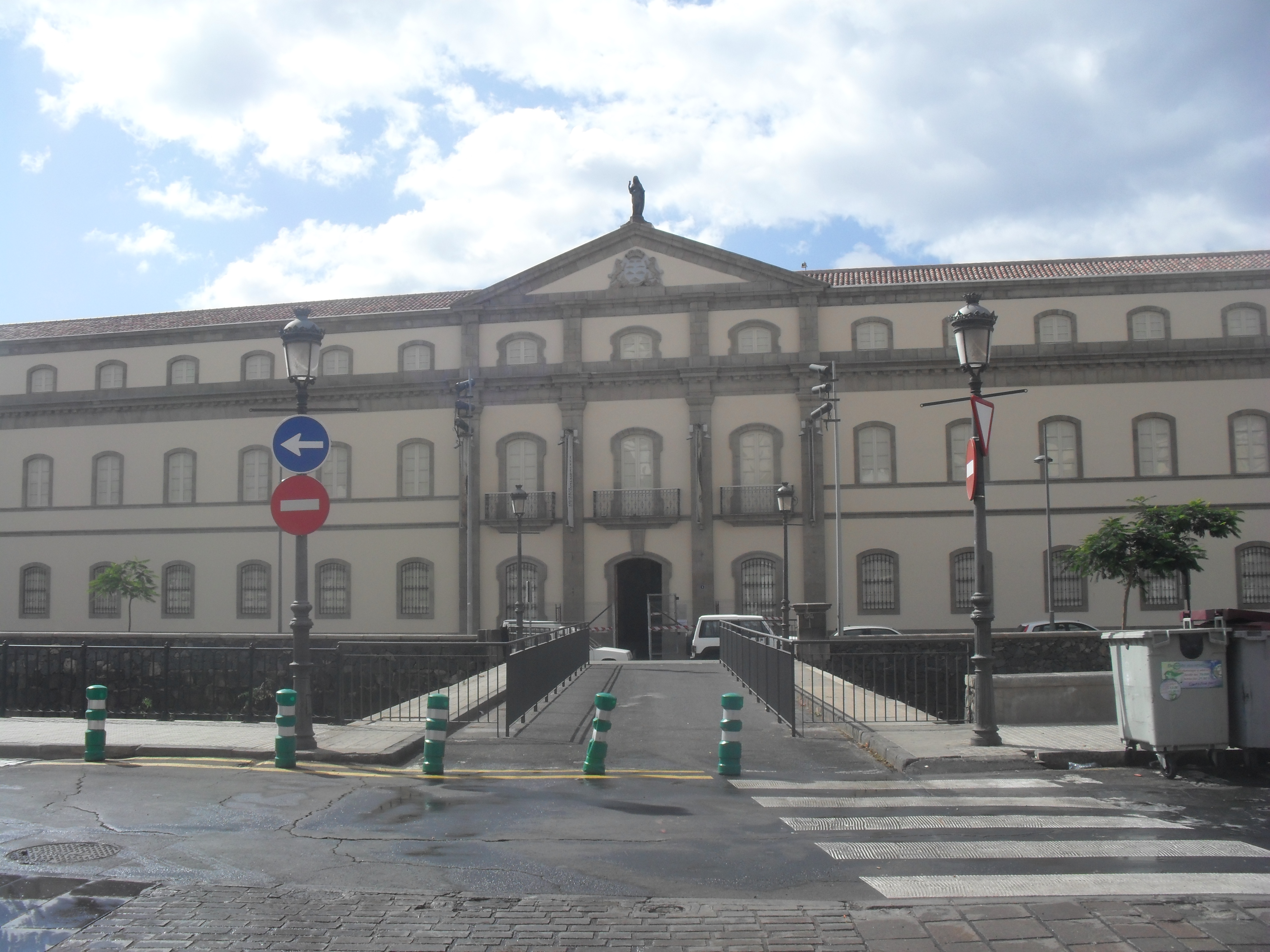
- Established: 1958
- Location: Fuente Morales Street, Santa Cruz de Tenerife, Spain
- Key holdings: Guanche culture items, mummies, Zanata Stone, amphora
- Director: Rafael González Antón
- Public transit access: Station Foundation, Tenerife Tram
- Website: Museo de la Naturaleza y el Hombre

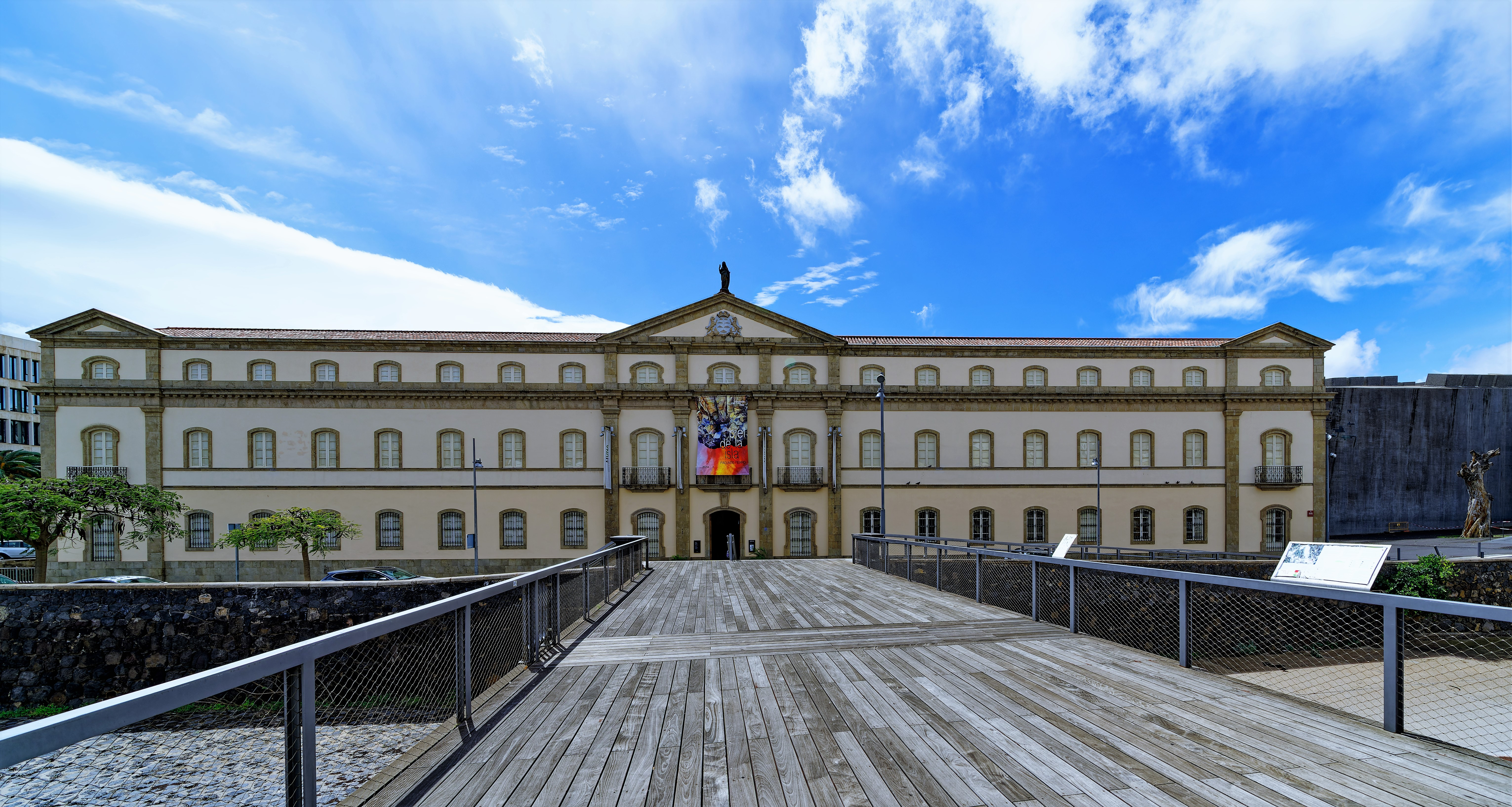

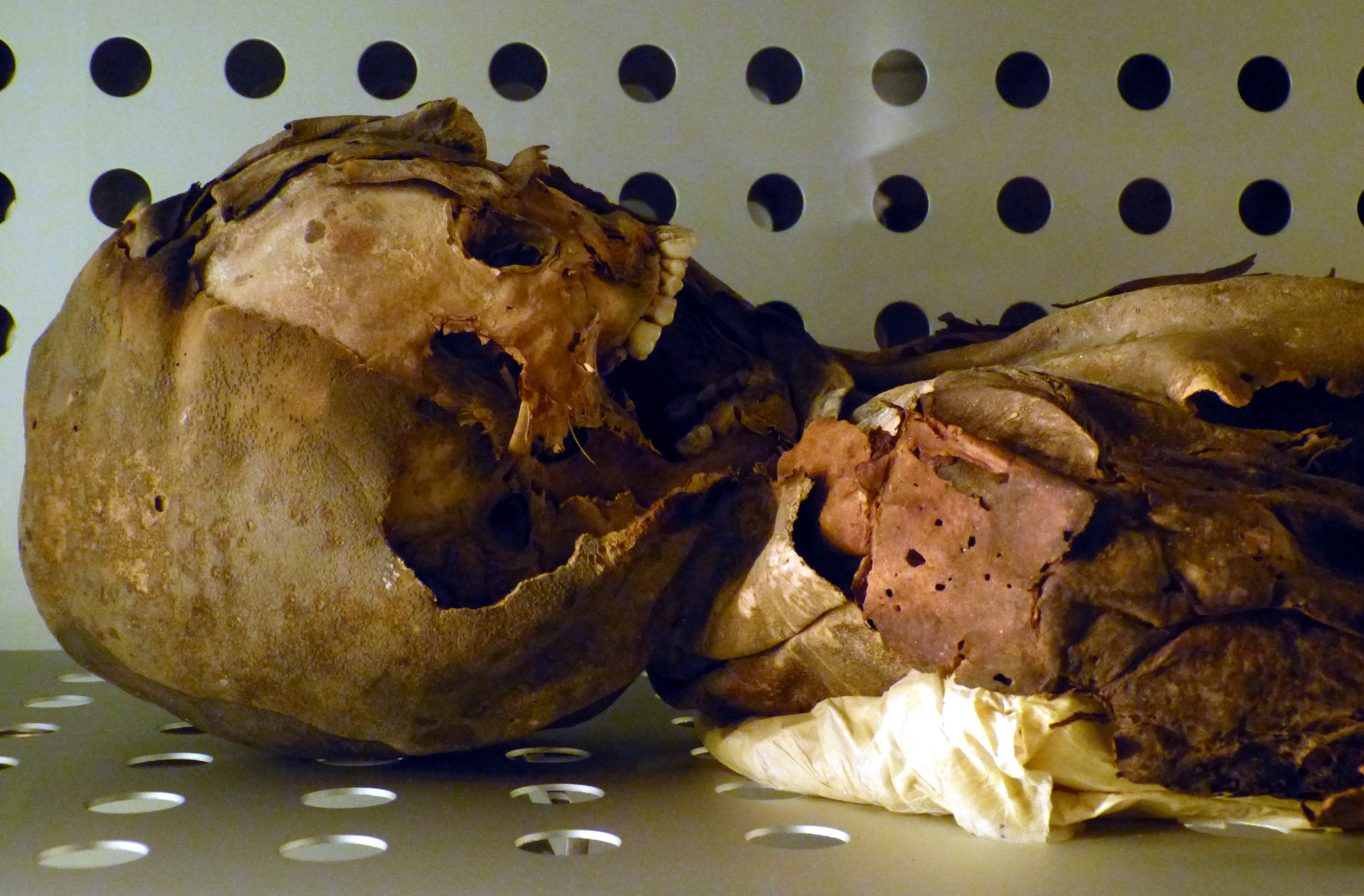
Guanche mummy

Museo de la Naturaleza y Arqueología (MUNA), (English: Museum of Nature and Archaeology, formerly Spanish: Museo de Ciencias Naturales, Spanish: Museo de la Naturaleza y el Hombre) is a museum in Santa Cruz de Tenerife, Tenerife, (Canary Islands, Spain). It contains many significant archaeological finds and is considered the best repository of objects from the Pre-Castilian Canary Islands. The museum also houses significant paleontological, botanical, entomological, and marine and terrestrial vertebrate collections, and is considered the best Natural Library of the Canary Islands.

Museo de la Naturaleza y el Hombre integrates the Archaeological Museum of Tenerife, the Bioantropología's Canary Institute and the Museum of Natural Sciences of Tenerife. The museum is located in the downtown area of Santa Cruz, in the former Civil Hospital, a building that constitutes an example of the neoclassical architecture of Canary Islands. The archaeological section was founded in 1958.

The museum holds the largest collection on the culture of the Guanche and also features a new method of presenting mummies, (announced in 2006 by the Cabildo de Tenerife through a communique). It is also internationally recognized for its meetings on archaeology and collection of Guanche mummies. For these reasons, it is considered one of the most important museums of Macaronesia.

== History ==
Founded in 1958 with funds from the Section of Archaeology and Anthropology Museum of the City of Santa Cruz de Tenerife, its first director was Luis Diego Cuscoy, who brought together a unique collection of archaeological material and human remains from the prehistory of Tenerife. During the sixties, funds were raised to add to the collections, including ethnographic and archaeological materials from Africa and Pre-Columbian America. At present the museum exhibits prehistoric archaeological remains both from Tenerife and the rest of the Canary Islands as well as other cultures.

== Permanent exhibitions ==
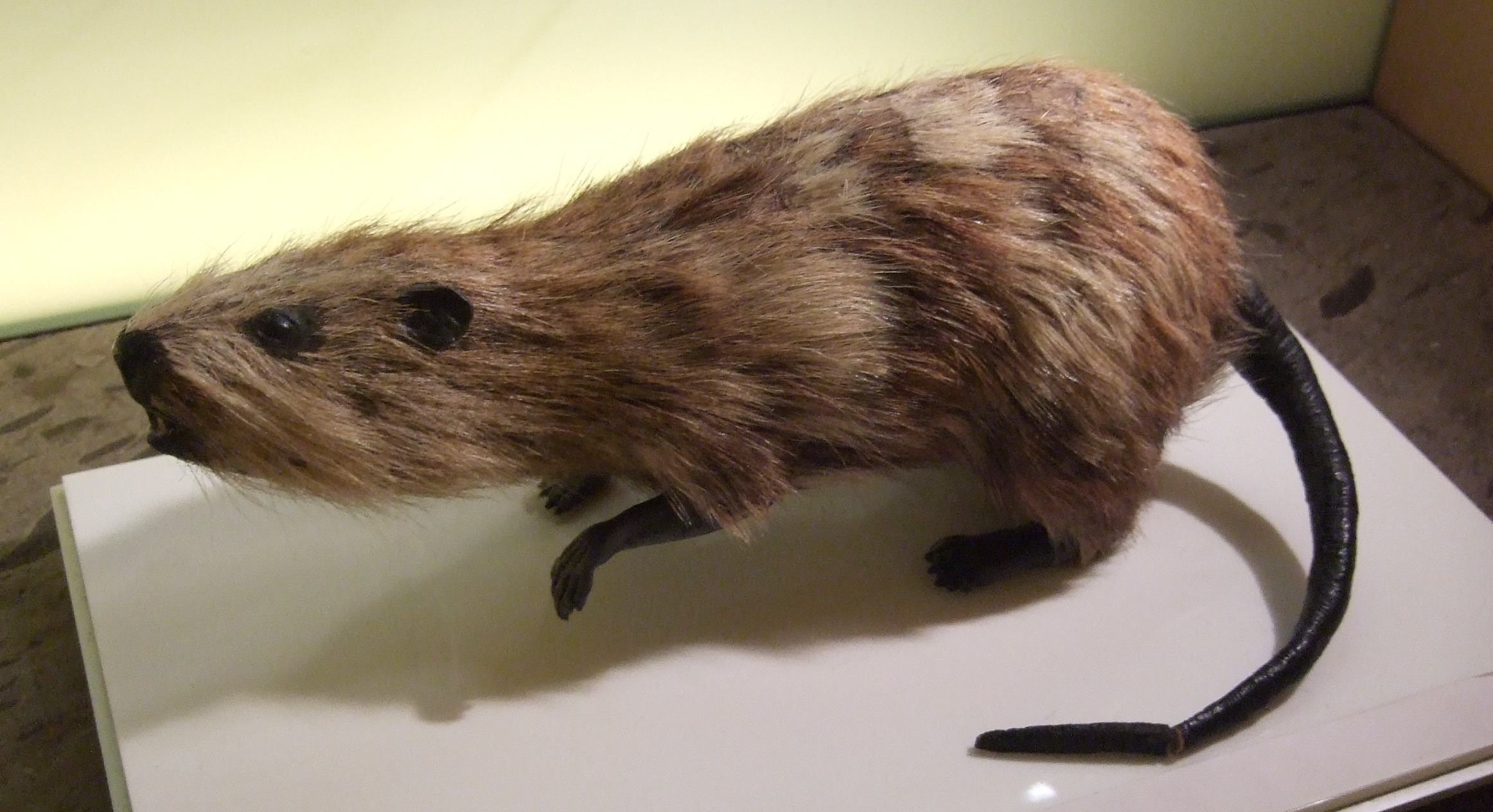
Reconstruction of Tenerife Giant Rat.

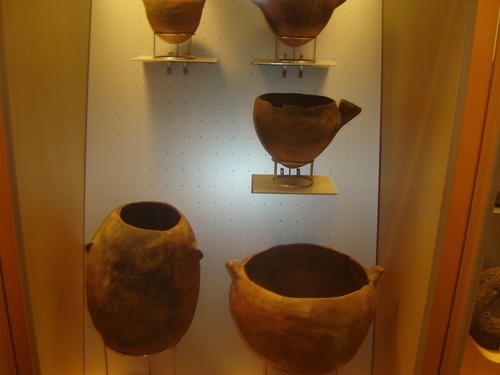
Guanche pottery.

On permanent exhibition is a gallery dedicated to the archaeology and the funeral rituals of the aboriginal world. Displayed are the museums collection of skeletal and mummified remains of the original inhabitants of the Canary Islands, the Guanches, along with objects buried in the royal tombs of their kings, the Menceyes. Among the best preserved mummies are that of the Mummy of San Andrés, as well as the renowned Guanche mummies of Necochea.

The museum also exhibits a fine collection of ceramics and fossils of prehistoric animals both of Canaries and of the rest of the world, such as the giant lizard of Tenerife (Gallotia goliath), the Tenerife Giant Rat (Canariomys bravoi), the Tenerife giant tortoise (Geochelone burchardi), megalodon shark tooth and fossil remains of trilobites, etc.

== Featured items ==
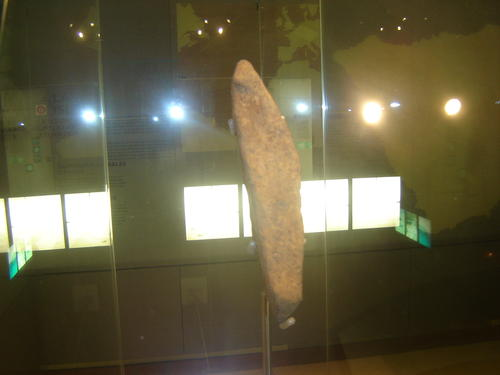
Zanata Stone.

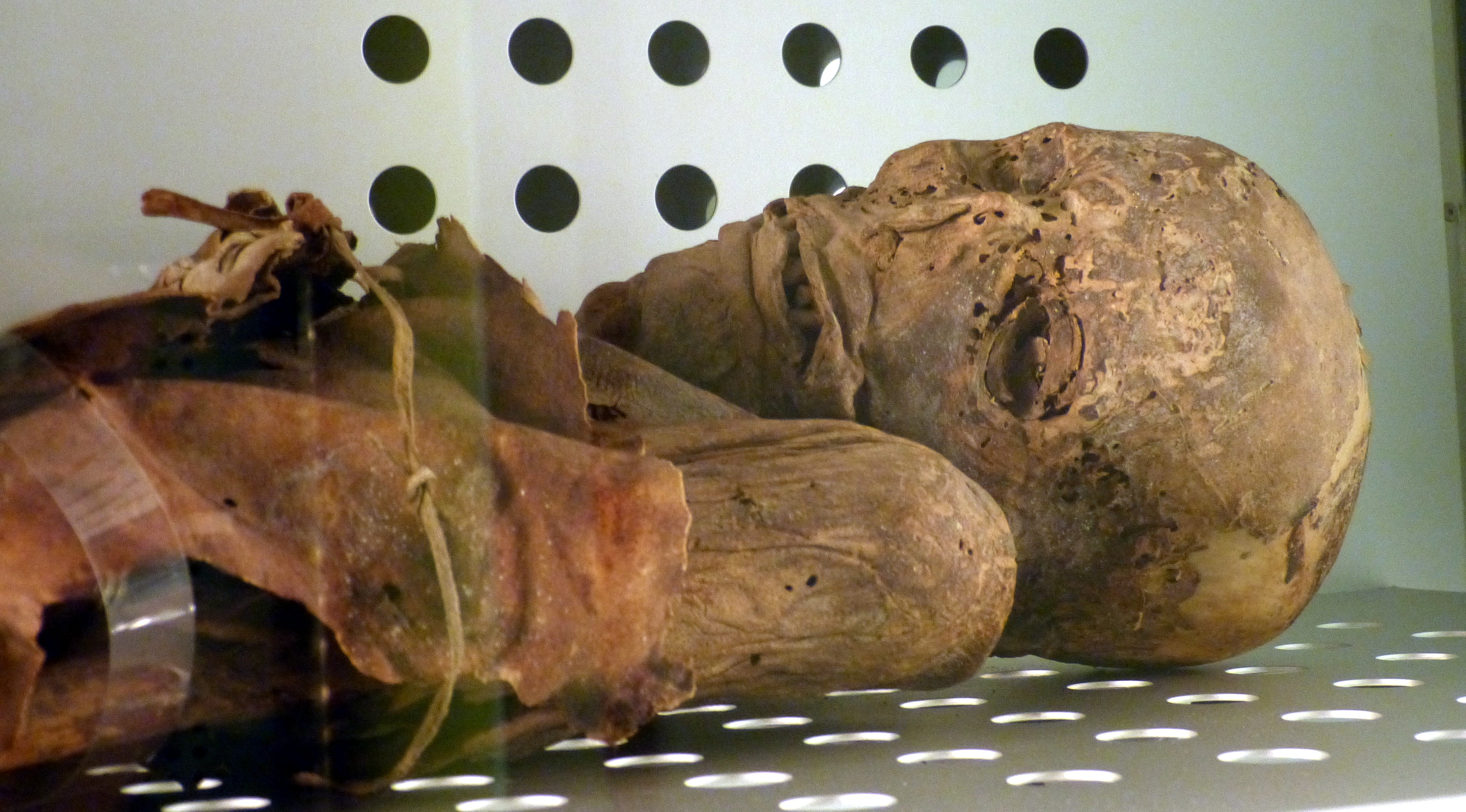
Mummy of San Andrés.

The museum features a formidable collection of mummies, ornaments, models of aboriginal settlements and pottery. The history uncovered ranges from the beginnings of the Guanche culture to the Conquest of the Canary Islands. Some of its key parts are:

- Guanche mummies – among which the famous Mummy of San Andrés
- Zanata Stone – rock with Berber-Punic inscriptions
- Guanche ceramics and personal items
- Mediterranean and Aegean amphoras found on the shores of the Canary Islands
- Thirteen Egyptian ceramics dated to 5700 years old, one of which is the oldest piece of this civilization in a Spanish museum.
  A tour of the museum
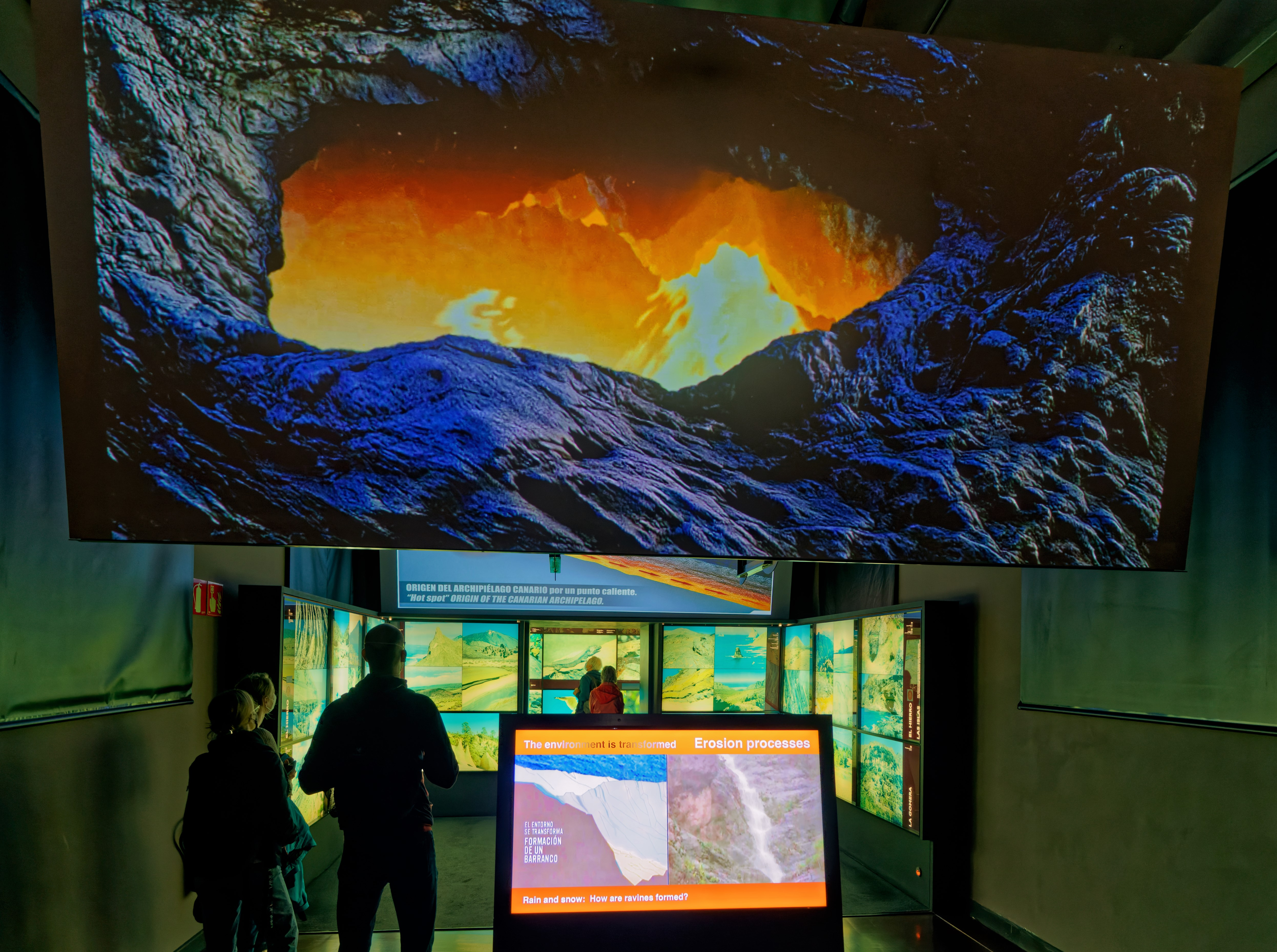
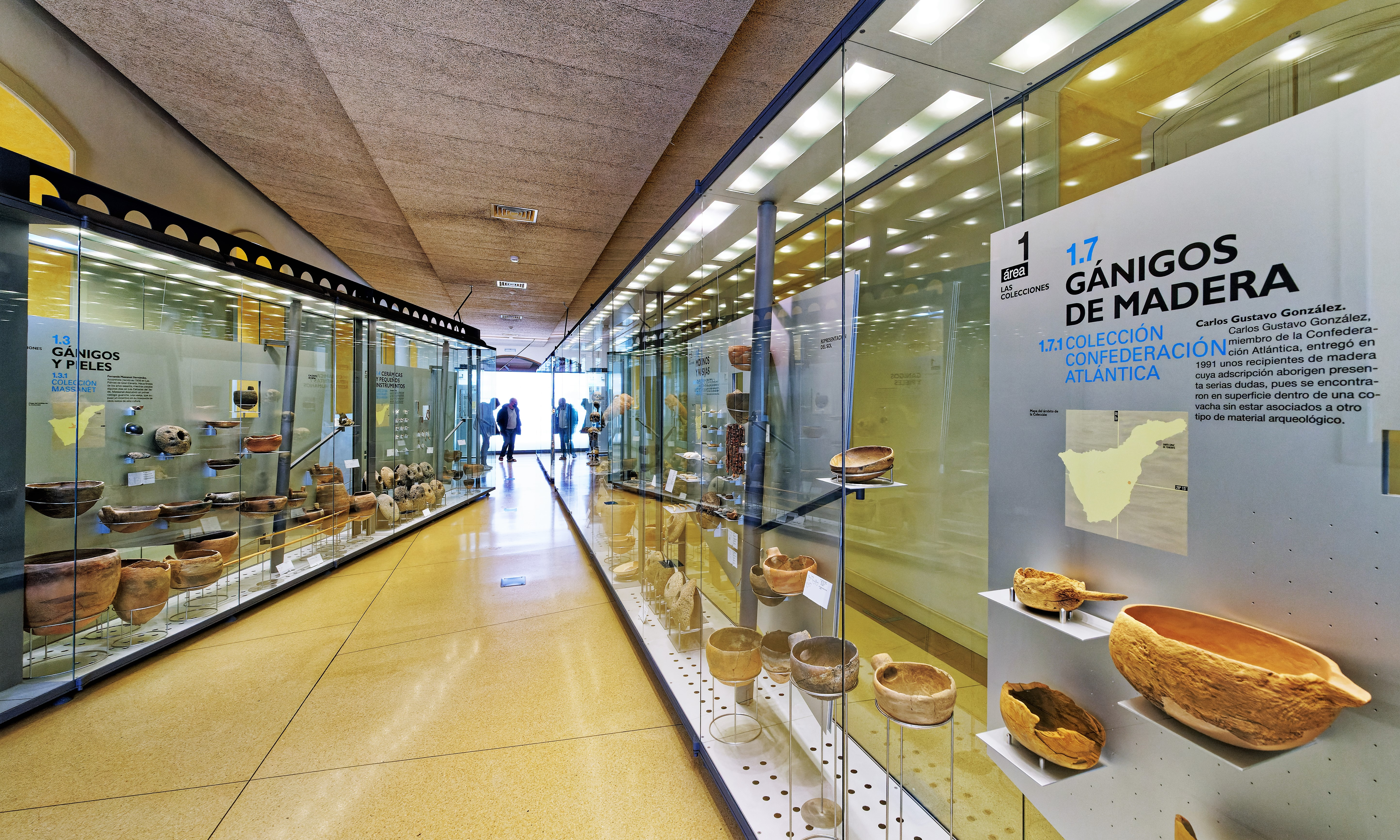
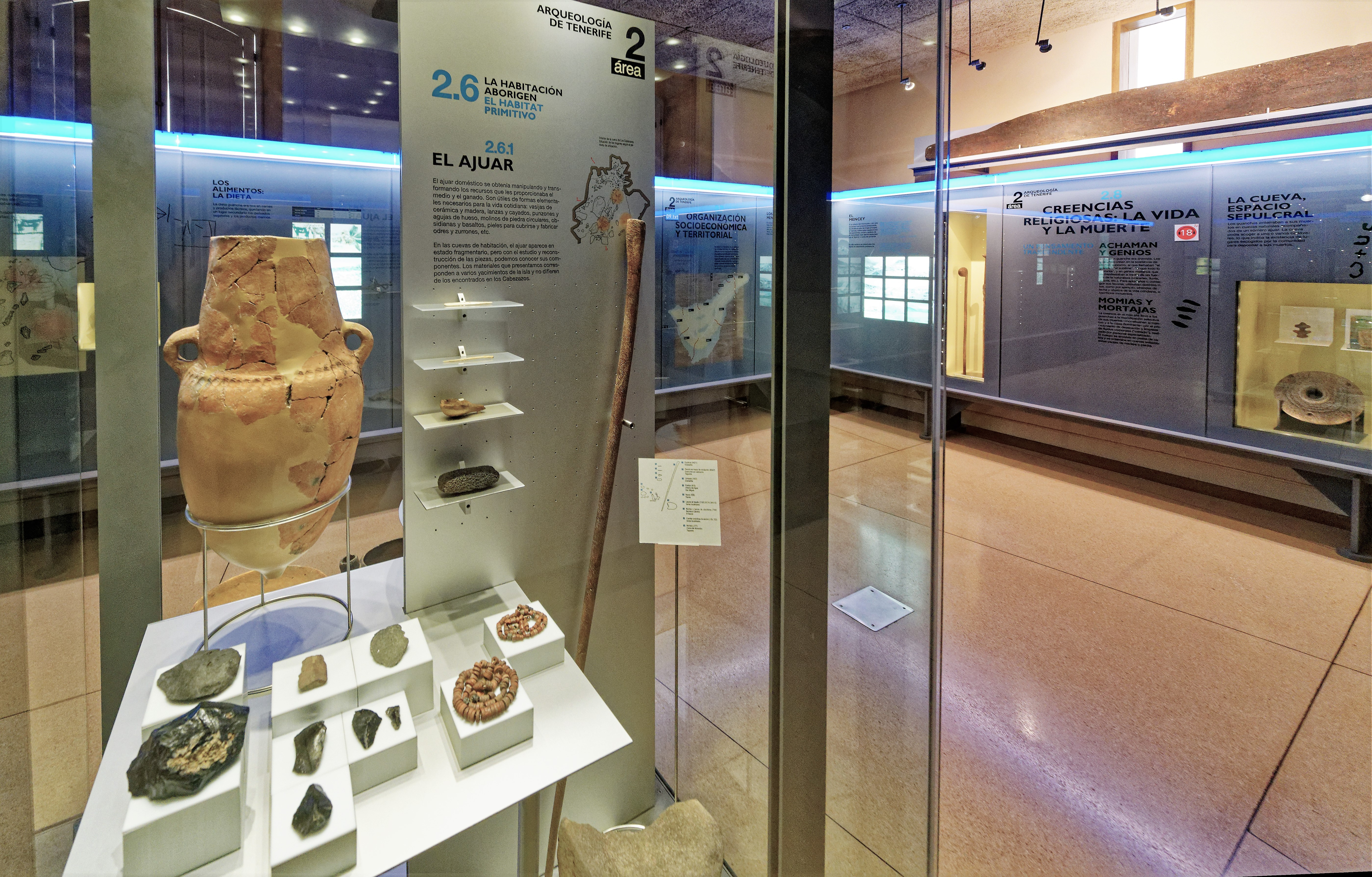
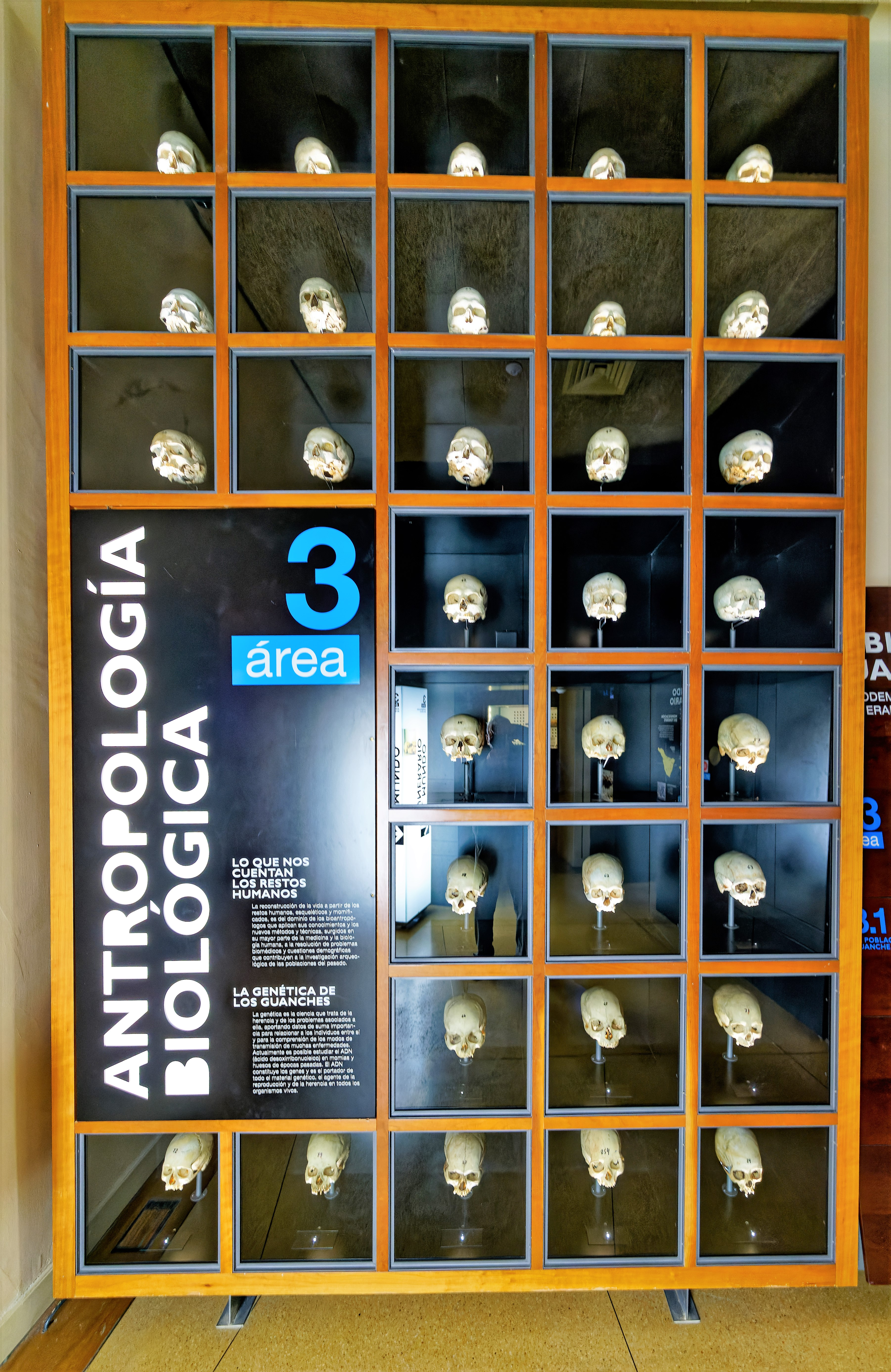
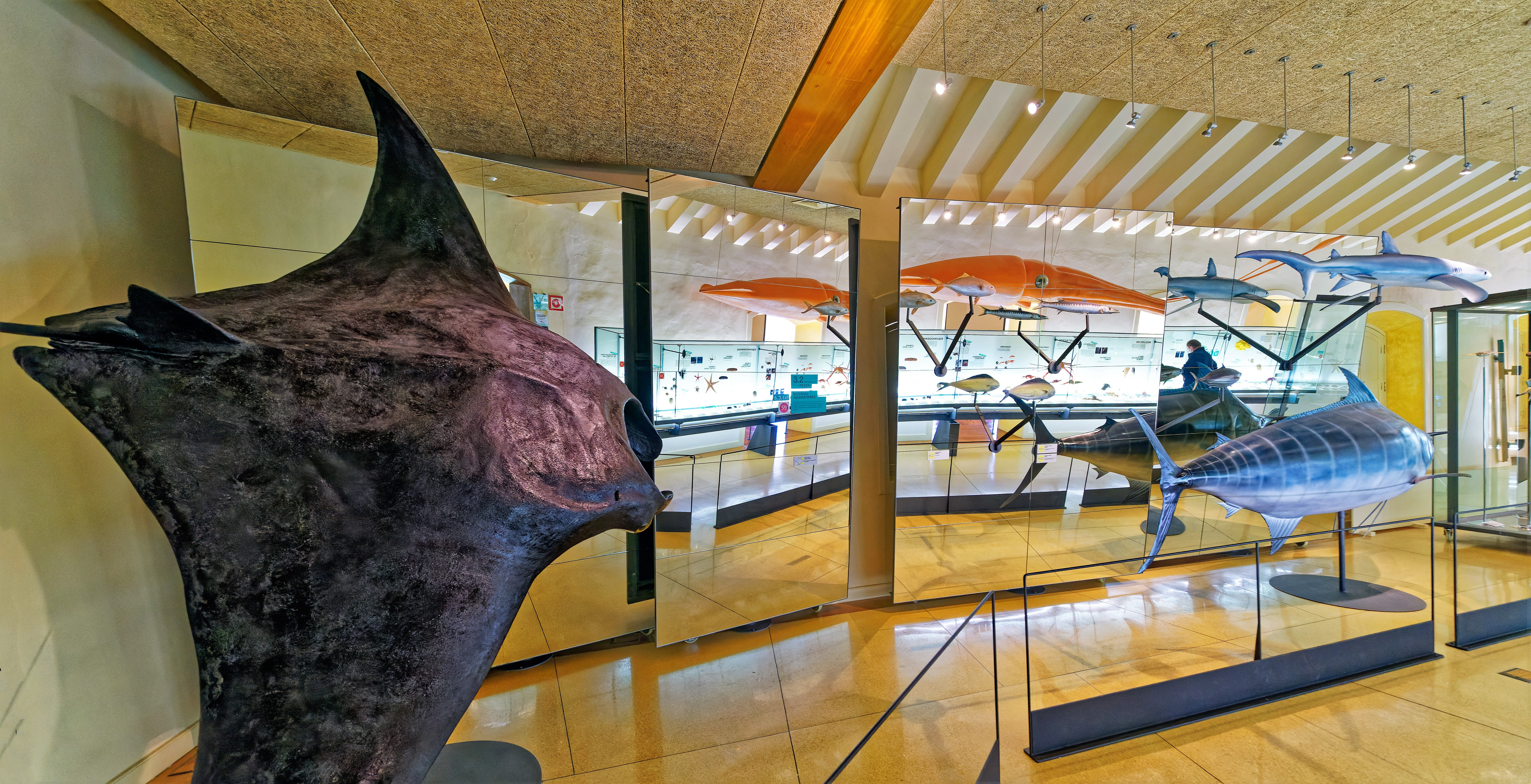

== Participation in projects ==
In 1992 the Museum of Nature and Man participated in an international research project on mummies (called PROJECT CRONOS), with a global exhibition of mummies. For this reason, the Museum of Nature and Man is a world reference in regard to preservation of mummies.

Foreign television companies such as the American JWM Productions (Discovery Channel) and NHK (Nippon Hoso Kyokai) have filmed in 2009 documentaries on mummies in the museum.

The Archaeological Museum of Tenerife took part in the Great Exhibition on mummies in 2010 which was held in Granada (Spain). The exhibition feature pieces from various civilizations and geographical environments including the 8000-year-old American "Chinchorro". There was also a representation of the sarcophagi of Egypt, the arid zones of the Andes, the marshes of Denmark, the "men of the ice" (like the mummy Ötzi), which appear from time to time in the cemeteries of Spanish and Guanche mummies in the museum.

Between 2014 and 2016 he held a similar exhibition entitled Momias, testigos del pasado (Mummies, witnesses of the past), held in the Parque de las Ciencias de Granada in Andalusia. This time the Archaeological Museum of Tenerife contributed to sample two Guanche mummies and other archaeological artifacts. As before, this exhibition was also mummified from various parts of the world and various ancient cultures remains.

In 2015, the South Korean public broadcaster KBS filmed the Guanche mummies museum, which will be included in a documentary titled "The Next Human", part a scientific project which aims to show the evolution of the human being through the findings of its own DNA.

In the summer of 2015 a documentary was also filmed in the museum premises. The "Misterio Adventura" program of Italian television.

Between December 2017 and June 2018, the museum hosted the exhibition "Athanatos. Inmortal. Muerte e inmortalidad en las poblaciones del pasado". It gathered examples of Egyptian, Andean, Muisca, Asian mummies, aboriginal mummies of Tenerife and Gran Canaria, and other elements related to funeral rituals. This initiative also included an extraordinary world congress of studies on mummies, as well as a research project. This congress counted with some of the best specialists in mummies worldwide, among them: Albert Zink, who studies Ötzi's mummy; Niels Lynnerup, researcher of the Bog body of northern Europe; Salima Ikram, specialist in ancient Egyptian animal mummies; Guido Lombardi, researcher of Inca mummies, etc. The exhibition commemorates the 25th anniversary of the PROJECT CRONOS, which gave the first mummies exhibition held internationally in Tenerife in February 1992, as well as the first world congress on studies on mummies.

== Illustrious visitors ==
Among the most important personalities who have visited the museum, stands out in October 2014, Stephen Hawking, who is considered the most famous scientist in the world.

== Name change ==
In November 2018, the Museum of Nature and Man officially changed its name to 'Museum of Nature and Archaeology', deleting the word "Man" to make it more inclusive with society. However, it is still better known by its old name.

== See also ==
- List of museums in Spain
