= Sharqi (wind) =

Seasonal Middle Eastern wind

The Sharqi or sharki /ˈʃɑːrki/ is a wind in the Middle East that comes from the south and southeast. It is seasonal, lasting from April to early June, and comes again between late September and November. The winds are dry and dusty, with occasional gusts up to 80 kilometres per hour (50 mph) and often kick up violent sand and dust storms that can carry sand a few thousand metres high, and can close down airports for short periods of time. These winds can last for a full day at the beginning and end of the season, and for several days during the middle of the season.
