= Güímar =

- Municipality
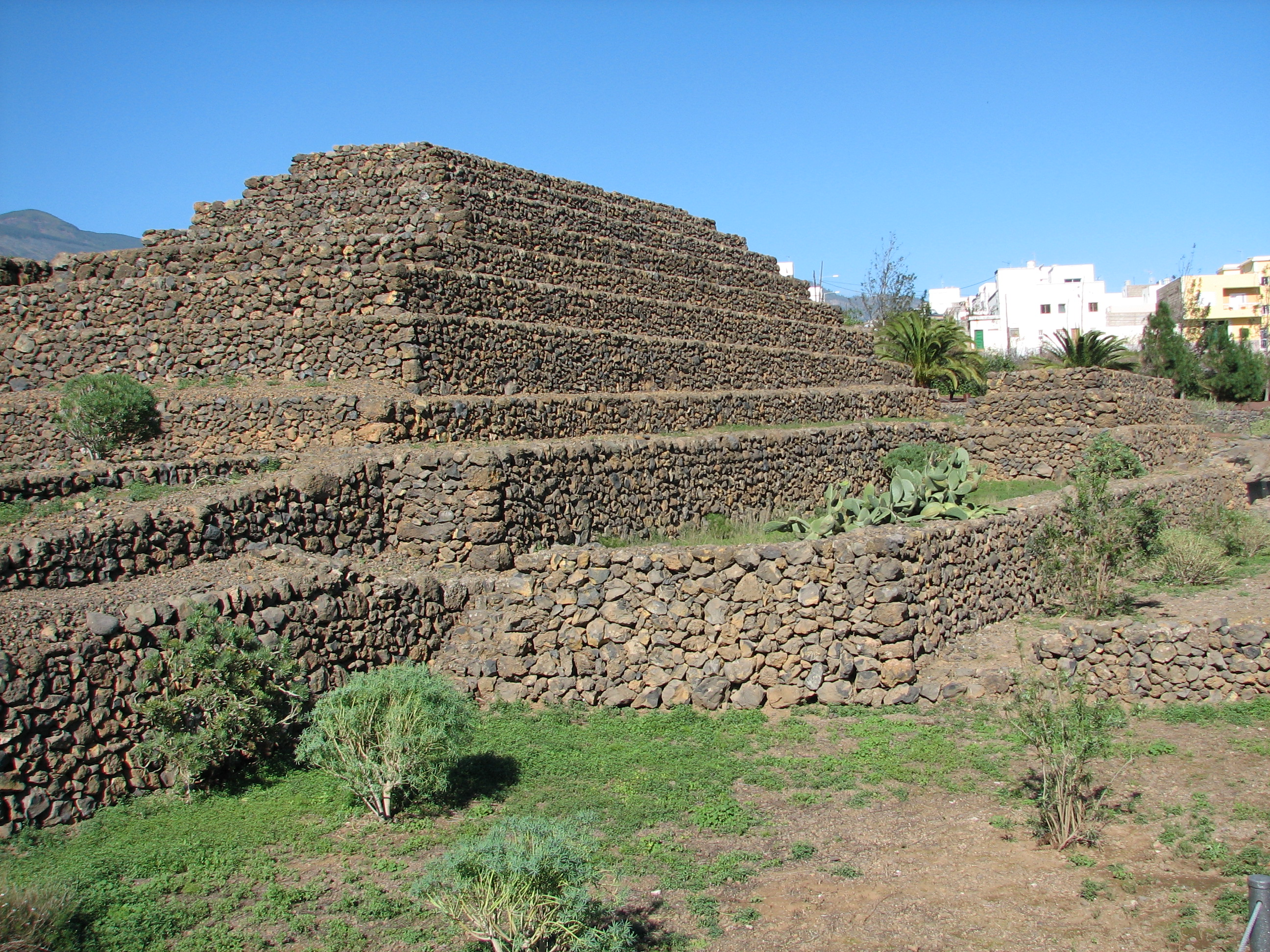
- Pyramids of Güímar

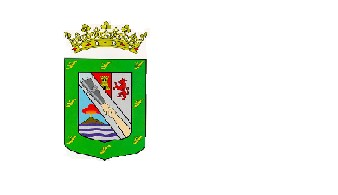
- Flag Coat of arms

- Municipal location in Tenerife

- Location in Tenerife Güímar (Canary Islands) Güímar (Spain, Canary Islands)
- Coordinates: 28°18′54″N 16°24′36″W
- Country: Spain
- Autonomous Community: Canary Islands
- Province: Tenerife
- Island: Tenerife

Government
  - Mayor: Carmen Luisa Castro Dorta (PP)

Area
  - Total: 102.9 km^{2} (39.7 sq mi)
- Elevation (AMSL): 289 m (948 ft)

Population (2025-01-01)
  - Total: 22,009
  - Density: 213.9/km^{2} (554.0/sq mi)
- Time zone: UTC+0 (CET)
  - Summer (DST): UTC+1 (CEST (GMT +1))
- Postal code: 38500
- Area code: +34 (Spain) + 922 (Tenerife)
- Climate: BWh
- Website: www.guimar.es

Güímar (Spanish pronunciation: [ˈgwimaɾ]) is the name of a municipality, town and valley in the eastern part of the Spanish island of Tenerife, one of the Canary Islands, and part of Santa Cruz de Tenerife (province). The municipality extends for 102.9 square kilometers from the mountainous interior to the beaches on the Atlantic, and borders the municipalities of La Orotava, Arafo and Fasnia. Its estimated population is 18,589 (2013). The TF-1 motorway passes through the municipality.

The municipality is famous for its pyramids. It is also the location of the barranco de Badajoz. A portion of its volcanic landscape has been set aside as the Nature reserve of Malpaís of Güímar, its highest point being Montaña Grande.

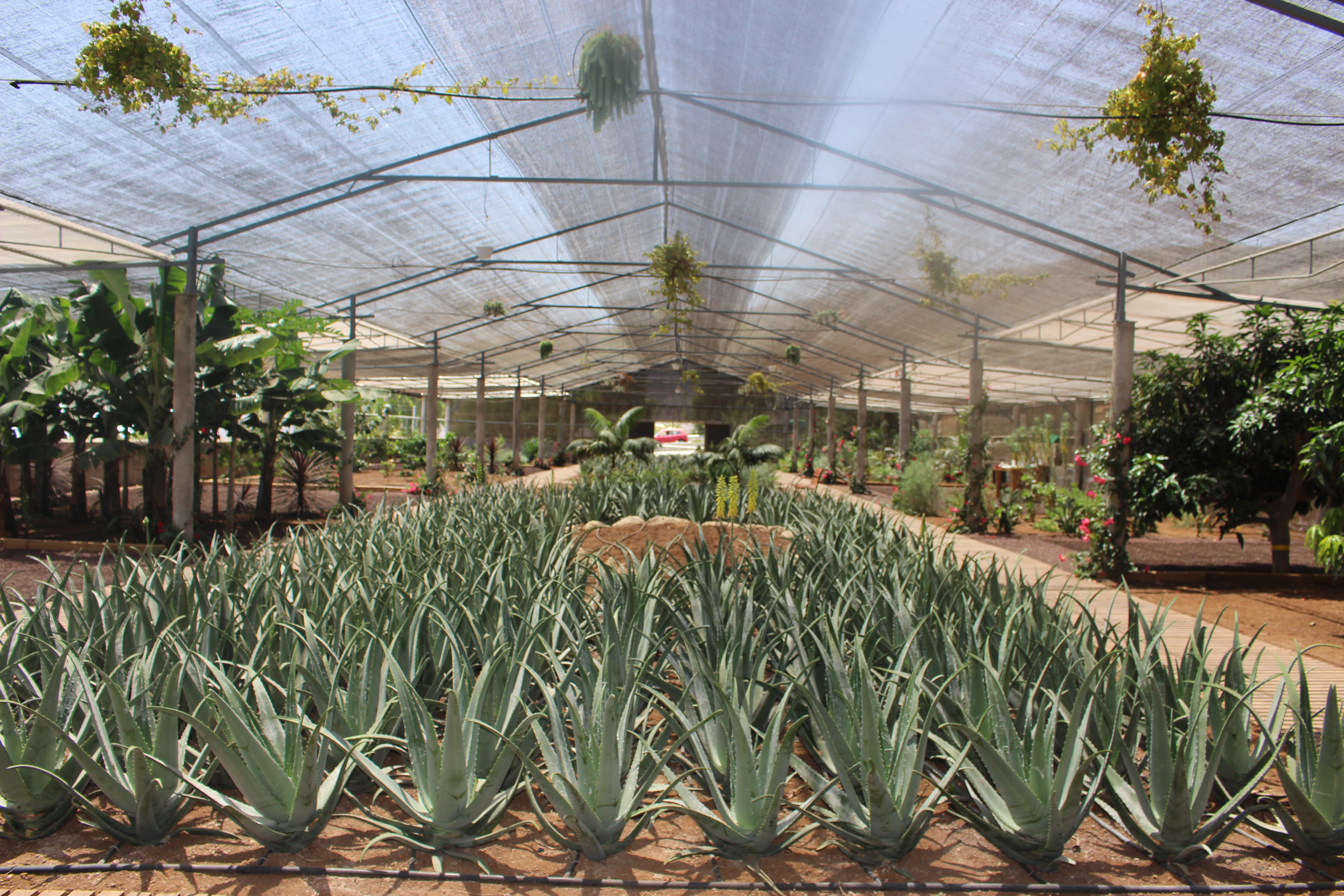
Aloe vera cultivation in a greenhouse in Güímar

== Name ==
The name comes from Guanche and is thought to mean 'angle, corner, nook'.

== History ==
The first population centre of Güímar originated in the sixteenth century in the neighbourhood of San Juan - also called Güímar de Arriba - near the springs of the Agua and Chamoco ravines. The first buildings were linked to the sugar mill started up by the brothers Juan Felipe and Blasino Piombino or Romano.

== Climate ==
Güímar is located in the eastern part of Tenerife, with the Atlantic Ocean on the east coast of the town. The Canary Current passes through this sea area, resulting in Güímar having a mild desert climate all year round. Güímar has a mild desert climate (Köppen: BWh; Trewartha: BWal) with an annual precipitation of only 149.9 millimetres (5.90 in) and no more than 29 days of precipitation. The average temperature throughout the year ranges from 17.0 °C (62.6 °F) in February to 24.0 °C (75.2 °F) in August. High temperature days above 30 °C (86 °F) are usually uncommon, but due to the close proximity to the Sahara Desert, a hot wind called Sharqi, making the place The temperature quickly exceeded 30 °C (86 °F) and even reached temperatures above 35 °C (95 °F) or even higher. The extreme temperatures throughout the year ranged from 9.4 °C (48.9 °F) on 17 March 2015 to 38.5 °C (101.3 °F) on 28 July 2017.

In September 2022, the entire Canary Islands, including Tenerife, experienced the heaviest rainfall since AEMET meteorological observations began. Güímar experienced three consecutive days of heavy rain, with the largest single-day rainfall in history of 113.8 millimetres (4.48 in) being measured on 25 September 2022. The total rainfall for the whole of September 2022 reached 268.0 millimetres (10.55 in), making it the month with the most rainfall in Güímar since meteorological observations began.

Climate data for Güímar WMO ID: 60018; Climate ID: C439J; coordinates 28°19′06″N 16°22′56″W; elevation: 115 m (377 ft); 1991–2020 normals, extremes 2014–present
Month	Jan	Feb	Mar	Apr	May	Jun	Jul	Aug	Sep	Oct	Nov	Dec	Year
Record high °C (°F)	27.2 (81.0)	28.6 (83.5)	33.1 (91.6)	33.2 (91.8)	35.9 (96.6)	36.1 (97.0)	38.5 (101.3)	37.9 (100.2)	33.1 (91.6)	38.1 (100.6)	32.5 (90.5)	27.4 (81.3)	38.5 (101.3)
Mean daily maximum °C (°F)	20.6 (69.1)	20.8 (69.4)	21.3 (70.3)	22.4 (72.3)	23.9 (75.0)	25.5 (77.9)	27.6 (81.7)	27.9 (82.2)	26.9 (80.4)	26.0 (78.8)	23.6 (74.5)	21.8 (71.2)	24.0 (75.2)
Daily mean °C (°F)	17.0 (62.6)	17.0 (62.6)	17.4 (63.3)	18.2 (64.8)	19.7 (67.5)	21.4 (70.5)	23.3 (73.9)	24.0 (75.2)	23.3 (73.9)	22.1 (71.8)	20.1 (68.2)	18.1 (64.6)	20.1 (68.2)
Mean daily minimum °C (°F)	13.4 (56.1)	13.1 (55.6)	13.5 (56.3)	14.0 (57.2)	15.4 (59.7)	17.3 (63.1)	19.0 (66.2)	20.0 (68.0)	19.6 (67.3)	18.2 (64.8)	16.6 (61.9)	14.4 (57.9)	16.2 (61.2)
Record low °C (°F)	9.7 (49.5)	9.5 (49.1)	9.4 (48.9)	11.0 (51.8)	12.0 (53.6)	13.0 (55.4)	15.8 (60.4)	16.2 (61.2)	16.2 (61.2)	14.6 (58.3)	12.4 (54.3)	10.1 (50.2)	9.4 (48.9)
Average precipitation mm (inches)	8.7 (0.34)	24.7 (0.97)	17.7 (0.70)	3.4 (0.13)	5.6 (0.22)	0.3 (0.01)	0.1 (0.00)	9.5 (0.37)	2.5 (0.10)	40.3 (1.59)	25.8 (1.02)	11.2 (0.44)	149.9 (5.90)
Average precipitation days (≥ 0.1 mm)	2.71	2.86	2.86	1.83	1.43	0.29	0.14	1.14	1.86	5.00	6.33	2.29	28.74
Average relative humidity (%)	61	59	64	65	64	64	62	64	69	69	67	63	64
Source: State Meteorological Agency/AEMET OpenData
