= Guanche mummies =

Desiccated corpses of the indigenous people of Tenerife

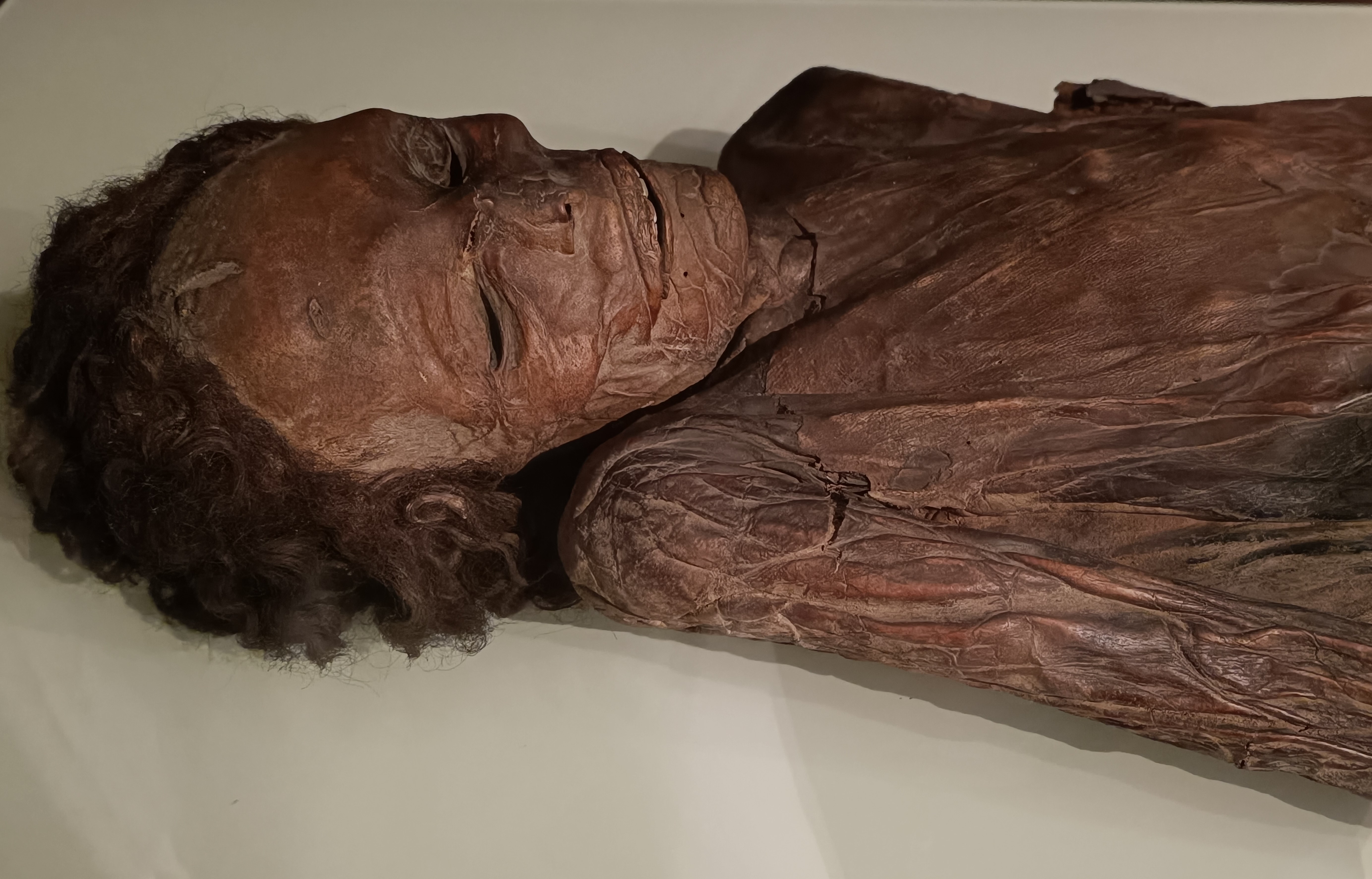
- The Guanche mummy of Madrid, an example of Guanche mummification
- Culture: Guanche people
- Location: Tenerife, Canary Islands
- Period: Before the 15th-century Spanish conquest
- Type: Intentionally preserved human remains

Guanche mummies (Canarian Spanish: xaxos, formerly ['ʃaʃos]; mirlados, 'embalmed ones'; enzurronados, 'leather-bagged ones') are the intentionally desiccated remains of members of the indigenous Guanche people of the Tenerife. The Guanche mummies were made during the eras prior to Spanish settlement of the area in the 15th century. The methods of embalming are similar to those that were used by the Ancient Egyptians, though fewer mummies remain from the Guanche due to looting and desecration.

== Discovery ==
Medieval Spanish explorers arriving in the islands during the 14th century reported the Guanche buried individuals of low social status in sandy graves, while upper class members were mummified and placed in secluded caves. One of these mortuary caves may have held up to 1,000 mummies. However, many of these have disappeared, with only twenty complete mummies left on the islands. The loss of such a large number of mummies is generally attributed to the popularity of mummia, a pharmaceutical substance created out of pulverized mummies.

In 1933, the Guanche necropolis of Uchova was discovered in the municipality of San Miguel de Abona in southern Tenerife. It is estimated that it contained between 60 and 74 mummies before the cemetery was almost completely looted.

== Archaeological record ==
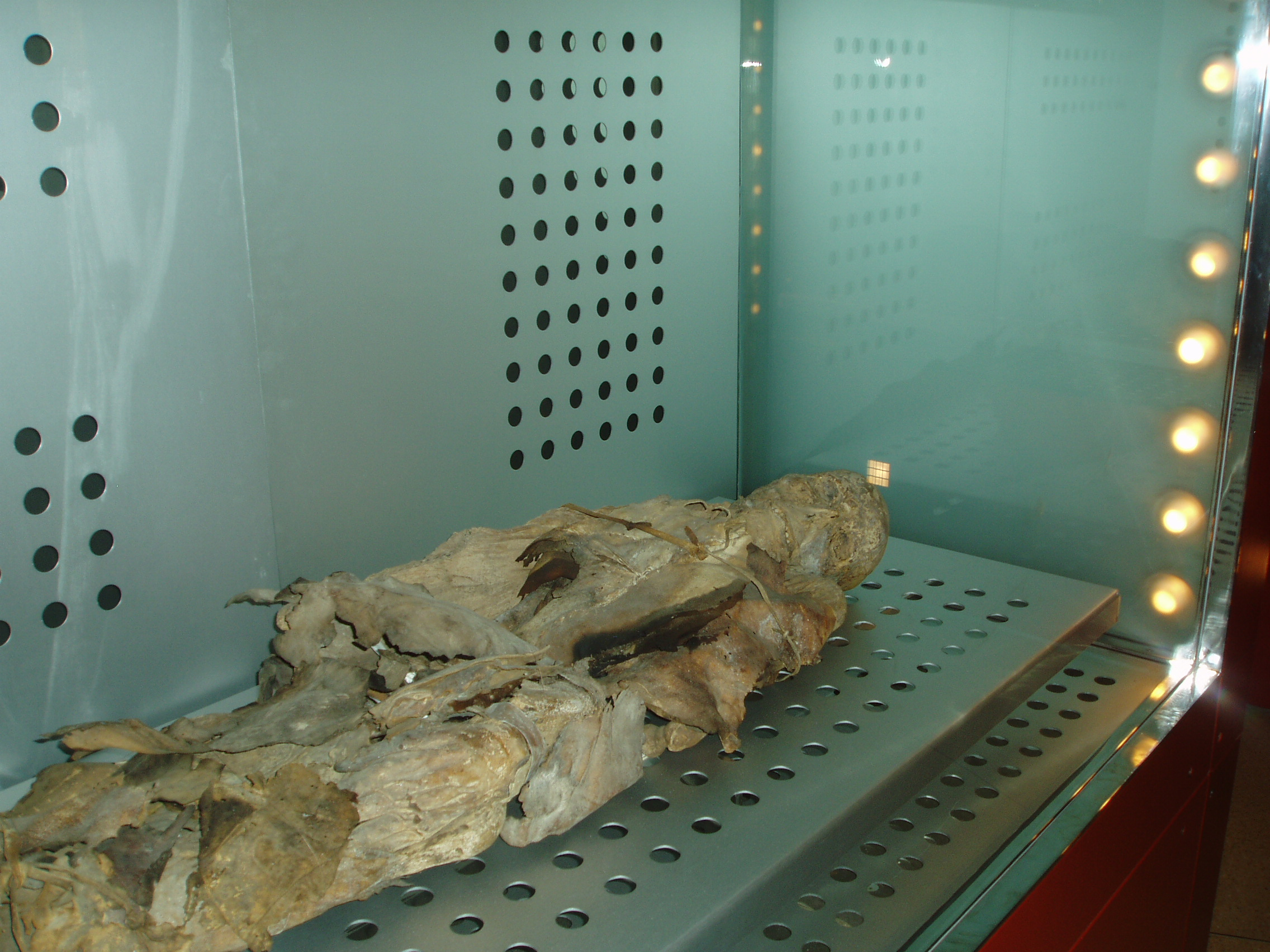
Mummy of San Andrés in the Museo de la Naturaleza y el Hombre

Mummification on the Canary Islands during the Guanche period remained confined to Tenerife. In Gran Canaria there is currently a debate on the true nature of the mummies of the ancient inhabitants of the island, as researchers point out that there was no real intention to mummify the deceased and that the good conservation of some of them is due rather to environmental factors. In La Palma they were preserved by these environmental factors and in La Gomera, and El Hierro the existence of mummification is not verified. In Lanzarote and Fuerteventura this practice is ruled out. The most well-preserved, and therefore the most thoroughly-studied, mummies were found on Tenerife.

== Bodies and health ==
Physical examination of the Guanche mummies of Tenerife found that they were quite tall. On average, the males stood 1.70 m (5 ft 7 in) and the females were 1.57 m (5 ft 2 in) in height. They were also generally of robust constitution, and hair colour results taken from samples, revealed no major distinctions from current Canary Islanders.

The oldest mummified remains of the Canary Islands are from the 3rd century CE and were found on Tenerife.

== Mummification process ==
The Guanche had groups of males and females, working as mummification specialists, who would carry out the process according to the gender of the decedent. The Guanche culture considered these individuals unclean due to the nature of their work.

While early explorers reported various traditions associated with Guanche mummification (mirlado in Canarian Spanish), there are three methods identified in modern times through scientific analysis: evisceration, preservation, and stuffing. These methods have been used in various combinations depending on the era in which the mummy was created.

In 1876, Dr. Don Gregorio Chil y Naranjo discovered several incisions in some mummies that he speculated may have been used to remove the internal organs. Don Brothwell's work in 1969 confirmed that evisceration was a method used by the Guanche. Along with a team of other scientists, Brothwell conducted a pathological examination of a Guanche mummy. The examination revealed that the body had been eviscerated, then the abdominal and thoracic cavities had been packed with a mud-like substance that contained the bark of a pine tree. Some sort of packing was also applied subcutaneously, but the exact make-up of this particular embalming substance is unknown.

In 1991, an examination conducted by Patrick Horne of a mummy held at the Redpath Museum at McGill University in Montreal, Quebec, Canada, revealed moss had been used to stuff the empty abdominal cavity. In addition to the moss, there were several other types of local plants that had been preserved inside the body as packing.

Preservation of the outer parts of the body was normally achieved through a combination of resins and animal skin wrappings. The resins were prepared with a mixture of minerals, plants, and fats. These were spread across the body prior to allowing it to dry, either in the sun or through smoking. Finally, the deceased was wrapped in animal skins. The number of animal skins used in wrapping corresponded with the individual's social status, with kings being wrapped with up to 15 skins.

== DNA analysis ==
A 2017 DNA analysis study has shown that the ancestors of the Guanches originated from North Africa.

== Individual Guanche mummies ==
- Guanche mummy of Madrid – Mummified Guanche man from 12th- or 13th-century Tenerife
- Guanche mummies of Necochea – Two Guanche mummies returned from Argentina to Tenerife
- Mummy of San Andrés – Guanche mummy
