= Pyramid =

Structure shaped as a geometric pyramid

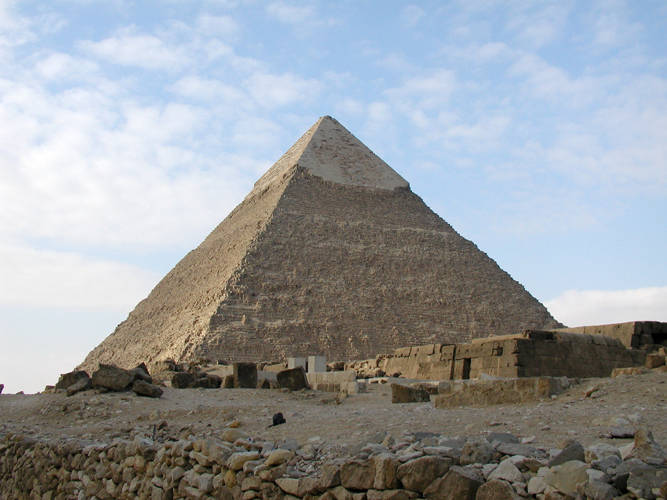
Pyramid of Khafre, Egypt, built c. 2600 BC

A pyramid (from Ancient Greek πυραμίς (puramís) 'pyramid', is a structure whose visible surfaces are triangular in broad outline and converge toward the top, making the appearance roughly a pyramid in the geometric sense. The base of a pyramid can be of any polygon shape, such as triangular or quadrilateral, and its surface-lines either filled or stepped.

A pyramid has the majority of its mass closer to the ground with less mass towards the pyramidion at the apex. This is due to the gradual decrease in the cross-sectional area along the vertical axis with increasing elevation. This offers a weight distribution that allowed early civilizations to create monumental structures.

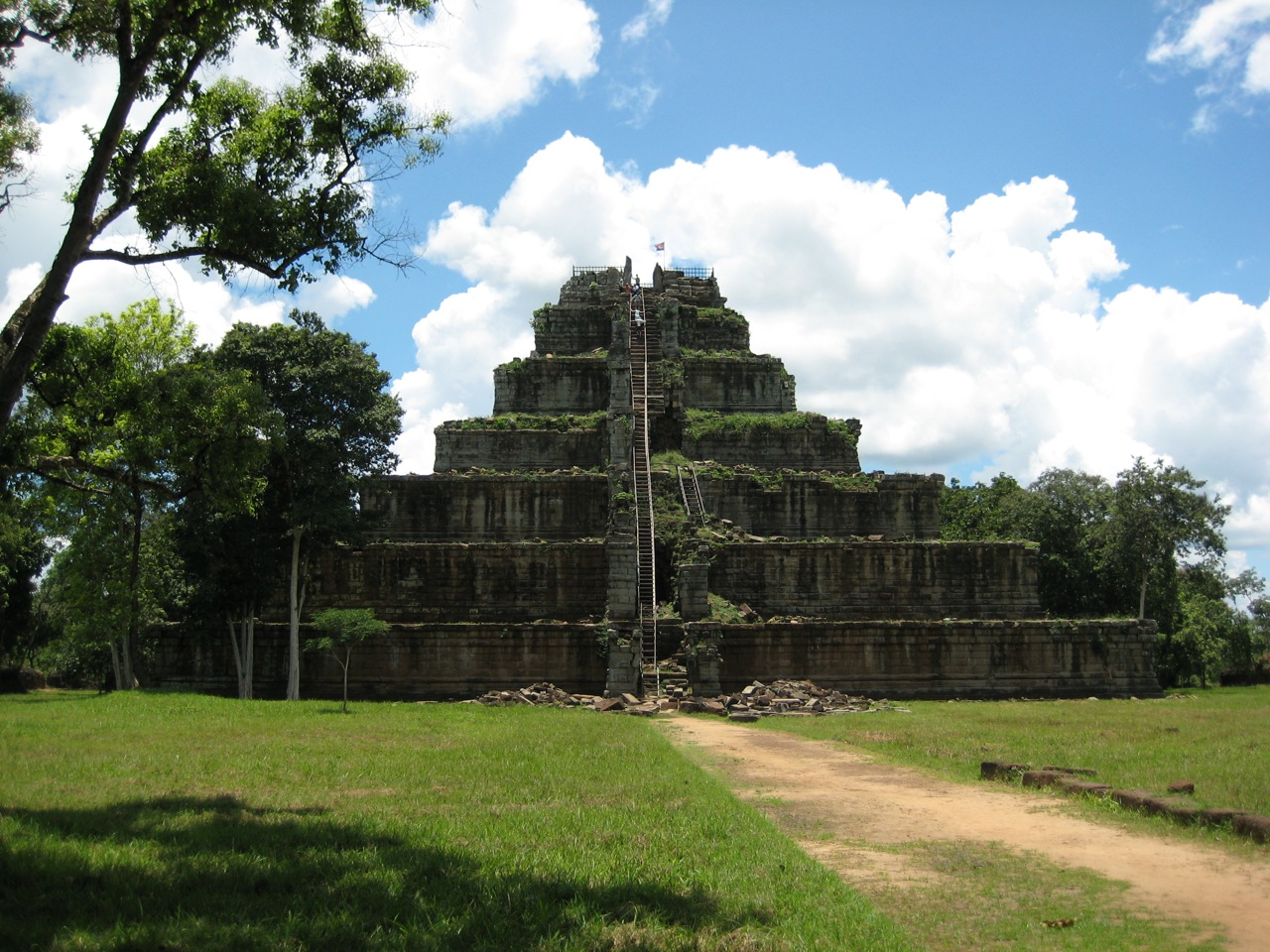
Prasat Thom temple at Koh Ker, Cambodia

Ancient civilizations in many parts of the world pioneered the building of pyramids. The largest pyramid by volume is the Mesoamerican Great Pyramid of Cholula, in the Mexican state of Puebla. For millennia, the largest structures on Earth were pyramids—first the Red Pyramid in the Dashur Necropolis and then the Great Pyramid of Khufu, both in Egypt. The latter is the only extant example of the Seven Wonders of the Ancient World.

== Ancient monuments ==
=== West Asia ===
==== Mesopotamia ====
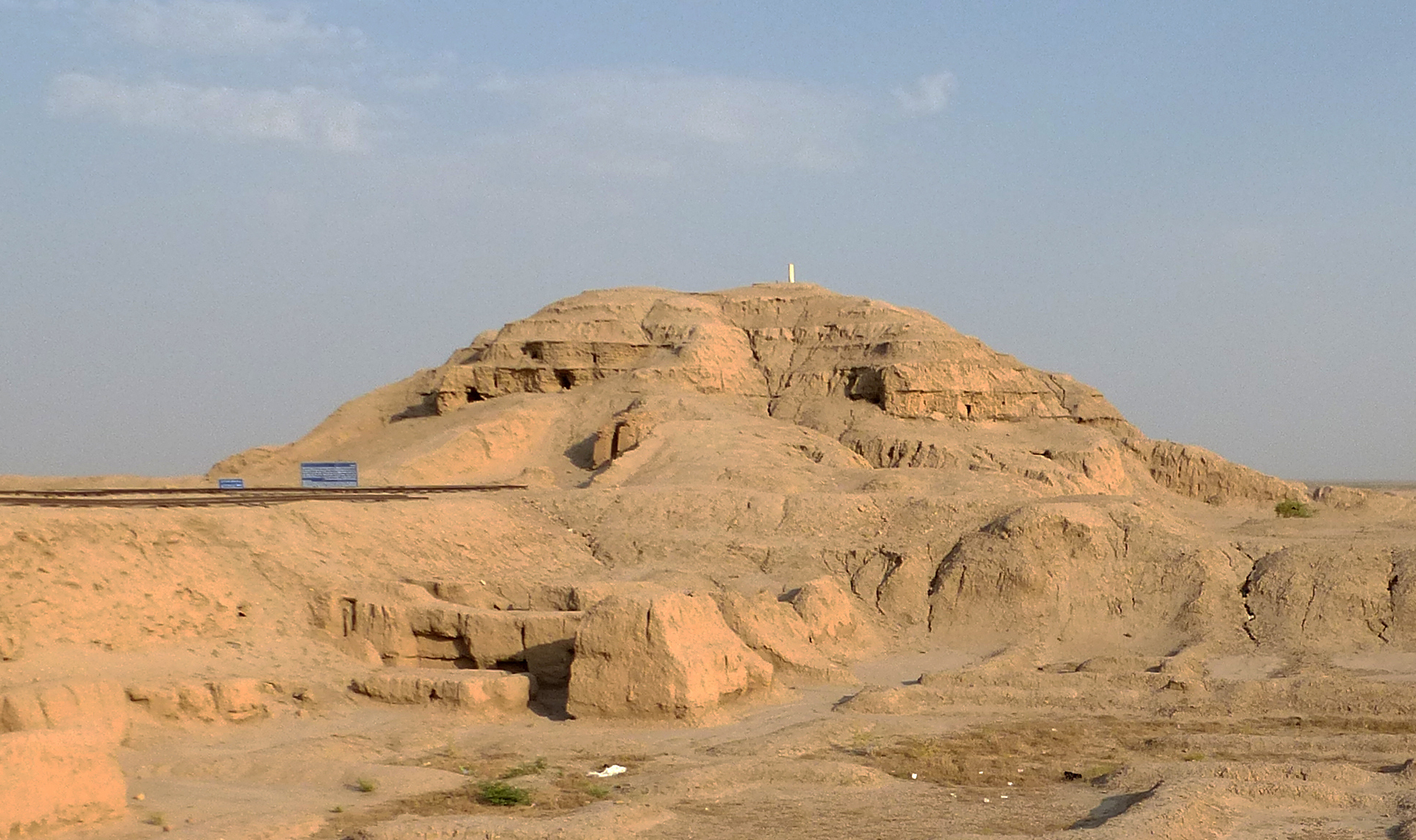
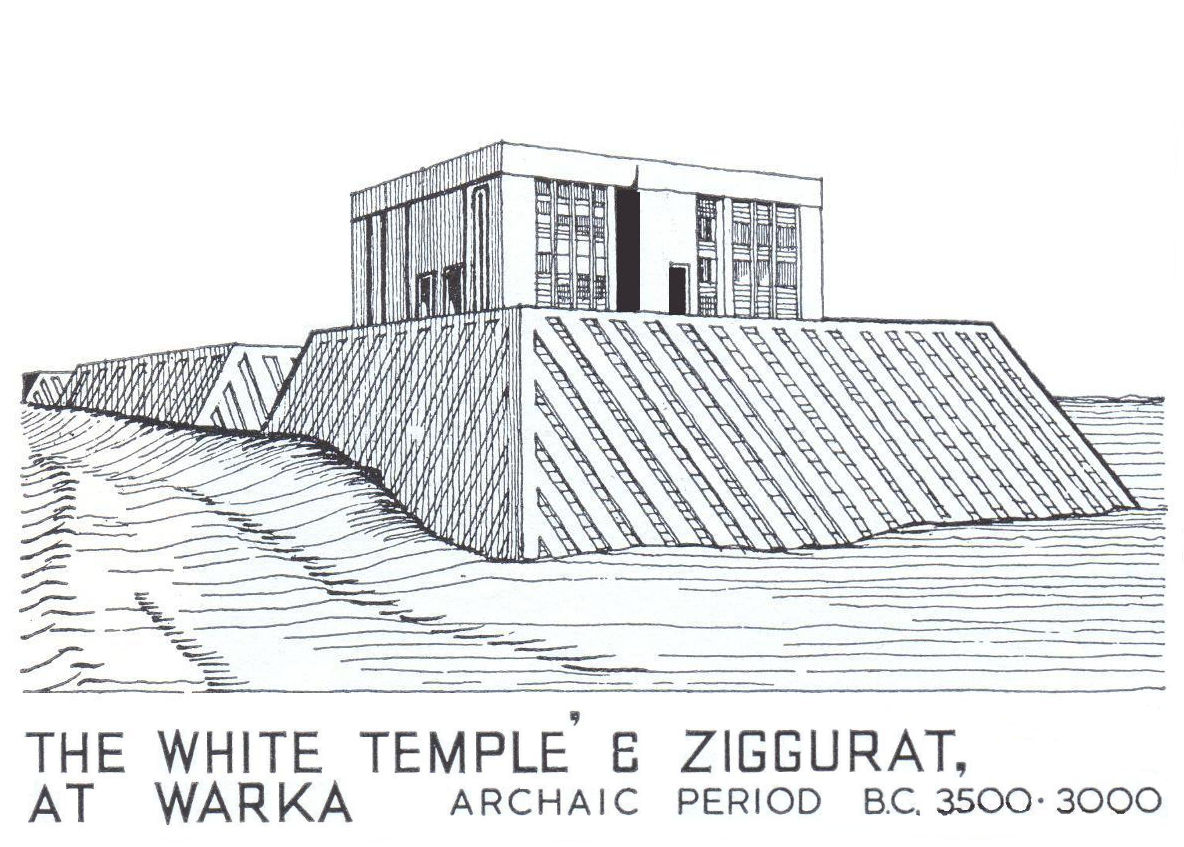
Anu ziggurat and White Temple at Uruk

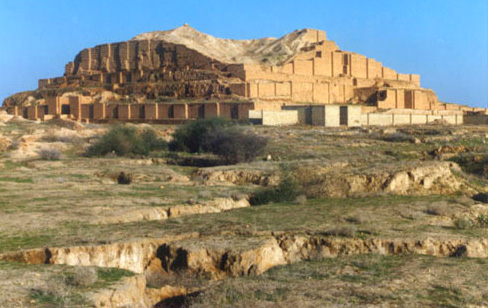
Chogha Zanbil is an ancient Elamite complex in the Khuzestan province of Iran.

The Mesopotamians built the earliest pyramidal structures, called ziggurats. In ancient times, these were brightly painted in gold/bronze. They were constructed of sun-dried mud-brick, and little remains of them. Ziggurats were built by the Sumerians, Babylonians, Elamites, Akkadians, and Assyrians. Each ziggurat was part of a temple complex that included other buildings. The ziggurat's precursors were raised platforms that date from the Ubaid period of the fourth millennium BC.

The earliest ziggurats began near the end of the Early Dynastic Period. The original pyramidal structure, the anu ziggurat, dates to around 4000 BC. The White Temple was built on top of it circa 3500 BC. Built in receding tiers upon a rectangular, oval, or square platform, the ziggurat was a pyramidal structure with a flat top. Sun-baked bricks made up the core of the ziggurat with facings of fired bricks on the outside. The facings were often glazed in different colors and may have had astrological significance. Kings sometimes had their names engraved on them. The number of tiers ranged from two to seven. It is assumed that they had shrines at the top, but no archaeological evidence supports this and the only textual evidence is from Herodotus. Access to the shrine would have been by a series of ramps on one side of the ziggurat or by a spiral ramp from base to summit.

=== Africa ===
==== Egypt ====
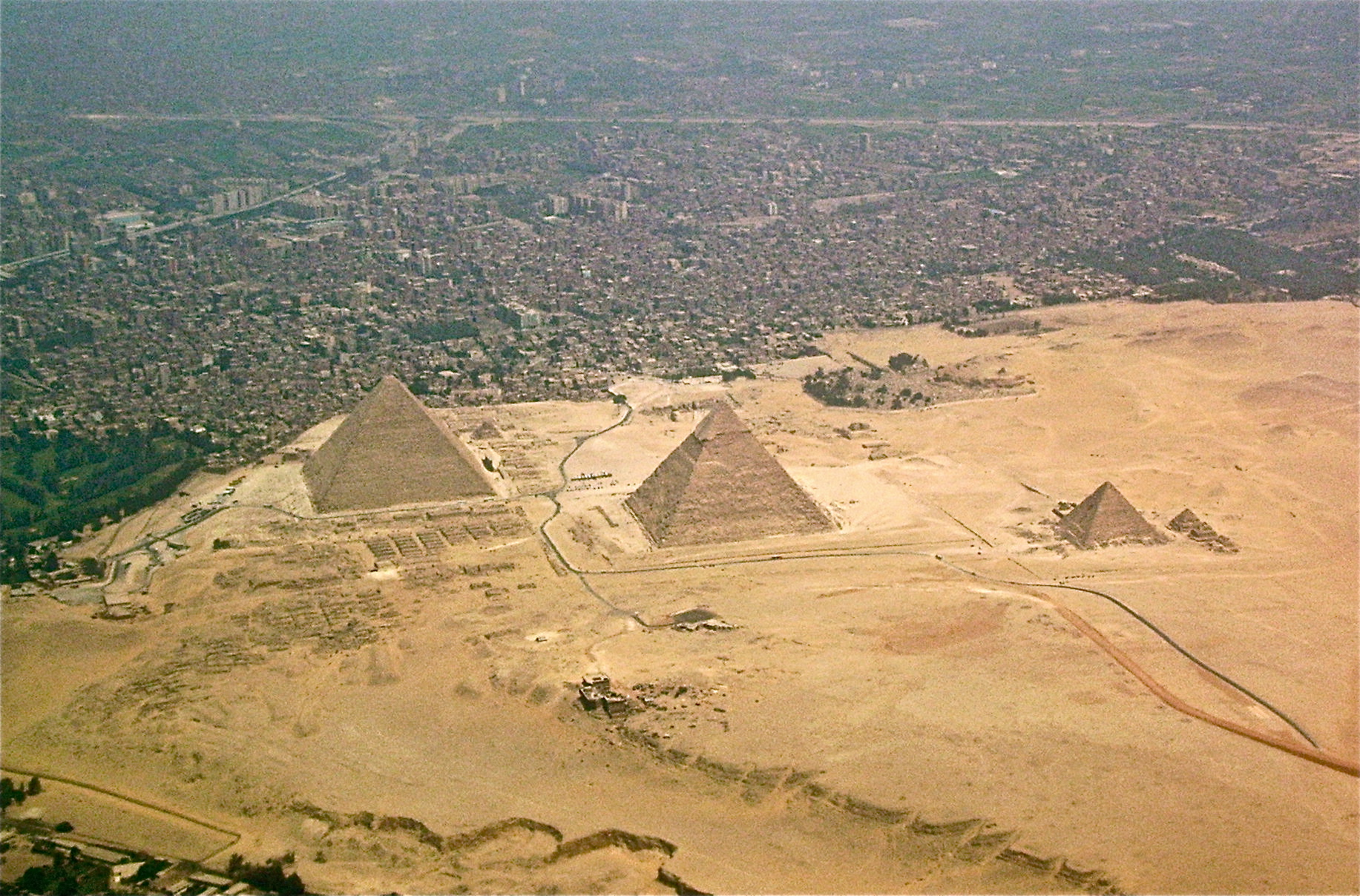
The pyramids of the Giza necropolis, as seen from the air

The most famous African pyramids are in Egypt—huge structures built of bricks or stones, primarily limestone, some of which are among the world's largest constructions. They are shaped in reference to the sun's rays. Most had a smoothed white limestone surface. Many of the facing stones have fallen or were removed and used for construction in Cairo. The capstone was usually made of limestone, granite or basalt and some were plated with electrum.

Ancient Egyptians built pyramids from 2700 BC until around 1700 BC. The first pyramid was erected during the Third Dynasty by the Pharaoh Djoser and his architect Imhotep. This step pyramid, originally begun as a square mastaba, consisted of six levels. Early kings such as Snefru built pyramids, with subsequent kings adding to the number until the end of the Middle Kingdom. The age of the pyramids reached its zenith at Giza in 2575–2150 BC. The last king to build royal pyramids was Ahmose, with later kings hiding their tombs in the hills, such as those in the Valley of the Kings in Luxor's West Bank. In Medinat Habu and Deir el-Medina, smaller pyramids were built by individuals. Smaller pyramids with steeper sides were built by the Nubians who ruled Egypt in the Late Period.

The Great Pyramid of Giza is the largest in Egypt and one of the largest in the world. At 146.6 metres (481 ft) it was the tallest structure in the world until the Lincoln Cathedral was finished in 1311 AD. Its base covers an area of around 53,000 square metres (570,000 sq ft). The Great Pyramid is the only extant one of the Seven Wonders of the Ancient World.

Ancient Egyptian pyramids were, in most cases, placed west of the river Nile because the divine pharaoh's soul was meant to join with the sun during its descent before continuing with the sun in its eternal round. As of 2008, some 135 pyramids had been discovered in Egypt, most located near Cairo.

==== Sudan ====
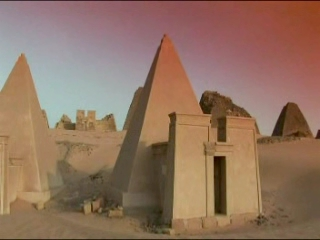
Pyramids at Meroe with pylon-like entrances

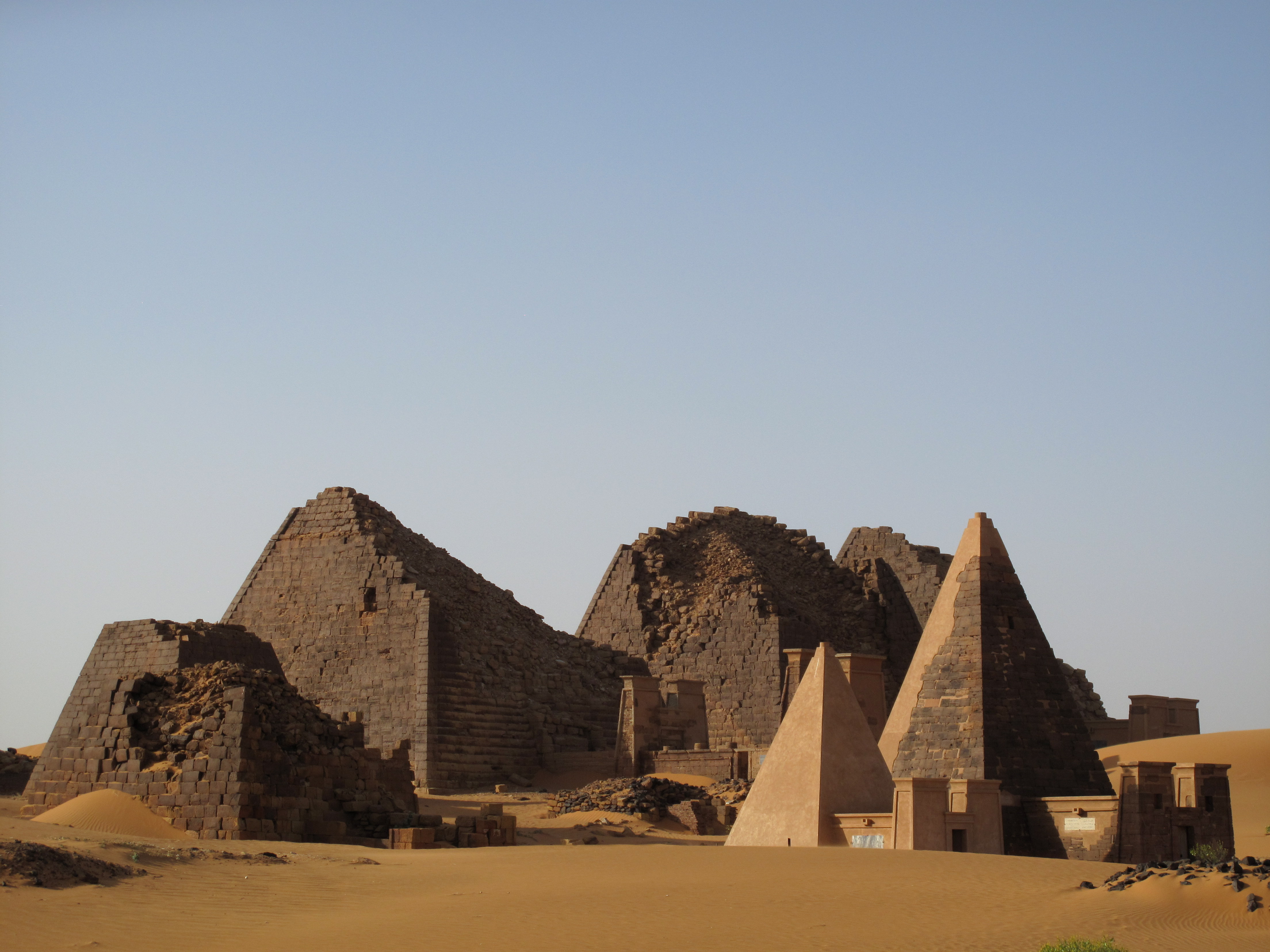
Nubian pyramids at archaeological sites of the Island of Meroe

While African pyramids are commonly associated with Egypt, Sudan has 220 extant pyramids, the most in the world. Nubian pyramids were constructed (roughly 240 of them) at three sites in Sudan to serve as tombs for the kings and queens of Napata and Meroë. The pyramids of Kush, also known as Nubian Pyramids, have different characteristics than those of Egypt. The Nubian pyramids had steeper sides than the Egyptian ones. Pyramids were built in Sudan as late as 200 AD.

==== Sahel ====
The Tomb of Askia, in Gao, Mali, is believed to be the burial place of Askia Mohammad I, one of the Songhai Empire's most prolific emperors. It was built at the end of the fifteenth century and is designated as a UNESCO World Heritage Site.

UNESCO describes the tomb as an example of the monumental mud-building traditions of the West African Sahel. The complex includes the pyramidal tomb, two mosques, a cemetery and an assembly ground. At 17 metres (56 ft) in height it is the largest pre-colonial architectural monument in Gao. It is a notable example of the Sudano-Sahelian architectural style that later spread throughout the region.

==== Nigeria ====
One of the unique structures of Igbo culture was the Nsude pyramids, in the Nigerian town of Nsude, northern Igboland. Ten pyramidal structures were built of clay/mud. The first base section was 60 ft (18 m) in circumference and 3 ft (0.9 m) in height. The next stack was 45 ft (14 m) in circumference. Circular stacks continued to the top. The structures were temples for the god Ala, who was believed to reside there. A stick was placed at the top to represent the god's residence. The structures were laid in groups of five parallel to each other. Because it was built of clay/mud like the Deffufa of Nubia, over time periodic reconstruction has been required.

=== Europe ===
==== Greece ====
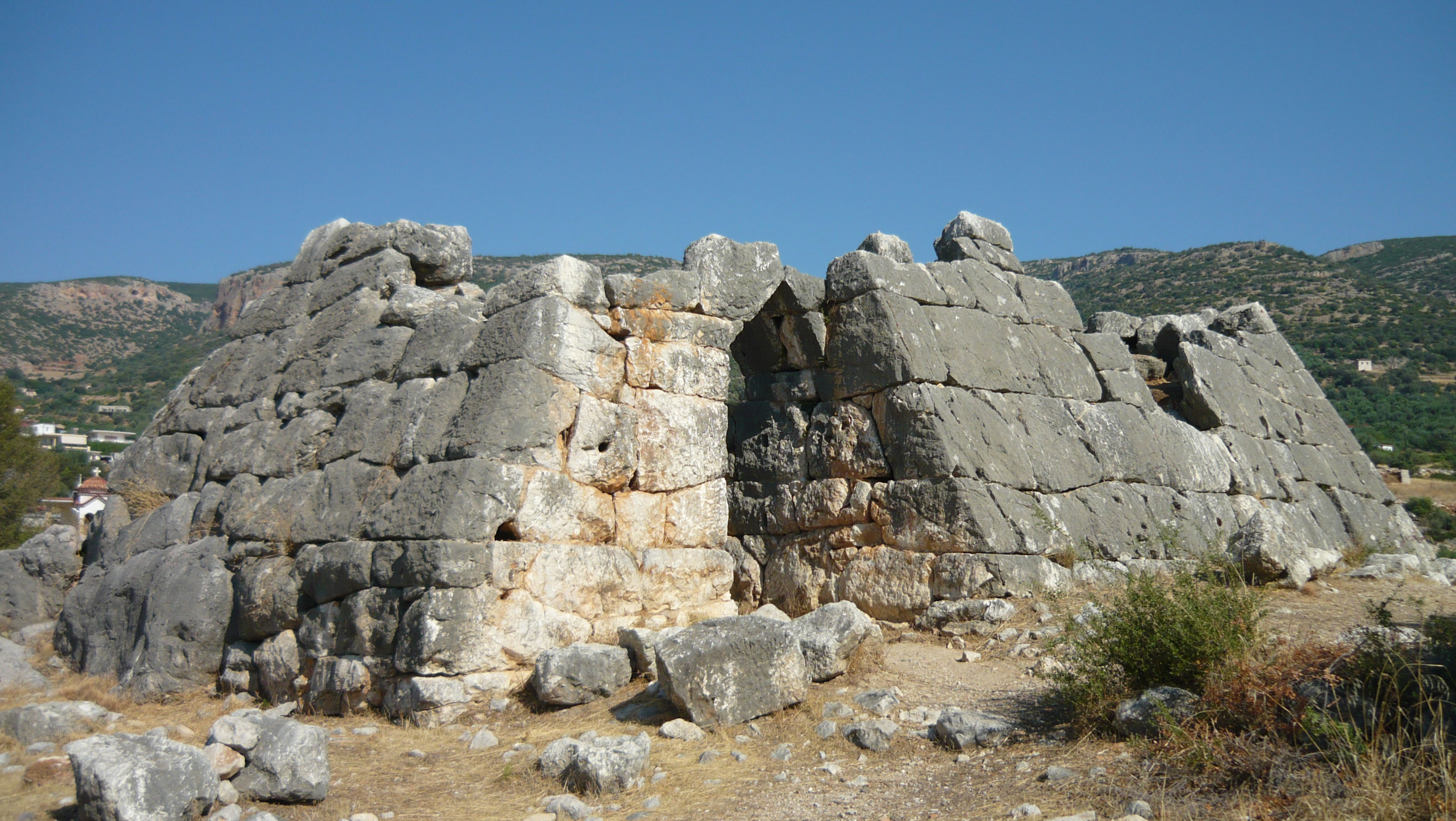
Pyramid of Hellinikon

Pausanias (2nd century AD) mentions two buildings resembling pyramids, one, 19 kilometres (12 mi) southwest of a still standing structure at Hellenikon, a common tomb for soldiers who died in a legendary struggle for the throne of Argos and another that he was told was the tomb of Argives killed in a battle around 669/8 BC. Neither survives and no evidence indicates that they resembled Egyptian pyramids.

At least two surviving pyramid-like structures are available to study, one at Hellenikon and the other at Ligourio/Ligurio, a village near the ancient theatre Epidaurus. These buildings have inwardly sloping walls, but bear no other resemblance to Egyptian pyramids. They had large central rooms (unlike Egyptian pyramids) and the Hellenikon structure is rectangular rather than square, 12.5 by 14 metres (41 by 46 ft) which means that the sides could not have met at a point. The stone used to build these structures was limestone quarried locally and was cut to fit, not into freestanding blocks like the Great Pyramid of Giza.

These structures were dated from pot shards excavated from the floor and grounds. The latest estimates are around the 5th and 4th centuries. Normally this technique is used for dating pottery, but researchers used it to try to date stone flakes from the structure walls. This launched debate about whether or not these structures are actually older than Egypt, part of the Black Athena controversy.

Lefkowitz criticised this research, suggesting that some of the research was done not to determine the reliability of the dating method, as was suggested, but to back up a claim and to make points about pyramids and Greek civilization. She claimed that not only were the results imprecise, but that other structures mentioned in the research are not in fact pyramids, e.g. a tomb alleged to be the tomb of Amphion and Zethus near Thebes, a structure at Stylidha (Thessaly) which is a long wall, etc. She pushed the possibility that the stones that were dated might have been recycled from earlier constructions. She claimed that earlier research from the 1930s, confirmed in the 1980s by Fracchia, was ignored.

Liritzis responded that Lefkowitz failed to understand and misinterpreted the methodology.

==== Poland ====
Kuyavian Pyramids, known as Kuyavian Mounds, Graves of Giants or Polish Pyramids – enormous tombs, megalithic structures in Kuyavia, Poland.

==== Spain ====
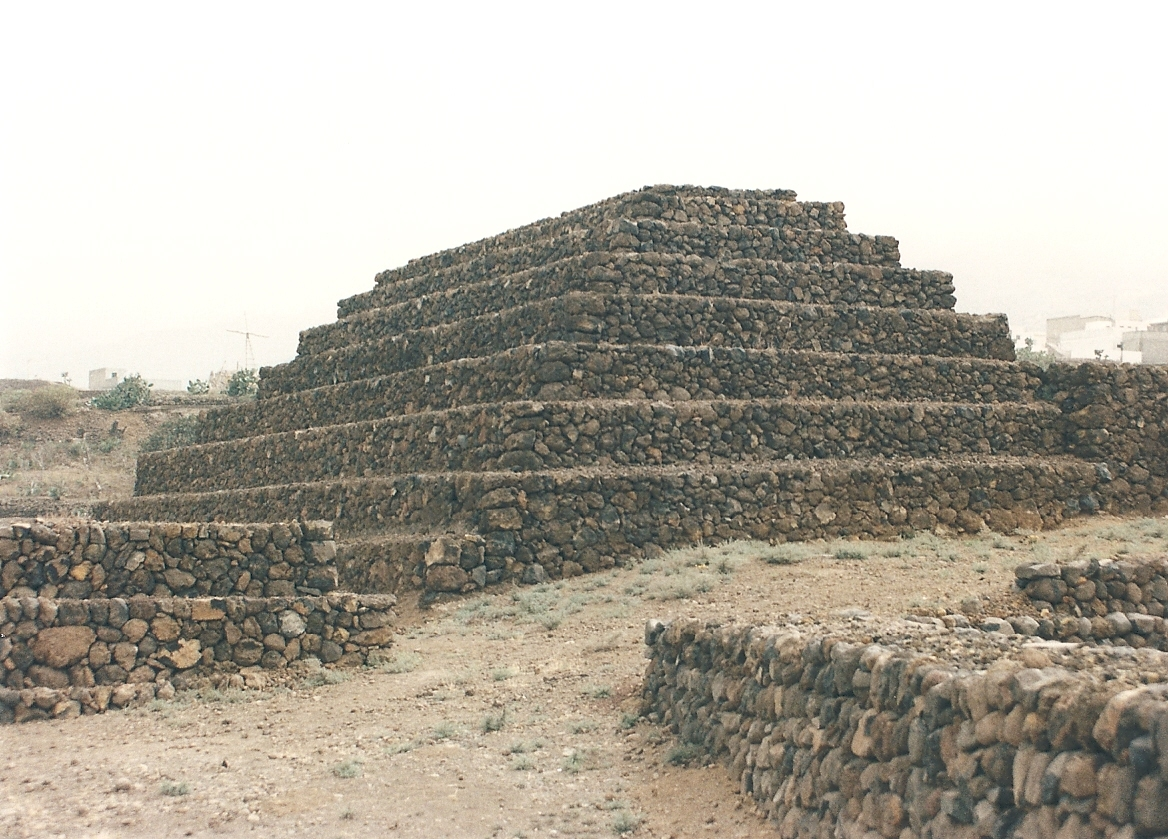
Pyramids of Güímar, Tenerife, Spain

The Pyramids of Güímar are six rectangular pyramid-shaped, terraced structures, built from lava without mortar. They are located in the district of Chacona, part of the town of Güímar on the island of Tenerife in the Canary Islands. The structures were dated to the 19th century and their function explained as a byproduct of contemporary agricultural techniques.

Autochthonous Guanche traditions as well as surviving images indicate that similar structures (also known as, "Morras", "Majanos", "Molleros", or "Paredones") were built in many locations on the island. However, over time they were dismantled and used as building material. Güímar hostred nine pyramids, only six of which survive.

==== Roman Empire ====
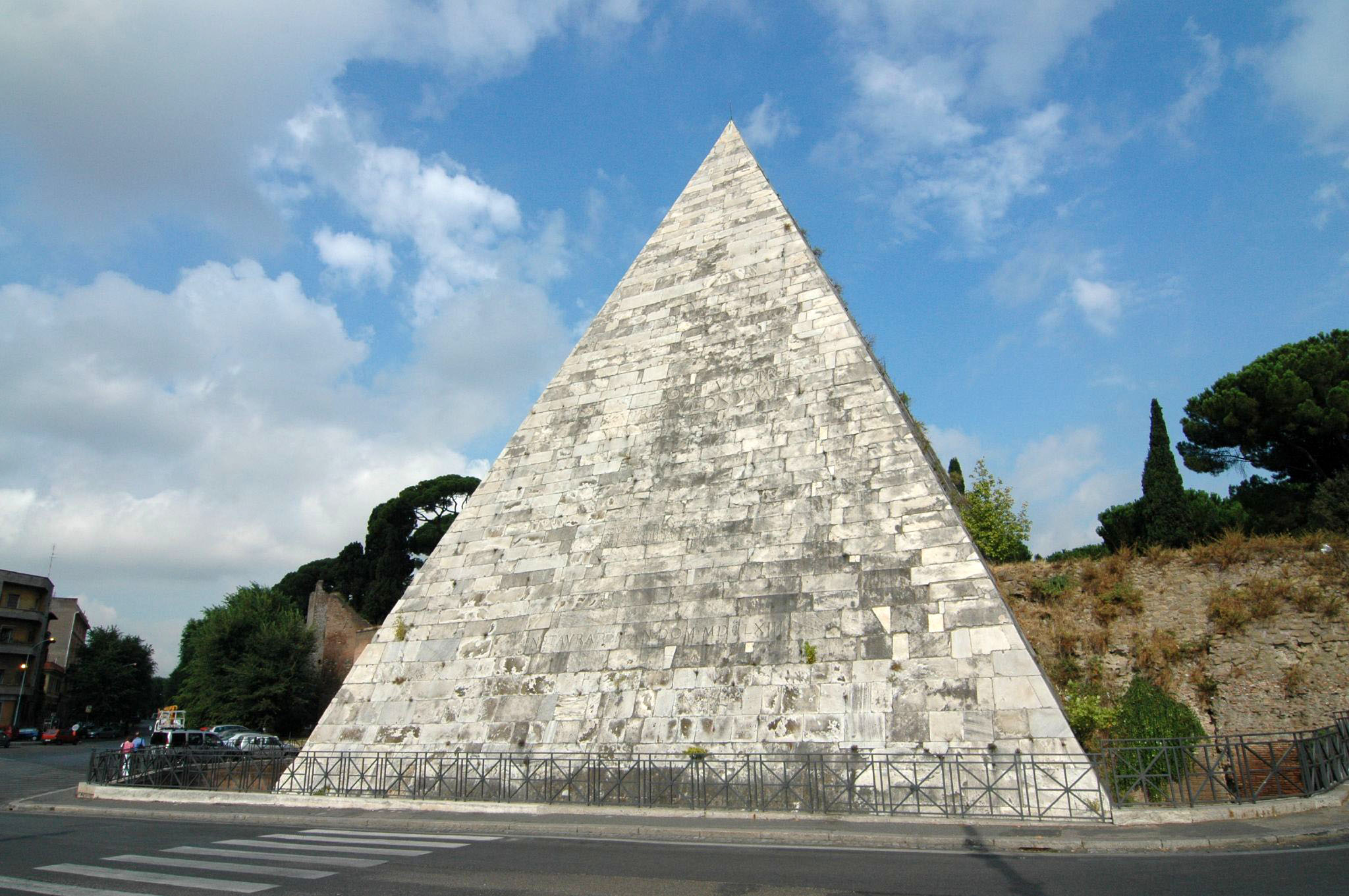
Pyramid of Cestius in Rome, Italy

The 27-metre-high Pyramid of Cestius was built by the end of the 1st century BC and survives close to the Porta San Paolo. Another, named Meta Romuli, stood in the Ager Vaticanus (today's Borgo), but was destroyed at the end of the 15th century.

==== Medieval Europe ====
Pyramids were occasionally used in Christian architecture during the feudal era, e.g. as the tower of Oviedo's Gothic Cathedral of San Salvador.

=== Americas ===
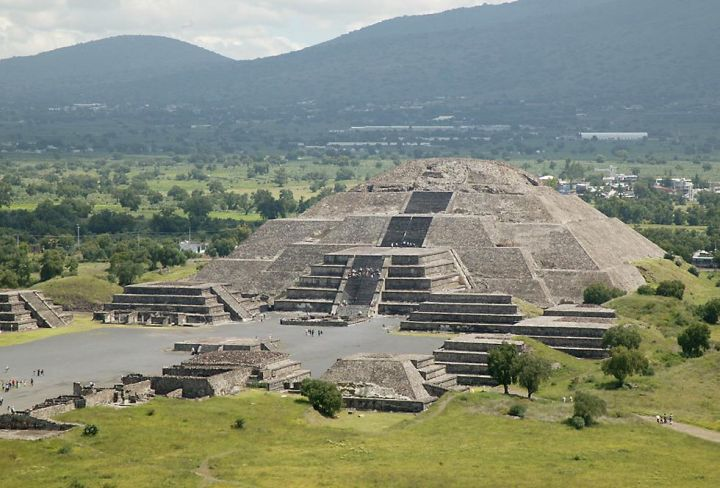
Pyramid of the Moon, Teotihuacan, built between 100 and 450 AD

==== Peru ====
Andean cultures used pyramids in various architectural structures such as the ones in Caral, Túcume and Chavín de Huantar, constructed around the same time as early Egyptian pyramids.

==== Mesoamerica ====
El Castillo at Chichen Itza

Several Mesoamerican cultures built pyramid-shaped structures. Mesoamerican pyramids were usually stepped, with temples on top, more similar to the Mesopotamian ziggurat than the Egyptian pyramid.

The largest by volume is the Great Pyramid of Cholula, in the Mexican state of Puebla. Constructed from the 3rd century BC to the 9th century AD, this pyramid is the world's largest monument, and is still not fully excavated. The third largest pyramid in the world, the Pyramid of the Sun, at Teotihuacan, is also located in Mexico. An unusual pyramid with a circular plan survives at the site of Cuicuilco, now inside Mexico City and mostly covered with lava from an eruption of the Xitle Volcano in the 1st century BC. Several circular stepped pyramids called Guachimontones survive in Teuchitlán, Jalisco.

Pyramids in Mexico were often used for human sacrifice. Harner stated that for the dedication of the Great Pyramid of Tenochtitlan in 1487, "one source states 20,000, another 72,344, and several give 80,400" as the number of humans sacrificed.

==== United States ====
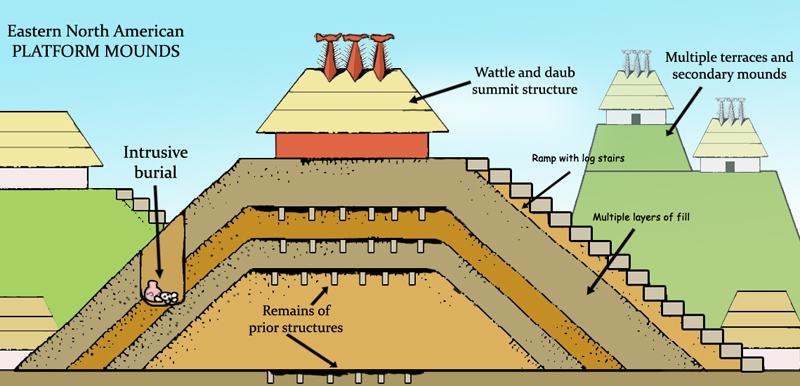
A diagram showing the various components of Eastern North American platform mounds

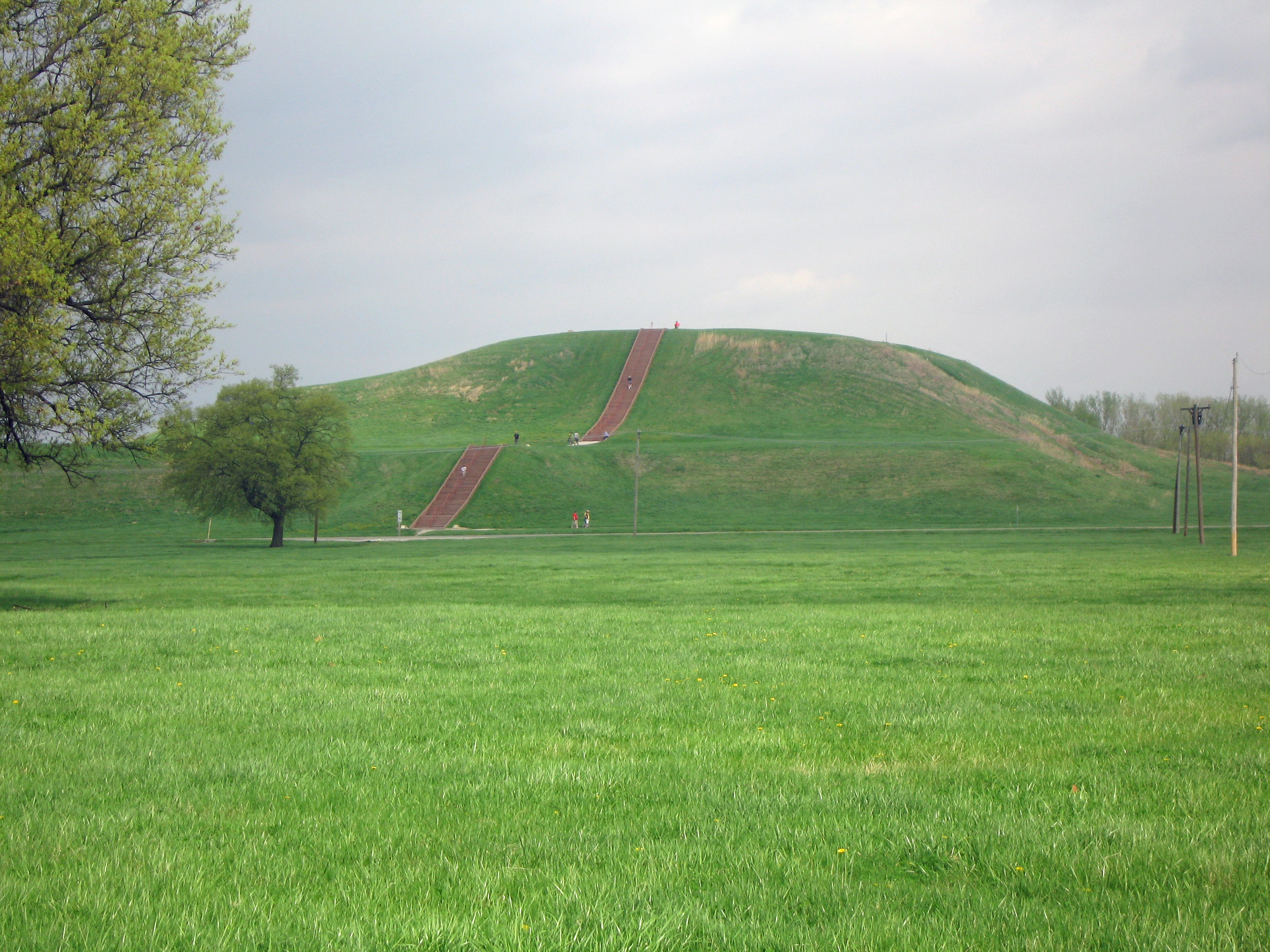
Monks Mound, Cahokia

Many pre-Columbian Native American societies of ancient North America built large pyramidal earth structures known as platform mounds. Among the largest and best-known of these structures is Monks Mound at the site of Cahokia in what became Illinois, completed around 1100 AD. It has a base larger than that of the Great Pyramid. Many mounds underwent repeated episodes of expansion. They are believed to have played a central role in the mound-building peoples' religious life. Documented uses include semi-public chief's house platforms, public temple platforms, mortuary platforms, charnel house platforms, earth lodge/town house platforms, residence platforms, square ground and rotunda platforms, and dance platforms. Cultures that built substructure mounds include the Troyville culture, Coles Creek culture, Plaquemine culture and Mississippian cultures.

=== Asia ===
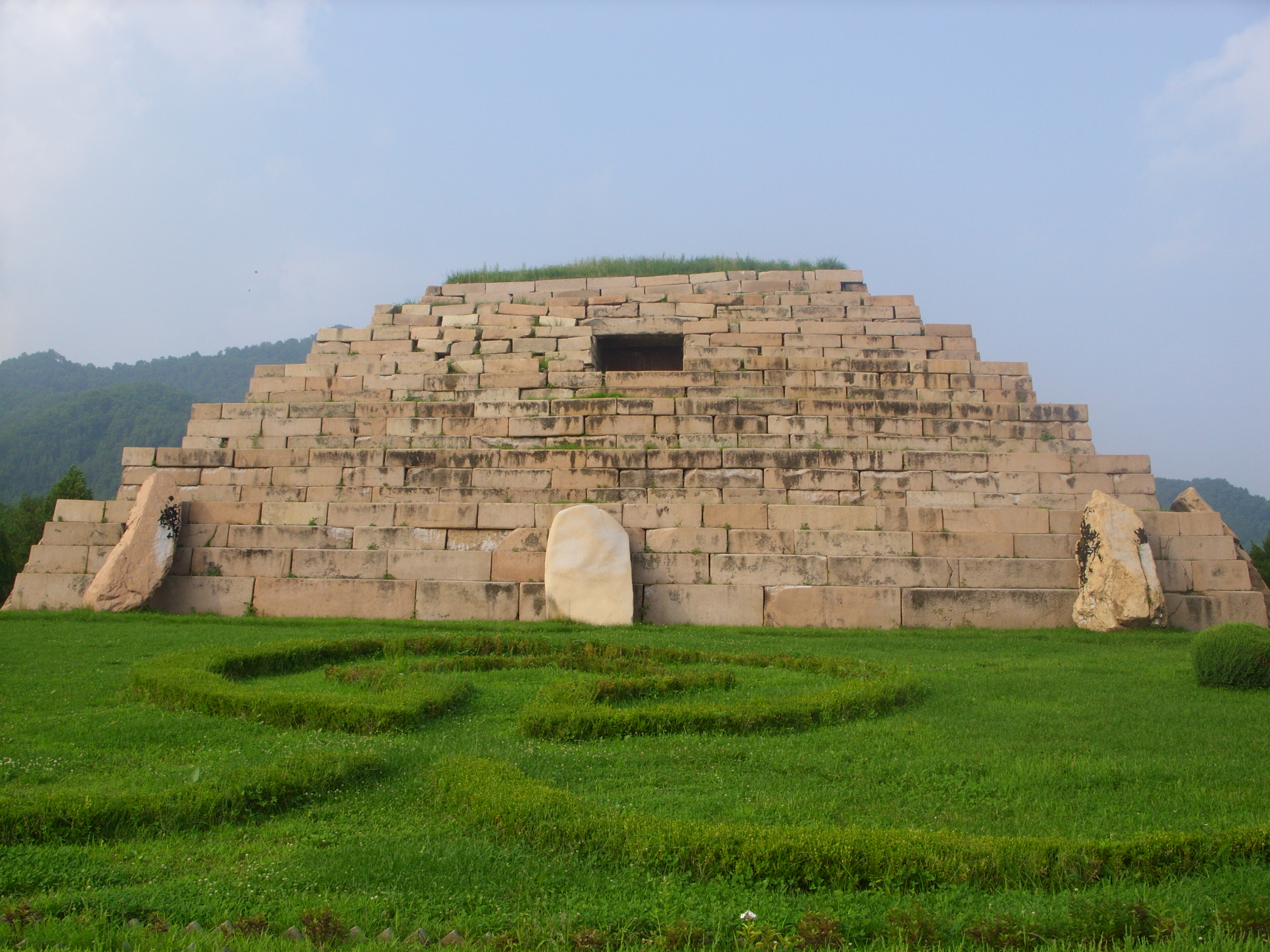
Ancient Korean tomb in Ji'an, Northeastern China

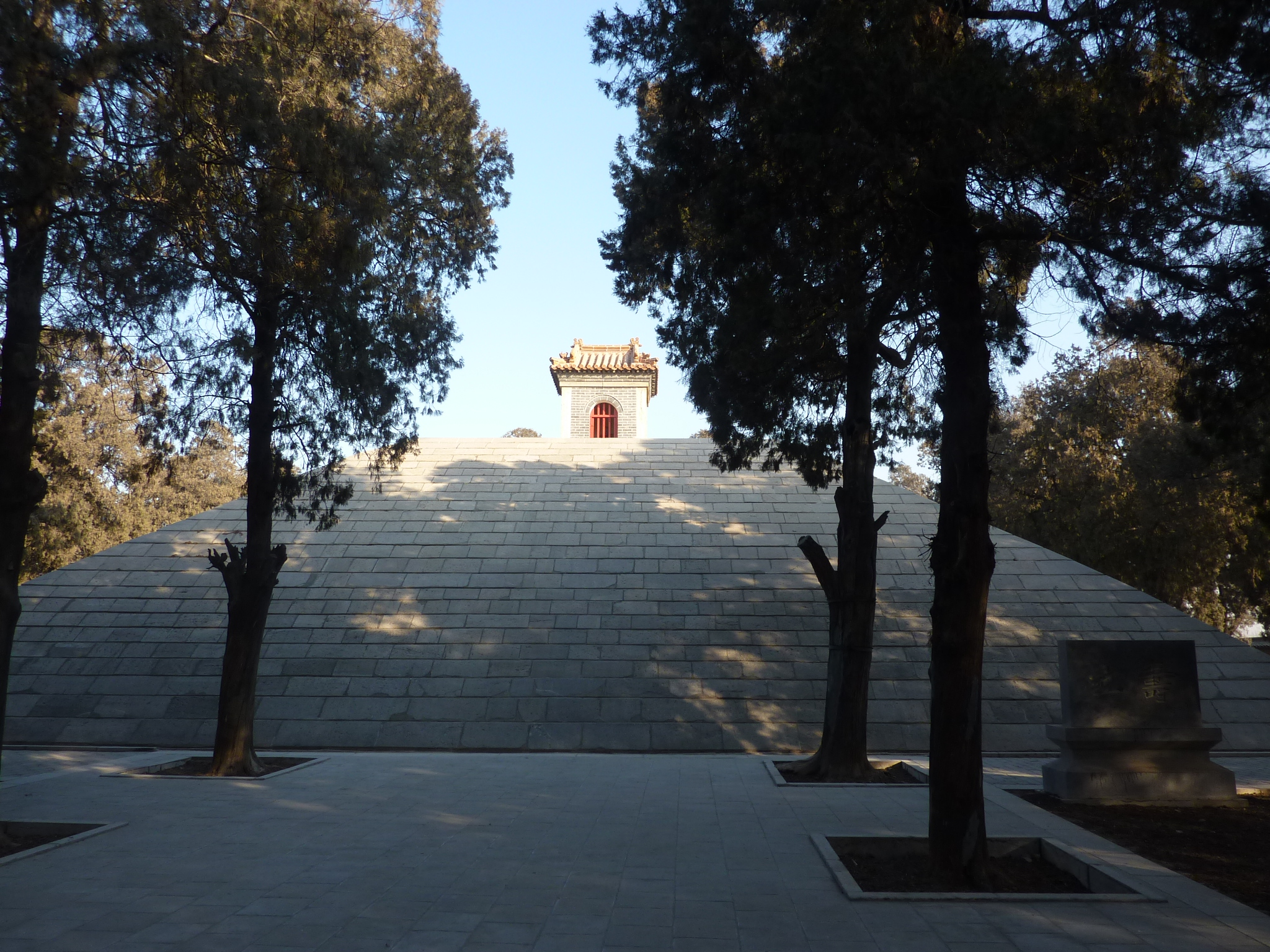
Shaohao Tomb, Qufu, China

Many square flat-topped mound tombs in China. The first emperor Qin Shi Huang (c. 221 BC, who unified the seven pre-imperial kingdoms) was buried under a large mound outside modern-day Xi'an. In the following centuries about a dozen more Han dynasty royal persons were also buried under flat-topped pyramidal earthworks.

==== India ====
Numerous giant, granite, temple pyramids were built in South India during the Chola Empire, many of which remain in use. Examples include Brihadisvara Temple at Thanjavur, Brihadisvara Temple at Gangaikonda Cholapuram, and the Airavatesvara Temple at Darasuram. However, the largest temple (area) is the Ranganathaswamy Temple in Srirangam, Tamil Nadu. The Thanjavur temple was built by Raja Raja Chola in the 11th century. The Brihadisvara Temple was declared a World Heritage Site by UNESCO in 1987; the Temple of Gangaikondacholapuram and the Airavatesvara Temple at Darasuram were added in 2004.

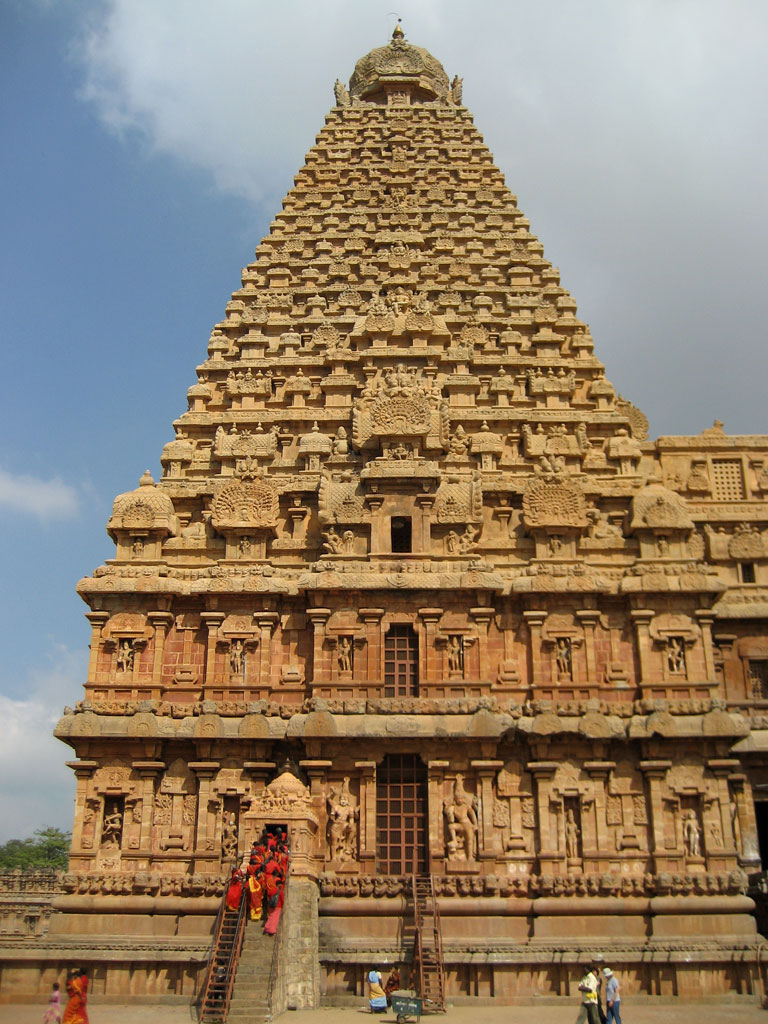
The granite gopuram (tower) of Brihadeeswarar Temple, 1010 AD.

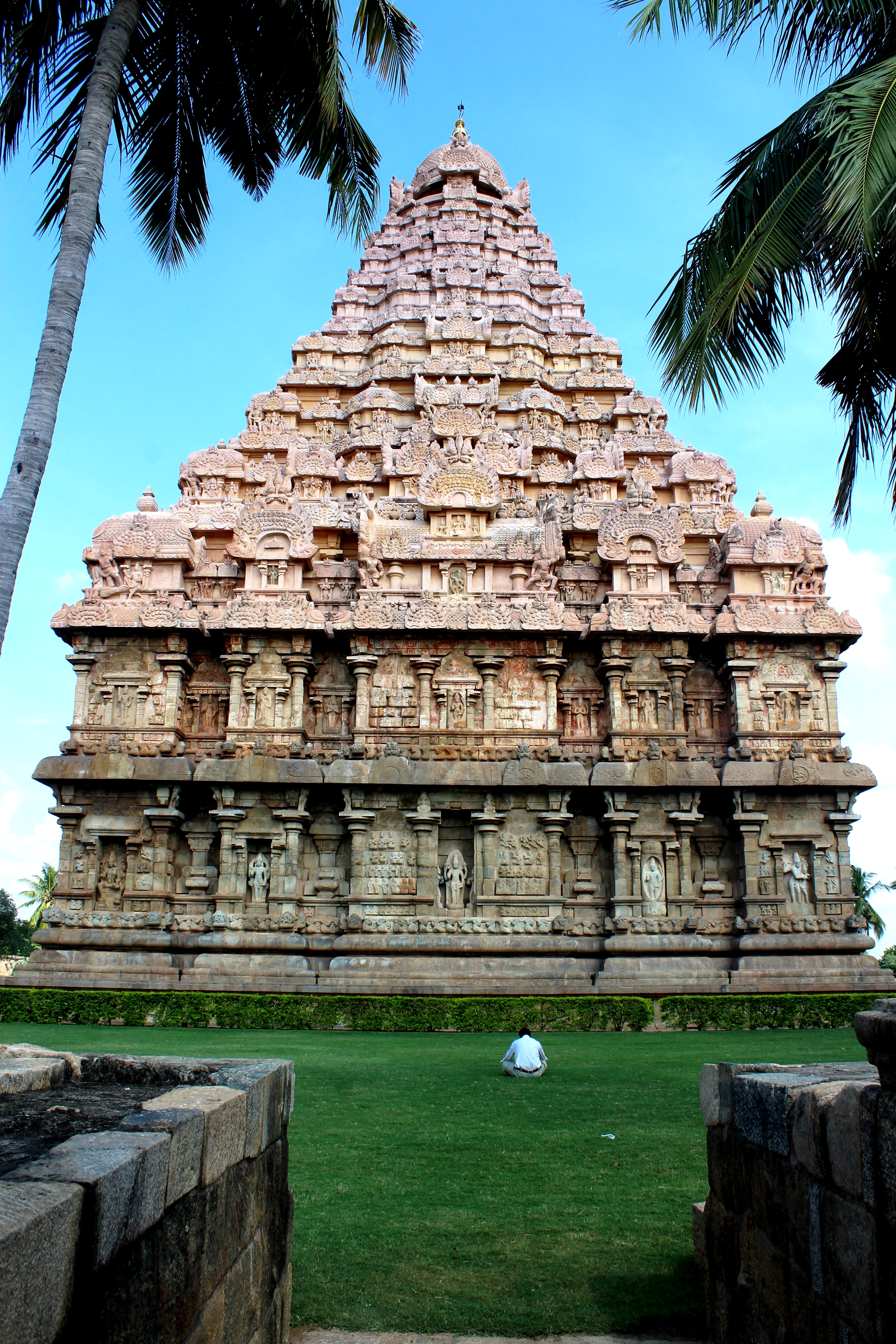
The pyramidal structure above the sanctum at Brihadisvara Temple.

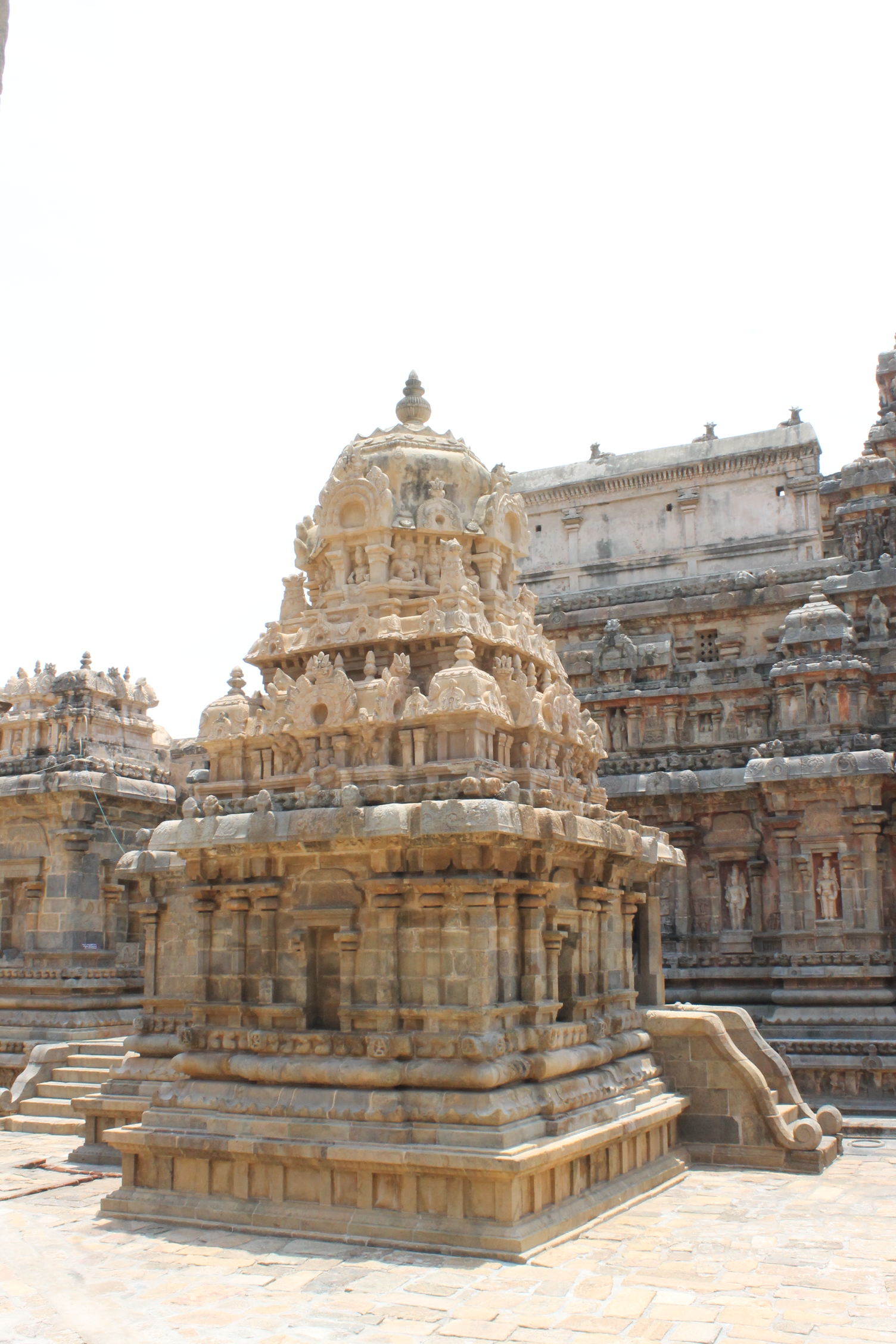
Pyramid-structure inside Airavatesvara Temple.

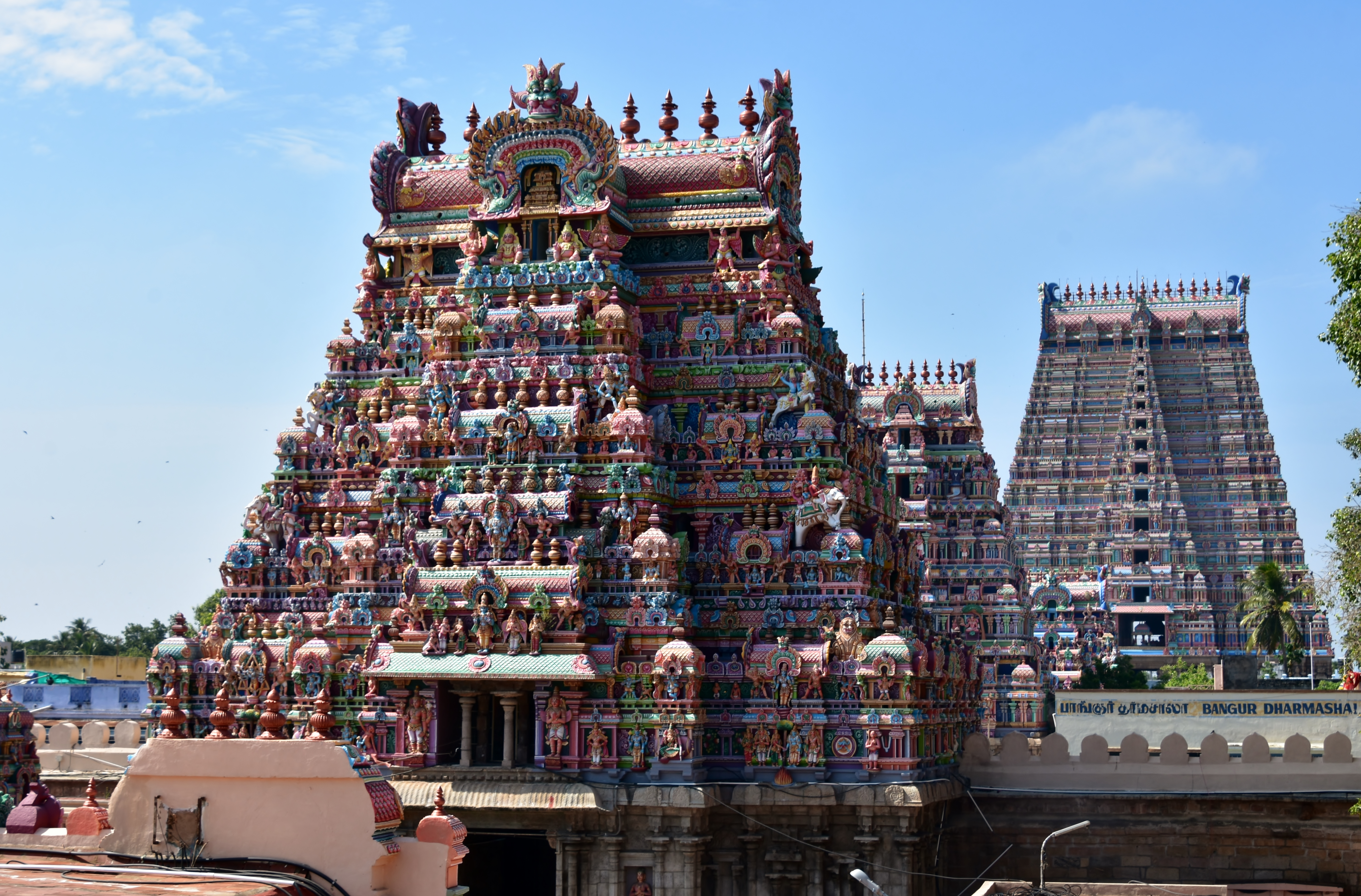
Ranganathaswamy Temple gopurams at Srirangam dedicated to Ranganatha, a reclining form of the Hindu deity Maha Vishnu.

==== Indonesia ====
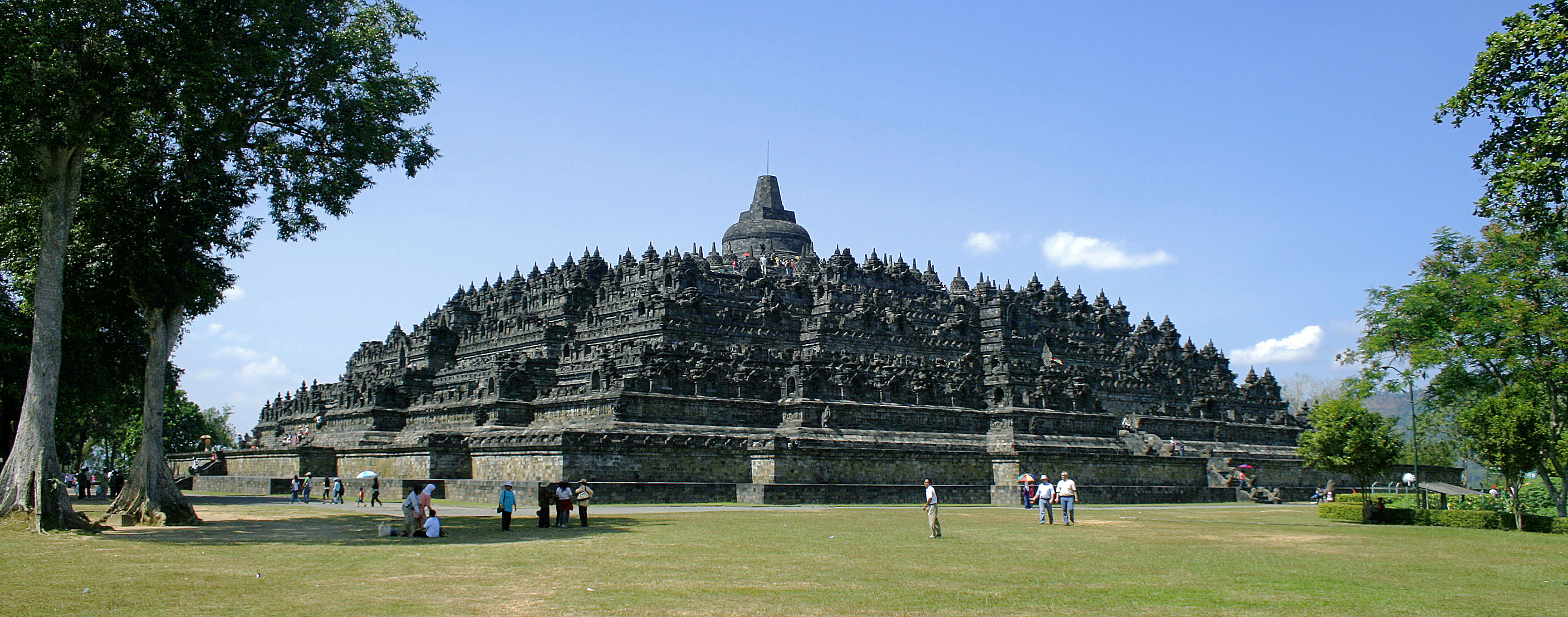
Borobudur, Central Java, Indonesia

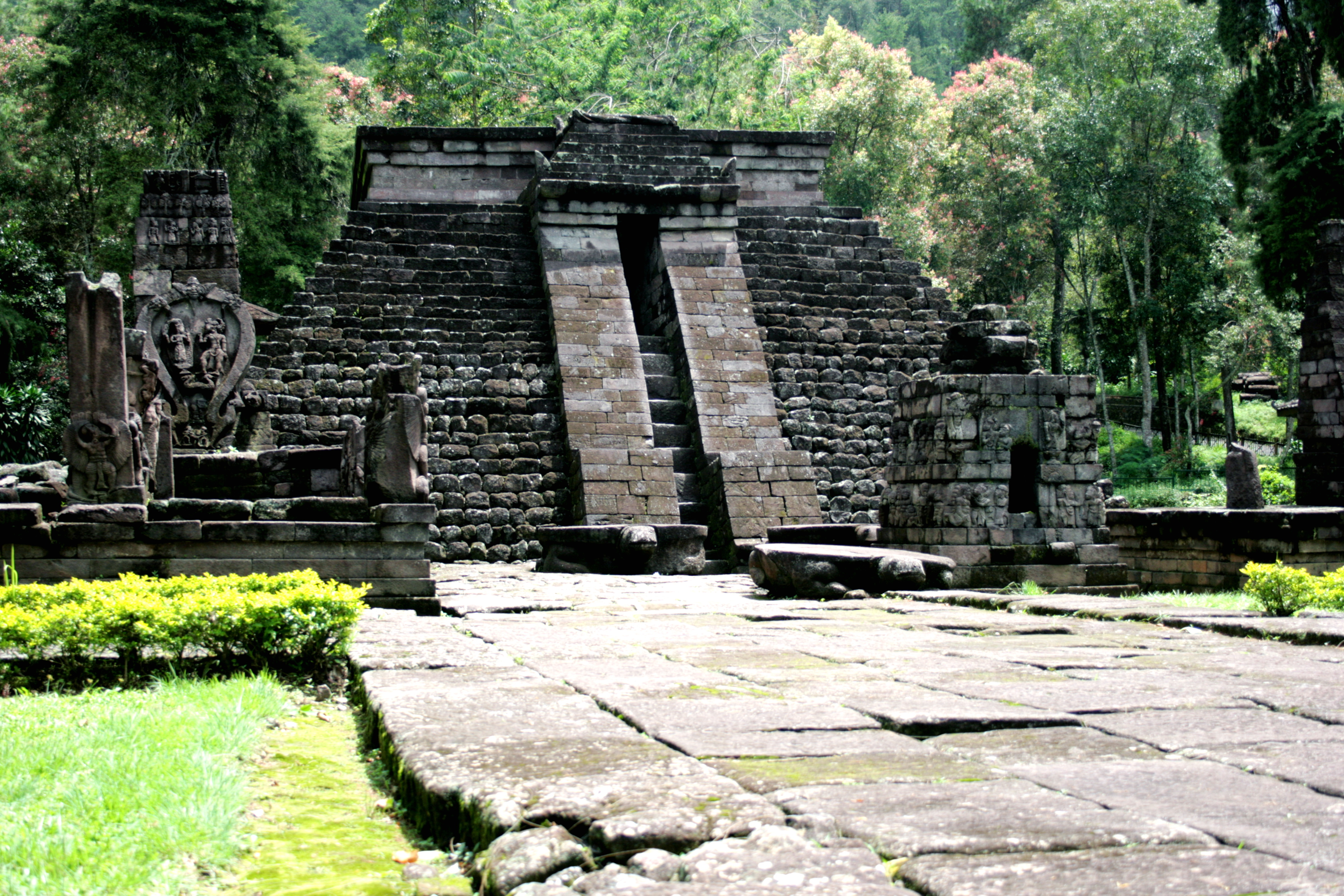
Candi Sukuh in Java, Indonesia

Austronesian megalithic culture in Indonesia featured earth and stone step pyramid structures called punden berundak. These were discovered in Pangguyangan near Cisolok and in Cipari near Kuningan. The stone pyramids were based on beliefs that mountains and high places were the abode for the spirit of the ancestors.

The step pyramid is the basic design of the 8th century Borobudur Buddhist monument in Central Java. However later Java temples were influenced by Indian Hindu architecture, as exemplified by the spires of Prambanan temple. In the 15th century, during late Majapahit period, Java saw the revival of indigenous Austronesian elements as displayed by Sukuh temple that somewhat resemble Mesoamerican pyramids, and also stepped pyramids of Mount Penanggungan.

==== East Asia, Southeast Asia and Central Asia ====
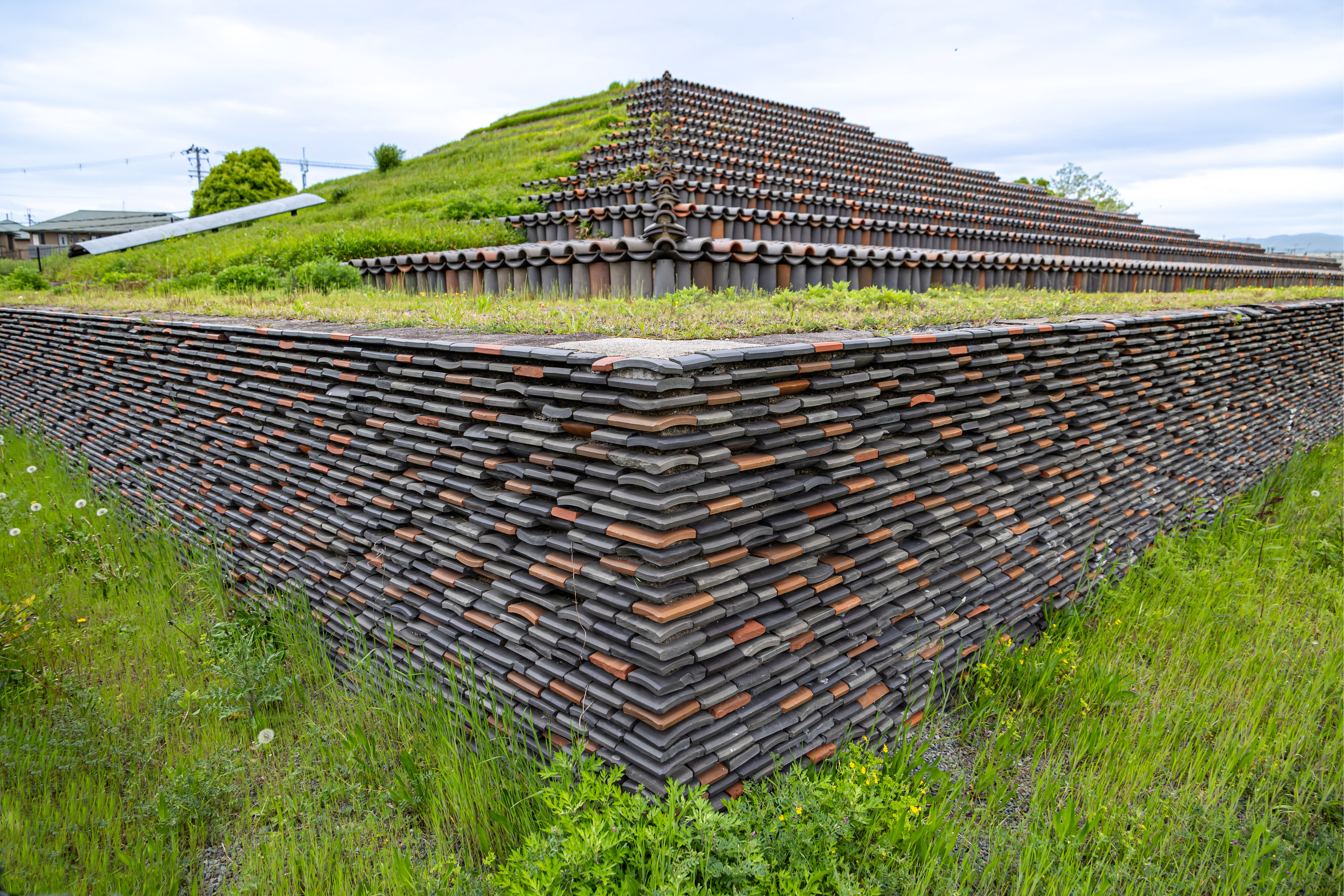
Dotō, Stupa of Ōno-dera Temple, Sakai, Osaka Prefecture, Japan

In east Asia, Buddhist stupas were usually represented as tall pagodas. However, some pyramidal stupas survive. One theory is that these pyramids were inspired by the Borobudur monument through Sumatran and Javanese monks. A similar Buddhist monument survives in Vrang, Tajikistan. At least nine Buddhist step pyramids survive, 4 from former Gyeongsang Province of Korea, 3 from Japan, 1 from Indonesia (Borobudur) and 1 from Tajikistan.

=== Oceania ===
Several pyramids were erected throughout the Pacific islands, such as Puʻukoholā Heiau in Hawaii, the Pulemelei Mound in Samoa, and Nan Madol in Pohnpei.

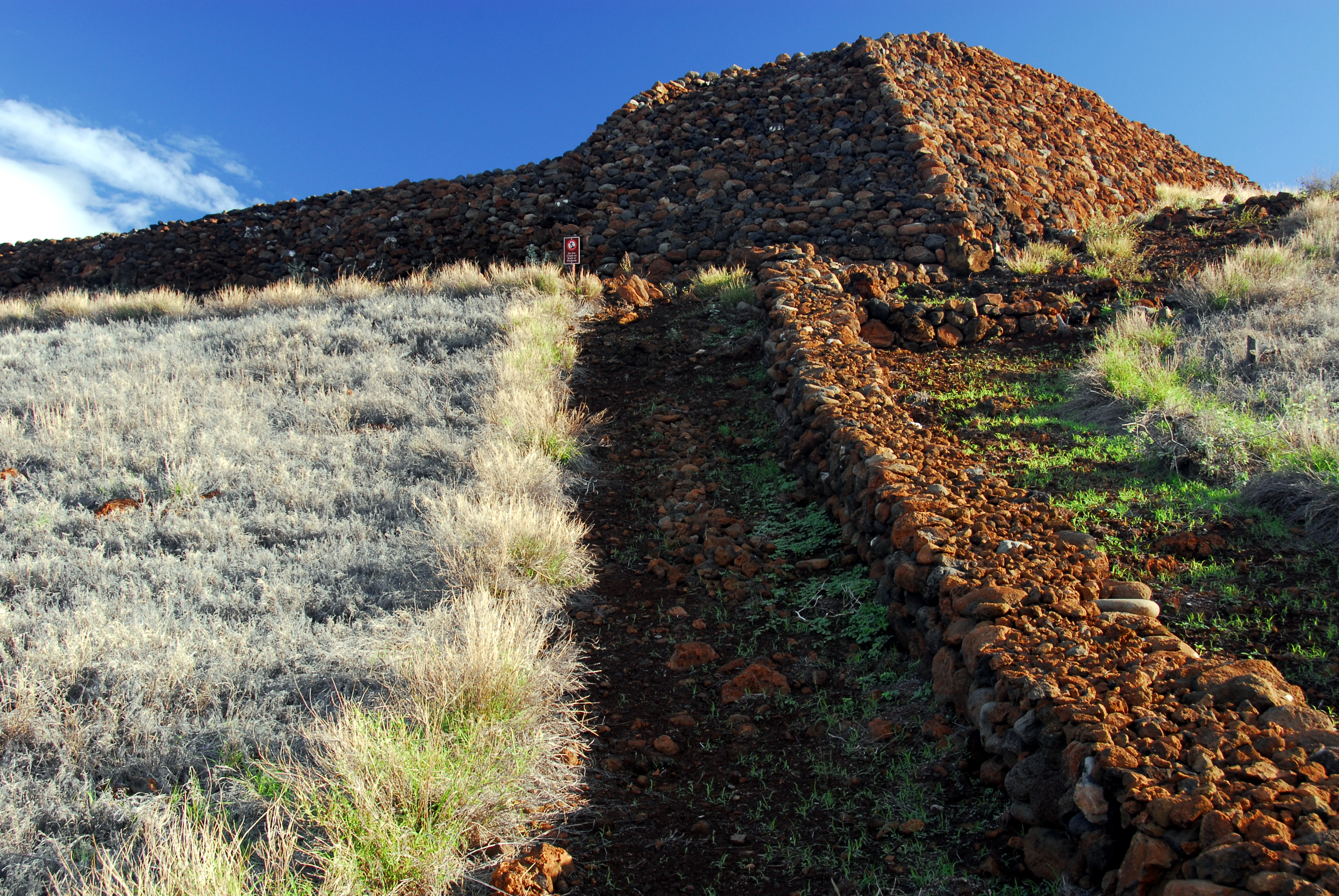
Puʻukoholā Heiau National Historic Site, Hawaii, United States.

== Modern pyramids ==
Comparison of approximate profiles of several notable pyramidal or near-pyramidal buildings. Dotted lines indicate original heights, where data is available. In its SVG file, hover over a pyramid to highlight and click for its article.

- Two pyramid-shaped tombs were erected in Maudlin's Cemetery, Ireland, c. 1840, belonging to the De Burgh family.

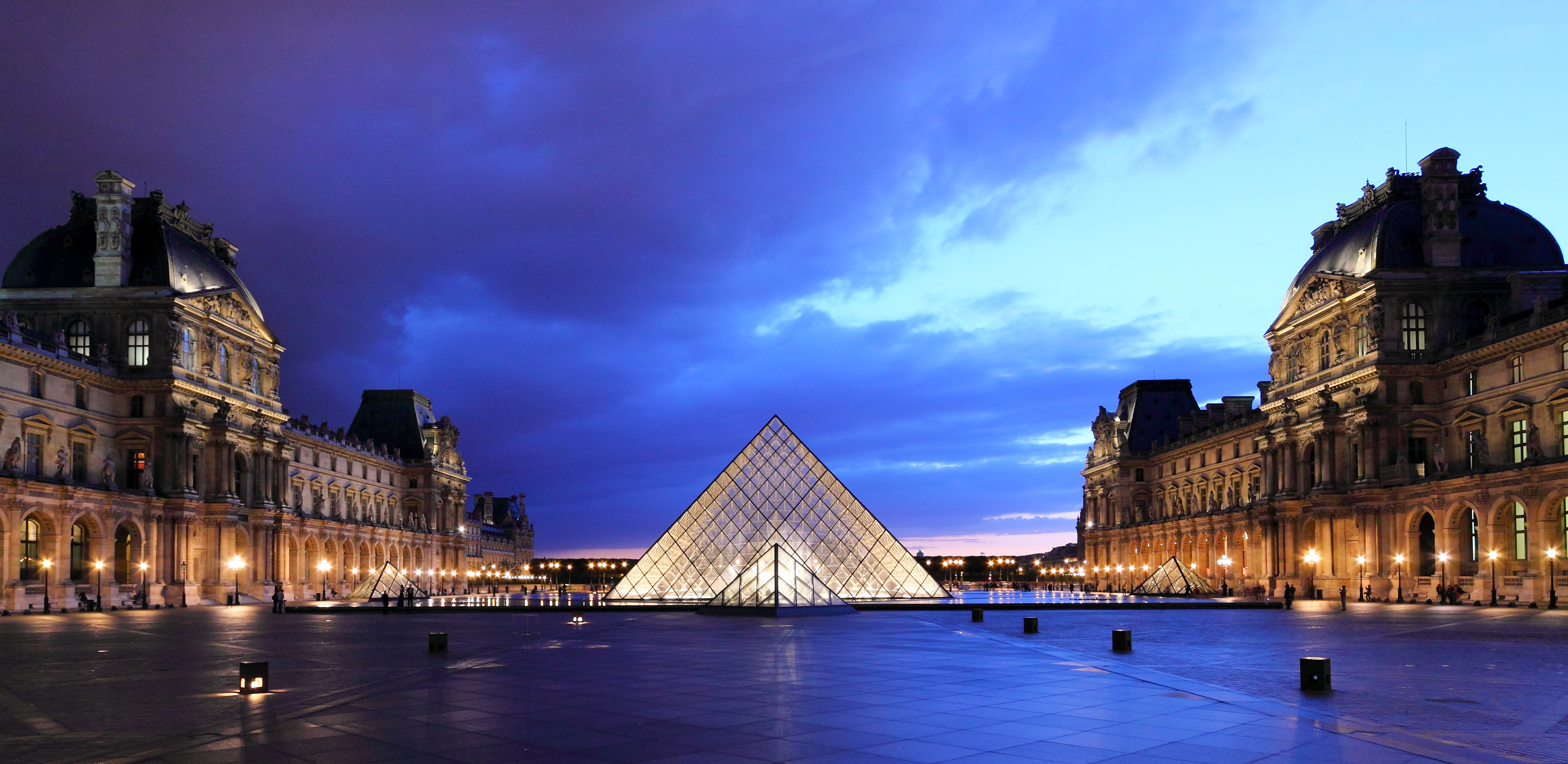
Louvre Pyramid (Paris, France)

- The Louvre Pyramid in Paris, France, in the court of the Louvre Museum, is a 20.6 metre (about 70 foot) glass structure that acts as a museum entrance. It was designed by American architect I. M. Pei and completed in 1989. The Pyramide Inversée (Inverted Pyramid) is displayed in the underground Louvre shopping mall.
- The Tama-Re village was an Egyptian-themed set of buildings and monuments built near Eatonton, Georgia by Nuwaubians in 1993 that was mostly demolished after it was sold in 2005.

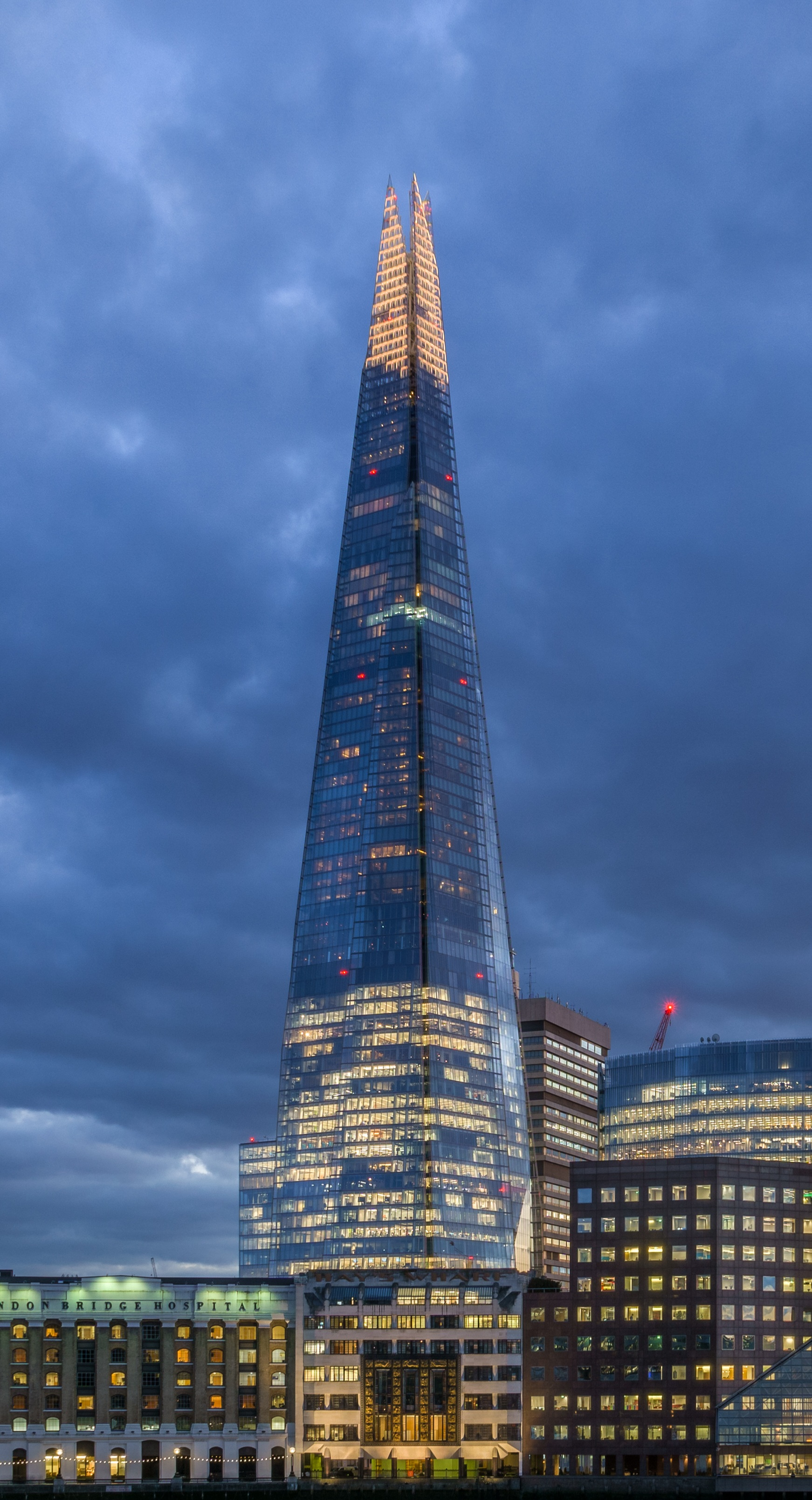
The Shard (London, United Kingdom)

- The Shard in London, at 309.6 metres (1016 feet) tall, is the tallest building in the United Kingdom and Western Europe.
- The Luxor Hotel in Las Vegas, United States, is a 30-story pyramid.
- The 32-story Memphis Pyramid (Memphis was named after the Egyptian capital whose name was derived from the name of one of its pyramids). Built in 1991, it was the home court for the University of Memphis men's basketball program, and the National Basketball Association's Memphis Grizzlies until 2004. It was not regularly used as a sports or entertainment venue after 2007, and in 2015 was re-purposed as a Bass Pro Shops megastore.
- The LBS Financial Credit Union Pyramid, home of the basketball and volleyball teams of the California State University, Long Beach, campus in California, United States, is an 18-story-tall blue true pyramid.

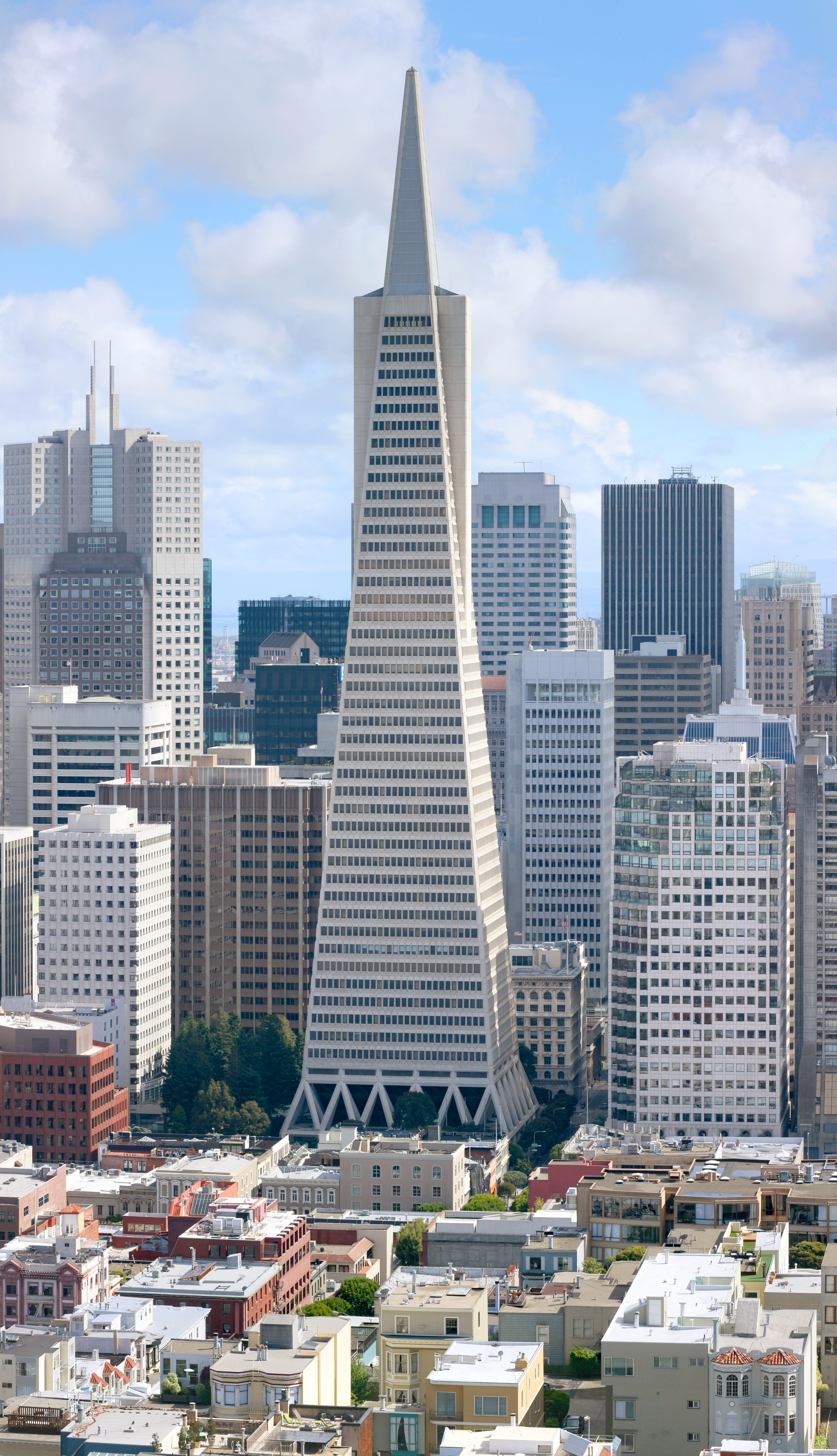
Transamerica Pyramid in San Francisco, California

- The 48-story Transamerica Pyramid in San Francisco, California, designed by William Pereira, is a city symbol.
- The 105-story Ryugyong Hotel is in Pyongyang, North Korea.
- A former museum/monument in Tirana, Albania is commonly known as the "Pyramid of Tirana". It differs from typical pyramids in having a radial rather than square or rectangular shape, and gently sloped sides that make it short in comparison to the size of its base.
- The Slovak Radio Building in Bratislava, Slovakia is an inverted pyramid.
- The Palace of Peace and Reconciliation is in Astana, Kazakhstan.
- The three pyramids of Moody Gardens are in Galveston, Texas.
- The Co-Op Bank Pyramid or Stockport Pyramid in Stockport, England is a large pyramid-shaped office block. (The surrounding part of the valley of the upper Mersey has sometimes been called the "Kings Valley" after the Egypt's Valley of the Kings.)
- The Ames Monument in southeastern Wyoming honors the brothers who financed the Union Pacific Railroad.
- The Trylon, a triangular pyramid was erected for the 1939 World's Fair in Flushing, Queens and demolished after the Fair closed.
- The Ballandean Pyramid, at Ballandean in rural Queensland is a 15-metre folly pyramid made from blocks of local granite.
- The Karlsruhe Pyramid is a pyramid made of red sandstone, located in the centre of the market square of Karlsruhe, Germany. It was erected in 1823–1825 over the vault of the city's founder, Margrave Charles III William (1679–1738).
- Muttart Conservatory greenhouses are in Edmonton, Alberta.

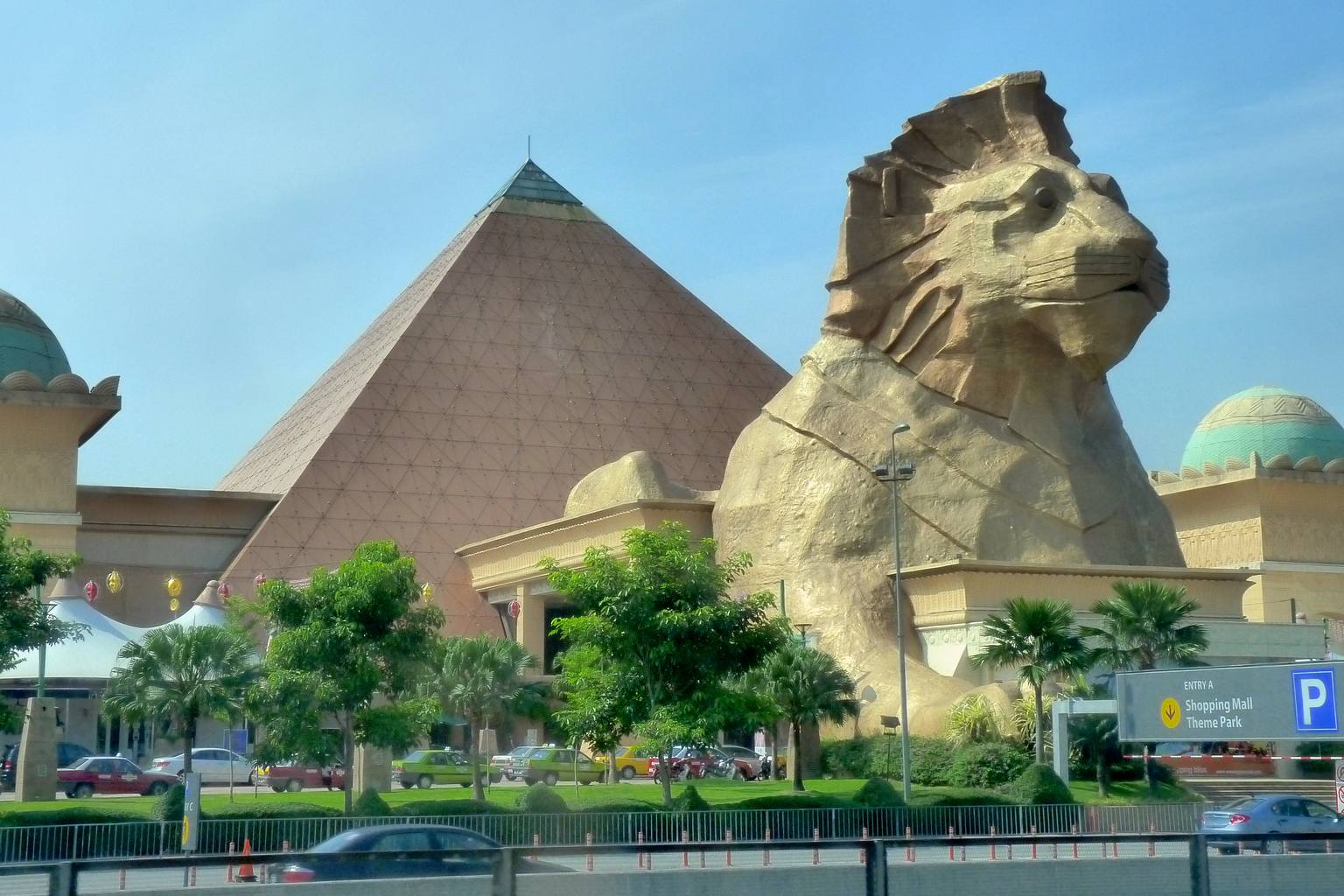
The Sunway Pyramid in Subang Jaya has an Egyptian-inspired pyramid with a lion-like sphinx.

- Sunway Pyramid shopping mall is in Selangor, Malaysia.
- Hanoi Museum has an overall design of a reversed pyramid.
- The Ha! Ha! Pyramid by artist Jean-Jules Soucy in La Baie, Quebec is made out of 3,000 give way signs.
- The Pyramid culture-entertainment complex and Monument of the Kazan siege is in Kazan, Russia.
- The Time pyramid in Wemding, Germany is a pyramid begun in 1993 and scheduled for completion in the year 3183.
- Triangle is a skyscraper under construction in Paris.
- The Shimizu Mega-City Pyramid is a proposed project for construction of a massive pyramid over Tokyo Bay in Japan.
- The Donkin Memorial was erected on a Xhosa reserve in 1820 by Cape Governor Sir Rufane Shaw Donkin in memory of his late wife Elizabeth, in Port Elizabeth, South Africa. The pyramid is used in many different coats-of-arms associated with Port Elizabeth.

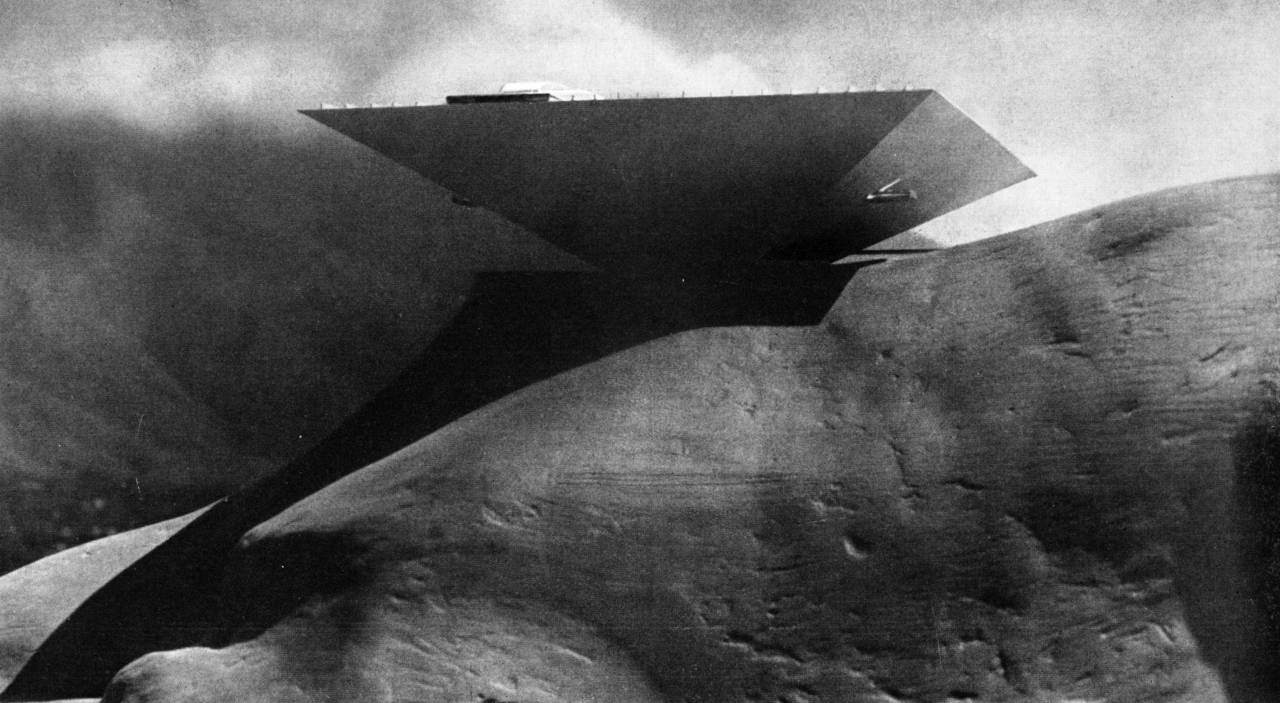
Oscar Niemeyer's design for a museum in Caracas

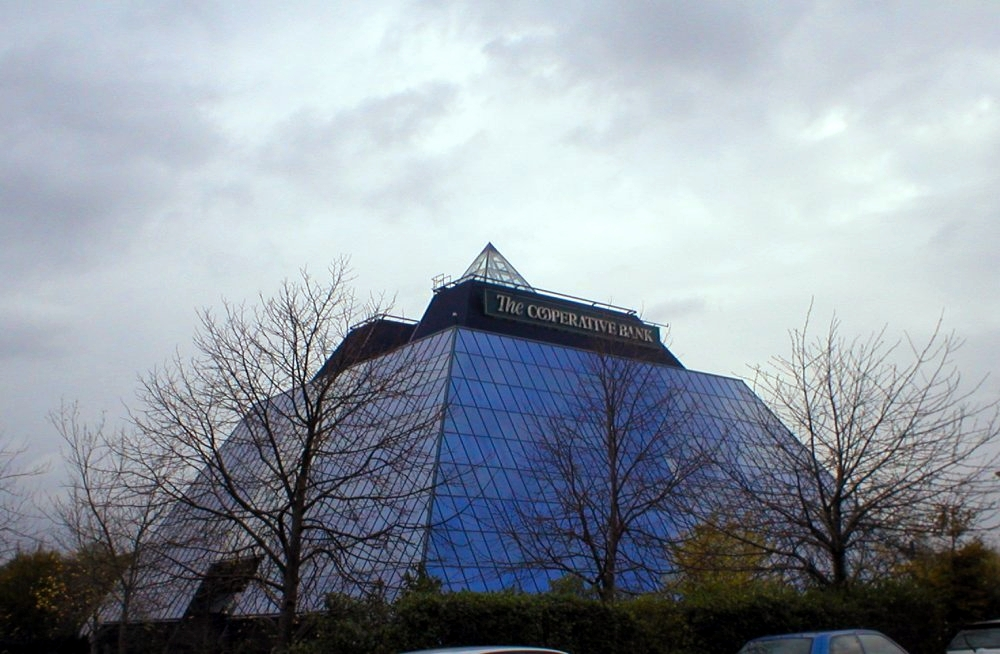
Stockport Pyramid in Stockport, United Kingdom

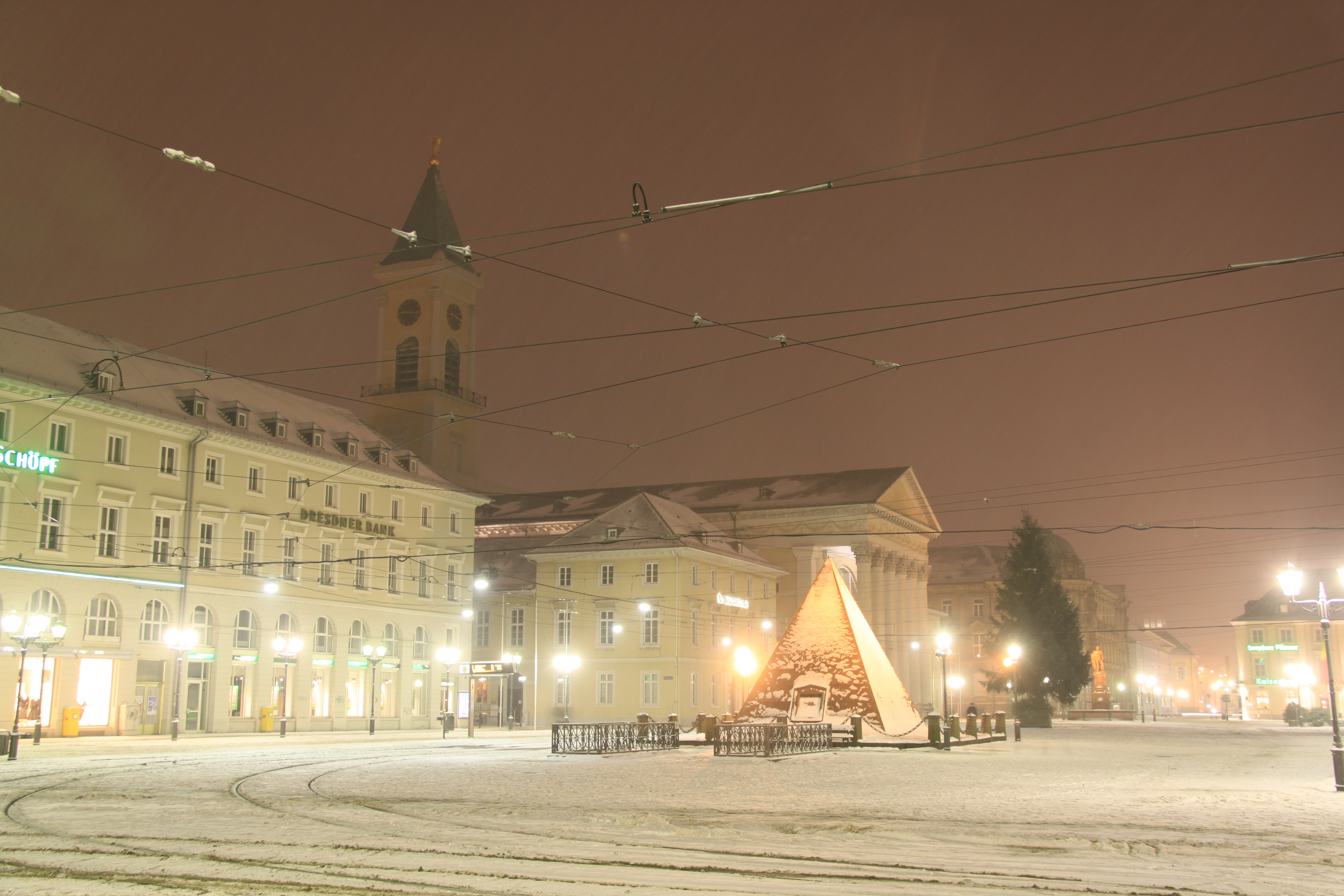
Karlsruhe Pyramid, Germany

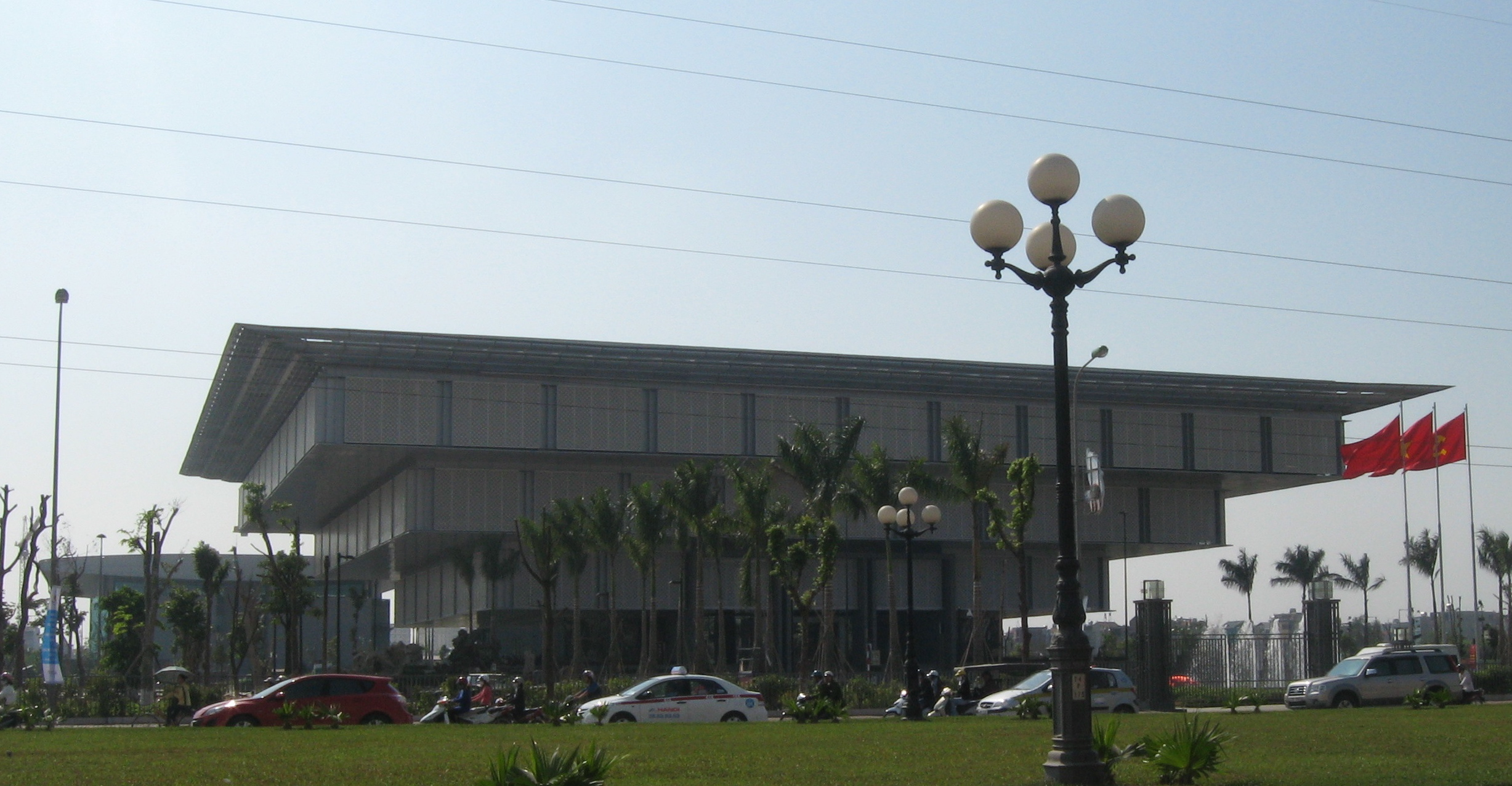
Hanoi Museum in Vietnam features an inverted pyramid shape.

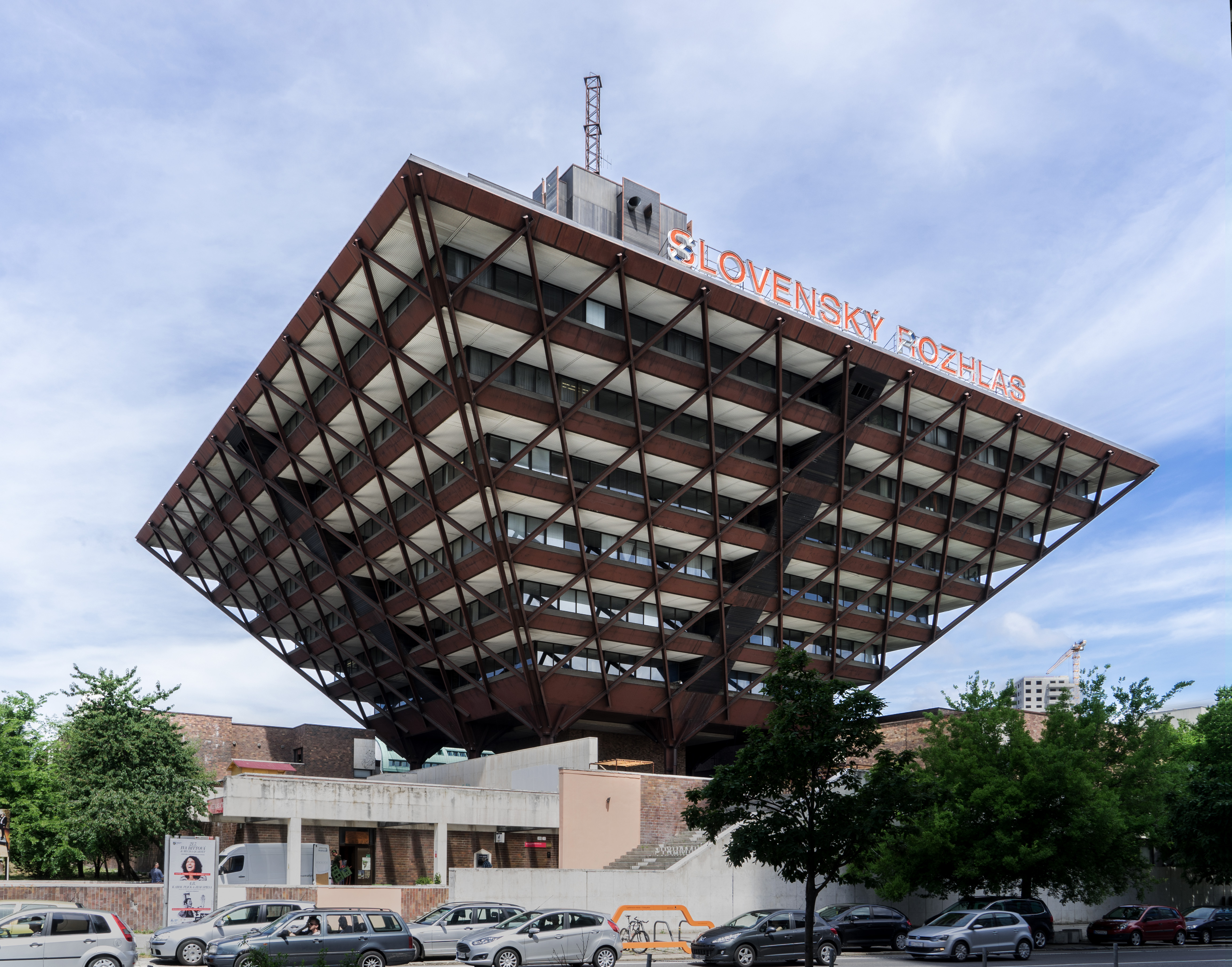
Slovak Radio Building, Bratislava, Slovakia.

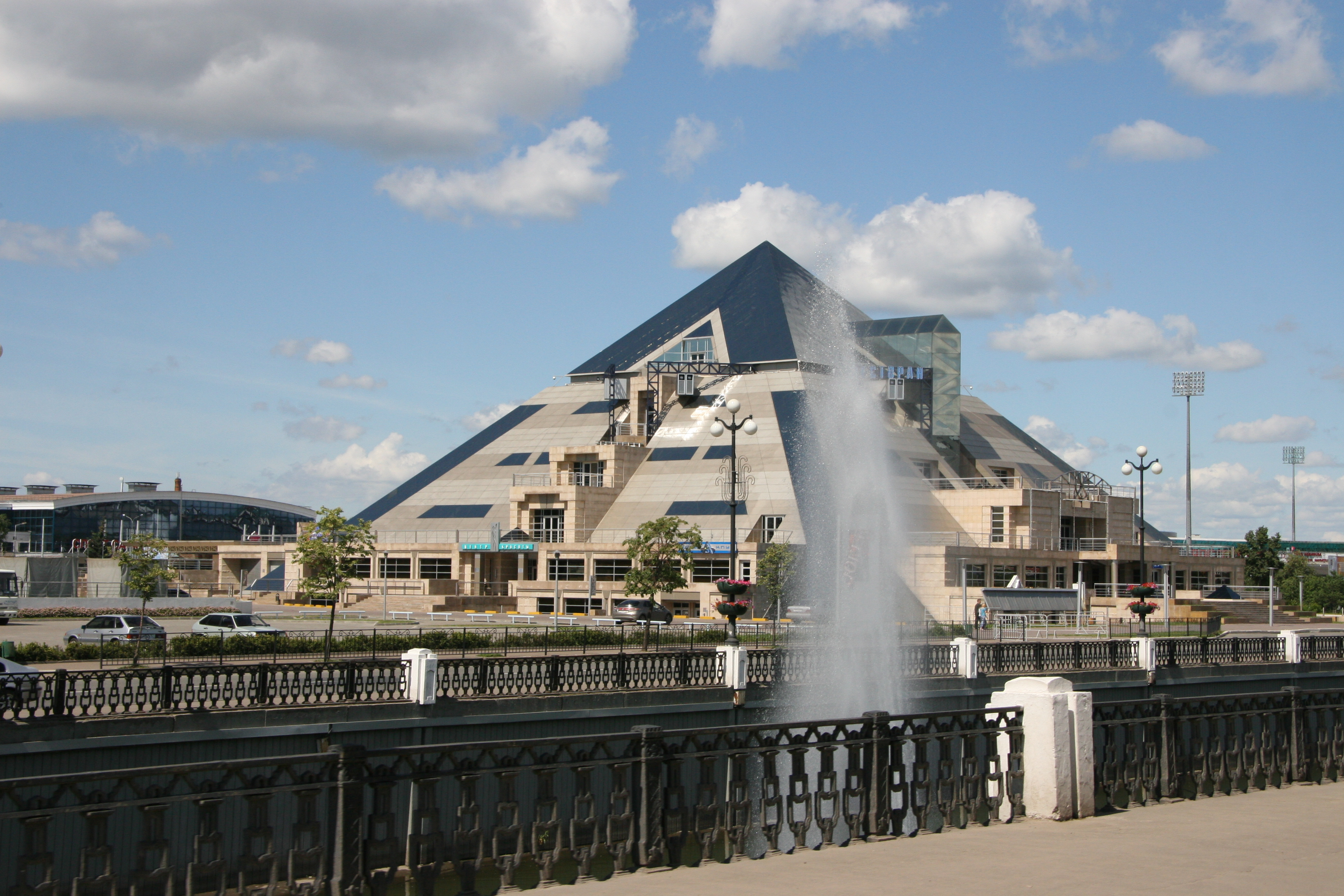
"Pyramid" culture-entertainment complex in Kazan, Russia.

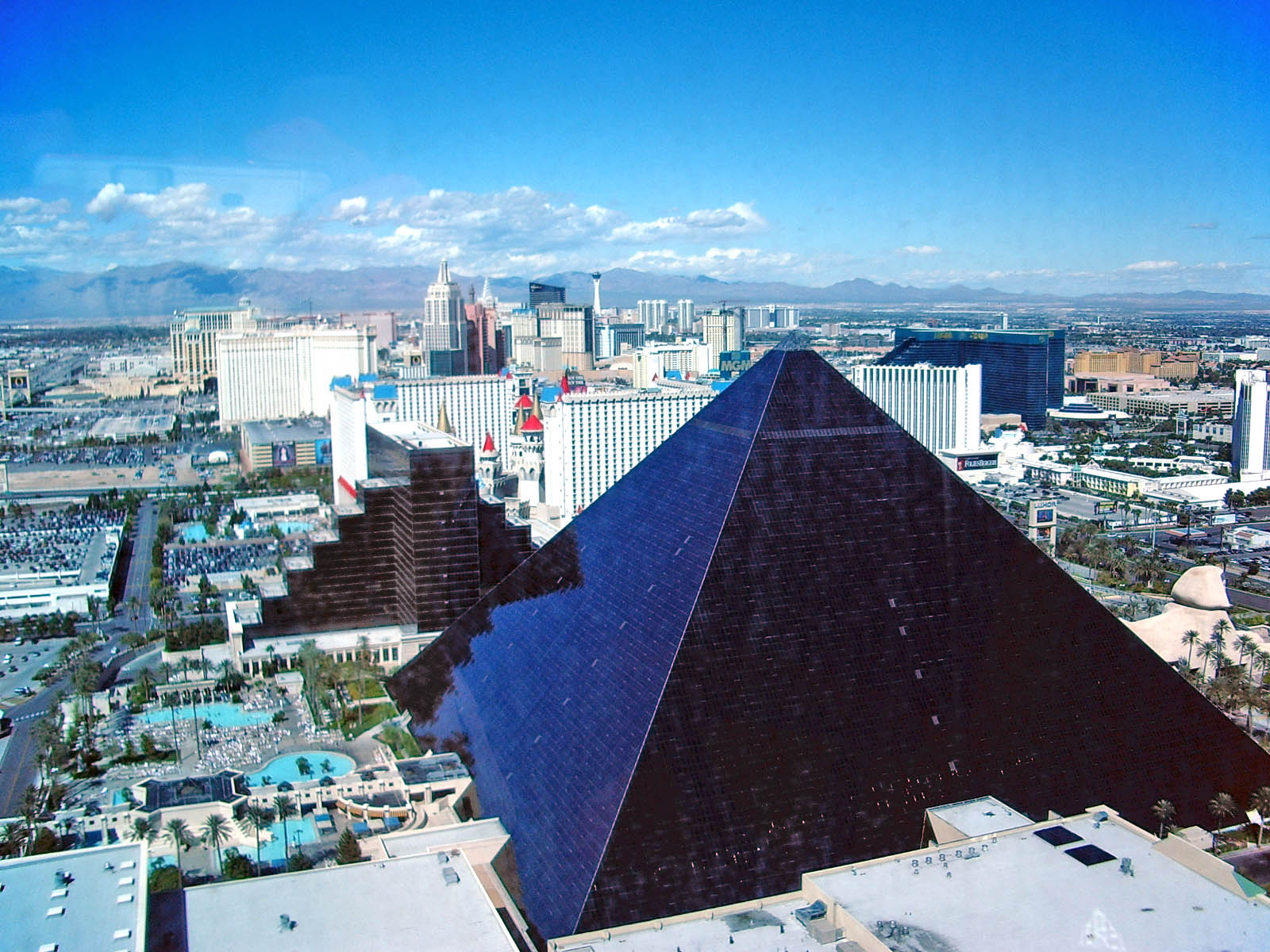
Luxor Hotel in Las Vegas, Nevada

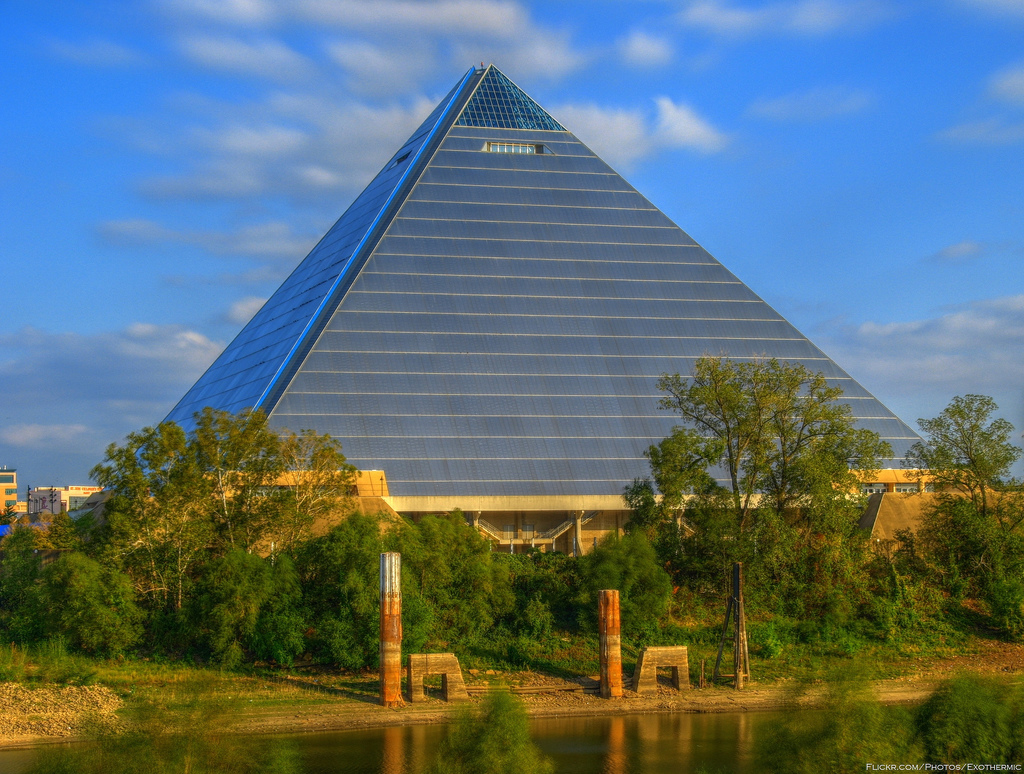
Pyramid Arena in Memphis, Tennessee

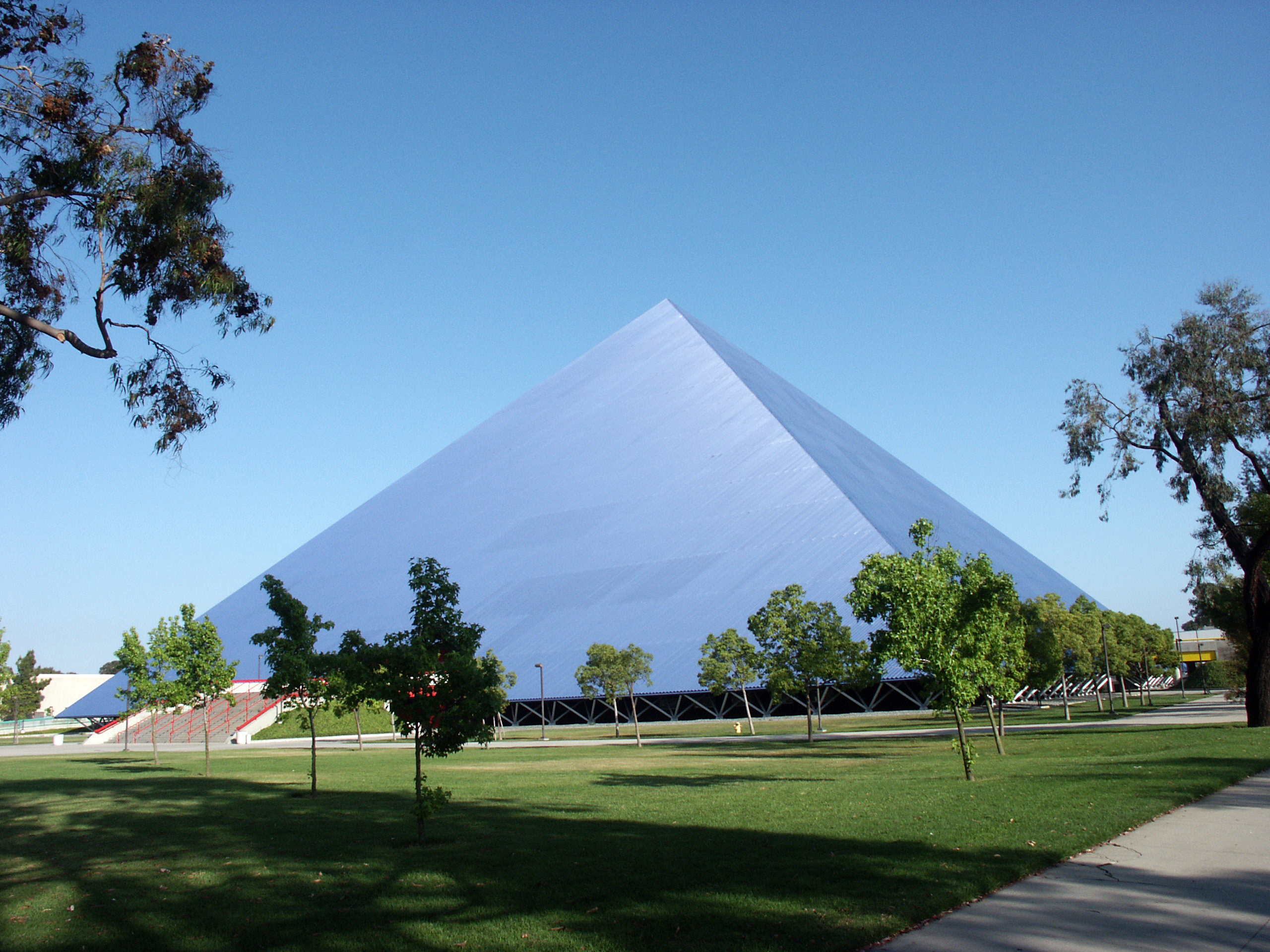
Walter Pyramid in Long Beach, California

=== Modern mausoleums ===
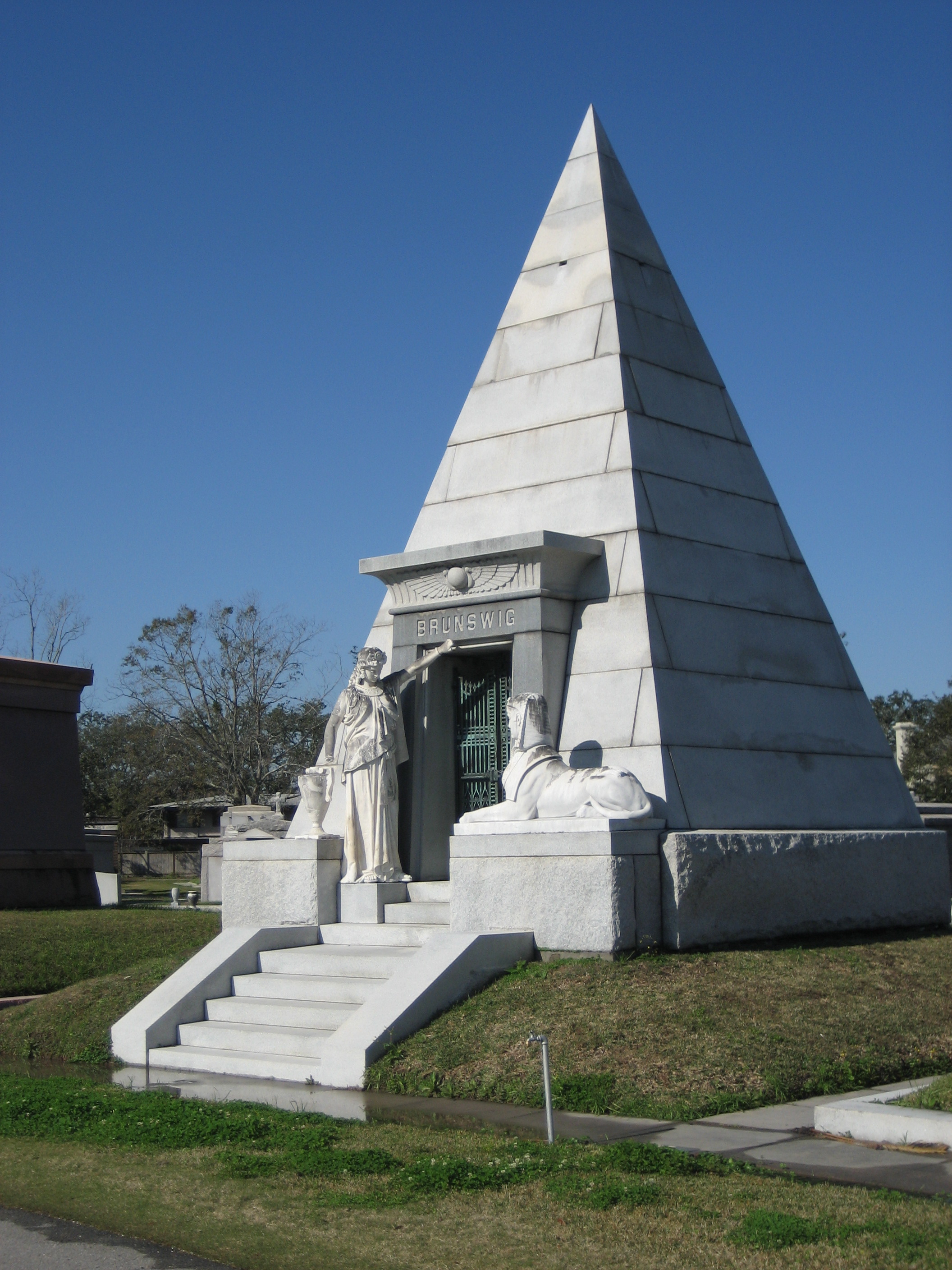
Metairie Cemetery, New Orleans

With the Egyptian Revival movement in the nineteenth and early twentieth century, pyramids became more common in funerary architecture. The tomb of Quintino Sella, outside the monumental cemetery of Oropa, is pyramid-shaped. This style was popular with tycoons in the US. The Schoenhofen Pyramid Mausoleum (1889) in Chicago and Hunt's Tomb (1930) in Phoenix, Arizona are notable examples. Some people build pyramid tombs for themselves. Nicolas Cage bought a pyramid tomb for himself in a famed New Orleans graveyard.

== See also ==
- List of largest monoliths
- Lists of pyramids
- List of pyramid mausoleums in North America
- Mound
- Pyramid power
- Stupa
- Triadic pyramid
- Tumulus (burial mound)
