= Karlsruhe Pyramid =

Coordinates: 49°00′33.1″N 08°24′14.2″E

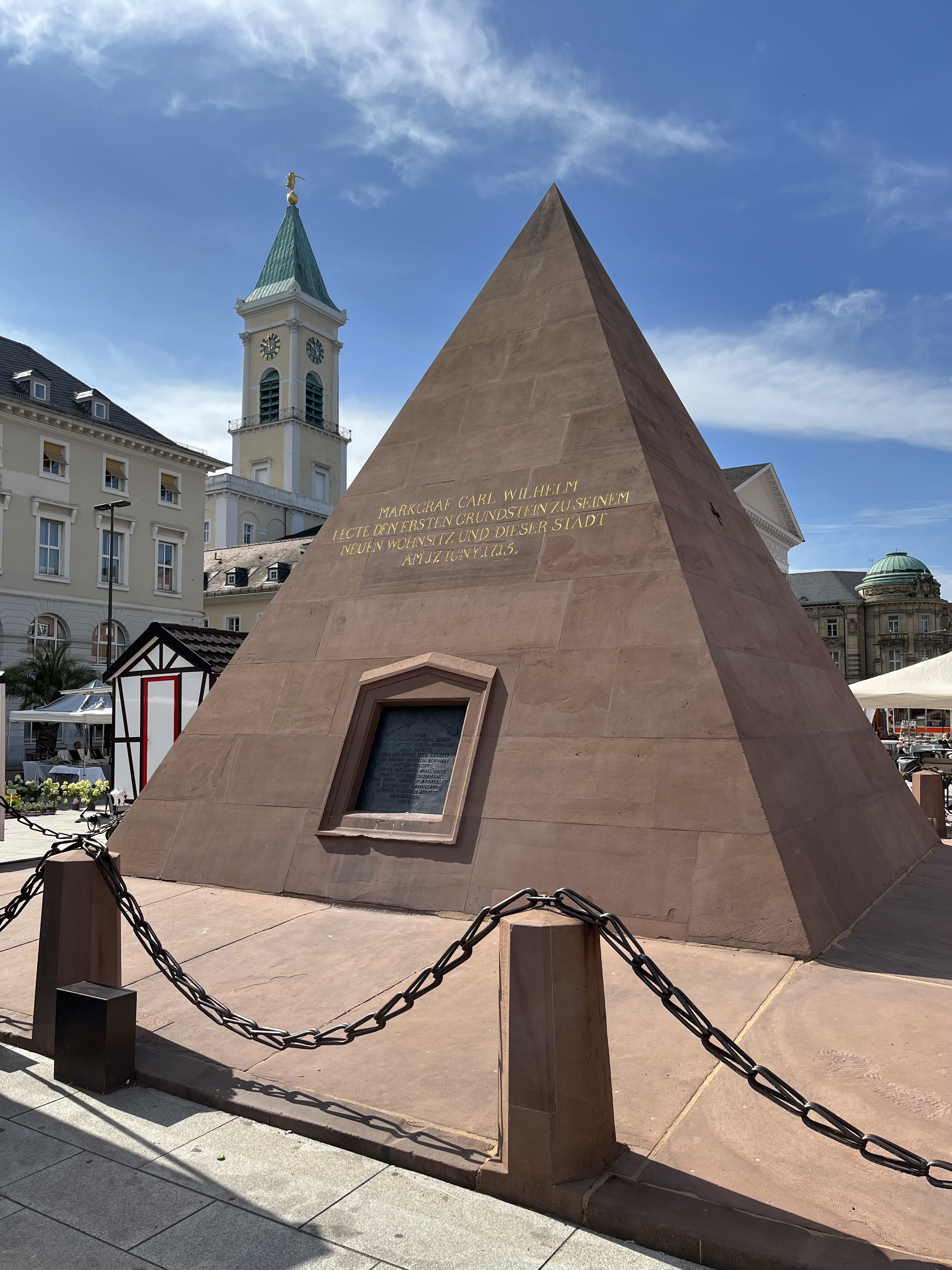
Karlsruhe Pyramid on the city's market square, Protestant City Church to the left

Cross section of Karlsruhe's pyramid: (1) upper chamber, (2) middle chamber, (3) grave, (4) Weinbrenner city map, (5) tomb

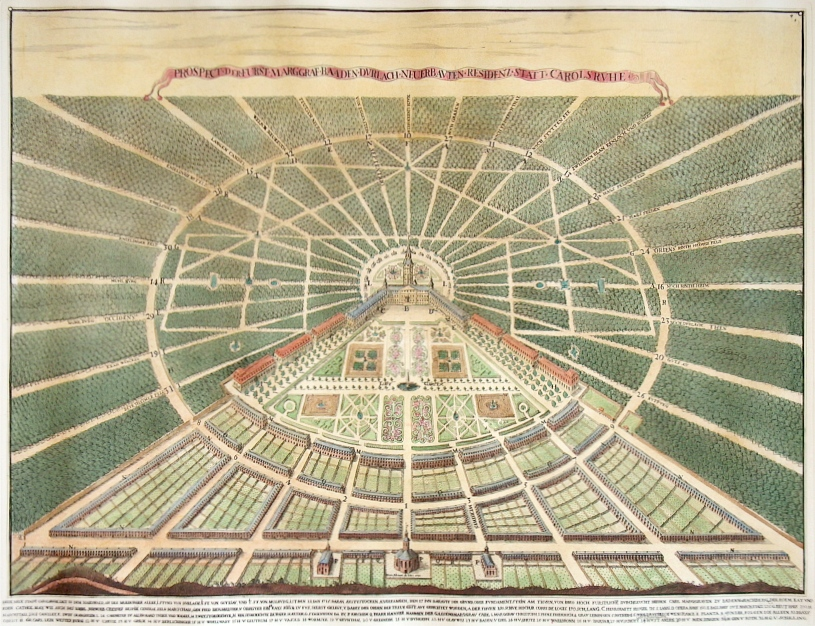
Karlsruhe in 1739; the city's former main church (south/bottom centre) was later replaced by the smaller pyramid

The Karlsruhe Pyramid is a pyramid made of red sandstone, located in the centre of the market square of Karlsruhe, Germany. It was erected in the years 1823–1825 over the vault of the city's founder, Margrave Charles III William (1679–1738). The pyramid is regarded as Karlsruhe's second emblem, the city's absolutist layout in the shape of a folding fan being the first.

The pyramid's central location was originally occupied by the Lutheran Concord Church, a Baroque timber-framed building. When Karlsruhe grew at the beginning of the 19th century, the church became too small and obstructed the southward expansion of the city and its market square. It was demolished in 1807, and initially a wooden pyramid was erected over the city founder's vault as a temporary measure before moving it into the new main church.

Due to lack of resources this plan could not be realised, and 16 years later architect Friedrich Weinbrenner designed the neoclassical stone monument as a permanent replacement for the old church. It has a square footprint and an exterior height of 6.5 metres (21 ft). The interior can be entered through a small square opening, but is only accessible with consent of its former owners (until 1940), the House of Baden. It consists of a vertical sequence of three chambers, the lowest of which is the original burial vault. The city's foundation stone is also located inside the pyramid. The monument is an example of Egyptian Revival architecture, inspired by the burial function of Egyptian pyramids and by similar buildings of the Napoleonic era. The pyramid was not affected by the extensive bombings in the Second World War.
