= Iglesia de San Andrés =

Iglesia de San Andrés may refer to:

- Iglesia de San Andrés (Bedriñana), a church in Asturias, Spain
- Iglesia de San Andrés (El Ciego), a church in Álava, Spain
- Iglesia de San Andrés (El Entrego), a church in Asturias, Spain
- Iglesia de San Andrés (Pola de Allande), a church in Asturias, Spain.
- Iglesia de San Andrés (Tenerife), a church in San Andrés, Santa Cruz de Tenerife, Canary Islands, Spain
- Iglesia de San Andrés (Valdebárzana), a church in Asturias, Spain

== See also ==
- Church of San Andrés (disambiguation)
