= Church of San Andrés =

Church of San Andrés may refer to:

- Church of San Andrés (El Ciego)
- Church of San Andrés (Madrid)
- Church of San Andrés (Murcia)
- Church of San Andrés (Presencio)
- Church of San Andrés Apóstol

== See also ==
- Iglesia de San Andrés (disambiguation)
