= Semáforo de Anaga =

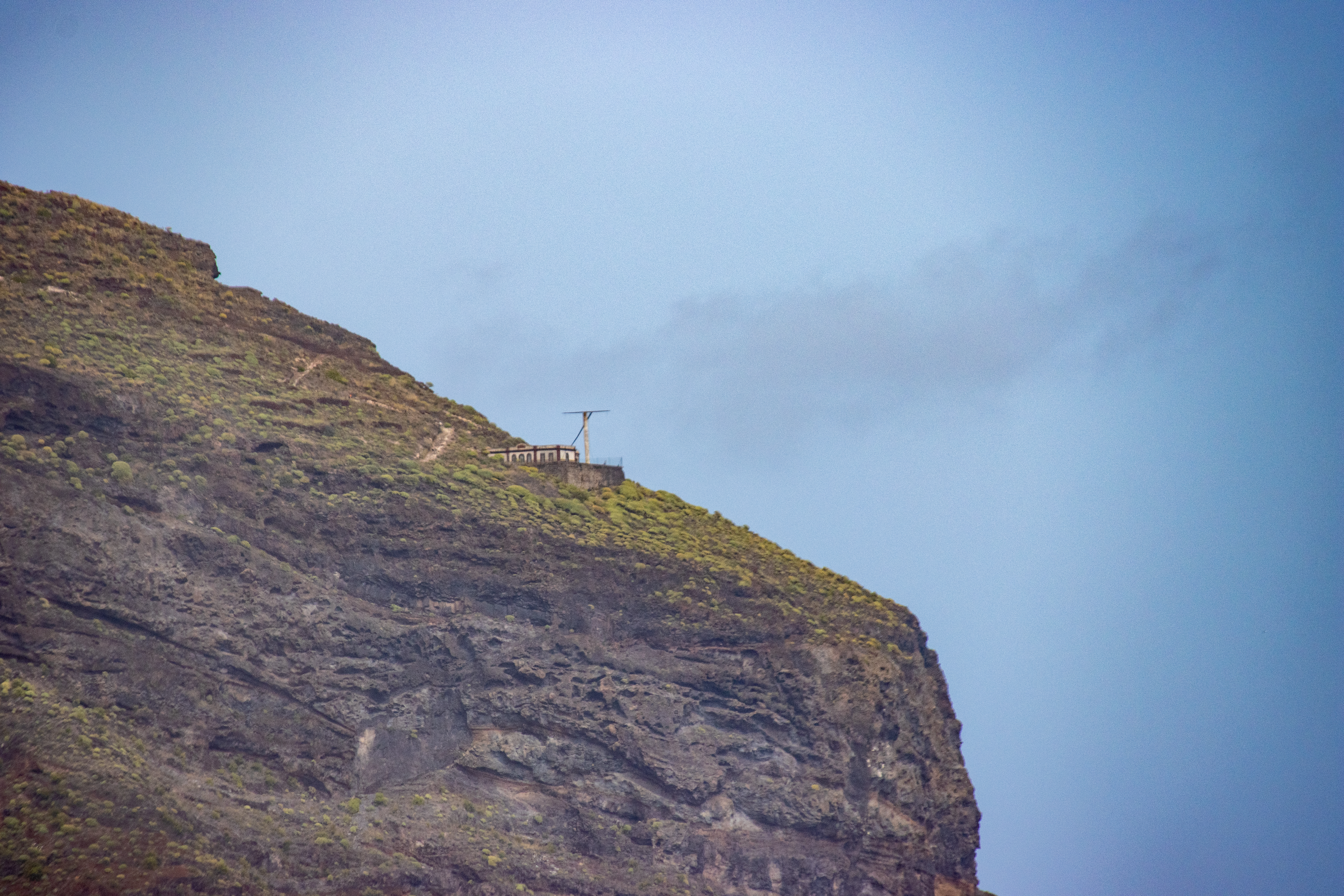
- The semaphore seen from Playa de Las Teresitas
- Interactive map of the Semáforo de Anaga area
- Alternative names: Semáforo de Igueste

General information
- Status: abandoned
- Type: Semaphore station
- Location: Santa Cruz de Tenerife
- Coordinates: 28°31′24″N 16°08′44″W
- Opened: 1895
- Closed: 1970

Design and construction
- Designations: Red List of Endangered Heritage (2015)

The Semáforo de Anaga or Semáforo de Igueste is a former semaphore station located near Igueste, Tenerife, Canary Islands. Opened in 1895, it operated until 1970, after which it was abandoned.

== Construction ==
The semaphore tower is located in Anaga, on the north of Tenerife. This part of the island has a good view of ships arriving from Europe, whether friendly or otherwise, as well as being able to monitor the weather conditions for ships passing through the area. The first watchmen in the area were appointed by the Cabildo de Tenerife on 17 April 1506, who initially communicated via smoke and fire signals. Over the years, they warned of attacks by the British, Dutch, French, Berber and Americans.

With the invention of telegraphy, watchtowers were revolutionised. Anaga was one of the twenty semaphores designated by Spanish royal decree on 9 June 1884. It is located on a cliff over 200 metres (660 ft) above sea level.

The building was constructed by the Ministry of Public Works, with funding from Hamilton & Co. The electric semaphore was received by the Ministry of the Navy in 1893. It began operation on 4 December 1895 and entered service on 20 November 1886, before being handed over to the Spanish government in December 1886. It communicated with the Navy Command about 6 miles (9.7 km) away, which had a matching observatory tower and signal pole. The semaphore was visited by Pascual Cervera y Topete in 1898.

== Operation ==
The main building is rectangular, with two attached houses for watchers, as well as other rooms including a kitchen and toilet. An attached rectangular building provided additional housing, with a third, hexagonal, building for an observatory. Two cisterns provided water, and there was an exterior bread oven. The building was modified several times while operating, with materials delivered by camel.

The mast was 16 metres (52 ft) tall, with a twelve-point crosshead for signal flags, and a lightning rod at the top. The mast was used to convey information about incoming ships, such as their nationality and type, using flags.

== Current status ==
The semaphore was handed over to the Hacienda on 2 July 1970, to be maintained as part of the state's heritage, after its operation became unnecessary due to advances in maritime communications. It ceased operations in 1971, and the building was subsequently abandoned in 1979. It is without legal protection, but was added to the heritage red list on 26 November 2015. The building has significantly decayed, losing doors, windows, interior walls, cisterns, alongside a general decay of the roof and its facade. The signal mast has split, and several fires have happened inside the building. The roof collapsed in 2012.

There is no road to the semaphore: access is only by the PR-TF 5.1 path, which starts from the Igueste church, and covers 2.5 kilometres (1.6 mi) with a steep incline.

In 2018, the 123rd birthday of the semaphore was celebrated by flares lit at the site, and an optical signal from the Tenerife Naval Command.
