= Aimar Blázquez =

Spanish footballer (born 2006)

Personal information
- Full name: Aimar Blázquez Labraca
- Date of birth: 19 March 2006 (age 20)
- Place of birth: Cubas de la Sagra, Spain
- Height: 1.94 m (6 ft 4 in)
- Position: Forward

Team information
- Current team: Valencia B
- Number: 9

Youth career
- 2011–2013: Griñón
- 2013–2014: Illescas
- 2014–2016: Rayo Vallecano
- 2016–2018: Real Madrid
- 2018–2019: Leganés
- 2019–2020: Villarreal
- 2020–2021: Roda
- 2021–2025: Valencia

Senior career*
Years	Team	Apps	(Gls)
2024–	Valencia B	41	(4)
2026–	Valencia	1	(0)

International career
2025	Spain U19	2	(0)
- * Club domestic league appearances and goals as of 20 September 2026

Aimar Blázquez Labraca (born 19 March 2006) is a Spanish professional footballer who plays as a forward for Valencia CF Mestalla.

== Club career ==
Born in Cubas de la Sagra, Community of Madrid, Blázquez joined Real Madrid's La Fábrica in 2016, from Rayo Vallecano, but was released in 2018 and spent a year at CD Leganés before joining the structure of Villarreal CF. In 2021, he moved to Valencia CF, being initially a member of the Cadete squad.

On 11 June 2024, Blázquez renewed his contract with the Che until 2027, and made his senior debut with the reserves on 12 October, playing the last 29 minutes of a 2–1 Segunda Federación home loss to Terrassa FC. He scored his first senior goal roughly one year later, netting the B's second in a 2–1 away win over SD Ibiza Islas Pitiusas.

Blázquez made his first team – and La Liga – debut on 20 September 2026, coming on as a late substitute for Hugo Duro in a 3–2 home loss to Real Sociedad, where he also took part in the play which resulted in Valencia's equalizer (an own goal from Luken Beitia).

== International career ==
In February 2025, Blázquez was called up to the Spain national under-19 team for two friendlies against Norway.
