= San Andrés, Santa Cruz de Tenerife =

San Andrés
- Village
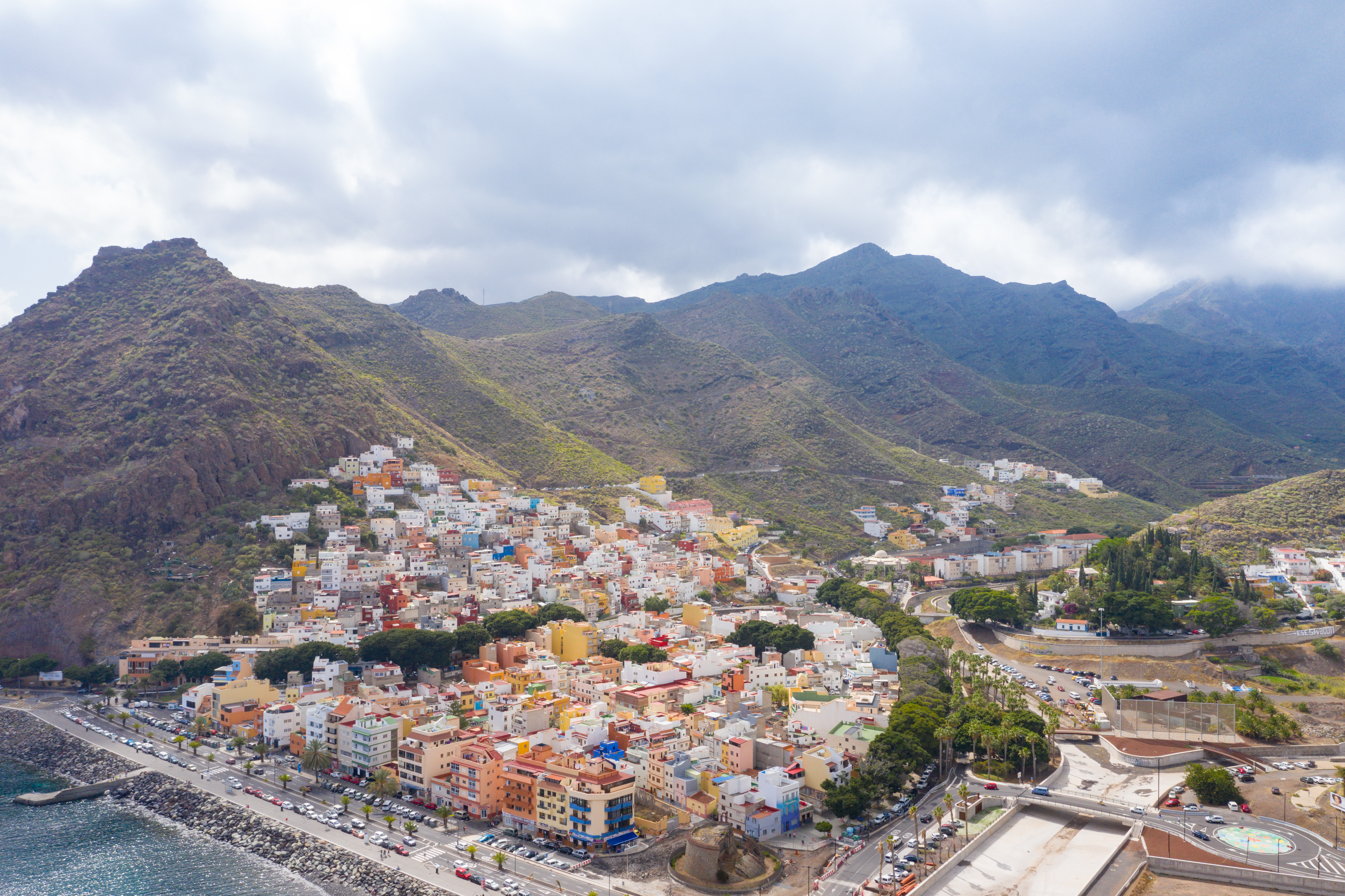
- Drone view

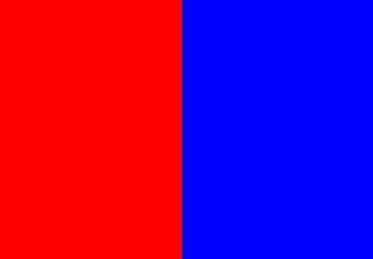
- Flag

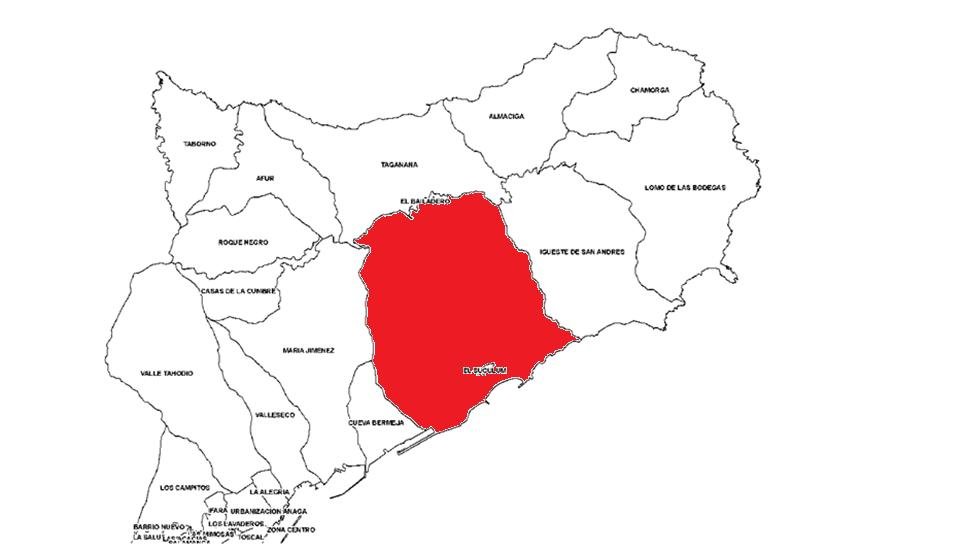
- San Andrés within Anaga district

- Location in Canary Islands
- Coordinates: 28°30′15″N 16°11′35″W
- Country: Spain
- Autonomous Community: Canary Islands
- Province: Tenerife
- Island: Tenerife
- Municipality: Santa Cruz de Tenerife

Population (2013)
  - Total: 3,121
- Time zone: UTC+0 (CET)
  - Summer (DST): UTC+1 (CEST (GMT +1))

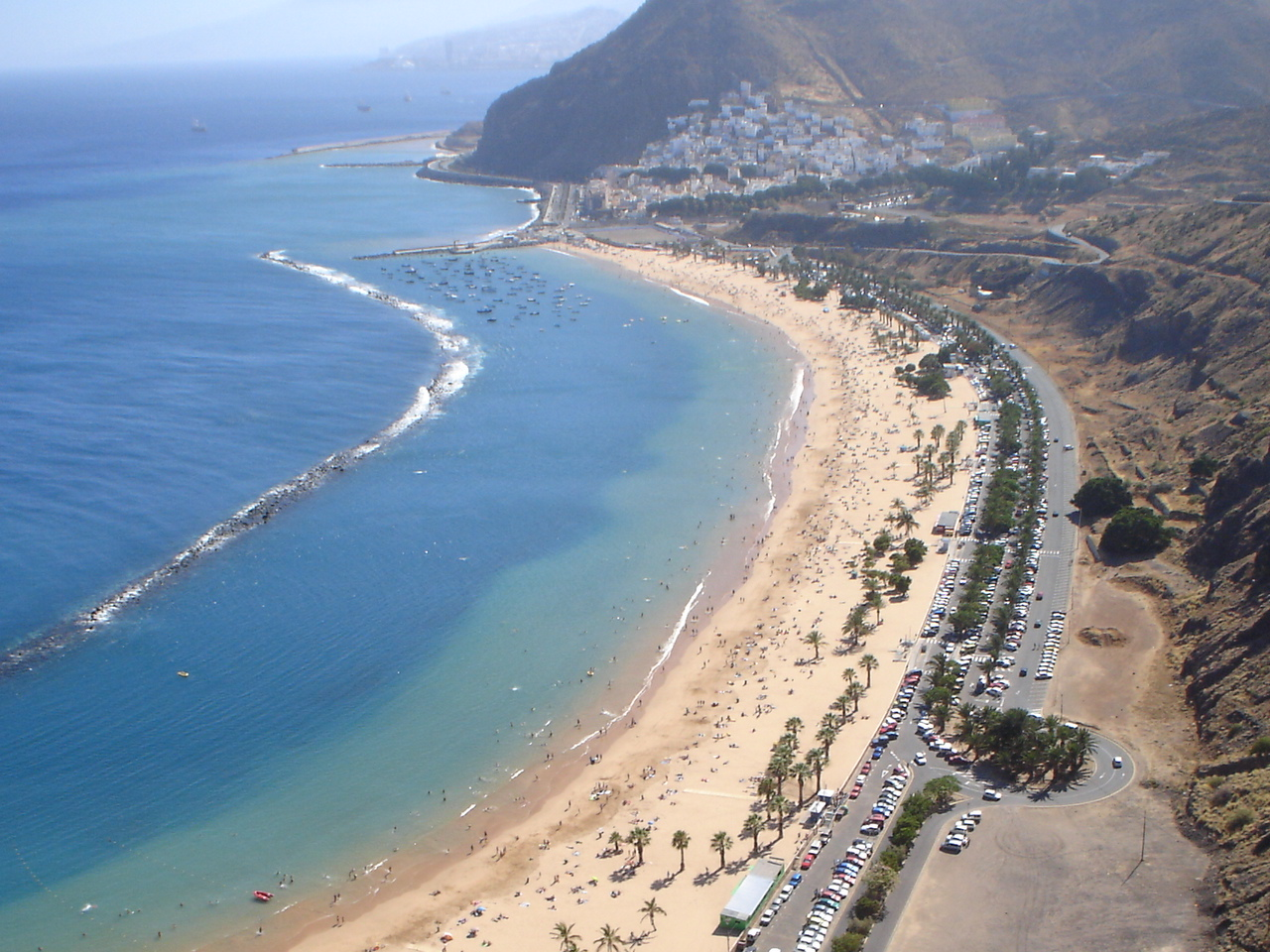
Panoramic of San Andrés and the Beach of Las Teresitas.

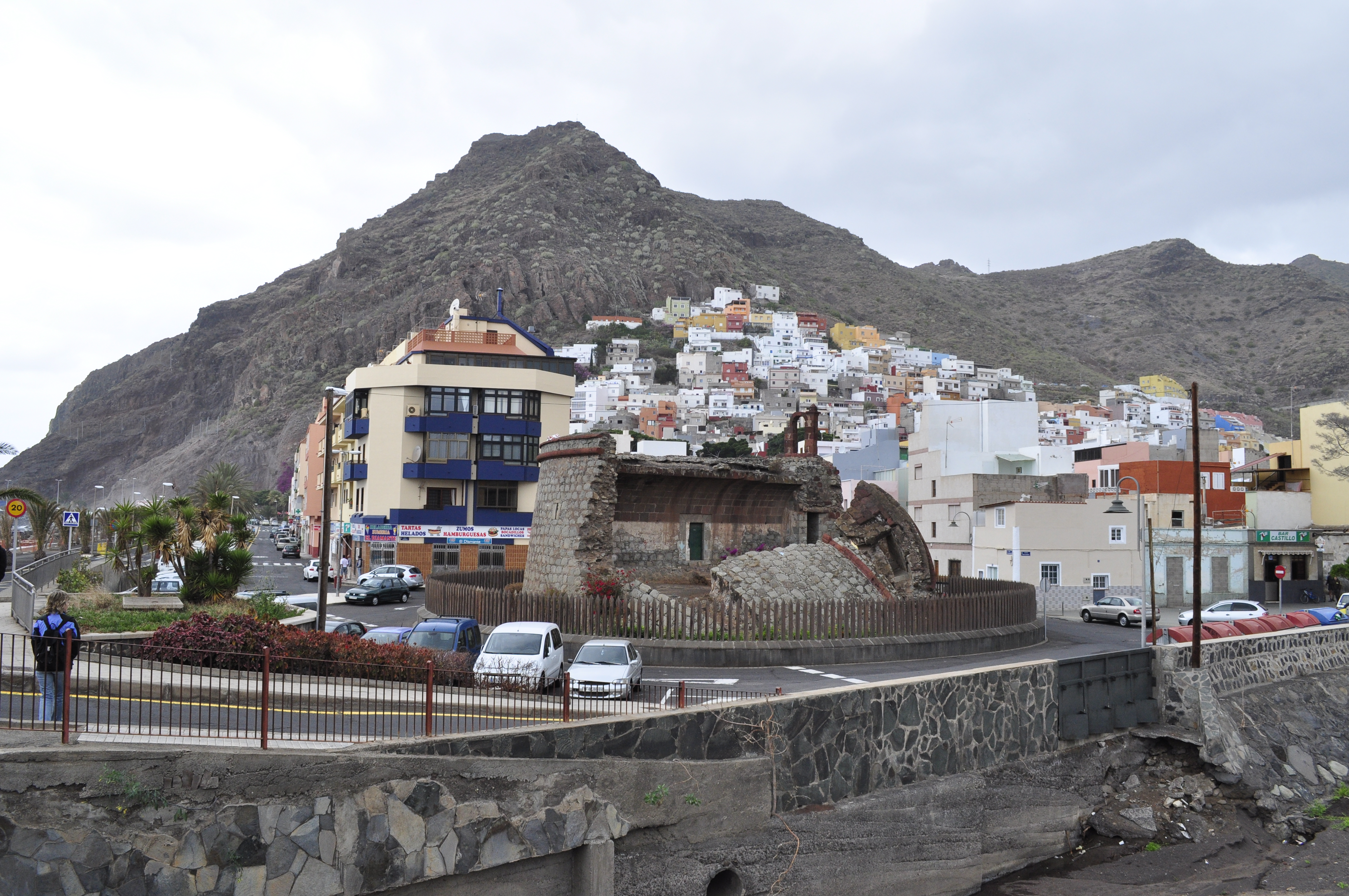
Village of San Andrés and the Castle of San Andrés.

San Andrés is a village located on the island of Tenerife in the Canary Islands (Spain). It is located on the coast, at the foot of the Anaga mountains, 7 km (4.3 mi) northeast of the capital city Santa Cruz de Tenerife. It is administratively part of the municipality of Santa Cruz de Tenerife. San Andrés is one of the oldest villages of Canary Islands, and was founded around 1498.

== Local names ==
San Andrés (English translation 'Saint Andrew') has had numerous names throughout its history. The Guanches called the two valleys that make up San Andrés "Abicor" and "Ibaute", being current valleys of Cercado and of Las Huertas respectively. According to some scholars "Abicor" was associated with fig trees, while others are similar to African voices to refer to the hives. Already after the arrival of the Spaniards, the valley became known in the early years of the Higueras Valley (by the abundance of them), Valle de Las Higueras and Los Sauces, Valle de Salazar (by the owners dated to the area) and Valle de San Andrés (being the saint's devotees Salazar) interchangeably. Finally prevail the current name of San Andrés. However, during the first half of the twentieth century was also known as "San Andres de Pots" by the major pottery production.

== History ==
The area has been populated since the Guanches (former inhabitants of the island of Tenerife), in fact, according to contemporary sources to the conquest of the Canary Islands, one of the caves where the aboriginal king of Anaga resided was in the San Andrés Valley. At the time of the conquest, this mencey was Beneharo. In a cave on the outskirts of this locality was discovered the famous Mummy of San Andrés, a mummified body belonging to the guanche culture. It is now held in the Museum of the Nature and the Man in the city of Santa Cruz de Tenerife.

In 1498, the Castilian Lope de Salazar received these lands after the conquest. From 1505–1510 Don Lope, built the chapel, on which the current church is based, and he placed two images: St. Andrew the Apostle, by special devotion, and Saint Lucy, in honor of the name of his wife. St. Andrew Church (Iglesia de San Andrés) was constructed on a structure from an earlier period. Also in San Andrés is the Castle of San Andrés, which was built to defend Tenerife of the assaults of the pirates.

A fortress used to exist, with a tower built in 1706, but was destroyed by storms in 1740 and 1896. Until the construction of the defensive castle, the village had acquired the reputation of a "pirate port" because the place was used as a landing stage for the numerous robber ships that frequented the waters of the Canary Islands at this time. The current castle dates from 1769. It is a circular tower that formed part of the network of fortifications responsible for the island's defense. It holds special significance due to its connection with the Battle of Santa Cruz de Tenerife in 1797. In 1894, a flood caused by a storm destroyed part of the castle walls, leaving the rest in ruins.

The church is the oldest building in the town, built in the traditional Canarian style of the 17th century. Its origins lie in a small hermitage erected at the beginning of the previous century, around 1510, making it one of the oldest churches on the island and in the archipelago. Inside, one can find important treasures of historical heritage, such as the small wooden sculpture of the Apostle Saint Andrew, patron saint of the town (17th century); the crucified Christ, locally called the Santo Cristo del Cegato, carved in 1882 from orange wood by a local sculptor who was blind and the Altarpiece of the Souls in Purgatory, a work dating from 1850 and funded by alms from the faithful.

In 1797 San Andrés participated in the defense of the island in response to the attack of Admiral Horatio Nelson by sending militiamen of the village to the port of Santa Cruz and by avoiding thanks to its castle the assault of the English on this part of the coast.

During the 19th century, the village was an independent municipality until 1850, when it was definitively annexed to Santa Cruz de Tenerife.

The village maintains the traditional lifestyle throughout the first half of the twentieth century. During the Civil War and the postwar period, San Andrés lives moments of hard repression and becomes in place of adjustment of the contrary to the Franco regime.

In 1973 the administration brought 4 million bags of Sahara sand to the island into the Las Teresitas beach and improved the infrastructure. The Spanish court stopped larger tourist properties in 1984. Since the 60s of the twentieth century, but especially in the 2000s, it has been attempted to transform the village into a large tourist center related to Las Teresitas beach.

== Places of interest ==
- The Castle of San Andrés
- Church of St. Andrew the Apostle
- The Beach of Las Teresitas
- San Andrés's Maritime Avenue
- The fishing dock
- The building of the town hall
- The Avenue Pedro Schwartz (known as The Wall)
- The cemetery (one of the most ancient of the island)
- The multicolor bridge (it crossing the ravine at its mouth)
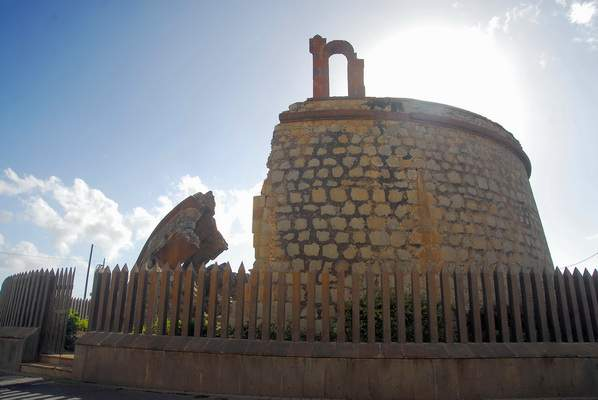
Castle of San Andrés

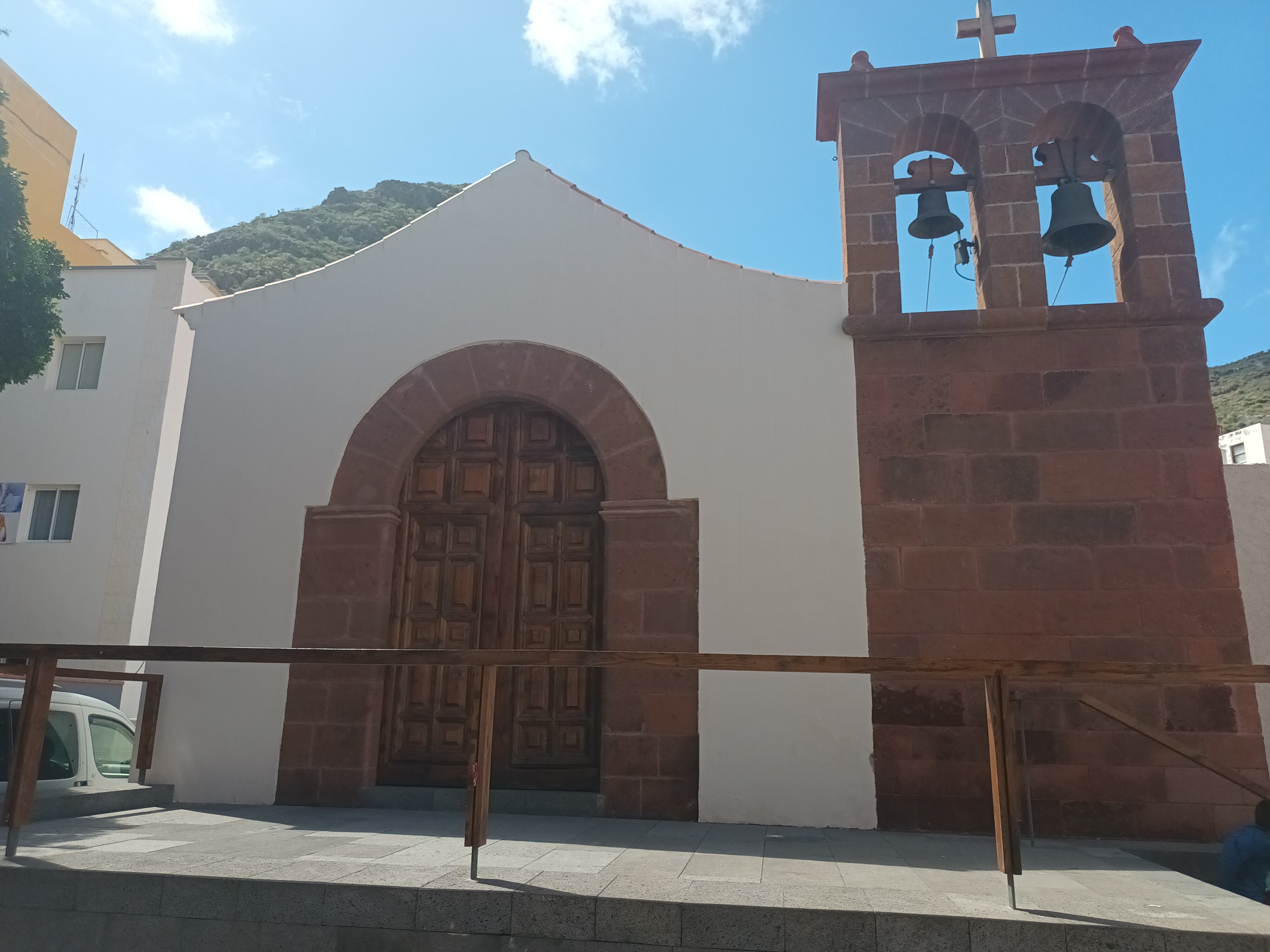
Church of San Andrés

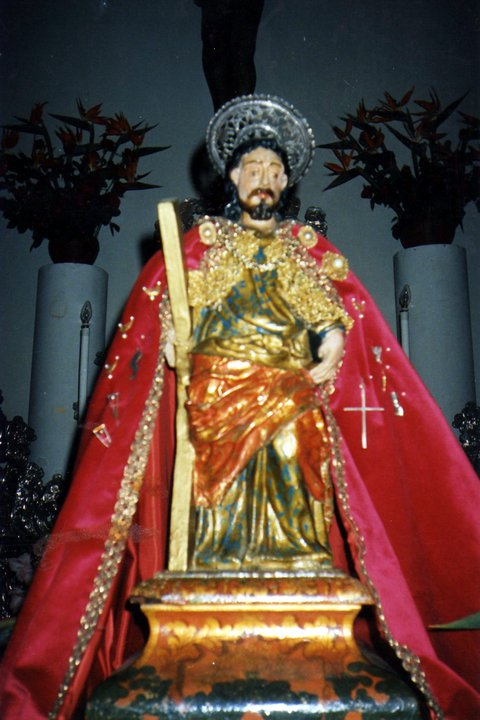
Statuette of Saint Andreas Apostle in the local church

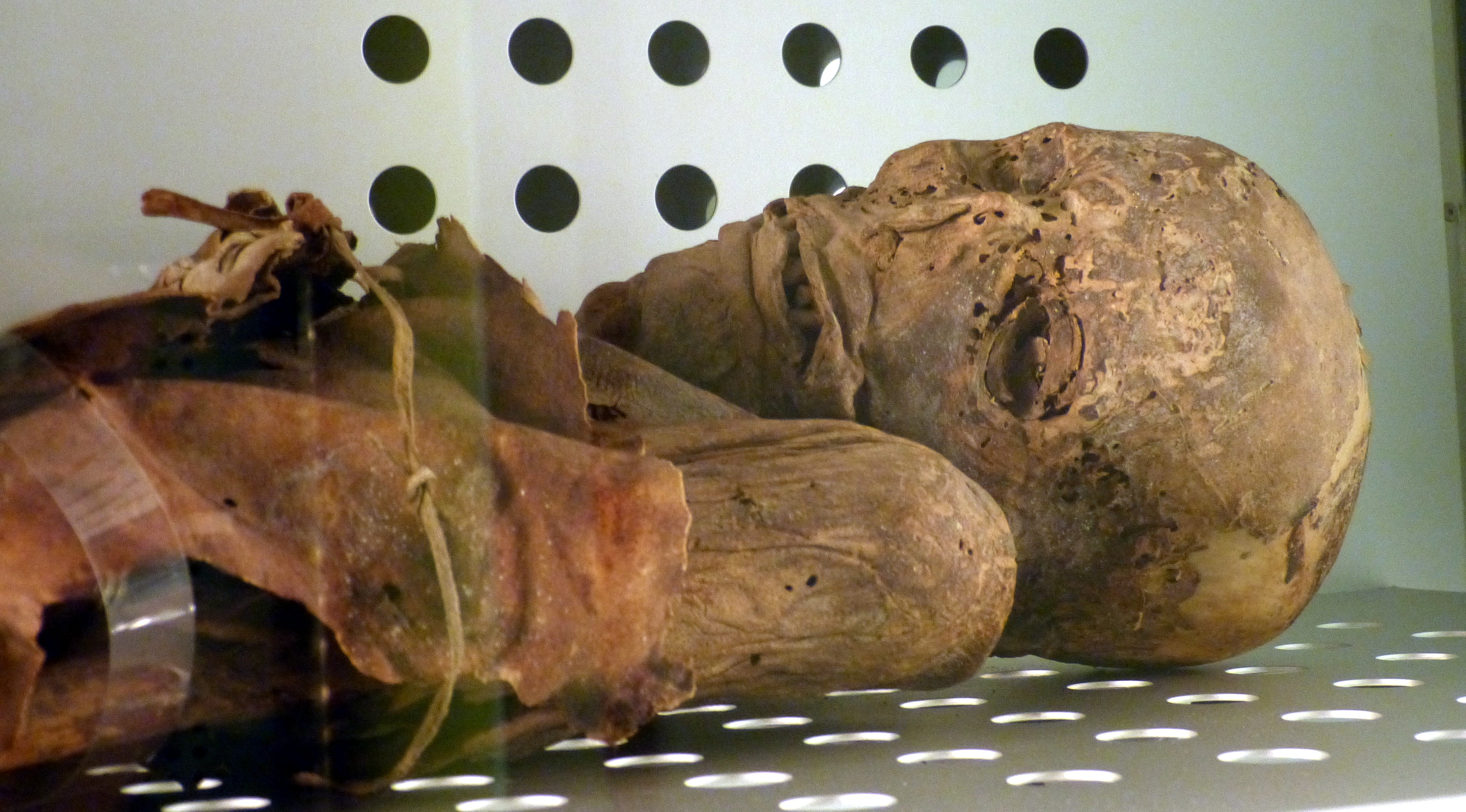
Mummy of San Andrés in the Museo de la Naturaleza y el Hombre (Santa Cruz de Tenerife)

== Economy ==
Residents of San Andrés live primarily on fishing. Tourism is also an important source of employment.

== Environment ==
Not far from San Andrés is the beach named Playa de las Gaviotas, a 200-metre-long (660 ft) black volcanic sand beach located between San Andrés and Igueste de San Andrés. The depth by the coastline is 180 m (590 ft).

In nearby Macizo de Anaga one finds the zone of "El Bailadero" (located between San Andrés and Taganana), so named because, according to the old legends, it was the place where witches danced around bonfires and practiced witchcraft.

== In popular culture ==
The little town has become popular due to the visits and recordings of important singers and celebrities:

- In February 1991 the Irish band U2 visited Tenerife. The band members toured San Andrés and Las Teresitas beach. The town's cemetery appeared in the promos for his album Achtung Baby.
- In May 1993, the Festival Amanecer latino was held on Las Teresitas beach, which brought together artists of the caliber of Celia Cruz, Oscar D'León, Rosario Flores, New York Band and other Latin Americans and Spanish singers. This festival was broadcast nationally on Televisión Española.
- In September 2023, actors Henry Cavill and Jake Gyllenhaal filmed the film In the Grey in various locations in San Andrés.
- In June 2024, singer Ed Sheeran recorded a video clip for his song Tenerife Sea on the coast of San Andrés.
