= Castle of San Andrés =

Castle in San Andrés, Canary Islands, Spain

Coordinates: 28°30′18″N 16°11′27″W

Castillo de San Andrés
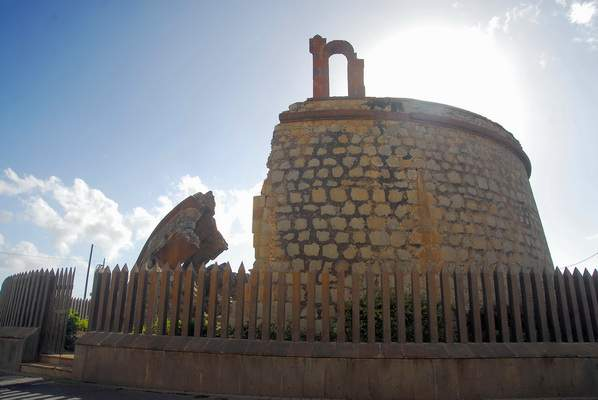
- Castillo de San Andrés
- Interactive map of Castillo de San Andrés
- Location: San Andrés (Santa Cruz de Tenerife, Spain)
- Designer: Patrimonio Histórico Español, Cultural Interest in the Canary Islands
- Type: Defensive tower
- Completion date: 1769

The Castle of San Andrés or Tower of San Andrés (Castillo de San Andrés or Torre de San Andrés) is located in the village of San Andrés (Santa Cruz de Tenerife, Canary Islands, Spain). This castle served to protect the island of Tenerife from pirate attacks.

== History ==
In the 16th century, the King Philip II sent the Italian military engineer Leonardo Torriani to fortify the coast of Santa Cruz de Tenerife, among the most important places to protect was the Valle de Salazar (Salazar Valley) which is now the town of San Andrés. Most researchers agree that the castle was built in 1706, although there are writings that mention it in 1697. Since the 17th century, it was considered necessary to defend the beach of San Andrés and to protect ships from pirate attacks.

During the Battle of Santa Cruz de Tenerife in 1797, the castle played a very important role as shots from the castle destroyed the mast and riggings of the Theseus, the ship of Admiral Horacio Nelson.

The castle was built adjacent to the mouth of the stream of the ravine of the Cercado de Andrés, just downstream of where it is joined by the stream of the ravine of the orchards. During a heavy rain this stream flooded, and collapsed part of the castle, but the other half is still standing.

On November 28, 1967, it was declared a Spanish Historical Heritage, the April 22, 1949 "Patrimonio Histórico Español" and in 1999 was declared of Cultural Interest in the Canary Islands. The castle named for San Andrés, and is a symbol of San Andrés and Anaga.

As of 2021 it is on the Spanish Lista Roja (Red List) as it is at risk of further deterioration.

== Gallery ==
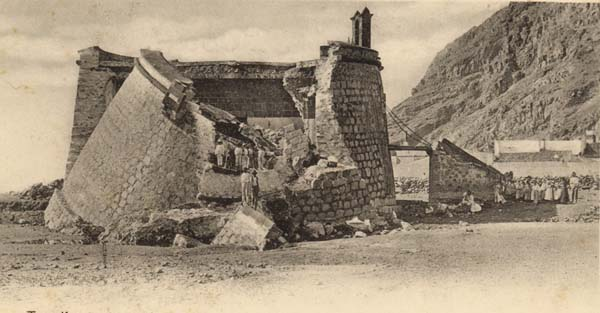
Castle of San Andrés, 1895-1900

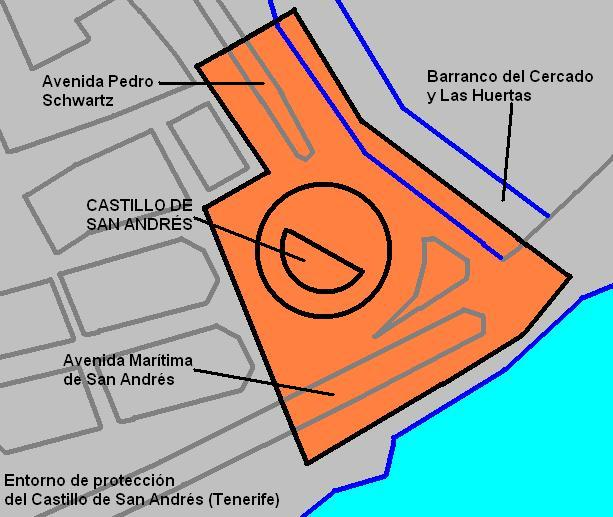
Protection area of the castle as Cultural Interest

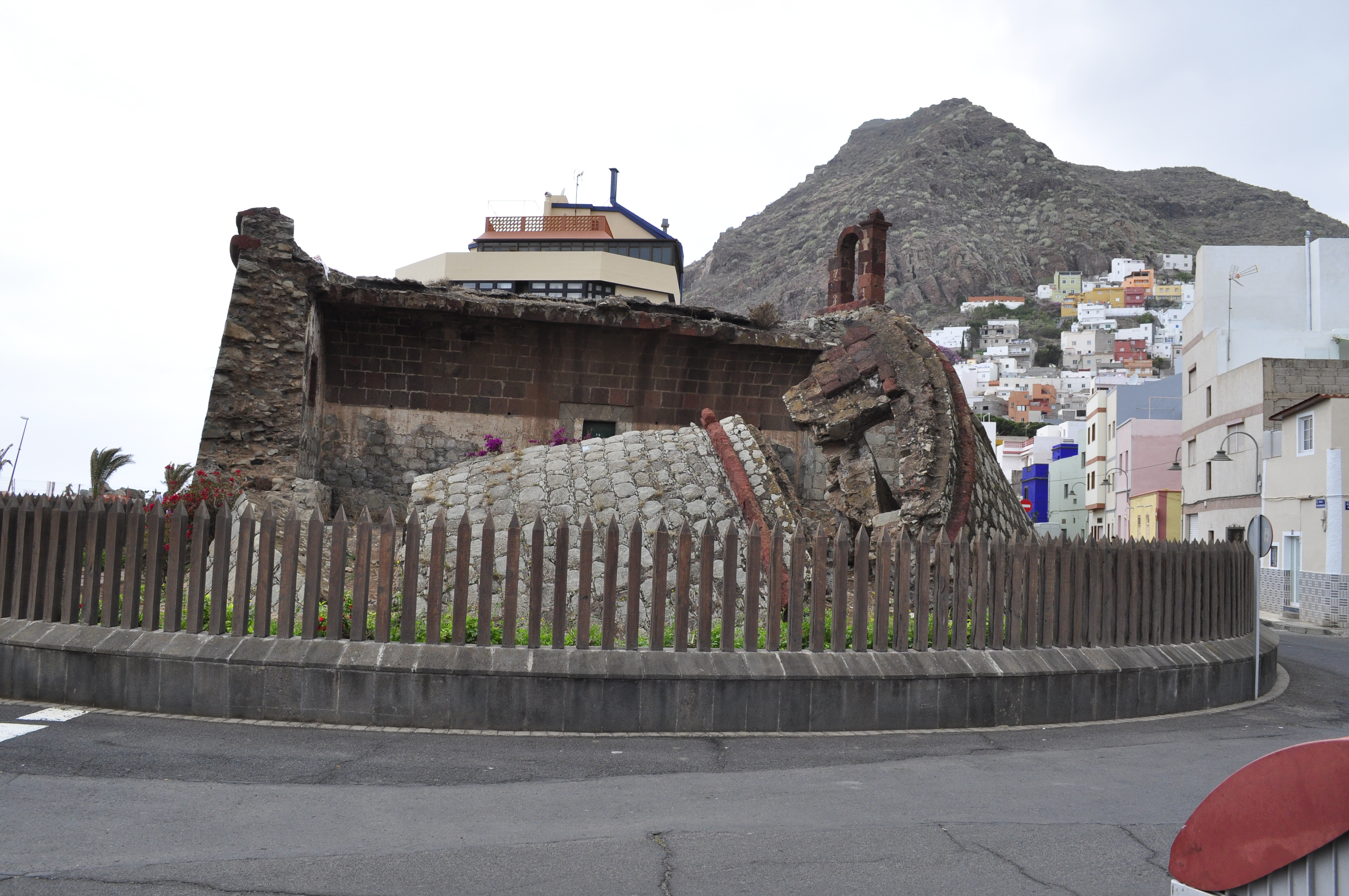
Current status of the castle
