= Iglesia de San Andrés (Pola de Allande) =

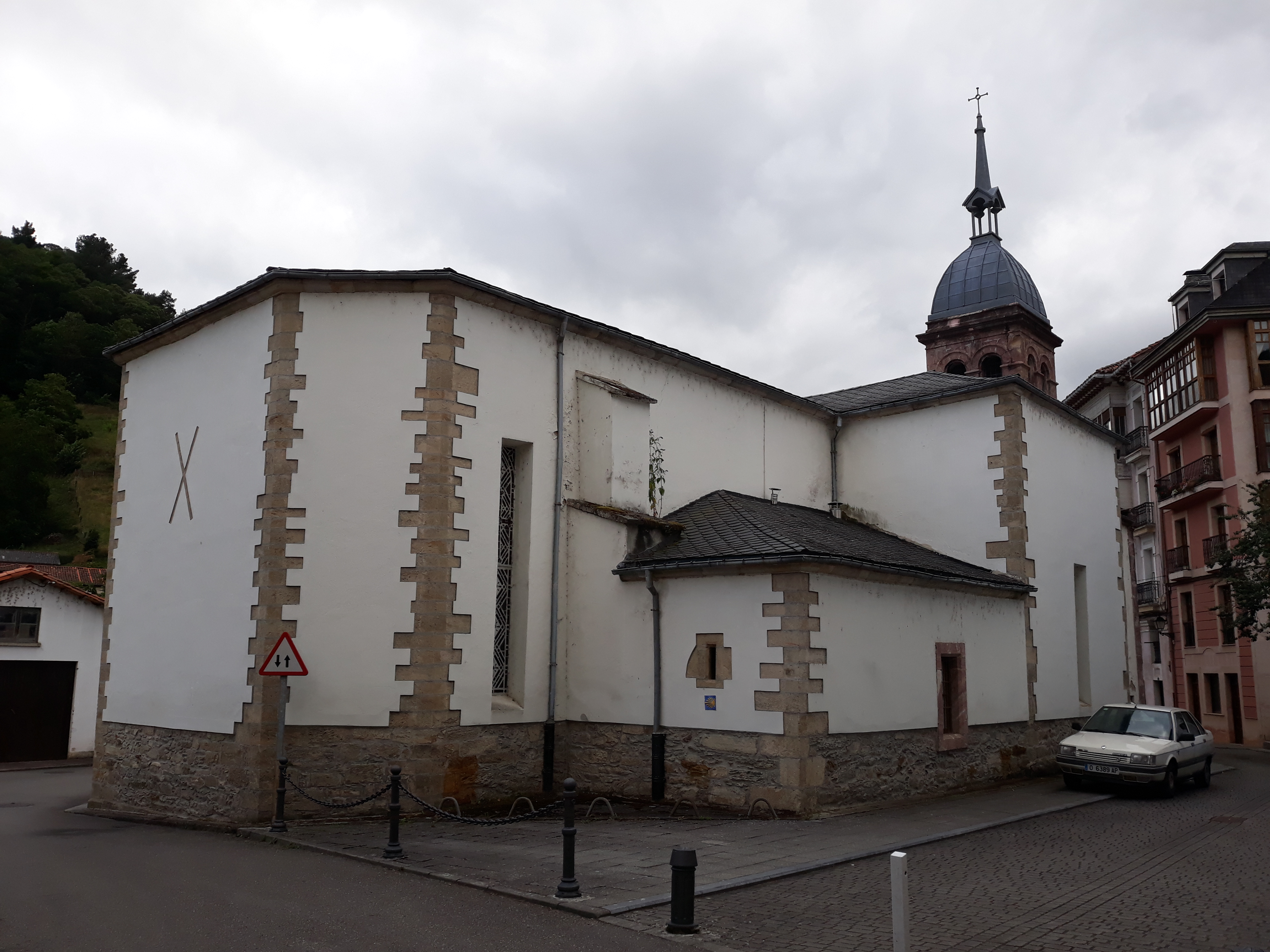
- Iglesia de San Andrés in 2019
- Iglesia de San Andrés
- Location: Pola de Allande, Asturias
- Country: Spain

Iglesia de San Andrés is a 16th-century Roman Catholic church located in Pola de Allande in the autonomous community of Asturias, Spain. It is dedicated to Andrew the Apostle.

== See also ==
- Asturian art
- Catholic Church in Spain
