= Iglesia de San Andrés (Valdebárzana) =

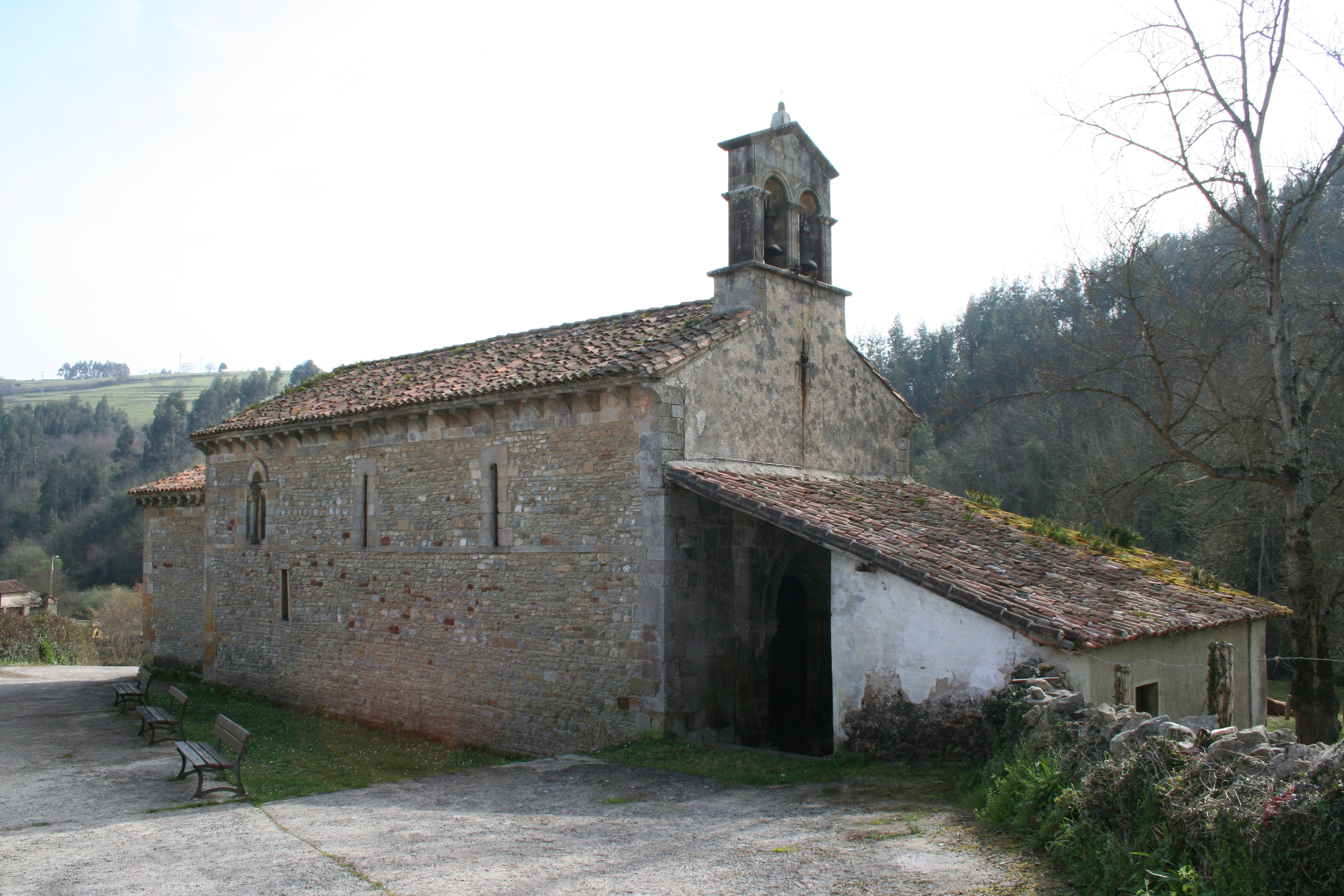
- Iglesia de San Andrés (Valdebárzana)
- 43.43244°N 5.47197°W
- Location: Asturias, Spain

History
- Dedication: 1189

Iglesia de San Andrés (Valdebárzana) is a 12th-century, Romanesque-style, Roman Catholic church, located in Valdebárzana in the autonomous community of Asturias, Spain. It was established in 1189.

== Gallery ==
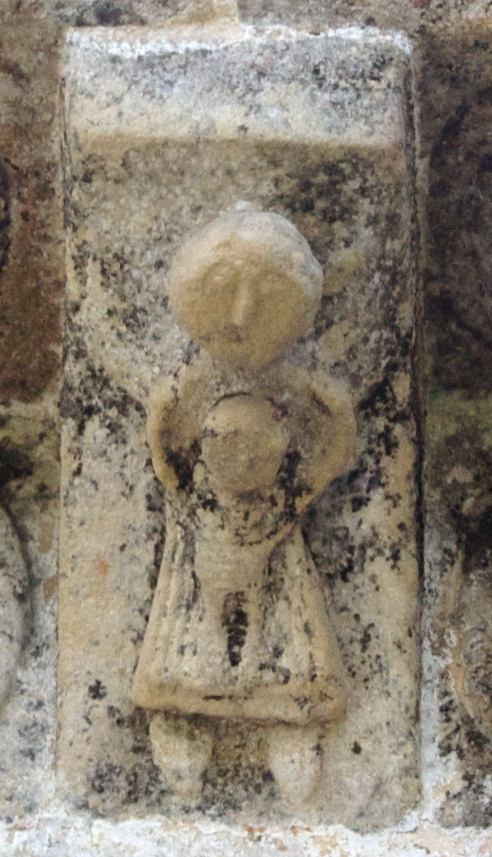

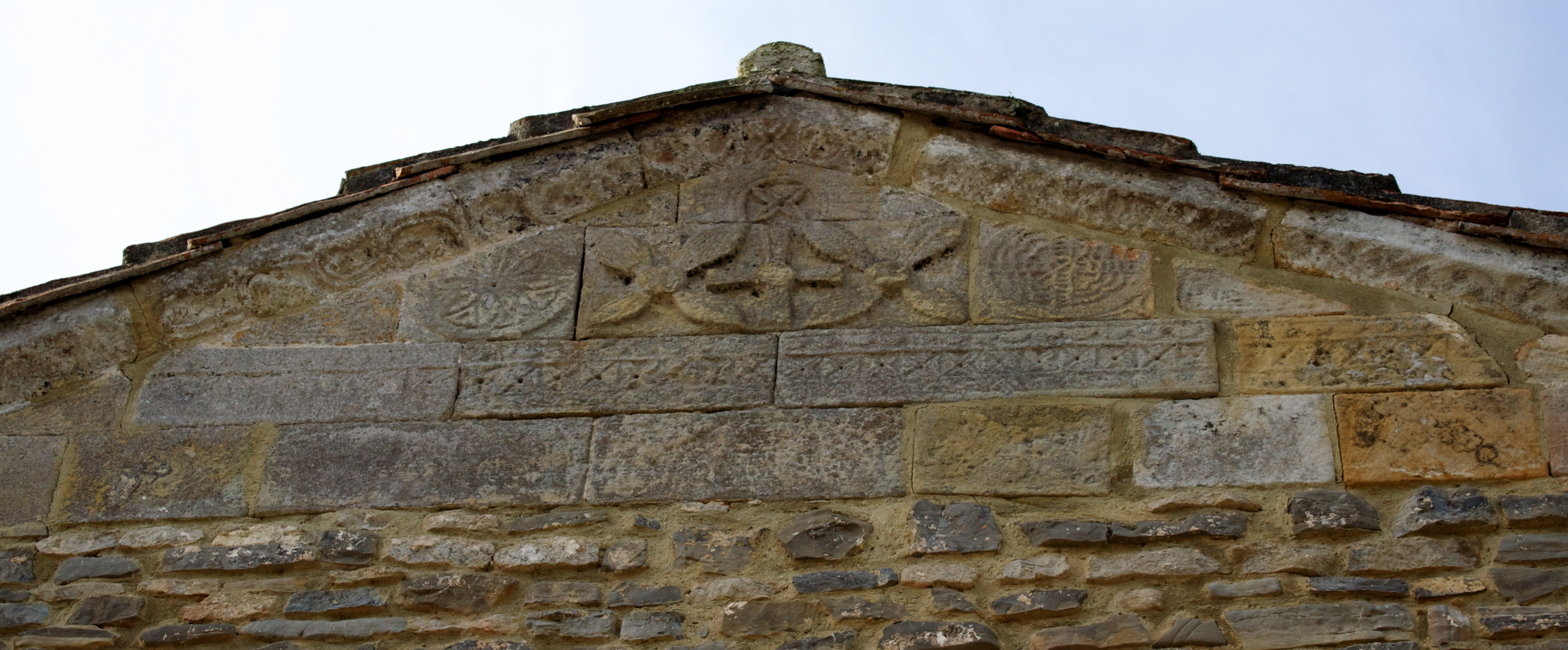

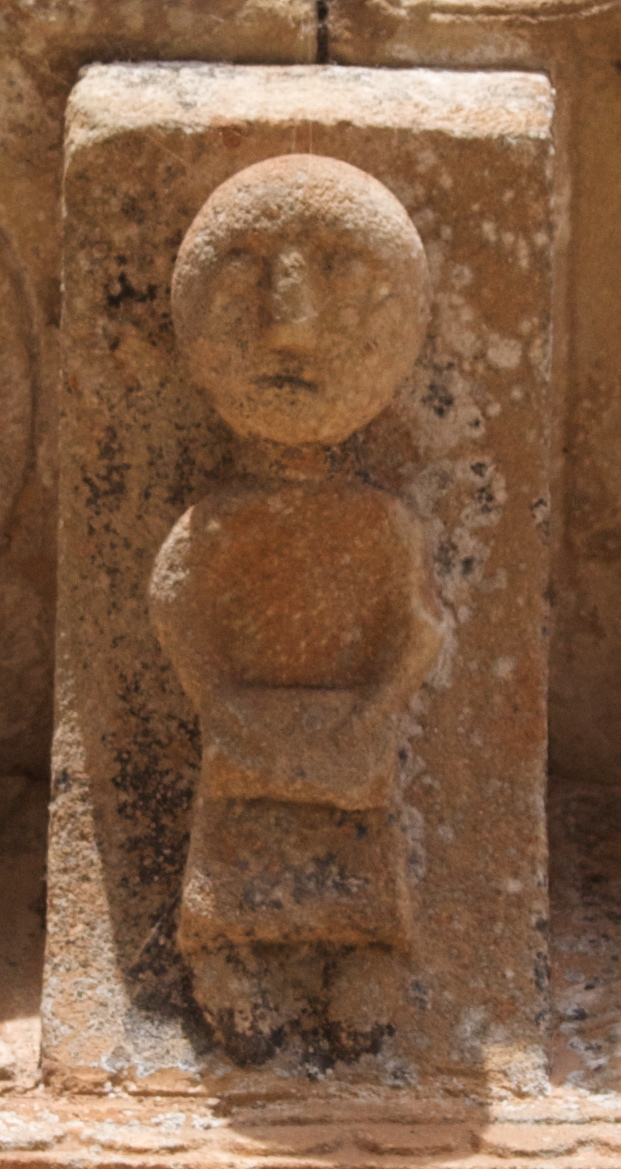

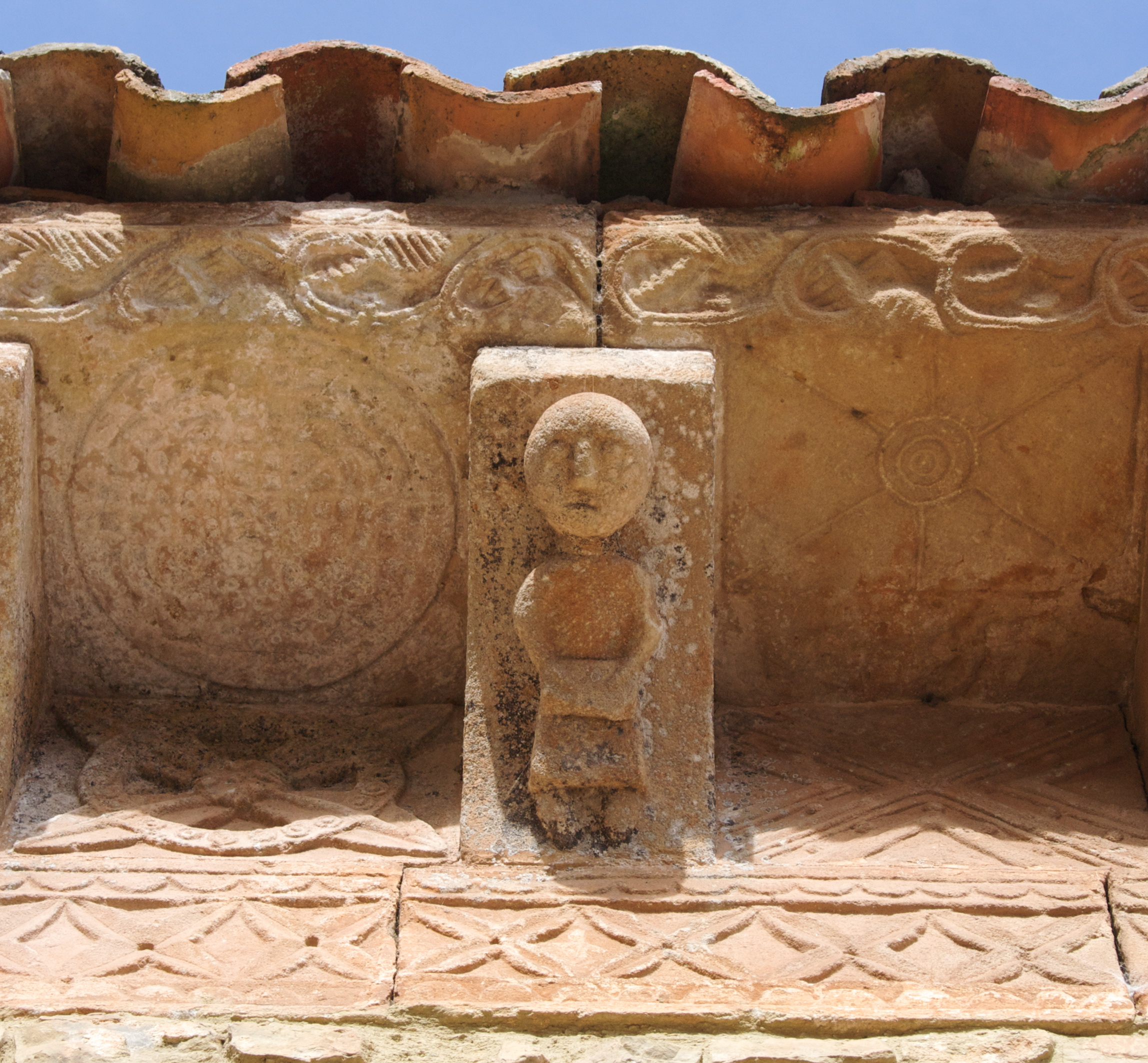

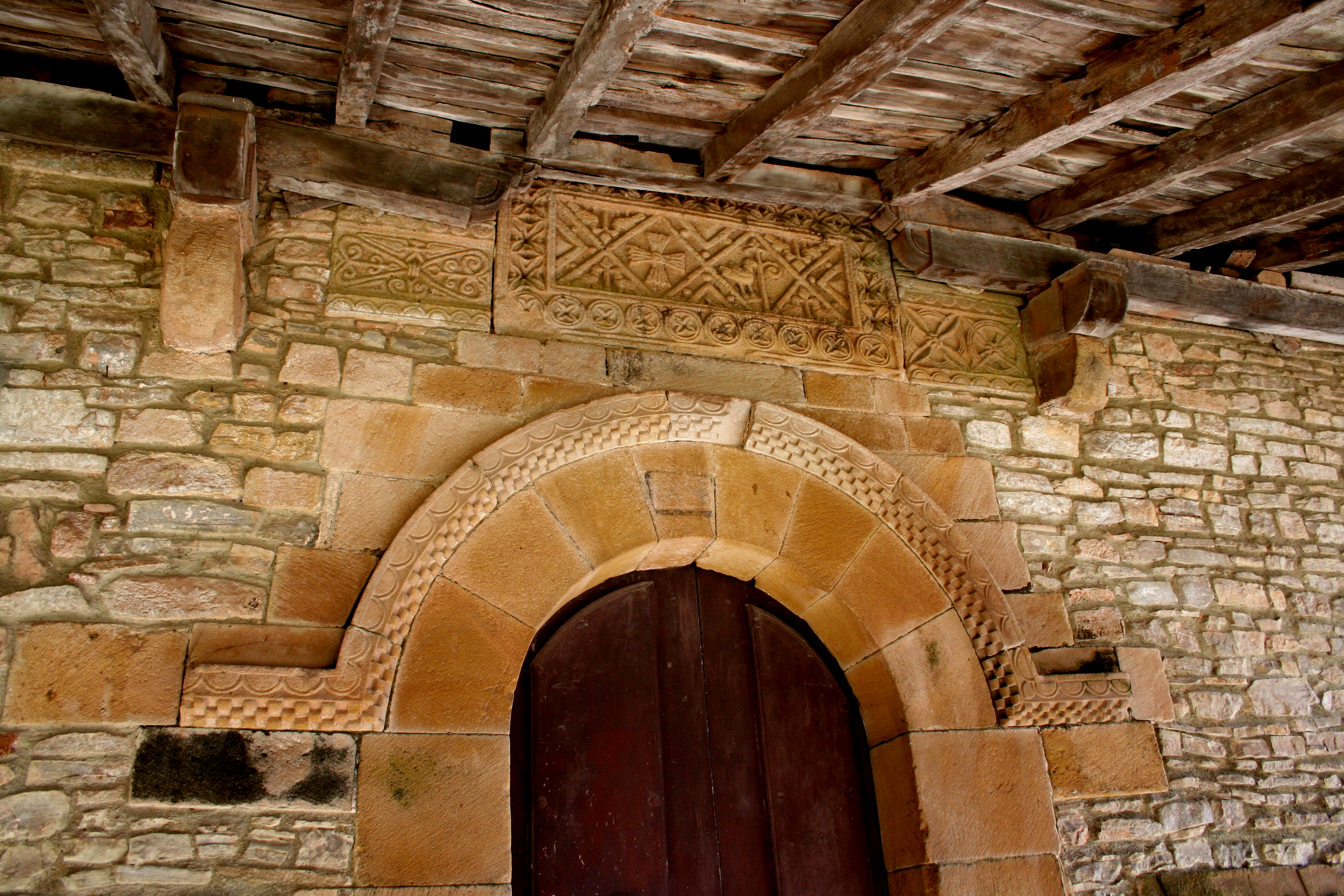

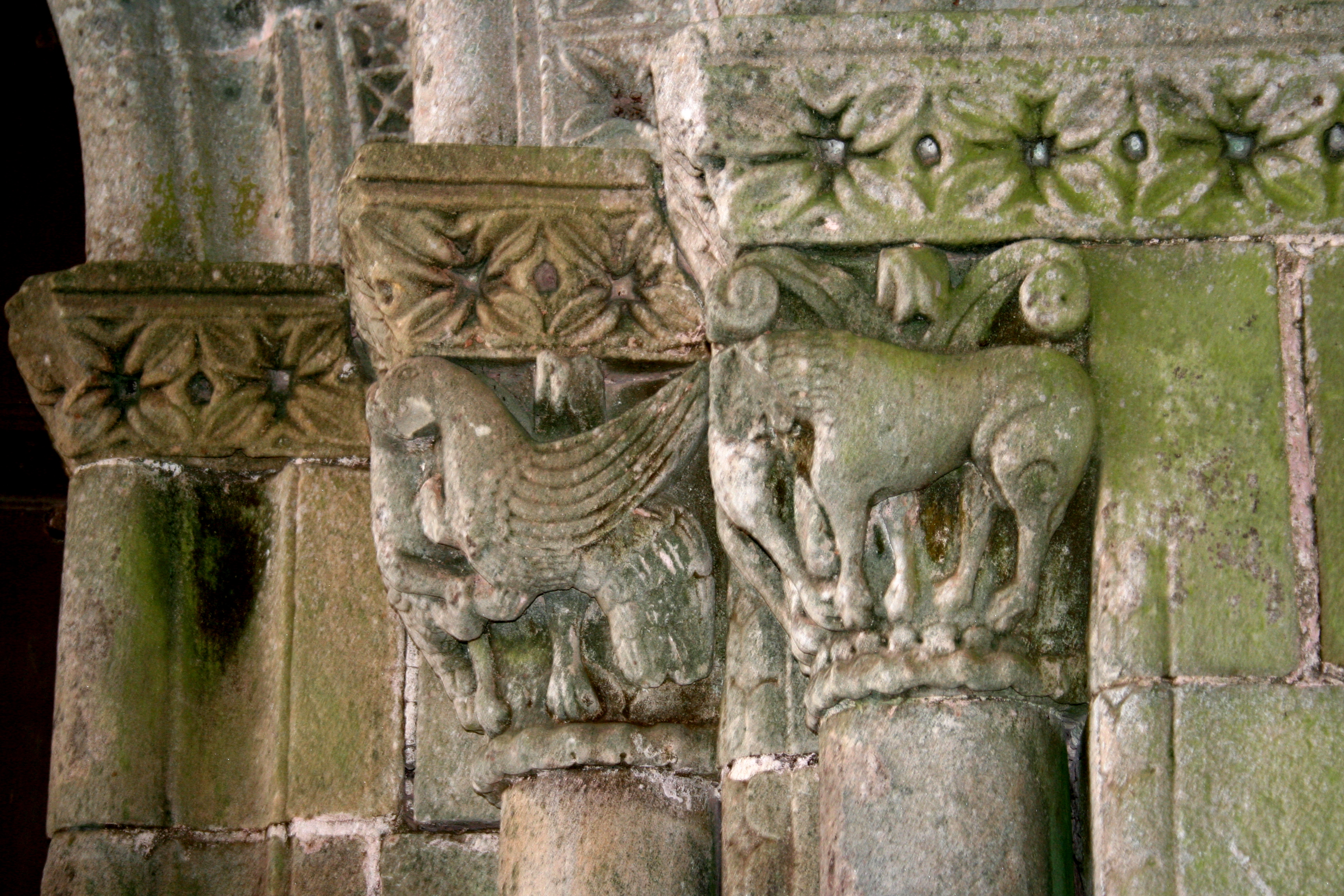

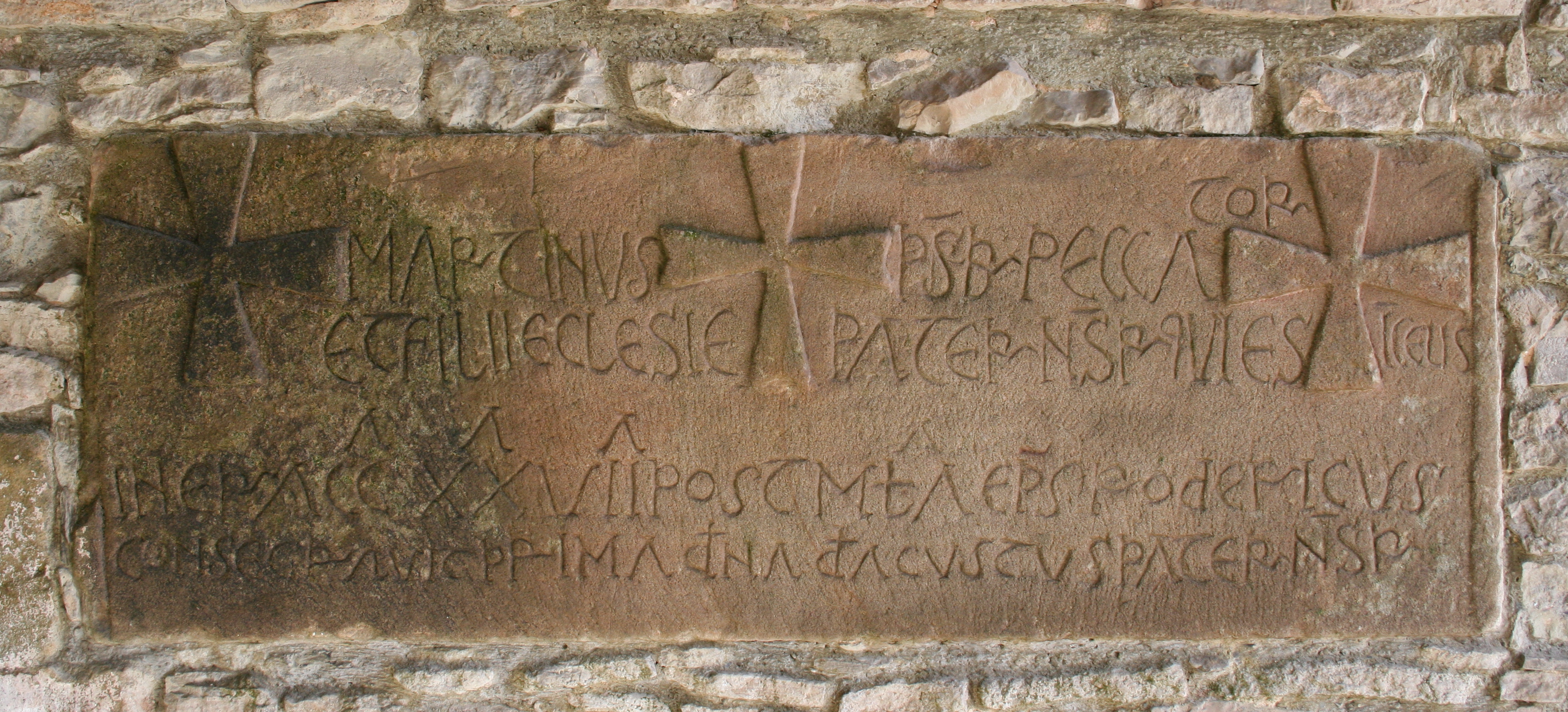
Lápida fundacional

== See also ==
- Asturian art
- Catholic Church in Spain
