= Cubas de la Sagra =

Coordinates: 40°11′29″N 3°50′17″W

- Municipality
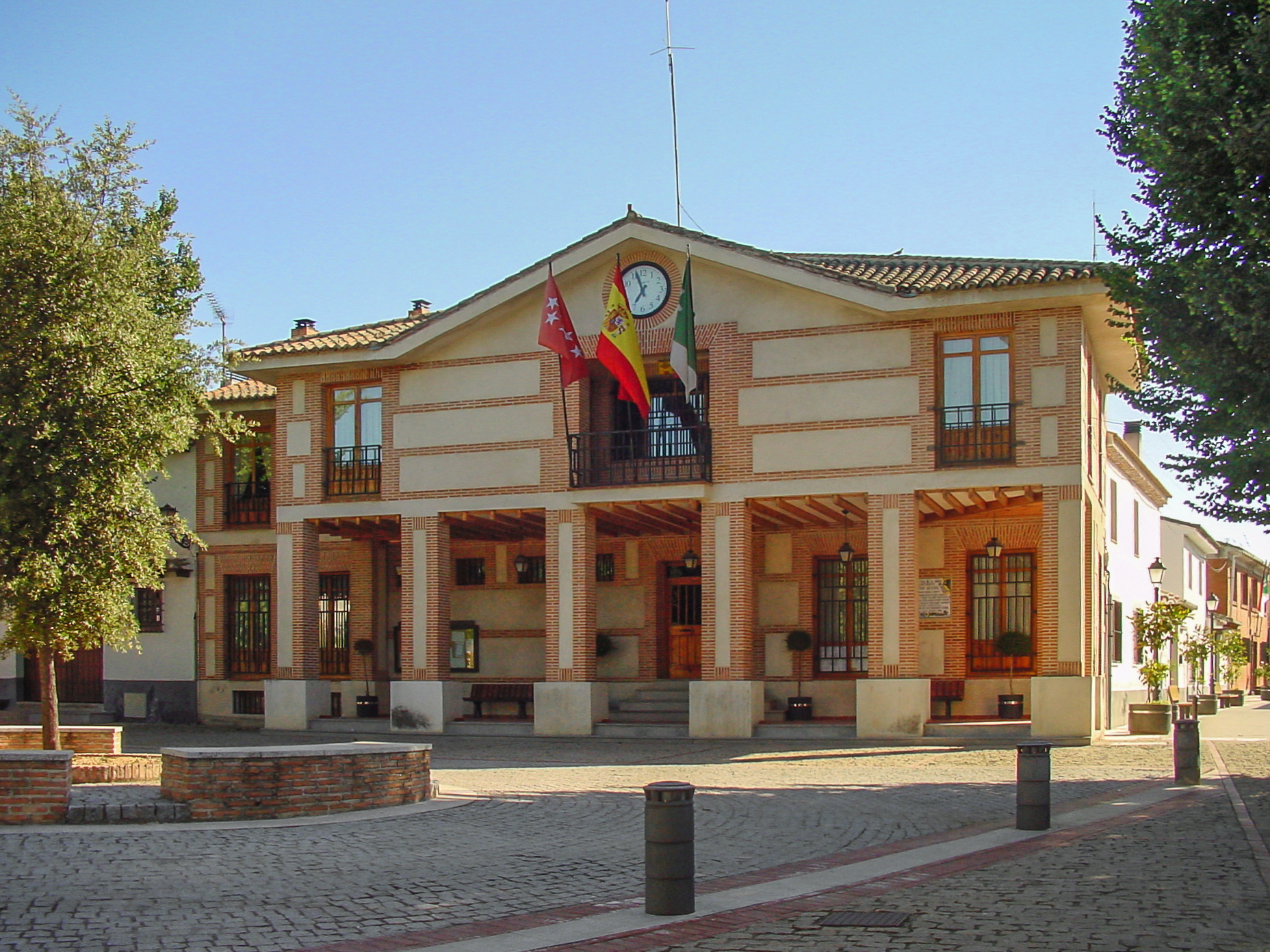
- Cubas de la Sagra Town Hall

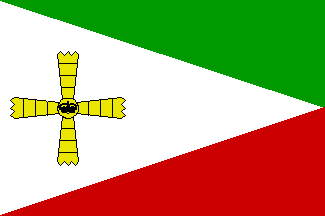
- Flag Coat of arms

- Municipal location within the Community of Madrid.
- Country: Spain
- Autonomous community: Community of Madrid

Area
  - Total: 4.95 sq mi (12.82 km^{2})

Population (2025-01-01)
  - Total: 7,238
- Time zone: UTC+1 (CET)
  - Summer (DST): UTC+2 (CEST)

Cubas de la Sagra (Spanish: [ˈkuβas ðe la ˈsaɣɾa]) is a municipality of the autonomous community of Madrid in central Spain, known for its Marian apparitions. It belongs to the natural comarca of La Sagra. The Church of San Andrés Apóstol stands in the town.
