= Battle of Santa Cruz de Tenerife =

Battle of Santa Cruz de Tenerife may refer to:

- Battle of Santa Cruz de Tenerife (1657), a battle of the Anglo-Spanish War (1654–1660).
- Battle of Santa Cruz de Tenerife (1706), a battle of the War of the Spanish Succession.
- Battle of Santa Cruz de Tenerife (1797), an amphibious assault in the French Revolutionary Wars.
