= Iglesia de San Andrés (Tenerife) =

Coordinates: 28°30′11″N 16°11′21″W

Church of St. Andrew the Apostle
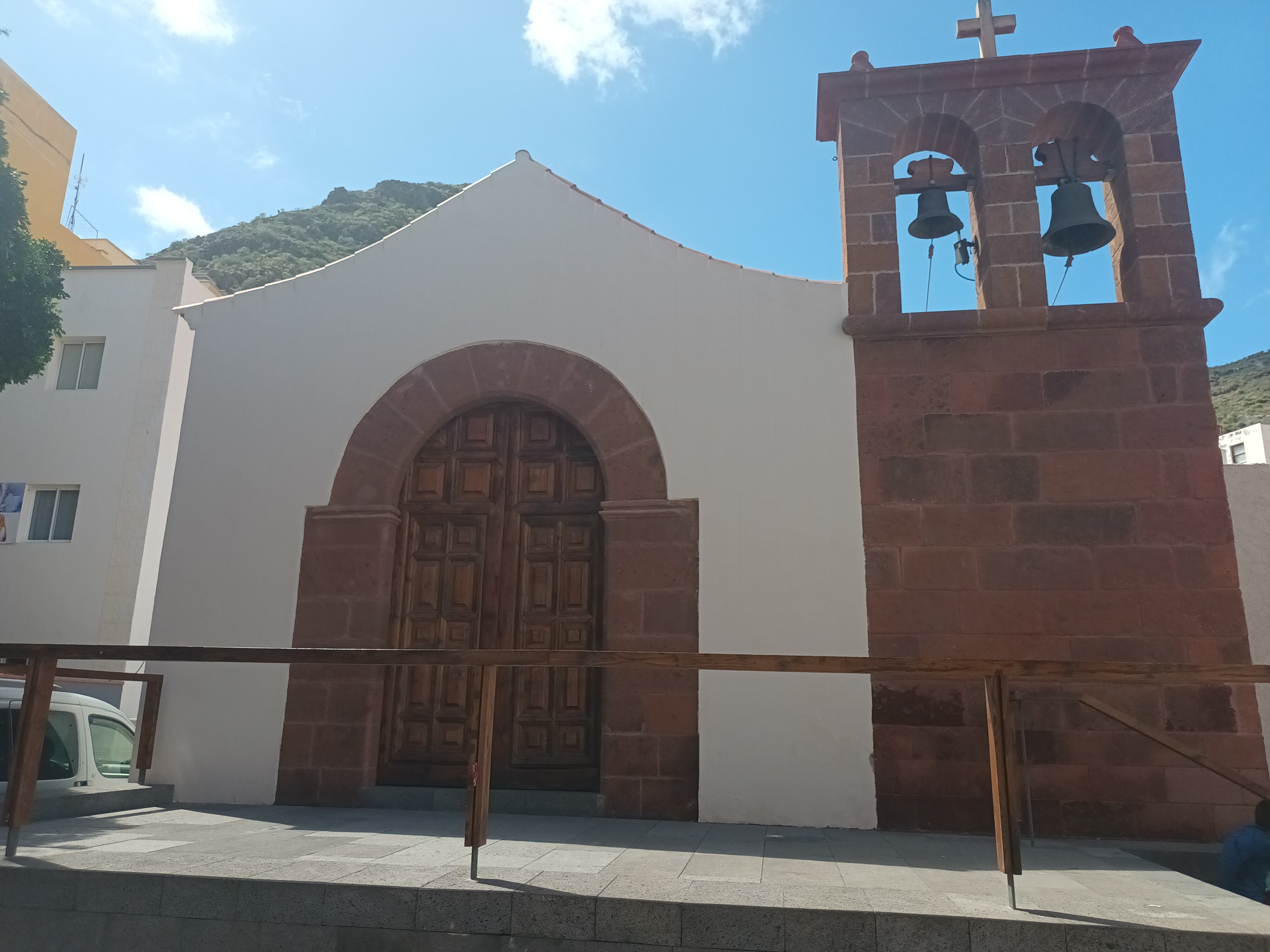
- Iglesia de San Andrés

Religion
- Affiliation: Roman Catholic
- Diocese: Diocese of San Cristóbal de La Laguna
- Province: Archdiocese of Seville
- Ecclesiastical or organisational status: parish church

Location
- Location: San Andrés, Santa Cruz de Tenerife, Spain.
- Interactive map of Church of St. Andrew the Apostle

Architecture
- Type: Church
- Style: Colonial of the Canary Islands
- Groundbreaking: 1510
- Completed: 1680
- Direction of façade: East

The Iglesia de San Andrés Apóstol (Church of St. Andrew the Apostle) is a Catholic church and parish of the village of San Andrés (Santa Cruz de Tenerife, Canary Islands, Spain).

== History ==
Between 1505-1510, Don Lope de Salazar built a chapel, where the present church is located, and placed in it two images: St. Andrew the Apostle and Saint Lucy. The church was dedicated to St. Andrew the Apostle. It is known that in 1520 the chapel was named "Nuestra Señora de Salazar". This primitive hermitage was one of the oldest Christian temples on the island of Tenerife, built shortly after the conquest of the island. It is also known that in 1619 there was a baptism in the church.

The modern St. Andrew's Church was built on a structure of an earlier period. Found in the church an ancient wooden sculpture depicting St. Andrew the Apostle, whose feast is celebrated on November 30 and is the patron saint of the locality. Also noteworthy is the statue of crucified Christ, made of orange wood in 1882 by a local sculptor who suffered from blindness. This carving, known as Santo Cristo del Cegato, is located on one side of the main altar of the temple. The church has many other religious images. Another feature of the church is the altar for the souls in purgatory.

In the tower are two old bells, one of them (the smallest) is said to have belonged to the fleet of Horatio Nelson that tried unsuccessfully to invade the island on July 25, 1797.

== Gallery ==
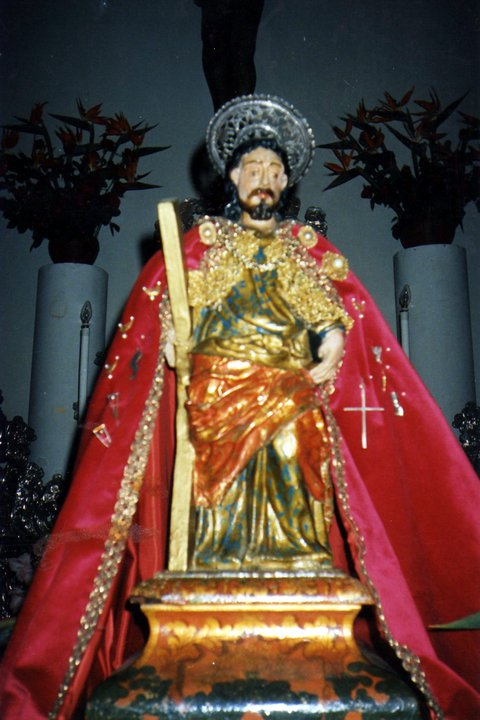
Statuette of St. Andrew the Apostle in the church.

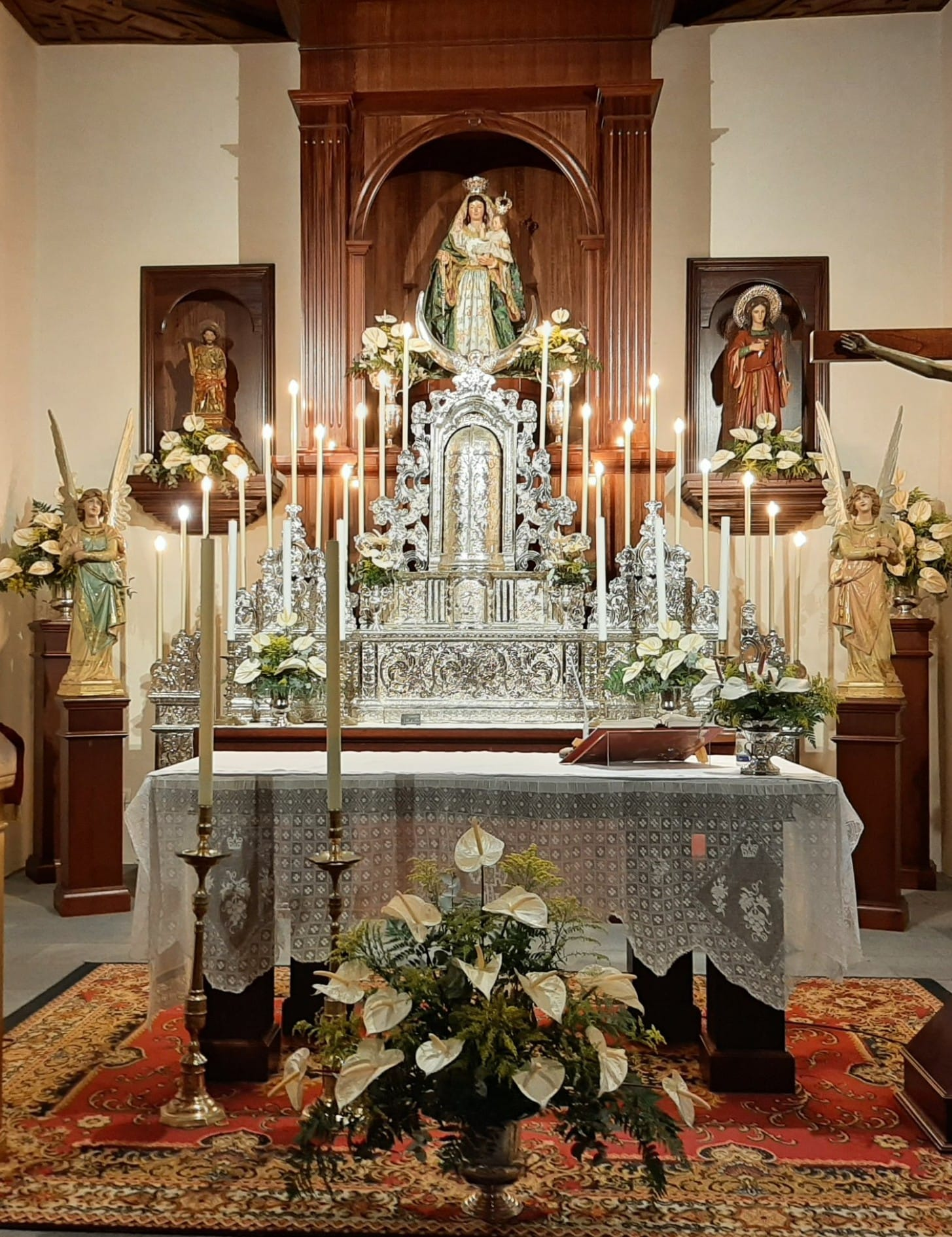
Main altar.

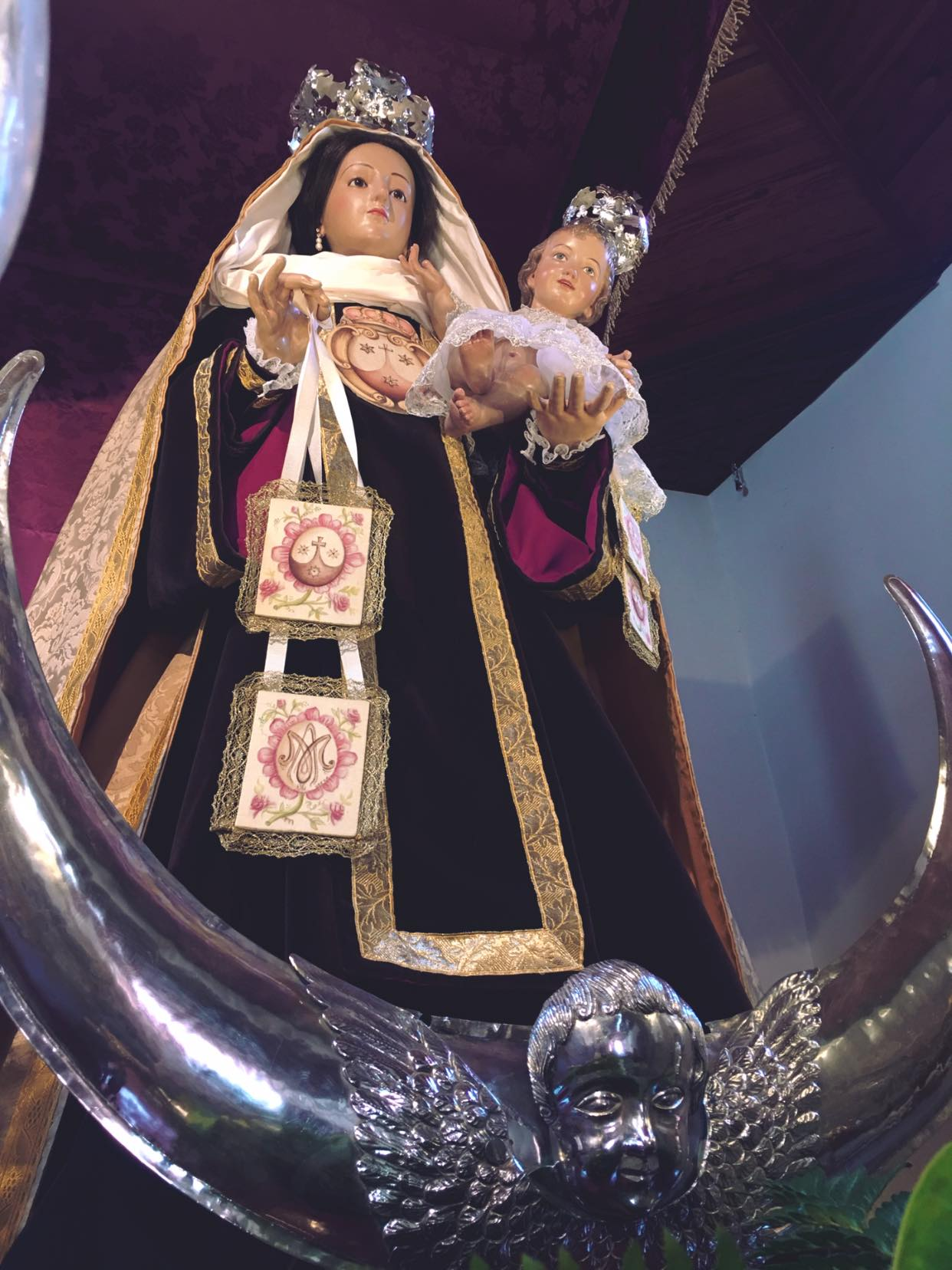
Our Lady of Mount Carmel.

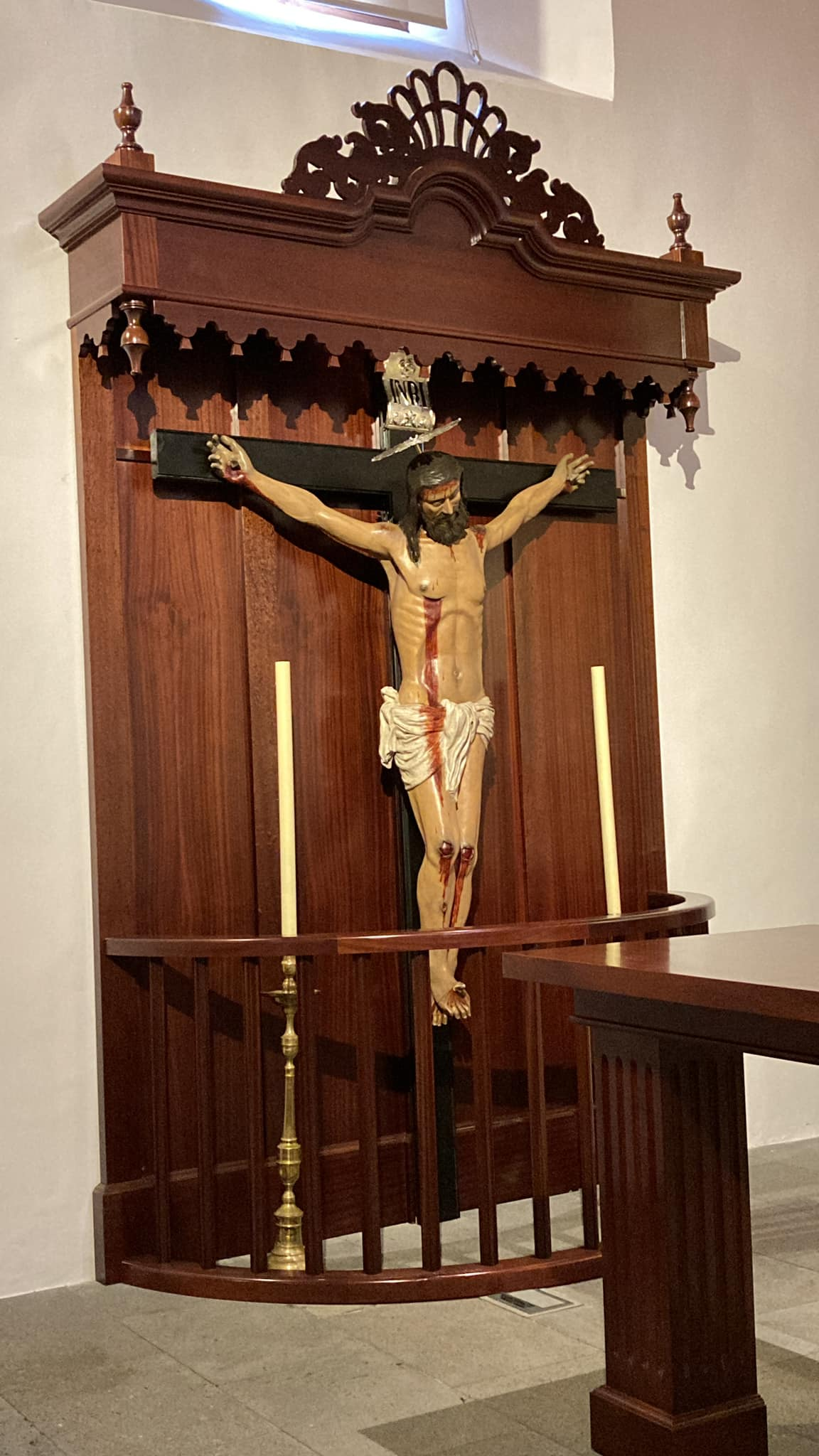
Santo Cristo del Cegato.

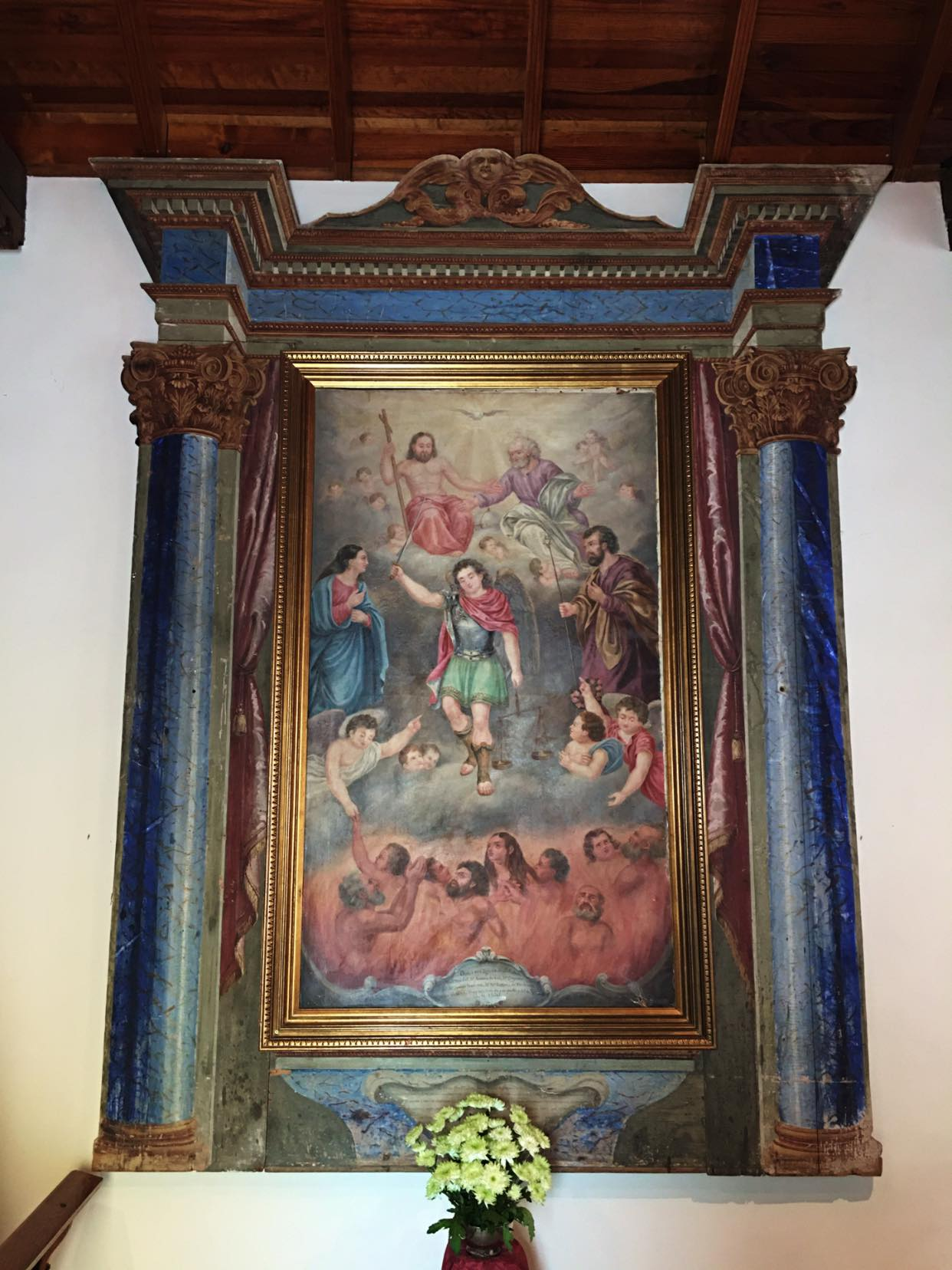
Altar of the Souls of Purgatory.
