= Church of San Andrés Apóstol =

Cultural property in Cubas de la Sagra, Spain

- Iglesia Parroquial de San Andrés Apóstol (Spanish)
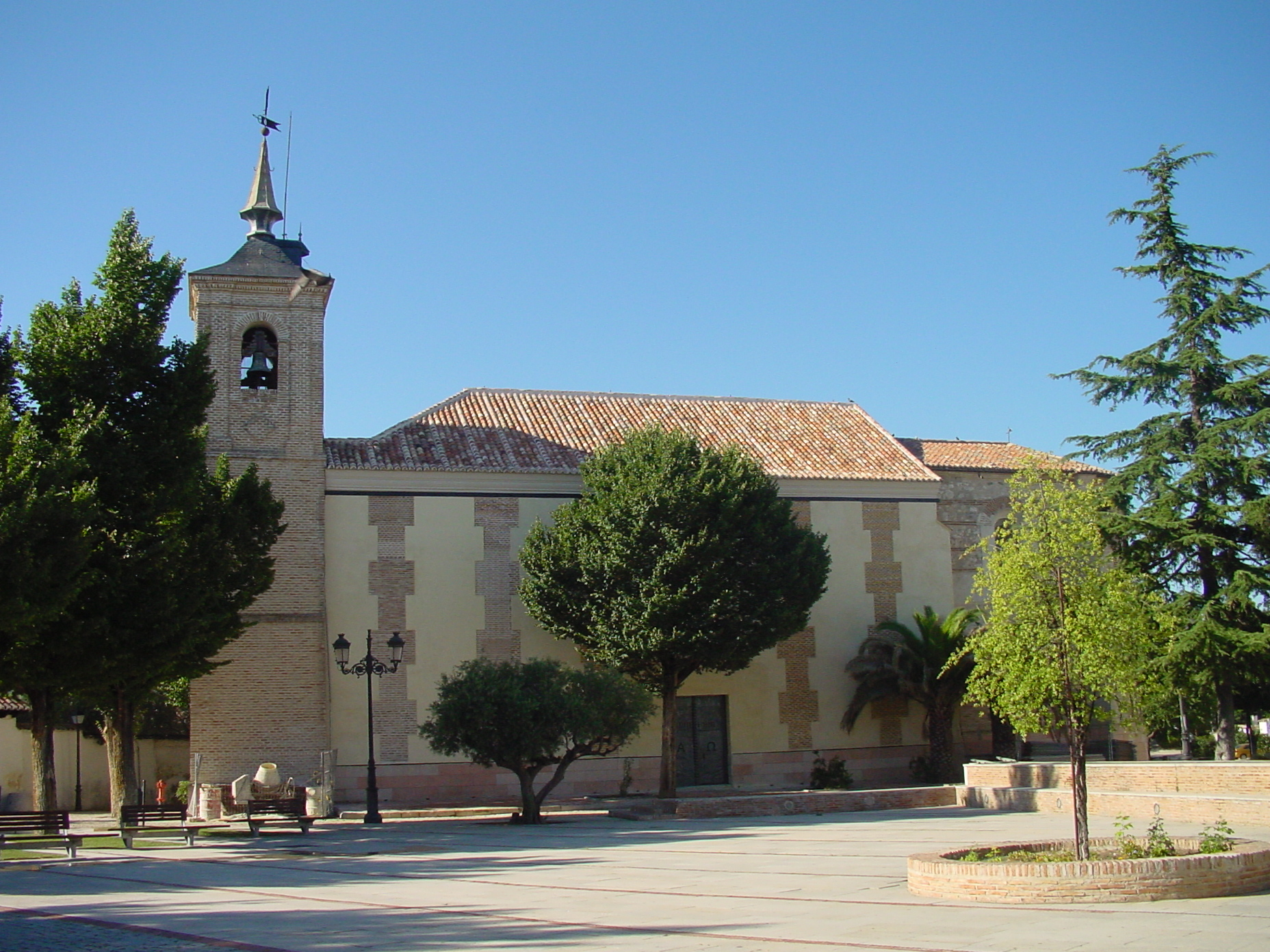

- Location within Spain
- 40.191578°N 3.838046°W
- Location: Cubas de la Sagra, Spain

Spanish Cultural Heritage
- Official name: Iglesia Parroquial de San Andrés Apóstol
- Type: Non-movable
- Criteria: Monument
- Designated: 1983
- Reference no.: RI-51-0004785

The Church of San Andrés Apóstol (Spanish: Iglesia Parroquial de San Andrés Apóstol) is a church located in Cubas de la Sagra, Spain. It was declared Bien de Interés Cultural in 1983.
