= Playa de Las Teresitas =

Beach of San Andrés, Tenerife

- Beach
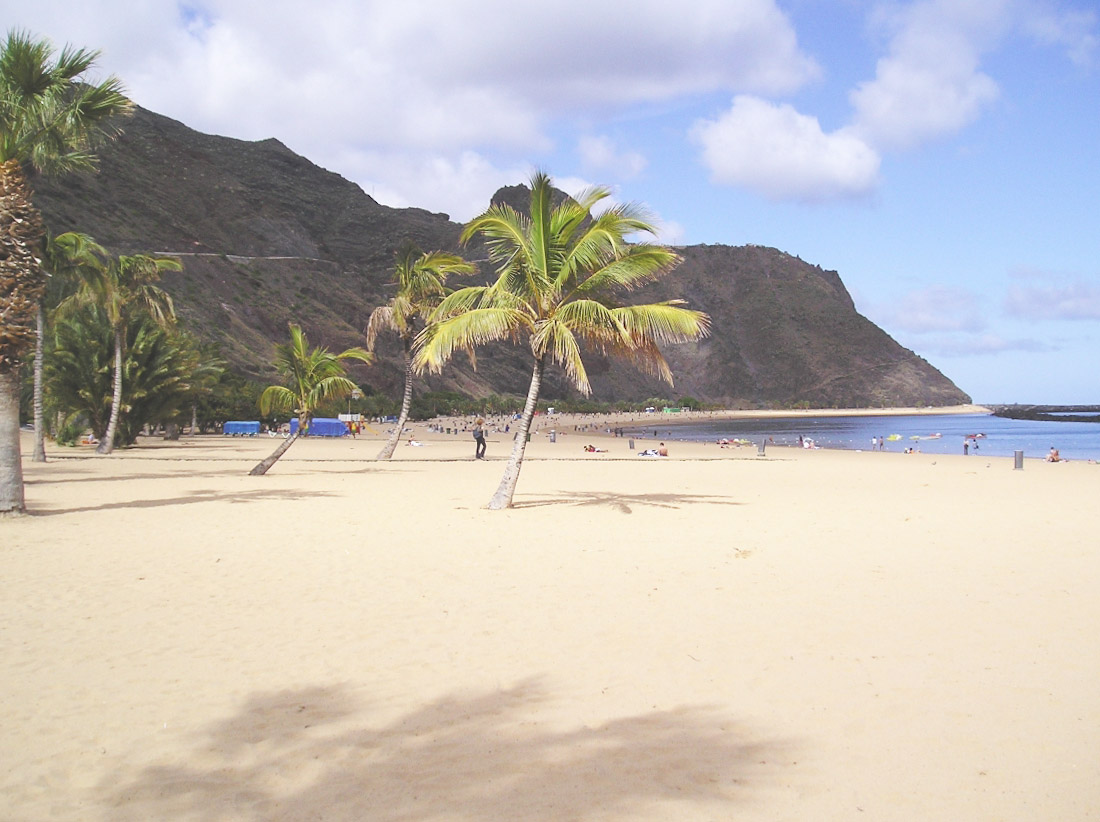
- beach of San Andrés, Tenerife

- Coordinates: 28°30′31″N 16°11′09″W
- Location: Santa Cruz de Tenerife

Dimensions
  - Length: 1,300 metres (4,300 ft)
  - Width: 80 metres (260 ft)

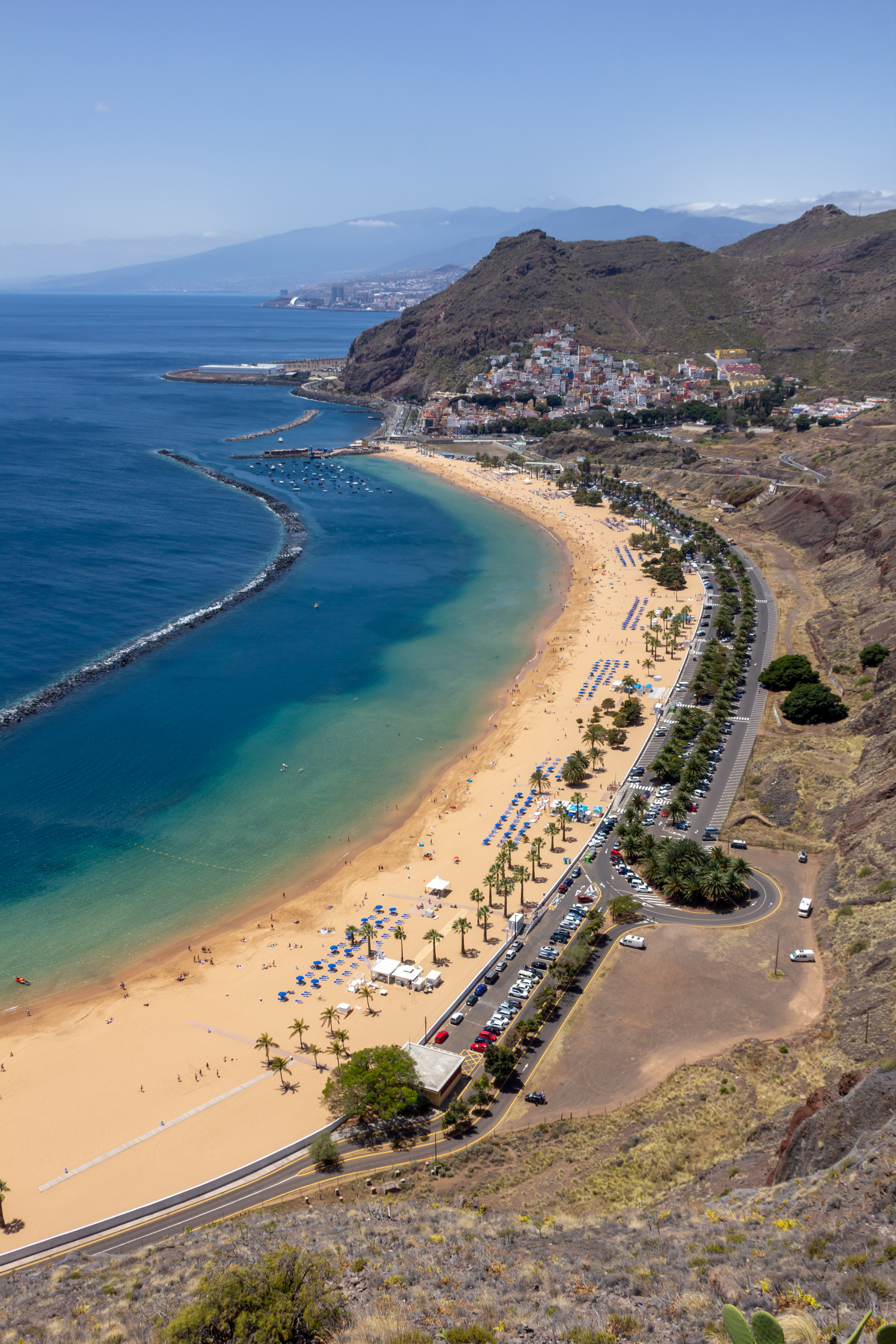
Playa de Las Teresitas from Mirador Las Teresitas in 2019

The Playa de Las Teresitas is an artificial, white sand, tourist beach located north of the village of San Andrés, Santa Cruz de Tenerife in Tenerife, Spain.

== Original beach ==
Originally the area of the beach consisted mostly of stone and rocks, with a small strip of black sand. It was divided into three distinct parts that had different names: Tras la Arena, closest to San Andrés; Los Moros in the middle; and finally the area bounded by the ravine of Las Teresas. There was a private spa in the middle of the beach, and the area was also used for surfing. Above the beach were farms and orchards, growing bananas, mangoes, tomatoes and avocados, that provided the town with most of its income at the time.

There is an important paleontological site of the Quaternary. It is a submarine reservoir in a submerged beach, approximately 400 square meters. It contains fossil mollusks, some endemic.

== Construction of the new beach ==
In the 1950s, various beaches in the Santa Cruz area were disappearing as their sand was being used for construction, and the Port of Santa Cruz de Tenerife expanded in their place. In 1953, constructing an artificial beach at San Andrés was considered by the Ayuntamiento de Santa Cruz de Tenerife (Santa Cruz City Council). The initial plan was approved in 1961, and engineers Pompeyo Alonso and Miguel Pintor created a full design for the new beach. It was approved by the city council in 1965, and the Spanish ministry in 1967.

The expansion of the beach to a width of 80 metres (260 ft) required the compulsory purchase of the farms above the beach, as well as reducing the height of parts of the area, including the removal of part of the ravine.

In 1968, the breakwater was constructed, 150 metres (490 ft) from the shore, with a length of 1 kilometre (0.62 mi). Two piers, and an underwater cutting step, were also constructed, in order to prevent waves from carrying sand out to sea, and make the beach safer for bathers.

The beach is around 1.3 kilometres (0.81 mi) long. At the time, buying black local sand was too expensive due to its scarcity, so importing white Sahara Desert sand from the Western Sahara (then the Spanish Sahara) was investigated. The white sand was also more appealing for tourists. In 1971, the city council obtained a loan of 50 million pesetas, and purchased 150,000 cubic metres of sand, weighing around 270,000 tons, from the El Aaiún region. It was transported by the company Fosfatos de Bucraa, and 5 million bags of sand arrived in the ship Gopegui. It was used to fill the beach in the first half of 1973 to create the artificial beach of white sand, which opened on 15 June 1973, although with initial problems due to red ants and scorpions that were imported along with the sand.

The current set of kiosks were constructed at the same time.

== Maintenance ==
The white sand is lighter than the native black sand. This makes it easier for the wind to pick up the grains and blow them off the beach. The changes to the ravine increased the local windspeed, making the issue worse. The breakwater reduced the waves, which reduced the removal of sand by the waves, but also its replacement by waves. Not much sand is removed by rainfall, as there isn't much in the region, but human impact is significant. The beach is regularly cleaned and smoothed.

Between April and November 1998, another 2,800 tonnes of Saharan sand was added to replenish that lost in the beach's 25 first years of existence. The new sand cost 400 million pesetas.

== Use ==
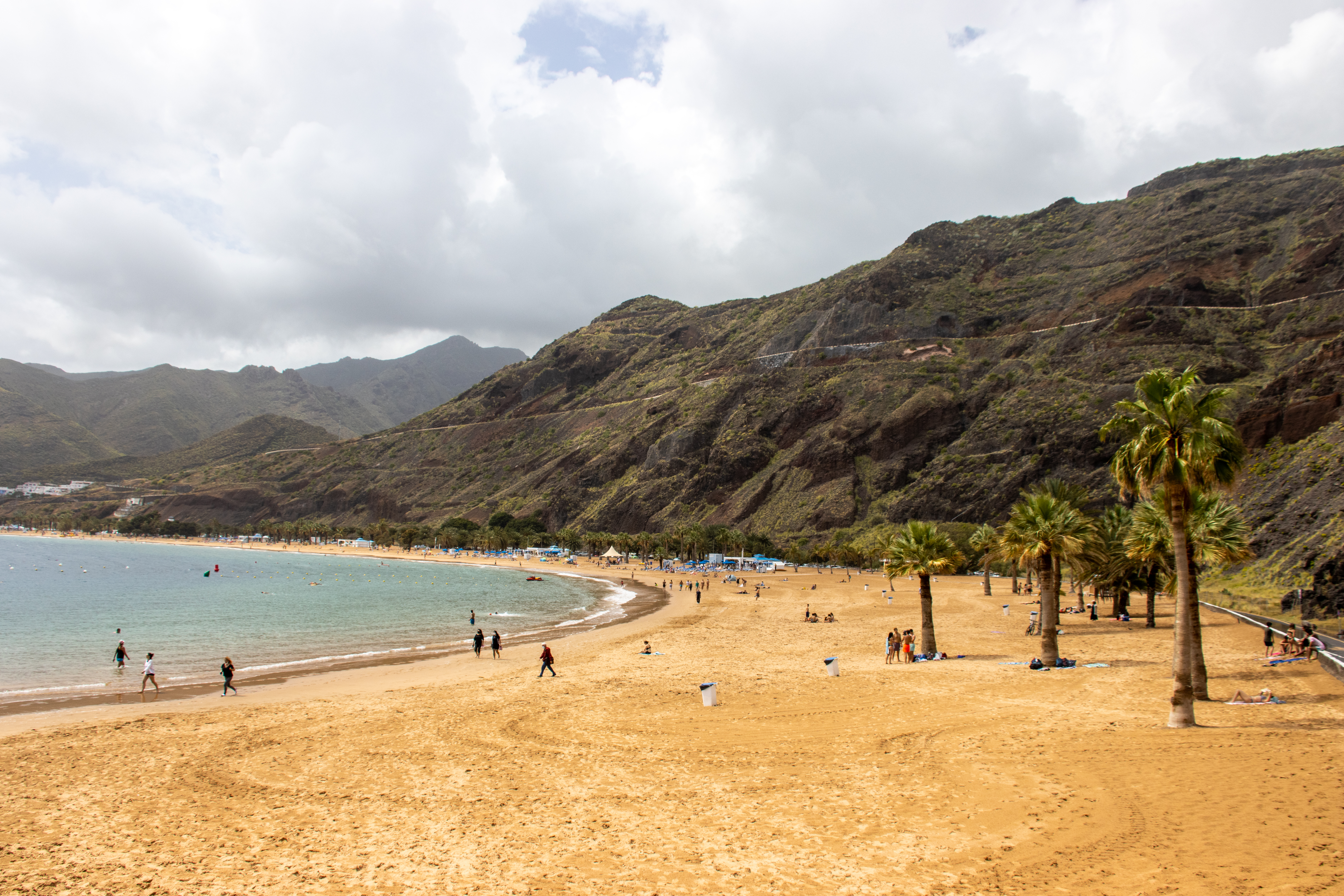
The beach in 2021

It is one of the most popular beaches of the Canary Islands, and is one of the few on Tenerife that do not have the black, volcanic sand that most of the rest of the Canary Islands have. Others such as Las Vistas, in Los Cristianos, are artificial, but the beach at El Médano (the Dune) is entirely natural.

The Playa de Las Teresitas was chosen for the promotional spot for the third season of the reality show, Geordie Shore, "Chaos in Cancún" (aired on MTV in the UK).

The beach has parking for over 100 cars, as well as a bus service. It has a paddle area; bars; restaurants; and facilities.
