= Church of San Andrés, Elciego =

Church in Elciego, Spain

Church of San Andrés
- Iglesia de San Andrés (Spanish); San Andres eliza (Basque)
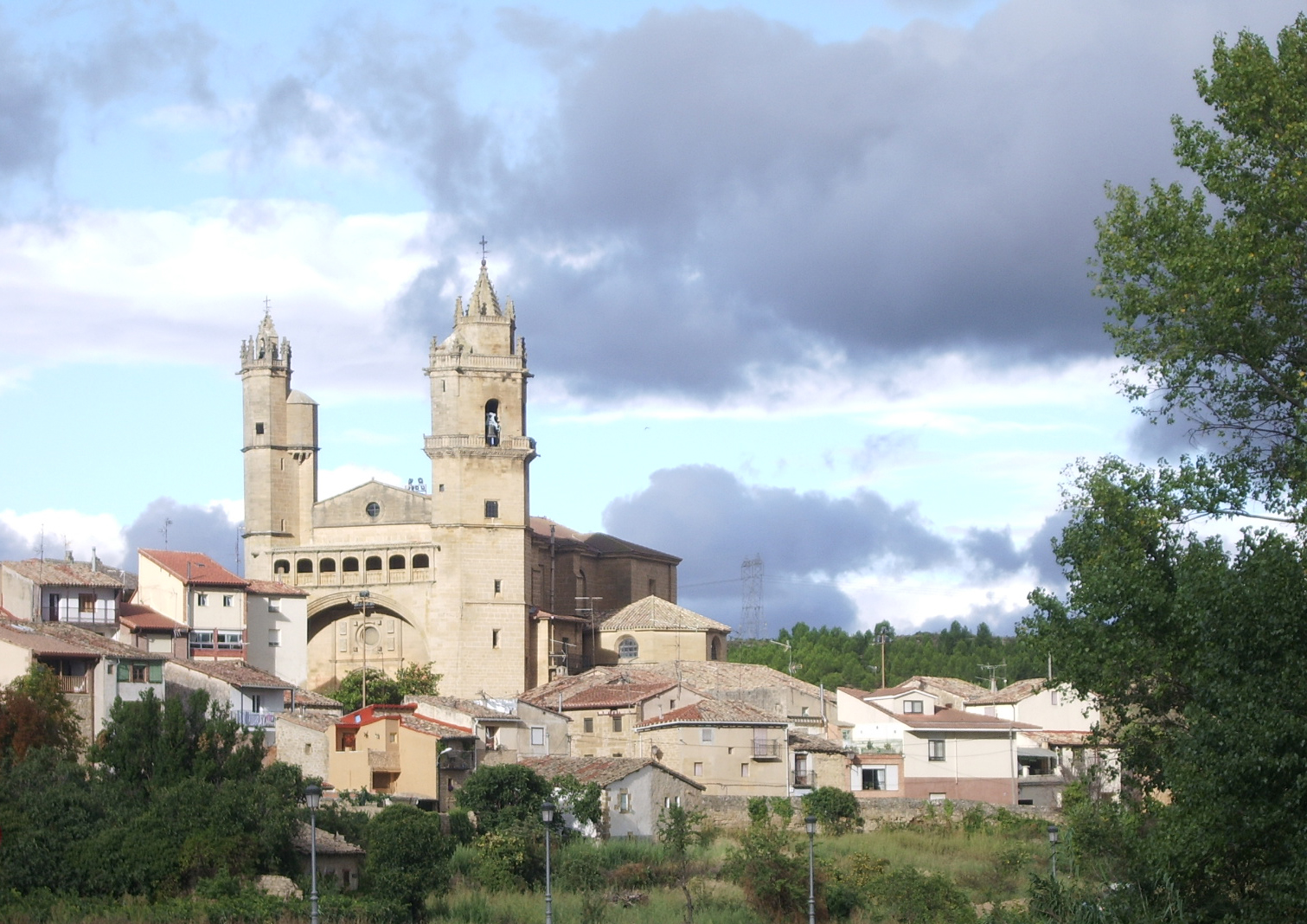
- View of the church
- 42°30′51″N 2°37′01″W
- Location: Elciego, Álava, Basque Country
- Country: Spain
- Denomination: Catholic Church
- Tradition: Latin Church

History
- Status: Parish church

Administration
- Archdiocese: Archidiocese of Burgos
- Diocese: Diocese of Vitoria

Spanish Cultural Heritage
- Official name: Iglesia de San Andrés
- Type: Non-movable
- Criteria: Monument
- Designated: 1984
- Reference no.: RI-51-0005104

The Church of San Andrés (Spanish: Iglesia de San Andrés, Basque: San Andres eliza) is a church located in Elciego, Basque Country, Spain. It was declared Bien de Interés Cultural in 1984.
